= Pierra Menta =

Ski mountaineering competition

The Pierra Menta has been an annual competition of ski mountaineering at Arêches-Beaufort in the region of Beaufort, Savoie south-eastern France since 1986. The Pierra Menta is one of the three best known races of the Alps (les grandes trois de ski de montagne) besides the Patrouille des Glaciers and the Trofeo Mezzalama.

Pierra Menta is a stage of La Grande Course that includes the most important ski mountaineering competitions of the season.

The athletes have to travel a cumulative altitude difference of around 10 000 meters, both ascending and skiing down. The race track is to be completed in teams of two and it varies year by year. The distance for the younger classes is shorter.

== Top Ten lists ==
=== 1st Pierra Menta (1986) ===
Men: ranking / participants; / (France) Pascal Fagnola / (France) Jean-Marc Joguet; / (France) Yvan Hernandez / (France) Jean-Yves Igonenc; / (France) Michel Fatras / (France) Lucas Meignan; 4 / (France) Guy Challeat / (France) Thierry Carco; 5 / (France) Eric Gachet / (France) Yves Cornu; 6 / (France) Daniel Mestrallet / (France) Gilbert Villien; 7 / (France) Jacques Bon Mardion / (France) Claude Perrier; 8 / (France) Raymond Ulliel / (France) Jacques Cordola; 9 / (France) Pierre Louison / (France) Alain Moustache; 10 / (France) Denis Bochet Drivet / (France) Tarin L. Mathel
=== 2nd Pierra Menta (1987) ===
Men: ranking / participants; / (France) Étienne Arthurion / (France) Didier Clavier; / (France) Denis Pivot / (France) Philippe Foulon; / (France) Michel Fatras / Jean-Jacques Bouchage; 4 / Jean-Marc Joguet / Thierry Bochet; 5 / Jean-Pierre Farys / Patrick Denche; 6 / Gilbert Villien / Yves Olbrecht; 7 / René Champange / Yves Gay Perret; 8 / Pierre Jouty / Noël Regnier; 9 / Joël Lunardi / Daniel Ducoin; 10 / Henri Marchand / Guillaume Prin
=== 3rd Pierra Menta (1988) ===
Men: ranking / participants; / Ján Filipský / Milan Filipský; / Pierre d'Alboy / André Favre; / Pascal Fagnola / Dominique Gleizes; 4 / Didier Clavier / Christian Roussel; 5 / Pierre Viard Gaudin / Jean-Marc Joguet; 6 / Daniel Fougeray / Jean-Luc Pardi; 7 / Yvon Blanc / Thierry Bochet; 8 / Yves Olbrecht / Gilbert Villien; 9 / Noël Regnier / Pierre Jouty; 10 / Marius Favre / Jacques Violon	Women: ranking / participants; / Claudine Trécourt / Sylvie Trécourt; / Françoise Gendarme / Christine Morfin
=== 4th Pierra Menta (1989) ===
Men: ranking / participants; / Adriano Greco / Fabio Meraldi; / Ján Filipský / Milan Filipský; / Robert Galfy / Peter Lichý; 4 / Olivier Besson / Laurent Lukie; 5 / Dominique Gleizes / Philippe Renard; 6 / Pierre d'Alboy / Patrick Gabarrou; 7 / Thierry Bochet / Jean-Jacques Bouchage; 8 / Hervé Frison / Gilles Gobbo; 9 / Gilbert Villien / Yves Olbrecht; 10 / Marius Favre / Jacques Violon	Women: ranking / participants; / Sylvie Trécourt / Claudine Trécourt; / Christine Janin / Martine Rolland
=== 5th Pierra Menta (1990) ===
Men: ranking / participants; / Adriano Greco / Fabio Meraldi; / Daniel Lanne / Gilles Trousselier; / Walter Schimpfossl / Andreas Steger; 4 / Marius Favre / Ruche Bibollet; 5 / Lionel Mailly / Philippe Renard; 6 / Pierre d'Alboy / Vincent Sprungli; 7 / Pierre Satge / Christian Sabathe; 8 / René Roulet / Bernard Moge; 9 / Enrico Lazzeri / Matteo Lazzeri; 10 / Jean-Marc Culotta / Daniel Fougeray	Women: ranking / participants; / Sylvie Trécourt / Claudine Trécourt; / Annie Pivot / Marie-Christine Subot; / Christine Janin / Catherine Destivelle
=== 6th Pierra Menta (1991) ===
Men: ranking / participants; / Adriano Greco / Fabio Meraldi; / Thierry Bochet / Francis Bibollet; / Daniel Lanne / Gilles Trousselier; 4 / Lionel Mailly / Patrick Gabarrou; 5 / Maurizio del Antonio / Luca Leonardi; 6 / Pierre-Alain Morand / Ludovic Chanut; 7 / René Roulet / Ludovic Knoertzer; 8 / Paul Mollière / Guillaume Prin; 9 / Olivier Besson / Laurent Lukie; 10 / Daniel Fougeray / Jean-Marc Culotta	Women: ranking / participants; / Sylvie Trécourt / Claudine Trécourt; / Martine Rolland / Odile Ladret
=== 7th Pierra Menta (1992) ===
Men: ranking / participants; / Francis Bibollet / Thierry Bochet; / Adriano Greco / Fabio Meraldi; / Yvan Brondex / Christophe Jond; 4 / Raphy Frossard / Paul Joguet; 5 / Paul Mollière / Guillaume Prin; 6 / Rasťo Frank / C. (Dušan???) Trizna; 7 / Omar Oprandi / Marco Polla; 8 / Jean-Marc Culotta / Jean-Luc Pardi; 9 / Tibor Novajovský / Miroslav Leitner; 10 / Michel Frison-Roche / Bernard Frison-Roche	Women and mixed: ranking / participants; / Bruna Fanetti / Carlo Clerico; / Sylvie Trécourt / Claudine Trécourt; / Olivier Pasteur / Sylvie Pasteur; 4 / Rémy Bozonnet / Chantal Bozonnet; 5 / Martine Rolland / Jean-Jacques Rolland; 6 / Pierre Buttin / Danielle Hacquard; 7 / Claudia Weber / Edith Wachter
=== 8th Pierra Menta (1993) ===
Men: ranking / participants; / Adriano Greco / Fabio Meraldi; / Francis Bibollet / Thierry Bochet; / Miroslav Leitner / Dušan Trizna; 4 / Omar Oprandi / Marco Polla; 5 / Christophe Jond / Marc Arvin-Berod; 6 / Guillaume Prin / Paul Mollière; 7 / Gilles Barnéoud / Eric Thole; 8 / Marco Clerici / Michelangelo Oprandi; 9 / Pierre-Alain Morand / Christophe Profit; 10 / Patrick Lambert / Lionel Bonnel
=== 9th Pierra Menta (1994) ===
Men: ranking / participants; / Adriano Greco / Fabio Meraldi; / Dušan Trizna / Milan Madaj; / Adriano Salvadori / Pietro Gozza; 4 / Sébastien Figliolini / Pierre Blanc; 5 / Thierry Bochet / Thomas Ilg; 6 / Patrick Lambert / Lionel Bonnet; 7 / Carlo Clercici / Michelangelo Oprandi; 8 / Guillaume Prin / Paul Mollière; 9 / Bruno Bottollier / Yves Trappier; 10 / Miroslav Leitner / Jean-Bastipte Mang	Women: ranking / participants; / Sylvie Trécourt / Claudine Trécourt; / Danielle Hacquard / Isabel Rogé Tartarini
=== 10th Pierra Menta (1995) ===
Men: ranking / participants; / Fabio Meraldi / Thierry Bochet; / Dušan Trizna / Milan Madaj; / Pierre Blanc / Sébastien Figliolini; 4 / Christophe Jond / Yvan Brondex; 5 / Pierre Gignoux / Olivier Pasteur; 6 / Jean-Michel Bouvier / Paul Joguet; 7 / Omar Oprandi / Marco Polla; 8 / Ekkehard Dörschlag / Martin Hornegger; 9 / Graziano Boscacci / Ivan Murada; 10 / René Gachet / Jean-Marc Joguet	Women: ranking / participants; / Tatiana Moskova / Jana Heczková; / Claudine Trécourt / Alexia Zuberer; / Danielle Hacquard / Isabel Rogé Tartarini; 4 / Lydia Fritz / Irene Radler; 5 / Marie-Paule Nullans / Josette Laborde
=== 11th Pierra Menta (1996) ===
Men: ranking / participants; / Fabio Meraldi / Enrico Pedrini; / Sébastien Figliolini / Pierre Blanc; / Dušan Trizna / Milan Madaj; 4 / Francis Bibollet / Pierre Gignoux; 5 / Miroslav Leitner / Peter Matos; 6 / Cheto Blavaschi / Camillo Vescovo; 7 / Christophe Jond / Yvan Brondex; 8 / Olivier Pasteur / Hubert Fievet; 9 / Paul Joguet / Thomas Ilg; 10 / René Gachet / Jean-Marc Joguet	Women: ranking / participants; / Tatiana Moskova / Jana Heczková; / Danielle Hacquard / Isabel Rogé Tartarini
=== 12th Pierra Menta (1997) ===
Men: ranking / participants; / Fabio Meraldi / Enrico Pedrini; / Yvan Brondex / Pierre Gignoux; / Adriano Salvador / Thierry Bochet; 4 / René Gachet / Paul Joguet; 5 / Vincent Meilleur / Jean-Michel Bouvier; 6 / Christophe Jond / Olivier Callamard; 7 / Pep Ollé / Gildo Vuillen; 8 / Lionel Bonnel / Patrick Lambert; 9 / Miroslav Leitner / Peter Matos; 10 / Patrice Bret / Stéphane Brosse	Women: ranking / participants; / Claudine Trécourt / Alexia Zuberer; / Danielle Hacquard / Véronique Lathuraz; / Jana Heczková / Isabel Rogé Tartarini; 4 / Corinne Favre / Nathalie Bourillon
=== 13th Pierra Menta (1998) ===
Men: ranking / participants; / Pierre Blanc / Sébastien Figliolini; / Pierre Gignoux / Yvan Brondex; / Fabio Meraldi / Enrico Pedrini; 4 / Adriano Salvadori / Omar Oprandi; 5 / Jérôme Arpin / Vincent Meilleur; 6 / Graziano Boscacci / Ivan Murada; 7 / Patrice Bret / Stéphane Brosse; 8 / Dušan Trizna / Milan Madaj; 9 / Adriano Greco / Miroslav Leitner; 10 / Lionel Bonnel / Michel Sibuet Becquet	Women: ranking / participants; / Claudine Trécourt / Alexia Zuberer; / Danielle Hacquard / Véronique Lathuraz; / Corinne Favre / Jana Heczková; 4 / Corinne Roux-Mollard / Gloriana Pellissier; 5 / Anna Augusti / Christine Pessonnier
=== 14th Pierra Menta (1999) ===
Men: ranking / participants; / Fabio Meraldi / Enrico Pedrini; / Pierre Gignoux / Francis Bibollet; / Patrice Bret / Stéphane Brosse; 4 / Ivan Murada / Graziano Boscacci; 5 / Pius Schuwey / Heinz Blatter; 6 / Jérôme Arpin / Vincent Meilleur; 7 / Jean-Yves Rey / Jean-Daniel Masserey; 8 / René Gachet / Paul Joguet; 9 / Tony Sbalbi / Laurent Fabre; 10 / Cyril Champange / Bertrand Blanc	Women: ranking / participants; / Claudine Trécourt / Danielle Hacquard; / Corinne Favre / Gloriana Pellissier; / Véronique Lathuraz / Alexia Zuberer; 4 / Catherine Mabillard / Véronique Ançay; 5 / Valérie Ducognon / Delphine Oggeri; 6 / Marie-Paule Nullans / Laurence Picolo; 7 / Eva Rimnas / Pia Johansson
=== 15th Pierra Menta (2000) ===
Men: ranking / participants; / Fabio Meraldi / Enrico Pedrini; / Francis Bibollet / Pierre Gignoux; / Patrice Bret / Stéphane Brosse; 4 / Miroslav Leitner / Peter Svätojánsky; 5 / Graziano Boscacci / Ivan Murada; 6 / Dušan Trizna / Milan Madaj; 7 / Vincent Meilleur / Jean Pellissier; 8 / Patrick Rassat / René Gachet; 9 / Bertrand Blanc / Cyril Champange; 10 / Adriano Greco / Miki Oprandi	Women: ranking / participants; / Alexia Zuberer / Gloriana Pellissier; / Valérie Ducognon / Delphine Oggeri; / Nathalie Blanc / Nathalie Bourillon; 4 / Carole Toïgo / Laurence Darragon; 5 / Véronique Lathuraz / Sigrid Tomio; 6 / Anne-Laure Boniface / Corinne Martin; 7 / Carole Vidor / Valérie Conan
=== 16th Pierra Menta (2001) ===
Men: ranking / participants; / Stéphane Brosse / Pierre Gignoux; / Ivan Murada / Graziano Boscacci; / Vincent Meilleur / Cédric Tomio; 4 / Miroslav Leitner / Peter Svätojánsky; 5 / Carlo Battel / Omar Oprandi; 6 / Bertrand Blanc / Cyril Champange; 7 / Jean-François Cuennet / Pierre-Marie Taramarcaz; 8 / Emmanuel Blanc / Grégory Gachet; 9 / Milan Madaj / Dušan Trizna; 10 / Alexander Hug / Olivier Nägele	Women: ranking / participants; / Alexia Zuberer / Gloriana Pellissier; / Valérie Ducognon / Delphine Oggeri; / Véronique Ançay / Nicole Gillioz; 4 / Catherine Guigon / Sigrid Tomio; 5 / Séverine Champange / Muriel Vaudey; 6 / Véronique Lathuraz / Anne-Laure Boniface; 7 / Laurence Darragon / Carole Toïgo; 8 / Marie-Paule Nullans / Cécile Eichinger
=== 17th Pierra Menta (2002) ===
Men: ranking / participants; / Ivan Murada / Graziano Boscacci; / Stéphane Brosse / Pierre Gignoux; / Luciano Fontana / Luca Negroni; 4 / Vincent Meilleur / Cédric Tomio; 5 / Bertrand Blanc / Cyril Champange; 6 / Tony Sbalbi / Patrick Blanc; 7 / Jean Pellissier / Olivier Nägele; 8 / Miroslav Leitner / Peter Svätojánsky; 9 / Laurent Fabre / Olivier Pasteur; 10 / Eugen Innerkofler / Ivano Molin	Women: ranking / participants; / Valérie Ducognon / Delphine Oggeri; / Corinne Favre / Carole Toïgo; / Nathalie Bourillon / Véronique Lathuraz; 4 / Séverine Champange / Muriel Vaudey; 5 / Emma Roca Rodríguez / Cristina Bes Ginesta; 6 / Sandrine Guet / Laetitia Gachet; 7 / Elena Pedone / Maria Rosa Morotti; 8 / Laure Bonnet / Laurence Darragon
=== 18th Pierra Menta (2003) ===
Men: ranking / participants; / Patrick Blanc / Tony Sbalbi; / Stéphane Brosse / Pierre Gignoux; / Vincent Meilleur / Cédric Tomio; 4 / Bertrand Blanc / Cyril Champange; 5 / Ivan Murada / Graziano Boscacci; 6 / Damien Farquet / Rico Elmer; 7 / Emmanuel Blanc / Grégory Gachet; 8 / Laurent Fabre / Gabriel Degabai; 9 / Patrick Rassat / René Gachet; 10 / Alexandre Borot / Paul Blanc	Women: ranking / participants; / Valérie Ducognon / Delphine Oggeri; / Anne Bochatay / Catherine Mabillard; / Corinne Favre / Carole Toïgo; 4 / Astrid Renzler / Greti Rogger; 5 / Séverine Champange / Muriel Vaudey; 6 / Nathalie Blanc / Catherine Guigon; 7 / Jeanine Bapst / Annick Rey; 8 / Simone Hornegger / Anna Pažitná; 9 / Elena Pedone / Maria Rosa Morotti; 10 / Laetitia Gachet / Sandrine Guet
=== 19th Pierra Menta (2004) ===
Men: ranking / participants; / Manfred Reichegger / Dennis Brunod; / Vincent Meilleur / Cédric Tomio; / Florent Perrier / Grégory Gachet; 4 / Jean Pellissier / Carlo Battel; 5 / Graziano Boscacci / Ivan Murada; 6 / Patrick Blanc / Tony Sbalbi; 7 / Cyril Champange / Bertrand Blanc; 8 / Luciano Fontana / Ivano Molin; 9 / Martial Premat / Jean-François Premat; 10 / Fabien Anselmet / Jean-Marcel Grillet	Women: ranking / participants; / Cristina Favre-Moretti / Catherine Mabillard; / Corinne Favre / Carole Toïgo; / Delphine Oggeri / Muriel Vaudey; 4 / Simone Hornegger / Anna Pažitná; 5 / Valérie Chamson / Corinne Philipp; 6 / Alice Lauga / Anne Petit
=== 20th Pierra Menta (2005) ===
Men: ranking / participants; / Stéphane Brosse / Patrick Blanc; / Florent Perrier / Grégory Gachet; / Guido Giacomelli / Jean Pellissier; 4 / Graziano Boscacci / Ivan Murada; 5 / Vincent Meilleur / Bertrand Blanc; 6 / Pierre-Marie Taramarcaz / Christian Pittex; 7 / Stéphane Chevallier / Martial Premat; 8 / Tony Sbalbi / Cyril Champange; 9 / Miroslav Leitner / Peter Svätojánsky; 10 / Lionel Bonnel / Daniel Degabai	Women: ranking / participants; / Cristina Favre-Moretti / Isabella Crettenand-Moretti; / Valérie Ducognon / Delphine Oggeri; / Carole Toïgo / Corinne Favre; 4 / Emma Roca Rodríguez / Jeannie Wall; 5 / Jeanine Bapst / Andréa Zimmermann; 6 / Nathalie Blanc / Véronique Ançay; 7 / Muriel Vaudey / Laetitia Gachet; 8 / Alexia Zuberer / Sylvie Ferragu; 9 / Anne Petit / Sylvie Turbil; 10 / Alice Lauga / Magali Jacquemoud
=== 21st Pierra Menta (2006) ===
Men: ranking / participants; / Stéphane Brosse / Patrick Blanc; / Guido Giacomelli / Hansjörg Lunger; / Rico Elmer / Florent Troillet; 4 / Tony Sbalbi / Denis Trento; 5 / Vincent Meilleur / Bertrand Blanc; 6 / Cyril Champange / Alexandre Pellicier; 7 / Graziano Boscacci / Ivan Murada; 8 / Yannick Ecoeur / Alain Rey; 9 / Milan Madaj / Peter Svätojánsky; 10 / Martial Premat / Philippe Blanc	Women: ranking / participants; / Francesca Martinelli / Roberta Pedranzini; / Véronique Lathuraz / Nathalie Bourillon; / Catherine Mabillard / Séverine Pont-Combe; 4 / Corinne Favre / Carole Toïgo; 5 / Valentine Fabre / Muriel Vaudey; 6 / Magali Jacquemoud / Blandine Ducrest; 7 / Simone Hornegger / Renate Schwab; 8 / Anna Hidalgo Vilalta / Alicia Vila Torrents; 9 / Chiarra Tallia / Bruna Riperto
=== 22nd Pierra Menta (2007) ===
Men: ranking / participants; / Florent Perrier / Grégory Gachet; / Guido Giacomelli / Hansjörg Lunger; / Alexandre Pellicier / Bertrand Blanc; 4 / Vincent Meilleur / William Bon Mardion; 5 / Tony Sbalbi / Denis Trento; 6 / Alexander Hug / Alain Rey; 7 / Jean Pellissier / Martin Riz; 8 / Ivan Murada / Daniele Pedrini; 9 / Fabien Anselmet / Sébastien Baud; 10 / Jordi Bes Ginesta / Marc Solá Pastoret	Women: ranking / participants; / Francesca Martinelli / Roberta Pedranzini; / Corinne Favre / Nathalie Bourillon; / Véronique Lathuraz / Valentine Fabre; 4 / Christiane Nex / Laura Chiara Besseghini; 5 / Gabrielle Magnenat / Andréa Zimmermann; 6 / Magali Jacquemoud / Catherine Guigon; 7 / Magaly Chavanne / Annabelle Floquet; 8 / Christine Diaque / Annick Rey; 9 / Cécile Eichinger / Carine Porret; 10 / Catherine Mouquet / Anne Bénédicte Favaudon
=== 23rd Pierra Menta (2008) ===
Men: ranking / participants; / Florent Troillet / Kílian Jornet Burgada; / Guido Giacomelli / Hansjörg Lunger; / Patrick Blanc / Peter Svätojánsky; 4 / William Bon Mardion / Grégory Gachet; 5 / Alexandre Pellicier / Ola Berger; 6 / Tony Sbalbi / Ivan Murada; 7 / Yannick Ecoeur / Reynold Ginier; 8 / Ernest Farquet / Marcel Marti; 9 / Philippe Blanc / Didier Blanc; 10 / Daniele Pedrini / Pietro Lanfranchi	Women: ranking / participants; / Laëtitia Roux / Nathalie Etzensperger; / Francesca Martinelli / Roberta Pedranzini; / Gabrielle Magnenat / Séverine Pont-Combe; 4 / Corinne Favre / Véronique Lathuraz; 5 / Valérie Ducognon / Delphine Oggeri; 6 / Cristina Bes Ginesta / Emma Roca Rodríguez; 7 / Judith Graßl / Stefanie Koch; 8 / Laëtitia Currat / Marie Troillet; 9 / Valentine Fabre / Magali Jacquemoud; 10 / Orietta Calliari / Raffaella Rossi
=== 24th Pierra Menta (2009) ===
Men: ranking / participants; / Dennis Brunod / Manfred Reichegger; / Matteo Eydallin / Denis Trento; / Florent Perrier / Yannick Buffet; 4 / Tony Sbalbi / Didier Blanc; 5 / Marcel Marti / Florent Troillet; 6 / Grégory Gachet / Alexandre Pellicier; 7 / Nicolas Bonnet / William Bon Mardion; 8 / Daniele Pedrini / Pietro Lanfranchi; 9 / Yannick Ecoeur / Pierre Bruchez; 10 / Sébastien Baud / Yann Gachet	Women: ranking / participants; / Francesca Martinelli / Roberta Pedranzini; / Gabrielle Magnenat / Séverine Pont-Combe; / Laëtitia Roux / Véronique Lathuraz; 4 / Gloriana Pellissier / Corinne Clos; 5 / Magali Jacquemoud / Corinne Favre; 6 / Isabelle Ciferman / Alice Lauga; 7 / Monique Merrill / Sari Anderson; 8 / Nina Cook Silitch / Lyndsay Meyer; 9 / Fabienne Sestier-Carlin / Amandine Novero; 10 / Laurence Barnier-Hoffmann / Gaelle Missilier
=== 25th Pierra Menta (2010) ===
Men: ranking / participants; / Florent Troillet / Kílian Jornet Burgada; / Florent Perrier / William Bon Mardion; / Dennis Brunod / Manfred Reichegger; 4 / Lenzi Damiano / Lorenzo Holzknecht; 5 / Yannick Ecoeur / Martin Anthamatten; 6 / Daniele Pedrini / Pietro Lanfranchi; 7 / Alexandre Pellicier / Didier Blanc; 8 / Marc Pinsach Rubirola / Javier Martín de Villa; 9 / Peter Svätojánsky / Andrzej Bargiel; 10 / Raphaël Bordet / Adrien Piccot	Women: ranking / participants; / Francesca Martinelli / Roberta Pedranzini; / Laëtitia Roux / Mireia Miró Varela; / Silvia Rocca / Corinne Clos; 4 / Gabrielle Magnenat / Marie Troillet; 5 / Marit Tveite Bystøl / Oddrun Brakstad Orset; 6 / Mireille Richard / Simone Hammer; 7 / Patricia Althape-Arhondo / Cristina Bes Ginesta; 8 / Isabelle Ciferman / Annabelle Cadoux; 9 / Nina Cook Silitch / Lyndsay Meyer; 10 / Cristina Foppoli / Silvia Cuminetti
=== 26th Pierra Menta (2011) ===
Men: ranking / participants; / Didier Blanc / Kílian Jornet Burgada; / Lorenzo Holzknecht / Guido Giacomelli; / Matteo Eydallin / Denis Trento; 4 / William Bon Mardion / Martin Anthamatten; 5 / Manfred Reichegger / Damiano Lenzi; 6 / Valentin Favre / Yannick Ecoeur; 7 / Alexandre Pellicier / Florent Perrier; 8 / Marc Pinsach Rubirola / Pietro Lanfranchi; 9 / Michele Boscacci / Robert Antonioli; 10 / Xavier Gachet / Alexis Sévennec-Verdier	Women: ranking / participants; / Laëtitia Roux / Mireia Miró Varela; / Francesca Martinelli / Roberta Pedranzini; / Gabrielle Magnenat / Marie Troillet; 4 / Laura Besseghini / Raffaella Rossi; 5 / Mireille Richard / Martina Valmassoi; 6 / Izaskun Zubizarreta Guerendiain / Marta Riba Carlos; 7 / Nina Cook Silitch / Veronika Swidrak; 8 / Sandrine Favre / Émilie Favre; 9 / Cécile Pasche / Lucia Näfen; 10 / Caroline Kilchenmann / Valérie Berthod-Pellissier
=== 27th Pierra Menta (2012) ===
Men: ranking / participants; / Lorenzo Holzknecht / Manfred Reichegger; / Matteo Eydallin / Denis Trento; / Pietro Lanfranchi / William Bon Mardion; 4 / Valentin Favre / Alexis Sévennec-Verdier; 5 / Xavier Gachet / Mathéo Jacquemoud; 6 / Yannick Ecoeur / Yannick Buffet; 7 / Kílian Jornet Burgada / Marc Pinsach Rubirola; 8 / Nejc Kuhar / Filippo Beccari; 9 / Tony Sbalbi / Jean Pellissier; 10 / Daniele Cappelletti / Davide Galizzi	Women: ranking / participants; / Francesca Martinelli / Roberta Pedranzini; / Séverine Pont-Combe / Laëtitia Roux; / Gabrielle Gachet / Mireille Richard; 4 / Laura Besseghini / Corinne Clos; 5 / Valentine Fabre / Nina Cook Silitch; 6 / Marta Riba Carlos / Anna Comet Pascua; 7 / Klaudia Tasz / Magdalena Derezińska-Osiecka; 8 / Cécile Pasche / Lucia Näfen; 9 / Naila Jornet Burgada / (France) Laurence Hoffman; 10 / (France) Anne Petit / (France) Elsa Nodet
=== 28th Pierra Menta (2013) ===
Men: ranking / participants; / Mathéo Jacquemoud / William Bon Mardion; 4; 5; 6; 7; 8; 9; 10	Women: ranking / participants; / Laëtitia Roux / Mireia Miró Varela; 4; 5; 6; 7; 8; 9; 10
=== 29th Pierra Menta (2014) ===
Men: ranking / participants; / Matteo Eydallin / (Italy) Damiano Lenzi; 4; 5; 6; 7; 8; 9; 10	Women: ranking / participants; / Laëtitia Roux / Mathys Maude; 4; 5; 6; 7; 8; 9; 10
=== 30th Pierra Menta (2015) ===
Men: ranking / participants; / (Italy) Matteo Eydallin / (Italy) Damiano Lenzi; / (France) Xavier Gachet / (France) William Bon Mardion; / (Italy) Michele Boscacci / (Italy) Robert Antonioli; 4; 5; 6; 7; 8; 9; 10	Women: ranking / participants; / (France) Laëtitia Roux / (Spain) Mireia Miró Varela; / (France) Axelle Mollaret / (Sweden) Emelie Forsberg; / (Switzerland) Séverine Pont-Combe / (Switzerland) Jennifer Fiechter; 4; 5; 6; 7; 8; 9; 10
=== 31st Pierra Menta (2016) ===
Men: ranking / participants; / (France) Matheo Jacquemoud / (Spain) Kílian Jornet Burgada; / (France) William Bon Mardion / (France) Xavier Gachet; / (Italy) Michele Boscacci / (Italy) Robert Antonioli; 4; 5; 6; 7; 8; 9; 10	Women: ranking / participants; / (France) Axelle Mollaret / (France) Laetitia Roux; / (Spain) Mireia Miró Varela / (Spain) Clàudia Galicia Cotrina; / (Italy) Katia Tomatis / (Italy) Martina Valmassoi; 4 / (Switzerland) Séverine Pont-Combe / (France) Lorna Bonnel; 5 / (Sweden) Ida Nilsson / (Spain) Marta Riba; 6; 7; 8; 9; 10
=== 32nd Pierra Menta (2017) ===
Men: ranking / participants; / (Italy) Matteo Eydallin / (Italy) Damiano Lenzi; / (Spain) Kílian Jornet Burgada / (France) Alexis Sévennec-Verdier; / (Italy) Nadir Maguet / (Italy) Michele Boscacci; 4 / (France) Valentin Favre / (Italy) Filippo Barazzuol; 5 / (France) William Bon Mardion / (France) Xavier Gachet; 6 / (Slovenia) Nejc Kuhar / (Norway) Lars Erik Skjervheim; 7 / (Spain) Oriol Cardona / (Spain) Nill Cardona Coll; 8 / (Italy) Stefano Stradelli / (France) Samuel Equy; 9 / (France) Pierre-François Gachet / (France) Florent Perrier; 10 / (Italy) Filippo Beccari / (France) Joris Perillat Pessey	Women: ranking / participants; / (Sweden) Emelie Forsberg / (France) Laetitia Roux; / (Switzerland) Jennifer Fiechter / (Switzerland) Séverine Pont-Combe; / (France) Axelle Mollaret / (France) Lorna Bonnel; 4; 5; 6; 7; 8; 9; 10

== Literature ==
- Rolf Majcen: Bergauf - Abenteuer Ausdauersport (German) ISBN 978-3-900533-39-7
