= Adamello Ski Raid =

Ski mountaineering competition in Italy

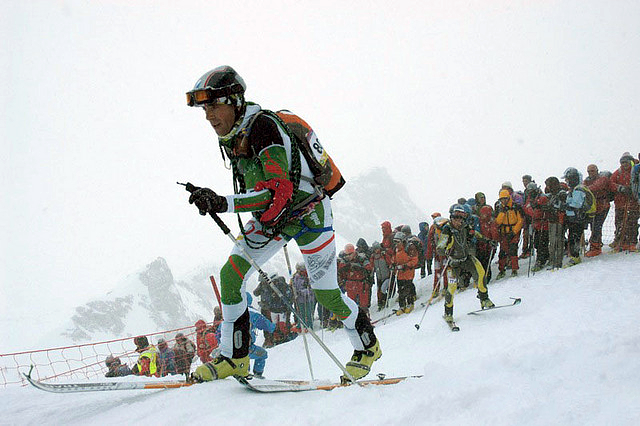
2008 Adamello Ski Raid

The Adamello Ski Raid is an annual ski mountaineering competition at the Italian Tonale Pass declared as the final race of the European Cup of Ski Mountaineering by the International Council for Ski Mountaineering Competitions (ISMC).

Starting point of the race is the Tonale Pass, and the release point is in Ponte di Legno. The 40 km race track which has to be covered in teams by three and with classical equipment includes an altitude difference of 3,400 m for the ascent and 4,000 m for skiing down. The highest point is upside 3,000 m.

The Adamello Ski Raid is a stage of La Grande Course that includes the most important ski mountaineering competitions of the season.

== Results men ==
Year	Winner	2nd	3rd
2006	(Italy) Guido Giacomelli (Italy) Mirco Mezzanotte (Italy) Hans Joerg Lungher	(Switzerland) Alexander Hug (Switzerland) Didier Moret (Switzerland) Lorenzo Holzknecht	(Italy) Ivan Murada (Italy) Graziano Boscacci (Italy) Daniele Pedrini
2008	(Italy) Martin Riz (Italy) Denis Trento (Italy) Alain Seletto	(Italy) Graziano Boscacci (Italy) Ivan Murada (Italy) Lorenzo Holzknecht	(Italy) Guido Giacomelli (Italy) Hans Joerg Lungher (Italy) Jean Pellissier
2011	(Italy) Guido Giacomelli (Italy) Lorenzo Holzknecht	(Italy) Matteo Eydallin (Italy) Damiano Lenzi	(Switzerland) Martin Anthamatten (France) William Bon Mardion
2013	(France) William Bon Mardion (France) Mathéo Jacquemoud	(Italy) Matteo Eydallin (Italy) Damiano Lenzi	(Italy) Michele Boscacci (Italy) Lorenzo Holzknecht
2015	(Italy) Matteo Eydallin (Italy) Damiano Lenzi	(Italy) Michele Boscacci (Italy) Robert Antonioli	(Switzerland) Martin Anthamatten (Germany) Anton Palzer

== Results women ==
Year	Winner	2nd	3rd
2006	(Italy) Roberta Secco (Italy) Orietta Calliari (Italy) Astrid Renzler		
2008	(Italy) Roberta Pedranzini (Italy) Francesca Martinelli (Italy) Gloriana Pellissier	(Italy) Annamarie Gross (Italy) Tamara Lunger (Italy) Maddalena Weger	(Italy) Orietta Calliari (Italy) Laura Besseghini (Italy) Raffaella Rossi
2011	(Spain) Mireia Miró Varela (France) Laetitia Roux	(Italy) Pedranzini Roberta (Italy) Francesca Martinelli	(Italy) Laura Besseghini (Italy) Raffaella Rossi
2013	(Spain) Mireia Miró Varela (France) Laetitia Roux	(France) Axelle Mollaret (Switzerland) Jennifer Fiechter	(Italy) Francesca Martinelli (Italy) Silvia Rocca
2015	(Spain) Mireia Miró Varela (France) Laetitia Roux	(France) Axelle Mollaret (Sweden) Emelie Forsberg	(Italy) Katia Tomatis (Italy) Elena Nicolini
