= Guido Giacomelli =

Italian ski mountaineer (born 1980)

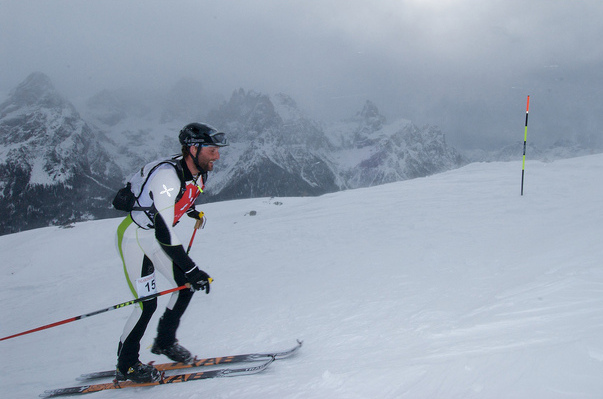
- Giacomelli at the 2010 Palaronda SkiAlp

Personal information
- Born: 5 September 1980 (age 45) Sondalo, Italy

Sport
- Sport: Skiing
Medal record
Ski mountaineering
Representing Italy
World Championships
Gold medal – first place	2006 World Championship	Relay
Gold medal – first place	2008 World Championship	Long distance
Silver medal – second place	2004 World Championship	Relay
Silver medal – second place	2008 World Championship	Team
European Championships
Gold medal – first place	2005 European Championship	Single
Gold medal – first place	2005 European Championship	Relay
Silver medal – second place	2009 European Championship	Team
Bronze medal – third place	2007 European Championship	Team

Guido Giacomelli (born 5 September 1980) is an Italian ski mountaineer.

Giacomelli was born in Sondalo. He started ski mountaineering in 1995 and competed first in the Pierra Menta race in 1998. He has been member of the national team since 2002. He has held the course record of the Mountain Attack race since 2006 and was member of the Patrouille des Glaciers record team of 2006. Giacomelli enjoys also alpine and cross-country skiing.

== Selected results ==
- 2002:
  - 1st, World Championship "espoirs" class
- 2004:
  - 2nd, World Championship relay race (together with Carlo Battel, Graziano Boscacci and Martin Riz)
  - 8th, World Championship team race (together with Mirco Mezzanotte)
- 2005:
  - 1st, European Championship single race
  - 1st. European Championship relay race (together with Dennis Brunod, Manfred Reichegger and Matteo Pedergnana)
  - 1st, Tour du Rutor (together with Mirco Mezzanotte)
  - 2nd, World Cup team (together with Mirco Mezzanotte)
  - 5th, World Cup race, Salt Lake City
- 2006:
  - 1st, World Championship relay race (together with Hansjörg Lunger, Manfred Reichegger and Dennis Brunod)
  - 1st, European Cup single
  - 1st, Adamello Ski Raid (together with Hansjörg Lunger and Mirco Mezzanotte)
  - 1st, Mountain Attack in Saalbach
  - 5th, World Championship team race (together with Hansjörg Lunger)
- 2007:
  - 1st: Gara del Pizzo Scalino (together with Daniele Pedrini)
  - 1st, Dolomiti Cup single
  - 1st, Mountain Attack
  - 1st and course record, Sellaronda Skimarathon (together with Hansjörg Lunger)
  - 1st, Trofeo "Rinaldo Maffeis" (together with Ivan Murada)
  - 3rd, European Championship team race (together with Jean Pellissier)
  - 5th, European Championship combination ranking
  - 9th, European Championship single race
- 2008:
  - 1st, World Championship long distance race
  - 1st and course record, Sellaronda Skimarathon (together with Hansjörg Lunger)
  - 1st, Dolomiti Cup team (together with Hansjörg Lunger)
  - 2nd, World Championship team race (together with Hansjörg Lunger)
- 2009:
  - 2nd, European Championship team race (together with Lorenzo Holzknecht)
- 2010:
  - 1st, Sellaronda Skimarathon (together with Hansjörg Lunger)
- 2010:
  - 1st, Trophée des Gastlosen (ISMF World Cup), together with Denis Trento

=== Trofeo Mezzalama ===
- 2003: 4th, together with Camillo Vescovo and Mirco Mezzanotte
- 2005: 1st, together with Patrick Blanc and Stéphane Brosse
- 2007: 1st, together with Jean Pellissier and Florent Troillet
- 2011: 7th, together with Lorenzo Holzknecht and Jean Pellissier

=== Pierra Menta ===
- 2005: 3rd, together with Jean Pellissier
- 2006: 2nd, together with Hansjörg Lunger
- 2007: 2nd, together with Hansjörg Lunger
- 2008: 2nd, together with Platz mit Hansjörg Lunger
- 2011: 2nd, together with Lorenzo Holzknecht

=== Patrouille des Glaciers ===
- 2006: 1st and course record, together with Patrick Blanc and Stéphane Brosse
