= Trécourt =

Trécourt is a surname. Notable people with the surname include:

- Claudine Trécourt (born 1962), French ski mountaineer
- Giacomo Trécourt (1812–1882), Italian painter
