= Boscacci =

Boscacci is an Italian surname. Notable people with the surname include:

- Graziano Boscacci (born 1969), Italian ski mountaineer
- Leticia Boscacci (born 1985), Argentine volleyball player
- Michele Boscacci (born 1990), Italian ski mountaineer, son of Graziano
