= Alexandre Pellicier =

French ski mountaineer (born 1981)

Personal information
- Born: 9 December 1981 (age 44) Tarentaise Valley, France

Sport
- Sport: Skiing
Medal record
Ski mountaineering
Representing France
World Championships
Gold medal – first place	2008 World Championship	Team
European Championships
Silver medal – second place	2007 European Championship	Team

Alexandre Pellicier (born 9 December 1981) is a French ski mountaineer.

Pellicier is born in the Tarentaise Valley and lives in Albertville. He started ski mountaineering in 1998 and competed first at Pierra Menta "juniors" race in the same year. He is a member of the Etoile Sportive du Cormet and has been member of the French national team since 2005.

== Selected results ==
- 2002:
  - 1st, French Championship "espoirs" single
- 2005:
  - 6th, European Championship team race (together with Cyril Champagne)
- 2006:
  - 8th, World Championship team race (together with Pierre Gignoux)
- 2007:
  - 2nd, European Championship team race (together with William Bon Mardion)
  - 6th, European Championship combination ranking
  - 7th, European Championship single race
- 2008:
  - 1st, World Championship team race (together with Florent Perrier)
  - 4th, World Championship combination ranking
  - 6th (and 5th in the "international men" ranking), Patrouille des Glaciers (together with Tony Sbalbi and Didier Blanc)
  - 10th, World Championship single race
- 2010:
  - 4th, World Championship team race (together with William Bon Mardion)
- 2011:
  - 5th, World Championship sprint
  - 5th, World Championship team race (together with Valentin Favre)

=== Pierra Menta ===
- 2006: 6th, together with Cyril Champagne
- 2007: 3rd, together with Bertrand Blanc
- 2008: 5th, together with Ola Berger
- 2009: 6th, together with Grégory Gachet
- 2010: 7th, together with Didier Blanc
- 2011: 7th, together with Florent Perrier
