= Danielle Hacquard =

French ski mountaineer (born 1961)

Personal information
- Born: 1961 (age 64–65)

Sport
- Sport: Skiing
- Club: SC Val d'Isère
Medal record
Representing France

Danielle Hacquard (born 1961) is a French ski mountaineer who competed successfully in the three best known races of the Alps (French: les grandes trois de ski de montagne), the Pierra Menta, the Patrouille des Glaciers and the Trofeo Mezzalama. She is member of the SC Val d'Isère.

== Results ==
- 1992: 6th, Pierra Menta, together with Pierre Buttin
- 1994: 2nd, Pierra Menta, together with Isabel Rogé Tartarini
- 1995: 3rd, Pierra Menta, together with Isabel Rogé Tartarini
- 1996: 2nd, Pierra Menta, together with Isabel Rogé Tartarini
- 1997: 2nd, Pierra Menta, together with Véronique Lathuraz
- 1998:
  - 2nd, Pierra Menta, together with Véronique Lathuraz
  - 3rd, Patrouille des Glaciers, together with Corinne Favre and Véronique Lathuraz
- 1999:
  - 1st, Pierra Menta, together with Claudine Trécourt
  - 1st, Trofeo Mezzalama, together with Gloriana Pellissier and Véronique Lathuraz
