= Bourillon =

Bourillon may refer to:

- Grégory Bourillon (born 1984), French soccer player
- Nathalie Bourillon (born 1965), French ski mountaineer
