= Lorenzo Holzknecht =

Italian ski mountaineer (1984–2023)

Personal information
- Nationality: Italy
- Born: 12 December 1984 Sondalo, Italy
- Died: 13 April 2023 (aged 38) Val di Rhêmes, Italy
- Height: 178 – 68kg

Sport
- Sport: Skiing
Medal record
Ski mountaineering
Representing Italy
World Championships
Gold medal – first place	2010 World Championship	Relay
Silver medal – second place	2011 World Championship	Team
Bronze medal – third place	2010 World Championship	Team
Bronze medal – third place	2015 World Championship	Team
European Championships
Gold medal – first place	2009 European Championship	Relay
Gold medal – first place	2012 European Championship	Team
Silver medal – second place	2009 European Championship	Team
Bronze medal – third place	2009 European Championship	Single

Lorenzo Holzknecht (12 December 1984 – 13 April 2023) was an Italian ski mountaineer.

== Early life and career ==
Holzknecht was born in Sondalo on 12 December 1984. He started ski mountaineering in 2001 and competed first in the same year. He became a member of the national team in 2002.

== Death ==
Holzknecht died alongside two other people in an avalanche near the Tsanteleina mountain on 13 April 2023. He was 38.

== Selected results ==
- 2004:
  - 3rd, World Championship ind. "juniors" class race
- 2007:
  - 1st U23, European Championship vertical race (Morzine- Avoriaz)
  - 1st U23, European Championship ind. race
  - 1st U23 Pierra Menta
- 2008:
  - 1st, Trofeo Angelo Gherardi
  - 7th, World Championship team race (together with Ivan Murada)
  - 2nd, Adamello Ski Raid
- 2009:
  - 1st, European Championship relay race (together with Dennis Brunod, Manfred Reichegger and Damiano Lenzi)
  - 2nd, European Championship team race (together with Guido Giacomelli)
  - 3rd, European Championship ind. race
  - 3rd, European Championship combination ranking
  - 3rd, Valtellina Orobie World Cup race
  - 1st, Vertical race Italian Championship
  - 3rd, ind race Italian Championship
- 2010
  - 1st, World Championship relay race (together with Damiano Lenzi, Dennis Brunod and Manfred Reichegger)
  - 3rd, World Championship team race (together with Damiano Lenzi)
- 2011:
  - 2nd Overall Pierra Menta
  - 2nd, World Championship team race (together with Manfred Reichegger)
  - 1st, Team Race Italian Championship
- 2012:
  - 1st Overall Pierra Menta
  - 2nd, La Grand Course Overall
  - 1st, European Championship team, together with Manfred Reichegger
  - 10th, European Championship ind.
  - 1st, Sellaronda Skimarathon (together with Michele Boscacci)
  - 2nd, 2012 Crested Butte Ski Mountaineering Race, single and total ranking
  - 3rd, 2012 Crested Butte Ski Mountaineering Race, sprint
  - 1st, Vertical race Italian Championship
- 2013
  - 3rd Overall Pierra Menta
  - 3rd Overall Mezzalama Trophy
  - 3rd Overall Adamello Ski Raid
  - 1st, Team Race Italian Championship
  - 1st Overall Italian Cup
- 2014
  - 2nd Overall Sellaronda Skimarathon
  - 3rd, ind race Italian Championship
- 2015
  - 3rd, Vertical Race World Championships of Ski Mountaineering (Verbier)
  - 1st Overall Sellaronda Skimarathon (new Record)
  - 2nd Overall Mezzalama Trophy
  - 3rd, Vertical race Italian Championship
- 2016
  - 1st Overall Sellaronda Skimarathon

=== Pierra Menta ===
- 2002: 1st, cadets class race
- 2010: 4th, together with Damiano Lenzi
- 2011: 2nd, together with Guido Giacomelli
- 2012: 1st, together with Manfred Reichegger

=== Trofeo Mezzalama ===
- 2007: 6th, together with Daniele Pedrini and Mattia Coletti
- 2011: 7th, together with Guido Giacomelli and Jean Pellissier
