= Véronique Lathuraz =

French ski mountaineer (born 1968)

Personal information
- Born: 2 July 1968 (age 58)

Sport
- Sport: Skiing
Medal record
Women's ski mountaineering
Representing France
World Championships
Silver medal – second place	2004 Spain	Relay
Bronze medal – third place	2002 France	Team
Bronze medal – third place	2006 Italy	Relay
Bronze medal – third place	2008 Switzerland	Relay
European Championships
Silver medal – second place	2007 France	Relay
Silver medal – second place	2007 France	Team
Bronze medal – third place	2003 Slovakia	Team
Bronze medal – third place	2009 Italy	Relay

Véronique Lathuraz (born 2 July 1968) is a French ski mountaineer.

== Selected results ==
- 1997:
  - 3rd, French national ranking
- 1998:
  - 3rd, French national ranking
- 2001:
  - 8th, European Championship team race (together with Anne Laure Fourneaux)
- 2002:
  - 1st, French Championship single
  - 3rd, World Championship team race (together with Nathalie Bourillon)
  - 7th, World Championship combination ranking
  - 10th, World Championship single race
- 2003:
  - 3rd, European Championship team race (together with Corinne Favre)
  - 9th, European Championship single race
- 2004
  - 2nd, World Championship relay race (together with Nathalie Bourillon and Delphine Oggeri)
  - 5th, World Championship team race (together with Nathalie Bourillon)
  - 6th, World Championship combination ranking
  - 7th, World Championship single race
- 2005:
  - 1st, Tour du Rutor (together with Nathalie Bourillon)
  - 4th, European Championship relay race (together with Nathalie Bourillon and Valentine Fabre)
  - 8th, European Championship team race (together with Nathalie Bourillon)
- 2006:
  - 3rd, World Championship relay race (together with Carole Toïgo, Nathalie Bourillon and Corinne Favre)
  - 5th, World Championship team race (together with Nathalie Bourillon)
- 2007:
  - 2nd, European Championship team race (together with Corinne Favre)
  - 2nd, European Championship ralley race (together with Corinne Favre and Laëtitia Roux)
  - 5th, European Championship combination ranking
- 2008:
  - 3rd, World Championship relay race (together with Corinne Favre, Nathalie Bourillon and Valentine Fabre)
  - 5th, World Championship team race (together with Valentine Fabre)
  - 6th, World Championship vertical race
  - 7th, World Championship long-distance race
- 2009:
  - 1st, Sci Alpinistica dell'Adamello
  - 1st, Transclautana
  - 3rd, European Championship relay race (together with Corinne Favre and Laëtitia Roux)

=== Patrouille des Glaciers ===
- 1998, 3rd, together with Danielle Hacquard and Corinne Favre
- 2006: 2nd, together with Nathalie Bourillon and Corinne Favre

=== Trofeo Mezzalama ===
- 1999: 1st, together with Gloriana Pellissier and Danielle Hacquard
- 2007: 2nd, together with Nathalie Bourillon and Corinne Favre

=== Pierra Menta ===
- 1997: 2nd, together with Danielle Hacquard
- 1998: 2nd, together with Danielle Hacquard
- 1999: 3rd, together with Alexia Zuberer
- 2000: 5th, together with Sigrid Tomio
- 2002: 3rd, together with Véronique Lathuraz
- 2005: 2nd, together with Nathalie Bourillon
- 2007: 3rd, together with Valentine Fabre
- 2008: 4th, together with Corinne Favre
- 2009: 3rd, together with Laëtitia Roux
