= 2002 World Championship of Ski Mountaineering =

The 2002 World Championship of Ski Mountaineering (French: Championnats du Monde de Ski de Montagne 2002) was the first World Championship of Ski Mountaineering sanctioned by the International Council for Ski Mountaineering Competitions (ISMC), held at Serre Chevalier in the former French province Dauphiné from January 24 to January 27, 2002. In due to the heavy snowfall all events were postponed one day

The event was supported by the Fédération française de la montagne et de l’escalade (FFME). The 230 participants were from 22 nations and from three continents. Compared to the 1975 Trofeo Mezzalama, which was also held as "World Championship of Ski Mountaineering" with the classes "Civilians", "Soldiers" and "Mountain guides", the ICSM competition was only for members of the civilian national squads. Participants from countries without a squad could register with the help of the national mountain organizations.

== Equipment ==
The equipment of the participants was very different:

The start line scene set the stage, with all the techno-light skis of the Europeans

contrasted with a pair of ‘fat’ skis and then a pair of ‘tele’ skis representing Team Canada. Our race suits were Gore-Tex, not Lycra, and we had no logos. By the graciousness of some other countries being slower than us, we did not place last. The best line we heard was from the Polish team, whom we passed on the downhill at high speed saying, “You guys can sure ski down hill fast.” Which meant that we were very

slow on the uphills!

— team race's report of the Canadian athlete Richard Haywood, ACMG

The weight of the ultra-light skis of the European top teams was only about including binding. These teams also had the mentioned race suits as well as long and light Nordic skiing poles.

== Results ==
=== Nation ranking and medals ===
(all age groups)

| ranking | country | individual | | | | team | | | | |
| ranking | country | points | | | | points | | | | total points |
|---|---|---|---|---|---|---|---|---|---|---|
| 1 | France | 1122 | 3 | 3 | 4 | 510 | 1 | 2 | 1 | 1632 |
| 2 | Italy | 812 | 2 | 3 | 2 | 426 | 1 | | | 1238 |
| 3 | Switzerland | 842 | 2 | 2 | 1 | 312 | | | | 1154 |
| 4 | Slovakia | 542 | | | | 252 | | | 1 | 794 |
| 5 | Spain | 582 | | | 1 | 196 | | | | 778 |
| 6 | Germany | 132 | | | | 144 | | | | 276 |
| 7 | Andorra | 184 | 1 | | | 72 | | | | 256 |
| 8 | Austria | 92 | | | | 90 | | | | 182 |
| 9 | Bulgaria | 127 | | | | 22 | | | | 149 |
| 10 | Poland | 45 | | | | 74 | | | | 119 |
| 11 | Romania | 61 | | | | 30 | | | | 91 |
| 12 | Liechtenstein | 66 | | | | | | | | 66 |
| 13 | Czech Republic | 2 | | | | 56 | | | | 58 |
| 14 | Greece | 3 | | | | 32 | | | | 35 |
| 15 | Belgium | 3 | | | | 22 | | | | 25 |
| 16 | United States | 21 | | | | | | | | 21 |
| 17 | Canada | 1 | | | | 10 | | | | 11 |
| 18 | Argentina | 1 | | | | 8 | | | | 9 |
| 19 | Chile | | | | | 4 | | | | 4 |
| 20 | Russia | 2 | | | | 2 | | | | 4 |
| 21 | Denmark | | | | | 2 | | | | 2 |
| 22 | South Korea | | | | | 1 | | | | 1 |

=== Team ===
event held on January 24, 2002
length: 19 kilometers
altitude differences:

- ascent: 1,623m
- downhill: 1,623m

List of the 10 best teams by gender:

==== Women ====
| ranking | team | total time |
|---|---|---|
| | Ducognon/Oggeri | 02h 26' 13.24" |
| | Favre/Toïgo | 02h 29' 11.63" |
| | Bourillon/Lathuraz | 02h 29' 31.10" |
| 4 | Raso/Pellissier | 02h 31' 44.45" |
| 5 | Luyet/Mabillard | 02h 32' 37.23" |
| 6 | Madajová/Paliderová | 02h 35' 27.82" |
| 7 | Vaudey/S. Champange | 02h 37' 18.92" |
| 8 | Gachet/Guet | 02h 41' 14.36" |
| 9 | Baudena/Bones | 02h 43' 26.67" |
| 10 | Zimmermann/Magnenat | 02h 44' 03.82" |

==== Men ====
| ranking | team | total time |
|---|---|---|
| | Murada/Boscacci | 01h 56' 34.16" |
| | Sbalbi/Patrick Blanc | 01h 57' 34.77" |
| | Leitner/Svätojánsky | 01h 58' 27.14" |
| 4 | B. Blanc/C. Champange | 01h 58' 57.21" |
| 5 | Brosse/Gignoux | 01h 59' 30.43" |
| 6 | Meilleur/Tomio | 02h 00' 26.17" |
| 7 | Hug/Schuwey | 02h 00' 35" |
| 8 | Fontana/Negroni | 02h 01' 22.33" |
| 9 | Nicolini/Mezzanotte | 02h 01' 27.84" |
| 10 | Trizna/Madaj | 02h 02' 23.82" |

=== Individual ===
event held on January 27, 2002

- male participants total (all age groups): 90
- female participants total (all age groups): 34
- altitude difference:
  - ascent: 1,505m
  - downhill: 1,505m

List of the best 10 participants by gender:

==== Women ====
| ranking | participant | total time |
|---|---|---|
| | Valérie Ducognon | 01h 51' 59" |
| | Gloriana Pellissier | 01h 51' 59.3" |
| | Catherine Mabillard | 01h 56' 28" |
| 4 | Delphine Oggeri | 01h 57' 12.63" |
| 5 | Corinne Favre | 01h 58' 02" |
| 6 | Jana Madajová | 02h 00' 02" |
| 7 | Carole Toïgo | 02h 00' 14" |
| 8 | Anne Bochatay | 02h 00' 50" |
| 9 | Miroslava Paliderová | 02h 00' 51" |
| 10 | Véronique Lathuraz | 02h 01' 05" |

==== Men ====
| ranking | participant | total time |
|---|---|---|
| | Stéphane Brosse | 01h 29' 31.43" |
| | Patrick Blanc | 01h 30' 34.25" |
| | Carlo Battel | 01h 31' 38.79" |
| 4 | Ivan Murada | 01h 32' 29.18" |
| 5 | Cédric Tomio | 01h 32' 57" |
| 6 | Pierre-Marie Taramarcaz | 01h 34' 48" |
| 7 | Alexander Hug | 01h 34' 52.73" |
| 8 | Olivier Nägele | 01h 35' 05" |
| 9 | Fabio Meraldi | 01h 35' 22" |
| 10 | Emmanuel Blanc | 01h 35' 23.39" |

=== Combination ranking ===
(individual and team rankings)

List of the best 10 participants by gender:

==== Women ====
| ranking | participant |
|---|---|
| | Valérie Ducognon |
| | Delphine Oggeri |
| | Gloriana Pellissier |
| 4 | Corinne Favre |
| 5 | Catherine Mabillard |
| 6 | Carole Toïgo |
| 7 | Véronique Lathuraz |
| 8 | Nathalie Bourillon |
| 9 | Jana Madajová |
| 10 | Miroslava Paliderová |

==== Men ====
| ranking | participant |
|---|---|
| | Patrick Blanc |
| | Stéphane Brosse |
| | Ivan Murada |
| 4 | Graziano Boscacci |
| 5 | Cédric Tomio |
| 6 | Tony Sbalbi |
| 7 | Bertrand Blanc |
| 8 | Alexander Hug |
| 9 | Cyril Champange |
| 10 | Luciano Fontana |
