= Stéphane Brosse =

French ski mountaineer

Personal information
- Born: 20 October 1971 Le Pont-de-Beauvoisin, Savoie, France
- Died: 17 June 2012 (aged 40) Aiguille d'Argentière, France

Sport
- Sport: Skiing
Medal record
Men's ski mountaineering
Representing France
World Championships
Gold medal – first place	2002 France	Single
Gold medal – first place	2004 Spain	Relay
Gold medal – first place	2006 Italy	Team
Silver medal – second place	2006 Italy	Relay
European Championships
Gold medal – first place	2001 France	Team
Silver medal – second place	2003 Slovakia	Single

Stéphane Brosse (20 October 1971 – 17 June 2012) was a French ski mountaineer.

== Biography ==
Brosse was born in Le Pont-de-Beauvoisin, Savoie. He started ski mountaineering in 1990 and competed the first time at the Miage Contamines Somfy race in 1995. In 1996 he became a member of the national team. Together with Pierre Gignoux he set the record and continued to hold it for the Mont Blanc course from 30 May 2003. The duo needed a total time of 5h 15' 47" for the total course, thereof about 4 hours and seven minutes for climbing up, and about one hour and seven minutes for the downhill race. Since 2003 he and Lionel Bonnel had also held the Chamonix-Zermatt Haute Route record with 21h 11'.

Stéphane Brosse died on 17 June 2012 while crossing the Aiguille d'Argentière in the Mont Blanc massif when a snow cornice collapsed under him, resulting in him falling between 600 and 700 metres. He was accompanied by Kílian Jornet Burgada, Sébastien Montaz-Rosset and Bastien Fleury. Brosse lived in Annecy. He was 40.

== Selected results ==
- 1997:
  - 5th, French Championship
  - 5th, French Cup
- 1998:
  - 3rd, French Cup
  - 4th, European Cup
- 1999:
  - 1st, French Championship team (together with Patrice Bret)
  - 3rd, French national ranking
  - 6th, European Championship team race (together with Patrice Bret)
- 2000:
  - 3rd, French national ranking
- 2001:
  - 1st, European Championship team race (together with Pierre Gignoux)
  - 1st, Trophée des Gastlosen (European Cup, together with Pierre Gignoux)
  - 2nd, French national ranking
- 2002:
  - 1st, World Championship single race
  - 1st, Tour du Rutor (together with Pierre Gignoux)
  - 2nd, World Championship combination ranking
  - 5th, World Championship team race together with Pierre Gignoux
- 2003:
  - 1st, Dolomiti Cup team (together with Pierre Gignoux)
  - 2nd, European Championship single race
  - 2nd, European Championship combination ranking
  - 4th, European Championship team race together with Gignoux
- 2004:
  - 1st, World Championship relay race together with Cédric Tomio, Florent Perrier and Patrick Blanc
  - 1st, Transcavallo race together with Gignoux
- 2005:
  - 2nd, World Cup single race, Salt Lake City
  - 3rd, World Cup team race together with Patrick Blanc
- 2006:
  - 1st, World Championship team race together with Patrick Blanc
  - 2nd, World Championship relay race together with Gachet, Florent Perrier and Patrick Blanc

=== Pierra Menta ===
- 1997: 10th, together with Patrice Bret
- 1998: 7th, together with Patrice Bret
- 1999: 3rd, together with Patrice Bret
- 2000: 3rd, together with Patrice Bret
- 2001: 1st, together with Pierre Gignoux
- 2002: 2nd, together with Pierre Gignoux
- 2003: 2nd, together with Pierre Gignoux
- 2005: 1st, together with Patrick Blanc
- 2006: 1st, together with Patrick Blanc

=== Trofeo Mezzalama ===
- 2001: 2nd, together with Jean Pellissier and Fabio Meraldi
- 2003: 2nd, together with Jean Pellissier and Pierre Gignoux
- 2005: 1st, together with Patrick Blanc and Guido Giacomelli

=== Patrouille des Glaciers ===
- 2000: 5th (and 3rd in "seniors I" class ranking), together with Francis Bibollet and Pierre Gignoux
- 2004: 1st in record time, together with Jean Pellissier and Patrick Blanc
- 2006: 1st in record time, together with Patrick Blanc and Guido Giacomelli
