= Bertrand Blanc =

French ski mountaineer

Personal information
- Born: 29 October 1973 (age 52) Bourg-Saint-Maurice, France

Sport
- Sport: Skiing
Medal record
Representing France
Ski mountaineering
Bronze medal – third place	2007 European Championship	Relay

Bertrand Blanc (born 29 October 1973) is a French ski mountaineer.

Blanc is born in Bourg-Saint-Maurice. He started ski mountaineering in 1992 and competed first at the Pierra Menta race in 1994. He has been member of the national team since 2000.

== Selected results ==
- 2001:
  - 4th, European Championship team race (together with Cyril Champange)
- 2002:
  - 4th, World Championship team race (together with Cyril Champange)
  - 7th, World Championship combination ranking
- 2003:
  - 7th, European Championship team race (together with Cyril Champange)
- 2005:
  - 4th, European Championship team race (together with Vincent Meilleur)
  - 4th, European Championship relay race (together with Florent Perrier, Grégory Gachet and Tony Sbalbi)
  - 8th, European Championship single race
- 2007:
  - 3rd, European Championship relay race (together with Yannick Buffet, Tony Sbalbi and Fabien Anselmet)
  - 7th, European Championship team race (together with Yannick Buffet)

=== Pierra Menta ===
- 1999: 10th, together with Cyril Champange
- 2000: 9th, together with Cyril Champange
- 2001: 6th, together with Cyril Champange
- 2002: 5th, together with Cyril Champange
- 2003: 4th, together with Cyril Champange
- 2004: 7th, together with Cyril Champange
- 2006: 5th, together with Vincent Meilleur
- 2007: 3rd, together with Alexandre Pellicier

=== Trofeo Mezzalama ===
- 2003: 7th, together with Grégory Gachet and Cyril Champange

=== Patrouille des Glaciers ===
- 2008: 2nd, together with Florent Perrier and Grégory Gachet
