= Florent Perrier =

French ski mountaineer (born 1973)

Personal information
- Born: 26 June 1973 (age 53) Arêches, France

Sport
- Sport: Skiing
- Club: Club Multisports Arêches-Beaufort
Medal record
Ski mountaineering
Representing France
World Championships
Gold medal – first place	2004 World Championship	Team
Gold medal – first place	2004 World Championship	Relay
Gold medal – first place	2008 World Championship	Single
Gold medal – first place	2008 World Championship	Vertical race
Gold medal – first place	2008 World Championship	Team
Gold medal – first place	2010 World Championship	Team
Silver medal – second place	2004 World Championship	Single
Silver medal – second place	2004 World Championship	Vertical race
Silver medal – second place	2006 World Championship	Team
Silver medal – second place	2006 World Championship	Relay
Silver medal – second place	2008 World Championship	Long distance
Bronze medal – third place	2006 World Championship	Vertical race
Bronze medal – third place	2010 World Championship	Vertical race
Bronze medal – third place	2010 World Championship	Relay
European Championships
Gold medal – first place	2005 European Championship	Team
Gold medal – first place	2007 European Championship	Single
Gold medal – first place	2007 European Championship	Vertical race
Gold medal – first place	2007 European Championship	Team
Silver medal – second place	2005 European Championship	Single
Silver medal – second place	2005 European Championship	Vertical race

Florent Perrier (born 26 June 1973) is a French ski mountaineer.

Perrier was born in Arêches, where he is member of the Club Multisports Arêches-Beaufort. In 2004, he joined the French national selection. In 2008, he was president of the athletes' committee of competition ski mountaineering in the Management Committee of the Union Internationale des Associations d'Alpinisme (UIAA).

== Selected results ==
- 2004:
  - 1st, World Championship team race (together with Patrick Blanc)
  - 1st, World Championship relay race (together with Stéphane Brosse, Cédric Tomio and Patrick Blanc)
  - 1st, World Championship combination ranking
  - 2nd, World Championship single race
  - 2nd, World Championship vertical race
- 2005:
  - 1st, World Cup race in Salt Lake City
  - 1st, European Championship team race (together with Grégory Gachet)
  - 2nd, European Championship vertical race
  - 2nd, European Championship single race
  - 4th, European Championshiprelay race (together with Bertrand Blanc, Grégory Gachet and Tony Sbalbi)
- 2006:
  - 1st, Swiss Championship vertical race
  - 2nd, World Championship team race (together with Grégory Gachet)
  - 2nd, World Championship relay race (together with Bertrand Blanc, Grégory Gachet and Stéphane Brosse)
  - 3rd, World Championship vertical race
- 2007:
  - 1st, European Championship single race
  - 1st, European Championship vertical race
  - 1st, European Championship team race (together with Grégory Gachet)
  - 1st, European Championship combination ranking
  - 2nd, Trofeo Mezzalama (together with Grégory Gachet and Patrick Blanc)
  - 4th, World Cup
- 2008:
  - 1st, World Championship single race
  - 1st, World Championship vertical race
  - 1st, World Championship team race (together with Alexandre Pellicier)
  - 1st, World Championship combination ranking
  - 2nd, World Championship long distance race
  - 3rd, World Cup race, Val d'Aran
- 2009:
  - 4th, European Championship single race
  - 6th, Alexandre Pellicier team race (together with Alexandre Pellicier)
  - 6th, European Championship combination ranking
  - 9th, European Championship vertical race
- 2010:
  - 1st, World Championship team race (together with Didier Blanc)
  - 2nd, World Championship combination ranking
  - 3rd, World Championship vertical race
  - 3rd, World Championship relay race (together with Didier Blanc, William Bon Mardion and Grégory Gachet)
  - 6th, World Championship single race
- 2011:
  - 5th, World Championship vertical race

=== Pierra Menta ===
- 2004: 3rd, together with Grégory Gachet
- 2005: 2nd, together with Grégory Gachet
- 2007: 1st, together with Grégory Gachet
- 2009: 3rd, together with Yannick Buffet
- 2010: 2nd, together with William Bon Mardion
- 2011: 7th, together with Alexandre Pellicier
- 2013: 5th, together with Xavier Gachet
