= Mountain Wilderness =

International non-governmental organization

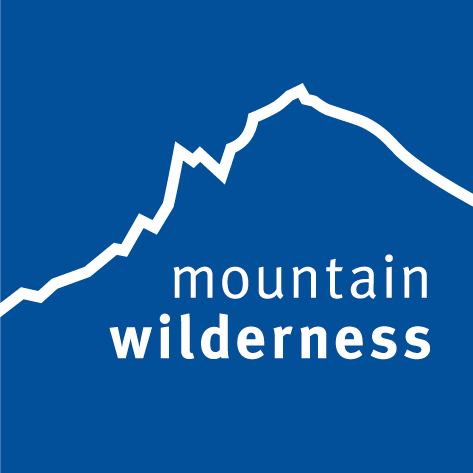
- Founded: 1987, Biella, Italy
- Purpose: Environmentalism, mountain
- Region served: Global
- Method: Organization of events, campaigns, lobbying,, consultancy
- Website: www.mountainwilderness.org

Mountain Wilderness is an international non-governmental organization dedicated to the preservation of mountain areas, in their natural and cultural aspects. The organization was founded in Europe and has a stronger presence in alpine and pyrenean regions. It has, however, a worldwide reach, with representatives and actions on all continents.

== Objectives ==
Mountain Wilderness shares some of the values and objectives of mountaineering clubs, nature conservation organizations and environmental NGOs, but with clearly distinctinve positions and orientations. Mountain Wilderness was founded by mountaineers and places a strong emphasis on the human experience of wilderness as grounded in individual freedom and responsibility. This humanistic stance originally took precedence on the exclusive defense of wildness, wildlands or wildlife for their own sake. Even in the most remote mountain regions, there remain vanishingly few untouched wilderness zones in a strict sense. Contrary to what a literal interpretation would suggest, Mountain Wilderness does not focus on such ideally pure, pristine wilderness. Nearly all mountain landscapes, and, to an even higher degree, the perception of mountains by humans, bear a strong cultural imprint. Mountain Wilderness works towards the inclusive preservation of this natural and cultural mountain environment at large. This has been accomplished by, among others:

- furthering activities and practices that foster self-reliance, respect for nature and the shared enjoyment of mountains by all those who love them
- opposing aggressive activities, such as recreational off-roading, snowmobiling, heli-skiing, and more generally the commercialization, overdevelopment and exclusive appropriation of mountains by those who just want to exploit them.
- fostering a naturally and culturally respectful development of mountain regions, to ensure a sustainable future for those who choose to live there

== History ==
Mountain Wilderness was founded in 1987 in Biella, Italy during an international conference convened by Ludovico Sella, scion of a prominent piedmontese family of financiers, statesmen and mountaineers, among which Quintino Sella, the 19th century founder of the Italian Alpine Club. This conference was a follow-up to a similar gathering of mountaineers convened by the Italian Academic Alpine Club on 8 August 1986, on the occasion of the 200th anniversary of the first ascent of the Mont-Blanc. On this occasion, a "manifesto for Mont Blanc" was issued and signed by a number of renowned mountaineers, among which Sir Chris Bonington, Yvon Chouinard, Reinhold Messner, Doug Scott. This manifesto called for a foundational human right to "open spaces for free adventure". The Biella conference attracted a larger attendance of mountaineers and intellectuals from all over the world, several of whom were to become founding guarantors and founding members of Mountain Wilderness. Among them were Haroun Tazieff, Kurt Diemberger, Jim Bridwell, John Hunt, Wanda Rutkiewicz. The "Biella theses", on which the above mission statement is based, were written during this meeting.

== Actions ==
Some of the earliest and most visible actions led by Mountain Wilderness at the international level have been:

- Demonstration at Pointe Helbronner on 16 August 1986, against the Vallee Blanche Aerial Tramway, a gondola lift that crosses the "Vallée Blanche" from Aiguille du Midi to the col du Géant above Courmayeur, desecrating the very heart of the Mont Blanc massif, a wilderness area of foremost symbolic and cultural significance for Europe. During this demonstration, Reinhold Messner climbed atop one of the gondola towers to hang a protest banner.

Although Mountain Wilderness had yet to be formally established as an organization when this took place, it was later perceived as an inaugural event. The daring, spectacular character of this action inspired comparisons to similar actions by Greenpeace, but later demonstrations by Mountain Wilderness have generally been more modest. All have been peaceful and none of them against the law.

- "Free K2" expedition organised in 1990 on K2, the second highest mountain in the word, to remove fixed ropes and discarded gear left behind by all expeditions that had attempted the ascent.
- Campaign to protect Mount Olympus in Greece from a huge development project. A manifesto was issued at the end of 1993 and an international petition was signed by intellectuals and writers from all over the world, among which five Nobel laureates. The project was withdrawn in 1995, after this petition was delivered to the Greek government.
- Oxus, mountains for peace, an expedition organised to climb Mount Noshaq, the highest peak in Afghanistan, in the Wakhan Corridor and the Hindu Kush range, in 2003: this event was intended to promote sustainable outdoor tourism in this country and to serve as a symbol of a possible return to peace and normalcy, after the civil war and the fall of the Taliban regime, during which all manner of tourism had completely disappeared.

== Guarantors ==
Guarantors of Mountain Wilderness are a group of intellectuals, writers, mountaineers, world-travelers, who are recognized through their achievements and their long-time commitment to the shared values of Mountain Wilderness. They play the roles of international representatives and advisors for the association.

Among noted former or current guarantors are : Sir Edmund Hillary (NZ) (who was long-time honorary president of Mountain Wilderness), Sir Chris Bonington (UK), John Hunt (UK), Reinhold Messner (IT), Jean-Christophe Lafaille (FR), Haroun Tazieff (FR), Wanda Rutkiewicz (PL), Jim Bridwell, Fausto De Stefani (IT), Kurt Diemberger (AT), Patrick Gabarrou (FR), Roberto Osio (IT), Alessandro Gogna (IT), Carlo Alberto Pinelli (IT) (former international coordinator)

== National chapters of Mountain Wilderness ==
- Catalonia
- France
- Germany
- Italy
- Spain
- Switzerland

National chapters have also existed at some time in Austria, Belgium, Greece, Pakistan, Slovenia, the Netherlands, the UK, but are not currently active as established organizations in their own right, though individual members may remain active in these countries.
