= Sondalo =

- Comune
- Comune di Sondalo, Città di Sondalo
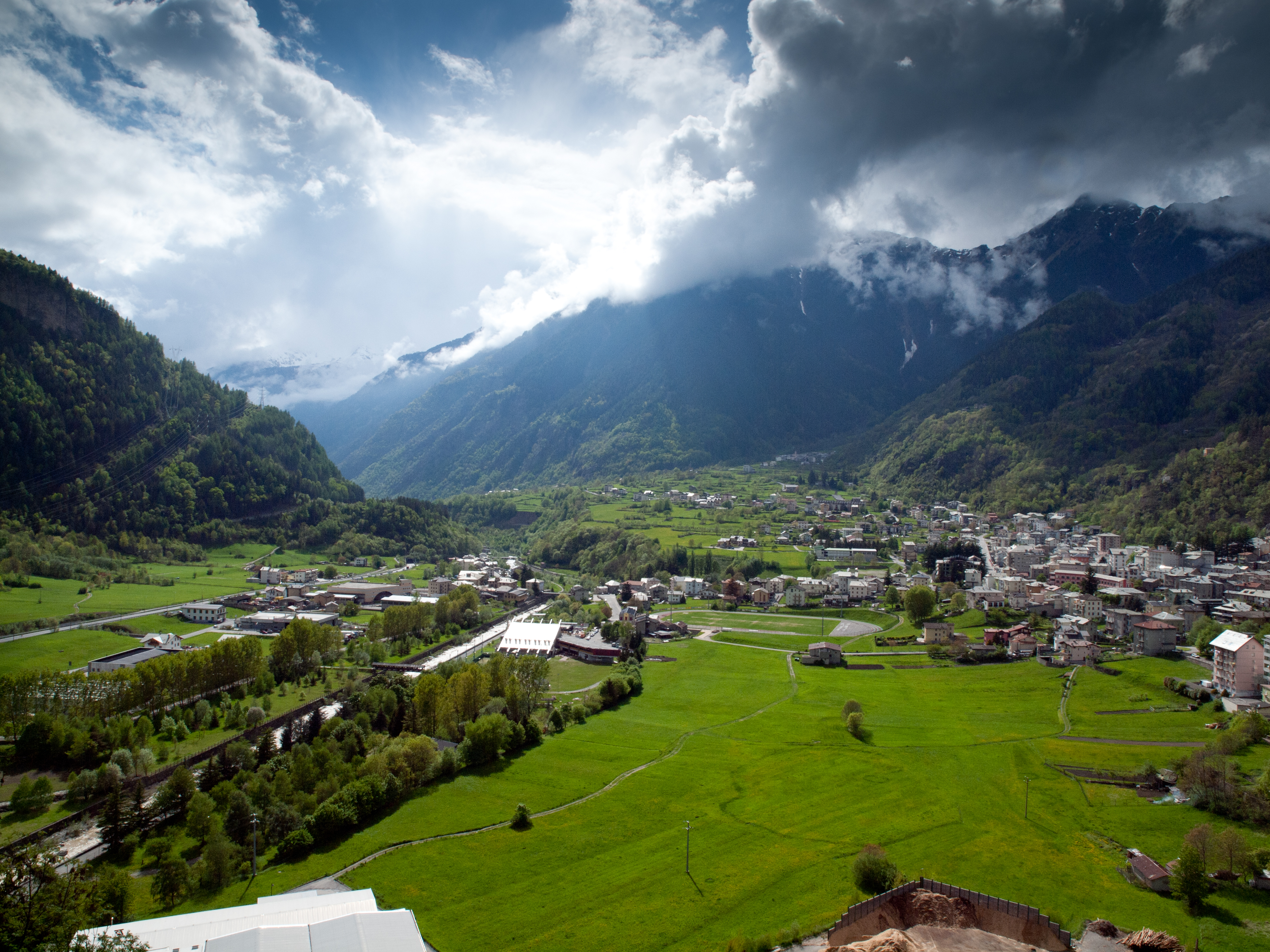
- Aerial view of the town

- Coat of arms

- Location within Italy Location within Lombardy
- Coordinates: 46°20′N 10°20′E
- Country: Italy
- Region: Lombardy
- Province: Sondrio (SO)
- Frazioni: Migiondo, Sommacologna, Somtiolo, Mondadizza, Grailè, Le Prese, Frontale, Fumero, Taronno, Montefeleito

Government
  - Mayor: Francesca Giordani

Area
  - Total: 96.1 km^{2} (37.1 sq mi)
- Elevation: 946 m (3,104 ft)

Population (December 2004)
  - Total: 4,537
  - Density: 47.2/km^{2} (122/sq mi)
- Demonym: Sondalini
- Time zone: UTC+1 (CET)
  - Summer (DST): UTC+2 (CEST)
- Postal code: 23035
- Dialing code: 0342
- Patron saint: St. Agnes
- Saint day: 21 January
- Website: Official website

Sondalo (Sondel in Valtellinese dialect) is a comune (municipality) in the Province of Sondrio in the Italian region Lombardy, located about 130 kilometres (81 mi) northeast of Milan and about 40 kilometres (25 mi) northeast of Sondrio.

Sondalo borders the following municipalities: Grosio, Ponte di Legno, Valdisotto, Valfurva, and Vezza d'Oglio.

Sondalo is home to the E. Morelli Hospital, a 3000-bed facility formerly run as a tuberculosis sanitarium.

== Demographic evolution ==
Historical population

Year	Pop.	±%
1861	2,941	—
1871	3,103	+5.5%
1881	3,101	−0.1%
1901	3,177	+2.5%
1911	3,732	+17.5%

Year	Pop.	±%
1921	3,469	−7.0%
1931	3,143	−9.4%
1936	3,819	+21.5%
1951	4,806	+25.8%
1961	5,434	+13.1%

Year	Pop.	±%
1971	5,728	+5.4%
1981	5,217	−8.9%
1991	4,954	−5.0%
2001	4,499	−9.2%

Source: Data from ISTAT

== Notable people ==
- The Italian ski mountaineers Mattia Coletti, Elisa Fleischmann, Lorenzo Holzknecht and Guido Giacomelli were born in Sondalo.
