= Caroline Kilchenmann =

Swiss biathlete and ski mountaineer

Personal information
- Born: August 2, 1984 (age 41) Fribourg, Switzerland

Sport
- Sport: Skiing
- Club: Sci Club Hochmatt im Fang
Medal record
Biathlon
Gold medal – first place	2005 Swiss championships	Individual
Gold medal – first place	2007 Swiss championships	Sprint
Gold medal – first place	2007 Swiss championships	Pursuit
Silver medal – second place	2005 Swiss championships	Sprint
Silver medal – second place	2006 Swiss championships	Sprint
Silver medal – second place	2006 Swiss championships	Mass start
Bronze medal – third place	2005 Swiss championships	Mass start

Caroline Kilchenmann (born Fribourg, August 2, 1984), is a Swiss biathlete and ski mountaineer.

Kilchenmann, member of the Sci Club Hochmatt im Fang, became a member of the national biathlon team in 2007. She studies at the University of Fribourg, and lives in La Sonnaz-Cormagens.

== Selected results ==
=== Biathlon ===
- 2001:
  - 2nd, 8th Europe Cup, relay 4 x 6 km, together with Céline Drezet, Dijana Grudiček and Leda Abati, Champex-Lac
- 2005:
  - 1st, Swiss biathlon championships, individual 15 km
  - 2nd, Swiss biathlon championships, sprint 7.5 km
  - 3rd, Swiss biathlon championships, mass start 12.5 km
- 2006:
  - 2nd, Swiss biathlon championships, sprint 7.5 km
  - 2nd, Swiss biathlon championships, mass start 12.5 km
- 2007:
  - 1st, Swiss biathlon championships, sprint 7.5 km
  - 1st, Swiss biathlon championships, pursuit 10 km

=== Skimountaineering ===
- 2011:
  - 10th, Pierra Menta, together with Valérie Berthod-Pellissier
- 2012:
  - 1st, Trophée des Gastlosen, together with Cécile Pasche
