= Tony Sbalbi =

French ski mountaineer

Personal information
- Born: 4 September 1969 (age 56) Aix-en-Provence, France

Sport
- Sport: Skiing
- Club: École militaire de haute montagne
Medal record
Men's ski mountaineering
Representing France
World Championships
Silver medal – second place	2002 France	Team
Silver medal – second place	2006 Italy	Vertical race
European Championships
Silver medal – second place	2009 Italy	Vertical race
Bronze medal – third place	2007 France	Relay

Tony Sbalbi AKA "Tony the tiger" (born 4 September 1969) is a French ski mountaineer and non-commissioned officer of the chasseurs alpins corps.

Sbalbi was born in Aix-en-Provence. He attended the Lycée Jean Raynouard in Brignoles. At the age of 18 years he joined the army, where he became instructor at the École militaire de haute montagne (EMHM) in Chamonix. In 1989 he participated in his first ski mountaineering race, and has been member of the French national team since 2002.

== Selected results ==
- 2001:
  - 6th, European Championship team race (together with Laurent Fabre)
- 2002:
  - 2nd, World Championship team race (together with Patrick Blanc)
  - 3rd, French Championship single
  - 6th, World Championship combination ranking
- 2005:
  - 4th, European Championship relay race (together with Florent Perrier, Bertrand Blanc and Grégory Gachet)
  - 8th, European Championship vertical race
- 2006:
  - 2nd, World Championship vertical race
  - 2nd, Swiss Championship vertical race
- 2007:
  - 3rd, European Championship relay race (together with Yannick Buffet, Bertrand Blanc and Fabien Anselmet)
  - 5th, European Championship vertical race
  - 9th, European Championship team race (together with Patrick Blanc)
- 2008:
  - 8th, World Championship long distance race
- 2009:
  - 2nd, European Championship vertical race
  - 5th, European Championship relay race (together with Didier Blanc, Nicolas Bonnet and Martial Premat)
- 2010:
  - 7th, World Championship team race (together with Grégory Gachet)
  - 9th, World Championship vertical race
- 2011:
  - 1st, Sellaronda Skimarathon, together with Alain Seletto

=== Patrouille des Glaciers ===
- 2000: 6th (international military teams ranking), together with Sgt chef Laurent Fabre and Adj Patrick Rassat
- 2006: 6th (and 1st "seniors II" ranking), together with Olivier Nägele and Alexander Lugger
- 2008: 6th (and 5th in the "international men" ranking), together with Alexandre Pellicier and Didier Blanc
- 2010: 7th (and 6th "ISMF men" ranking), together with Adrien Piccot and Philippe Blanc

=== Pierra Menta ===
- 1999: 9th, together with Laurent Fabre
- 2002: 6th, together with Patrick Blanc
- 2003: 1st, together with Patrick Blanc
- 2004: 6th, together with Patrick Blanc
- 2005: 8th, together with Cyril Champange
- 2006: 4th, together with Denis Trento
- 2007: 5th, together with Denis Trento
- 2008: 6th, together with Ivan Murada
- 2009: 4th, together with Didier Blanc
- 2012: 9th, together with Jean Pellissier

=== Trofeo Mezzalama ===
- 2003: 9th, together with Patrick Blanc and Cédric Tomio
- 2007: 4th, together with Martin Riz and Alain Seletto
- 2009: 3rd, together with Didier Blanc and Alain Seletto
