= 2001 European Championship of Ski Mountaineering =

Ski mountaineering event series

The 2001 European Championship of Ski mountaineering was the fourth European Championship of ski mountaineering and the first, that was organized by the International Council for Ski Mountaineering Competitions (ISMC), that was founded in 1999 as a suborganization the Union Internationale des Associations d'Alpinisme (UIAA).

The events were held in France, Italy and Spain. The team races of the "senior" and the "espoir" class were held at the French Miage-Contamines on 27 January 2001, the individual races in the Jaca, Spain, on 4 March 2001, and the team races of the "cadett" and the "junior" classes in Adamello, Italy, on 1 April 2001.

== Results ==
=== Medals ===
(alphabetic order; only "seniors" and "espoirs", without the results of "cadets" and "juniors")

country	team			individual
Andorra	1*)			
France	1	2	1	
Switzerland	1			
Slovakia			1	
Spain	2*)	1		

*) winning result of the combined Spanish-Andorran "Espoirs" women team

=== Team ===
Event held in Les Contamines, France, on 27 January 2001

List of the best 10 teams by gender:

==== Women ====
ranking	team	total time
	(Switzerland) Mabillard/Zimmerli	02h 00' 01.3"
	(France) Ducognon/Oggeri	02h 01' 35"
	(France) Zuberer/G. Pellissier	02h 03' 12"
4	(Slovakia) C. Favre/Bourillon	02h 11' 22.4"
5	(Slovakia) Paliderová/Heczková	02h 12' 07.5"
6	(Andorra) Santuré Boixadé/Rogé Tartarini	02h 12' 07.5"
7	(Switzerland) Ançay/Luyet	02h 13' 03.7"
8	(France) Lathuraz/Fourneaux	02h 13' 06.3"
9	(Spain) Gendrau Gallifa/C. Bes Ginesta	02h 15' 53.8"
10	(France) S. Tomio/Guigon	02h 17' 15.4"

==== Men ====
ranking	team	total time
	(France) Brosse/Gignoux	01h 38' 26.2"
	(France) Meilleur/C. Tomio	01h 41' 32.5"
	(Slovakia) Leitner/Svätojánsky	01h 41' 42"
4	(France) B. Blanc/Champange	01h 41' 55.8"
5	(France) Bret/Pasteur	01h 42' 24.6"
6	(France) L. Fabre/Sbalbi	0h 42' 27.4"
7	(Slovakia) Madaj/Trizna	0h 42' 29"
8	(France) E. Blanc/Prieur	0h 43' 12.7"
9	(Spain) F. Galera Díez/C. Galera Díez	0h 44' 12.9"
10	(France) Rassat/R. Gachet	0h 44' 15.1"

=== Individual ===
Event held on 4 March 2001, in Jaca, Spain

List of the best 10 participants by gender:

==== Women ====
ranking	participant	total time
	?	??h ??' ??"
	?	??h ??' ??"
	?	??h ??' ??"
4	?	??h ??' ??"
5	?	??h ??' ??"
6	?	??h ??' ??"
7	?	??h ??' ??"
8	?	??h ??' ??"
9	?	??h ??' ??"
10	?	??h ??' ??"

==== Men ====
ranking	participant	total time
	?	??h ??' ??"
	?	??h ??' ??"
	?	??h ??' ??"
4	?	??h ??' ??"
5	?	??h ??' ??"
6	?	??h ??' ??"
7	?	??h ??' ??"
8	?	??h ??' ??"
9	?	??h ??' ??"
10	?	??h ??' ??"
