= Milan Blaško =

Slovak ski mountaineer

Personal information
- Born: 21 July 1961 Kežmarok, Czechoslovakia
- Died: 26 December 2016 (aged 55)

Sport
- Sport: Skiing

Milan Blaško (21 July 1961 – 26 December 2016) was a Slovak ski mountaineer from Poprad. Together with Miroslav Leitner, Milan Madaj and Peter Svätojánsky, he finished fourth in the relay event of the 2006 World Championship of Ski Mountaineering.
