= Fabio Meraldi =

Italian ski mountaineer, mountain guide and mountain runner (born 1965)

Personal information
- Nationality: Italian
- Born: 5 August 1955 (age 70)

Sport
- Country: Italy
- Sport: Ski mountaineering Athletics
- Event: Mountain running

Fabio Meraldi (born 5 August 1965) is an Italian ski mountaineer, mountain guide and mountain runner.

Meraldi was born in Valtellina. He passed the mountain guide training at the age of 20, and participated in various mountain tours, sky running and ski mountaineering events. He collected four European titles and nine Italian titles amongst other cups and medals, won the Pierra Menta ten times (s. below) and the Sellaronda Skimarathon six times. He also holds some important world records of speed ascending to high mountains respectively ascending and descending.

== Selected results ==
=== Ski mountaineering ===
- 1995:
  - 1st, Trofeo Kima
  - 1st, Sellaronda Skimarathon (together with Enrico Pedrini)
  - 1st, Dolomiti Cup team (together with Enrico Pedrini)
- 1996:
  - 1st, Sellaronda Skimarathon (together with Enrico Pedrini)
  - 1st, Dolomiti Cup team (together with Enrico Pedrini)
- 1997:
  - 1st, Dolomiti Cup team (together with Enrico Pedrini)
  - 1st, Tour du Rutor (together with Enrico Pedrini)
  - 2nd, Trofeo Kima
- 1998:
  - 1st, Sellaronda Skimarathon (together with Enrico Pedrini)
  - 1st, Dolomiti Cup team (together with Enrico Pedrini)
  - 2nd, Trofeo Kima
- 1999:
  - 1st, Sellaronda Skimarathon (together with Enrico Pedrini)
  - 1st, Tour du Rutor (together with Enrico Pedrini)
- 2000:
  - 1st, Sellaronda Skimarathon (together with Enrico Pedrini)
  - 1st, Mountain Attack
  - 1st, Trofeo Kima
- 2001:
  - 2nd, Trofeo Kima
- 2002:
  - 1st, Sellaronda Skimarathon (together with Carlo Battel)
  - 9th, World Championship single race

==== Trofeo Mezzalama ====
- 1997: 1st, together with Enrico Pedrini and Omar Oprandi
- 1999: 2nd, together with Enrico Pedrini and Pierre Gignoux
- 2001: 2nd together with Jean Pellissier and Stéphane Brosse

==== Pierra Menta ====
- 1989: 1st, together with Adriano Greco
- 1990: 1st, together with Adriano Greco
- 1991: 1st, together with Adriano Greco
- 1992: 2nd, together with Adriano Greco
- 1993: 1st, together with Adriano Greco
- 1994: 1st, together with Adriano Greco
- 1995: 1st, together with Thierry Bochet
- 1996: 1st, together with Enrico Pedrini
- 1997: 1st, together with Enrico Pedrini
- 1998: 3rd, together with Enrico Pedrini
- 1999: 1st, together with Enrico Pedrini
- 2000: 1st, together with Enrico Pedrini

=== Skyrunning ===
- 1994: 1st, Monte Rosa SkyMarathon
- 1995: 1st, Sentiero 4 Luglio SkyMarathon
- 2000: 1st, Sentiero 4 Luglio SkyMarathon
