= Pierre Gignoux =

French ski mountaineer

Personal information
- Born: 19 May 1967 (age 59) Grenoble, France

Sport
- Sport: Skiing
Medal record
Men's ski mountaineering
Representing France
European Championships
Gold medal – first place	1999	Team
Gold medal – first place	2001 France	Team

Pierre Gignoux (born 19 May 1967) is a French ski mountaineer.

Gignoux was born in Grenoble and competed first in the Trans Mont Blanc race in 1994. Since 1995 he has been member of the French national team.

Together with Stéphane Brosse he has held the ski mountaineering record on the Mont Blanc since 30 May 2003 with a total time of 5 hours 15 minutes 47 seconds. Amongst others, he won three times the European Cup and four times the French Championships.

Gignoux enjoys also mountaineering, cross-country skiing, paragliding and street as well as mountain bicycle racing.

== Selected results ==
- 1997:
  - 2nd, French national ranking
- 1998:
  - 2nd, French national ranking
- 1999:
  - 1st, European Championship team race (together with Francis Bibollet)
  - 1st, French national ranking
- 2000:
  - 1st, French national ranking
  - 5th (and 3rd in "seniors I" class ranking), Patrouille des Glaciers (together with Francis Bibollet and Stéphane Brosse)
- 2001:
  - 1st, European Championship team race (together with Stéphane Brosse)
  - 1st, French national ranking
  - 1st, Trophée des Gastlosen (European Cup, together with Stéphane Brosse)
- 2002:
  - 1st, Tour du Rutor (together with Stéphane Brosse)
  - 5th, World Championship team race (together with Stéphane Brosse)
- 2003:
  - 1st, Dolomiti Cup team (together with Stéphan Brosse)
  - 4th, European Championship team race (together with Stéphane Brosse)
- 2004:
  - 1st, Transcavallo race (together with Stéphane Brosse)
- 2008:
  - 8th, World Championship team race (together with Alexandre Pellicier)

=== Pierra Menta ===
- 1995: 5th, together with Olivier Pasteur
- 1996: 4th, together with Francis Bibollet
- 1997: 2nd, together with Yvan Brondex
- 1998: 2nd, together with Yvan Brondex
- 1999: 2nd, together with Francis Bibollet
- 2000: 2nd, together with Francis Bibollet
- 2001: 1st, together with Stéphane Brosse
- 2002: 2nd, together with Stéphane Brosse
- 2003: 2nd, together with Stéphane Brosse

=== Trofeo Mezzalama ===
- 1999: 2nd, together with Fabio Meraldi and Enrico Pedrini
- 2003: 2nd, together with Stéphane Brosse and Jean Pellissier
