= Laëtitia Roux =

French ski mountaineer

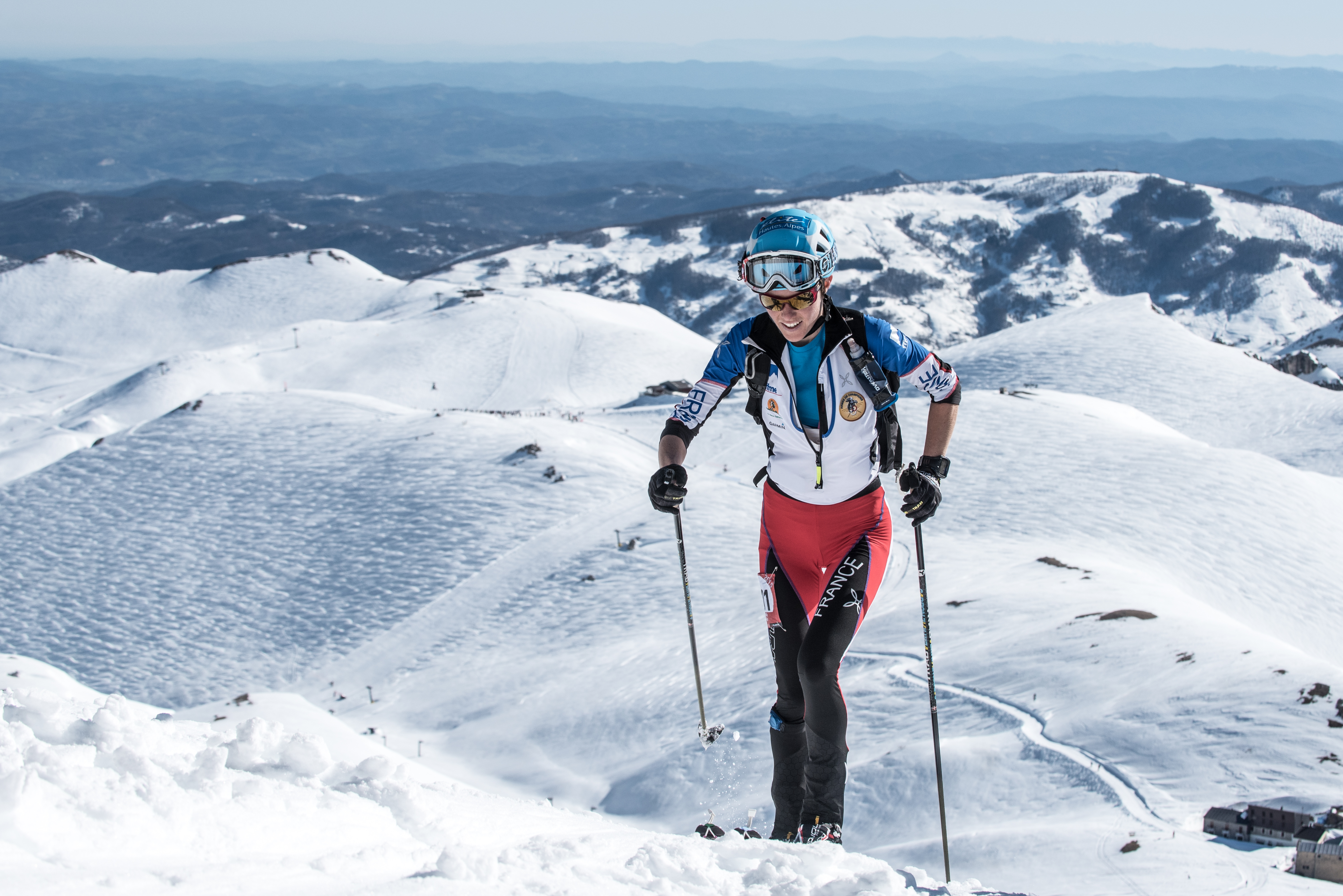

Personal information
- Born: 21 June 1985 (age 41) Savines-le-Lac, France

Sport
- Sport: Skiing
- Club: Team Ecrins Hautes-Alpes; Dynafit team
Medal record
Representing France
Ski mountaineering
World Championships
Gold medal – first place	2010 Gran Valira	Individual
Gold medal – first place	2011 Claut	Sprint
Silver medal – second place	2008 Champery	Individual
Silver medal – second place	2010 Gran Valira	Vertical race
Silver medal – second place	2011 Claut	Vertical race
Silver medal – second place	2011 Claut	Individual
Silver medal – second place	2011 Claut	Relay
European Championships
Gold medal – first place	2007 Avoriaz	Individual
Gold medal – first place	2007 Avoriaz	Vertical race
Gold medal – first place	2012 Pelvoux	Individual
Gold medal – first place	2012 Pelvoux	Vertical race
Silver medal – second place	2007 Avoriaz	Relay
Bronze medal – third place	2009 Alpago	Relay
Skyrunning
World Championships
Gold medal – first place	2010 Canazei	Vertical Km
Gold medal – first place	2010 Premana	SkyMarathon

Laëtitia Roux (born 21 June 1985) is a French ski mountaineer.

== Career ==
Roux was born in Savines-le-Lac and started ski-mountaineering at the age of nine. In autumn of 2005, she joined the PACA section of the Fédération française de la montagne et de l’escalade (FFME). She competed in December of the same year at the Alpi-Champsaur race. Roux is a member of the Team Ecrins Hautes-Alpes and the international Dynafit team. She has been a member of the French national selection since 2007 and lives in Grenoble.

== Selected results ==
- 2006:
  - 9th, World Championship vertical race
- 2007:
  - 1st, European Championship vertical race
  - 1st, European Championship single race
  - 1st, Tour du Rutor (together with Gloriana Pellissier)
  - 2nd, European Championship relay race (together with Corinne Favre and Véronique Lathuraz)
- 2008:
  - 1st, World Cup race in Massongex
  - 2nd, World Championship single race
  - 8th, European Championship vertical race
- 2009:
  - 1st, Valtellina Orobie World Cup race
  - 1st, Dachstein Xtreme
  - 3rd, European Championship relay race (together with Véronique Lathuraz and Corinne Favre)
  - 4th, European Championship vertical race
  - 7th, European Championship single race
- 2010:
  - 1st, World Championship single race
  - 2nd, World Championship vertical race
  - 4th, World Championship combination ranking
  - 5th, World Championship relay race (together with Valentine Fabre and Sandrine Favre)
- 2011:
  - 1st, World Championship sprint
  - 2nd, World Championship single race
  - 2nd, World Championship vertical race
  - 2nd, World Championship relay, together with Sandrine and Émilie Favre
  - 2nd, World Championship vertical, combined ranking
- 2012:
  - 1st, European Championship single
  - 1st, European Championship vertical race
  - 3rd, World Championship vertical, combined ranking
  - 4th, European Championship relay, together with Corinne Favre and Émilie Favre
  - 1st, Patrouille de la Maya, together with Séverine Pont-Combe and Mireia Miró Varela

=== Patrouille des Glaciers ===
- 2006: 4th, together with Marie Troillet and Laëtitia Currat
- 2008: 2nd, together with Corinne Favre and Nathalie Bourillon
- 2012: 1st, together with Mireia Miró Varela and Séverine Pont-Combe

=== Pierra Menta ===
- 2008: 1st, together with Nathalie Etzensperger
- 2009: 3rd, together with Véronique Lathuraz
- 2010: 2nd, together with Mireia Miró Varela
- 2011: 1st, together with Mireia Miró Varela
- 2012: 2nd, together with Séverine Pont-Combe
- 2017: 1st, together with Emelie Forsberg
- 2018: 2nd, together with Emelie Forsberg

=== Trofeo Mezzalama ===
- 2009: 1st, together with Francesca Martinelli and Roberta Pedranzini
- 2011: 2nd, together with Mireia Miró Varela and Nathalie Etzensperger
- 2017: 1st, together with Emelie Forsberg and Jennifer Fiechter
