= Grégory Gachet =

French ski mountaineer (born 1976)

Personal information
- Born: 9 December 1976 (age 49) Beaufort, Savoie, France

Sport
- Sport: Skiing
- Club: Club Multisports Arêches-Beaufort
Medal record
Ski mountaineering
Representing France
World Championships
Silver medal – second place	2006 World Championship	Team
Silver medal – second place	2006 World Championship	Relay
Bronze medal – third place	2008 World Championship	Vertical race
Bronze medal – third place	2010 World Championship	Relay
European Championships
Gold medal – first place	2005 European Championship	Team
Gold medal – first place	2007 European Championship	Team

Grégory Gachet (born 9 December 1976) is a French ski mountaineer.

Gachet was born in Beaufort, Savoie. He is member of the Club Multisports Arêches-Beaufort and has been member of the national selection since 2002. In 2011, he married Gabrielle Magnenat.

== Selected results ==
- 2004:
  - 7th, World Championship single race
- 2005:
  - 1st, World Cup team race in Salt Lake City (together with Florent Perrier)
  - 1st, European Championship team race (together with Florent Perrier)
  - 4th, European Championship single race
  - 4th, European Championship relay race (together with Florent Perrier, Bertrand Blanc and Tony Sbalbi)
- 2006:
  - 2nd, World Championship team race (together with Florent Perrier)
  - 2nd, World Championship relay race (together with Stéphane Brosse, Florent Perrier and Patrick Blanc)
- 2007:
  - 1st, European Championship team race (together with Florent Perrier)
  - 2nd, Tour du Rutor race
  - 4th, European Championship combination ranking
  - 6th, European Championship single race
- 2008:
  - 1st, French Championship team race
  - 3rd, World Championship vertical race
  - 3rd, World Championship combination ranking
  - 4th, World Championship team race (together with William Bon Mardion)
  - 5th, World Championship single race
- 2009:
  - 4th, European Championship team race (together with Yannick Buffet)
  - 5th, European Championship vertical race
  - 5th, European Championship combination ranking
  - 10th, European Championship single race
- 2010:
  - 3rd, World Championship relay race (together with Didier Blanc, Florent Perrier and William Bon Mardion)
  - 7th, World Championship team race (together with Tony Sbalbi)
  - 10th, World Championship vertical race

=== Pierra Menta ===
- 2001: 8th, together with Emmanuel Blanc
- 2003: 7th, together with Emmanuel Blanc
- 2005: 2nd, together with Florent Perrier
- 2007: 1st, together with Florent Perrier
- 2008: 4th, together with William Bon Mardion
- 2009: 6th, together with Alexandre Pellicier

=== Trofeo Mezzalama ===
- 2003: 7th, together with Bertrand Blanc and Cyril Champange
- 2007: 2nd, together with Florent Perrier and Patrick Blanc
- 2011: 6th, together with Xavier Gachet and Alexis Sévennec-Verdier
