= Aléxia Zuberer =

Alexia Zuberer
Personal information
- Born: 1972 (age 53–54)

Sport
- Sport: Skiing
Medal record
Women's ski mountaineering
Representing France
European Championships
Bronze medal – third place	2001 France	Team

Aléxia Zuberer (born 1972) is a Swiss-French ski mountaineer, ski instructor and mountain guide, and took also part in several Himalayan expeditions.

== Selected results ==
- 1998:
  - 1st, Tour du Rutor (together with Claudine Trécourt)
  - 2nd, Patrouille des Glaciers together with Claudine Trécourt and Jana Heczková)
- 2001:
  - 1st, Trophée des Gastlosen (European Cup, together with Gloriana Pellissier)
  - 1st, Trofeo Mezzalama (together with Gloriana Pellissier and Arianna Follis)
  - 3rd, European Championship team race (together with Gloriana Pellissier)
- 2002:
  - 1st, Transacavallo (together with Gloriana Pellissier)
  - 1st, Dolomiti Cup team (together with Gloriana Pellissier)
  - 2nd, Trophée des Gastlosen (together with Gloriana Pellissier)

=== Pierra Menta ===
- 1995: 2nd, together with Claudine Trécourt
- 1997: 1st, together with Claudine Trécourt
- 1998: 1st, together with Claudine Trécourt
- 1999: 3rd, together with Véronique Lathuraz
- 2000: 1st, together with Gloriana Pellissier
- 2001: 1st, together with Gloriana Pellissier
- 2005, 8th, together with Sylvie Ferragu

== Expeditions ==
- 1996 : Cho Oyu - Tibet (8,201 metres (26,906 ft))
- 1997 : Shishapangma - Tibet (8,013 metres (26,289 ft))
- 2002 : Ama Dablam - Nepal (6,857 metres (22,497 ft))
- 2003 : Everest - Nepal (8,850 metres (29,040 ft))
- 2007 : Everest - Tibet (8,850 metres (29,040 ft), without oxygen up to 8,500 metres (27,900 ft))
- 2008 : Mustagh Ata - China (7,545 metres (24,754 ft))
- 2010 : Makalu-Nepal (8,470 metres (27,790 ft)) with the Mountains-6 Makalu 2010 expedition, first Swiss woman to reach the summit.
- 2011 : Kangchenjunga India/Nepal (8,586 metres (28,169 ft))

== Publications ==
- Pierra Menta - Traces d'une Légende, 2005
- Double ascension à l'Everest, Nevicata Editions, 2008. ISBN 978-2-9600255-5-2.
