= Grand Pilier d'Angle =

Buttress in the Mont Blanc massif in the Aosta Valley, Italy

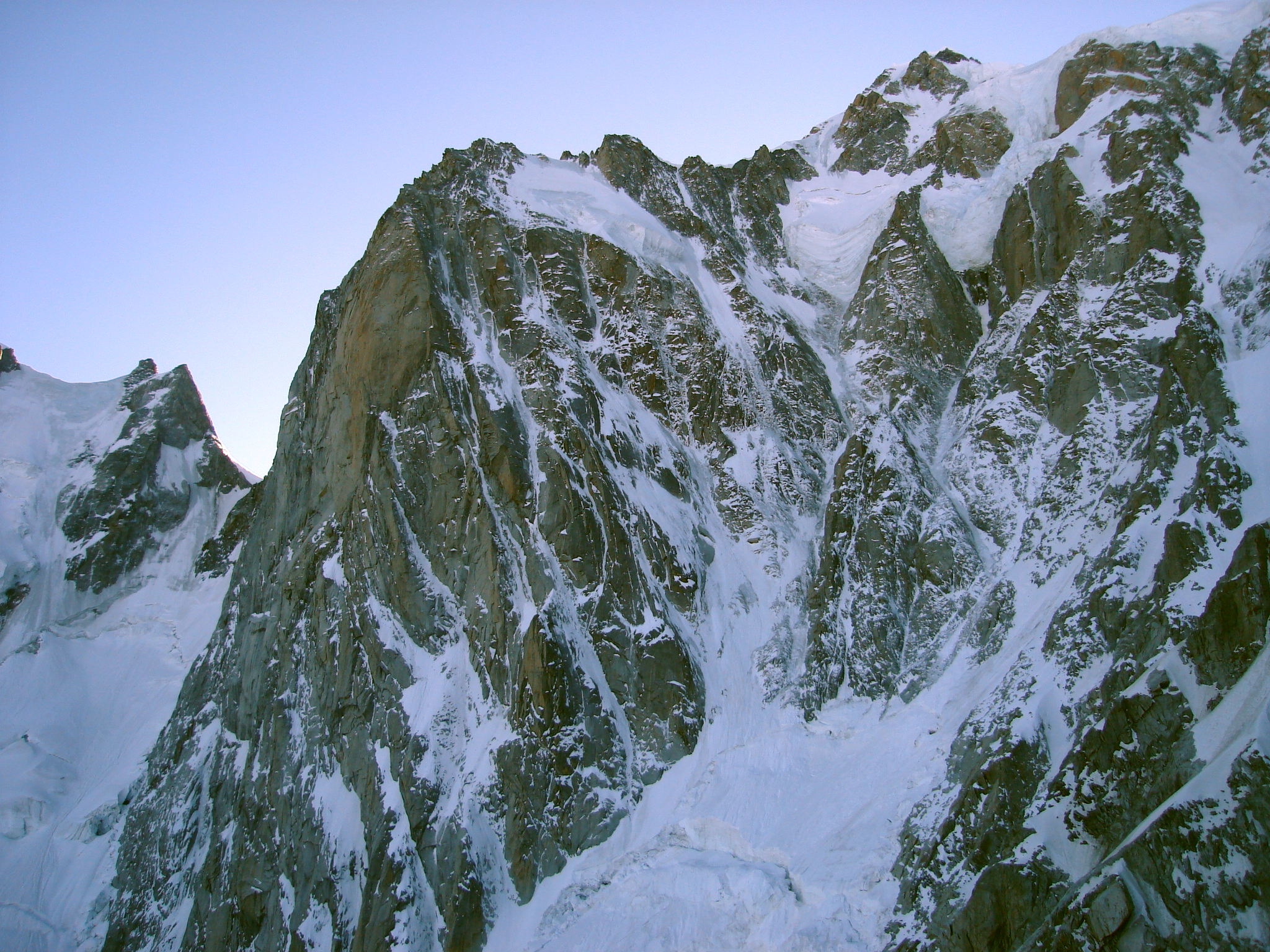
- The Grand Pilier d'Angle (centre left), with Mont Blanc to the right

Highest point
- Elevation: 4,243 m (13,921 ft)
- Prominence: 35 m ↓ col at 4,208 m
- Isolation: 0.72 km → Monte Bianco de Courmayeur
- Coordinates: 45°49′40″N 06°52′48″E

Geography
- Location within Italy
- Location: Aosta Valley, Italy
- Parent range: Mont Blanc massif

Geology
- Mountain type: Granite

Climbing
- First ascent: 20 August 1822 by F. Clissold with guides J. M. Couttet, M. Bossonney, D. Couttet, P. Favret and J. B. Simond

The Grand Pilier d'Angle (4,243 m) is a buttress on the southern side of Mont Blanc in the Mont Blanc massif in the Aosta Valley, Italy.

The first ascent from the valley was by James Eccles with guides Michel Payot and Alphonse Payot on 30 July 1877 during an ascent of the Peuterey ridge, although the summit had been visited on 20 August 1822 by F. Clissold with guides J. M. Couttet, M. Bossonney, D. Couttet, P. Favret and J. B. Simond on the descent from their first ascent of Mont Blanc de Courmayeur.

The first ascent of the pillar (the north-east face) itself was by Walter Bonatti and Toni Gobbi on 3 August 1957. Bonatti said after the climb that "the mixed terrain of the face was without doubt the most sombre, the most savage and the most dangerous of any that I have ever encountered in the Alps." The first winter ascent of the Bonatti-Gobbi route was by A. Dworak, J. Kurczab, A. Mróz and T. Piotrowski between 5 and 9 March 1971. The first solo ascent of the route was by Nicolas Jaeger on 3 August 1975.

Other well-known routes on the face include the Cecchinel-Nominé (Walter Cecchinel and Georges Nominé, 17 September 1971; the Boivin-Vallençant of 1975 adds a direct finish to this route) and Divine Providence (Patrick Gabarrou and François Marsigny, 5–7 June 1984). The first solo ascent of this route was by Jean-Christophe Lafaille in 1990, who said, "This route is the most difficult and involving in the whole of the Mont Blanc massif."

== See also ==
- List of 4000 metre peaks of the Alps
