= Miroslav Leitner =

Slovak ski mountaineer

Personal information
- Born: 1 August 1966 (age 60) Brezno, Czechoslovakia

Sport
- Sport: Skiing
- Club: Slovenská skialpinistická asociácia
Medal record
Men's ski mountaineering
Representing Slovakia
World Championships
Bronze medal – third place	2002 France	Team
European Championships
Bronze medal – third place	2001 France	Team

Miroslav Leitner (born 1 August 1966) is a Slovak ski mountaineer and has been member of the SSA national squad since 1992. Until the split of Czechoslovakia in 1993, he ran for the Czechoslovac team.

Leitner was born in Brezno. He started ski mountaineering in 1983 and competed first in the same year.

== Selected results ==
- 1998:
  - 4th, Patrouille des Glaciers ("seniors I" ranking), together with Milan Madaj and Dušan Trizna
- 2001:
  - 3rd, European Championship team race (together with Peter Svätojánsky)
- 2002:
  - 3rd, World Championship team race (together with Peter Svätojánsky)
- 2004:
  - 5th, World Championship relay race (together with Peter Svätojánsky, Branislav Kačina and Milan Madaj
  - 7th, World Championship team race (together with Peter Svätojánsky)
  - 9th, World Championship combination ranking
- 2005:
  - 5th, European Championship relay race (together with Milan Madaj, Peter Svätojánsky and Branislav Kačina)
  - 8th, European Championship team race (together with Peter Svätojánsky)
- 2006:
  - 4th, World Championship relay race (together with Peter Svätojánsky, Milan Blaško and Milan Madaj)
- 2008:
  - 5th, World Championship relay race (together with Peter Svätojánsky, Jozef Hlavco and Juraj Laštík)

=== Pierra Menta ===
- 1992: 9th, together with Tibor Novajovský
- 1993: 3rd, together with Dušan Trizna
- 1994: 10th, together with Jean-Bastipte Mang
- 1996: 5th, together with Peter Matos
- 1997: 9th, together with Peter Matos
- 1998: 9th, together with Adriano Greco
- 2000: 4th, together with Peter Svätojánsky
- 2001: 4th, together with Peter Svätojánsky
- 2002: 8th, together with Peter Svätojánsky
- 2005: 9th, together with Peter Svätojánsky

=== Trofeo Mezzalama ===
- 2003: 10th, together with Peter Svätojánsky and Milan Madaj
