= Patrick Gabarrou =

French mountaineer and mountain guide

Patrick Gabarrou a.k.a. "Le Gab" (born 19 July 1951 in Évreux), is a French mountaineer and mountain guide who is credited with more than 300 first ascents, most of them in the Mont Blanc massif.

He has been the president of the international environmental NGO Mountain Wilderness from 2006 to 2010. He is mostly an ice climber, and is considered to be a pioneer of the modern wave of ice climbing.

He also opened routes in several other regions like Canada, Bolivia and Patagonia.

== First ascents ==
=== Mountain routes ===
- Boivin-Gabarrou on the north face of Les Droites (with Jean-Marc Boivin), 1975
- Supercouloir and Gabarrou-Albinoni on Mont Blanc du Tacul
- Hypercouloir on Mont Blanc (with Pierre-Alain Steiner), 1982
- Divine Providence on the Grand Pilier d'Angle, 1984
- Gabarrou-Silvy on the Aiguille Sans Nom, 1985
- Directissime on the Grandes Jorasses (with Hervé Bouvard), 1986
- Aux amis disparus on the Matterhorn (with Lionel Daudet)
- Directissime de la Margerita on Monte Rosa (with Christian Appertet), 1992
- Alexis on Point Whymper of the Grandes Jorasses (with Benoît Robert), 1993
- A Leï on the Grandes Jorasses (with Philippe Batoux and Benoît Robert), February 2003
- Heidi on the Grandes Jorasses (with Philippe Batoux and Christophe Dumarest), 17–21 March 2005
- Ciao Walter on Mont-Blanc (with Simon Deniel and Ben O'Connor-Croft), 2012
- Brigite on the Arête des Grands Montets (with his wife Franca et Philippe Lansard), 5 April 2013
- René Croft between the Boivin-Gabarrou and the Barnoud-Marsigny on the north face of Les Droites (with Ben O'Connor-Croft), 25–26 April 2013
- Padre Pio, Une Echelle Vers le Ciel on the south face of Matterhorn, 2015 (see Alpinist article)

=== Ice climbs ===
- Cascade Notre Dame, 700 m, V, WI6 (with François Marsigny), 1984
- Freneysie Pascale, 1984
- Abominette, 700 m, IV, 5.8, WI3 (with Christophe Profit and Sylviane Tavernier), 1984
- Fantomastic, 700 m, V, WI6 (with François Marsigny), 1985
- Patagonic, 700 m, M6, V+, WI6, A1 (with Christophe Dumarest), 2003

=== Skiing ===
- First descent of the north face of the Col de Peuterey, with Jean-Marc Boivin, 1977
- Winner, French championship of ski-mountaineering 1989, together with Pierre d'Alboy
- Sixth place, Pierra Menta 1989, together with Pierre d'Alboy
- Fourth, Pierra Menta 1991, together with Lionel Mailly
- First descent of the south face of the Tour Noir, with Ben O’Connor-Croft, 16 April 2013
