= Corinne Favre =

French ski instructor, ski mountaineer, and mountain runner

Personal information
- Born: 15 December 1970 (age 55)

Sport
- Country: France
- Sport: Ski mountaineering Skyrunning

Achievements and titles
- World finals: 2 Skyrunning World Cup: Overall; 2005; 2008
Medal record
Women's ski mountaineering
Representing France
World Championships
Silver medal – second place	2002 World Championship	Team
Bronze medal – third place	2006 Cuneo	Team
Bronze medal – third place	2006 Cuneo	Relay
Bronze medal – third place	2008 Portes du Soleil	Relay
European Championships
Silver medal – second place	2007 Avoriaz	Team
Silver medal – second place	2007 Avoriaz	Relay
Bronze medal – third place	2003 Tatra Mountains	Team
Bronze medal – third place	2009 Alpago	Relay
Women's skyrunning
European Championships
Gold medal – first place	2008 Zegama	SkyRace
Bronze medal – third place	2011 Valencia	Vertical Kilometer

Corinne Favre (born 15 December 1970) is a French professional ski instructor, competitive ski mountaineer, and champion mountain runner.

== Biography ==
In November 2008 she and an accompanying Sherpa suffered a serious accident while descending from the Pumori mountain during an expedition in Nepal. After convalescing, she returned to action in the Championnat de France Vertical Race in January 2009.

== Selected results ==
=== Ski mountaineering ===
- 1998:
  - 3rd, Trofeo Kima
- 1999:
  - 1st, Tour du Rutor (together with Gloriana Pellissier)
  - 3rd, French national ranking
- 2001:
  - 3rd, French national ranking
  - 4th, European Championship (team race together with Nathalie Bourillon)
- 2002:
  - 1st, Trofeo Kima
  - 1st, Tour du Rutor (together with Carole Toïgo)
  - 2nd, World Championship (team race)
  - 4th, World Championship combined ranking
  - 5th, World Championship single race
- 2003:
  - 3rd, European Championship (team race together with Véronique Lathuraz)
  - 5th, European Championship (single race)
  - 5th, European Championship (combined ranking)
- 2004:
  - 1st, Trofeo Kima
  - 7th, World Championship (combined ranking)
  - 10th, World Championship single race
- 2006:
  - 1st, Trofeo Kima
  - 3rd, World Championship team race (together with Carole Toïgo)
  - 3rd, World Championship relay race (together with Carole Toïgo, Véronique Lathuraz and Nathalie Bourillon)
  - 5th, World Championship vertical race
- 2007:
  - 1st, Trofeo Kima
  - 2nd, European Championship team race (together with Véronique Lathuraz)
  - 2nd, European Championship relay race (together with Véronique Lathuraz and Laëtitia Roux)
  - 7th, European Championship vertical race
- 2008:
  - 3rd, World Championship relay race (together with Nathalie Bourillon, Véronique Lathuraz and Valentine Fabre)
  - 4th, World Championship team race (together with Nathalie Bourillon)
  - 5th, World Championship vertical race
  - 10th, World Championship combined ranking
- 2009:
  - 3rd, European Championship relay race (together with Véronique Lathuraz and Laëtitia Roux)
- 2012:
  - 4th, European Championship relay, together with Émilie Favre and Laëtitia Roux
  - 7th, European Championship vertical race

==== Pierra Menta ====
- 1997: 4th, together with Nathalie Bourillon
- 1998: 3rd, together with Jana Heczková
- 1999: 2nd, together with Gloriana Pellissier
- 2001: 2nd, together with Carole Toïgo
- 2003: 3rd, together with Carole Toïgo
- 2004: 2nd, together with Carole Toïgo
- 2005: 3rd, together with Carole Toïgo
- 2006: 4th, together with Carole Toïgo
- 2007: 2nd, together with Nathalie Bourillon
- 2008: 4th, together with Véronique Lathuraz
- 2009: 5th, together with Magali Jacquemoud

==== Patrouille des Glaciers ====
- 1998: 3rd, together with Danielle Hacquard and Véronique Lathuraz
- 2006: 2nd (together with Véronique Lathuraz and Nathalie Bourillon)
- 2008: 2nd (together with Laëtitia Roux and Nathalie Bourillon)

==== Trofeo Mezzalama ====
- 2007: 2nd, together with Véronique Lathuraz and Nathalie Bourillon
- 2011: 4th, together with Gabrielle Magnenat and Émilie Gex-Fabry

=== Sky running ===
Favre won the Sentiero 4 Luglio SkyMarathon in 2002, 2003, 2007 and 2008. In 2005, she won the Pikes Peak Marathon at her first attempt, and also won the Buff Skyrunner World Series the same year after winning five of the six races in which she competed. She had previously finished second in 2003 despite winning three races, more than any other competitor, and seventh overall in 2004 after placing first and second in the only two races in which she took part. She won her second Skyrunner Series title in 2008, and is also a three-time winner of the race from Base Camp to Lukla on Mount Everest.
