= Gretel Oberhollenzer-Rogger =

Gretel "Greti" Oberhollenzer-Rogger, née Rogger (born 1958), is an Italian ski mountaineer. She and her husband are dairymen of the Rifugio Pian di Cengia a.k.a. Büllelejochhütte near Sexten.

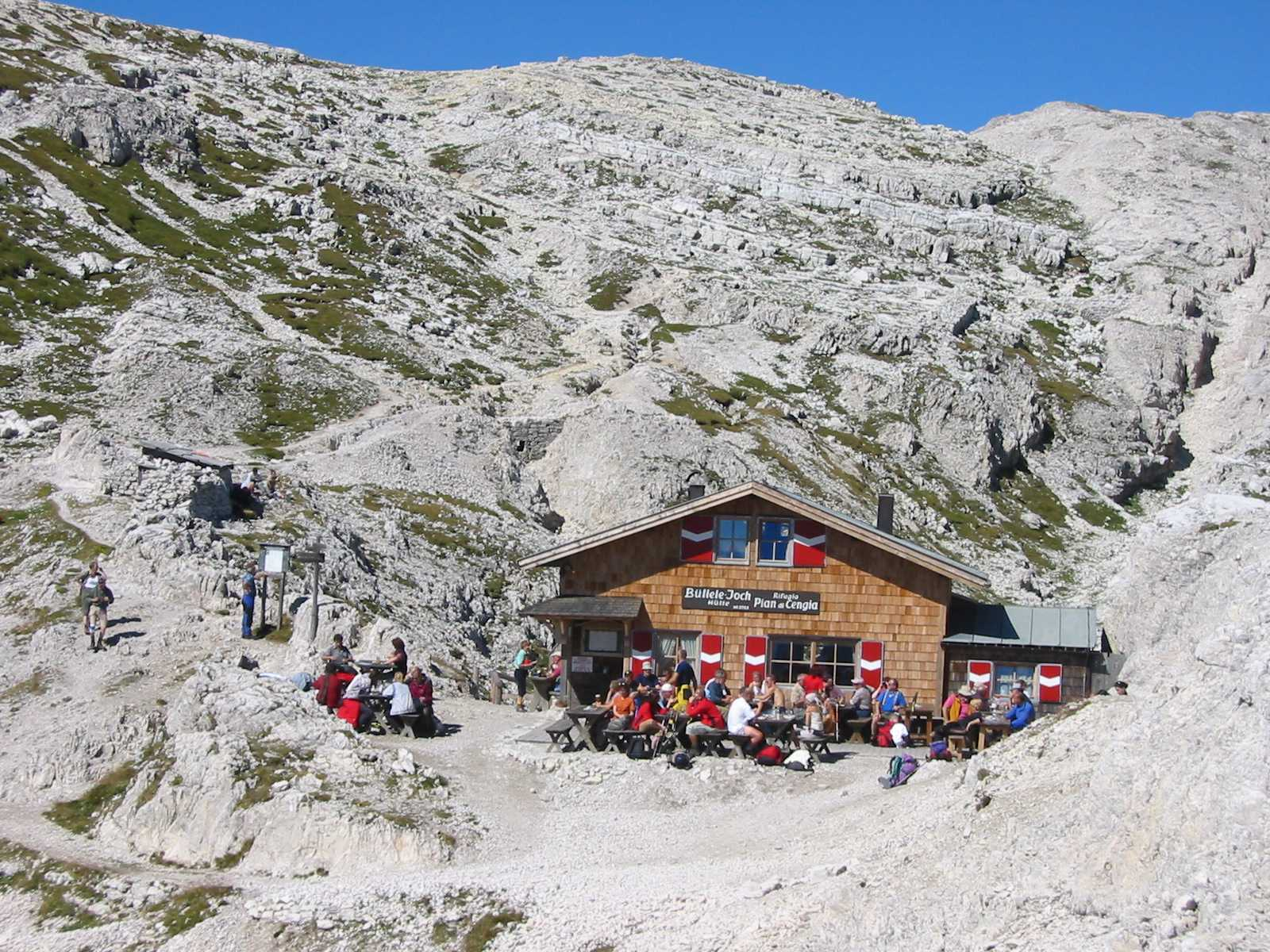
Rifugio Pian di Cengia, entertained by the Roggers

== Selected results ==
- 2003:
  - 4th, Pierra Menta (together with Astrid Renzler)
- 2004:
  - 1st, Dolomiti Cup team (together with Astrid Renzler)
  - 2nd, World Cup team (together with Astrid Renzler)
  - 7th, World Championship team race (together with Astrid Renzler)
