= Ivan Murada =

Italian ski mountaineer (born 1965)

Personal information
- Born: 4 April 1965 (age 61)

Sport
- Sport: Skiing
Medal record
Men's ski mountaineering
Representing Italy
World Championships
Gold medal – first place	2002 France	Team
European Championships
Silver medal – second place	2005 Andorra	Team

Ivan Murada (born 4 April 1965) is an Italian ski mountaineer.

== Personal life ==
Murada's daughter, Giulia, is also a ski mountaineer.

== Selected results ==
- 1997:
  - 1st, Trofeo "Rinaldo Maffeis" (together with Graziano Boscacci)
- 1998:
  - 3rd, Sellaronda Skimarathon (together with Ivan Murada)
- 1999:
  - 1st, Trofeo "Rinaldo Maffeis" (together with Graziano Boscacci)
  - 2nd, Sellaronda Skimarathon (together with Ivan Murada)
- 2000:
  - 7th (and 2nd in "seniors II" ranking), Patrouille des Glaciers, together with Graziano Boscacci and Camillo Vescovo
- 2001:
  - 1st, Sellaronda Skimarathon (together with Graziano Boscacci)
  - 1st, Tour du Rutor (together with Graziano Boscacci)
- 2002:
  - 1st, World Championship team race (together with Graziano Boscacci)
  - 3rd, World Championship combination ranking
  - 3rd, Sellaronda Skimarathon (together with Ivan Murada)
  - 4th, World Championship single race
- 2005:
  - 2nd, European Championship team race (together with Graziano Boscacci)
- 2006:
  - 3rd, Adamello Ski Raid (together with Graziano Boscacci and Daniele Pedrini)
- 2007:
  - 1st, Trofeo "Rinaldo Maffeis" (together with Guido Giacomelli)
  - 3rd, Sellaronda Skimarathon (together with Ivan Murada)
- 2008:
  - 2nd, Sellaronda Skimarathon (together with Ivan Murada)
  - 7th, World Championship team race (together with Lorenzo Holzknecht)
- 2012:
  - Received oral

=== Pierra Menta ===
- 1995: 9th, together with Graziano Boscacci
- 1998: 6th, together with Graziano Boscacci
- 1999: 4th, together with Graziano Boscacci
- 2000: 5th, together with Graziano Boscacci
- 2001: 2nd, together with Graziano Boscacci
- 2002: 1st, together with Graziano Boscacci
- 2003: 5th, together with Graziano Boscacci
- 2004: 5th, together with Graziano Boscacci
- 2005: 4th, together with Graziano Boscacci
- 2006: 7th, together with Graziano Boscacci
- 2007: 8th, together with Daniele Pedrini
- 2008: 6th, together with Tony Sbalbi

=== Trofeo Mezzalama ===
- 1999: 3rd, together with Graziano Boscacci and Luca Negroni
- 2001: 1st, together with Graziano Boscacci and Heinz Blatter
- 2003: 5th, together with Graziano Boscacci and Heinz Blatter
- 2007: 5th, together with Graziano Boscacci and Mirco Mezzanotte
- 2009: 4th, together with Graziano Boscacci and Pietro Lanfranchi
