= French Federation of Mountaineering and Climbing =

French climbing sports federation

The French Federation of Mountaineering and Climbing (French: Fédération Française de la Montagne et de l’Escalade, FFME), located in Paris, is the French federation of mountain and climbing sports, especially of non-motorized alpine sports like mountaineering, canyoning, climbing, mountain touring and hiking, snowshoe hiking and ski mountaineering. The FFME is member of the French National Olympic and Sports Committee. The foundation of the FFME in 1987 was the result of the fusion of the French Federation of Mountaineering (French: Fédération Française de la Montagne, FFM), founded in 1942 by the high commissariat of sports (French: Haut Commissariat aux Sports) in addition to the existing Club Alpin Français (CAF), and the climbing association French Federation of Climbing (French: Fédération Française d’Escalade, FFE), which was founded in 1985. A further fusion of the FFME and the CAF in the beginning 2000s failed.

In 2002, the FFME supported the first ISMC UIAA World Championship of Ski Mountaineering in France.
