= Gloriana Pellissier =

Italian ski mountaineer and mountain runner

Personal information
- Born: 12 August 1976 (age 50) Aosta, Italy

Sport
- Sport: Skiing
- Club: G.S. Esercito
Medal record
Women's ski mountaineering
Representing Italy
World Championships
Gold medal – first place	2006 Italy	Relay
Silver medal – second place	2002 France	Team
Silver medal – second place	2004 Spain	Single
Silver medal – second place	2008 Switzerland	Relay
Bronze medal – third place	2004 Spain	Vertical race
Bronze medal – third place	2004 Spain	Relay
European Championships
Gold medal – first place	2007 France	Relay
Gold medal – first place	2009 Italy	Relay
Silver medal – second place	2005 Andorra	Single
Silver medal – second place	2005 Andorra	Vertical race
Silver medal – second place	2005 Andorra	Relay
Bronze medal – third place	2001 France	Team
Bronze medal – third place	2007 France	Single
Bronze medal – third place	2007 France	Vertical race
Bronze medal – third place	2009 Italy	Single
Bronze medal – third place	2012 France	Relay
World Military Games
Silver medal – second place	2017 Sochi	Individual

Gloriana Pellissier (born 12 August 1976) is an Italian ski mountaineer and mountain runner.

== Biography ==
Pellissier was born in Aosta. She started ski mountaineering in 1995 and competed first in the Tour du Rutor race in 1996. She has been member of the national team since 1999. Pellissier is married with two children.

== Selected results (ski mountaineering) ==
=== Ski mountaineering ===
Pellissier was Italian Champion in a row from 1997 to 2001 and from 2004 to 2005.

- 1996:
  - 1st, Tour du Rutor (together with Persida Favre)
- 1997:
  - 1st, Tour du Rutor (together with Persida Favre)
- 1998:
  - 1st, Dolomiti Cup single
  - 1st, Lagorai – Cima d’Asta – Memorial „Egidio Battisti – Lino Vesco
  - 2nd, Trofeo Kima
- 1999:
  - 1st, Tour du Rutor (together with Corinne Favre)
  - 3rd, Trofeo Kima
- 2000:
  - 1st, French national ranking
  - 1st, Trofeo Kima
  - 1st, Tour du Rutor (together with Arianna Follis)
- 2001:
  - 1st, Trophée des Gastlosen (European Cup, together with Aléxia Zuberer)
  - 1st, Italian Cup
  - 3rd, European Championship team race (together with Aléxia Zuberer)
- 2002:
  - 1st, Italian Cup
  - 1st, Dolomiti Cup team (together with Aléxia Zuberer)
  - 1st, Lagorai – Cima d’Asta – Memorial „Egidio Battisti – Lino Vesco
  - 1st, Transacavallo (together with Alexia Zubérer)
  - 2nd, World Championship single race
  - 2nd, Trofeo Kima
  - 2nd, Trophée des Gastlosen (together with Aléxia Zuberer)
  - 3rd, World Championship combination ranking
  - 4th, World Championship team race (together with Chiara Raso)
- 2004:
  - 1st, Tour du Rutor (together with Christiane Nex)
  - 2nd, World Championship single race
  - 3rd, World Championship vertical race
  - 3rd, World Championship relay race (together with Annamaria Baudena and Christiane Nex)
- 2005:
  - 2nd, European Championship single race
  - 2nd, European Championship vertical race
  - 2nd, European Championship relay race (together with Francesca Martinelli and Christiane Nex)
  - 6th, European Championship team race (together with Christiane Nex)
- 2006:
  - 1st, World Championship relay race (together with Francesca Martinelli, Chiara Raso and Roberta Pedranzini)
  - 1st, Dolomiti Cup single
  - 1st, Tour du Rutor (together with Gabrielle Magnenat)
  - 4th, World Championship vertical race
- 2007:
  - 1st, European Championship relay race (together with Francesca Martinelli and Roberta Pedranzini)
  - 1st, Tour du Rutor (together with Laëtitia Roux)
  - 3rd, European Championship single race
  - 3rd, European Championship vertical race
- 2008:
  - 2nd, World Championship relay race (together with Roberta Pedranzini, Francesca Martinelli and Elisa Fleischmann)
  - 5th, World Championship single race
  - 5th, World Cup race single
  - 10th, World Championship vertical race
- 2009:
  - 1st, European Championship relay race (together with Roberta Pedranzini and Francesca Martinelli)
  - 8th, European Championship single race
  - 8th, European Championship vertical race
- 2011:
  - 1st, Tour du Rutor (together with Mireia Miró Varela)
- 2012:
  - 3rd, European Championship relay, together with Elena Nicolini and Martina Valmassoi
  - 6th, European Championship vertical race

==== Trofeo Mezzalama ====
- 1999: 1st, together with Danielle Hacquard and Véronique Lathuraz
- 2001: 1st, together with Arianna Follis and Aléxia Zuberer
- 2005: 1st, together with Christiane Nex and Natascia Leonardi Cortesi
- 2007: 1st, together with Francesca Martinelli and Roberta Pedranzini
- 2011: 1st, together with Francesca Martinelli and Roberta Pedranzini

==== Pierra Menta ====
- 1998: 4th, together with Corinne Roux Mollard
- 1999: 2nd, together with Corinne Favre
- 2000: 1st, together with Aléxia Zuberer
- 2001: 1st, together with Aléxia Zuberer
- 2009: 4th, together with Corinne Clos

=== Sky running ===
Pellisier won the Mezzalama Skyrace from 2000 to 2002, and from 2004 to 2008. She won the Sentiero 4 Luglio SkyMarathon in 1999, 2000, 2006 and 2008, and the half marathon of the event in 2004 and 2007.
