= Graziano Boscacci =

Italian ski mountaineer

Personal information
- Born: 15 November 1969 (age 56) Albosaggia, Italy

Sport
- Sport: Skiing
Medal record
Men's ski mountaineering
Representing Italy
World Championships
Gold medal – first place	2002 France	Team
Silver medal – second place	2004 Spain	Relay
European Championships
Silver medal – second place	2005 Andorra	Team

Graziano Boscacci (born 15 November 1969 in Albosaggia) is an Italian ski mountaineer. His son Michele is also competing in ski mountaineering.

== Selected results ==
- 1997:
  - 1st, Trofeo "Rinaldo Maffeis" (together with Ivan Murada)
- 1998:
  - 3rd, Sellaronda Skimarathon (together with Ivan Murada)
- 1999:
  - 1st, Trofeo "Rinaldo Maffeis" (together with Ivan Murada)
  - 2nd, Sellaronda Skimarathon (together with Ivan Murada)
- 2000:
  - 7th (and 2nd in "seniors II" ranking), Patrouille des Glaciers ("seniors II" ranking), together with Ivan Murada and Camillo Vescovo
- 2001:
  - 1st, Sellaronda Skimarathon (together with Ivan Murada)
  - 1st, Tour du Rutor (together with Ivan Murada)
- 2002:
  - 1st, World Championship team race (together with Ivan Murada)
  - 3rd, Sellaronda Skimarathon (together with Ivan Murada)
  - 4th, World Championship combination ranking
- 2003:
  - 2nd, Sellaronda Skimarathon (together with Claudio Ruffalini)
  - 7th, European Championship single race
- 2004:
  - 2nd, World Championship relay race (together with Carlo Battel, Martin Riz and Guido Giacomelli)
- 2005:
  - 2nd, European Championship team race (together with Ivan Murada)
- 2006:
  - 3rd, Adamello Ski Raid (together with Guido Giacomelli and Daniele Pedrini)
- 2007:
  - 3rd, Sellaronda Skimarathon (together with Ivan Murada)
- 2008:
  - 1st, Italian Cup
  - 2nd, Sellaronda Skimarathon (together with Ivan Murada)
- 2011:
  - 2nd, Sellaronda Skimarathon (together with Daniele Pedrini)

=== Pierra Menta ===
- 1995: 9th, together with Ivan Murada
- 1998: 6th, together with Ivan Murada
- 1999: 4th, together with Ivan Murada
- 2000: 5th, together with Ivan Murada
- 2001: 2nd, together with Ivan Murada
- 2002: 1st, together with Ivan Murada
- 2003: 5th, together with Ivan Murada
- 2004: 5th, together with Ivan Murada
- 2005: 4th, together with Ivan Murada
- 2006: 7th, together with Ivan Murada

=== Trofeo Mezzalama ===
- 1999: 3rd, together with Ivan Murada and Luca Negroni
- 2001: 1st, together with Ivan Murada and Heinz Blatter
- 2003: 5th, together with Ivan Murada and Heinz Blatter
- 2007: 5th, together with Ivan Murada and Mirco Mezzanotte
- 2009: 4th, together with Ivan Murada and Pietro Lanfranchi
