= Patrice Bret (ski mountaineer) =

French ski mountaineer

Patrice Bret (born 1971) is a French ski mountaineer. He was born in Lyon.

== Selected results ==
- 1997:
  - 5th, French Championship
  - 5th, French Cup
- 1998:
  - 2nd, French Championship
  - 3rd, French Cup
  - 4th, European Cup
- 1999 :
  - 1st, French Championship team (together with Stéphane Brosse)
  - 6th, European Championship team race (together with Stéphane Brosse)
- 2000:
  - 1st, European Cup team (together with Stéphane Brosse)
- 2001:
  - 1st, Croix de Chamrousse
  - 3rd, European Cup
  - 5th, European Championship team race (together with Olivier Pasteur)

=== Pierra Menta ===
- 1997: 10th, together with Stéphane Brosse
- 1998: 7th, together with Stéphane Brosse
- 1999: 3rd, together with Stéphane Brosse
- 2000: 3rd, together with Stéphane Brosse
