= Jean Pellissier (ski mountaineer) =

Italian ski mountaineer (1972–2023)

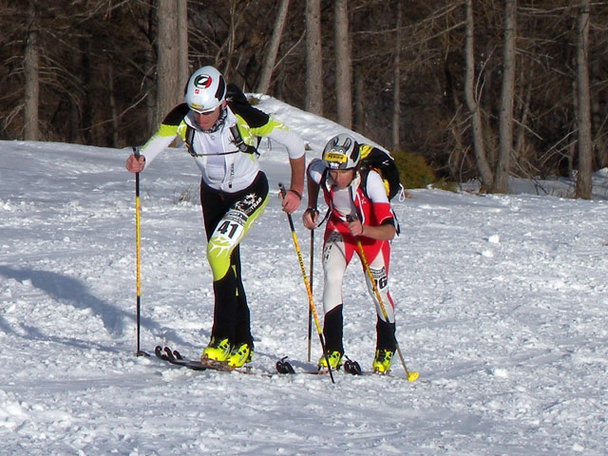
- Pellissier (right) during a race of ski mountaineering

Personal information
- Nationality: Italian
- Born: 30 July 1972 Aosta, Italy
- Died: 27 October 2023 (aged 51) Saint-Vincent, Italy

Sport
- Country: Italy
- Sport: Ski mountaineering Athletics
- Event(s): Mountain running Skyrunning
Medal record
Ski mountaineering
World Championship
Silver medal – second place	2004 Val d'Aran	Team
European Championship
Bronze medal – third place	2007 Morzine	Team

Jean Pellissier (30 July 1972 – 27 October 2023) was an Italian ski mountaineer, mountain runner, and sky runner.

== Career ==
Pellissier started ski mountaineering in 1997 and competed first in the Mezzalama Trophy race in the same year. He has been member of the national team since 2002. Since finishing his professional career he ran a mountain equipment store in Martigny.

== Death ==
Jean Pellissier died on 27 October 2023, at the age of 51.

== Selected results ==
- 2003:
  - 1st, Sellaronda Skimarathon (together with Luca Negroni)
  - 1st, Trofeo "Rinaldo Maffeis" (together with Luca Negroni)
  - 9th, European Championship team race (together with Carlo Battel)
- 2004:
  - 2nd, World Championship team race (together with Carlo Battel)
  - 4th, World Championship vertical race
  - 5th, World Championship combination ranking
  - 10th, World Championship single race
- 2005:
  - 5th, European Championship team race (together with Carlo Battel)
- 2006:
  - 6th, World Championship team race (together with Carlo Battel)
- 2007:
  - 3rd, European Championship team race (together with Guido Giacomelli)

=== Pierra Menta ===
- 2000: 7th, together with Vincent Meilleur
- 2002: 7th, together with Olivier Nägele
- 2005: 3rd, together with Guido Giacomelli
- 2007: 7th, together with Martin Riz
- 2012: 9th, together with Tony Sbalbi

=== Trofeo Mezzalama ===
- 1999: 6th, together with Giuseppe Ouvrier and Ettore Champrétavy
- 2001: 2nd, together with Fabio Meraldi and Stéphane Brosse
- 2003: 2nd, together with Stéphane Brosse and Pierre Gignoux
- 2005: 3rd, together with Manfred Reichegger and Dennis Brunod
- 2007: 1st, together with Guido Giacomelli and Florent Troillet
- 2009: 2nd, together with Damiano Lenzi and Daniele Pedrini
- 2011: 7th, together with Guido Giacomelli and Lorenzo Holzknecht

=== Patrouille des Glaciers ===
- 2000: 8th (and 3rd in "seniors II" ranking), Patrouille des Glaciers, together with Giuseppe Ouvrier and Ettore Champrétavy
- 2004: 1st and course record, together with Patrick Blanc and Stéphane Brosse
