= Carole Toïgo =

French ski mountaineer (born 1971)

Personal information
- Born: 4 August 1971 (age 55)

Sport
- Sport: Skiing
Medal record
Women's ski mountaineering
Representing France
World Championships
Silver medal – second place	2002 France	Team
Silver medal – second place	2006 Italy	Team
Bronze medal – third place	2004 Spain	Team
Bronze medal – third place	2006 Italy	Relay

Carole Toïgo (born 4 August 1971) is a French ski mountaineer.

== Selected results ==
- 2002:
  - 1st, Tour du Rutor (together with Corinne Favre)
  - 2nd, World Championship team race (together with Corinne Favre)
  - 3rd, French Championship single
  - 6th, World Championship combination ranking
  - 7th, World Championship single race
- 2003:
  - 10th, European Championship single race
- 2004:
  - 3rd, World Championship team race (together with Corinne Favre)
- 2006:
  - 2nd, World Championship team race (together with Corinne Favre)
  - 3rd, World Championship relay race (together with Véronique Lathuraz, Corinne Favre and Nathalie Bourillon)

=== Pierra Menta ===
- 2000: 4th, together with Laurence Darragon
- 2001: 2nd, together with Corinne Favre
- 2003: 3rd, together with Corinne Favre
- 2004: 2nd, together with Corinne Favre
- 2005: 3rd, together with Corinne Favre
- 2006: 4th, together with Corinne Favre
