= Jean-Marc Joguet =

French ski mountaineer and long-distance runner (born 1965)

Personal information
- Born: March 29, 1965 (age 61)

Sport
- Sport: Skiing
Medal record
Representing France

Jean-Marc Joguet (born 29 March 1965) from Beaufort, Savoie is a French ski mountaineer and long-distance runner.

== Selected results ==
=== Pierra Menta (ski mountaineering) ===
- 1986: 1st, together with Pascal Fagnola
- 1987: 2nd, together with Thierry Bochet
- 1988, 5th, together with Pierre Viard Gaudin
- 1995, 10th, together with René Gachet
- 1996, 10th, together with René Gachet

=== Running ===
- 2006, 2nd, Tour du Beaufortain
