= Milan Madaj =

Slovak ski mountaineer

Personal information
- Born: 8 May 1970 (age 56) Liptovský Mikuláš, Czechoslovakia

Sport
- Sport: Skiing
- Club: SK James Bobrovec; Slovenská skialpinistická asociácia

Milan Madaj (born 8 May 1970) of the SK James Bobrovec is a Slovak ski mountaineer. He became a member of the SSA national squad in 1992.

Madaj was born in Liptovský Mikuláš. He started ski mountaineering in 1989 and competed first in 1991.

== Selected results ==
- 1998:
  - 4th, Patrouille des Glaciers (together with Miroslav Leitner and Dušan Trizna)
- 2000:
  - 1st: Psotkov memoriál
- 2001:
  - 7th, European Championship team race (together with Dušan Trizna)
- 2002:
  - 10th, World Championship team race (together with Dušan Trizna)
- 2004:
  - 5th, World Championship relay race (together with Miroslav Leitner, Branislav Kačina and Peter Svätojánsky
- 2005:
  - 5th, European Championship relay race (together with Peter Svätojánsky, Miroslav Leitner und Branislav Kačina)
- 2006:
  - 4th, World Championship relay race (together with Miroslav Leitner, Milan Blaško and Peter Svätojánsky)
- 2007:
  - 10th, European Championship relay race (together with Matúš Daňko, Jozef Hlavco and Juraj Laštík)

=== Pierra Menta ===
- 1994: 2nd, together with Dušan Trizna
- 1995: 2nd, together with Dušan Trizna
- 1996: 3rd, together with Dušan Trizna ("seniors I" ranking)
- 1998: 8th, together with Dušan Trizna
- 2000: 6th, together with Dušan Trizna
- 2001: 9th, together with Dušan Trizna
- 2006: 9th, together with Peter Svätojánsky

=== Trofeo Mezzalama ===
- 2003: 10th, together with Peter Svätojánsky and Miroslav Leitner
