= Nathalie Bourillon =

French ski mountaineer

Personal information
- Born: 28 May 1965 (age 61)

Sport
- Sport: Skiing
Medal record
Women's ski mountaineering
Representing France
World Championships
Silver medal – second place	2004 Spain	Relay
Bronze medal – third place	2002 France	Team
Bronze medal – third place	2006 Italy	Relay
Bronze medal – third place	2008 Switzerland	Relay

Nathalie Bourillon (born 28 May 1965) is a French ski mountaineer.

== Selected results ==
- 2001:
  - 4th, European Championship team race (together with Corinne Favre)
- 2002:
  - 2nd, French Championship single
  - 3rd, World Championship team race (together with Véronique Lathuraz)
  - 8th, World Championship combination ranking
- 2003:
  - 9th, European Championship single race
- 2004
  - 2nd, World Championship relay race (together with Véronique Lathuraz and Delphine Oggeri)
  - 5th, World Championship team race (together with Véronique Lathuraz)
  - 5th, World Championship combination ranking
  - 6th, World Championship single race
- 2005:
  - 1st, Tour du Rutor (together with Véronique Lathuraz)
  - 4th, European Championship relay race (together with Véronique Lathuraz and Valentine Fabre)
  - 7th, European Championship vertical race
  - 8th, European Championship team race (together with Véronique Lathuraz)
- 2006:
  - 3rd, World Championship relay race (together with Carole Toïgo, Véronique Lathuraz and Corinne Favre)
  - 5th, World Championship team race (together with Véronique Lathuraz)
- 2007:
  - 2nd, Trofeo Mezzalama (together with Véronique Lathuraz and Corinne Favre)
- 2008:
  - 3rd, World Championship relay race (together with Corinne Favre, Véronique Lathuraz and Valentine Fabre)
  - 4th, World Championship team race (together with Corinne Favre)
  - 5th, World Championship long distance race

=== Pierra Menta ===
- 1997: 4th, together with Corinne Favre
- 2000: 3rd, together with Nathalie Blanc
- 2002: 3rd, together with Véronique Lathuraz
- 2005: 2nd, together with Véronique Lathuraz
- 2007: 2nd, together with Corinne Favre

=== Patrouille des Glaciers ===
- 2006: 2nd, together with Véronique Lathuraz and Corinne Favre
- 2008: 2nd, together with Laëtitia Roux and Corinne Favre
