= Dušan Trizna =

Personal information
- Born: October 1, 1967 (age 58)

Sport
- Sport: Skiing
- Club: Slovenská skialpinistická asociácia
Medal record
Representing Czechoslovakia
(– 1992)
Representing Slovakia
(1993 –)

Dušan Trizna (born October 1, 1967) is a Slovak ski mountaineer and was member of the SSA national squad. Until the split of Czechoslovakia in 1993, he competed for the Czechoslovak team.

== Selected results ==
- 1998:
  - 4th, Patrouille des Glaciers ("seniors I" ranking), together with Milan Madaj and Miroslav Leitner
- 2001:
  - 7th, European Championship team race (together with Milan Madaj)
- 2002:
  - 10th World Championship team race (together with Milan Madaj)

=== Pierra Menta ===
- 1993: 3rd, together with Miroslav Leitner
- 1994: 2nd, together with Milan Madaj
- 1995: 2nd, together with Milan Madaj
- 1996: 3rd, together with Milan Madaj
- 1998: 8th, together with Milan Madaj
- 2000: 6th, together with Milan Madaj
- 2001: 9th, together with Milan Madaj
