= Claudine Trécourt =

French ski mountaineer (born 1962)

Claudine Trécourt (born 1962) is a French ski mountaineer, high mountain guide and mountain climber. She currently teaches physics and sports. In May 2007 she also took part in an expedition on the Cho Oyu.

== Selected results ==
=== Ski mountaineering ===
- 1991:
  - 1st, Matterhorn ski marathon, Zermatt
- 1997:
  - 1st, French national ranking
- 1998:
  - 1st, French national ranking
  - 1st, Tour du Rutor (together with Alexia Zuberer)
  - 2nd, Patrouille des Glaciers (together with Alexia Zuberer and Jana Heczková)
- 1999:
  - 1st, French national ranking

==== Pierra Menta ====
- 1988: 1st, together with her sister, Sylvie Trécourt
- 1989: 1st, together with Sylvie Trécourt
- 1990: 1st, together with Sylvie Trécourt
- 1991: 1st, together with Sylvie Trécourt
- 1992: 2nd, together with Sylvie Trécourt
- 1994: 1st, together with Sylvie Trécourt
- 1995: 2nd, together with Sylvie Trécourt
- 1997: 1st, together with Alexia Zuberer
- 1998: 1st, together with Alexia Zuberer
- 1999: 1st, together with Danièle Hacquard

=== Climbing ===
- 1991:
  - 2nd, French Championship, Briançon
