= European Championships of Ski Mountaineering =

Ski mountaineering competition, 1992–2018

The European Championships of Ski Mountaineering were the European championships for national ski mountaineering teams from 1992 to 2009. They were held biannually and were separated into men's and women's competitions.

The first championships were sanctioned by the Comité International du Ski-Alpinisme de Compétition (CISAC). After the CISAC was merged with the International Council for Ski Mountaineering Competitions (ISMC) of the Union Internationale des Associations d'Alpinisme (UIAA), the competitions are held biannually by the ISCM. Since 2008, when the ISMC merged into the International Ski Mountaineering Federation (ISMF) the championships have been sanctioned by the ISMF. The original 9th edition, in 2009 decided to be held in Claut, Italy, in the end was held as the 6th edition of the World Championships.

== European championships since 1992 ==
- I 1992
- II 1996
- III 1999
- IV 2001 European Championship of Ski Mountaineering:
  - Team races "Seniors": January 27, 2001, Miage-Contamines-Somfy, France
  - Individual races: March 4, 2001, Jaca, Spain
  - Team races "Juniors" and "Espoirs": April 1, 2001, Adamello, Italy
- V 2003 European Championship of Ski Mountaineering, March 28, 2003 to March 30, Tatra Mountains, Slovakia
- VI 2005 European Championship of Ski Mountaineering, March 1, 2005 to March 5, 2005, Andorra
- VII 2007 European Championship of Ski Mountaineering, March 24, 2007, to March 28, 2007, Avoriaz, Morzine, France
- VIII 2009 European Championship of Ski Mountaineering, February 19, 2009 to February 24, 2009, Alpago, Tambre, Italy
- IX 2012 European Championship of Ski Mountaineering, February 4, 2012 to February 10, 2012, Pelvoux, Massif des Écrins, France
- X 2014 European Championship of Ski Mountaineering, February 14, 2014 to February 16, 2014, Arinsal-Arcalís, Vallnord, Andorra
- XI 2016 European Championship of Ski Mountaineering, February 5, 2016 to February 7, 2016, Salvan/Les Marécottes, Switzerland
- XII 2018 European Championship of Ski Mountaineering, February 22, 2018 to February 25, 2018, Nicolosi, Italy
