= Émilie Gex-Fabry =

Swiss ski mountaineer

Personal information
- Born: 21 May 1986 (age 40) Vevey, Switzerland

Sport
- Sport: Skiing
Medal record
Ski mountaineering
Gold medal – first place	2012 European Championship	Relay
Bronze medal – third place	2012 European Championship	Team

Émilie Gex-Fabry (born 21 May 1986) is a Swiss ski mountaineer.

Gex-Fabry was born in Vevey. She started ski mountaineering in 1991, and competed first in the 2000 Trophée des Gastlosen event. She has been member of the Swiss team since 2003, and lives in Val-d'Illiez. After several good results in younger age classes, she placed 10th in the "seniors" single race of the 2007 European Championship. She won the Patrouille des Glaciers in 2010 with a time of 7h41, the course record for female teams as of 2018. After five years of study at the University of Fribourg, she works as biologist/botanist.

== Selected results ==
- 2003:
  - 3rd (cadets), Trophée des Gastlosen
- 2004:
  - 1st, World Championship "cadets" single race
  - 1st, European Cup Trilogiski "cadets" single race
  - 1st (juniors filles), Trophée des Gastlosen
- 2005:
  - 2nd, European Championship "juniors" single race
  - 3rd, European Championship "juniors" vertical race
  - 1st, European Championship relay young
- 2006:
  - 1st (juniors), Trophée des Gastlosen
  - 3rd, World Championship "juniors" vertical race
- 2007:
  - 3rd, European Championship "espoir" single race
- 2008:
  - 2nd, World Championship "espoirs" vertical race
  - 2nd, World Championship "espoirs" long-distance race
  - 2nd, World Cup race Valerette Altiski
  - 3rd, World Championship "espoirs" single race
- 2009:
  - 3rd, European Championship "espoirs" single race
  - 3rd, European Championship "espoirs" vertical race
  - 4th, World Cup race Tour du Rutor with Gabrielle Magnenat
- 2010:
  - 5th, World Cup race Etna
  - 1st, Patrouille des Glaciers, new record
- 2011:
  - 4th, World Championship team race (together with Mireille Richard)
  - 4th, World Championship vertical, total ranking
  - 6th, World Championship single race
  - 6th, World Championship vertical race
  - 8th, World Championship sprint
- 2012:
  - 1st, European Championship relay, together with Séverine Pont-Combe and Mireille Richard
  - 3rd, European Championship team, together with Maude Mathys
  - 5th, European Championship single
  - 6th, World Championship vertical, combined ranking
  - 3rd, World Cup race in Etna, vertical race
  - 4th, World Cup race in Etna, single race
  - 3rd, World Cup race in Tromso, sprint race
  - 4th, World Cup race in Tromso, single race
  - 5th, World Cup overall
- 2013:
  - 3rd, World Championship team, together with Maude Mathys
  - 3rd, World Championship relay, with Maude Mathys and Mireille Richard
  - 3rd, World Cup race in Les Marécottes, sprint race
  - 3rd, World Cup race in Clusone, sprint race
  - 2nd, World Cup race in Tromso, sprint race
  - 4th, World Cup race in Tromso, single race
  - 3rd, World Cup sprint race
  - 6th, World Cup overall

=== Patrouille des Glaciers ===
- 2006: 1st on the track Arolla-Verbier, together with Coraly Pernet and Daniela Sigrist
- 2008: 1st on the track Arolla-Verbier, together with Mireille Richard and Mireia Miro
- 2010: 1st, together with Nathalie Etzensperger and Marie Troillet

=== Trofeo Mezzalama ===
- 2011: 4th, together with Gabrielle Magnenat and Corinne Favre

=== Pierra Menta ===
- 2013: 3rd, together with Maude Mathys
- 2014: 2nd, together with Axelle Mollaret
