= Zimmerli =

Zimmerli is a surname. Notable people with the surname include:

- Patrick Zimmerli
- Sandra Zimmerli (born 1965), Swiss ski mountaineer and radio journalist
- Walther Zimmerli (1907–1983), Swiss academic theologian

== See also ==
- Zimmerli Art Museum at Rutgers University
