= Majcen =

Majcen is a surname. Notable people with the surname include:

- Igor Majcen (born 1969), Slovenian freestyle swimmer
- Karl Majcen (born 1934), Austrian general
- Luka Majcen (born 1989), Slovenian footballer
- Nace Majcen (born 1968), Slovenian freestyle swimmer
- Rolf Majcen (born 1966) Austrian economist, lawyer, writer and ski mountaineer
