= Séverine Pont-Combe =

Swiss ski mountaineer and long-distance runner

Personal information
- Born: 28 June 1979 (age 47) Meyrin, Switzerland

Sport
- Sport: Skiing
Medal record
Ski mountaineering
Representing Switzerland
World Championships
Gold medal – first place	2008 World Championship	Relay
Silver medal – second place	2008 World Championship	Team
Bronze medal – third place	2006 World Championship	Team
Bronze medal – third place	2011 World Championship	Team
European Championships
Gold medal – first place	2012 European Championship	Team
Gold medal – first place	2012 European Championship	Relay
Silver medal – second place	2009 European Championship	Relay
Silver medal – second place	2012 European Championship	Sprint
Bronze medal – third place	2012 European Championship	Individual

Séverine Pont-Combe (born 28 June 1979) is a Swiss ski mountaineer and long-distance runner. She was born in Meyrin. She currently lives in Bernex.

== Selected results ==
=== Ski mountaineering ===
- 2003:
  - 1st, Zermatt-Rothorn run
- 2005:
  - 2nd, Swiss Cup team (together with Jeanine Bapst)
  - 4th, European Championship team race (together with Andréa Zimmermann)
  - 5th, European Championship single race
  - 8th, European Championship vertical race
- 2006:
  - 1st, Swiss Championship vertical race
  - 1st, Trophée des Gastlosen, together with Catherine Mabillard
  - 3rd, World Championship team race (together with Catherine Mabillard)
- 2008:
  - 1st, World Championship relay race (together with Marie Troillet, Nathalie Etzensperger and Gabrielle Magnenat)
  - 2nd, World Championship team race (together with Nathalie Etzensperger)
  - 6th, World Championship single race
  - 9th, World Championship combination ranking
- 2009:
  - 2nd, European Championship relay race (together with Nathalie Etzensperger and Gabrielle Magnenat)
  - 10th, European Championship single race
  - 1st, Trophée des Gastlosen, together with Natalie Etzensperger
- 2011:
  - 3rd, World Championship team race (together with Gabrielle Gachet, née Magnenat)
  - 5th, World Championship vertical race
  - 7th, World Championship vertical, combined ranking
- 2012:
  - 1st, European Championship team, together with Marie Troillet
  - 1st, European Championship relay, together with Émilie Gex-Fabry and Mireille Richard
  - 1st, World Championship vertical, combined ranking
  - 2nd, European Championship sprint
  - 3rd, European Championship single
  - 5th, European Championship vertical race
  - 1st, Patrouille de la Maya, together with Laëtitia Roux and Mireia Miró Varela

==== Patrouille des Glaciers ====
- 2006: 1st and course record, together with Catherine Mabillard and Gabrielle Magnenat
- 2008: 1st and course record, together with Nathalie Etzensperger and Gabrielle Magnenat

==== Pierra Menta ====
- 2006: 3rd, together with Catherine Mabillard
- 2008: 3rd, together with Gabrielle Magnenat
- 2009: 2nd, together with Gabrielle Magnenat
- 2012: 2nd, together with Laëtitia Roux

=== Running ===
- 2010:
  - 2nd (F30), Matterhorn run
  - 3rd, Iron-Terrific, Crans-Montana
