= Andreas Ringhofer =

Personal information
- Born: 19 December 1970 (age 55)

Sport
- Sport: Skiing
Medal record
Representing Austria

Andreas "Ringo" Ringhofer (born 19 December 1970) is an Austrian ski mountaineer, cross-country skier, cyclist and long-distance runner.

Ringhofer was a member of the national ski cross-country skiing squad for twelve years, and has been a member of the national team since the foundation of the ASKIMO. Also healthy restrictions since 2004 he took part in several competitions.

He is married with one daughter. Professionally he is a police officer and lives in Schladming.

== Selected results ==
=== Mountain running ===
- 1987:
  - 1st, Styrian Championship single
- 2002:
  - 1st, International Feuerkogel mountain run
- 2003:
  - 1st, Styrian Championship team
  - 1st, Planneralm mountain run
  - 3rd, Dolomitenmann

=== Cross-country skiing ===
- several times Styrian champion
- six times Austrian champion
- 1990:
  - 1st, European Cup
- 1991:
  - 1st, European Cup
  - 6th, Nordic World Ski Championships 4×10 km relay (together with Alois Schwarz, Alois Stadlober and Alexander Marent)
- 1992:
  - 18th: Winter Olympics 15 km pursuit

=== Ski mountaineering ===
- 2000:
  - 1st and course record, Hochwurzen-Berglauf
- 2001:
  - 1st and course record, Hochwurzen-Berglauf
- 2002:
  - 1st and course record, Hochwurzen-Berglauf
  - 2nd, Planai X-treme night ski marathon, Planai
  - 3rd, Wildsaurennen (literally: wild sow race)
- 2003:
  - 1st, Planai X-treme night ski marathon
  - 1st and course record, Hochwurzen-Berglauf
  - 1st, Wildsaurennen
  - 2nd, International Preberlauf
  - 4th, Dachsteinbock
  - 8th, Mountain Attack
- 2004:
  - 1st, Mountain Attack
  - 1st and course record, 1st Ötzi-Alpin-Marathon
  - 1st, Planai X-treme night ski marathon
  - 1st and course record, Hochwurzen-Berglauf
  - 1st, International Dachstein ride
  - 2nd, Austrian Championship
  - 2nd, Dachsteinbock
  - 2nd, Hochsunnlauf
  - 6th, World Championship vertical race
  - 9th, World Championship team race (together with Alexander Lugger)
- 2005:
  - 1st, Mountain Attack
  - 2nd, Austrian Championship
- 2006:
  - 1st, Hochwurzen-Berglauf
  - 1st and course record, Knappen-Königs-Trophy, Bischofshofen
  - 1st and course record, Champ Or Cramp
  - 1st, Ötzi-Alpin-Marathon team
  - 2nd, Mountain Attack
  - 2nd, Pizolada delle Dolomiti, Moena
  - 2nd, Sellaronda Skimarathon (together with Alois Blassing)
  - 2nd, Fritschi-Dachstein-Xtreme within the Austrian Championship, Schladming
- 2007:
  - 1st, Sellrain Valley marathon
  - 1st, Fritschi-Dachstein-Xtreme within the Austrian Championship, Schladming
  - 3rd, Mountain Attack
- 2008:
  - 1st, Mountain Attack
  - 1st, Rofan Xtreme team (together with Johann Wieland and Andreas Fischbacher)
  - 2nd, Rofan Xtreme single within the Austrian Championship
  - 3rd, Sellaronda Skimarathon (together with Heinz Verbnjak)
  - 4th, World Championship single race

=== Marathon ===
- 2005:
  - 3rd, LCC Vienna autumn marathon
- 2006:
  - 2nd, Wachau marathon
  - 5th, Graz marathon
