= Alexander Lugger =

Austrian ski mountaineer and coach

Personal information
- Born: 8 May 1968 (age 58) Lienz, Austria

Sport
- Sport: Skiing
Medal record
Representing Austria

Alexander Lugger (born 8 May 1968) is an Austrian ski mountaineer and coach of the national team.

Lugger was born in Lienz. He started ski mountaineering in 1984 and competed first in the Lesachtaler Skitourenlauf race in 1992. He holds several national champion titles amongst others.

== Selected results ==
- 2004:
  - 5th, World Championship single race
  - 6th, World Championship combination ranking
  - 9th, World Championship team race (together with Andreas Ringhofer)
- 2005:
  - 5th, European Championship single race
  - 10th, European Championship vertical race
- 2006:
  - 6th (and 1st "seniors II" ranking), Patrouille des Glaciers, together with Olivier Nägele and Tony Sbalbi
- 2007:
  - 1st, Scialpinistica del Monte Canin (together with Mario Scanu)
- 2008:
  - 1st, Austrian Championship
  - 1st, Lesachtaler Skitourenlauf
  - 1st, Laserzlauf
  - 5th, World Championship relay (together with Martin Bader, Andreas Kalß and Andreas Fischbacher)
  - 6th, World Championship long distance race
  - 7th, World Championship single race

=== Trofeo Mezzalama ===
- 2005: 4th, together with Hansjörg Lunger and Olivier Nägele
