= Vaudan =

Vaudan is a surname. Notable people with the surname include:

- Delia Vaudan (fl. 1970s–1990s), Italian luger
- Emmanuel Vaudan (born 1971), Swiss ski mountaineer and runner
- Mary-Jérôme Vaudan (born 1965), Swiss ski mountaineer mountain and runner
