= Gabrielle Gachet =

Swiss ski mountaineer

Gabrielle Gachet (Magnenat)
Personal information
- Born: 17 February 1980 (age 46) Vaulion, Switzerland

Sport
- Sport: Skiing
Medal record
Ski mountaineering
Representing Switzerland
World Championships
Gold medal – first place	2008 World Championship	Relay
Gold medal – first place	2011 World Championship	Relay
Silver medal – second place	2006 World Championship	Relay
Silver medal – second place	2008 World Championship	Long distance
Silver medal – second place	2010 World Championship	Relay
Bronze medal – third place	2008 World Championship	Team
Bronze medal – third place	2011 World Championship	Sprint
Bronze medal – third place	2011 World Championship	Team
European Championships
Gold medal – first place	2005 European Championship	Relay
Silver medal – second place	2005 European Championship	Team
Silver medal – second place	2009 European Championship	Team
Silver medal – second place	2009 European Championship	Relay
Bronze medal – third place	2007 European Championship	Relay

Gabrielle Gachet, née Magnenat (born 17 February 1980), is a Swiss ski mountaineer.

Gachet was born in Vaulion. In 2011, she married Grégory Gachet. She started ski mountaineering in 1998 and competed first in the Nocturne Morgins race in the same year. She has been member of the national team since 2000.

== Selected results ==
- 2002:
  - 10th, World Championship team race (together with Andréa Zimmermann)
- 2003:
  - 7th, European Championship single race
- 2004:
  - 8th, World Championship team race (together with Andréa Zimmermann)
- 2005:
  - 1st, World Cup team
  - 1st, European Championship relay race (together with Cristina Favre-Moretti and Isabella Crettenand-Moretti)
  - 2nd, European Championship team race (together with Catherine Mabillard)
  - 2nd, Mountain Attack marathon
  - 4th, European Championship single race
- 2006:
  - 1st, Tour du Rutor (together with Gloriana Pellissier)
  - 2nd, World Championship relay race (together with Nathalie Etzensperger, Catherine Mabillard and Séverine Pont-Combe)
  - 2nd, Mountain Attack marathon
  - 3rd, Trophée des Gastlosen, together with Jeanine Bapst
  - 6th, World Championship team race (together with Andréa Zimmermann)
- 2007:
  - 3rd, European Championship relay race (together with Catherine Mabillard and Nathalie Etzensperger)
  - 6th, European Championship team race (together with Marie Troillet)
  - 7th, European Championship single race
  - 8th, European Championship combination ranking
- 2008:
  - 1st, World Championship relay race (together with Marie Troillet, Nathalie Etzensperger, Séverine Pont-Combe)
  - 2nd, World Championship long distance race
  - 3rd, World Championship team race (together with Catherine Mabillard)
  - 8th, World Cup race, Val d'Aran
- 2009:
  - 2nd, European Championship relay race (together with Nathalie Etzensperger and Séverine Pont-Combe)
  - 2nd, European Championship team race (together with Nathalie Etzensperger)
  - 5th, European Championship combination ranking
  - 6th, European Championship single race
- 2010:
  - 2nd, World Championship relay race (together with Marie Troillet and Gabrielle Magnenat)
- 2011:
  - 1st, World Championship relay race (together with Nathalie Etzensperger and Mireille Richard)
  - 3rd, World Championship sprint
  - 3rd, World Championship team race (together with Séverine Pont-Combe)
  - 5th, World Championship single race
  - 5th, World Championship vertical, total ranking
- 2012:
  - 2nd, Patrouille de la Maya, together with Marie Troillet and Nathalie Etzensperger

=== Patrouille des Glaciers ===
- 2004: 2nd, together with Andréa Zimmermann and Jeanine Bapst
- 2006: 1st and course record, together with Catherine Mabillard and Séverine Pont-Combe
- 2008: 1st and course record, together with Nathalie Etzensperger and Séverine Pont-Combe

=== Pierra Menta ===
- 2007: 5th, together with Andréa Zimmermann
- 2008: 3rd, together with Séverine Pont-Combe
- 2009: 2nd, together with Séverine Pont-Combe
- 2010: 4th, together with Marie Troillet
- 2011: 3rd, together with Marie Troillet
- 2012: 3rd, together with Mireille Richard

=== Trofeo Mezzalama ===
- 2011: 4th, together with Émilie Gex-Fabry and Corinne Favre
