= Nicolas Bonnet =

Nicolas Bonnet may refer to:

- Nicolas Bonnet (ski mountaineer)
- Nicolas Bonnet (politician)
