= Premat =

Premat or Prémat is a surname. Notable people with the surname include:

- Alexandre Prémat (born 1982), French racing car driver
- Martial Premat (born 1977), French ski mountaineer
