= Catherine Mabillard =

Swiss ski mountaineer (born 1964)

Personal information
- Born: 9 June 1964 (age 62) Bex, Switzerland

Sport
- Sport: Skiing
Medal record
Women's ski mountaineering
Representing Switzerland
World Championships
Gold medal – first place	2004 Spain	Team
Gold medal – first place	2004 Spain	Relay
Bronze medal – third place	2002 France	Single
Bronze medal – third place	2006 Italy	Vertical race
Bronze medal – third place	2006 Italy	Team
Bronze medal – third place	2008 Switzerland	Team
European Championships
Gold medal – first place	2001 France	Team
Gold medal – first place	2003 Slovakia	Team
Silver medal – second place	2003 Slovakia	Single
Silver medal – second place	2005 Andorra	Team
Bronze medal – third place	2007 France	Team
Bronze medal – third place	2007 France	Relay

Catherine Mabillard (born 9 June 1964) from Troistorrents VS is a Swiss ski mountaineer and marathon mountain biker.

Mabillard was born in Bex. She started ski mountaineering in 1985 and competed first in the Trophée de Valerette race in 1986.

== Selected results ==
=== Ski mountaineering ===
- 1992:
  - 1st, Patrouille de la Maya A-course, together with Mélanie Farquet and Ruth Lutti
- 1994:
  - 1st, Patrouille de la Maya A-course, together with Sandra Zimmerli and Marika Ducret
- 1996:
  - 1st, Patrouille de la Maya A-course, together with Elsie Briguet and Marianne Chapuisat
- 1998:
  - 1st and course record, Tour de Matterhorn (together with Sandra Zimmerli and Cristina Favre-Moretti)
- 2001:
  - 1st, European Championship team race (together with Sandra Zimmerli)
  - 1st, Swiss Cup
  - 1st, Tour du Rutor (together with Véronique Ançay)
- 2002:
  - 1st, Patrouille de la Maya A-course, together with Véronique Ançay and Anne Bochatay
  - 3rd, World Championship single race
  - 3rd, Trophée des Gastlosen (together with Anne Bochatay)
  - 5th, World Championship team race (together with Christine Luyet)
  - 5th, World Championship combination ranking
- 2003:
  - 1st, European Championship team race (together Cristina Favre-Moretti)
  - 1st, Dolomiti Cup team (together with Cristina Favre-Moretti)
  - 1st, Trophée des Gastlosen (together with Anne Bochatay)
  - 2nd, European Championship single race
  - 2nd, European Championship combination ranking
- 2004:
  - 1st, World Championship team race (together with Cristina Favre-Moretti)
  - 1st, World Championship relay race (together with Cristina Favre-Moretti and Isabella Crettenand-Moretti)
  - 2nd, World Championship combination ranking
  - 2nd, Trophée des Gastlosen, together with Anne Bochatay
  - 4th, World Championship single race
- 2005:
  - 2nd, European Championship team race (together with Gabrielle Magnenat)
  - 5th, European Championship vertical race
- 2006:
  - 1st, Trophée des Gastlosen, together with Séverine Pont-Combe
  - 2nd, Swiss Championship vertical race
  - 3rd, World Championship vertical race
  - 3rd, World Championship team race (together with Séverine Pont-Combe)
- 2007:
  - 3rd, European Championship team race (together with Nathalie Etzensperger)
  - 3rd, European Championship relay race (together with Catherine Mabillard and Nathalie Etzensperger)
  - 6th, European Championship vertical race
  - 6th, European Championship combination ranking
  - 9th, European Championship single race
- 2008:
  - 3rd, World Championship team race (together with Gabrielle Magnenat)
  - 3rd, Mountain Attack race
  - 4th, World Championship long distance
- 2009:
  - 1st, Zermatt-Rothorn run
  - 1st, Trophée nocturne de la Berneuse, Leysin
  - 2nd, Sky ski trophée (together with Anne Bochatay)
  - 2nd, Mountain Attack race
- 2010:
  - 2nd, Zermatt-Rothorn run
  - 3rd, Sellaronda Skimarathon, together with Andréa Zimmermann
- 2012:
  - 2nd, Trophée des Gastlosen, together with Andréa Zimmermann

==== Pierra Menta ====
- 1999: 4th, together with Véronique Ançay
- 2003: 2nd, together with Anne Bochatay
- 2004: 1st, together with Cristina Favre-Moretti
- 2005: 3rd, together with Séverine Pont-Combe

==== Patrouille des Glaciers ====
- 1998: 1st and course record, together with Sandra Zimmerli and Cristina Favre-Moretti
- 2000: 1st, together with Sandra Zimmerli and Cristina Favre-Moretti
- 2004: 1st, and course record, together with Cristina Favre-Moretti and Isabella Crettenand-Moretti
- 2006: 1st, and course record, together with Gabrielle Magnenat and Séverine Pont-Combe
- 2008: 3rd, together with Cristina Favre-Moretti and Isabella Crettenand-Moretti
- 2010: 3rd, (and 1st in the "civilian women" ranking), together with Andréa Zimmermann and Sophie Dusautoir Bertrand

=== Mountain biking ===
==== Grand Raid Cristalp ====
- 1999: 3rd, 131 km
- 2001: 1st, 131 km
- 2002: 3rd, 131 km
