= Chantal Daucourt =

Swiss cyclist

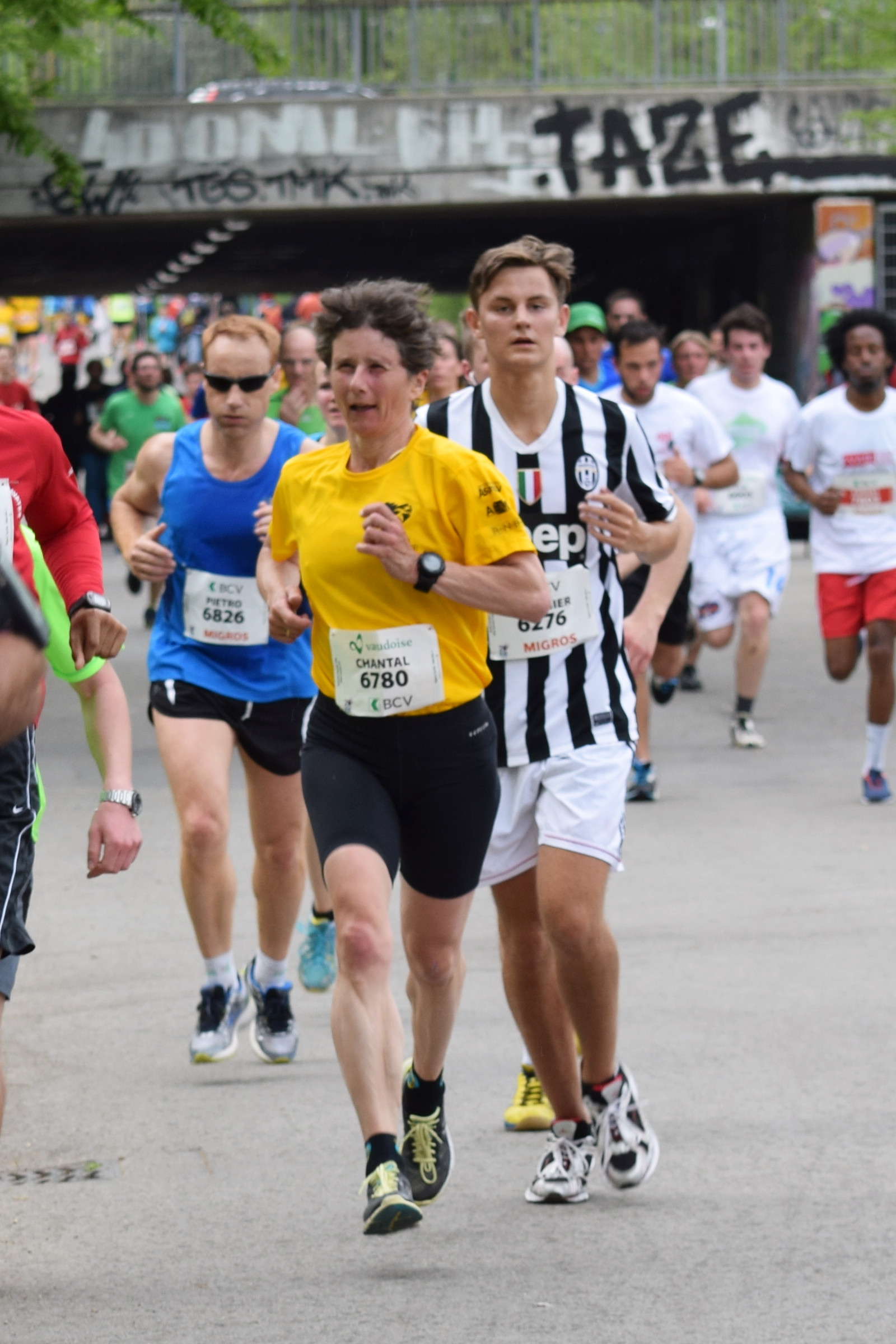
- Chantal Daucourt during the 2015 Lausanne 10 km race

Personal information
- Born: 23 June 1966 (age 60) Biel/Bienne, Switzerland

Cycling career
- Sport: Cycling
- Current team: Retired
- Role: Rider
- Rider type: Mountain biker
Medal record
Mountain biking
Gold medal – first place	1991 European Championships	cross-country
Gold medal – first place	1993 European Championships	cross-country
Gold medal – first place	1997 European Championships	cross-country
Gold medal – first place	1994 Swiss Championships	cross-country
Gold medal – first place	1998 Swiss Championships	cross-country
Silver medal – second place	1994 Swiss Championships	cross-country
Silver medal – second place	1995 Swiss Championships	cross-country
Silver medal – second place	1999 Swiss Championships	cross-country
Silver medal – second place	2000 Swiss Championships	cross-country
Bronze medal – third place	1992 European Championships	cross-country
Bronze medal – third place	1993 UCI World Cup	cross-country
Bronze medal – third place	1995 Bike & Trials World Championships	cross-country
Bronze medal – third place	1995 European Championships	cross-country
Bronze medal – third place	1997 Swiss Championships	cross-country
Bronze medal – third place	1997 UCI World Cup	cross-country

Chantal Daucourt (born 23 June 1966) is a Swiss professional cross-country mountain biker of the 1990s and 2000s (decade) as well as a competition ski mountaineer.

Daucourt was born in Biel/Bienne and grew up in Courroux. She works as a registered nurse at the University Hospital of Lausanne.

== Selected results ==
=== Mountain biking ===
- 1991:
  - 1st, European Mountain Bike cross-country Championships
  - 2nd, Groesbeek, Netherlands
  - 3rd, Berlin, Germany
- 1992:
  - 3rd, European Mountain Bike cross-country Championships
  - 3rd, UCI Mountain Bike World Cup, cross-country
  - 1st, Hunter Mountain, United States
  - 1st, Mount Snow, United States
  - 2nd, Kirchzarten, Germany
  - 3rd, Klosters, Switzerland
- 1993:
  - 1st, European Mountain Bike cross-country Championships
  - 1st, "Rund Um die Rigi" (around the Rigi), Gersau, Switzerland
  - 3rd, Bassano del Grappa, Italy
  - 3rd, Mount Snow, United States
- 1994:
  - 2nd, Swiss Cyclo-cross Championship, Switzerland
  - 3rd, Lenzerheide Switzerland
  - 3rd, Mount Snow, United States
- 1995:
  - 3rd, UCI Mountain Bike & Trials World Championships – Women's cross-country
  - 3rd, European Mountain Bike cross-country Championships
  - 2nd, Swiss Cyclo-cross Championship, Switzerland
  - 3rd, Madrid, Spain
- 1996:
  - 3rd, Swiss Cyclo-cross Championship, Switzerland
  - 3rd, Hawaii, United States
  - 3rd, Kristiansand, Norway
- 1997
  - 1st, European Mountain Bike cross-country Championships
  - 1st, Swiss Cyclo-cross Championship, Switzerland
  - 3rd, UCI Mountain Bike World Cup, cross-country
  - 2nd, Mont-Sainte-Anne, Canada
  - 3rd, Sankt Wendel, Germany
- 1998:
  - 1st, Swiss Cyclo-cross Championship, Switzerland
  - 1st, Bern circuit, Switzerland
  - 1st, Budapest, Hungary
  - 2nd, Canmore, Australia
- 1999:
  - 2nd, Swiss Cyclo-cross Championship, Switzerland
  - 41st, UCI Road World Championships – Women's road race
  - 1st, Dagmersellen cyclo-cross, Switzerland
- 2000:
  - 11th, Summer Olympics Women's cross-country mountain biking, Sydney, Australia
  - 10th, UCI Cyclo-cross World Championships – Women's elite
  - 1st, Roc d'Azur
  - 2nd, Swiss Cyclo-cross Championship, Switzerland

=== Ski mountaineering ===
- 2004:
  - 1st, Patrouille de la Maya A-course, together with Véronique Ançay and Mary-Jérôme Vaudan
- 2012:
  - 3rd, Trophée des Gastlosen, together with Sabine Gentieu

==== Patrouille des Glaciers ====
- 2004: 3rd, together with Véronique Ançay and Mary-Jérôme Vaudan
- 2008: 6th, together with Andréa Zimmermann and Sabine Gentieu
- 2010: 5th, together with Sabine Gentieu and Simone Hammer

==== Trofeo Mezzalama ====
- 2009: 10th, together with Lyndsay Meyer and Cécile Pasche
- 2011: 7th, together with Simone Hammer and Sabine Gentieu
