= Marie Troillet =

Swiss ski mountaineer (born 1983)

Personal information
- Born: 24 March 1983 (age 43) Bagnes, Switzerland

Sport
- Sport: Skiing
Medal record
Ski mountaineering
Representing Switzerland
World Championships
Gold medal – first place	2008 World Championship	Relay
Gold medal – first place	2011 World Championship	Team
Silver medal – second place	2010 World Championship	Team
Silver medal – second place	2010 World Championship	Relay
European Championships
Gold medal – first place	2012 European Championship	Team

Marie Troillet (born 24 March 1983) is a Swiss ski mountaineer.

Troillet was born in Bagnes. She started ski mountaineering in 2000 and has been member of the national team since 2004 as well as member of the Dynafit-Team since 2005. Marie Troillet, who teaches in an elementary school, lives in Lourtier. Her brother Florent is also a competition ski mountaineer.

== Selected results ==
- 2004:
  - 1st, World Championship single race ("juniors")
  - 3rd, Trophée des Gastlosen, together with Jeanine Bapst
  - 7th, World Championship vertical race ("seniors" ranking)
  - 9th, World Championship single race ("seniors" ranking)
- 2005:
  - 1st, European Championship single race ("juniors")
  - 1st, Swiss Cup team (together with Laëtitia Currat)
  - 8th, World Championship single race ("seniors" ranking)
  - 9th, World Championship vertical race ("seniors" ranking)
- 2006:
  - 1st, World Cup ("juniors")
  - 2nd, Trophée des Gastlosen, together with Andréa Zimmermann
- 2007:
  - 6th, European Championship team race (together with Gabrielle Magnenat)
  - 9th, European Championship combination ranking
- 2008:
  - 1st, World Championship relay race (together with Gabrielle Magnenat, Nathalie Etzensperger and Séverine Pont-Combe)
- 2010:
  - 2nd, World Championship relay race (together with Gabrielle Magnenat and Nathalie Etzensperger)
  - 2nd, World Championship team race (together with Nathalie Etzensperger)
  - 10th, World Championship single race
- 2011:
  - 1st, World Championship team race (together with Nathalie Etzensperger)
  - 4th, World Championship single race
  - 10th, World Championship vertical, combined ranking
- 2012:
  - 1st, European Championship team, together with Séverine Pont-Combe
  - 4th, European Championship single
  - 2nd, Patrouille de la Maya, together with Nathalie Etzensperger and Gabrielle Gachet, née Magnenat

=== Patrouille des Glaciers ===
- 2000: 1st, (short course) together with Stephanie May and Melanie Fellay
- 2004: 1st, (short course) together with Laëtitia Currat and Annick Rey
- 2006: 4th, together with Laëtitia Currat and Laëtitia Roux
- 2008: 5th ("seniors I" class ranking), mixed team together with Sophie Dusautoir Bertrand and Rico Elmer
- 2010: 1st, together with Nathalie Etzensperger and Émilie Gex-Fabry

=== Pierra Menta ===
- 2008: 8th, together with Laëtitia Currat
- 2010: 4th, together with Gabrielle Magnenat
- 2011: 3rd, together with Gabrielle Magnenat
