= Patrick Blanc (ski mountaineer) =

French ski mountaineer

Personal information
- Born: 28 April 1972 (age 54) Évian-les-Bains, Haute-Savoie

Sport
- Sport: Skiing
Medal record
Men's ski mountaineering
Representing France
World Championships
Gold medal – first place	2004 Spain	Vertical race
Gold medal – first place	2004 Spain	Team
Gold medal – first place	2004 Spain	Relay
Gold medal – first place	2006 Italy	Vertical race
Gold medal – first place	2006 Italy	Team
Silver medal – second place	2002 France	Single
Silver medal – second place	2002 France	Team
Silver medal – second place	2006 Italy	Relay

Patrick Blanc (born 28 April 1972) is a French ski mountaineer.

Blanc is born in Évian-les-Bains, Haute-Savoie and has been member of the national team since 2002. In 2008 he has been suspended from competitions for two years due to a positive dope test at the Patrouille des Glaciers race.

== Selected results ==
- 2002:
  - 2nd, World Championship single race
  - 2nd, World Championship team race (together with Tony Sbalbi)
  - 2nd, World Championship combination ranking
  - 2nd, French Championship single
- 2004:
  - 1st, World Championship vertical race
  - 1st, World Championship team race (together with Florent Perrier)
  - 1st, World Championship relay race (together with Stéphane Brosse, Cédric Tomio and Florent Perrier)
  - 6th, World Championship single race
- 2005
  - 3rd, World Cup team race (together with Stéphane Brosse)
- 2006:
  - 1st, World Championship vertical race
  - 1st, World Championship team race (together with Stéphane Brosse)
  - 2nd, World Championship relay race (together with Grégory Gachet, Stéphane Brosse and Florent Perrier)
- 2007:
  - 9th, European Championship team race (together with Tony Sbalbi)
- 2008:
  - 6th, World Championship team race (together with Didier Blanc)

=== Patrouille des Glaciers ===
- 1998: 7th (and 2nd, "seniors I" ranking), together with Stéphane Millius and Alberto Colajanni
- 2004: 1st and course record, together with Jean Pellissier and Stéphane Brosse
- 2006: 1st and course record, together with Stéphane Brosse and Guido Giacomelli

=== Pierra Menta ===
- 2002: 6th, together with Tony Sbalbi
- 2003: 1st, together with Tony Sbalbi
- 2004: 6th, together with Tony Sbalbi
- 2005: 1st, together with Stéphane Brosse
- 2006: 1st, together with Stéphane Brosse
- 2008: 3rd, together with Peter Svätojánsky

=== Trofeo Mezzalama ===
- 2003: 9th, together with Cédric Tomio and Tony Sbalbi
- 2005: 1st, together with Stéphane Brosse and Guido Giacomelli
- 2007: 2nd, together with Florent Perrier and Grégory Gachet
