= Isabella Crettenand-Moretti =

Swiss skier and athlete

Personal information
- Born: 26 August 1963 (age 62)

Sport
- Sport: Skiing
Medal record
Ski mountaineering
Representing Switzerland
World Championships
Gold medal – first place	2004 World Championship	Relay
Silver medal – second place	2004 World Championship	Vertical race
Silver medal – second place	2004 World Championship	Team
Bronze medal – third place	2004 World Championship	Single
European Championships
Gold medal – first place	2005 European Championship	Team
Gold medal – first place	2005 European Championship	Relay
Bronze medal – third place	2005 European Championship	Single

Isabella Crettenand-Moretti, née Moretti (born 26 August 1963), is a female Swiss ski mountaineer, marathon mountain biker, long-distance and mountain runner. She lives in Sion.

Her twin sister Cristina Favre-Moretti also competes in endurance sport events.

== Selected results ==
=== Ski mountaineering ===
- 2004:
  - 1st, World Championship relay race (together with Catherine Mabillard and Cristina Favre-Moretti)
  - 1st, Trophée des Gastlosen, together with Cristina Favre-Moretti
  - 2nd, World Championship vertical race
  - 2nd, World Championship team race (together with Jeanine Bapst)
  - 3rd, World Championship single race
  - 3rd, World Championship combination ranking
- 2005:
  - 1st, European Championship team race (together with Cristina Crettenand-Moretti)
  - 1st, European Championship relay race (together with Cristina Favre-Moretti and Gabrielle Magnenat)
  - 1st, Pierra Menta (together with Cristina Favre-Moretti)
  - 2nd, European Championship combination ranking
  - 3rd, European Championship single race
  - 4th, European Championship vertical race

==== Patrouille des Glaciers ====
- 2004: 1st and course record, together with Catherine Mabillard and Cristina Favre-Moretti
- 2008: 3rd, together with Catherine Mabillard and Cristina Favre-Moretti

=== Running ===
- 2010: 1st, Iron-Terrific, Crans-Montana

=== Mountain biking ===
==== Grand Raid Cristalp ====
- 1999: 1st, 131 km
- 2003: 2nd, 131 km
