= Iolanda García =

Spanish ski mountaineer (born 1975)

Personal information
- Full name: Iolanda García Sàez
- Born: 21 June 1975 (age 51) Sallent de Llobregat, Spain

Sport
- Sport: Skiing

Iolanda García Sàez (born 21 June 1975) is a Spanish ski mountaineer. She was born in Sallent de Llobregat (Province of Barcelona).

== Selected results ==
- 2002:
  - 4th, Spanish Championship team (together with Olga Elena Deyurka)
- 2003:
  - 1st, Spanish Championship team (together with Cristina Bes Ginesta)
  - 1st, Spanish Championship single
  - 4th, European Cup team (together with Cristina Bes Ginesta
  - 4th, Spanish Cup
  - 9th, European Championship team race (together with Cristina Bes Ginesta)
- 2004:
  - 5th, World Championship relay race (together with Emma Roca Rodríguez and Cristina Bes Ginesta)
