= 2003 European Championship of Ski Mountaineering =

The 2003 European Championship of Ski Mountaineering was the fifth European Championship of ski mountaineering and was held in the Tatra Mountains, Slovakia, from March 28, 2003 to March 30, 2003. The competition was organized by the International Council for Ski Mountaineering Competitions (ISMC) of the Union Internationale des Associations d'Alpinisme (UIAA).

== Results ==
=== Nation ranking and medals ===
(all age groups)

| ranking | country | team | | | | individual | | | | |
| ranking | country | points | | | | points | | | | total points |
|---|---|---|---|---|---|---|---|---|---|---|
| 1 | France | 452 | | 1 | 1 | 969 | 1 | 2 | 1 | 1421 |
| 2 | Italy | 312 | 1 | | | 953 | 4 | 3 | 2 | 1265 |
| 3 | Switzerland | 342 | 1 | 1 | 1 | 805 | 3 | 1 | 2 | 1147 |
| 4 | Slovakia | 208 | | | | 777 | | | 1 | 985 |
| 5 | Spain | 168 | | | | 694 | | 1 | | 862 |
| 6 | Germany | 278 | | | | 370 | | | | 648 |
| 7 | Poland | 106 | | | | 266 | | | | 372 |
| 8 | Czech Republic | 142 | | | | 121 | | | | 263 |
| 9 | Bulgaria | 72 | | | | 182 | | | | 254 |
| 10 | Andorra | 62 | | | | 120 | | | 1 | 182 |
| 11 | Slovenia | 14 | | | | 146 | | | | 160 |
| 12 | Austria | | | | | 148 | | | | 148 |
| 13 | Romania | 18 | | | | 124 | | 1 | | 142 |
| 14 | Greece | 6 | | | | 67 | | | | 73 |
| 15 | Liechtenstein | | | | | 69 | | | | 69 |
| 16 | Denmark | 1 | | | | 3 | | | | 4 |
| 17 | Russia | | | | | 2 | | | | 2 |

=== Team ===
Event held on March 28, 2003

List of the best 10 teams by gender:

==== Women ====
| ranking | team | total time |
|---|---|---|
| | (Switzerland) Mabillard/Favre-Moretti | 02h 53' 52"*) |
| | (France) Ducognon/Oggeri | 03h 02' 56"*) |
| | (France) C. Favre/Lathuraz | 03h 10' 26"*) |
| 4 | (Italy) Raso/Riva | 03h 10' 35"*) |
| 5 | (Germany) Maurer/J. Graßl | 03h 14' 33"*) |
| 6 | (France) Guigon/N. Blanc | 03h 30' 32"*) |
| 7 | (Germany) Treimer/Echtler-Schleich | 03h 39' 21"*) |
| 8 | (Slovakia) Pažitná/Lackovičová | 03h 40' 10"*) |
| 9 | (Spain) García Sàez/C. Bes Ginesta | 03h 45' 26"*) |
| 10 | (Czech Republic) Oršulová/Bulířová | 04h 09' 16"*) |

==== Men ====
| ranking | team | total time |
|---|---|---|
| | (Switzerland) Farquet/Elmer | 02h 23' 37"*) |
| | (Italy) Reichegger/Brunod | 02h 23' 43"*) |
| | (Italy) Vescovo/Mezzanotte | 02h 24' 01"*) |
| 4 | (France) Brosse/Gignoux | 02h 24' 31"*) |
| 5 | (Switzerland) Hug/Taramarcaz | 02h 27' 57"*) |
| 6 | (Switzerland) J.-Y. Rey/Masserey | 02h 28' 33"*) |
| 7 | (France) B. Blanc/Champange | 02h 28' 54"*) |
| 8 | (France) Meilleur/Tomio | 02h 29' 16"*) |
| 9 | (Italy) Battel/J. Pellissier | 02h 29' 24"*) |
| 10 | (Switzerland) Moret/Pittex | 02h 31' 14"*) |

*) total time including 3 penalty minutes

=== Individual ===
Event held on March 30, 2003

List of the best 10 participants by gender:

==== Women ====
| ranking | participant | total time |
|---|---|---|
| | (Switzerland) Cristina Favre-Moretti | 02h 25' 33" |
| | (Switzerland) Catherine Mabillard | 02h 32' 21" |
| | (France) Valérie Ducognon | 02h 39' 08" |
| 4 | (Germany) Judith Graßl | 02h 40' 56" |
| 5 | (France) Corinne Favre | 02h 42' 35" |
| 6 | (France) Delphine Oggeri | 02h 44' 27" |
| 7 | (Switzerland) Gabrielle Magnenat | 02h 44' 39" |
| 8 | (Germany) Traudl Maurer | 02h 45' 50" |
| 9 | (France) Nathalie Bourillon | 02h 49' 28" |
| 10 | (France) Carole Toïgo | 02h 50' 33" |

==== Men ====
| ranking | participant | total time |
|---|---|---|
| | (Italy) Manfred Reichegger | 02h 01' 20" |
| | (France) Stéphane Brosse | 02h 01' 39" |
| | (Switzerland) Heinz Blatter | 02h 02' 08" |
| 4 | (Switzerland) Rico Elmer | 02h 02' 51" |
| 5 | (Switzerland) Pierre-Marie Taramarcaz | 02h 03' 35" |
| 6 | (Italy) Dennis Brunod | 02h 03' 42" |
| 7 | (Italy) Graziano Boscacci | 02h 04' 44" |
| 8 | (Italy) Camillo Vescovo | 02h 04' 44" |
| 9 | (France) Cédric Tomio | 02h 04' 54" |
| 10 | (Switzerland) Damien Farquet | 02h 05' 03" |

=== Combination ranking ===
combination ranking including the results of the individual and team races

List of the best 10 participants by gender:

==== Women ====
| ranking | participant |
|---|---|
| | (Switzerland) Cristina Favre-Moretti |
| | (Switzerland) Catherine Mabillard |
| | (France) Valérie Ducognon |
| 4 | (France) Delphine Oggeri |
| 5 | (France) Corinne Favre |
| 6 | (Germany) Judith Graßl |
| 7 | (Germany) Traudl Maurer |
| 8 | (Italy) Maria Luisa Riva |
| 9 | (France) Véronique Lathuraz |
| 10 | (France) Nathalie Blanc |

==== Men ====
| ranking | participant |
|---|---|
| | (Italy) Manfred Reichegger |
| | (France) Stéphane Brosse |
| | (Switzerland) Rico Elmer |
| 4 | (Italy) Dennis Brunod |
| 5 | (Switzerland) Damien Farquet |
| 6 | (Italy) Camillo Vescovo |
| 7 | (Switzerland) Pierre-Marie Taramarcaz |
| 8 | (Italy) Mirco Mezzanotte |
| 9 | (France) Cédric Tomio |
| 10 | (Switzerland) Alexander Hug |
