= Martin Riz =

Italian ski mountaineer (born 1980)

Personal information
- Born: 16 September 1980 (age 45)

Sport
- Sport: Skiing
Medal record
Ski mountaineering
Representing Italy
World Championships
Gold medal – first place	2008 World Championship	Relay
Silver medal – second place	2004 World Championship	Relay

Martin Riz (born 16 September 1980) is an Italian ski mountaineer.

== Selected results ==
- 2004:
  - 2nd, World Championship relay race (together with Carlo Battel, Graziano Boscacci and Guido Giacomelli)
- 8th, World Championship vertical race
- 2007:
  - 2nd, Scialpinistica del Monte Canin (together with Mirco Mezzanotte)
  - 4th, Trofeo Mezzalama (together with Tony Sbalbi and Alain Seletto)
  - 7th, Pierra Menta (together with Jean Pellissier)
- 2008:
  - 1st, World Championship relay race (together with Dennis Brunod, Manfred Reichegger and Denis Trento)
  - 1st, Ski Alp Val Rendena
- 2009:
  - 3rd, Sci Alpinistica dell'Adamello
