= Didier Blanc =

French ski mountaineer

Personal information
- Born: 7 July 1984 (age 42)

Sport
- Sport: Skiing
Medal record
Ski mountaineering
Representing France
World Championships
Gold medal – first place	2010 World Championship	Team
Bronze medal – third place	2010 World Championship	Single
Bronze medal – third place	2010 World Championship	Relay
Bronze medal – third place	2011 World Championship	Team
Bronze medal – third place	2011 World Championship	Relay

Didier Blanc (born 7 June 1984) is a French ski mountaineer.

== Selected results ==
- 2006:
  - 7th, World Championship team race (together with Martial Premat)
- 2008:
  - 6th, World Championship team race (together with Patrick Blanc)
  - 6th (and 5th in the "international men" ranking), Patrouille des Glaciers (together with Tony Sbalbi and Alexandre Pellicier)
- 2009:
  - 5th, European Championship relay race (together with Nicolas Bonnet, Martial Premat and Tony Sbalbi)
  - 6th, European Championship single race
  - 7th, European Championship combination ranking
- 2010:
  - 1st, World Championship team race (together with Florent Perrier)
  - 1st, World Championship combination ranking
  - 3rd, World Championship single race
  - 3rd, World Championship relay race (together with Florent Perrier, William Bon Mardion and Grégory Gachet)
  - 5th, World Championship vertical race
- 2011:
  - 3rd, World Championship relay, together with Xavier Gachet, Yannick Buffet and William Bon Mardion
  - 3rd, World Championship team race (together with William Bon Mardion)
  - 4th, World Championship single race
  - 8th, World Championship vertical, total ranking

=== Pierra Menta ===
- 2008: 9th, together with Philippe Blanc
- 2009: 4th, together with Tony Sbalbi
- 2010: 7th, together with Alexandre Pellicier
- 2011: 1st, together with Kílian Jornet Burgada

=== Trofeo Mezzalama ===
- 2009: 3rd, together with Tony Sbalbi and Alain Seletto
- 2011: 1st, together with Kílian Jornet Burgada and William Bon Mardion
