= Véronique Ançay =

Swiss ski mountaineer

Véronique Ançay-Carron, née Ançay (born 1970), from Fully is a Swiss ski mountaineer. She also takes part in mountain bike and ultramarathon competitions.

== Selected results ==
- 2000:
  - 1st, Patrouille de la Maya A-course, together with Nicole Gillioz and Christine Luyet
- 2001:
  - 1st, Tour du Rutor (together with Catherine Mabillard)
  - 3rd, Trophée des Gastlosen (European Cup, together with Christine Luyet)
  - 7th, European Championship team race (together with Christine Luyet)
- 2002:
  - 1st, Patrouille de la Maya A-course, together with Catherine Mabillard and Anne Bochatay
  - 1st, Diamir Race Diemigtal Swiss Cup race (together with Catherine Mabillard)
  - 3rd, Valerette Altiski 2000 Swiss Cup race
- 2004:
  - 1st, Patrouille de la Maya A-course, together with Chantal Daucourt and Mary-Jérôme Vaudan
- 2008:
  - 1st, Patrouille de la Maya A-course, together with Mary-Jérôme Vaudan and Anne Bochatay
- 2009:
  - 3rd, Trophée des Gastlosen (together with Valérie Berthod-Pellissier)

=== Patrouille des Glaciers ===
- 2002: 2nd, together with Nicole Gillioz and Christine Luyet
- 2004: 3rd, together with Chantal Daucourt and Mary-Jérôme Vaudan
- 2008: 5th (and 1st in the "civilian women" ranking), together with Anne Bochatay and Mary-Jérôme Vaudan
- 2010: 6th (and 3rd in the "civilian women" ranking), together with Mary-Jérôme Vaudan and Valérie Berthod-Pélissier

=== Pierra Menta ===
- 1999: 4th, together with Catherine Mabillard
- 2001, 3rd, together with Nicole Gillioz
- 2005: 6th, together with Nathalie Blanc

=== Trofeo Mezzalama ===
- 2011: 10th, together with Valérie Berthod-Pellissier and Mary-Jérôme Vaudan
