= Austrian champions =

Winners of nationwide competitions in Austria

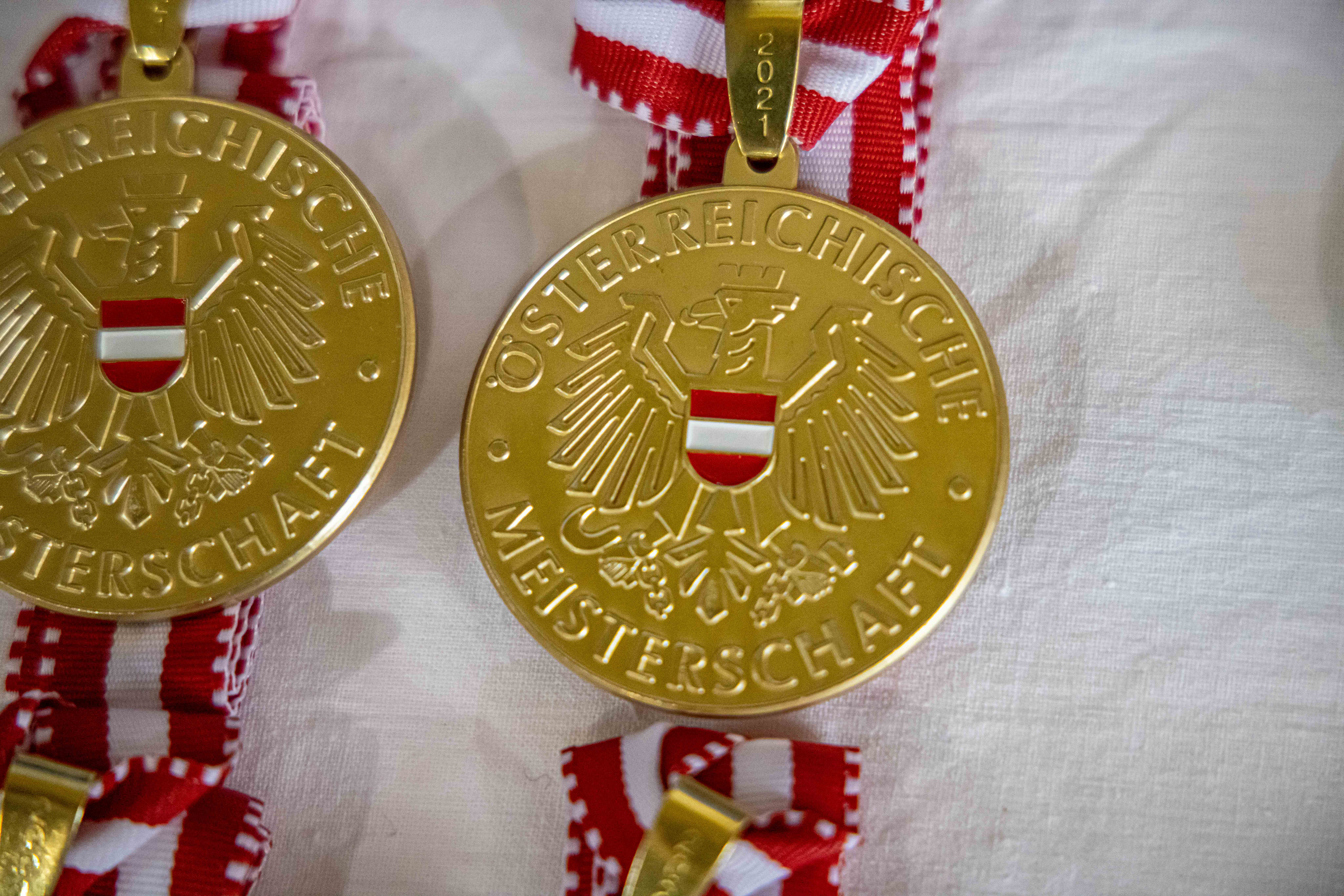
Österreichische-Meisterschaft Goldmedaillen

Austrian champions (in German: Österreichischer Meister) is the general name for a champion in a team or singles competition Austria's elite national sport (bundesliga) competitions and is thus comparable with the title of German champions. In contrast to Austrian state champions, the title Austrian champions is assigned in all age categories and also in disciplines in which the Austrian federal sport organization is not recognized. Austrian championships are won in many different sports.

== Lists of Austrian champions ==
- Austrian champions (football)
- Austrian champions (ice hockey)
- Austrian Judo Bundesliga
