= Emma Roca =

Spanish ski mountaineer (1973–2021)

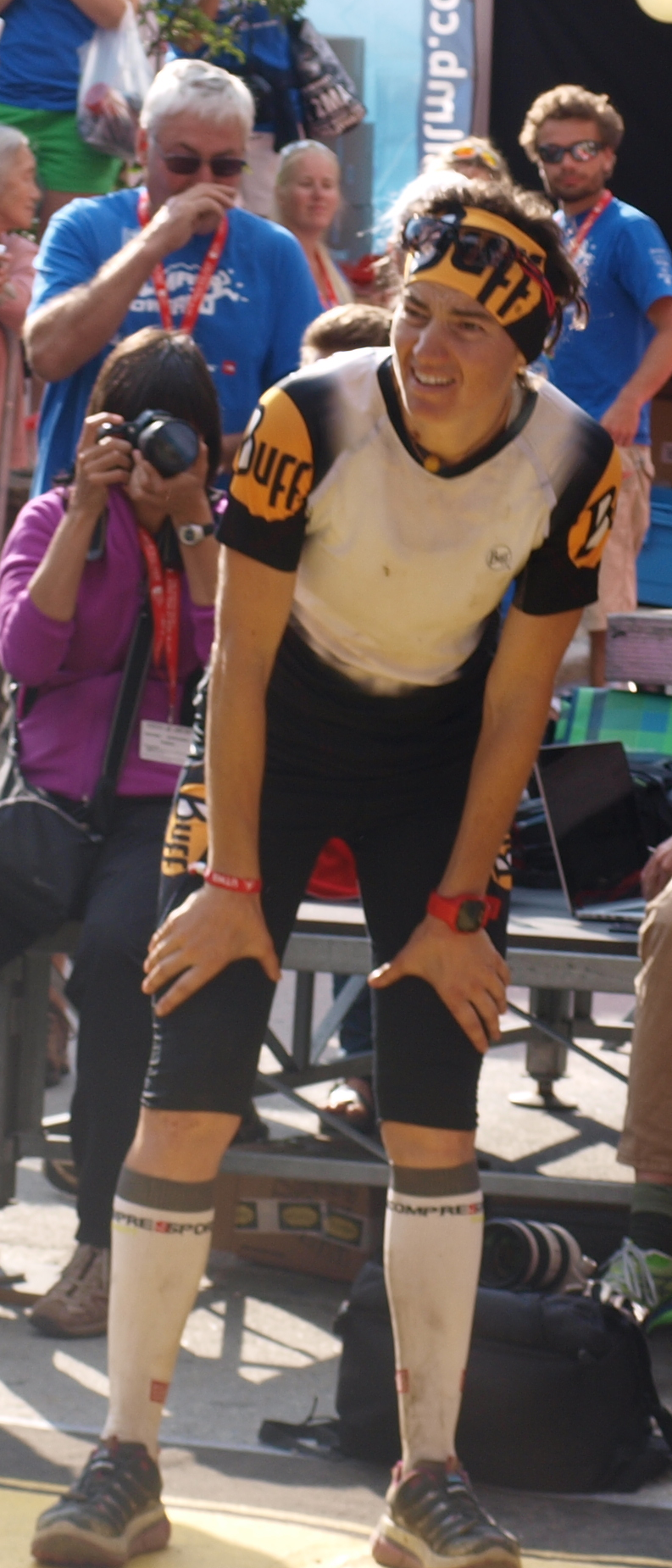
- Roca in 2013

Personal information
- Full name: Emma Roca Rodríguez
- Born: 12 August 1973 Barcelona, Spain
- Died: 18 June 2021 (aged 47)

Sport
- Sport: Skiing

Emma Roca Rodríguez (12 August 1973 – 18 June 2021) was a Spanish Catalan ski mountaineer and an eco-challenge member. She represented Spain which she was a captain, she helped her team to get in the top 10 spot.

Roca worked as a firefighter and taught biomechanics at university. She lived in Talló, Lleida.

Roca died on 18 June 2021 from vulvar cancer at the age of 47.

Emma's ultrarunning achievements included Emma winning the Costa Brava Stage Run 85 km, the Trail Vall de Ribes 65 km, the Trail Andorra La Sportiva 65k, the Run Rabbit Run 100 mile and the Leadville Trail 100 mile. She took second at the Hardrock 100 and Ultra-Trail Penyagolosa, placed third at UTMB (the Ultra Trail Mont Blanc, considered by many to be the ultimate ultra marathon) and the Ultra Trail Australia, and took fifth at the Western States 100 mile.

== Selected results ==
- 1998
  - Land Rover Trophy as part of Team Spain, Camel Trophy Tierra del Fuego '98
- 2000
  - 2nd, Trofeo Kima
- 2002
  - 3rd, Trofeo Kima
- 2004
  - 2nd, Open International, San Carlos de Bariloche
- 2005
  - 8th, World Cup team (together with Cristina Bes Ginesta)
- 2008
  - 7th (and 5th in the "civilian international women" ranking), Patrouille des Glaciers (together with Cristina Bes Ginesta and Izaskun Zubizarreta Guerendiain)
- 2010
  - 1st, Adventure Racing World Championship, Team Buff Thermacool (together with Benjamen Midena, Fran Lopez Costoya, Arnau Julia)

=== Ultramarathon ===
- 2010
  - 1st, World Raid Championship,
- 2011
  - 2nd, Marathon des Sables, Morocco
  - 2nd, Cavalls del Vent
- 2012
  - 3rd, Ultra Trail de Mont Blanc (UTMB)
- 2013
  - 3rd, Ultra Trail de Mont Blanc (UTMB)
- 2015
  - 5th, Weston States

=== Ski Mountaineering Championships ===
- 2002
  - 2nd, Spanish Championship Ski Mountaineering
- 2004
  - 5th, World Championship relay race (together with Cristina Bes Ginesta and Iolanda García Sàez)
  - 10th, World Championship Ski Mountaineering team race (together with Cristina Bes Ginesta)
- 2005
  - 1st, Spanish Championship Ski Mountaineering team (together with Cristina Bes Ginesta)
  - 5th, European Championship Ski Mountaineering team race (together with Cristina Bes Ginesta)
  - 5th, European Championship Ski Mountaineering relay race (together with Cristina Bes Ginesta and Sara Gros Aspiroz)
  - 10th, European Championship Ski Mountaineering single race
- 2008
  - 5th, World Championship Ski Mountaineering relay race (together with Cristina Bes Ginesta, Gemma Arró Ribot and Izaskun Zubizarreta Guerendiain)
  - 7th, World Championship Ski Mountaineering team race (together with Izaskun Zubizarreta Guerendiain)
  - 10th, World Championship Ski Mountaineering long distance

=== Pierra Menta ===
- 2002
  - 5th, together with Cristina Bes Ginesta
- 2005
  - 4th, together with Jeannie Wall
- 2008
  - 6th, together with Cristina Bes Ginesta
