= Mirco Mezzanotte =

Italian ski mountaineer (born 1974)

Personal information
- Born: 11 February 1974 (age 52)

Sport
- Sport: Skiing
Medal record
Ski mountaineering
Bronze medal – third place	2003 European Championship	Team
Bronze medal – third place	2005 European Championship	Vertical race

Mirco Mezzanotte (born 11 February 1974) is an Italian ski mountaineer.

== Selected results ==
- 2000:
  - 7th ("seniors I" class ranking), Patrouille des Glaciers (together with Oswald Santin and Manfred Dorfmann)
- 2001:
  - 3rd, Sellaronda Skimarathon (together with Franco Nicolini)
- 2002:
  - 1st, Mountain Attack
  - 1st, Dolomiti Cup team (together with Franco Nicolini)
  - 9th, World Championship team race (together with Franco Nicolini)
- 2003:
  - 3rd, European Championship team race (together with Camillo Vescovo)
  - 8th, European Championship combination ranking
- 2004:
  - 8th, World Championship team race (together with Guido Giacomelli)
- 2005:
  - 1st, Dolomiti Cup team (together with Carlo Battel)
  - 1st, Tour du Rutor (together with Guido Giacomelli)
  - 2nd, World Cup team (together with Guido Giacomelli)
  - 3rd, European Championship vertical race
- 2006:
  - 1st, Adamello Ski Raid (together with Hansjörg Lunger and Guido Giacomelli)
  - 10th, World Championship vertical race
- 2007:
  - 1st, Dolomiti Cup team (together with Olivier Nägele)
  - 2nd, Sellaronda Skimarathon (together with Daniele Pedrini)
  - 2nd, Scialpinistica del Monte Canin (together with Martin Riz)
- 2008:
  - 1st, Hochgrat-Skirallye
  - 2nd, Ski Alp Val Rendena

=== Trofeo Mezzalama ===
- 2003: 4th, together with Camillo Vescovo and Guido Giacomelli
- 2007: 5th, together with Graziano Boscacci and Ivan Murada
