= Traudl Maurer =

German ski mountaineer and runner

Traudl Maurer (born 1961) from Mittenwald is a German ski mountaineer and long-distance runner.

== Selected results ==
=== Ski mountaineering ===
- 2003:
  - 1st, German Championship
  - 1st, Dammkarwurm
  - 2nd, Mountain Attack marathon
  - 4th, European Championship team race (together with Judith Graßl)
  - 7th, European Championship combination ranking
  - 8th, European Championship single race
- 2004:
  - 3rd, Mountain Attack marathon
  - 3rd, Dammkarwurm
- 2009:
  - 1st, Wildsaurennen (literally: wild sow race) relay rece (together with Christine Gürtler, Regina Regina and Anita Vogelsberger)

=== Mountain running ===
- 2004:
  - 1st, Lauf Los Tyrol (women class 1)
- 2006:
  - 1st, Lauf Los Tyrol (women class 1)
  - 3rd, Zugspitzlauf (Zugspitze run)
- 2007:
  - 1st, Lauf Los Tyrol (women class 1)
  - 5th, Zugspitzlauf
