= Camillo Vescovo =

Italian ski mountaineer (born 1960)

Personal information
- Born: 1960 (age 65–66)

Sport
- Sport: Skiing
Medal record
Ski mountaineering
Bronze medal – third place	2003 European Championship	Team

Camillo Vescovo (born 1960) is an Italian ski mountaineer, who lives in the Valtellina region.

== Selected results ==
- 1996:
  - 6th, Pierra Menta (together with Cheto Blavaschi)
- 2000:
  - 7th (and 2nd in "seniors II" ranking), Patrouille des Glaciers ("seniors II" ranking), together with Ivan Murada and Graziano Boscacci
- 2003:
  - 1st, Trofeo Kima
  - 3rd, European Championship team race (together with Mirco Mezzanotte)
  - 6th, European Championship combination ranking
  - 8th, European Championship single race
  - 4th, Trofeo Mezzalama (together Guido Giacomelli and Mirco Mezzanotte)
- 2004:
  - 1st, Italian Cup
