= Lenka Hiklová =

Personal information
- Born: 8 March 1980 (age 46)

Sport
- Sport: Skiing
- Club: HK Kamenná Chata

Lenka Hiklová, née Lackovičová (born 8 March 1980), of the HK Kamenná Chata is a Slovak ski mountaineer. Amongst others, she finished eighth in the team event of the 2003 European Championship of Ski Mountaineering, together with Anna Pažitná.
