= Johann Wieland =

Austrian ski mountaineer (born 1972)

Personal information
- Born: 1 January 1972 (age 54)

Sport
- Sport: Skiing
Medal record
Representing Austria

Johann Wieland (born 1 January 1972) is an Austrian ski mountaineer.

Wieland started ski mountaineering in 1984 and competed first in the Preberlauf event in 1999. He has been member of the ASKIMO national team since 2008 and lives in Tamsweg.

== Selected results ==
- 2004:
  - 1st, Preberlauf
  - 1st, Mountain Attack tour
  - 7th and Austrian record, Patrouille des Glaciers "seniors II" class ranking (together with Hermann Kofler and Rolf Majcen)
- 2005:
  - 1st, Preberlauf
  - 1st, Mountain Attack tour
- 2006:
  - 1st, Preberlauf
  - 1st, Mountain Attack tour
- 2007:
  - 1st and course record, Preberlauf
  - 4th, Mountain Attack marathon
- 2008:
  - 1st, Rofan Xtreme team (together with Andreas Ringhofer and Andreas Fischbacher)
  - 1st, Preberlauf
  - 3rd, Austrian Championship
  - 8th, World Championship combination ranking
- 2009:
  - 4th, European Championship relay race (together with Wolfgang Klocker, Martin Bader and Alexander Fasser)
  - 10th, European Championship combination ranking
- 2010:
  - 2nd, Mountain Attack race
