= Andreas Fischbacher =

Austrian ski mountaineer

Personal information
- Born: 30 October 1973 (age 52) Ramsau am Dachstein, Austria

Sport
- Sport: Skiing
Medal record
Representing Austria

Andreas Fischbacher (born 30 October 1973) is an Austrian ski mountaineer.

Fischbacher was born in Ramsau am Dachstein. He started ski mountaineering in 1998.

== Selected results ==
- 2000
  - 1st, Hochwurzen-Berglauf
- 2008:
  - 1st, Rofan Xtreme team (together with Andreas Ringhofer and Johann Wieland)
  - 5th, World Championship relay race (together with Martin Bader, Andreas Kalß and Alexander Lugger)
