= Andreas Kalß =

Austrian ski mountaineer

Personal information
- Born: 8 April 1982 (age 44) Linz, Austria

Sport
- Sport: Skiing
Medal record
Representing Austria

Andreas Kalß (born 8 April 1982) is an Austrian ski mountaineer.

Kalß was born in Linz. He started ski mountaineering in 2003 and competed first in the 2005 Mountain Attack event. He has been member of the ASKIMO national team since 2008 and lives in Roßleithen.

== Selected results ==
- 2006:
  - 8th, Loserrennen
- 2007:
  - 1st, Bosrucklauf
  - 3rd, Friedl Gumpold memorial race
- 2008:
  - 5th, World Championship relay race (together with Andreas Fischbacher, Martin Bader and Alexander Lugger)
