= Annamaria Baudena =

Italian ski mountaineer and long-distance runner

Medal record

Ski mountaineering

Representing Italy

World Championships
Bronze medal – third place	2004 World Championship	Relay

Annamaria Baudena (born 1963) is an Italian ski mountaineer and long-distance runner. She also competes in bicycle races.

== Selected results ==
- 2001:
  - 1st, Dolomiti Cup team (together with Bice Bones)
  - 3rd, Transacavallo (together with Christiane Nex)
  - 9th, World Championship team race (together with Bice Bones)
- 2004:
  - 3rd, World Championship relay race (together with Christiane Nex and Gloriana Pellissier)
  - 6th, World Championship vertical race
- 2006:
  - 2nd, Kappa Marathon
  - 3rd, Ötzi Alpin Marathon relay race (together with Petra Dibiasi and Waltraud Untersteiner)
