= Cristina Favre-Moretti =

Swiss athlete

Personal information
- Born: 26 August 1963 (age 62)

Sport
- Sport: Skiing
Medal record
Ski mountaineering
Representing Switzerland
World Championships
Gold medal – first place	2004 World Championship	Single
Gold medal – first place	2004 World Championship	Vertical race
Gold medal – first place	2004 World Championship	Team
Gold medal – first place	2004 World Championship	Relay
European Championships
Gold medal – first place	2003 European Championship	Single
Gold medal – first place	2003 European Championship	Team
Gold medal – first place	2005 European Championship	Single
Gold medal – first place	2005 European Championship	Vertical race
Gold medal – first place	2005 European Championship	Team
Gold medal – first place	2005 European Championship	Relay

Cristina Favre-Moretti, née Moretti (born 26 August 1963) is a Swiss ski mountaineer, long-distance runner and mountain biker. Her twin sister Isabella Crettenand-Moretti also competes in endurance sport events.

== Selected results ==
=== Ski mountaineering ===
- 1998:
  - 1st and course record, Tour de Matterhorn (together with Catherine Mabillard and Sandra Zimmerli)
- 2003:
  - 1st, European Championship single race
  - 1st, European Championship team race (together with Catherine Mabillard)
  - 1st, European Championship combination ranking
  - 1st, Dolomiti Cup team (together with Catherine Mabillard)
- 2004:
  - 1st, World Championship single race
  - 1st, World Championship vertical race)
  - 1st, World Championship team race (together with Catherine Mabillard)
  - 1st, World Championship relay race (together with Catherine Mabillard and Isabella Crettenand-Moretti)
  - 1st, World Championship combination ranking
  - 1st, Transcavallo race team
  - 1st, Trophée des Gastlosen, together with Isabella Crettenand-Moretti
- 2005:
  - 1st, European Championship single race
  - 1st, European Championship vertical race
  - 1st, European Championship team race (together with Isabella Favre-Moretti)
  - 1st, European Championship relay race (together with Isabella Crettenand-Moretti and Gabrielle Magnenat)
  - 1st, European Championship combination ranking

==== Trofeo Mezzalama ====
- 2003: 1st, together with Chiara Raso and Arianna Follis

==== Pierra Menta ====
- 2004: 1st, together with Catherine Mabillard
- 2005: 1st, together with Isabella Crettenand-Moretti

==== Patrouille des Glaciers ====
- 1998: 1st and course record, together with Catherine Mabillard and Sandra Zimmerli
- 2000: 1st, together with Catherine Mabillard and Sandra Zimmerli
- 2004: 1st, together with Catherine Mabillard and Isabella Crettenand-Moretti
- 2008: 3rd, together with Catherine Mabillard and Isabella Crettenand-Moretti

=== Mountain biking ===
- 2002: 1st, Grand Raid Cristalp, 76 km course

=== Running ===
- 2010:
  - 1st, Iron-Terrific, Crans-Montana
