= Cristina Bes =

Catalan ski mountaineer

Personal information
- Full name: Cristina Bes Ginesta
- Born: 21 March 1977 (age 49) Girona, Spain

Sport
- Sport: Skiing
Medal record
Ski mountaineering
Representing Spain
World Championships
Bronze medal – third place	2011 World Championship	Relay

Cristina "Tina" Bes (i) Ginesta (born 21 March 1977) is a Catalan ski mountaineer.

Bes was born in Girona. She started ski mountaineering in 1999 and competed first in the same year. In 2000, she became a member of the national team. Her brother Jordi is also a competition ski mountaineer.

== Selected results ==
- 2001:
  - 9th, European Championship team race (together with Eulàlia "Lali" Gendrau Gallifa)
- 2002:
  - 2nd, Spanish Championship team (together with Gemma Furió Francisco)
  - 3rd, Spanish Championship
  - 4th, Spanish Cup
- 2003:
  - 1st, Spanish Championship team (together with Iolanda García Sàez)
  - 2nd, Spanish Championship team single
  - 3rd, Spanish Cup
  - 4th, European Cup team (together with Iolanda García Sàez)
  - 9th, European Championship team race (together with Iolanda García Sàez)
- 2004:
  - 2nd, Spanish Championship team single
  - 3rd, Open Internacional, San Carlos de Bariloche
  - 5th, World Championship relay race (together with Emma Roca Rodríguez and Iolanda García Sàez)
  - 10th, World Championship (together with Emma Roca Rodríguez)
- 2005:
  - 1st, Spanish Championship team single
  - 1st, Spanish Championship team (together with Emma Roca Rodríguez)
  - 2nd, Spanish Championship vertical race
  - 5th, Spanish Cup
  - 5th, European Championship team race (together with Emma Roca Rodríguez)
  - 5th, European Championship relay race (together with Emma Roca Rodríguez and Sara Gros Aspiroz)
  - 7th, World Cup race, Salt Lake City
  - 8th, World Cup team (together with Emma Roca Rodríguez)
- 2006:
  - 1st, Spanish Championship team single
  - 2nd, Spanish Championship vertical race
  - 5th, World Championship relay race (together with Gemma Arró Ribot, Naila Jornet Burgada and Izaskun Zubizarreta)
  - 9th, World Championship team race (together with Izaskun Zubizarreta Guerendiain)
- 2008:
  - 5th, World Championship relay race (together with Gemma Arró Ribot, Izaskun Zubizarreta Guerendiain and Emma Roca Rodríguez)
  - 7th (and 5th in the "civilian international women" ranking), Patrouille des Glaciers (together with Emma Roca Rodríguez and Izaskun Zubizarreta Guerendiain)
- 2010:
  - 4th, World Championship relay race (together with Mireia Miró Varela and Gemma Arró Ribot)
- 2011:
  - 3rd, World Championship relay (together with Gemma Arró Ribot and Mireia Miró Varela)
  - 7th, World Championship team race (together with Izaskun Zubizarreta Guerendiain)

=== Pierra Menta ===
- 2002: 5th, together with Emma Roca Rodríguez
- 2008: 6th, together with Emma Roca Rodríguez
- 2010: 5th, together with Patricia Althape-Arhondo
