= Mireille Richard =

Swiss ski mountaineer

Personal information
- Born: 4 May 1989 (age 37) Evionnaz, Switzerland

Sport
- Sport: Skiing
Medal record
Ski mountaineering
Representing Switzerland
World Championships
Gold medal – first place	2011 Claut	Relay
European Championships
Gold medal – first place	2012 Pelvoux	Sprint
Gold medal – first place	2012 Pelvoux	Relay

Mireille Richard (born 4 May 1989) is a Swiss ski mountaineer.

== Career ==
Mireille was born and lives in Evionnaz. She started ski mountaineering in 1994, and competed first in the 2003 Diamir race. She has been member of the Swiss team since 2005.

== Selected results ==
- 2005:
  - 1st (juniors), Trophée des Gastlosen
- 2010:
  - 7th (and 1st in the espoirs ranking), Trophée des Gastlosen (ISMF World Cup), together with Victoria Kreuzer
- 2011:
  - 1st, World Championship, relay, together with Nathalie Etzensperger and Gabrielle Gachet
  - 4th, World Championship, sprint
  - 4th, World Championship, team, together with Émilie Gex-Fabry
  - 6th, World Championship, combination ranking
  - 7th, World Championship, individual
- 2012:
  - 1st, European Championship, sprint
  - 1st, European Championship, relay, together with Séverine Pont-Combe and Émilie Gex-Fabry
  - 10th, European Championship, combination ranking

=== Pierra Menta ===
- 2010: 6th, together with Simone Hammer
- 2011: 5th, together with Martina Valmassoi
- 2012: 3rd, together with Gabrielle Gachet
