= Wolfgang Klocker =

Austrian ski mountaineer

Personal information
- Born: 12 November 1971 (age 54)

Sport
- Sport: Skiing
Medal record
Representing Austria

Wolfgang Klocker (born 12 November 1971) is an Austrian ski mountaineer and non-commissioned officer in the rank of a Stabswachtmeister.

Klocker started ski mountaineering in 1997 and competed first in the 2003 Laserzlauf. He has been member of the ASKIMO national team since 2008 and lives in Amlach.

== Selected results ==
- 2005:
  - 5th, Austrian Championship
- 2006:
  - 2nd, Tyrolian Championship
  - 3rd, Mountain Attack short course
- 2007:
  - 2nd, Tyrolian Championship
  - 3rd, Mountain Attack short course
  - 5th, Austrian Championship
- 2009:
  - 4th, European Championship relay race (together with Johann Wieland, Martin Bader and Alexander Fasser)
- 2010:
  - 5th, World Championship relay race (together with Alexander Fasser, Jakob Herrmann and Markus Stock)

=== Patrouille des Glaciers ===
- 2008: 10th (and 2nd "military international" class ranking), together with Georg Simair and Markus Stock
- 2010: 8th ("ISMF men" class ranking), together with Alexander Fasser and Markus Stock
