= Delphine Oggeri =

French ski mountaineer (born 1973)

Personal information
- Born: 1973 (age 52–53)

Sport
- Sport: Skiing
Medal record
Women's ski mountaineering
Representing France
World Championships
Gold medal – first place	2002 France	Team
Silver medal – second place	2004 Spain	Relay
European Championships
Silver medal – second place	1999	Team
Silver medal – second place	2001 France	Team
Silver medal – second place	2003 Slovakia	Team

Delphine Oggeri (born 1973) from Granier near Beaufort, Savoie, is a French ski mountaineer.

== Selected results ==
- 1999:
  - 1st, La Belle étoile race (together with Valérie Ducognon)
  - 1st, La Tournette race (together with Valérie Ducognon)
  - 2nd, European Championship team race (together with Valérie Ducognon)
  - 2nd, La Bellevarde race, Val-d'Isère
  - 3rd, European Cup race "Miage Contamines Somfy" (together with Valérie Ducognon)
- 2000:
  - 1st, French Championship team race (together with Valérie Ducognon)
  - 1st, La Tournette race (together with Valérie Ducognon)
  - 1st, Miage Contamines Somfy race (together with Valérie Ducognon)
  - 1st, L'Ubayenne race (together with Valérie Ducognon)
  - 1st, European Cup race "Vacheressane" (together with Valérie Ducognon)
  - 1st, European Cup race in Bivio (together with Valérie Ducognon)
  - 2nd, European Cup race in Bormio (together with Valérie Ducognon)
  - 2nd, European Cup total team ranking (together with Valérie Ducognon)
  - 2nd, French national ranking
- 2001:
  - 1st, French Championship team race (together with Valérie Ducognon)
  - 1st, French national ranking
  - 2nd, European Championship team race (together with Valérie Ducognon)
  - 2nd, European Cup total team ranking (together with Valérie Ducognon)
- 2002:
  - 1st, World Championship team race (together with Valérie Ducognon)
  - 1st, Trophée des Gastlosen (together with Delpine Oggeri)
  - 2nd, World Championship combination ranking
  - 4th, World Championship single race
- 2003:
  - 2nd, European Championship team race (together with Nathalie Bourillon and Véronique Lathuraz)
  - 4th, European Championship combination ranking
  - 6th, European Championship single race
- 2004:
  - 2nd, World Championship relay race (together with Delpine Oggeri)
  - 4th, World Championship team race (together with Valérie Ducognon)
  - 5th, World Championship single race
  - 5th, World Championship combination ranking
- 2005:
  - 1st, Pyramide d’Oz (together with Valérie Ducognon)

=== Pierra Menta ===
- 1999: 5th, together with Valérie Ducognon
- 2000: 2nd, together with Valérie Ducognon
- 2001: 2nd, together with Valérie Ducognon
- 2002: 1st, together with Valérie Ducognon
- 2003: 1st, together with Valérie Ducognon
- 2004: 3rd, together with Muriel Vaudey
- 2005: 2nd, together with Valérie Ducognon
- 2008: 5th, together with Valérie Ducognon
