= Martin Bader (ski mountaineer) =

Austrian ski mountaineer (born 1985)

Personal information
- Born: 3 May 1985 (age 41) Innsbruck, Austria

Sport
- Sport: Skiing
Medal record
Representing Austria

Martin Bader (born 3 May 1985) is an Austrian ski mountaineer and member of the national selection.

Bader was born and lives in Innsbruck He started ski mountaineering in 2000. For his first time, he competed at the 2005 Vennspitzlauf.

== Selected results ==
- 2007:
  - 1st, Imster ski mountaineering race
- 2008:
  - 5th, World Championship, relay, together with Andreas Kalß, Andreas Fischbacher and Alexander Lugger
- 2009:
  - 4th, European Championship, relay, together with Johann Wieland, Wolfgang Klocker and Alexander Fasser
- 2010:
  - 1st, Hochkönigtrophy
  - 2nd, Lesachtaler ski race
