= Andréa Zimmermann =

Swiss ski mountaineer and mountain runner (born 1976)

Personal information
- Full name: Andréa Ursina Zimmermann
- Born: 18 August 1976 (age 49) Biel/Bienne, Switzerland

Sport
- Sport: Skiing

Andréa Ursina Zimmermann (born 18 August 1976) from Monthey is a female Swiss ski mountaineer and mountain runner.

Zimmermann was born in Biel/Bienne. She competed first in the 2000 Trophée du Muveran race and has been member of the national team since 2001.

== Selected results ==
=== Ski mountaineering ===
- 2001:
  - 3rd, Swiss Cup, scratch
- 2002:
  - 10th, World Championship team race (together with Gabrielle Magnenat)
- 2004:
  - 2nd, Patrouille des Glaciers (together with Gabrielle Magnenat and Jeanine Bapst)
  - 8th, World Championship team race (together with Gabrielle Magnenat)
- 2005:
  - 4th, European Championship (together with Séverine Pont-Combe)
- 2006:
  - 2nd, Trophée des Gastlosen, together with Marie Troillet
  - 6th, World Championship team race (together with Gabrielle Magnenat)
- 2007:
  - 7th, Trofeo Mezzalama (together with Anne Carron-Bender and Christine Diaque)
- 2010:
  - 3rd, Sellaronda Skimarathon, together with Catherine Mabillard
- 2012:
  - 2nd, Trophée des Gastlosen, together with Catherine Mabillard

==== Pierra Menta ====
- 2005: 5th, together with Jeanine Bapst
- 2007: 5th, together with Gabrielle Magnenat

==== Patrouille des Glaciers ====
- 2008: 6th (and 2nd in the "civilian women" ranking), together with Chantal Daucourt and Sabine Gentieu
- 2010: 3rd, (and 1st in the "civilian women" ranking), together with Catherine Mabillard and Sophie Dusautoir Bertrand

=== Running ===
- 2004:
  - 2nd (women I), Jeizibärg-Lauf, Gampel
- 2008:
  - 2nd, Jeizibärg-Lauf / Valais Mountain Running Championship, Gampel
  - 3rd, Dérupe Vercorin
