= Jeannie Wall =

American ski mountaineer

Personal information
- Born: June 6, 1969 (age 57)

Sport
- Sport: Skiing
Medal record
Representing United States

Jeannie Wall (born June 6, 1969) from Bozeman, Montana is an American ski mountaineer and member of the United States Ski Mountaineering Association (USSMA) ski team.

Wall is the youngest of eleven children. She was the first female to cross the finish line in the 32-mile American Birkebeiner Nordic ski race, in Cable, Wisconsin, in 2002, as well as the top American female on the North American Randonnee Rally circuit. She was also USA Team Manager at the 2006 World Championship.

== Selected results ==
- 2003:
  - 1st, North American Randonnée Championships, Jackson Hole
  - 1st, Wasatch PowderKeg, Alta
- 2004:
  - 5th, World Championship vertical race
  - 1st, Open Internacional, San Carlos de Bariloche
- 2005:
  - 4th, Pierra Menta (together with Emma Roca Rodríguez)
- 2006:
  - 1st, America's Cup
