= Lucie Oršulová =

Czech ski mountaineer and mountain climber

Personal information
- Born: 18 January 1975 (age 51)

Sport
- Sport: Skiing
- Club: SAC Špindlerúv Mlyn
Medal record
Representing Czech Republic

Lucie Oršulová (born 18 January 1975) is a Czech ski mountaineer and mountain climber. She is member of the SAC Špindlerúv Mlyn as well as member of the national team. Professionally she is attorney at law.

== Selected results ==
- 2003:
  - 10th, European Championship team race (together with Kamila Bulířová)
- 2004:
  - 4th, World Championship relay race (together with Alice Korbová and Kamila Bulířová)
  - 9th, World Championship vertical race
- 2005:
  - 10th, European Championship team race (together with Alice Korbová)
