= Izaskun Zubizarreta =

Spanish ski mountaineer (1970–2024)

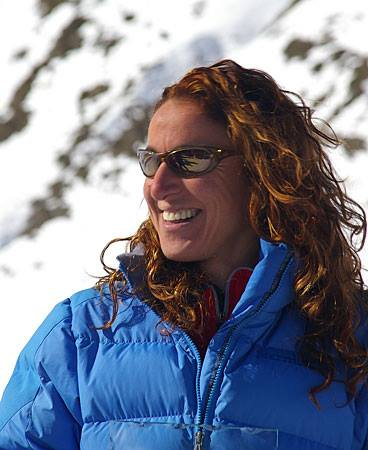
- Zubizarreta in 2011

Personal information
- Full name: Izaskun Zubizarreta Gerendiain
- Born: 30 September 1970 Oiartzun, Spain
- Died: 5 August 2024 (aged 53)

Sport
- Sport: Skiing

Izaskun Zubizarreta Gerendiain (30 September 1970 – 5 August 2024) was a Spanish ski mountaineer.

== Biography ==
Zubizarreta was born in Oiartzun on 30 September 1970. She started ski mountaineering in 1997 and competed first in the Cronoescalada race in Cerler in 2006. In the same year, she became a member of the national team. Zubizarreta Gerendiain died on 5 August 2024, at the age of 53.

== Selected results ==
- 2006:
  - 1st, Spanish Championship team (together with María Luisa Romerales)
  - 1st, Spanish Cup
  - 2nd, Spanish Championship single
  - 3rd, Spanish Championship vertical race
  - 5th, World Championship relay race (together with Gemma Arró Ribot, Naila Jornet Burgada and Cristina Bes Ginesta)
  - 9th, World Championship team race (together with Cristina Bes Ginesta)
- 2007:
  - 1st, Spanish Championship vertical race
  - 6th, European Championship relay race (together with Gemma Arró Ribot and Maribel Martín de la Iglesia)
  - 8th, European Championship team race (together with Gemma Arró Ribot)
- 2008:
  - 4th, World Championship combination ranking
  - 5th, World Championship relay race (together with Cristina Bes Ginesta, Gemma Arró Ribot and Emma Roca Rodríguez)
  - 7th, World Championship single race
  - 7th, World Championship team race (together with Emma Roca Rodríguez)
  - 7th (and 5th in the "civilian international women" ranking), Patrouille des Glaciers (together with Cristina Bes Ginesta and Emma Roca Rodríguez)
  - 9th, World Championship long distance race
- 2009:
  - 4th, European Championship team race (together with Mireia Miró Varela)
  - 4th, European Championship relay race (together with Gemma Arró Ribot and Mireia Miró Varela)
  - 7th, European Championship combination ranking
- 2011:
  - 7th, World Championship team race (together with Cristina Bes Ginesta)
  - 6th, Pierra Menta, together with Marta Riba Carlos
