= Vincent Meilleur =

French ski mountaineer

Personal information
- Born: 6 May 1974 (age 52) Moûtier, France

Sport
- Sport: Skiing
Medal record
Men's ski mountaineering
Representing France
European Championships
Silver medal – second place	2001 France	Team

Vincent Meilleur (born 6 May 1974) is a French ski mountaineer. He was born in Moûtier.

== Selected results ==
- 1998:
  - 2nd, European Cup
  - 2nd, Grand Béal race
  - 3rd, French Championship
- 1999:
  - 8th, European Championship
- 2000:
  - 3rd, European Cup
- 2001:
  - 2nd, European Championship team race (together with Cédric Tomio)
  - 2nd, European Cup
  - 2nd, French Championship
  - 3rd, Trophée des Gastlosen (European Cup, together with Cédric Tomio)
- 2002:
  - 1st, Trophée des Gastlosen (together with Cédric Tomio)
  - 6th, World Championship team race (together with Cédric Tomio)
- 2003:
  - 8th, European Championship team race (together with Cédric Tomio)
- 2004:
  - 6th, World Championship team race (together with Cédric Tomio)
- 2005:
  - 4th, European Championship team race (together with Bertrand Blanc)

=== Pierra Menta ===
- 1997: 5th, together with Jean-Michel Bouvier
- 1998: 5th, together with Jérôme Arpin
- 1999: 6th, together with Jérôme Arpin
- 2000: 7th, together with Jean Pellissier
- 2001: 3rd, together with Cédric Tomio
- 2002: 4th, together with Cédric Tomio
- 2003: 3rd, together with Cédric Tomio
- 2004: 2nd, together with Cédric Tomio
- 2005: 5th, together with Bertrand Blanc
- 2006: 5th, together with Bertrand Blanc
- 2007: 4th, together with William Bon Mardion
