= Christiane Nex =

Italian ski mountaineer (born 1973)

Personal information
- Born: 30 November 1973 (age 52)

Sport
- Sport: Skiing
Medal record
Ski mountaineering
Representing Italy
World Championships
Bronze medal – third place	2004 World Championship	Relay
European Championships
Silver medal – second place	2005 European Championship	Relay

Christiane Nex (born 30 November 1973) is an Italian ski mountaineer.

== Selected results ==
- 2002:
  - 3rd, Transacavallo (together with Annamaria Baudena)
- 2004:
  - 1st, Italian Cup
  - 1st, Tour du Rutor (together with Gloriana Pellissier)
  - 3rd, World Championship relay race (together with Annamaria Baudena and Gloriana Pellissier)
  - 4th, Patrouille des Glaciers (together with Gisella Bendotti and Micol Murachelli)
  - 6th, World Championship team race (together with Maria Luisa Riva)
- 2005:
  - 1st, Trofeo Mezzalama (together with Gloriana Pellissier and Natascia Leonardi Cortesi)
  - 1st, Italian Cup
  - 2nd, European Championship relay race (together with Gloriana Pellissier and Francesca Martinelli)
  - 6th, European Championship team race (together with Gloriana Pellissier)
- 2007:
  - 4th, Pierra Menta (together with Laura Chiara Besseghini)
  - 5th, Tour du Rutor (together with Laura Chiara Besseghini)
