= Fasser =

Fasser may refer to:

- Alexander Fasser (born 1975), Austrian ski mountaineer and mountain biker
- Ekkehard Fasser (1952–2021), Swiss bobsledder
