= Anne Bochatay =

Swiss ski mountaineer and police officer

Anne Bochatay (born 1968) is a Swiss ski mountaineer and police officer in Andermatt. In the committee of the CAS Martigny section, she is responsible for the youth group.

== Selected results ==
- 1994:
  - 1st, Patrouille de la Maya B-course, together with Madeleine Troillet and Nathalie Rieben
- 1998:
  - 1st, Patrouille de la Maya A-course, together with Ingrid Farquet and Annelise Locher
- 1999:
  - 1st, Swiss Championship
- 2002:
  - 1st, Swiss Championship
  - 1st, Patrouille de la Maya A-course, together with Catherine Mabillard and Véronique Ançay
  - 3rd, Trophée des Gastlosen (together with Catherine Mabillard)
  - 8th, World Championship single race
- 2003:
  - 1st, Swiss Championship
  - 1st, Trophée des Gastlosen, together with Catherine Mabillard
  - 2nd, Pierra Menta (together with Catherine Mabillard)
- 2004:
  - 2nd, Trophée des Gastlosen, together with Catherine Mabillard
- 2008:
  - 1st, Patrouille de la Maya A-course, together with Mary-Jérôme Vaudan and Véronique Ançay
- 2009:
  - 2nd, Sky ski trophée (together with Catherine Mabillard)

=== Patrouille des Glaciers ===
- 2000: 5th, together with Martine Bellon and Annelyse Locher
- 2008: 5th (and 1st in the "civilian women" ranking), together with Véronique Ançay and Mary-Jérôme Vaudan
- 2010: 2nd ("military men 2" ranking), in a mixed team together with Carlo Kuonen and Guillaume Clavien
