= Carlo Battel =

Italian ski mountaineer

Personal information
- Born: 6 May 1972 (age 54) Bolzano Novarese, Italy

Sport
- Sport: Skiing
Medal record
Men's ski mountaineering
Representing Italy
World Championships
Silver medal – second place	2004 Spain	Team
Silver medal – second place	2004 Spain	Relay
Bronze medal – third place	2002 France	Single

Carlo Battel (born 6 May 1972) is an Italian ski mountaineer.

Battel was born in Bolzano Novarese. He started ski mountaineering in 1993 and competed first in the Trofeo Cemin race in the same year. He was member of the national team after 2002.

== Selected results ==
- 2000:
  - 3rd, Sellaronda Skimarathon (together with Franco Nicolini)
- 2002:
  - 1st, Italian Championship
  - 1st, Sellaronda Skimarathon (together with Fabio Meraldi)
  - 3rd, World Championship single race
- 2003:
  - 9th, European Championship team race (together with Jean Pellissier)
- 2004:
  - 2nd, World Championship team race (together with Jean Pellissier)
  - 2nd, World Championship relay race (together with Graziano Boscacci, Martin Riz and Guido Giacomelli)
- 2005:
  - 1st, Dolomiti Cup team (together with Mirco Mezzanotte)
  - 5th, European Championship team race (together with Jean Pellissier)
- 2006:
  - 6th, World Championship team race (together with Jean Pellissier)

=== Pierra Menta ===
- 2001: 5th, together with Omar Obrandi
- 2004: 4th, together with Jean Pellissier

=== Trofeo Mezzalama ===
- 1999: 7th, together with Adriano Greco and Bruno Zen
- 2001: 3rd, together with Franco Nicolini and Enrico Pedrini
