= Olivier Nägele =

Liechtenstein ski mountaineer (born 1972)

Personal information
- Born: 17 March 1972 (age 54)

Sport
- Sport: Skiing

Olivier Nägele (born 17 March 1972) is a Liechtensteiner ski mountaineer.

Nägele started ski mountaineering in 1990 and competed his first Mountain Attack race in 2000. Because Liechtenstein has no national ski mountaineering team, he has mostly taken part in international events as a single participant.

== Selected results ==
- 2002:
  - 8th, Trofeo Mezzalama (together with Alexander Hug and Nicolao Leone Lanfranchi)
- 2002:
  - 8th, World Championship single race
- 2003:
  - 3rd, Mountain Attack marathon
- 2004:
  - 3rd, Mountain Attack marathon
  - 5th, World Championship vertical race
  - 8th, World Championship single race
- 2005:
  - 3rd, Mountain Attack marathon
  - 4th, Trofeo Mezzalama (together with Alexander Lugger and Hansjörg Lunger)
- 2006:
  - 6th (and 1st "seniors II" ranking), Patrouille des Glaciers, together with Alexander Lugger and Tony Sbalbi
  - 9th, World Championship vertical race
  - 1st, Trophée des Gastlosen, together with Marcel Marti
- 2007:
  - 1st, Dolomiti Cup team (together with Mirco Mezzanotte)
  - 8th, European Championship vertical race

=== Pierra Menta ===
- 2001: 10th, together with Alexander Hug
- 2002: 7th, together with Jean Pellissier
