= Sara Gros =

Spanish ski mountaineer (born 1983)

Personal information
- Full name: Sara Gros Aspiroz
- Born: 9 June 1983 (age 43)

Sport
- Sport: Skiing

Sara Gros Aspiroz (born 9 June 1983) is a Spanish ski mountaineer.

After good results in younger age classes, for example third place in the single race event of the 2002 World Championship of Ski Mountaineering, 2003 European "juniors" runner-up and 2004 European "espoirs" champion, she competed in the 2005 European Championship of Ski Mountaineering. Together with Cristina Bes Ginesta and Emma Roca Rodríguez she finished fifth in the relay event ("seniors" ranking).
