= Cédric Tomio =

French ski mountaineer

Personal information
- Born: 1969 (age 56–57)

Sport
- Sport: Skiing
Medal record
Men's ski mountaineering
Representing France
World Championships
Gold medal – first place	2004 Spain	Relay
European Championships
Silver medal – second place	2001 France	Team

Cédric Tomio (born 1969) is a French ski mountaineer.

== Selected results ==
- 1992:
  - 1st, European Cup (together with Thierry Bochet)
  - 1st, French Championship
- 1994:
  - 2nd, French Championship
- 1995:
  - 2nd, French Championship
- 2001:
  - 2nd, European Championship team race (together with Vincent Meilleur)
  - 2nd, European Cup
  - 2nd, French Championship
  - 3rd, Trophée des Gastlosen (European Cup, together with Vincent Meilleur)
  - 3rd, French national ranking
- 2002:
  - 1st, Trophée des Gastlosen (together with Vincent Meilleur)
  - 5th, World Championship single race
  - 5th, World Championship combination ranking
  - 6th, World Championship team race (together with Vincent Meilleur)
- 2003:
  - 8th, European Championship team race (together with Vincent Meilleur)
  - 9th, European Championship single race
  - 9th, European Championship combination ranking
- 2004:
  - 1st, World Championship relay race (together with Stéphane Brosse, Florent Perrier and Patrick Blanc)
  - 6th, World Championship (together with Vincent Meilleur)

=== Pierra Menta ===
- 2001: 3rd, together with Vincent Meilleur
- 2002: 4th, together with Vincent Meilleur
- 2003: 3rd, together with Vincent Meilleur
- 2004: 2nd, together with Vincent Meilleur

=== Trofeo Mezzalama ===
- 2003: 9th, together with Patrick Blanc and Tony Sbalbi
