= Sandra Zimmerli =

Swiss ski mountaineer (born 1965)

Personal information
- Born: 1965 (age 60–61)

Sport
- Sport: Skiing
Medal record
Women's ski mountaineering
Representing Switzerland
European Championships
Gold medal – first place	2001 France	Team

Sandra Zimmerli (born 1965) from Panex VD is a Swiss ski mountaineer and radio journalist.

Especially in teams with Catherine Mabillard she competed successfully in the 1990s and early 2000s (decade), before she had to withdraw from sports due to an injury. In 2009, she returned to competition ski mountaineering sports.

As a journalist she worked for Radio Chablais and currently for La 1ère.

== Selected results ==
- 1994:
  - 1st, Patrouille de la Maya A-course, together with Catherine Mabillard and Marika Ducret
- 1997:
  - 1st, Trophée du Muveran (together with Catherine Mabillard and Marianne Chapuisat)
  - 1st, ski marathon (together with Catherine Mabillard), Matterhorn, Zermatt
- 1998:
  - 1st and course record, Tour de Matterhorn (together with Catherine Mabillard and Cristina Favre-Moretti)
  - 1st, Super-Trophée du Muveran (together with Catherine Mabillard)
- 1999:
  - 1st, Alpiniski des Dents-du-Midi (together with Catherine Mabillard)
- 2001:
  - 1st, European Championship team race (together with Catherine Mabillard)
- 2009:
  - 3rd, Pila Race in the Sky at night (together with Catherine Mabillard)

=== Patrouille des Glaciers ===
- 1998: 1st and course record, together with Catherine Mabillard and Cristina Favre-Moretti
- 2000: 1st, together with Catherine Mabillard and Cristina Favre-Moretti
