= Feuerkogel =

Mountain in Upper Austria

- Mountain
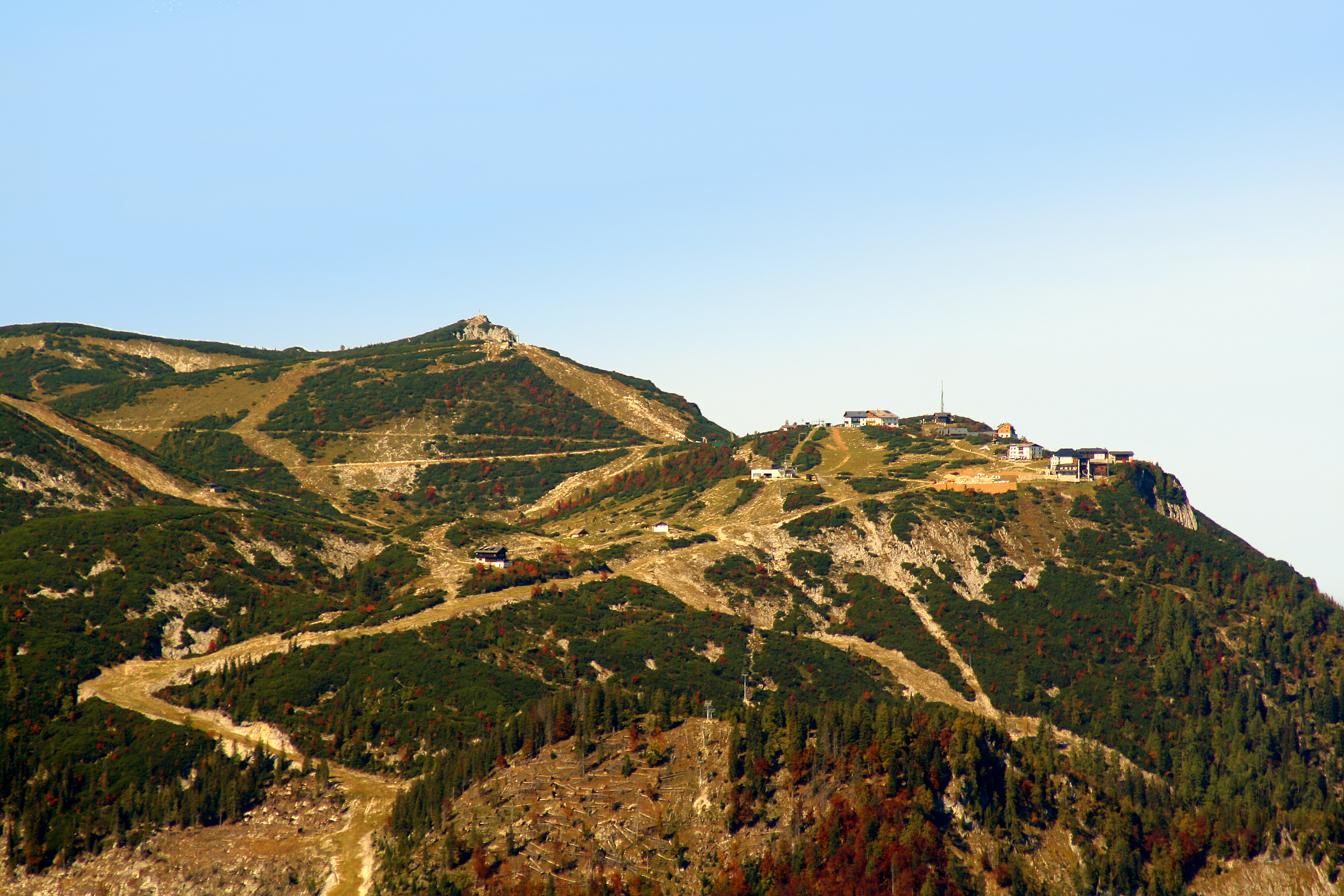

Highest point
- Elevation: 1,592 m (5,223 ft)
- Coordinates: 47°48′58.68″N 13°43′21.11″E

Geography
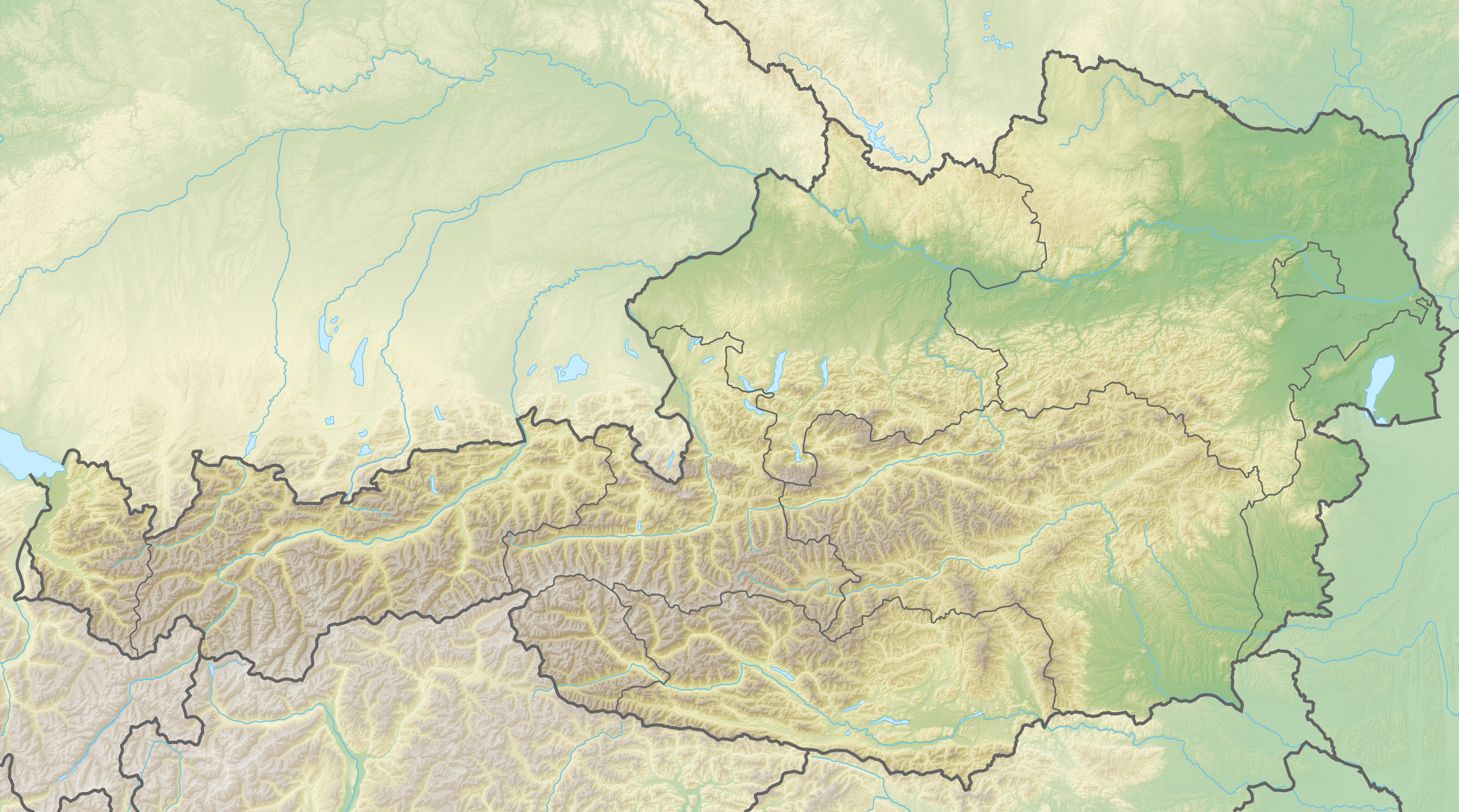
- Location: Upper Austria, Austria
- Parent range: Höllengebirge

Feuerkogel is a mountain located in Gmunden District and the state of Upper Austria, in the central part of the country, 200 km west of the capital Vienna. The summit of Feuerkogel is 1,592 meters above sea level. Feuerkogel forms the eastern end of the Höllengebirge, which stretches between Lake Attersee and Lake Traunsee and protrudes towards the southern shore of Lake Traunsee. Höllengebirge belongs to the Northern Limestone Alps.

The terrain around Feuerkogel is mountainous to the south, but to the north, it is hilly. The highest point nearby is Alberfeldkogel, 1,707 meters above sea level, 1.3 km west of Feuerkogel. The nearest major community is Ebensee, 4.3 km east of Feuerkogel.

== Vegetation ==
In the surroundings of Feuerkogel, primarily consists mixed coniferous forest. Around Feuerkogel, it is quite densely populated, with 65 inhabitants per square kilometer. The area is part of the hemiboreal climatic zone.

== Climate ==
The average annual temperature in the area is 6 °C. The warmest month is July, with an average temperature of 17 °C, and the coldest is January, with -8 °C. The average annual precipitation is 1,801 millimeters. The rainiest month is August, with an average of 213 mm of precipitation, and the driest is March, with 89 mm of precipitation.

Climate data for Feuerkogel (1991-2020, extremes 1961-2020)
Month	Jan	Feb	Mar	Apr	May	Jun	Jul	Aug	Sep	Oct	Nov	Dec	Year
Record high °C (°F)	13.4 (56.1)	16.4 (61.5)	14.5 (58.1)	19.4 (66.9)	24.0 (75.2)	26.8 (80.2)	28.2 (82.8)	27.5 (81.5)	26.6 (79.9)	22.7 (72.9)	20.2 (68.4)	15.7 (60.3)	28.2 (82.8)
Mean daily maximum °C (°F)	−0.1 (31.8)	−0.6 (30.9)	1.7 (35.1)	5.8 (42.4)	10.1 (50.2)	14.0 (57.2)	15.4 (59.7)	15.0 (59.0)	11.7 (53.1)	8.5 (47.3)	4.3 (39.7)	0.8 (33.4)	7.2 (45.0)
Daily mean °C (°F)	−2.8 (27.0)	−3.3 (26.1)	−1.0 (30.2)	2.8 (37.0)	7.2 (45.0)	10.7 (51.3)	12.5 (54.5)	12.8 (55.0)	8.8 (47.8)	5.9 (42.6)	1.6 (34.9)	−1.8 (28.8)	4.4 (39.9)
Mean daily minimum °C (°F)	−5.3 (22.5)	−6.4 (20.5)	−3.5 (25.7)	−0.1 (31.8)	3.9 (39.0)	7.4 (45.3)	8.9 (48.0)	9.1 (48.4)	6.0 (42.8)	2.9 (37.2)	−1.2 (29.8)	−4.3 (24.3)	1.4 (34.5)
Record low °C (°F)	−25.7 (−14.3)	−22.7 (−8.9)	−20.6 (−5.1)	−13.9 (7.0)	−7.8 (18.0)	−4.0 (24.8)	−0.4 (31.3)	−0.9 (30.4)	−4.2 (24.4)	−12.5 (9.5)	−18.4 (−1.1)	−22.6 (−8.7)	−25.7 (−14.3)
Average precipitation mm (inches)	138.2 (5.44)	110.9 (4.37)	151.2 (5.95)	105.2 (4.14)	171.6 (6.76)	201.7 (7.94)	230.8 (9.09)	202.8 (7.98)	175.6 (6.91)	130.2 (5.13)	126.3 (4.97)	144.7 (5.70)	1,889.2 (74.38)
Average precipitation days (≥ 1 mm)	13.7	13.5	15.7	11.7	15.3	16.0	16.4	13.6	13.0	12.3	12.6	14.9	168.7
Average relative humidity (%) (at 7:00 CET)	73	75	77	79	79	83	81	81	79	70	74	73	77
Mean monthly sunshine hours	104.8	110.6	141.2	173.7	185.4	176.5	195.6	201.7	155.6	148.3	107.4	95.8	1,796.6
Source 1: NOAA
Source 2: Deutscher Wetterdienst (extremes, humidity 1961–1990)

== Tourism ==
Since 1927, a cable car has been running from Ebensee up to the mountain to the Feuerkogel hotel. The cable car facilitates hiking access to get up to the mountain and thus enables tours to Großer Höllkogel or crossing the Höllengebirge to Hochleckenhaus, including the intermediate station Rieder Hütte. As early as 1936, there was a ski lift for about 8 people. Today, however, there are lift facilities totaling 12 kilometers to the ski slopes. A very demanding 6 km long ungroomed descent leads directly from the mountain down to the built-up area at Ebense.

== Arrangement ==
On the occasion of the 80th birthday of the cable car, a big party and a traditional Nostalgia ski race were held between March 3 and 4, 2007. The sporting highlight is the Feuerkogel Mountain Race, which takes place every August. It is the most popular mountain race in Austria. In 1997, the European Mountain Running Championships were held.

== Wind measurements ==
On December 26, 1999, the highest wind speed ever measured in Austria, 220 km/h, was recorded on the summit of the Feuerkogel. Due to its altitude, the wind measuring station on the Feuerkogel continues to register record-breaking values. During Cyclone Kyrill in January 2007, Austria experienced its highest wind speed from the cyclone, measured at 207 km/h. This event further emphasizes the ongoing record-breaking wind speeds observed by the Feuerkogel's wind measuring station, attributable to its high elevation.
