= Martial Premat =

French ski mountaineer

Personal information
- Born: 24 February 1977 (age 49)

Sport
- Sport: Skiing
Medal record
Representing France

Martial Premat (born 24 February 1977) is a French ski mountaineer.

== Selected results ==
- 2006:
  - 7th, World Championship team race (together with Didier Blanc)
- 2007:
  - 8th, European Championship team race (together with Fabien Anselmet)
- 2008:
  - 4th, World Championship relay race (together with Nicolas Bonnet, Sébastien Perrier and Adrien Piccot)
  - 10th, World Championship team race (together with Nicolas Bonnet)
- 2009:
  - 5th, European Championship relay race (together with Didier Blanc, Nicolas Bonnet and Tony Sbalbi)

=== Patrouille des Glaciers ===
- 2006: 6th, ("seniors II" ranking), together with Stéphane Millius and Antoine Gaidon
- 2008: 9th (and 7th in the "international men" ranking), together with Philippe Blanc and Yannick Buffet

=== Pierra Menta ===
- 2004: 9th, together with Jean-François Premat
- 2005: 7th, together with Stéphane Chevallier
- 2006: 10th, together with Philippe Blanc
