= 2008 World Championship of Ski Mountaineering =

The 2008 World Championship of Ski Mountaineering was the fourth World Championship of Ski Mountaineering sanctioned by the International Council for Ski Mountaineering Competitions (ISMC), held in Portes du Soleil, Switzerland, from February 23 to February 29, 2008.

About 450 athletes of 29 nations participated. Compared to the former world masterships a long distance race was added.

== Results ==
=== Nation ranking and medals ===
(without long distance ranking; all age groups)

ranking	country	individual				relay				team				vertical race				
ranking	country	points				points				points				points				total points
1	Italy	3235	3	3	3	722	1	1		1212	1	1	1	1920	3	3	1	7089
2	France	3176	3	3	1	638			2	1182	1			1935	3		3	6931
3	Switzerland	3236		2	3	770	2	1		1068		1	1	1833		4	2	6907
4	Spain	2627	2			642		1	1	588				1660	2		2	5487
5	Czech Republic	1426				314				378				767		1		2885
6	Germany	1253				346				498				750				2847
7	Andorra	1285				198				438				816				2737
8	Norway	852				442				684				624				2592
9	Slovakia	1629				192								769				2590
10	Austria	1382				216				168				578				2344
11	Sweden	874				186				324				599				1983
12	Poland	915			1	324				174				394				1807
13	United Kingdom	680				162				246				563				1651
14	United States	648				156				210				346				1360
15	Slovenia	584				168								403				1155
16	Greece	490				150				114				238				992
17	Argentina	406								12				218				636
18	Chile	248				144				12				153				557
19	Canada	345												166				511
20	Bulgaria	297												166				463
21	New Zealand	210												106				316
22	China	280																280
23	Japan	141								18				100				259
24	South Korea	129												88				217
25	Liechtenstein	21												86				107
26	Belgium	66																66
27	Romania																	
27	Venezuela																	

=== Individual ===
Event held in Valerette on February 24, 2008

- starting point: Les Cerniers/Monthey
- altitude difference:
  - ascent: 1,650m
  - downhill: 1,650m

List of the best 10 participants by gender (incl. "Espoirs" level):

==== Women ====
ranking	participant	total time
	Roberta Pedranzini	01h 51' 48"
	Laëtitia Roux	01h 53' 30"
	Francesca Martinelli	01h 55' 59"
4	Nathalie Etzensperger	01h 56' 49"
5	Gloriana Pellissier	01h 57' 26"
6	Séverine Pont-Combe	02h 01' 02"
7	Izaskun Zubizarreta	02h 05' 26"
8	Ariadna Tudel Cuberes	02h 07' 24"
9	Stefanie Koch	02h 08' 06"
10	Lydia Prugger	02h 08' 56"

==== Men ====
ranking	participant	total time
	Florent Perrier	01h 30' 03"
	Florent Troillet	01h 32' 13"
	Dennis Brunod	01h 32' 32"
4	Andreas Ringhofer	01h 33' 13"
5	Grégory Gachet	01h 35' 14"
6	Yannick Buffet	01h 35' 15"
7	Alexander Lugger	01h 35' 17"
8	Manfred Reichegger	01h 35' 20"
9	Marc Solá Pastoret	01h 35' 27"
10	Pierre Bruchez	01h 35' 28"

=== Relay ===
event held in Morgins on February 25, 2008

- altitude difference (ascent): 260m

List of the best 10 relay teams by gender (some teams included "Espoirs" level athletes):

==== Women ====
ranking	team	total time
	Nathalie Etzensperger/Gabrielle Magnenat/Marie Troillet/Séverine Pont-Combe	01h 28' 54"
	Gloriana Pellissier/Francesca Martinelli/Elisa Fleischmann/Roberta Pedranzini	01h 32' 31"
	Corinne Favre/Valentine Fabre/Véronique Lathuraz/Nathalie Bourillon	01h 34' 54"
4	Lene Pedersen/Ellen Blom/Bodil Ryste/Marit Tveite Bystøl	01h 38' 27"
5	Cristina Bes Ginesta/Gemma Arró Ribot/Izaskun Zubizarreta/Emma Roca Rodríguez	02h 04' 18"

==== Men ====
ranking	team	total time
	Dennis Brunod/Manfred Reichegger/Denis Trento/Martin Riz	00h 58' 59"
	Pierre Bruchez/Martin Anthamatten/Florent Troillet/Didier Moret	01h 00' 14"
	Javier Martín de Villa/Manuel Pérez Brunicardi/Marc Solá Pastoret/Kílian Jornet Burgada	01h 02' 01"
4	Nicolas Bonnet/Martial Premat/Sébastien Perrier/Adrien Piccot	01h 02' 36"
5	Martin Bader/Andreas Kalß/Andreas Fischbacher/Alexander Lugger	01h 05' 10"
6	Toni Steurer/Andreas Strobel/Stefan Klinger/Konrad Lex	01h 06' 32"
7	Ola Berger/Ove-Erik Tronvoll/Ola Herje Hovdenak/Ole-Jakob Sande	01h 07' 10"
8	Xavier Comas Guixé/Xavier Capdevila Romero/Joan Vilana Díaz/Joan Albós Cavaliere	01h 07' 34"
9	Peter Svätojánsky/Miroslav Leitner/Jozef Hlavco/Juraj Laštík	01h 07' 36"
10	Patrik Nordin/André Jonsson/Björn Gund/John Bergstedt	01h 08' 34"

=== Team ===
event held in Pointe de l'Au on February 26, 2008

- altitude difference:
  - ascent: 1,940m
  - downhill: 2,125m

List of the best 10 relay teams by gender (some teams included "Espoirs" level athletes):

==== Women ====
ranking	team	total time
	Martinelli/Pedranzini	02h 23' 53"
	Etzensperger/Pont-Combe	02h 25' 43"
	Magnenat/Mabillard	02h 31' 35"
4	Favre/Bourillon	02h 32' 33"
5	Fabre/Lathuraz	02h 37' 18"
6	Koch/Graßl	02h 38' 26"
7	Zubizarreta/Roca Rodríguez	02h 38' 51"
8	Pedersen/Tveite Bystøl	02h 46' 36"
9	T. Lunger/Cuminetti	02h 46' 55"
10	Hook/Vikberg	02h 49' 59"

==== Men ====
ranking	team	total time
	F. Perrier/Pellicier	01h 55' 40"
	H. Lunger/Giacomelli	01h 56' 16"
	Brunod/Reichegger	01h 56' 17"
4	Gachet/Bon Mardion	02h 00' 18"
5	Martín de Villa/J. Bes Ginesta	02h 03' 24"
6	D. Blanc/P. Blanc	02h 03 47"
7	Murada/Holzknecht	02h 05' 25"
8	Marti/Willy	02h 05' 55"
9	Berger/Hovdenak	02h 06' 51"
10	Bonnet/Premat	02h 07' 06"

=== Vertical race ===
event held on February 28, 2008

- altitude difference (ascent): 870m

List of the best 10 participants by gender (incl. "Espoirs" level):

==== Women ====
ranking	participant	total time
	Roberta Pedranzini	00h 43' 39"
	Francesca Martinelli	00h 44' 49"
	Nathalie Etzensperger	00h 45' 08"
4	Lydia Prugger	00h 45' 19"
5	Corinne Favre	00h 45' 23"
6	Véronique Lathuraz	00h 45' 26"
7	Ariadna Tudel Cuberes	00h 45' 30"
8	Laëtitia Roux	00h 45' 59"
9	Sophie Dusautoir Bertrand	00h 46' 27"
10	Gloriana Pellissier	00h 47' 16"

==== Men ====
ranking	participant	total time
	Florent Perrier	00h 35' 04"
	Dennis Brunod	00h 35' 42"
	Grégory Gachet	00h 35' 49"
4	Kílian Jornet Burgada	00h 35' 54"
5	Manfred Reichegger	00h 36' 06"
6	Agustí Roc Amador	00h 36' 31"
7	Sébastien Epiney	00h 36' 35"
8	Florent Troillet	00h 37' 05"
9	Ola Berger	00h 37' 10"
10	Alexandre Pellicier	00h 37' 17"

=== Long distance ===
event held on February 29, 2008

- altitude difference
  - ascent (men / women): 3,200m / 2,500m
  - downhill (men / women): 3,200m / 2,700m

List of the best 10 participants by gender:

==== Women ====
ranking	participant	total time
	Francesca Martinelli	03h 15' 10"
	Gabrielle Magnenat	03h 16' 51"
	Nathalie Etzensperger	03h 21' 11"
4	Catherine Mabillard	03h 25' 20"
5	Nathalie Bourillon	03h 26' 30"
6	Veronika Swidrak	03h 31' 02"
7	Véronique Lathuraz	03h 32' 04"
8	Corinne Favre	03h 33' 38"
9	Izaskun Zubizarreta	03h 36' 36"
10	Emma Roca Rodríguez	03h 38' 44"

==== Men ====
ranking	participant	total time
	Guido Giacomelli	02h 54' 48"
	Florent Perrier	02h 57' 47"
	Kílian Jornet Burgada	02h 58' 38"
4	Florent Troillet	03h 00' 53"
5	Peter Svätojánsky	03h 01' 09"
6	Alexander Lugger	03h 01' 53"
7	Hansjörg Lunger	03h 05' 52"
8	Tony Sbalbi	03h 05' 55"
9	Marc Solá Pastoret	03h 05' 57"
10	Didier Moret	03h 06' 01"

=== Combination ranking ===
(vertical race, individual and team ranking)

List of the best 10 participants by gender:

==== Women ====
ranking	participant
	Roberta Pedranzini
	Francesca Martinelli
	Nathalie Etzensperger
4	Izaskun Zubizarreta
5	Marit Tveite Bystøl
6	Martina Hook
7	Lene Pedersen
8	Josefina Vikberg
9	Séverine Pont-Combe
10	Corinne Favre

==== Men ====
ranking	participant
	Florent Perrier
	Dennis Brunod
	Grégory Gachet
4	Alexandre Pellicier
5	Manfred Reichegger
6	Ola Berger
7	Javier Martín de Villa
8	Johann Wieland
9	Florent Troillet
10	Toni Steurer
