= Rolf Majcen =

Austrian lawyer, writer and extreme sports athlete (born 1966)

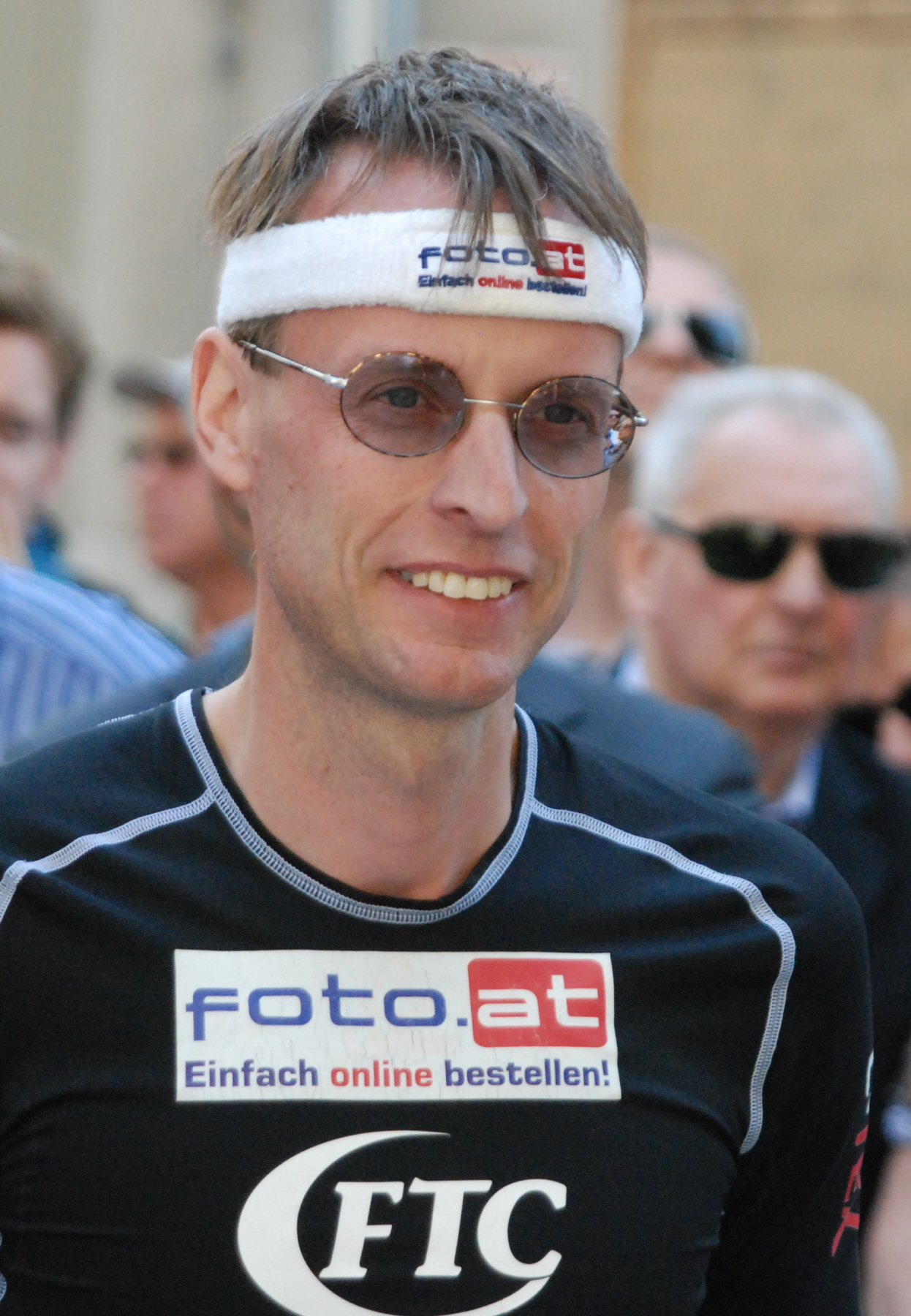
Rolf Majcen, 2012

Rolf Majcen (born 1966) is a Lower Austrian economist-lawyer, writer and extreme sports athlete.

== Biography ==
Majcen was born in Johannesburg. He is the grandnephew of Karl Majcen, the former General-Inspector of the Austrian Bundesheer. He earned a doctoral degree in law and served as an officer in the Bundesheer from 1985 to 1998. While serving in the Bundesheer he completed air rescuer and army mountain guide assistant training.

Majcen published several juridical economy and sports contributions in Europe, America and Asia. His first book Sieg in den Bergen (victory in the mountains), published in 2002, was awarded by the Union Internationale des Associations d'Alpinisme (UIAA). He also took part in several sports competitions. He was the first Austrian, who competed in all the three classical ski mountaineering events, the Patrouille des Glaciers (2000 and 2004), the Pierra Menta (2001) and the Trofeo Mezzalama (2003). In 2004, Majcen and Hermann Kofler were the first Austrian athletes who gained World Cup points in ski mountaineering for their country.

== Selected results ==
=== Ski mountaineering ===
- 2002:
  - 7th, International Vlado-Tatarka memory race, Hrebienok (together with Franz Hausmann)
- 2004:
  - 1st, Lower Austrian Championship
  - 6th, International Turnosmučarski-Rallye, Triglav National Park (together with Franz Hausmann)
  - 7th and Austrian record, Patrouille des Glaciers "seniors II" class ranking (together with Hermann Kofler and Johann Wieland)
- 2005:
  - 1st, Lower Austrian Championship
- 2007:
  - 1st, Lower Austrian Championship

=== Stair running ===
- 1st, Judenburg-tower race
- 1999:
  - 1st, Royal Mutual Funds CN Tower Stair Climb, Toronto
- 2000:
  - 8th, Empire State Building Run Up
- 2001:
  - 1st, Magdeburger Uni-Hochhaus race, Magdeburg
  - 9th, Empire State Building Run Up
  - 14th, Ostankino Tower race
- 2002:
  - 2nd, Original Schlossberg race
  - 3rd, Donauturm race
- 2007:
  - 5th, Donauturm race
- 2008:
  - 3rd, Frankfurt Messeturm race
  - 6th, Donauturm race
  - 7th, "Go Vertical Chicago", Sears Tower
  - 7th, "Hustle up the Hankock", John Hancock Center
  - 12th, Taipei 101 race
