= 2004 World Championship of Ski Mountaineering =

The 2004 World Championship of Ski Mountaineering was the second World Championship of Ski Mountaineering sanctioned by the International Council for Ski Mountaineering Competitions (ISMC), held in the Spanish Aran Valley (Catalonia) from March 1 to March 6, 2004.

Compared to the 2002 World Championship a relay race and a vertical race competition was added.

== Results ==
=== Nation ranking and medals ===
(all age groups)

ranking	country	vertical race				team				individual				relay				
ranking	country	points				points				points				points				total points
1	Switzerland	501	2	2	1	466	1	1		1378	3		2	364	1		1	2709
2	Italy	469	2	2	4	436		1	1	1390	1	1	1	344		1	1	2639
3	France	351	1	1		460	1		1	1255		1	1	380	1	1		2446
4	Spain	350	1		1	222				1018		1		296				1886
5	Czech Republic	286				134				453				280				1153
6	Slovakia	252		1		114				582				144				1092
7	Germany	268				224				320				120				932
8	Slovenia	160				78				425				140				803
9	Andorra	151				104				150				132				537
10	Romania	55				28				290				136				509
11	Greece	142				42				193				116				493
12	Poland					68				298		1		124				490
13	Austria	148				64				147								359
14	Japan	109				14				64				112				299
15	Bulgaria	56				34				186								276
16	United States	146								128								274
17	United Kingdom	127				14				58								199
18	Denmark	121				18				53								192
19	Canada	95								75								170
20	Liechtenstein	82								74								156
21	Russia	70				16				53								139
22	Argentina	68				12				45								125
23	China	89																89
24	Morocco	61								8								69
25	Eritrea	60																60
26	Chile	34				2				14								50
27	South Korea	27								9								36
28	Belgium									30								30
29	Croatia	26																26

=== Vertical race ===
event held on March 2, 2004

altitude difference (ascent): 950m

List of the best 10 participants by gender (incl. "Espoirs" level):

==== Women ====
ranking	participant	total time
	Favre-Moretti	00h 48' 21"
	Isabella Crettenand-Moretti	00h 50' 13"
	Gloriana Pellissier	00h 50' 56"
4	Corinne Favre	00h 52' 26"
5	Jeannie Wall	00h 53' 22"
6	Annamaria Baudena	00h 54' 34"
7	Marie Troillet	00h 56' 13"
8	Christine Echtler-Schleich	00h 56' 51"
9	Lucie Oršulová	00h 57' 28"
10	Maria Luisa Riva	00h 57' 45"

==== Men ====
ranking	participant	total time
	Patrick Blanc	00h 40' 27"
	Florent Perrier	00h 40' 51"
	Sébastien Epiney	00h 41' 27"
4	Jean Pellissier	00h 41' 47"
5	Olivier Nägele	00h 41' 49"
6	Andreas Ringhofer	00h 43' 00"
7	Manuel Pérez Brunicardi	00h 43' 08"
8	Martin Riz	00h 43' 39"
9	Jean-Yves Rey	00h 43' 49"
10	Javier Martín de Villa	00h 44' 07"

=== Team ===
Event held on March 3, 2004

altitude difference:

- ascent: 2,128m
- downhill: 2,128m

List of the best 10 teams by gender:

==== Women ====
ranking	team	total time
	Favre-Moretti/Mabillard	03h 05' 43"
	Bapst/Crettenand-Moretti	03h 18' 50"
	Corinne Favre/Toïgo	03h 20' 25"
4	Oggeri/Ducognon	03h 20' 41"
5	Bourillon/Lathuraz	03h 21' 03"
6	Nex/Riva	03h 24' 36"
7	Rogger/Renzler	03h 25' 23"
8	Magnenat/Zimmermann	03h 42' 17"
9	Echtler-Schleich/Treimer	03h 45' 59"
10	Roca Rodríguez/C. Bes Ginesta	03h 55' 04"

==== Men ====
ranking	team	total time
	P. Blanc/Perrier	02h 31' 54"
	Battel/Pellissier	02h 33' 19"
	Brunod/Reichegger	02h 34' 45"
4	J.-Y. Rey/Epiney	02h 37' 18"
5	Hug/Pittex	02h 38' 35"
6	Meilleur/Tomio	02h 39' 25"
7	Leitner/Svätojánsky	02h 39' 59"
8	Giacomelli/Mezzanotte	02h 40' 22"
9	Lugger/Ringhofer	02h 41' 53"
10	Taramarcaz/F. Troillet	02h 43' 38"

=== Individual ===
Event held on March 5, 2004

- distance: ~ 20 km
- altitude difference:
  - ascent: 1,720m
  - downhill: 1,720m

List of the best 10 participants by gender (incl. "Espoirs" level):

==== Women ====
ranking	participant	total time
	Cristina Favre-Moretti	02h 21' 55"
	Gloriana Pellissier	02h 30' 10"
	Isabella Crettenand-Moretti	02h 31' 57"
4	Catherine Mabillard	02h 33' 05"
5	Delphine Oggeri	02h 35' 18"
6	Nathalie Bourillon	02h 35' 52"
7	Véronique Lathuraz	02h 35' 53"
8	Maria Luisa Riva	02h 39(+3)' 01"
9	Marie Troillet	02h 43' 09"
10	Corinne Favre	02h 44' 15"

==== Men ====
ranking	participant	total time
	Rico Elmer	02h 00' 38"
	Florent Perrier	02h 01' 03"
	Dennis Brunod	02h 01' 19"
4	Manfred Reichegger	02h 02' 11"
5	Alexander Lugger	02h 02' 22"
6	Patrick Blanc	02h 03' 31"
7	Grégory Gachet	02h 05' 50"
8	Olivier Nägele	02h 05' 06"
9	Taramarcaz	02h 06' 16"
10	Jean Pellissier	02h 06' 18"

=== Relay ===
Event held on March 6, 2004

List of the best 10 relay teams by gender (some teams included "Espoirs" level athletes):

==== Women ====
ranking	team	Gesamtzeit
	Isabella Crettenand-Moretti/Catherine Mabillard/Cristina Favre-Moretti	00h 46' 02"
	Nathalie Bourillon/Véronique Lathuraz/Delphine Oggeri	00h 47' 16"
	Annamaria Baudena/Christiane Nex/Gloriana Pellissier	00h 49' 21"
4	Alice Korbová/Kamila Bulířová/Lucie Oršulová	00h 50' 45"
5	Emma Roca Rodríguez/Cristina Bes Ginesta/Iolanda García Sàez	00h 52' 25"

==== Men ====
ranking	team	total time
	Stéphane Brosse/Cédric Tomio/Florent Perrier/Patrick Blanc	00h 49' 33"
	Carlo Battel/Graziano Boscacci/Martin Riz/Guido Giacomelli	00h 49' 43"
	Alexander Hug/Alain Richard/Pierre Bruchez/Rico Elmer	00h 51' 46"
4	Agustí Roc Amador/Javier Martín de Villa/Dani León Roca/Manuel Pérez Brunicardi	00h 52' 44"
5	Miroslav Leitner/Branislav Kačina/Milan Madaj/Peter Svätojánsky	00h 53' 17"
6	Tone Karničar/Jernej Karničar/Žiga Karničar/Marko Lihteneker	00h 56' 44"
7	Ionuţ Găliţeanu/Silviu Manea/Péter Károly/Lucian Clinciu	00h 57' 35"
8	Joan Vilana Díaz/Manel Pelegrina Lopez/Xavier Capdevila Romero/Toni Casals Rueda	00h 57' 44"
9	Jaroslav Bánský/Tomáš Němec/Michal Němec/Miroslav Duch	00h 58' 23"
10	Jakub Brzosko/Grzegorz Bargiel/Adam Gomola/Maciej Ziarko	00h 58' 45"
11	Toni Steurer/Tim Stachel/Gerhard Reithmeier/Stefan Klinger	00h 54(+6)' 15"

=== Combination ranking ===
(individual, team, vertical race rankings)

List of the best 10 participants by gender:

==== Women ====
ranking	participant
	Cristina Favre-Moretti
	Catherine Mabillard
	Isabella Crettenand-Moretti
4	Delphine Oggeri
5	Nathalie Bourillon
6	Véronique Lathuraz
7	Corinne Favre
8	Maria Luisa Riva
9	Astrid Renzler
10	Silvia Treimer

==== Men ====
ranking	participant
	Florent Perrier
	Patrick Blanc
	Dennis Brunod
4	Manfred Reichegger
5	Jean Pellissier
6	Alexander Lugger
7	Peter Svätojánsky
8	Pierre-Marie Taramarcaz
9	Miroslav Leitner
10	Christian Pittex
