= Nicolas Bonnet (ski mountaineer) =

French ski mountaineer and alpine guide

Personal information
- Born: 6 November 1984 (age 41) Briançon, France
- Height: 168 cm (5 ft 6 in)

Sport
- Sport: Skiing
- Club: Team Ecrins Hautes-Alpes
Medal record
Representing France

Nicolas Bonnet (born 6 November 1984) is a French ski mountaineer, runner, mountain guide and coach of the national team.

Bonnet was born in Briançon. He started ski mountaineering in 1998 and competed first in 2002. He holds several national titles in different age classes. In 2006, he was also 2006 "junior" class World champion of vertical race, and placed 1st in the "junior" class at the Patrouille des Glaciers as well as at the short distance race of the Pierra Menta. On 12 April 2007 he broke his own course record on the Pelvoux course with a total time of 3 hours 18 minutes. Together with the Germans Benedikt Böhm and Sebastian Haag he planned a speed ski mountaineering tour on the Manaslu, but had to withdraw due to the bad weather conditions and danger of avalanches. He is member of the Team Ecrins Hautes-Alpes and belongs to the national selection since 2007.

== Selected results ==
- 2008:
  - 4th, World Championship relay race (together with Martial Premat, Sébastien Perrier and Adrien Piccot)
  - 10th, World Championship team race (together with Martial Premat)
- 2009:
  - 5th, European Championship relay race (together with Didier Blanc, Martial Premat and Tony Sbalbi)
  - 7th, Pierra Menta (together with William Bon Mardion)
- 2011:
  - 6th, World Championship team race (together with Alexis Sévennec-Verdier)
  - 8th, World Championship sprint
