= Mary-Jérôme Vaudan =

Swiss ski mountaineer (born 1965)

Mary-Jérôme Vaudan (born 1965) from Bagnes-Montagnier is a Swiss ski mountaineer, long-distance runner and marathon mountain biker.

== Selected results ==
=== Ski mountaineering ===
- 2004:
  - 1st, Patrouille de la Maya A-course, together with Chantal Daucourt and Véronique Ançay
- 2005:
  - 1st (juniors), Trophée des Gastlosen, together with Chantal Daucourt
- 2008:
  - 1st, Patrouille de la Maya A-course, together with Anne Bochatay and Véronique Ançay
- 2011:
  - 10th, Trofeo Mezzalama, together with Valérie Berthod-Pellissier and Véronique Ançay

=== Patrouille des Glaciers ===
- 2004: 3rd, together with Véronique Ançay and Chantal Daucourt
- 2008: 5th, together with Anne Bochatay and Véronique Ançay
- 2010: 6th, together with Véronique Ançay-Carron and Valérie Berthod-Pellissier

=== Running ===
- 2010: 3rd, Trail Verbier-St Bernard - "La Traversée", 61 km
- 2011: 1st, Trail Verbier-St Bernard - "La Traversée", 61 km

=== Mountain biking ===
- 2003: 3rd, Grand Raid Cristalp, 131 km
- 2007: 3rd (women 1), Grand Raid Cristalp, 121 km (Verbier - Grimentz)
