= Jeanine Bapst =

Swiss ski mountaineer

Personal information
- Born: September 11, 1968 (age 57)

Sport
- Sport: Skiing
Medal record
Ski mountaineering
Representing Switzerland
World Championships
Silver medal – second place	2004 World Championship	Team

Jeanine Bapst (born September 11, 1968) is a Swiss ski mountaineer.

== Selected results ==
- 2001:
  - 2nd, Swiss Cup, scratch
- 2003:
  - 2nd, Trophée des Gastlosen, together with Maroussia Rusca
- 2004:
  - 2nd, World Championship team race (together with Isabella Crettenand-Moretti)
  - 3rd, Trophée des Gastlosen, together with Marie Troillet
- 2006:
  - 3rd, Trophée des Gastlosen, together with Gabrielle Magnenat

=== Patrouille des Glaciers ===
- 2000: 4th, together with Hélène Romagnoli and Ingrid Maret
- 2004: 2nd, together with Andréa Zimmermann and Gabrielle Magnenat

=== Pierra Menta ===
- 2003: 7th, together with Annick Rey
- 2005: 5th, together with Andréa Zimmermann
