= Austrian Federal Sports Organization =

- Jurisdiction: Austria
- Headquarters: Innsbruck
- President: LH a.D. Hans Niessl

Official website
- www.bso.or.at

The Austrian Federal Sports Organization (German: Österreichische Bundes-Sportorganisation, BSO) is the Austrian Federal Government department responsible for the promotion of sports. It administers the means of promoting elite-level sports, and distributes these to its members.

It generally consists of two kinds of members:

- Professional associations - those are the country wide unions of individual sport associations of a kind of sport
- Governing bodies - those are the sports organizations of the individual political parties

== History ==
- 1946 Austria in the reconstruction: ASKÖ and SPORTUNION lay the basis for the association sport after the war
- 1949 Foundation of the Federal Sports Council and the Federal Council of Experts, "12-point-claims program" for the formulation of a state sports promotion, introduction of the sports photo
- 1953 experts draft a resolution establishing a legally protected BSO
- 1961 The House of Sports is opened
- 1964 Trade and Sports Council join forces to found an executive committee
- 1967 The BSO office is established in the House of Sports, the first official sports calendar is published
- 1968 Fachrat and Sportrat adopt the statutes of the BSO
- 1969 On April 26, the solemn founding meeting of the BSO takes place in the Vienna City Hall
- 1971 Premiere for the Fit-Run and Fit-March, founding of the Sporthilfe
- 1973 Organization of the first European Sports Conference in Vienna
- 1974 Introduction of state coaching and teaching training
- 1976 Foundation of the VMSB (later IMSB)
- 1977 Introduction of the cycling day, action "Sport active"
- 1980 Introduction of the festival, action "Wanderbares Österreich"
- 1982 The BSO agrees with the Armed Forces on the issue of HSNS, the club decree on sports-friendly taxation of sports clubs is enforced
- 1986 The Toto is integrated into the Austrian lotteries
- 1990 establishment of the top sports committee, adoption of the sports facility law, establishment of an anti-doping committee
- 1995 Austria organizes together with Hungary the 12th European Sports Conference in Vienna and Budapest
- 1999 School and sports club want to cooperate even closer in the future
- 2000 The results of the study "Sport 2000" lay the foundation for the work priorities in the next millennium
- 2001 The studies "Sport & Health - A Socio-Economic Analysis", "The Economic Importance of Sport" and the "Volunteer Study" prove the enormous economic importance of sport and sports clubs.

== Organs and bodies ==
The BSO has the following bodies:

- Austrian Sports Assembly
- Austrian Sports Council
- Austrian sports council
- Top Sports Committee
- Presidium
- BSO sports youth
- Auditors

President has been BM a.D. Rudolf Hundstorfer.

== Members ==
Ordinary and extraordinary members are organized in the BSO. There are also supportive and honorary members.

'Full members:'

- Grassroots sports associations
- Sports associations
- Gesamtösterr. Organizations with special tasks in sport
- 'Extraordinary members'

'Supporting Members' may be natural or legal persons who support the Austrian sport, such as: B. funding agencies of Austrian sports or sports science institutes.

At the request of the Presidium, the Austrian Sports Assembly may appoint natural persons who have acquired special merits for all-Austrian sports and in particular for the BSO as "honorary members". The honorary membership can also be combined with an honorary function.

== Structure ==
Matters of sport fall into the constitutional competence of the federal states. The Confederation primarily carries out a funding competence based on Article 17 of the Federal Constitutional Law ("Private Business Administration"). The federal government's Sports Promotion Act forms the basis of federal sports funding.

=== State area ===
In the state sector, the Federal Ministry of Defense and Sport and the Federal Ministry of Education and the Federal Ministry of Science, Research and Economy are responsible for the various tasks of the sport at federal level. In addition, individual sports-specific subject areas can also fall into the area of competence of other federal ministries (such as Youth & Sport, Violence prevention at major sporting events, etc.).

Since, according to Article 15 B-VG, agendas of sport fall within the constitutional sphere of action of the federal states, nine regional sports directorates are also established.

=== Non-governmental area ===
The Austrian Federal Sports Organization is the non-governmental umbrella organization of the Austrian sport and coordinates matters of sport with the responsible state agencies. The regular members of the BSO are the three umbrella organizations ASKÖ, ASVÖ and Sportunion, which currently has 60 recognized trade associations as well as the Austrian Disabled Sports Association, the Austrian Olympic Committee, the Austrian Paralympic Committee and the Special Olympics. Extraordinary members are the provinces, as far as they declare their membership as well as all-Austrian associations of special importance (e.g. Österr. Betriebsssportverband, Österr. Heeressportverband, etc.). The full members have the right to vote in the individual committees of the BSO, such as the Austrian Sports Assembly, the Austrian Sports Council and the Austrian Sports Council.

== Focus ==
=== Service and advice ===
The BSO offers its members a wide range of services. In addition to support in terms of subsidy billing, the BSO office advises its members in a variety of topics. The personal consulting activities of the BSO office are complemented by regular training courses offered by external experts.

=== Further education ===
The Austrian Federal Sports Organization, in cooperation with the Ministry of Sport and the Federal Sports Academy, offers training programs in sports club management and coaching within Austrian sports. The athletic results of local athletes are attributed to the work of officials in clubs and associations, as well as trained coaches. The continuing education and training programs of the BSO aim to provide functionaries, staff, and trainers working in Austrian sports the opportunity to develop their skills.

=== Sport in the EU and International ===
Giving sport a voice not only nationally but also internationally is a goal that has been pursued by the BSO for many years. The partnership with the EU Office of the European Olympic Committees ensures an exchange of information and a strong representation of sport among decision-makers and institutions in Brussels.

=== Social and society ===
A central topic of the work and the tasks of the BSO is the aspect "social responsibility and social policy". The BSO sees the need for issues such as inclusion and inclusion, the protection of children and adolescents, the greening of sport in terms of sustainability, gender equality in sport, as well as the invaluable voluntary commitment, without which organized sport in this form is not exist, create awareness and use sport as a positive multiplier.

The initiative for the "Daily Gymnastics lesson" 2012/13 was also a successful move to draw attention to the health of the children. With more than 150,000 supporters it was possible to raise awareness of the importance of daily exercise units for children and adolescents. The BSO was able to reach a broad public with this initiative.

=== Media cooperations and events ===
Cooperations with the media, companies and initiatives are a central part of sports advocacy for the BSO. In order to be able to best represent the member associations and various sports, the BSO is committed to promoting the values and concerns of sport through partnerships, campaigns and events to communicate to a broad public.

=== BSO Cristall Gala ===
At the BSO Cristall Gala, Austria's best coaches, officials, sports clubs and sports ambassadors are awarded each year by the BSO in cooperation with the Ministry of Sport. There is also a women's power award. All member associations of the BSO and their associations are entitled to nominate personalities and projects that meet the requirements for the respective categories.
