= Marianne Chapuisat =

Swiss mountaineer (born 1969)

Marianne Chapuisat (born 17 January 1969) is a Swiss mountaineer. Chapuisat is recognized as being the first woman to summit an eight-thousander in the winter season.

== Background ==
Chapuisat was born in Vevey, Switzerland on 17 January 1969. At age 17, she joined a local alpine club and began mountaineering.

In 1991, Chapuisat summited Aconcagua, her highest summit to date.

On 10 February 1993, Chapuisat successfully summitted Cho Oyu, becoming the first woman to summit one of world's highest peaks during the winter season. It would take 25 years before another woman would match her accomplishment, when Elisabeth Revol summited Nanga Parbat in 2018.

Chapuisat later described her successful summit as "beginner's luck", as she considered herself only a part time mountaineer. It would be several years before she returned to the Himalayas. In 2000, she attempted to be the first Swiss woman to summit Mount Everest. Chapuisat had to turn back 180 meters from the summit due to poor weather.

In 2003, Chapuisat summited Gasherbrum II and Gasherbrum I. In 2005, she summited Nanga Parbat. Chapuisat completed all of her four summits alpine-style, without using supplemental oxygen or high altitude porters.
