= Martin Echtler =

German ski mountaineer

Personal information
- Born: 14 January 1969 (age 57) Peiting, Germany

Sport
- Sport: Skiing
Medal record
Representing Germany

Martin Echtler (born 14 January 1969) is a German ski mountaineer. He also competes in mountain running.

Echtler was born in Peiting. His sister Christine Echtler-Schleich is also member of the German skimountaineering team.

== Selected results ==
=== Ski mountaineering ===
- 2003:
  - 5th, Mountain Attack race
- 2004:
  - 1st, Dammkarwurm race
  - 2nd, Mountain Attack race
- 2005:
  - 3rd, German Championship single
  - 3rd, Mountain Attack
  - 10th, Trofeo Mezzalama (together with Wolfgang Panzer and Franz Graßl)
- 2006:
  - 2nd, German Championship single
  - 5th, World Championship relay race (together with Toni Steurer, Franz Graßl and Georg Nickaes)
- 2007:
  - 1st, German Championship vertical race
  - 2nd, German Championship single
  - 1st, Mountain Attack
  - 4th, Sellaronda Skimarathon (together with Heinz Verbnjak)
  - 4th, European Championship relay race (together with Toni Steurer, Konrad Lex and Stefan Klinger)
- 2008:
  - 2nd, German Championship team
- 2010:
  - 9th, World Championship relay race (together with Konrad Lex, Andreas Strobel and Alexander Schuster)

==== Patrouille des Glaciers ====
- 2006: 7th (and 2nd "seniors II" ranking) as well as German record, Patrouille des Glaciers ("seniors II" ranking), together with Franz Graßl and Toni Steurer
- 2010: 9th ("ISMF men" ranking), together with Konrad Lex and Josef Rottmoser

=== Mountain running ===
- 2004:
  - 1st, Zugspitzlauf (Zugspitze run)
- 2006:
  - 1st, Zugspitzlauf
- 2007:
  - 1st, Zugspitzlauf
- 2008:
  - 1st, Zugspitzlauf
