= Lydia Prugger =

Austrian ski mountaineer (born 1969)

Personal information
- Born: 22 January 1969 (age 57)

Sport
- Sport: Skiing
Medal record
Ski mountaineering
Representing Austria
World Championships
Bronze medal – third place	2010 World Championship	Relay

Lydia Prugger (born 22 January 1969) from Ramsau am Dachstein is an Austrian ski mountaineer.

Prugger was inspired ski mountaineering by her father and later by her husband, who is a trained mountain guide. She has held the women's record at the Hochwurzen-Berglauf since 2006, and has been member of the national team since the foundation of the ASKIMO.

== Selected results ==
- 2006: 1st and course record, Hochwurzen-Berglauf
- 2007:
  - 1st, Hochwurzen-Berglauf
  - 1st, Lesachtal ski mountaineering run
  - 1st, Loser ski mountaineering race
  - 3rd, Knappen-Königs-Trophy, Bischofshofen
  - 4th, Mountain-Attack tour
- 2008:
  - 1st, Rofan Xtreme within the Austrian Championship
  - 1st and record at the new course, Hochwurzen-Berglauf
  - 1st, Laserzlauf
  - 1st, Lesachtal ski mountaineering run
  - 4th, World Championship vertical race
  - 10th, World Championship single race
- 2010:
  - 3rd, World Championship relay race (together with Michaela Eßl and Veronika Swidrak)
  - 5th, World Championship team race (together with Michaela Eßl)
  - 6th, World Championship vertical race
  - 7th, World Championship combination ranking
  - 2nd, Mountain Attack tour
- 2011:
  - 6th, World Championship relay (together with Michaela Eßl and Veronika Swidrak)
  - 8th, World Championship vertical race
  - 2nd, Champ Or Cramp

=== Patrouille des Glaciers ===
- 2010: 4th, (and 3rd in the "international civilian women" ranking), together with Veronika Swidrak and Michaela Eßl
