= Konrad Lex =

German ski mountaineer (born 1974)

Personal information
- Born: 7 December 1974 (age 51) Eggenfelden, Germany

Sport
- Sport: Skiing
Medal record
Representing Germany

Konrad Lex (born 7 December 1974 in Eggenfelden, Lower Bavaria) is a German ski mountaineer. He is a member of the DAV section Gangkofen and of the national team.

Lex studied at the Munich University of Applied Sciences.

== Selected results ==
- 2005:
  - 9th, Dammkarwurm
- 2006:
  - 7th, German Championship single
  - 9th, Mountain Attack race
- 2007:
  - 1st, German Championship single
  - 3rd, German Championship vertical race
  - 4th, European Championship relay race (together with Toni Steurer, Martin Echtler and Stefan Klinger)
- 2008:
  - 2nd, German Championship single
  - 3rd, German Championship vertical race
  - 6th, World Championship relay race (together with Toni Steurer, Andreas Strobel and Stefan Klinger)
- 2009:
  - 1st, German Championship vertical race
  - 3rd, Mountain Attack race
  - 9th, European Championship relay race (together with Toni Steurer, Andreas Strobel and Alexander Schuster)
- 2010:
  - 9th, World Championship relay race (together with Martin Echtler, Andreas Strobel and Alexander Schuster)
  - 1st, Mountain Attack race
- 2011:
  - 6th, World Championship relay, together with Philipp Reiter, Anton Palzer and Toni Steurer
  - 1st, German Championship vertical race

=== Patrouille des Glaciers ===
- 2010: 9th ("ISMF men" ranking), together with Martin Echtler and Josef Rottmoser
