= Anton Palzer =

German cyclist

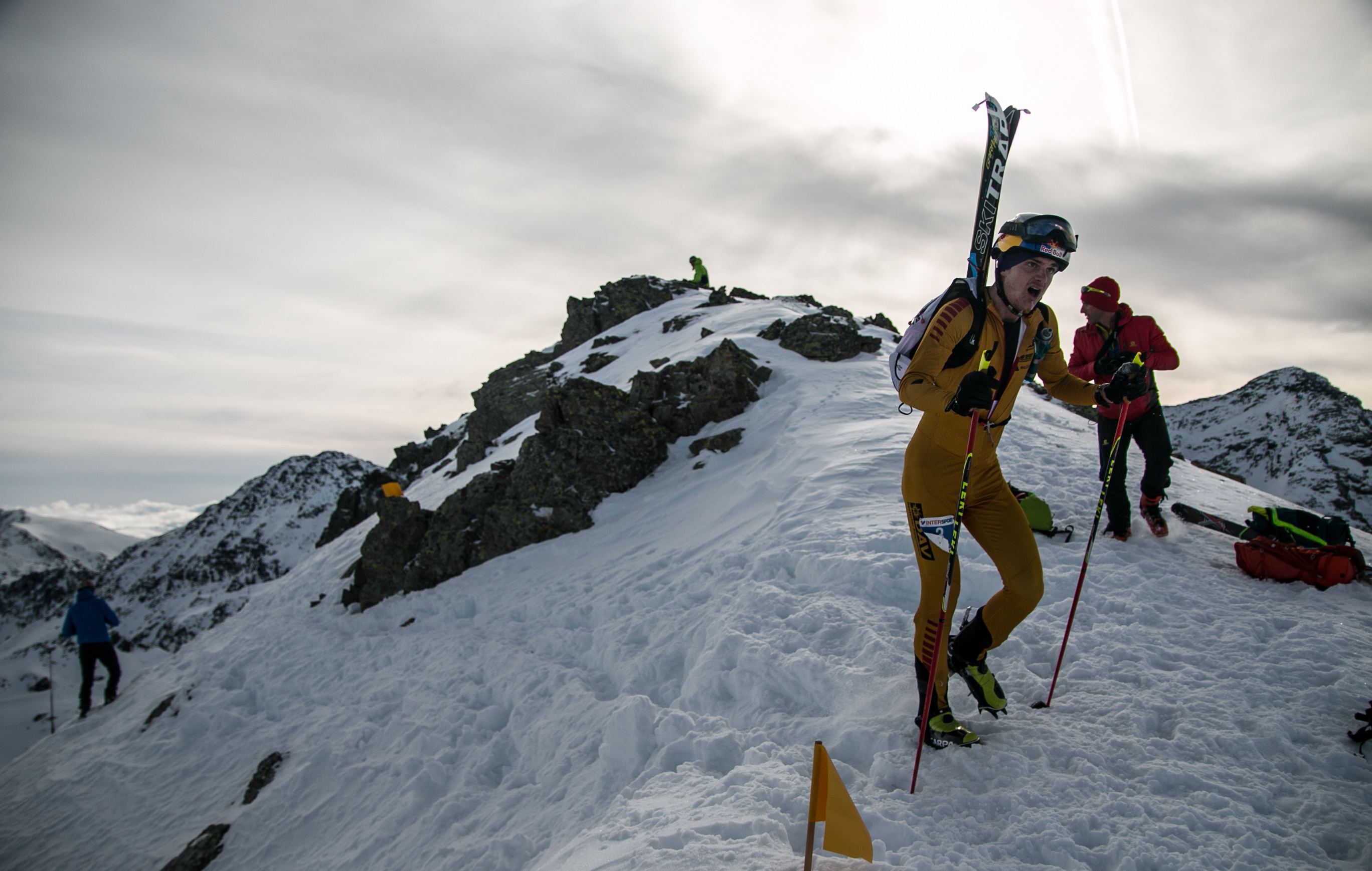
- Palzer in 2017

Personal information
- Born: 11 March 1993 (age 33) Ramsau bei Berchtesgaden, Germany

Cycling career
- Sport: Cycling
- Current team: Red Bull–Bora–Hansgrohe
- Disciplines: Ski mountaineering, road bicycle racing
- Role: Rider

Professional team
- 2021–: Bora–Hansgrohe
Medal record
Representing Germany
Ski mountaineering
World Championships
Silver medal – second place	2015	Vertical race
Silver medal – second place	2021	Vertical race
Silver medal – second place	2017	Sprint race
Bronze medal – third place	2017	Individual race

Anton "Toni" Palzer (born 11 March 1993) is a German ski mountaineer and cyclist. He is a member of the DAV section Berchtesgadener Land and of the German national selection.

Since April 2021, Palzer has joined Bora–Hansgrohe in road bicycle racing.

== Career ==
Born in Ramsau bei Berchtesgaden, Palzer attended the CJD Christophorusschule Berchtesgaden until 2009.

Competing in the cadets' class at the 2010 World Championship of Ski Mountaineering in Andorra, Palzer won the individual as well as the vertical race event.

In 2011, Palzer won Gold in the juniors' class individual and sprint race at the World Championship in Claut (Italy), and Silver in the juniors' vertical race. In 2012, during the European Championship in Pelvoux (France), he finished first in the juniors' individual and vertical race again. In both of these events, the 2011 World Championship as well as in the 2012 European Championship, he participated in the German seniors' relay race teams, which placed twice in the top ten.

Also in 2012, he won all the five races of the Youth World Cup.

== Selected results ==
- 2011: 6th, World Championship, relay, together with Philipp Reiter, Anton Steurer and Konrad Lex
- 2012: 5th, European Championship, relay, together with Josef Rottmoser, Philipp Reiter and Alexander Schuster

== Major cycling results ==
2023
10th Overall Tour of Turkey

=== Grand Tour general classification results timeline ===
Grand Tour	2021	2022	2023
Giro d'Italia	—	—	51
Tour de France	—	—	
Vuelta a España	102	—	

Legend
—	Did not compete
DNF	Did not finish
