= Maribel Martín =

Maribel Martín may refer to:

- Maribel Martín (actress) (born 1954), Spanish actress
- Maribel Martín (mountaineer) (born 1971), Spanish ski mountaineer
