= Verbnjak =

Verbnjak is a surname. Notable people with the surname include:

- Heinz Verbnjak (born 1973), Austrian ski mountaineer
- Paul Verbnjak (born 2001), Austrian ski mountaineer
