= Mathéo Jacquemoud =

French ski mountaineer (born 1990)

Personal information
- Born: 17 July 1990 (age 36) Lus-la-Croix-Haute

Sport
- Sport: Skiing
- Club: Team Ecrins Hautes-Alpes
Medal record
Representing France
Ski mountaineering
Silver medal – second place	2012 European Championship	Team

Mathéo Jacquemoud (born 17 July 1990) is a French ski mountaineer. He is member of the Team Ecrins Hautes-Alpes and member of the French national team of ski mountaineering. He also competes in mountain running.

== Selected results ==
- 2012:
  - 2nd, European Championship, team, together with Yannick Buffet
  - 6th, European Championship, combined ranking
  - 8th, European Championship, individual
  - 9th, European Championship, vertical race
  - 5th, Pierra Menta, together with Xavier Gachet
- 2013:
  - 1st, Pierra Menta, together with William Bon Mardion
- 2016:
  - 1st, Pierra Menta, together with Kilian Jornet Burgada
