= Veronika Swidrak =

Austrian ski mountaineer (born 1971)

Personal information
- Born: 12 December 1971 (age 54)

Sport
- Sport: Skiing
Medal record
Ski mountaineering
Representing Austria
World Championships
| Bronze medal – third place | 2010 World Championship | Relay |

Veronika "Vroni" Swidrak (born 12 December 1971) is an Austrian ski mountaineer.

Swidrak started ski mountaineering in the police ski rally team in 1996 and competed first in the Rally del Pizzo Scalino in the same year. She has been member of the ASKIMO national team since 2008 and lives in Radfeld.

== Selected results ==
- 2006:
  - 1st, Austrian Championship
  - 1st, Tyrolian Championship
- 2008:
  - 6th, World Championship long distance race
- 2010:
  - 3rd, World Championship relay race (together with Lydia Prugger and Michaela Eßl)
  - 3rd, Mountain Attack tour
- 2011:
  - 6th, World Championship relay (together with Michaela Eßl and Lydia Prugger)
  - 9th, World Championship sprint
  - 2nd, Mountain Attack
- 2012:
  - 5th, European Championship sprint
  - 5th, European Championship relay, together with Michaela Eßl and Ina Forchthammer
  - 7th, European Championship single
  - 9th, European Championship vertical race
  - 9th, World Championship vertical, combined ranking

=== Trofeo Mezzalama ===
- 2009: 4th, together with Maria Strasser and Klaudia Tasz

=== Patrouille des Glaciers ===
- 2010: 4th, (and 3rd in the "international civilian women" ranking), together with Lydia Prugger and Michaela Eßl

=== Pierra Menta ===
- 2011: 7th, together with Nina Cook Silitch
