= Mireia Miró =

Spanish ski mountaineer and long-distance runner

Mireia Miró Varela
Personal information
- Born: 31 July 1988 (age 38) Barcelona, Spain

Sport
- Sport: Skiing
Medal record
Representing Spain
Ski mountaineering
World Championships
Gold medal – first place	2011 World Championship	Individual
Gold medal – first place	2011 World Championship	Vertical race
Bronze medal – third place	2011 World Championship	Relay
European Championships
Silver medal – second place	2009 European Championship	Vertical race
Silver medal – second place	2012 European Championship	Team
Silver medal – second place	2012 European Championship	Individual
Silver medal – second place	2012 European Championship	Vertical race
Silver medal – second place	2012 European Championship	Relay
Skyrunning
World Championships
Silver medal – second place	2010 Premana	SkyMarathon

Mireia Miró Varela (born 31 July 1988) is a Spanish ski mountaineer and long-distance runner.

Miró was born in Barcelona. She started ski mountaineering in 2005 and competed first in the Cronoescalada race in Cerler in 2006. In the same year she became a member of the national team (Equipo PNTD Esquí de Montaña) and a "high level athlete" of the high sports council (Spanish: Consejo Superior de Deportes) of the Spanish government (No. 47.641.303 - Montaña y Escalada).

== Selected results ==
=== Ski mountaineering ===
- 2007:
  - 1st, European Championship "juniors" class single race
  - 1st, European Championship "juniors" class relay race (together with Kílian Jornet Burgada and Marc Pinsach Rubirola)
  - 1st, Traça Catalana race "juniors" class
- 2009:
  - 2nd, European Championship vertical race
  - 2nd, Valtellina Orobie World Cup race
  - 4th, European Championship team race (together with Izaskun Zubizarreta Guerendiain)
  - 4th, European Championship relay race (together with Gemma Arró Ribot and Izaskun Zubizarreta Guerendiain)
  - 4th, European Championship combination ranking
  - 5th, European Championship single race
  - 9th (and 2nd in the espoirs ranking), Trophée des Gastlosen (ISMF World Cup), together with Naila Jornet Burgada
- 2010:
  - 4th, World Championship relay race (together with Gemma Arró Ribot and Cristina Bes Ginesta)
  - 4th, World Championship vertical race
  - 4th, World Championship team race (together with Gemma Arró Ribot)
- 2011:
  - 1st, World Championship single race
  - 1st, World Championship vertical race
  - 3rd, World Championship relay (together with Cristina Bes Ginesta and Gemma Arró Ribot)
  - 3rd, World Championship vertical, combined ranking
  - 6th, World Championship sprint
  - 1st, Tour du Rutor (together with Gloriana Pellissier)
  - 1st, Mountain Attack
- 2012:
  - 2nd, European Championship single
  - 2nd, European Championship vertical race
  - 2nd, European Championship team, together with Gemma Arró Ribot
  - 2nd, European Championship relay, together with Marta Riba Carlos and Gemma Arró Ribot
  - 2nd, World Championship vertical, combined ranking
  - 1st, Patrouille de la Maya, together with Laëtitia Roux and Séverine Pont-Combe

==== Pierra Menta ====
- 2010: 2nd, together with Laëtitia Roux
- 2011: 1st, together with Laëtitia Roux

==== Trofeo Mezzalama ====
- 2011: 2nd, together with Laëtitia Roux and Nathalie Etzensperger

=== Mountain Running / skyrunning ===
- 2009:
  - 1st, Ben Nevis Race
  - 2nd, Skyrunner World Series
