= 2012 European Championship of Ski Mountaineering =

The 2012 European Championship of Ski Mountaineering (French: Championnat d'Europe de ski de montagne 2012) was the ninth European Championship of ski mountaineering and was held in Pelvoux in the Massif des Écrins (France) from February 4, 2012 to February 10, 2012.

The competition, organized by the International Ski Mountaineering Federation (ISMF), was originally planned in Claut, Italy, for the year 2011, which was held at last as the 2011 World Championship of Ski Mountaineering. Due to this circumstance, the ninth edition of the European championships was the first held in an even-numbered year. It was the first edition including a sprint race.

== Results ==
=== Nation ranking and medals ===
(all age groups; without combined ranking medals)

ranking	country	vertical race				relay				team				individual				sprint				
ranking	country	points				points				points				points				points				total points
1	France		3	3				3				1			3	2			4		1	2372
2	Italy		1	2			1		3		1				1	3	2			3	1	2299
3	Switzerland			1	2		2		1		1		1		2		3		2	3	2	2296
4	Spain		3	1	2			2				1				3	1				2	2117
5	Poland														1					1	1	926
6	Germany		1		1										1				2			848
7	Austria				1																	790
8	Andorra																					770
9	Czech Republic			1																		618
10	Norway																					544
11	Bulgaria																					153
12	Greece																					129
13	Portugal																					46
14	Slovakia																					38
15	United Kingdom																					32
16	Sweden																					29

=== Team ===
Event held on February 5, 2012

List of the best 10 teams by gender:

==== Women ====
ranking	team	total time
	(Switzerland) Séverine Pont-Combe/Marie Troillet	02h 05' 41"
	(Spain) Gemma Arró Ribot/Mireia Miró Varela	02h 09' 05"
	(Switzerland) Émilie Gex-Fabry/Maude Mathys	02h 11' 08"
4	(Italy) Martina Valmassoi/Corinne Clos	02h 18' 27"
5	(Poland) Anna Figura/Klaudia Tasz	02h 19' 03"
6	(Spain) Marta Riba Carlos/Maria Fargues Gimeno	02h 29' 48"

==== Men ====
ranking	team	total time
	(Italy) Manfred Reichegger/Lorenzo Holzknecht	01h 51' 39"
	(France) Yannick Buffet/Mathéo Jacquemoud	01h 55' 08"
	(Switzerland) Martin Anthamatten/Yannick Ecoeur	01h 56' 14"
4	(Italy) Damiano Lenzi/Michele Boscacci	02h 00' 20"
5	(Spain) Kílian Jornet Burgada/Marc Pinsach Rubirola	02h 01' 01"
6	(Italy) Denis Trento/Matteo Eydallin	02h 04' 02"^{*)}
7	(Andorra) Joan Albós Cavaliere/Ludovic Albós Cavaliere	02h 12' 03"
8	(Spain) Marc Solá Pastoret/Miguel Caballero Ortega	02h 12' 32"^{*)}
9	(France) Pierre-François Gachet/Sébastien Vernaz Piémont	02h 13' 11"
10	(Andorra) Ferran Vila Bonell/Guilad Dodo Perez	02h 17' 57"

^{*)} includes 4 penalty minutes

=== Sprint ===
Event held on February 6, 2012

List of the best 10 participants by gender:

==== Women ====
ranking	participant	qualification	½ final	Final
	(Switzerland) Mireille Richard	03' 05.7"	03' 01.8"	03' 57.4"
	(Switzerland) Séverine Pont-Combe	03' 23.1"	03' 03.5"	02' 59.3"
	(Poland) Anna Figura	03' 14.8"	03' 05.4"	03' 05.0"
4	(Austria) Michaela Eßl	03' 20.4"	03' 16.3"	03' 09.0"
5	(Austria) Veronika Swidrak	03' 13.0"	03' 14.1"	03' 17.8"
6	(Italy) Elena Nicolini	03' 07.2"	03' 19.6"	03' 41.2"
7	(France) Émilie Favre	03' 08.4"	03' 18.7"	
8	(France) Marion Maneglia	03' 23.5"	03' 23.7"	
9	(Spain) Naila Jornet Burgada	03' 26.7"	03' 25.5"	
10	(Italy) Martina Valmassoi	03' 21.5"	03' 25.6"	

==== Men ====
ranking	participant	qualification	¼ final	½ final	Final
	(Germany) Josef Rottmoser	02' 56.7"	03' 00.8"	02' 48.0"	02' 41.1"
	(Italy) Robert Antonioli	03' 03.3"	02' 54.1"	02' 52.2"	02' 48.8"
	(Switzerland) Marcel Marti	02' 58.9"	03' 10.1"	02' 53.6"	02' 51.9"
4	(Switzerland) Yannick Ecoeur	03' 02.5"	03' 07.5"	02' 51.1"	02' 52.9"
5	(Switzerland) Marcel Theux	02' 55.8"	03' 04.2"	02' 52.7"	02' 54.3"
6	(Switzerland) Andreas Steindl	02' 50.3"	02' 57.5"	02' 53.3"	03' 13.2"
7	(France) William Bon Mardion	02' 59.7"	02' 58.9"	02' 55.3"	
8	(France) Cyrille Gardet	03' 02.7"	03' 08.4"	03' 03.3"	
9	(France) Valentin Favre	03' 16.3"	03' 08.5"	03' 03.6"	
10	(Switzerland) Alan Tissières	03' 09.8"	03' 06.3"	03' 07.3"	

=== Individual ===
Event held on February 8, 2012

List of the best 10 participants by gender:

==== Women ====
ranking	participant	total time
	(France) Laëtitia Roux	01h 19' 14"
	(Spain) Mireia Miró Varela	01h 22' 24"
	(Switzerland) Séverine Pont-Combe	01h 27' 05"
4	(Switzerland) Marie Troillet	01h 49' 48"
5	(Switzerland) Émilie Gex-Fabry	01h 31' 27"
6	(Austria) Michaela Eßl	01h 31' 47"
7	(Austria) Veronika Swidrak	01h 31' 48"
8	(Germany) Barbara Gruber	01h 32' 44"
9	(Poland) Anna Figura	01h 34' 38"
10	(Italy) Elisa Compagnoni	01h 36' 04"

==== Men ====
ranking	participant	total time
	(France) William Bon Mardion	01h 08' 00"
	(Spain) Kílian Jornet Burgada	01h 08' 39"
	(Switzerland) Martin Anthamatten	01h 08' 45"
4	(Italy) Manfred Reichegger	01h 09' 23"
5	(France) Alexis Sévennec-Verdier	01h 09' 42"
6	(Italy) Matteo Eydallin	01h 09' 50"
7	(Italy) Robert Antonioli	01h 09' 50"
8	(France) Mathéo Jacquemoud	01h 09' 57"
9	(Switzerland) Yannick Ecoeur	01h 10' 49"
10	(Italy) Lorenzo Holzknecht	01h 11' 37"

=== Vertical race ===
Event held on February 9, 2012

List of the best 10 participants by gender:

==== Women ====
ranking	participant	total time
	(France) Laëtitia Roux	25' 16.9"
	(Spain) Mireia Miró Varela	26' 28.6"
	(Spain) Gemma Arró Ribot	27' 54.7"
4	(Switzerland) Maude Mathys	28' 31.0"
5	(Switzerland) Séverine Pont-Combe	28' 49.9"
6	(Italy) Gloriana Pellissier	28' 55.5"
7	(France) Corinne Favre	29' 19.1"
8	(Austria) Michaela Eßl	29' 22.8"
9	(Austria) Veronika Swidrak	29' 45.0"
10	(Germany) Barbara Gruber	29' 45.6"

==== Men ====
ranking	participant	total time
	(Spain) Kílian Jornet Burgada	38' 44.4"
	(France) Yannick Buffet	39' 43.7"
	(Switzerland) Martin Anthamatten	40' 10.7"
4	(Italy) Manfred Reichegger	40' 31.4"
5	(Italy) Pietro Lanfranchi	40' 52.4"
6	(France) William Bon Mardion	41' 43.1"
7	(Austria) Alexander Fasser	41' 28.0"
8	(Spain) Marc Pinsach Rubirola	41' 34.4""
9	(France) Mathéo Jacquemoud	41' 46.6"
10	(Spain) Marc Solà Pastoret	41' 53.5"

=== Relay ===
Event held on February 10, 2012

List of the best 10 teams by gender:

==== Women ====
ranking	team	total time
	(Switzerland) Séverine Pont-Combe/Émilie Gex-Fabry/Mireille Richard	34' 07,3"
	(Spain) Marta Riba Carlos/Gemma Arró Ribot/Mireia Miró Varela	34' 18.3"
	(Italy) Gloriana Pellissier/Elena Nicolini/Martina Valmassoi	34' 33.7"
4	(France) Corinne Favre/Émilie Favre/Laëtitia Roux	35' 49.2"
5	(Austria) Michaela Eßl/Ina Forchthammer/Veronika Swidrak	35' 56.0"
6	(Poland) Anna Figura/Anna Tybor/Julia Wajda	38' 05.5"

==== Men ====
ranking	team	total time
	(Switzerland) Martin Anthamatten/Marcel Theux/Yannick Ecoeur/Alan Tissières	00h 34' 42.5"
	(France) Alexis Sévennec-Verdier/Valentin Favre/Yannick Buffet/William Bon Mardion	00h 35' 08.1"
	(Italy) Matteo Eydallin/Damiano Lenzi/Manfred Reichegger/Robert Antonioli	00h 36' 11.3"
4	(Spain) Marc Pinsach Rubirola/Marc Solà Pastoret/Miguel Caballero Ortega/Kílian Jornet Burgada	00h 36' 52.8"
5	(Germany) Josef Rottmoser/Philipp Reiter/Anton Palzer/Alexander Schuster	00h 38' 33.0"
6	(Norway) Ola Berger/Ola Herje Hovdenak/Ove-Erik Tronvoll/Olav Tronvoll	00h 39' 14.7"
7	(Austria) Martin Weißkopf/Martin Islitzer/Markus Stock/Alexander Fasser	00h 40' 49.0"
8	(Andorra) Xavier Comas Guixé/Guilad Dodo Perez/Ludovic Albós Cavaliere/Joan Albós Cavaliere	00h 42' 41.4"
9	(Portugal) Gonçalo Silva/Henrique Claro/José Ferreira/Nuno Caetano	01h 06' 53.5"

=== Combination ranking ===
combined ranking (results of the individual, team and vertical race events)

List of the best 10 participants by gender:

==== Women ====
ranking	participant
	(Switzerland) Séverine Pont-Combe
	(Spain) Mireia Miró Varela
	(France) Laëtitia Roux
4	(Poland) Anna Figura
5	(Spain) Gemma Arró Ribot
6	(Switzerland) Émilie Gex-Fabry
7	(Austria) Michaela Eßl
8	(Switzerland) Marie Troillet
9	(Austria) Veronika Swidrak
10	(Switzerland) Mireille Richard

==== Men ====
ranking	participant
	(Spain) Kílian Jornet Burgada
	(Switzerland) Martin Anthamatten
	(Italy) Manfred Reichegger
4	(Switzerland) Yannick Ecoeur
5	(France) William Bon Mardion
6	(France) Mathéo Jacquemoud
7	(France) Yannick Buffet
8	(Italy) Robert Antonioli
9	(Germany) Josef Rottmoser
10	(Spain) Marc Pinsach Rubirola
