= Elisa Fleischmann =

Italian ski mountaineer

Personal information
- Born: 7 September 1985 (age 40) Sondalo, Italy

Sport
- Sport: Skiing
Medal record
Ski mountaineering
Representing Italy
World Championships
Silver medal – second place	2008 World Championship	Relay

Elisa Fleischmann (born 7 September 1985) from Valdidentro is an Italian ski mountaineer. She is born in Sondalo and has been member of the national team since 2007.

== Selected results ==
- 2007:
  - 1st, Italian Championship vertical race
  - 2nd, Pierra Menta "espoirs" class race (together with Anne Claire Estubier)
  - 2nd, European Championship vertical race ("espoirs" class)
  - 3rd, European Championship horizontal race
  - 4th, European Championship combination ranking
  - 5th, European Championship team race (together with Tamara Lunger)
  - 6th, European Championship single race
  - 10th, European Championship vertical race
- 2008:
  - 1st, Pierra Menta "espoirs" class race (together with Tamara Lunger)
  - 3rd, Sellaronda Skimarathon (together with Tamara Lunger)
  - 2nd, World Championship relay race (together with Gloriana Pellissier, Francesca Martinelli and Roberta Pedranzini)
