= Xavier Gachet =

French ski mountaineer (born 1989)

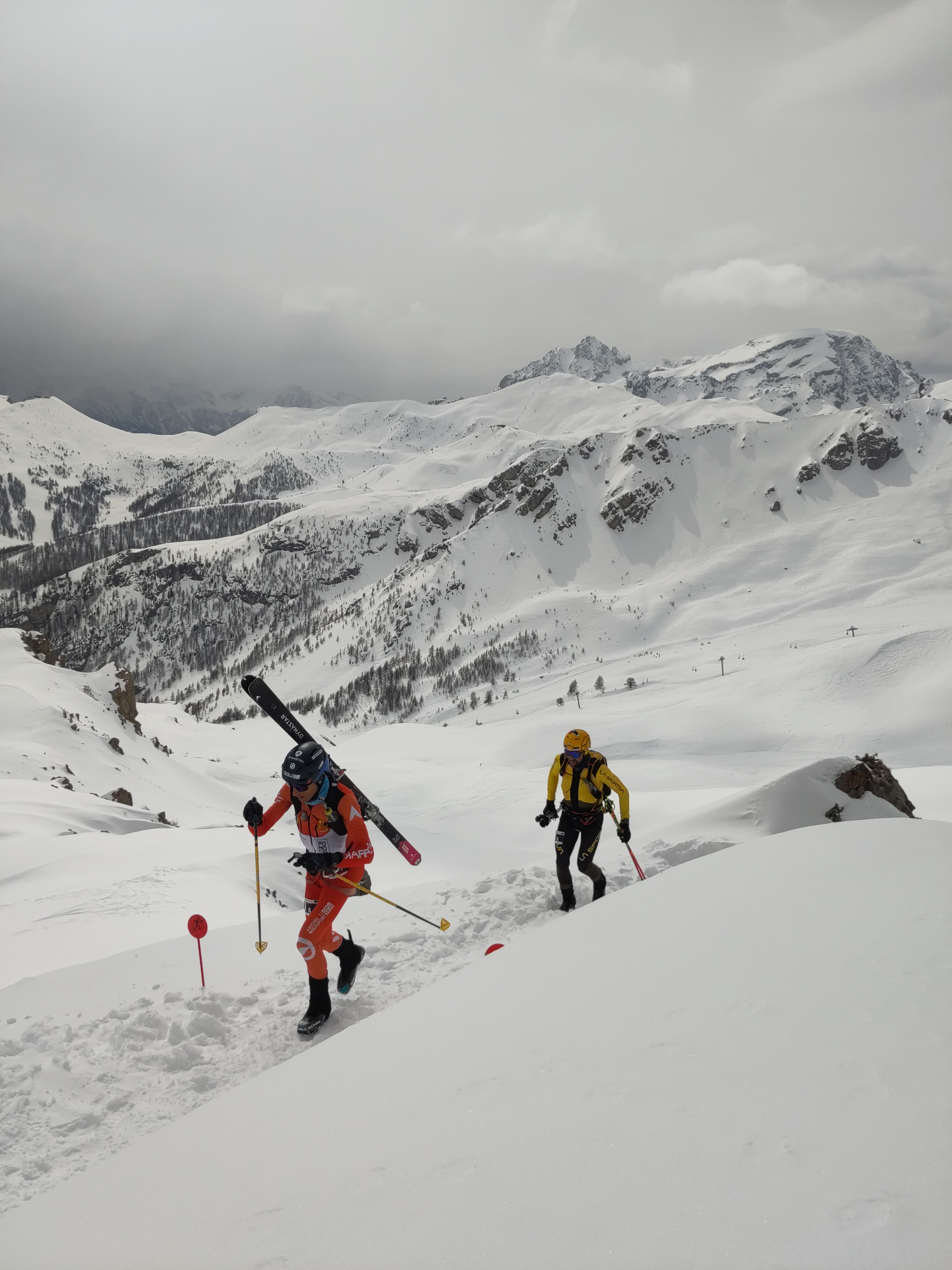

Personal information
- Born: 31 October 1989 (age 36)

Sport
- Sport: Skiing
Medal record
Ski mountaineering
Representing France
World Championships
Bronze medal – third place	2011 World Championship	Relay

Xavier Gachet (born 31 October 1989) is a French ski mountaineer.

Gachet attended the Lycée René Perrin in Ugine.

== Selected results ==
- 2010:
  - 3rd (espoirs), Trophée des Gastlosen (ISMF World Cup), together with Sébastien Perrier
- 2011:
  - 3rd, World Championship, relay, together with Didier Blanc, Yannick Buffet and William Bon Mardion
  - 4th, World Championship, sprint
- 2013:
  - 3rd, World Championship, Team Race, together with Alexis Sévennec-Verdier
  - 3rd, World Championship, Relay, together with Alexis Sévennec-Verdier, Mathéo Jacquemoud and William Bon Mardion
- 2015:
  - 4ème en individuel, 2015 Championnat du Monde de ski alpinisme de Verbier,
  - Vice Champion du Monde par équipe, 2015 Championnat du Monde de ski alpinisme de Verbier, Team Race, avec William Bon-mardion
  - Vice Champion du Monde de relais, 2015 Championnat du Monde de ski alpinisme de Verbier, Relais, avec Alexis Sévennec, Didier blanc and William Bon Mardion

=== Pierra Menta ===
- 2011: 10th, together with Alexis Sévennec-Verdier
- 2012: 5th, together with Mathéo Jacquemoud
- 2013: 5th, together with Florent Perrier
- 2014: 3rd, together with Valentin Favre

=== Trofeo Mezzalama ===
- 6th, together with Grégory Gachet and Alexis Sévennec-Verdier
- 5th, together with Alexis Sévennec-Verdier and Davide Galizzi
