= Michaela Eßl =

Austrian ski mountaineer

Personal information
- Born: 27 October 1988 (age 37)

Sport
- Sport: Skiing
Medal record
Ski mountaineering
Representing Austria
World Championships
Bronze medal – third place	2010 World Championship	Relay

Michaela Eßl (born 27 October 1988) is an Austrian ski mountaineer. She has been member of the ASKIMO national team since 2008. Professionally she works as a police officer in Abtenau.

== Selected results ==
- 2008:
  - 1st, Knappen-Königs-Trophy
  - 1st, Preberlauf,
  - 1st, Dachstein-Xtreme,
  - 1st, Monte di Brenta,
  - 3rd, Mountain Attack
- 2009:
  - 1st, Austrian Championship
  - 9th, European Championship single race
  - 9th, European Championship vertical race
- 2010:
  - 3rd, World Championship relay race (together with Lydia Prugger and Veronika Swidrak)
  - 5th, World Championship team race (together with Lydia Prugger)
  - 1st, World Championship single race (espoirs class)
  - 3rd, World Championship vertical race (espoirs class)
  - 10th, World Championship combination ranking
  - 1st, Mountain Attack
- 2011:
  - 6th, World Championship relay (together with Lydia Prugger and Veronika Swidrak)
- 2012:
  - 4th, European Championship sprint
  - 5th, European Championship relay, together with Ina Forchthammer and Veronika Swidrak
  - 6th, European Championship single
  - 7th, World Championship vertical, combined ranking
  - 8th, European Championship vertical race
  - 1st, Mountain Attack

=== Patrouille des Glaciers ===
- 2010: 4th (and 3rd in the "international civilian women" ranking), together with Veronika Swidrak and Lydia Prugger
