= Dusautoir =

Dusautoir is a surname. Notable people with the surname include:

- Sophie Dusautoir Bertrand (born 1972), Andorran ski mountaineer
- Thierry Dusautoir (born 1981), French rugby union footballer
