= Xavier Comas Guixé =

Andorran ski mountaineer (born 1977)

Personal information
- Born: 29 July 1977 (age 48)

Sport
- Sport: Skiing
Medal record
Representing Andorra

Xavier "Xavi" Comas Guixé (born 29 July 1977) is an Andorran ski mountaineer.

Comas started ski mountaineering in 2000 and competed first in the Trofeu CTP Boí Taüll race in 2001. He has been a member of the national team since 2001 and lives in La Massana.

== Selected results ==
- 2005:
  - 7th, European Championship relay race (together with Toni Casals Rueda, Xavier Capdevila Romero and Joan Vilana Díaz)
- 2007:
  - 7th, European Championship relay race (together with Toni Casals Rueda, Xavier Capdevila Romero and Joan Albós Cavaliere)
- 2008:
  - 8th, World Championship relay race (together with Joan Albós Cavaliere, Xavier Capdevila Romero and Joan Vilana Díaz)
- 2010:
  - 8th, World Championship relay race (together with Joan Albós Cavaliere, Joan Vilana Díaz and Toni Casals Rueda)
- 2012:
  - 8th, European Championship relay, together with Guilad Dodo Perez, Ludovic and Joan Albós Cavaliere

=== Patrouille des Glaciers ===
- 2008: 6th ("seniors I" class ranking), together with Joan Vilana Díaz and Joan Albós Cavaliere
- 2010: 9th (and 7th "ISMF men" ranking)- with and end time of 6h58mn, together with Joan Vilana Díaz and Joan Albós Cavaliere
