= Yannick Buffet =

French ski mountaineer

Personal information
- Born: December 23, 1979 (age 46) La Rivière-Enverse, France

Sport
- Sport: Skiing
- Club: Praz Montagne
Medal record
Ski mountaineering
Representing France
World Championships
Silver medal – second place	2011 World Championship	Vertical race
Bronze medal – third place	2011 World Championship	Individual
Bronze medal – third place	2011 World Championship	Relay
European Championships
Gold medal – first place	2009 European Championship	Individual
Silver medal – second place	2012 European Championship	Vertical race
Silver medal – second place	2012 European Championship	Team
Silver medal – second place	2012 European Championship	Relay
Bronze medal – third place	2007 European Championship	Relay
Bronze medal – third place	2009 European Championship	vertical race

Yannick Buffet (born December 23, 1979) is a French ski mountaineer.

Buffet was born in La Rivière-Enverse. He is member of the Praz Montagne and has been member of the French national selection since 2007. He lives in Praz sur Arly.

== Selected results ==
- 2007:
  - 3rd, European Championship relay race (together with Bertrand Blanc, Tony Sbalbi and Fabien Anselmet)
  - 7th, European Championship team race (together with Bertrand Blanc)
- 2008:
  - 6th, World Championship
  - 9th (and 7th in the "international men" ranking), Patrouille des Glaciers (together with Philippe Blanc and Martial Premat)
- 2009:
  - 1st, European Championship single race
  - 1st, European Championship combination ranking
  - 3rd, European Championship vertical race
  - 3rd, Dachstein Xtreme
  - 4th, European Championship team race (together with Grégory Gachet)
- 2011:
  - 2nd, World Championship vertical race
  - 3rd, World Championship single race
  - 3rd, World Championship relay, together with Didier Blanc, Xavier Gachet and William Bon Mardion
  - 4th, World Championship vertical, combined ranking
- 2012:
  - 2nd, European Championship vertical race
  - 2nd, European Championship team, together with Mathéo Jacquemoud
  - 2nd, European Championship relay, together with Alexis Sévennec-Verdier, Valentin Favre and William Bon Mardion
  - 7th, World Championship vertical, combined ranking

=== Pierra Menta ===
- 2009: 3rd, together with Florent Perrier
- 2012: 6th, together with Yannick Ecoeur
