= Ludovic Albós Cavaliere =

Andorran ski mountaineer (born 1979)

Personal information
- Born: 4 May 1979 (age 47)

Sport
- Sport: Skiing
Medal record
Representing Andorra

Ludovic Albós Cavaliere (born 4 May 1979) is an Andorran ski mountaineer.

Albos, expert accountant and commercial adviser, started working in commercial àrea in 1999, since this year he has been working in different commercial areas as accountant and adviser.

In his free time, he practises ski mountaineering, started it in 2006 and competed first in the Gp Vallnord in the same year. He has been member of the Andorran national ski mountaineering team since 2006. Albos placed ninth in the vertical race event of the 2007 European Championship.

His brothers David and Joan are also competition ski mountaineers.

== Selected studies career ==
- FP2 - Technician administrative accountant
- Graduate in tourism
- Licenciate administration companies

== Selected sport results ==
- 2007:
  - 9th, European Championship vertical Race
- 2008:
  - 17th, World Championship vertical Race
- 2009:
  - 19th, European Championship vertical Race
  - 2nd, 2009 La Serrera Ski Mountaineering race
- 2012:
  - 7th, European Championship team, together with Joan Albós Cavaliere
  - 8th, European Championship relay, together with Xavier Comas Guixé, Guilad Dodo Perez and Joan Albós Cavaliere

== Other activities ==
- 2009:
  - L.Bordas xtreme
