= Heinz Verbnjak =

Austrian ski mountaineer (born 1973)

Personal information
- Born: 2 September 1973 (age 52)

Sport
- Sport: Skiing

Heinz Verbnjak (born 2 September 1973) from Klagenfurt is an Austrian ski mountaineer.

Verbnjak won several national races and was member of the national team.

== Personal life ==
Verbnjak's son, Paul, is also a ski mountaineer.

== Selected results ==
- 2007:
  - 1st, Hochwurzen-Berglauf
  - 4th, Sellaronda Skimarathon (together with Martin Echtler)
  - 6th, Mountain Attack marathon
- 2008:
  - 1st, Knappen-Königs-Trophy, Bischofshofen
  - 1st, Champ Or Cramp
  - 2nd, Preberlauf
  - 3rd, Sellaronda Skimarathon (together with Andreas Ringhofer)
  - 4th, Mountain Attack marathon
- 2009:
  - 8th, Mountain Attack marathon
