= Sandrine Favre =

French ski mountaineer (born 1988)

Personal information
- Born: 5 September 1988 (age 37)

Sport
- Sport: Skiing
Medal record
Ski mountaineering
Representing France
World Championships
Silver medal – second place	2011 World Championship	Relay

Sandrine Favre (born 5 September 1988) is a French ski mountaineer.

== Selected results ==
- 2010:
  - 5th, World Championship, relay, together with Laëtitia Roux and Valentine Fabre
- 2011:
  - 2nd, World Championship, relay, together with Laëtitia Roux and Émilie Favre
  - 10th, World Championship, sprint
  - 8th, Pierra Menta, together with Émilie Favre
