= Malene Haukøy =

Norwegian ski mountaineer (born 1991)

Personal information
- Born: 12 July 1991 (age 35) Kyrkjebø, Norway

Sport
- Sport: Skiing

Malene Haukøy (born 12 July 1991) is a Norwegian ski mountaineer, trail runner, and member of the national selection.

Haukøy was born in Kyrkjebø in Høyanger Municipality. She started ski mountaineering at the age of 15 years. Besides several notable results in juniors' class rankings, she placed twice in the seniors' top ten rankings by participating in relay events at the 2010 and 2011 World Championships.

Haukøy currently lives in Sogndalsfjøra. Her younger brother Eirik also competes in ski mountaineering races.

== Selected results ==
- 2010: 6th, World Championship, relay, together with Marit Tveite Bystøl and Oddrun Brakstad Orset
- 2011: 8th, World Championship, relay, together with Ingvild Ryggen Carstens and Mari Fasting
- 2016: 5th, Altitoy-Ternua, together with Ida Nilsson
