= Anna Figura =

Polish ski mountaineer (born 1990)

Personal information
- Born: 6 February 1990 (age 36) Zakopane, Poland

Sport
- Sport: Skiing
- Club: Klub Skialpinistyczny Kandahar
Medal record
Ski mountaineering
Bronze medal – third place	2012 European Championship	Sprint

Anna Figura (born 6 February 1990) is a Polish ski mountaineer.

Figura is born in Zakopane, and studies forestry at the University of Agriculture in Krakow. She is member of the Klub Skialpinistyczny Kandahar. Her sister Paulina is also a competition ski mountaineer.

== Selected results ==
- 2011:
  - 4th, World Championship, relay, together with Julia Wajda and Klaudia Tasz
  - 7th, World Championship, sprint
  - 10th, World Championship, team, together with Julia Wajda
- 2012:
  - 3rd, European Championship, sprint
  - 4th, European Championship, combined ranking
  - 5th, European Championship, team, together with Klaudia Tasz
  - 6th, European Championship, relay, together with Anna Tybor and Julia Wajda
  - 9th, European Championship, individual
