= Émilie Favre =

French ski mountaineer (born 1992)

Personal information
- Born: 8 December 1992 (age 33)

Sport
- Sport: Skiing
Medal record
Ski mountaineering
Representing France
World Championships
Silver medal – second place	2011 World Championship	Relay

Émilie Favre (French pronunciation: [emili favʁ]; born 8 December 1992) is a French ski mountaineer.

== Selected results ==
- 2011:
  - 2nd, World Championship, relay, together with Laëtitia Roux and Sandrine Favre
  - 8th, Pierra Menta, together with Sandrine Favre
- 2012:
  - 4th, European Championship relay, together with Laëtitia Roux and Corinne Favre
  - 7th, European Championship, sprint
