= Xavier Capdevila Romero =

Andorran ski mountaineer (born 1976)

Personal information
- Born: 17 July 1976 (age 50) Canillo, Andorra

Sport
- Sport: Skiing
Medal record
Representing Andorra

Xavier "Xavi" Capdevila Romero (born 17 July 1976) from Escaldes-Engordany is an Andorran ski mountaineer.

Capdevila was born in Canillo. He started ski mountaineering in 1998 and competed first in the (La) Serrera race in the same year.

He is a professional firefighter, and is married to Neus Tort Gendrau.

== Selected results ==
- 2004:
  - 8th, World Championship relay race (together with Joan Vilana Díaz, Manel Pelegrina Lopez and Toni Casals Rueda)
- 2005:
  - 1st, Circuit Català Pro-Olímpic
  - 1st, Snow Top Andorra
  - 7th, European Championship relay race (together with Toni Casals Rueda, Xavier Comas Guixé and Joan Vilana Díaz)
- 2006:
  - 8th, World Championship relay race (together with Toni Casals Rueda, Joan Albós Cavaliere and Joan Vilana Díaz)
- 2007:
  - 7th, European Championship relay race (together with Toni Casals Rueda, Joan Albós Cavaliere and Xavier Comas Guixé)
- 2008:
  - 8th, World Championship relay race (together with Xavier Comas Guixé, Joan Vilana Díaz and Joan Albós Cavaliere)
- 2009:
  - 6th, European Championship relay race (together with Toni Casals Rueda, Joan Albós Cavaliere and Joan Vilana Díaz)
