= Julia Wajda =

Polish ski mountaineer (born 1990)

Personal information
- Born: 28 September 1990 (age 35) Rabka-Zdrój, Poland

Sport
- Sport: Skiing

Julia Wajda (born 28 September 1990) is a Polish ski mountaineer.

Wajda was born in Rabka-Zdrój. She started ski mountaineering in 2000, and competed first in 2001.

== Selected results ==
- 2010:
  - 2nd (espoirs), Trophée des Gastlosen (ISMF World Cup), together with Paulina Figura
- 2011:
  - 4th, World Championship, relay, together with Klaudia Tasz and Anna Figura
  - 10th, World Championship, team, together with Anna Figura
- 2012:
  - 6th, European Championship, relay, together with Anna Figura and Anna Tybor
