= Bodil Ryste =

Personal information
- Nationality: Norway
- Born: 26 July 1979 (age 46) Ørsta, Norway

Sport
- Sport: Skiing
- Club: Gaular IL

World Cup career
- Seasons: 2 – (2002, 2004)
- Indiv. starts: 3
- Indiv. podiums: 0
- Team starts: 0
- Overall titles: 0
- Discipline titles: 0

Bodil Ryste (born 26 July 1979) is a Norwegian ski mountaineer and cross-country skier.

Ryste was born in Ørsta Municipality. She lives in Bygstad.

== Cross-country skiing results ==
All results are sourced from the International Ski Federation (FIS).

=== World Cup ===
==== Season standings ====
Season	Age			
Season	Age	Overall	Distance	Sprint
2002	22	NC	—N/a	—
2004	24	NC	NC	—

== Ski mountaineering results ==
- 2007:
  - 5th, European Championship relay race (together with Ellen Blom and Lene Pedersen)
  - 9th, European Championship team race (together with Marit Tveite Bystøl)
- 2008:
  - 4th, World Championship relay race (together with Lene Pedersen, Ellen Blom and Marit Tveite Bystøl)
- 2009:
  - 5th, European Championship relay race (together with Marit Tveite Bystøl and Oddrun Brakstad Orset)
  - 6th, European Championship team race (together with Marit Tveite Bystøl)
  - 9th, European Championship combination ranking
