= Karl Almestål =

Swedish ski mountaineer and telemark skier

Personal information
- Born: 7 February 1979 (age 47) Tibro, Sweden

Sport
- Sport: Skiing

Karl Almestål (born 7 February 1979) is a Swedish ski mountaineer and telemark skier.

Almestål was born in Tibro. He started telemark skiing in 1997, and competition ski mountaineering in 2006. He is member of the Hjo Velocipedklubb.

At the 2011 World Championship of Ski Mountaineering he participated in a team with André Jonsson, Björn Gund and the Norwegian Olav Tronvoll in the seniors' relay event, and finished ninth.
