= Josef Rottmoser =

German ski mountaineer (born 1990)

Personal information
- Born: 7 February 1990 (age 36) Rosenheim, Germany

Sport
- Sport: Skiing
Medal record
Representing Germany
Ski mountaineering
Gold medal – first place	2012 European Championship	Sprint

Josef "Seppi" Rottmoser (born 7 February 1990) is a German ski mountaineer.

== Career ==
Rottmoser was born in Rosenheim. He started ski mountaineering in 2000, and competed first in 2007.

== Selected results ==
- 2010:
  - 9th ("ISMF men" ranking), Patrouille des Glaciers, together with Konrad Lex and Martin Echtler
- 2012:
  - 1st, European Championship, sprint
  - 5th, European Championship, relay, together with Philipp Reiter, Anton Palzer and Alexander Schuster
  - 9th, European Championship, combination ranking
  - 1st, Hochgrat ski rallye
- 2013:
  - 1st, World Championship, sprint
