= 2009 European Championship of Ski Mountaineering =

8th European Championship of Ski Mountaineering organized by ISMF

The 2009 European Championship of Ski Mountaineering (Italian: Campionati Europei di Sci alpinismo 2009) was the eighth European Championship of ski mountaineering and was held in Alpago (Tambre, Italy) from February 19, 2009 to February 24, 2009. The competition was organized by the International Ski Mountaineering Federation (ISMF), successor organization of the International Council for Ski Mountaineering Competitions (ISMC).

== Results ==
=== Nation ranking and medals ===
(all age groups)

ranking	country	vertical race				relay				team				individual				
ranking	country	points				points				points				points				total points
1	Italy	3292	1	3	2	800	3			1731	2	1	1	1920	3	3	2	7743
2	France	3380	1	1	2	696			2	753				1940	2	1	1	6769
3	Spain	3179	3	1	1	715		1		1221				1593	1			6708
4	Switzerland	2845	3		1	745		2	1	1242		1		1602	1	2	2	6434
5	Czech Republic	1567		1		377				990				933				3867
6	Norway	921			1	474				1938				758			1	3191
7	Germany	1548		1	1	374				579				480	1			2981
8	Austria	1267		1		258				414				853		1		2792
9	Andorra	866				237				1107			1	521				2731
10	Poland	1017				374				501				653		1	1	2545
11	Greece	983				207				465				534				2189
12	Slovenia	586				210				573				354				1723
13	Bulgaria									600				971				1571
14	United Kingdom	243								525				256				1024
15	Slovakia	320												210			1	530
16	Denmark	159												110				269

=== Vertical race ===
Event held on February 20, 2009

List of the best 10 participants by gender:

==== Women ====
ranking	participant	total time
	(Italy) Roberta Pedranzini	00h42 ' 55"
	(Spain) Mireia Miró Varela	00h 43' 25"
	(Italy) Francesca Martinelli	00h 43' 45"
4	(France) Laëtitia Roux	00h 44' 00"
5	(Switzerland) Nathalie Etzensperger	00h 45' 19"
6	(Andorra) Sophie Dusautoir Bertrand	00h 45' 55"
7	(Spain) Gemma Arró Ribot	00h 46' 00"
8	(Italy) Gloriana Pellissier	00h 46' 36"
9	(Austria) Michaela Eßl	00h 47' 22"
10	(Switzerland) Séverine Pont-Combe	00h 47' 50"

==== Men ====
ranking	participant	total time
	(Spain) Kílian Jornet Burgada	00h35 ' 51"
	(France) Tony Sbalbi	00h 36' 09"
	(France) Yannick Buffet	00h 36' 48"
4	(Italy) Manfred Reichegger	00h 37' 09"
5	(France) Grégory Gachet	00h 37' 13"
6	(Italy) Damiano Lenzi	00h 37' 21"
7	(Spain) Javier Martín de Villa	00h 37' 42"
8	(Switzerland) Florent Troillet	00h 37' 51"
9	(France) Florent Perrier	00h 37' 52"
10	(Switzerland) Sébastien Epiney	00h 37' 53"

=== Relay ===
Event held on February 21, 2009

List of the best 10 teams by gender:

==== Women ====
ranking	team	total time
	(Italy) Pedranzini/G. Pellissier/Martinelli	00h 31' 50"
	(Switzerland) Magnenat/Etzensperger/Pont-Combe	00h 32' 22"
	(France) Lathuraz/C. Favre/Roux	00h 34' 13"
4	(Spain) Arró Ribot/Zubizarreta Guerendiain/Miró Varela	00h 35' 14"
5	(Norway) Tveite Bystøl/Brakstad Orset/Ryste	00h 36' 29"

==== Men ====
ranking	team	total time
	(Italy) Holzknecht/Reichegger/Brunod/Lenzi	00h 34' 41"
	(Spain) Martín de Villa/Vendrell Martínez/Pérez Brunicardi/Jornet Burgada	00h 35' 04"
	(Switzerland) Troillet/Marti/Ecoeur/Bruchez	00h 35' 33"
4	(Austria) Wieland/Klocker/Bader/Fasser	00h 36' 25"
5	(France) D. Blanc/Bonnet/Premat/Sbalbi	00h 37' 32"
6	(Andorra) Casals Rueda/Albós Cavaliere/Vilana Díaz/Capdevila Romero	00h 38' 20"
7	(Norway) Berger/Hovdenak/Tronvoll/Eriksrud	??h 38' 23"
8	(Poland) Zachwieja/Żebracki/Wargocki/Bargiel	00h 38' 56"
9	(Germany) Steurer/Schuster/Strobel/Lex	00h 39' 20"
10	(Czech Republic) Duch/Štantejský/Jan Hepnar/Jos. Hepnar	00h 40' 33"

=== Team ===
Event held on February 22, 2009

List of the best 10 teams by gender:

==== Women ====
ranking	team	total time
	(Italy) Martinelli/Pedranzini	02h 57' 52"
	(Switzerland) Magnenat/Etzensperger	03h 08' 43"
	(Andorra) Tudel Cuberes/Dusautoir Bertrand	03h 15' 44"
4	(Spain) Miró Varela/Zubizarreta Guerendiain	03h 17' 20"
5	(Italy) Clos/Lunger	03h 31' 32"
6	(Norway) Ryste/Tveite Bystøl	03h 39' 05"
7	(Czech Republic) Formánková/Bánská	04h 07' 07"

==== Men ====
ranking	team	total time
	(Italy) Eydallin/Trento	02h 24' 11"
	(Italy) Holzknecht/Giacomelli	02h 27' 20"
	(Italy) Reichegger/D. Brunod	02h 29' 18"
4	(France) Buffet/Gachet	02h 29' 38"
5	(Spain) Martín de Villa/Jornet Burgada	02h 30' 17"
6	(France) Pellicier/Perrier	02h 33' 21"
7	(Switzerland) Ecoeur/Marti	02h 35' 03"
8	(Italy) Pedrini/Lanfranchi	02h 38' 12"
9	(Switzerland) Ginier/Farquet	02h 39' 28"
10	(Spain) Pérez Brunicardi/Bes Ginesta	02h 40' 29"

=== Individual ===
Event held on February 24, 2009

List of the best 10 participants by gender:

==== Women ====
ranking	participant	total time
	(Italy) Roberta Pedranzini	02h 21' 03"
	(Italy) Francesca Martinelli	02h 23' 31"
	(Italy) Gloriana Pellissier	02h 27' 20"
4	(Switzerland) Nathalie Etzensperger	02h 29' 07"
5	(Spain) Mireia Miró Varela	02h 30' 47"
6	(Switzerland) Gabrielle Magnenat	02h 31' 35"
7	(France) Laëtitia Roux	02h 35' 11"
8	(Andorra) Sophie Dusautoir Bertrand	02h 35' 44"
9	(Austria) Michaela Eßl	02h 40' 33"
10	(Italy) Corinne Clos	02h 43' 19"

==== Men ====
ranking	participant	total time
	(France) Yannick Buffet	02h 00' 21"
	(Italy) Manfred Reichegger	02h 00' 34"
	(Italy) Lorenzo Holzknecht	02h 01' 47"
4	(France) Florent Perrier	02h 02' 15"
5	(Spain) Javier Martín de Villa	02h 03' 31"
6	(France) Didier Blanc	02h 05' 31"
7	(Switzerland) Marcel Marti	02h 07' 19"
8	(Switzerland) Yannick Ecoeur	02h 07' 47"
9	(Italy) Denis Trento	02h 08' 06"
10	(France) Grégory Gachet	02h 08' 10"

=== Combination ranking ===
combined ranking (results of the individual, team and vertical race events)

List of the best 10 participants by gender:

==== Women ====
ranking	participant
	(Italy) Roberta Pedranzini
	(Italy) Francesca Martinelli
	(Switzerland) Nathalie Etzensperger
4	(Spain) Mireia Miró Varela
5	(Switzerland) Gabrielle Magnenat
6	(Andorra) Sophie Dusautoir Bertrand
7	(Spain) Izaskun Zubizarreta Guerendiain
8	(Italy) Corinne Clos
9	(Norway) Bodil Ryste
10	(Norway) Marit Tveite Bystøl

==== Men ====
ranking	participant
	(France) Yannick Buffet
	(Italy) Manfred Reichegger
	(Italy) Lorenzo Holzknecht
4	(Spain) Javier Martín de Villa
5	(France) Grégory Gachet
6	(France) Florent Perrier
7	(France) Didier Blanc
8	(Spain) Manuel Pérez Brunicardi
9	(Slovenia) Nejc Kuhar
10	(Austria) Johann Wieland
