= Marcel Theux =

Swiss mountaineer and runner (born 1988)

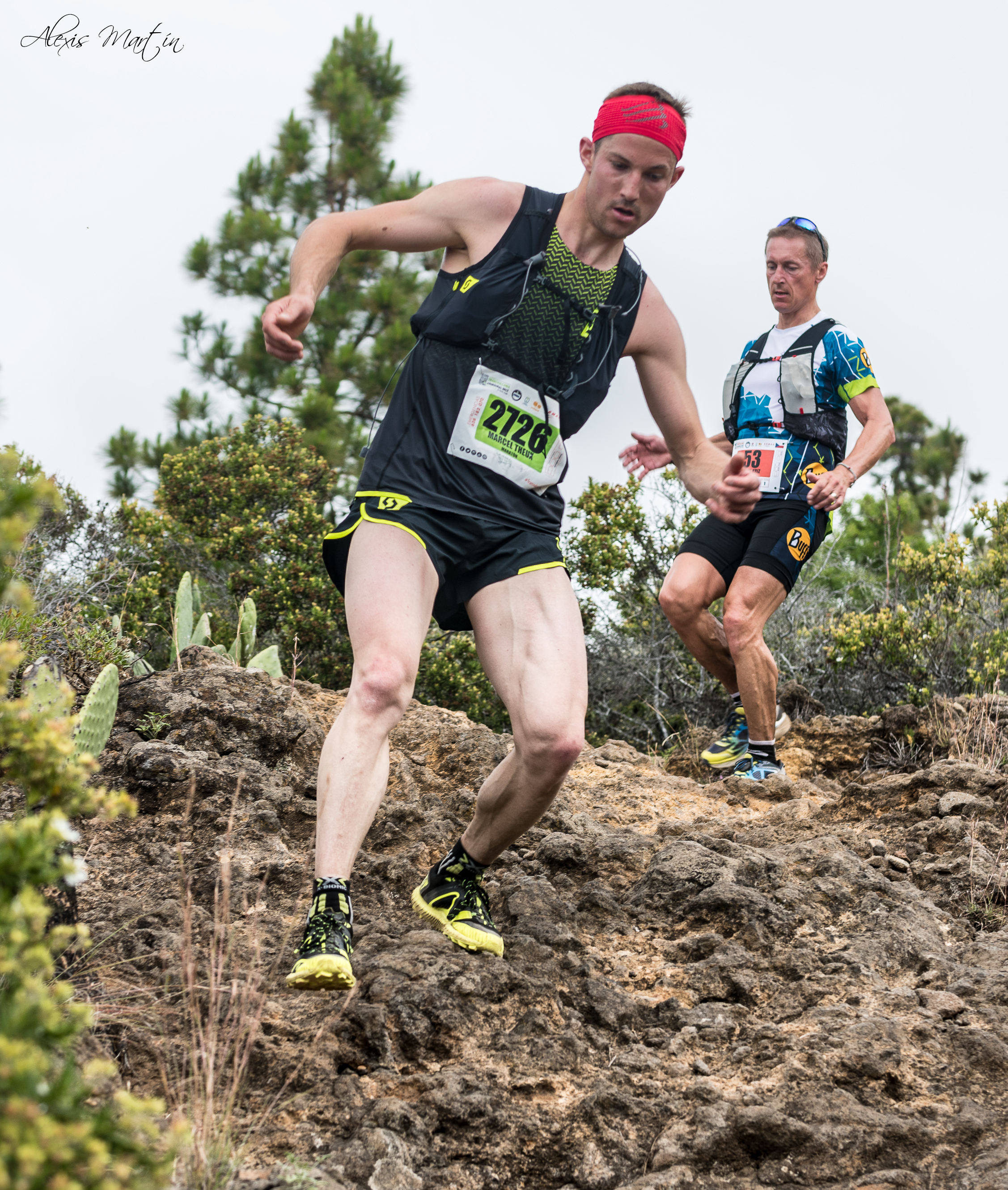

Personal information
- Born: 9 August 1988 (age 38) Orsières, Switzerland

Sport
- Sport: Skiing
Medal record
Ski mountaineering
Representing Switzerland
World Championships
Silver medal – second place	2011 World Championship	Relay
European Championships
Gold medal – first place	2012 European Championship	Relay

Marcel Theux (born 9 August 1988) is a Swiss ski mountaineer and long-distance runner.

Theux was born in Orsières. He started ski mountaineering in 2002 and participated in his first race in 2003. Since 2007, he has been member of the Swiss national selection.

== Selected results ==
=== Ski mountaineering ===
- 2010:
  - 2nd (espoirs), Trophée des Gastlosen (ISMF World Cup), together with Randy Michaud
- 2011:
  - 2nd, World Championship, relay, together with Yannick Ecoeur, Martin Anthamatten and Marcel Marti
  - 7th, sprint
  - 8th, Trofeo Mezzalama, together with Didier Moret and Alexander Hug
- 2012:
  - 1st, European Championship relay race, together with Martin Anthamatten, Yannick Ecoeur and Alan Tissières
  - 5th, European Championship, sprint

=== Running ===
- 2009:
  - 4th (juniors), Trail Verbier-St Bernard - "La Traversée", 52 km
- 2010:
  - 2nd, Trail Verbier-St Bernard - "La Traversée", 61 km
- 2011:
  - 2nd, Trail Verbier-St Bernard - "La Traversée", 61 km
