= Fabien Anselmet =

French ski mountaineer and skiing instructor

Personal information
- Born: 12 November 1960 (age 65)

Sport
- Sport: Skiing
Medal record
Representing France
Ski mountaineering
Bronze medal – third place	2007 European Championship	Relay

Fabien Anselmet (born 12 November 1960) is a French ski mountaineer and skiing instructor.

== Personal life ==
Anselmet's son, Thibault, is a ski mountaineer.

== Selected results ==
- 2007:
  - 1st, Trace de Vaugel A course (together with Sébastien Baud)
  - 3rd, European Championship relay race (together with Yannick Buffet, Bertrand Blanc and Tony Sbalbi)
  - 7th, Trofeo Mezzalama (together with Lionel Bonnel and Sébastien Baud)
  - 8th, Martial Premat team race (together with Martial Premat)

== Pierra Menta ==
- 2004: 10th, together with Jean-Marcel Grillet
- 2007: 9th, together with Sébastien Baud
