= Martin Anthamatten =

Swiss ski mountaineer and mountain runner

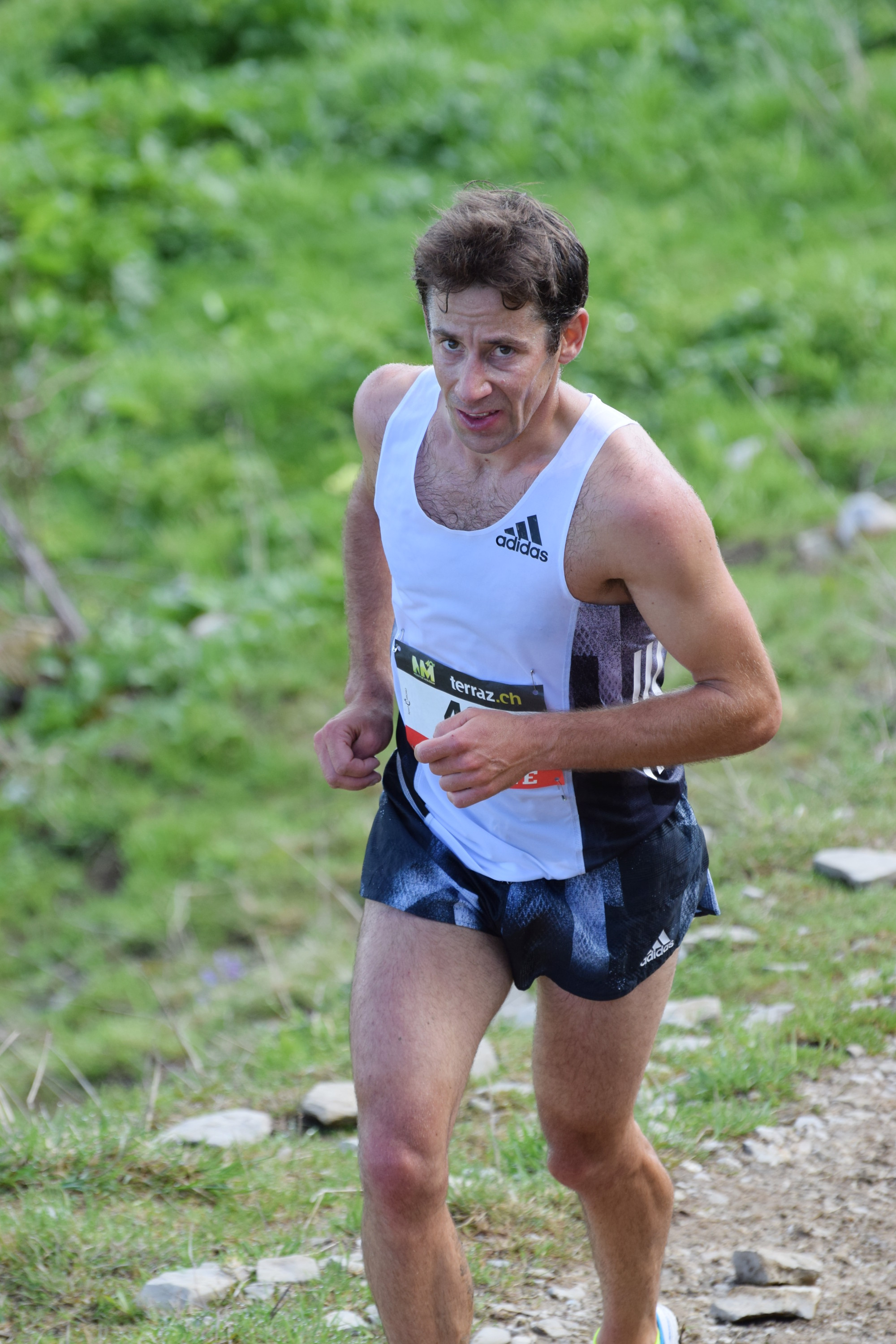

Personal information
- Born: 12 September 1984 (age 41) Zermatt, Switzerland

Sport
- Sport: Skiing
Medal record
Ski mountaineering
Representing Switzerland
World Championships
Gold medal – first place	2011 Claut	Sprint
Silver medal – second place	2008 Champery	Relay
Silver medal – second place	2010 Gran Valira	Team
Silver medal – second place	2010 Gran Valira	Relay
European Championships
Gold medal – first place	2012 Pelvoux	Relay
Bronze medal – third place	2012 Pelvoux	Individual
Bronze medal – third place	2012 Pelvoux	Vertical race
Bronze medal – third place	2012 Pelvoux	Team

Martin Anthamatten (born 12 September 1984) is a Swiss ski mountaineer and mountain runner.

== Career ==
Anthamatten was born in Zermatt. He played ice hockey for National League B until 2005, and has been member of the national ski mountaineering team since 2007.

== Selected results ==
=== Ski mountaineering ===
- 2007:
  - 1st and course record, Zermatt-Rothorn mountain race
  - 1st, Swiss Championship "juniors" class, Grindelwald
- 2008:
  - 2nd, World Championship relay race (together with Pierre Bruchez, Florent Troillet and Didier Moret)
  - 8th, World Cup race, Val d'Aran
- 2009:
  - 1st, Zermatt-Rothorn run
- 2010:
  - 2nd, World Championship team race (together with Florent Troillet)
  - 2nd, World Championship relay race (together with Florent Troillet, Yannick Ecoeur and Pierre Bruchez)
  - 10th, World Championship combination ranking
  - 3rd, Trophée des Gastlosen (ISMF World Cup), together with Florent Troillet
- 2011:
  - 1st, World Championship sprint
  - 2nd, World Championship relay, together with Yannick Ecoeur, Marcel Theux and Marcel Marti
  - 10th, World Championship vertical race
- 2012:
  - 1st, European Championship relay, together with Marcel Theux, Yannick Ecoeur and Alan Tissières
  - 2nd, World Championship vertical, combined ranking
  - 3rd, European Championship single
  - 3rd, European Championship vertical race
  - 3rd, European Championship team, together with Yannick Ecoeur
  - 2nd, Patrouille de la Maya, together with Florent TroilleT and Yannick Ecoeur

==== Patrouille des Glaciers ====
- 2008: 3rd, together with Ernest Farquet and Jon Andri Willy
- 2010: 1st, together with Yannick Ecoeur and Florent Troillet

==== Trofeo Mezzalama ====
- 2009: 6th, together with Marcel Marti and Yannick Ecoeur
- 2011: 5th, together with Marcel Marti and Yannick Ecoeur

==== Pierra Menta ====
- 2010: 5th, together with Yannick Ecoeur
- 2011: 4th, together with William Bon Mardion

=== Running ===
- 2006:
  - 2nd, Jeizibärg-Lauf & Dérupe Vercorin Trophy
- 2009:
  - 1st, Jeizibärg-Lauf / Upper Valais Running Cup / Valais Mountain Running Cup, Gampel
- 2010:
  - 2nd, Jeizibärg-Lauf / Mountain Running Cup, Gampel
- 2011:
  - 1st, Jeizibärg-Lauf, Gampel
  - 1st (men I), Täschalplauf / Upper Valais Running Cup, Täsch
  - 3rd (M20), Matterhorn run
