= 2011 World Championship of Ski Mountaineering =

The 2011 World Championship of Ski Mountaineering (Italian: Campionato del Mondo di Scialpinismo 2011) were held instead of the originally 9th edition of the European Championships of Ski Mountaineering, why it was the first World Championship in an odd-numbered year, besides the Trofeo Mezzalama in 1975, which was the real first world championship of ski mountaineering. Instead, the 9th edition of the European championships was held in February 2012.

The 2011 World Championship, sanctioned by the International Ski Mountaineering Federation (ISMF) and held in Claut, Italy, lastet from February 19th to 25th, 2011. It was the first edition including a sprint race.

== Results ==
=== Nation ranking and medals ===
(all age groups; without combination ranking medals)

ranking	country	vertical race				individual				team				relay				sprint				
ranking	country	points				points				points				points				points				total points
1	France		2	2	2		2	2	2				1			1	4		3	2	1	2378
2	Switzerland		1	2			1	3	1						3				2	2	5	2264
3	Italy		1	1	1		1		1		1	1	1		2	1			2	2		2229
4	Spain		4	1			3	1	1								2			1	1	2049
5	Austria				1				1											1		1076
6	Poland																				1	1075
7	Germany			1			1												1			730
8	Norway																					488
9	Andorra																					474
10	Czech Republic																					460
11	United States																					396
12	United Kingdom																					293
13	Slovenia																					273
14	Canada																					262
15	Slovakia																					261
16	Japan																					139
17	Sweden																					128
18	Greece																					92
19	Portugal																					30
20	Bulgaria																					28
21	China																					6

=== Team race ===
event held on February 20, 2011

List of the best 10 relay teams by gender (some teams included "Espoirs" level athletes):

==== Women ====
ranking	team	total time
	Nathalie Etzensperger/Marie Troillet	3h 05' 52"
	Roberta Pedranzini/Francesca Martinelli	3h 11' 54"
	Séverine Pont-Combe/Gabrielle Gachet	3h 14' 30"
4	Émilie Gex-Fabry/Mireille Richard	3h 18' 56"
5	Corinne Clos/Martina Valmassoi	3h 29' 50"^{*)}
6	Gemma Arró Ribot/Marta Riba Carlos	3h 30' 19"
7	Cristina Bes Ginesta/Izaskun Zubizarreta	3h 32' 57"
8	Nina Silitch/Janelle Smiley	3h 35' 51"
9	Julie Matteau/Melanie Bernier	3h 49' 15"
10	Anna Figura/Julia Wajda	3h 55' 15"

^{*)} includes 4 penalty minutes

==== Men ====
ranking	team	total time
	Matteo Eydallin/Denis Trento	2h 30' 32"
	Lorenzo Holzknecht/Manfred Reichegger	2h 32' 35"
	Didier Blanc/William Bon Mardion	2h 32' 52"
4	Pietro Lanfranchi/Damiano Lenzi	2h 34' 08"
5	Alexandre Pellicier/Valentin Favre	2h 35' 36"
6	Alexis Sévennec-Verdier/Nicolas Bonnet	2h 39' 02"
7	Alexander Fasser/Jakob Herrmann	2h 39' 46"
8	Marc Pinsach Rubirola/Kílian Jornet Burgada	2h 43' 50"
9	Marc Solá Pastoret/Miguel Caballero Ortega	2h 45' 49"
10	Joan Vilana Díaz/Joan Albós Cavaliere	2h 47' 11"

=== Vertical race ===
event held on February 22, 2011

List of the best 10 participants by gender (incl. "Espoirs" level):

==== Women ====
ranking	participant	total time
	Mireia Miró Varela	0h 27' 34"
	Laëtitia Roux	0h 28' 34"
	Gemma Arró Ribot	0h 30' 41"
4	Nathalie Etzensperger	0h 31' 35"
5	Séverine Pont-Combe	0h 31' 59"
6	Émilie Gex-Fabry	0h 32' 06"
7	Janelle Smiley	0h 32' 23"
8	Lydia Prugger	0h 32' 32"
9	Corinne Clos	0h 33' 10"
10	Mari Fasting	0h 33' 51"

==== Men ====
ranking	participant	total time
	Kílian Jornet Burgada	0h 24' 44"
	Yannick Buffet	0h 24' 48"
	William Bon Mardion	0h 25' 15"
4	Damiano Lenzi	0h 25' 31"
5	Florent Perrier	0h 25?' 33"
6	Marc Pinsach Rubirola	0h 25' 39"
7	Pietro Lanfranchi	0h 25' 42"
8	Nejc Kuhar	0h 25' 43"
9	Ola Berger	0h 25' 54"
10	Martin Anthamatten	0h 26' 05"

=== Sprint ===
event held on February 23, 2011

List of the best 10 participants by gender:

==== Women ====
ranking	participant	qualification	½ final	Final
	(France) Laëtitia Roux	03' 42.20"	03' 40.54"	03' 30.18"
	(Switzerland) Nathalie Etzensperger	03' 41.62"	03' 38.63"	03' 38.81"
	(Switzerland) Gabrielle Gachet	0?' 46.07"	03' 47.42"	03' 45.92"
4	(Switzerland) Mireille Richard	03' 46.31"	04' 04.51"	03' 49.12"
5	(Canada) Melanie Bernier	04' 06.11"	04' 06.73"	04' 18.62"
6	(Spain) Mireia Miró Varela	03' 49.09"	03' 55.82"	04' 28.84"
7	(Poland) Anna Figura	04' 04.80"	03' 59.92"	04' 04.01"
8	(Switzerland) Émilie Gex-Fabry	04' 00.56"	04' 04.52"	04' 08.91"
9	(Austria) Veronika Swidrak	04' 02.90"	04' 10.14"	04' 09.14"
10	(France) Sandrine Favre	03' 58.72"	04' 10.41"	04' 17.69"

==== Men ====
ranking	participant	qualification	¼ final	½ final	Final
	(Switzerland) Martin Anthamatten	03' 07.88"	03' 07.18"	03' 01.00"	03' 02.1"
	(Italy) Robert Antonioli	03' 07.63"	03' 10.68"	03' 00.63"	03' 02.2"
	(Switzerland) Yannick Ecoeur	02' 58.75"	03' 10.63"	03' 02.50"	03' 06.9"
4	(France) Xavier Gachet	03' 00.85"	02' 59.62"	0?' 04.47"	03' 09.6"
5	(France) Alexandre Pellicier	03' 01.23"	03' 08.46"	03' 08.15"	03' 09.6"
6	(Switzerland) Marcel Marti	02' 49.54"	02' 58.35"	03' 07.74"	03' 11.6"
7	(Switzerland) Marcel Theux	03' 04.39"	03' 07.15"	03' 20.11"	03' 17.8"
8	(France) Nicolas Bonnet	03' 15.85"	02' 57,16"	03' 07.76"	03' 19.8
9	(Switzerland) Cédric Rémy	03' 20.79"	03' 11.54"	03' 14.35"	03' 20.7"
10	(Austria) Jakob Herrmann	03' 20.32"	03' 11.6"	03' 42.82"	03' 22.8"

=== Individual race ===
event held on February 24, 2011

List of the best 10 participants by gender:

==== Women ====
ranking	participant	total time
	Mireia Miró Varela	1h 24' 54"
	Laëtitia Roux	1h 27' 17"
	Nathalie Etzensperger	1h 31' 44"
4	Marie Troillet	1h 34' 11"
5	Gabrielle Gachet	1h 34' 16"
6	Émilie Gex-Fabry	1h 37' 00"
7	Mireille Richard	1h 37' 33"
8	Corinne Clos	1h 37' 46"
9	Janelle Smiley	1h 40' 25"
10	Melanie Bernier	1h 41' 08"

==== Men ====
ranking	participant	total time
	Kílian Jornet Burgada	1h 27' 08"
	William Bon Mardion	1h 27' 19"
	Yannick Buffet	1h 27' 38"
4	Didier Blanc	1h 28' 04"
5	Manfred Reichegger	1h 29' 08"
6	Denis Trento	1h 29' 25"
7	Yannick Ecoeur	1h 29' 55"
8	Michele Boscacci	0h 30' 05"
9	Robert Antonioli	1h 30' 53"
10	Marc Pinsach Rubirola	1h 31' 28"

=== Relay race ===
event held on February 25, 2011

List of the best 10 relay teams by gender (some teams included "Espoirs" level athletes):

==== Women ====
ranking	team	total time
	Gachet/Etzensperger/Richard	0h 24' 56"
	S. Favre/É. Favre/Roux	0h 25' 05"
	Bes Ginesta/Arró Ribot/Miró Varela	0h 26' 22"
4	Tasz/Wajda/Figura	0h 28' 09"
5	Valmassoi/Clos/Piccagnoni	0h 28' 20"
6	Swidrak/Eßl/Prugger	0h 28' 35"
7	Smiley/Silitch/Kirkland	0h 28' 52"
8	Carstens/Haukøy/Fasting	0h 30' 37"
9	Gilbert/Lees/Callaghan	0h 34' 42"
10	/ Horibe/Thomas/Mase	0h 38' 11"

==== Men ====
ranking	team	total time
	Reichegger/Antonioli/Trento/Eydallin	0h 26' 35"
	Ecoeur/Theux/Anthamatten/Marti	0h 26' 36"
	D. Blanc/X. Gachet/Buffet/Bon Mardion	0h 27' 28"
4	Pinsach Rubirola/Jornet Burgada/Caballero Ortega/Martín de Villa	0h 28' 15"
5	Stock/Fasser/Rohringer/Jakob Herrmann	0h 29' 22"
6	Reiter/Palzer/Steurer/Lex	0h 29' 41"
7	Šenk/Mikloša/Triler/Kuhar	0h 30' 23"
8	Hovdenak/Berger/O.-E. Tronvoll/Oyberg	0h 30' 43"
9	/ Jonsson/Gund/O. Tronvoll/Almestål	0h 30' 52"
10	Vilana Díaz/J. Albós Cavaliere/D. Albós Cavaliere/Pelegrina Lopez	0h 31' 59"

=== Combination ranking ===
(vertical race, individual and team ranking)

List of the best 10 participants by gender:

==== Women ====
ranking	participant
	Nathalie Etzensperger
	Laëtitia Roux
	Mireia Miró Varela
4	Émilie Gex-Fabry
5	Gabrielle Gachet
6	Mireille Richard
7	Séverine Pont-Combe
8	Corinne Clos
9	Melanie Bernier
10	Marie Troillet

==== Men ====
ranking	participant
	Kílian Jornet Burgada
	William Bon Mardion
	Robert Antonioli
4	Yannick Buffet
5	Denis Trento
6	Manfred Reichegger
7	Damiano Lenzi
8	Didier Blanc
9	Pietro Lanfranchi
10	Marc Pinsach Rubirola
