= Silvia Piccagnoni =

Italian ski mountaineer (born 1993)

Personal information
- Born: 27 May 1993 (age 33) Sondalo, Italy

Sport
- Sport: Skiing
- Club: Sci Club Alta Valtellina

Silvia Piccagnoni (born 27 May 1993) is an Italian ski mountaineer.

Piccagnoni was born in Sondalo. After notable results in youth classes, she participated in the women's senior relay team (together with Martina Valmassoi and Corinne Clos) at the 2011 World Championship of Ski Mountaineering, which finished fifth.

Piccagnoni is member of the Sci Club Alta Valtellina.
