= Philipp Reiter =

German ski mountaineer and runner

Personal information
- Born: 20 July 1991 (age 35) Munich, Germany

Sport
- Sport: Skiing
Medal record
Representing Germany

Philipp Reiter (born 20 July 1991) is a German ski mountaineer, mountain runner and sports photographer. He is member of the German national selection of ski mountaineering.

Reiter was born in Munich. He started ski mountaineering in 2001, and competed for the first time in 2006. He currently lives in Bad Reichenhall, where he visited the Karlsgymnasium. He studies mathematics and biology at the University of Salzburg.

In 2015/2016, he had to take a break due to chronic plantar tendinitis and took up sports photography. Today he accompanies trail running competitions as a photographer and is involved in the family business that produces sustainable clothing. Together with the Spanish photographer Jordi Saragossa, he founded Adventure Bakery, an agency for image content around trail running and mountain sports. He is a brand ambassador for various sports brands and for his current home town Bad Reichenhall. He also coached the Salomon Trailrunning Team, to which he belonged as an athlete for many years. In 2023, he left Salomon and began to work for the Canadian brand Arc'teryx.

Among his sports projects was the crossing of the Alps skiing and running from Vienna to Nice in 36 days (Red Bull Der Lange Weg), and the speed record at the Watzmann east flank in 1:52:55 h in 2018.

== Selected results ==
=== Ski mountaineering ===
- 2011:
  - 6th, World Championship, relay, together with Anton Palzer, Anton Steurer and Konrad Lex
- 2012:
  - 5th, European Championship, relay, together with Josef Rottmoser, Anton Palzer and Alexander Schuster
  - 1st, Olympus Ski Mountaineering Team Race, together with Aronis Platonis

=== Running ===
- 2011:
  - 1st, Zugspitz Supertrail
  - 2nd, 4 Trails
- 2012:
  - 1st, Zugspitz Supertrail
  - 1st, Transalpine Run
- 2013:
  - 1st, Zugspitz Ultratrail
