= Marit Tveite Bystøl =

Norwegian ski mountaineer (born 1981)

Personal information
- Born: 20 November 1981 (age 44)

Sport
- Sport: Skiing

Marit Tveite Bystøl (born 20 November 1981) is a Norwegian ski mountaineer.

== Selected results ==
- 2007:
  - 9th, European Championship team race (together with Bodil Ryste)
- 2008:
  - 4th, World Championship relay race (together with Lene Pedersen, Ellen Blom and Ellen Blom)
  - 5th, World Championship combination ranking
  - 8th, World Championship team race (together with Lene Pedersen)
- 2009:
  - 5th, European Championship relay race (together with Bodil Ryste and Oddrun Brakstad Orset)
  - 6th, European Championship team race (together with Bodil Ryste)
  - 10th, European Championship combination ranking
- 2010:
  - 6th, World Championship relay race (together with Oddrun Brakstad Orset and Malene Haukøy)
  - 7th, World Championship single race
  - 8th, World Championship team race (together with Oddrun Brakstad Orset)

=== Pierra Menta ===
- 2010: 5th, together with Oddrun Brakstad Orset
