= 2007 European Championship of Ski Mountaineering =

The 2007 European Championship of Ski Mountaineering (French: Championnat d'Europe de ski de montagne 2007) was the seventh European Championship of ski mountaineering and was held in Avoriaz, Morzine between the Mont Blanc and the Lac Léman from March 24–28.

The competition was organized by the Fédération française de la montagne et de l’escalade (FFME) ordered by the International Council for Ski Mountaineering Competitions (ISMC) of the Union Internationale des Associations d'Alpinisme (UIAA). About 230 athletes of 21 nations participated. Compared to the 2005 European Championship the vertical race and the relay race event also ranked.

== Results ==
=== Nation ranking and medals ===
(all age groups)

| ranking | country | vertical race | | | | team | | | | individual | | | | relay | | | | |
| ranking | country | points | | | | points | | | | points | | | | points | | | | total points |
|---|---|---|---|---|---|---|---|---|---|---|---|---|---|---|---|---|---|---|
| 1 | France | 1214 | 6 | 2 | | 348 | 1 | 2 | | 344 | 5 | 2 | 4 | 1491 | | 2 | 1 | 3397 |
| 2 | Italy | 961 | 1 | 2 | 5 | 386 | 1 | 1 | | 400 | 1 | 4 | 1 | 1381 | 2 | | | 3128 |
| 3 | Switzerland | 892 | | | | 354 | | | 1 | 344 | | 1 | 1 | 1273 | | 1 | 1 | 2863 |
| 4 | Spain | 871 | 1 | 2 | 2 | 218 | | | | 292 | 2 | | 1 | 999 | 1 | | | 2380 |
| 5 | Germany | 438 | | | | 182 | | | | 296 | | | | 602 | | | | 1518 |
| 6 | Andorra | 450 | | | | 176 | | | | 272 | | | | 480 | | | | 1378 |
| 7 | Czech Republic | 602 | | 2 | | 52 | | | | 120 | | 1 | | 502 | | | 1 | 1276 |
| 8 | Norway | 310 | | | | 204 | | | | 276 | | | | 299 | | | | 1089 |
| 9 | Slovakia | 356 | | | | 50 | | | | 124 | | | | 430 | | | | 960 |
| 10 | Poland | 403 | | | 1 | 52 | | | | 116 | | | 1 | 346 | | | | 917 |
| 11 | Slovenia | 340 | | | | 36 | | | | 112 | | | | 182 | | | | 670 |
| 12 | Romania | 282 | | | | | | | | 128 | | | | 244 | | | | 654 |
| 13 | Greece | 326 | | | | 18 | | | | 108 | | | | 188 | | | | 640 |
| 14 | Sweden | 143 | | | | 80 | | | | 140 | | | | 134 | | | | 497 |
| 15 | Bulgaria | 130 | | | | 10 | | | | | | | | 58 | | | | 198 |
| 16 | Russia | 59 | | | | 8 | | | | 104 | | | | | | | | 171 |
| 17 | Liechtenstein | 108 | | | | | | | | | | | | | | | 108 | |
| 18 | United Kingdom | 33 | | | | 8 | | | | | | | | | | | | 41 |
| 19 | Belgium | 22 | | | | 14 | | | | | | | | | | | | 36 |
| 20 | Croatia | 14 | | | | | | | | | | | | | | | | 14 |
| 21 | Austria | 0 | | | | | | | | | | | | | | | | 0 |

=== Vertical race ===
Event held in Morzine on March 24, 2007

List of the best 10 participants by gender:

==== Women ====
| ranking | participant | total time |
|---|---|---|
| | (France) Laëtitia Roux | 00h48 ' 44.7" |
| | (Italy) Roberta Pedranzini | 00h 48' 04.2" |
| | (Italy) Gloriana Pellissier | 00h 49' 11.3" |
| 4 | (Germany) Barbara Gruber | 00h 49' 45" |
| 5 | (Switzerland) Nathalie Etzensperger | 00h 50' 30.7" |
| 6 | (Switzerland) Catherine Mabillard | 00h 50' 40.9" |
| 7 | (France) Corinne Favre | 00h 51' 11" |
| 8 | (Andorra) Sophie Dusautoir Bertrand | 00h 51' 59.7" |
| 9 | (Italy) Francesca Martinelli | 00h 52' 44.7" |
| 10 | (Italy) Elisa Fleischmann | 00h 53' 04.3" |

==== Men ====
| ranking | participant | total time |
|---|---|---|
| | (France) Florent Perrier | 00h39 ' 48.1" |
| | (Spain) Agustí Roc Amador | 00h40 ' 08.1" |
| | (Spain) Manuel Pérez Brunicardi | 00h40 ' 49.6" |
| 4 | (Switzerland) Sébastien Epiney | 00h40 ' 56.7" |
| 5 | (France) Tony Sbalbi | 00h41 ' 15.3" |
| 6 | (Italy) Lorenzo Holzknecht | 00h41 ' 32" |
| 7 | (Spain) Oscar Roig Iglesias | 00h41 ' 39.6" |
| 8 | (Liechtenstein) Olivier Nägele | 00h41 ' 54" |
| 9 | (Andorra) Ludovic Albós Cavaliere | 00h42 ' 02" |
| 10 | (Spain) Javier Martín de Villa | 0042h ' 21.6" |

=== Team ===
Event held in Morzine on March 25, 2007

List of the best 10 teams by gender:

==== Women ====
| ranking | team | total time |
|---|---|---|
| | (Italy) Martinelli/Pedranzini | 02h 31' 14.8" |
| | (France) Favre/Lathuraz | 02h 37' 20.2" |
| | (Switzerland) Mabillard/Etzensperger | 02h 39' 47.8" |
| 4 | (Germany) Koch/J. Graßl | 02h 44' 27.1" |
| 5 | (Italy) Lunger/Fleischmann | 02h 45' 54" |
| 6 | (Switzerland) M. Troillet/Magnenat | 02h 46' 46.8" |
| 7 | (Norway) Pedersen/Blom | 03h 02' 41.7" |
| 8 | (Spain) Zubizarreta Guerendiain/Arró Ribot | 03h 05' 35" |
| 9 | (Norway) Ryste/Tveite Bystøl | 03h 10' 37" |
| 10 | (Andorra) Tort Gendrau/Tudel Cuberes | 03h 30' 00.1" |

==== Men ====
| ranking | team | total time |
|---|---|---|
| | (France) Perrier/Gachet | 01h 56' 56.8" |
| | (France) Pellicier/Bon Mardion | 01h 58' 00.7" |
| | (Italy) Giacomelli/J. Pellissier | 01h 59' 21.6" |
| 4 | (Italy) Reichegger/Brunod | 02h 00' 28.4" |
| 5 | (Switzerland) F. Troillet/Hug | 02h 01' 29.9" |
| 6 | (Switzerland) A. Rey/Ecoeur | 02h 04' 08.1" |
| 7 | (France) Buffet/B. Blanc | 02h 04' 20.7" |
| 8 | (France) Premat/Anselmet | 02h 04' 24.8" |
| 9 | (France) P. Blanc/Sbalbi | 02h 06' 41.9" |
| 10 | (Spain) Pérez Brunicardi/J. Bes Ginesta | 02h 07' 08.6" |

=== Relay ===
Event held in Morzine on March 26, 2007.

List of the best 10 teams by gender:

==== Women ====
| ranking | team | total time |
|---|---|---|
| | (Italy) Gloriana Pellissier/Francesca Martinelli/Roberta Pedranzini | 01h 02' 14.8" |
| | (France) Corinne Favre/Véronique Lathuraz/Laëtitia Roux | 01h 03' 16.6" |
| | (Switzerland) Gabrielle Magnenat/Catherine Mabillard/Nathalie Etzensperger | 01h 05' 42.8" |
| 4 | (Germany) Judith Graßl/Silvia Treimer/Stefanie Koch | 01h 10' 14.7" |
| 5 | (Norway) Ellen Blom/Bodil Ryste/Lene Pedersen | 01h 11' 18.7" |
| 6 | (Spain) Gemma Arró Ribot/Maribel Martín de la Iglesia/Izaskun Zubizarreta Guerendiain | 01h 13' 23.8" |
| 7 | (Andorra) Neus Tort Gendrau/Sophie Dusautoir Bertrand/Ariadna Tudel Cuberes | 01h 14' 56.9" |

==== Men ====
| ranking | team | total time |
|---|---|---|
| | (Italy) Dennis Brunod/Denis Trento/Manfred Reichegger/Guido Giacomelli | 01h 07' 18.6" |
| | (Switzerland) Alain Rey/Florent Troillet/Yannick Ecoeur/Alexander Hug | 01h 08' 22.7" |
| | (France) Yannick Buffet/Bertrand Blanc/Tony Sbalbi/Fabien Anselmet | 01h 10' 44" |
| 4 | (Spain) Javier Martín de Villa/Agustí Roc Amador/Marc Solá Pastoret/Manuel Pérez Brunicardi | 01h 11' 42.3" |
| 5 | (Germany) Toni Steurer/Konrad Lex/Stefan Klinger/Martin Echtler | 01h 16' 30" |
| 6 | (Sweden) Patrik Nordin/André Jonsson/Joakim Halvarsson/John Bergstedt | 01h 16' 35.7" |
| 7 | (Andorra) Toni Casals Rueda/Xavier Capdevila Romero/Joan Albós Cavaliere/Xavier Comas Guixé | 01h 17' 32.1" |
| 8 | (Norway) Ola Berger/Ola Herje Hovdenak/Martin Bartnes/Ove-Erik Tronvoll | 01h 18' 12.1" |
| 9 | (Romania) Dimitru Frâncu/Rareş Manea/Ionuţ Găliţeanu/Silviu Manea | 01h 19' 18.7" |
| 10 | (Slovakia) Milan Madaj/Matúš Daňko/Jozef Hlavco/Juraj Laštík | 01h 19' 36.9" |

=== Individual ===
Event held on March 28, 2007

List of the best 10 participants by gender:

==== Women ====
| ranking | participant | total time |
|---|---|---|
| | (France) Laëtitia Roux | 01h 39' 47.2" |
| | (Italy) Roberta Pedranzini | 01h 46' 28.3" |
| | (Italy) Gloriana Pellissier | 01h 47' 51.8" |
| 4 | (Italy) Francesca Martinelli | 01h 49' 02.5" |
| 5 | (Switzerland) Nathalie Etzensperger | 01h 49' 23.3" |
| 6 | (Italy) Elisa Fleischmann | 01h 51' 20.5" |
| 7 | (Switzerland) Gabrielle Magnenat | 01h 54' 59.2" |
| 8 | (Germany) Judith Graßl | 01h 55' 08.6" |
| 9 | (Switzerland) Catherine Mabillard | 01h 56' 26.9" |
| 10 | (Switzerland) Émilie Gex-Fabry | 01h 57' 23.4" |

==== Men ====
| ranking | participant | total time |
|---|---|---|
| | (France) Florent Perrier | 01h 23' 09.8" |
| | (Italy) Dennis Brunod | 01h 23' 24.2" |
| | (France) William Bon Mardion | 01h 23' 51.3" |
| 4 | (Italy) Manfred Reichegger | 01h 24' 46" |
| 5 | (Switzerland) Florent Troillet | 01h 25' 04.8" |
| 6 | (France) Grégory Gachet | 01h 27' 02.2" |
| 7 | (France) Alexandre Pellicier | 01h 27' 17.9" |
| 8 | (Italy) Lorenzo Holzknecht | 01h 27' 34.6" |
| 9 | (Italy) Guido Giacomelli | 01h 28' 41.3" |
| 10 | (Spain) Javier Martín de Villa | 01h 28' 50" |

=== Combination ranking ===
combined ranking (results of the individual races and team races events)

List of the best 10 participants by gender:

==== Women ====
| ranking | participant |
|---|---|
| | (Italy) Roberta Pedranzini |
| | (Italy) Francesca Martinelli |
| | (Switzerland) Nathalie Etzensperger |
| 4 | (Italy) Elisa Fleischmann |
| 5 | (France) Véronique Lathuraz |
| 6 | (Switzerland) Catherine Mabillard |
| 7 | (Germany) Judith Graßl |
| 8 | (Switzerland) Gabrielle Magnenat |
| 9 | (Switzerland) Marie Troillet |
| 10 | (Germany) Stefanie Koch |

==== Men ====
| ranking | participant |
|---|---|
| | (France) Florent Perrier |
| | (France) William Bon Mardion |
| | (Italy) Dennis Brunod |
| 4 | (France) Grégory Gachet |
| 5 | (Italy) Guido Giacomelli |
| 6 | (France) Alexandre Pellicier |
| 7 | (Switzerland) Florent Troillet |
| 8 | (Italy) Manfred Reichegger |
| 9 | (Switzerland) Alexander Hug |
| 10 | (Spain) Manuel Pérez Brunicardi |
