= Toni Casals Rueda =

Andorran ski mountaineer

Personal information
- Born: April 3, 1980 (age 46)

Sport
- Sport: Skiing
Medal record
Representing Andorra

Toni Casals Rueda (born April 3, 1980) from Andorra la Vella is an Andorran ski mountaineer.

Casals started ski mountaineering in 1996 and competed first in the Open Font Blanca race in 1997.

== Selected results ==
- 2004:
  - 8th, World Championship relay race (together with Joan Vilana Díaz, Manel Pelegrina Lopez and Xavier Capdevila Romero)
- 2005:
  - 7th, European Championship relay race (together with Xavier Comas Guixé, Xavier Capdevila Romero and Joan Vilana Díaz)
- 2006:
  - 8th, World Championship relay race (together with Xavier Capdevila Romero, Joan Albós Cavaliere and Joan Vilana Díaz)
- 2007:
  - 7th, European Championship relay race (together with Xavier Capdevila Romero, Joan Albós Cavaliere and Xavier Comas Guixé)
- 2008:
  - 1st, Open Font Blanca (together with Joan Vilana Díaz)
- 2009:
  - 6th, European Championship relay race (together with Joan Albós Cavaliere, Joan Vilana Díaz and Xavier Capdevila Romero)
- 2010:
  - 8th, World Championship relay race (together with Joan Albós Cavaliere, Joan Vilana Díaz and Xavier Comas Guixé)
