= Marta Riba =

Spanish ski mountaineer (born 1972)

Personal information
- Full name: Marta Riba Carlos
- Born: 11 April 1972 (age 54)

Sport
- Sport: Skiing
- Club: Club Esqui Pobla
Medal record
Ski mountaineering
Silver medal – second place	2012 European Championship	Relay

Marta Riba Carlos (born 11 April 1972) from La Pobleta de Bellveí is a Spanish ski mountaineer. She is member of the Club Esqui Pobla.

== Selected results ==
- 2011:
  - 6th, World Championship, team, together with Gemma Arró Ribot
- 2012:
  - 2nd, European Championship, relay, together with Gemma Arró Ribot and Mireia Miró Varela
  - 6th, European Championship, team, together with Maria Fargues Gimeno

=== Patrouille des Glaciers ===
- 2010: 9th, together with Gemma Arró Ribot and Naila Jornet Burgada

=== Pierra Menta ===
- 2011: 6th, together with Izaskun Zubizarreta Guerendiain
- 2012: 6th, together with Anna Comet Pascua
- 2016: 5th, together with Ida Nilsson
