= Gemma Arró =

Catalan ski mountaineer

Personal information
- Full name: Gemma Arró Ribot
- Born: 28 August 1980 (age 45) Puigcerdà, Spain

Sport
- Sport: Skiing
Medal record
Ski mountaineering
Representing Spain
World Championships
Bronze medal – third place	2011 World Championship	Vertical race
Bronze medal – third place	2011 World Championship	Relay
European Championships
Silver medal – second place	2012 European Championship	Team
Silver medal – second place	2012 European Championship	Relay
Bronze medal – third place	2012 European Championship	Vertical race

Gemma Arró Ribot (born 28 August 1980) is a Catalan ski mountaineer, born in Puigcerdà. She started ski mountaineering in 2003 and competed for the first time at the Cronoescalada Pas de la Casa race.

== Selected results ==
- 2006:
  - 5th, World Championship relay race together with Naila Jornet Burgada, Izaskun Zubizarreta Guerendiain and Cristina Bes Ginesta
- 2007:
  - 6th, European Championship relay race together with Maribel Martín de la Iglesia and Izaskun Zubizarreta Guerendiain
  - 8th, European Championship team race together with Izaskun Zubizarreta Guerendiain
- 2008:
  - 5th, World Championship relay race together with Cristina Bes Ginesta, Izaskun Zubizarreta Guerendiain und Emma Roca Rodríguez
- 2009:
  - 4th, European Championship relay race together with Mireia Miró Varela and Izaskun Zubizarreta Guerendiain
  - 7th European Championship vertical race
- 2010:
  - 4th, World Championship relay race (together with Mireia Miró Varela and Cristina Bes Ginesta)
  - 4th, World Championship team race (together with Mireia Miró Varela)
  - 6th, World Championship single race
  - 6th, World Championship combination ranking
  - 8th, World Championship vertical race
- 2011:
  - 3rd, World Championship vertical race
  - 3rd, World Championship relay (together with Cristina Bes Ginesta and Mireia Miró Varela)
  - 6th, World Championship team race (together with Marta Riba Carlos)
- 2012:
  - 2nd, European Championship team, together with Mireia Miró Varela
  - 2nd, European Championship relay, together with Marta Riba Carlos and Mireia Miró Varela
  - 3rd, European Championship vertical race
  - 5th, World Championship vertical, combined ranking
  - 4th, 2012 Crested Butte Ski Mountaineering Race, sprint, single and total ranking

=== Patrouille des Glaciers ===
- 2010: 9th (and 5th in the "civilian women" ranking), together with Marta Riba Carlos and Naila Jornet Burgada
