= Ingvild Ryggen Carstens =

Norwegian ski mountaineer and heptathlete (born 1980)

Personal information
- Full name: Ingvild Ryggen Kristinsdatter Carstens
- Born: 14 October 1980 (age 45) Trondheim, Norway

Sport
- Sport: Skiing

Ingvild Ryggen Kristinsdatter Carstens (born 14 October 1980) is a Norwegian ski mountaineer and former heptathlete.

Carstens hails from Trondheim, and attended the Trondheim Cathedral School. Currently she lives in Innsbruck, Austria, where she studied at the university.

== Selected results ==
Together with Malene Haukøy and Mari Fasting, she participated in the Norwegian women's relay team at the 2011 World Championship of Ski Mountaineering, which finished eighth.

As a heptathlete she achieved 4.478 points as her personal best; in May 2004 in Las Vegas.
