= Nathalie Etzensperger =

Swiss ski mountaineer and long-distance runner

Nathalie Etzensperger-Nanzer
Personal information
- Born: 6 August 1968 (age 57) Gamsen VS, Switzerland

Sport
- Sport: Skiing
Medal record
Ski mountaineering
Representing Switzerland
World Championships
Gold medal – first place	2008 World Championship	Relay
Gold medal – first place	2011 World Championship	Team
Gold medal – first place	2011 World Championship	Relay
Silver medal – second place	2006 World Championship	Relay
Silver medal – second place	2008 World Championship	Team
Silver medal – second place	2010 World Championship	Team
Silver medal – second place	2010 World Championship	Relay
Silver medal – second place	2011 World Championship	Sprint
Bronze medal – third place	2008 World Championship	Vertical race
Bronze medal – third place	2008 World Championship	long distance
Bronze medal – third place	2011 World Championship	Single
European Championships
Silver medal – second place	2009 European Championship	Team
Silver medal – second place	2009 European Championship	Relay
Bronze medal – third place	2007 European Championship	Team
Bronze medal – third place	2007 European Championship	Relay

Nathalie Etzensperger-Nanzer, née Nanzer (born 6 August 1968), is a female Swiss ski mountaineer and long-distance runner.

Etzensperger was born in Gamsen, where she grew up. She started top-class sports at the age of 24 years, and is married with three children.

== Selected results ==
=== Ski mountaineering ===
- 2006:
  - 2nd, World Championship relay race (together with Gabrielle Magnenat, Catherine Mabillard and Séverine Pont-Combe)
  - 7th, World Championship vertical race
- 2007:
  - 3rd, European Championship team race (together with Catherine Mabillard)
  - 3rd, European Championship relay race (together with Gabrielle Magnenat and Catherine Mabillard)
  - 3rd, European Championship combination ranking
  - 5th, European Championship single race
  - 5th, European Championship vertical race
- 2008:
  - 1st, World Championship relay race (together with Gabrielle Magnenat, Marie Troillet and Séverine Pont-Combe)
  - 2nd, World Championship team race (together with Séverine Pont-Combe)
  - 3rd, World Championship vertical race
  - 3rd, World Championship long distance
  - 3rd, World Championship combination ranking
  - 4th, World Championship single race
- 2009:
  - 2nd, European Championship team race (together with Gabrielle Magnenat)
  - 2nd, European Championship relay race (together with Gabrielle Magnenat and Séverine Pont-Combe)
  - 3rd, European Championship combination ranking
  - 4th, European Championship single race
  - 5th, European Championship vertical race
  - 1st, Trophée des Gastlosen, together with Séverine Pont-Combe
- 2010:
  - 2nd, World Championship relay race (together with Marie Troillet and Gabrielle Magnenat)
  - 2nd, World Championship team race (together with Marie Troillet)
  - 3rd, World Championship combination ranking
  - 4th, World Championship single race
  - 7th, World Championship vertical race
- 2011:
  - 1st, World Championship team race (together with Marie Troillet)
  - 1st, World Championship relay race (together with Gabrielle Gachet, née Magnenat, and Mireille Richard)
  - 1st, World Championship vertical, total ranking
  - 2nd, World Championship sprint
  - 3rd, World Championship single race
  - 4th, World Championship vertical race
- 2012:
  - 2nd, Patrouille de la Maya, together with Marie Troillet and Gabrielle Gachet, née Magnenat

==== Patrouille des Glaciers ====
- 2004: 5th, together with Lucia Näfen and Brigitte Wolf
- 2008: 1st and course record, together with Gabrielle Magnenat and Séverine Pont-Combe
- 2010: 1st and course record, together with Émilie Gex-Fabry and Marie Troillet

==== Pierra Menta ====
- 2008: 1st, together with Laëtitia Roux

==== Trofeo Mezzalama ====
- 2011: 2nd, together with Laëtitia Roux and Mireia Miró Varela

=== Running ===
- 2001:
  - 1st, Jeizibärg-Lauf, Gampel
- 2004:
  - 1st, Zermatt marathon
  - 1st (women I), Jeizibärg-Lauf, Gampel
  - 3rd (F30), Matterhorn run
- 2005:
  - 1st and course record, Aletsch half marathon
  - 1st (women I), Jeizibärg-Lauf, Gampel
  - 1st, Jeizibärg-Lauf & Dérupe Trophy
- 2006:
  - 1st, Aletsch half marathon
  - 2nd (women II), Jeizibärg-Lauf, Gampel
    Etzensperger also competed in the 2006 European Mountain Running Championship.
- 2007:
  - 2nd, Jeizibärg-Lauf, Gampel
- 2008:
  - 1st (women 1) Jeizibärg-Lauf / Valais Mountain Running Championship, Gampel
  - 1st (women 1), Dérupe Vercorin
  - 2nd (F40), Matterhorn run
- 2009:
  - 1st (F40), Matterhorn run
- 2010:
  - 3rd (F40), Matterhorn run
