= Sophie Dusautoir =

Andorran ski mountaineer

Personal information
- Full name: Sophie Dusautoir Bertrand
- Born: 5 June 1972 (age 54) Andorra la Vella, Andorra

Sport
- Sport: Ski mountaineering
Medal record
Ski mountaineering
Representing Andorra
European Championships
Bronze medal – third place	2009 Alpago	Team

Sophie Dusautoir Bertrand (Note: In this Spanish name, the first or paternal surname is Dusautoir and the second or maternal family name is Bertrand.) (born 5 June 1972) is an Andorran ski mountaineer.

Dusautoir was born in Andorra la Vella. She started ski mountaineering in 2002 and competed first in the Cronoescalada Pas de la Casa race in 2005.

== Selected results ==
- 2006:
  - 2nd, Spanish Championship vertical race
- 2007:
  - 4th, Traça Catalana race
  - 7th, European Championship relay race (together with Neus Tort Gendrau and Ariadna Tudel Cuberes)
  - 8th, European Championship vertical race
- 2008:
  - 9th, World Championship vertical tace
- 2009:
  - 3rd, European Championship team race (together with Ariadna Tudel Cuberes)
  - 8th, European Championship single race
- 2010:
  - 5th, World Championship single race
  - 5th, World Championship vertical race
  - 5th, World Championship combination ranking
  - 6th, World Championship team race (together with Ariadna Tudel Cuberes)
  - 8th, World Championship relay race (together with Ariadna Tudel Cuberes and Maria Segura Lanao)

=== Patrouille des Glaciers ===
- 2008: 5th ("seniors I" class ranking), mixed team together with Marie Troillet and Rico Elmer
- 2010: 3rd, (and 1st in the "civilian women" ranking), together with Andréa Zimmermann and Catherine Mabillard
