= Martina Valmassoi =

Italian ski mountaineer (born 1989)

Personal information
- Born: 26 July 1989 (age 36) Pieve di Cadore, Italy

Sport
- Sport: Skiing
Medal record
Ski mountaineering
Bronze medal – third place	2012 European Championship	Relay

Martina Valmassoi (born 26 July 1989 in Pieve di Cadore) is an Italian ski mountaineer.

== Selected results ==
- 2011:
  - 5th, World Championship, relay, together with Corinne Clos and Silvia Piccagnoni
  - 5th, World Championship team, together with Corinne Clos
  - 5th, Pierra Menta, together with Mireille Richard
- 2012:
  - 3rd, European Championship, relay, together with Gloriana Pellissier and Elena Nicolini
  - 4th, European Championship, together with Corinne Clos
  - 10th, European Championship, sprint
