= Alexis Sévennec-Verdier =

French ski mountaineer (born 1987)

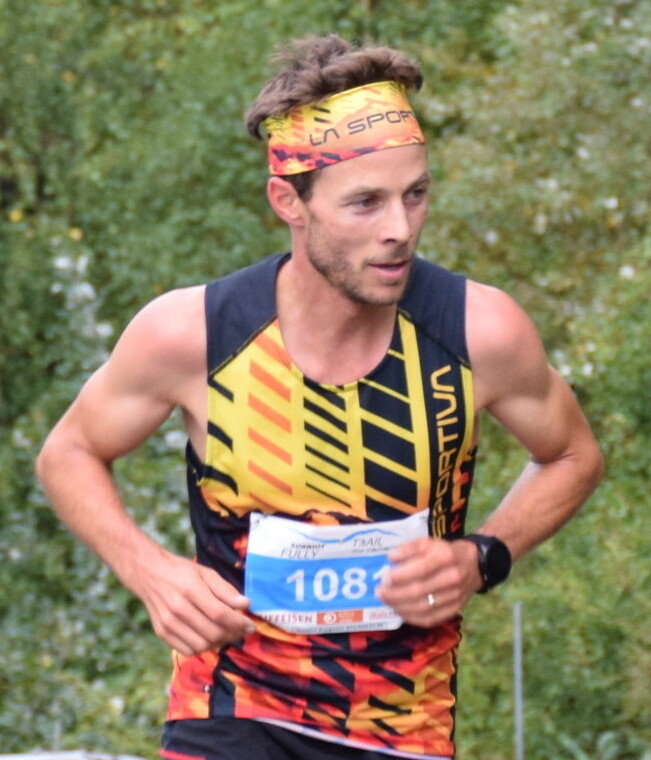

Personal information
- Born: 8 April 1987 (age 39)

Sport
- Sport: Skiing
Medal record
Representing France
Ski mountaineering
Silver medal – second place	2012 European Championship	Relay
World Military Games
Gold medal – first place	2017 Sochi	Individual
Silver medal – second place	2017 Sochi	Team race
Silver medal – second place	2017 Sochi	Team

Alexis Sévennec-Verdier (born 8 April 1987) from La Tour-du-Pin is a French ski mountaineer and skyrunner.

== Selected results ==
- 2011:
  - 6th, World Championship, team, together with Nicolas Bonnet
- 2012:
  - 2nd, European Championship relay, together with Valentin Favre, Yannick Buffet and William Bon Mardion
  - 5th, European Championship, individual
  - 1st, Patrouille de la Maya, together with Valentin Favre and Kílian Jornet Burgada

=== Pierra Menta ===
- 2011: 10th, together with Xavier Gachet
- 2012: 4th, together with Valentin Favre

=== Trofeo Mezzalama ===
- 2011, 6th, together with Grégory Gachet and Xavier Gachet

His running results include first place in the Mamores VK and second place in the Ring of Steall Skyrace in 2016.
