= Alan Tissières =

Swiss ski mountaineer (born 1991)

Personal information
- Born: 31 August 1991 (age 35) Praz-de-Fort, Switzerland

Sport
- Sport: Skiing
Medal record
Men's ski mountaineering
Representing Switzerland
European Championships
Gold medal – first place	2012 France	Relay

Alan Tissières (born 31 August 1991) is a Swiss ski mountaineer.

Tissières was born in Praz-de-Fort.

== Selected results ==
- 2010:
  - 3rd (juniors), Trophée des Gastlosen (ISMF World Cup), together with David Salamin
- 2012:
  - 1st, European Championship, relay, together with Martin Anthamatten, Yannick Ecoeur and Marcel Theux
  - 10th, European Championship, sprint
