= Yannick Ecoeur =

Swiss ski mountaineer and mountain runner (born 1981)

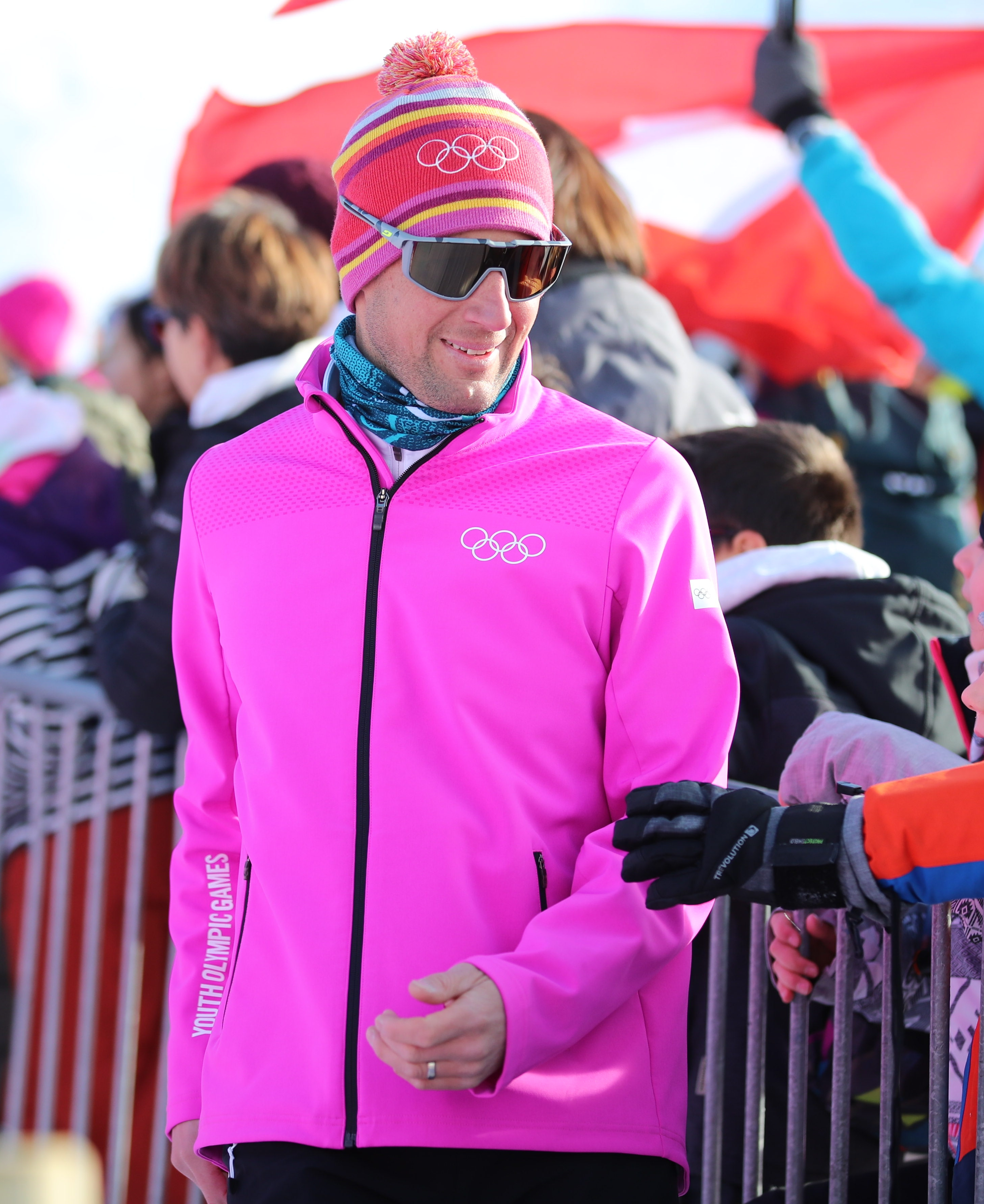

Personal information
- Born: 23 August 1981 (age 44) Martigny VS, Switzerland

Sport
- Sport: Skiing
Medal record
Ski mountaineering
Representing Switzerland
World Championships
Silver medal – second place	2010 World Championship	Relay
Silver medal – second place	2011 World Championship	Relay
Bronze medal – third place	2011 World Championship	Sprint
European Championships
Gold medal – first place	2012 European Championship	Relay
Silver medal – second place	2005 European Championship	Relay
Silver medal – second place	2007 European Championship	Relay
Bronze medal – third place	2009 European Championship	Relay
Bronze medal – third place	2012 European Championship	Team

Yannick Ecoeur (born 23 August 1981) is a Swiss ski mountaineer and mountain runner.

Ecoeur was born in Martigny VS. He started ski mountaineering in 2003 and has been member of the national team since 2005. At the 2020 Winter Youth Olympics he acted as Athlete Rolemodel for Ski Mountaineering.

== Selected results ==
=== Ski mountaineering ===
- 2005:
  - 2nd, European Championship relay race (together with Alexander Hug, Christian Pittex and Jean-Yves Rey)
  - 10th, European Championship team race (together with Emmanuel Vaudan)
- 2006:
  - 1st, Swiss Championship single race
  - 3rd, Trophée des Gastlosen, together with Florent Troillet
  - 9th, World Championship team race (together with Alain Rey)
- 2007:
  - 2nd, European Championship relay race (together with Alain Rey, Florent Troillet and Alexander Hug)
  - 6th, European Championship team race (together with Alain Rey)
- 2009:
  - 3rd, European Championship relay race (together with Florent Troillet, Marcel Marti and Pierre Bruchez)
  - 7th, European Championship team race (together with Marcel Marti)
  - 8th, European Championship single race
- 2010:
  - 2nd, World Championship relay race (together with Florent Troillet, Martin Anthamatten and Pierre Bruchez)
  - 9th, World Championship team race (together with Marcel Marti)
  - 10th, World Championship single race
- 2011:
  - 2nd, World Championship relay, together with Marcel Theux, Martin Anthamatten and Marcel Marti
  - 3rd, World Championship sprint
  - 7th, World Championship single race
- 2012:
  - 1st, European Championship relay, together with Martin Anthamatten, Marcel Theux and Alan Tissières
  - 3rd, European Championship team, together with Martin Anthamatten
  - 4th, European Championship sprint
  - 4th, World Championship vertical, combined ranking
  - 9th, European Championship single
  - 2nd, Patrouille de la Maya, together with Martin Anthamatten and Florent Troillet

==== Trofeo Mezzalama ====
- 2005: 5th, together with Stéphane Gay and Didier Moret
- 2007: 8th, together with Alain Rey and Ernest Farquet
- 2009: 6th, together with Marcel Marti and Martin Anthamatten
- 2011: 5th, together with Martin Anthamatten and Marcel Marti

=== Patrouille des Glaciers ===
- 2006: 3rd (and 1st in international military teams ranking), together with Cpl Rico Elmer and Pvt E-2 Florent Troillet
- 2008: 7th (and 1st in the international military teams ranking), together with Garde-frontière Pierre Bruchez and Garde-frontière Marcel Marti
- 2010: 1st, together with Martin Anthamatten and Florent Troillet

==== Pierra Menta ====
- 2006: 8th, together with Alain Rey
- 2008: 7th, together with Reynold Ginier
- 2009: 9th, together with Pierre Bruchez
- 2010: 5th, together with Martin Anthamatten
- 2011: 6th, together with Valentin Favre
- 2012: 6th, together with Yannick Buffet

=== Running ===
- 2008:
  - 2nd, Dérupe Vercorin
