= 2010 World Championship of Ski Mountaineering =

The 2010 World Championship of Ski Mountaineering (Catalan: Campionats del Món d’Esquí de Muntanya 2010) was the first World Championship of Ski Mountaineering sanctioned by the International Ski Mountaineering Federation (ISMF), successor organization of the International Council for Ski Mountaineering Competitions (ISMC). The competition was held in the skiing area of Gran Valira in the Pyrenees, Andorra, from March 1 to March 6, 2010. This was decided by the ISMC in 2006. The event was supported by the Federació Andorrana de Muntanyisme (FAM) and the Club Pirinenc Andorrà (CPA). Andorra was also venue of the European Championship of Ski Mountaineering in 2005.

Compared to the 2008 World Championship a long distance race was not held in Andorra.

== Results ==
=== Nation ranking and medals ===
(all age groups)

| ranking | country | vertical race | | | | individual | | | | team | | | | relay | | | | |
| ranking | country | points | | | | points | | | | points | | | | points | | | | total points |
|---|---|---|---|---|---|---|---|---|---|---|---|---|---|---|---|---|---|---|
| 1 | Italy | | 1 | 5 | 1 | | 1 | 4 | 4 | | 1 | | 2 | | 3 | | | 5961 |
| 2 | France | | 1 | 2 | 1 | | 2 | 2 | 2 | | 1 | | | | | | 2 | 4926 |
| 3 | Switzerland | | 2 | | 1 | | 2 | 1 | 1 | | | 2 | | | | 3 | | 4549 |
| 4 | Spain | | 3 | | 1 | | 1 | 1 | 1 | | | | | | | | | 4221 |
| 5 | Andorra | | | | | | | | | | | | | | | | | 1576 |
| 6 | Austria | | | | | | 1 | | | | | | | | | | 1 | 1566 |
| 7 | Germany | | 1 | | 1 | | 1 | | | | | | | | | | | 1064 |
| 8 | Norway | | | | | | | | | | | | | | | | | 935 |
| 9 | United States | | | | | | | | | | | | | | | | | 838 |
| 10 | Poland | | | | | | | | | | | | | | | | | 561 |
| 11 | Slovenia | | | | | | | | | | | | | | | | | 467 |
| 12 | Czech Republic | | | | 1 | | | | | | | | | | | | | 443 |
| 13 | Slovakia | | | | | | | | | | | | | | | | | 413 |
| 14 | Canada | | | | | | | | | | | | | | | | | 375 |
| 15 | Japan | | | | | | | | | | | | | | | | | 196 |
| 16 | United Kingdom | | | | | | | | | | | | | | | | | 99 |
| 17 | China | | | | | | | | | | | | | | | | | 98 |
| 18 | Sweden | | | | | | | | | | | | | | | | | 91 |
| 19 | Chile | | | | | | | | | | | | | | | | | 61 |
| 20 | Argentina | | | | | | | | | | | | | | | | | 26 |
| 21 | South Korea | | | | | | | | | | | | | | | | | 14 |
| 22 | Bulgaria | | | | | | | | | | | | | | | | | 0 |
| 23 | Belgium | | | | | | | | | | | | | | | | | 0 |

=== Vertical race ===
event held on March 1, 2010

List of the best 10 participants by gender (incl. "Espoirs" level):

==== Women ====
| ranking | participant | total time |
|---|---|---|
| | Roberta Pedranzini | 0h 48' 25" |
| | Laëtitia Roux | 0h 49' 24" |
| | Francesca Martinelli | 0h 49' 49" |
| 4 | Mireia Miró Varela | 0h 50' 11" |
| 5 | Sophie Dusautoir Bertrand | 0h 50' 47" |
| 6 | Lydia Prugger | 0h 51' 27" |
| 7 | Nathalie Etzensperger | 0h 51' 48" |
| 8 | Gemma Arró Ribot | 0h 51' 56" |
| 9 | Monique Merrill | 0h 52' 52" |
| 10 | Victoria Kreuzer | 0h 52' 59" |

==== Men ====
| ranking | participant | total time |
|---|---|---|
| | Kílian Jornet Burgada | 0h 39' 50" |
| | Dennis Brunod | 0h 39' 57" |
| | Florent Perrier | 0h 40' 04" |
| 4 | Manfred Reichegger | 0h 40' 21" |
| 5 | Didier Blanc | 0h 40' 31" |
| 6 | Damiano Lenzi | 0h 40' 40" |
| 7 | Marc Pinsach Rubirola | 0h 41' 12" |
| 8 | Florent Troillet | 0h 41' 40"*) |
| 9 | Tony Sbalbi | 0h 41' 46" |
| 10 | Grégory Gachet | 0h 41' 56" |

*) incl. 30 penalty seconds

=== Individual ===
event held on March 3, 2010

List of the best 10 participants by gender:

==== Women ====
| ranking | participant | total time |
|---|---|---|
| | Laëtitia Roux | 1h 48' 49" |
| | Roberta Pedranzini | 1h 49' 20" |
| | Francesca Martinelli | 1h 53' 36" |
| 4 | Nathalie Etzensperger | 1h 57' 51" |
| 5 | Sophie Dusautoir Bertrand | 2h 00' 25" |
| 6 | Gemma Arró Ribot | 2h 03' 27" |
| 7 | Marit Tveite Bystøl | 2h 05' 19" |
| 8 | Silvia Rocca | 2h 05' 30" |
| 9 | Monique Merrill | 2h 06' 11" |
| 10 | Marie Troillet | 2h 06' 29" |

==== Men ====
| ranking | participant | total time |
|---|---|---|
| | Florent Troillet | 1h 30' 50" |
| | Kílian Jornet Burgada | 1h 30' 54" |
| | Didier Blanc | 1h 31' 41" |
| 4 | Manfred Reichegger | 1h 31' 45" |
| 5 | Matteo Eydallin | 1h 33' 12" |
| 6 | Florent Perrier | 1h 33' 48" |
| 7 | Damiano Lenzi | 1h 34' 53" |
| 8 | William Bon Mardion | 1h 37' 14" |
| 9 | Marc Pinsach Rubirola | 1h 37' 40" |
| 10 | Yannick Ecoeur | 1h 38' 12" |

=== Team ===
event held on March 5, 2010

List of the best 10 relay teams by gender (some teams included "Espoirs" level athletes):

==== Women ====
| ranking | team | total time |
|---|---|---|
| | Pedranzini/Martinelli | 2h 50' 17" |
| | Troillet/Etzensperger | 2h 59' 16" |
| | Clos/Rocca | 3h 02' 13" |
| 4 | Arró Ribot/Miró Varela | 3h 02' 45" |
| 5 | Prugger/Eßl | 3h 06' 02" |
| 6 | Dusautoir Bertrand/Tudel Cuberes | 3h 09' 40" |
| 7 | Fulywer/Merrill | 3h 28' 36" |
| 8 | Brakstad Orset/Tveite Bystøl | 3h 30' 24" |
| 9 | Matteau/Bernier | 3h 33' 41" |
| 10 | Kirkland/Cook Silitch | 3h 40' 55" |

==== Men ====
| ranking | team | total time |
|---|---|---|
| | Perrier/D. Blanc | 2h 14' 54" |
| | Anthamatten/Troillet | 2h 16' 50" |
| | Holzknecht/Lenzi | 2h 18' 23" |
| 4 | Pellicier/Bon Mardion | 2h 19' 33" |
| 5 | Lanfranchi/Pedrini | 2h 21' 11"*) |
| 6 | Reichegger/Brunod | 2h 21' 13" |
| 7 | Sbalbi/Gachet | 2h 21' 24" |
| 8 | Jornet Burgada/Pinsach Rubirola | 2h 23' 06" |
| 9 | Marti/Ecoeur | 2h 24' 39" |
| 10 | Kuhar/Šenk | 2h 28' 31" |

*) incl. 1 penalty minute

=== Relay ===
event held on March 6, 2010

List of the best 10 relay teams by gender (some teams included "Espoirs" level athletes):

==== Women ====
| ranking | team | total time |
|---|---|---|
| | Francesca Martinelli/Rocca/Pedranzini | 0h 40' 38" |
| | Etzensberger/Magnenat/Troillet | 0h 41' 50" |
| | Prugger/Eßl/Swidrak | 0h 43' 11" |
| 4 | Gemma Arró Ribot/Bes Ginesta/Miró Varela | 0h 43' 37" |
| 5 | Fabre/S. Favre/Roux | 0h 43' 38" |
| 6 | Tveite Bystøl/Haukøy/Brakstad Orset | 0h 46' 40" |
| 7 | Matteau/Bernier/Velisek | 0h 48' 59" |
| 8 | Dusautoir Bertrand/Segura Lanao/Tudel Cuberes | 0h 49' 30" |
| 9 | Fulywer/Zurm/Kirkland | 0h 53' 17" |
| 10 | Horibe/Itō/Mase | 1h 11' 36" |

==== Men ====
| ranking | team | total time |
|---|---|---|
| | Lenzi/Reichegger/Holzknecht/Brunod | 0h 42' 48" |
| | Troillet/Anthamatten/Ecoeur/Bruchez | 0h 43' 50" |
| | Gachet/Bon Mardion/Perrier/D. Blanc | 0h 44' 17" |
| 4 | Martín de Villa/Pérez Brunicardi/Pinsach Rubirola/Jornet Burgada | 0h 45' 27" |
| 5 | Fasser/Jakob Herrmann/Stock/Klocker | 0h 47' 56" |
| 6 | Kuhar/Mikloša/Triler/Šenk | 0h 48' 46" |
| 7 | Berger/Hovdenak/Tronvoll/Porsanger | 0h 49' 06" |
| 8 | Comas Guixé/Casals Rueda/Vilana Díaz/Albós Cavaliere | 0h 49' 15" |
| 9 | Schuster/Strobel/Lex/Echtler | 0h 51' 37" |
| 10 | Scheefer/Taam/Parsons/French | 0h 53' 18" |

=== Combination ranking ===
(vertical race, individual and team ranking)

List of the best 10 participants by gender:

==== Women ====
| ranking | participant |
|---|---|
| | Roberta Pedranzini |
| | Francesca Martinelli |
| | Nathalie Etzensperger |
| 4 | Laëtitia Roux |
| 5 | Sophie Dusautoir Bertrand |
| 6 | Gemma Arró Ribot |
| 7 | Lydia Prugger |
| 8 | Silvia Rocca |
| 9 | Monique Merrill |
| 10 | Michaela Eßl |

==== Men ====
| ranking | participant |
|---|---|
| | Didier Blanc |
| | Florent Perrier |
| | Kílian Jornet Burgada |
| 4 | Florent Troillet |
| 5 | Manfred Reichegger |
| 6 | Damiano Lenzi |
| 7 | Marc Pinsach Rubirola |
| 8 | Dennis Brunod |
| 9 | William Bon Mardion |
| 10 | Martin Anthamatten |
