= Maribel Martín (mountaineer) =

Spanish ski mountaineer (born 1971)

Personal information
- Full name: Maribel Martín de la Iglesia
- Born: 26 May 1971 (age 55)

Sport
- Sport: Skiing

Maribel Martín de la Iglesia (born 26 May 1971) is a Spanish ski mountaineer. Together with Gemma Arró Ribot and Izaskun Zubizarreta Guerendiain she placed sixth in the relay event of the 2007 European Championship of Ski Mountaineering.
