= Dammkarwurm =

Dammkarwurm (literally: Dammkar worm) is the name of an annually discharged German ski mountaineering competition, carried out by the German Alpine Club (Deutscher Alpenverein) or DAV, for the first time in the end of the 1990s. The ranking of the Dammkarwurm is part of the German Skimountaineering Cup.

The Dammkar by itself is a cirque in the Karwendel near Mittenwald. Before the DAV became a member of the International Council for Ski Mountaineering Competitions (ISMC), the so-called "DIAMIR race" was carried out as the unofficial German championship of ski mountaineering in the Dammkar. In 2008 the German championship of vertical race took place in this cirque, too.
