= Valentin Favre =

French ski mountaineer (born 1987)

Personal information
- Born: 14 September 1987 (age 38)

Sport
- Sport: Skiing
Medal record
Representing France
Ski mountaineering
Silver medal – second place	2012 European Championship	Relay

Valentin Favre (born 14 September 1987) from Châtel, Haute-Savoie, is a French ski mountaineer.

== Selected results ==
- 2011:
  - 5th, World Championship, team, together with Alexandre Pellicier
- 2012:
  - 2nd, European Championship relay, together with Alexis Sévennec-Verdier, Yannick Buffet and William Bon Mardion
  - 9th, European Championship, sprint
  - 1st, Patrouille de la Maya, together with Alexis Sévennec-Verdier and Kílian Jornet Burgada

=== Pierra Menta ===
- 2011: 6th, together with Yannick Ecoeur
- 2012: 4th, together with Alexis Sevennec-Verdier
