= Alexander Fasser =

Austrian ski mountaineer

Personal information
- Born: May 20, 1975 (age 51)
- Died: September 02, 2021

Sport
- Sport: Skiing
Medal record
Representing Austria

Alexander "Alex" Fasser (May 20, 1975 – September 2, 2021) was an Austrian ski mountaineer and mountain biker.

Fasser started ski mountaineering in 1995 and competed first in the 2001 Biberwierer Tourenlauf. He has been member of the ASKIMO national team since 2008 and lived in Lermoos.

== Selected results ==
=== Ski mountaineering ===
- 2005:
  - 1st: Sellrain Valley marathon
- 2006:
  - 1st, Tyrolian Championship
- 2007:
  - 1st, Hochgrat ski rallye
  - 2nd, Jennerstier
  - 3rd, Tre Cime Alpin Maratona
  - 5th, Austrian Championship
- 2009:
  - 4th, European Championship relay race (together with Johann Wieland, Martin Bader and Wolfgang Klocker)
- 2010:
  - 5th, World Championship relay race (together with Jakob Herrmann, Markus Stock and Wolfgang Klocker)
- 2011:
  - 5th, World Championship relay, together with Markus Stock, Daniel Rohringer and Jakob Herrmann
  - 7th, World Championship team race (together with Jakob Herrmann)
- 2012:
  - 7th, European Championship vertical race
  - 7th, European Championship relay, together with Martin Weißkopf, Martin Islitzer and Markus Stock
  - 2nd, Hochgrat ski rallye

==== Patrouille des Glaciers ====
- 2010: 8th ("ISMF men" class ranking), together with Wolfgang Klocker and Markus Stock

=== Mountain biking ===
- 2006:
  - 1st, Tyrolian Championship
