= La Rivière-Enverse =

La Rivière-Enverse La Rvîre (Savoyard)
- Commune
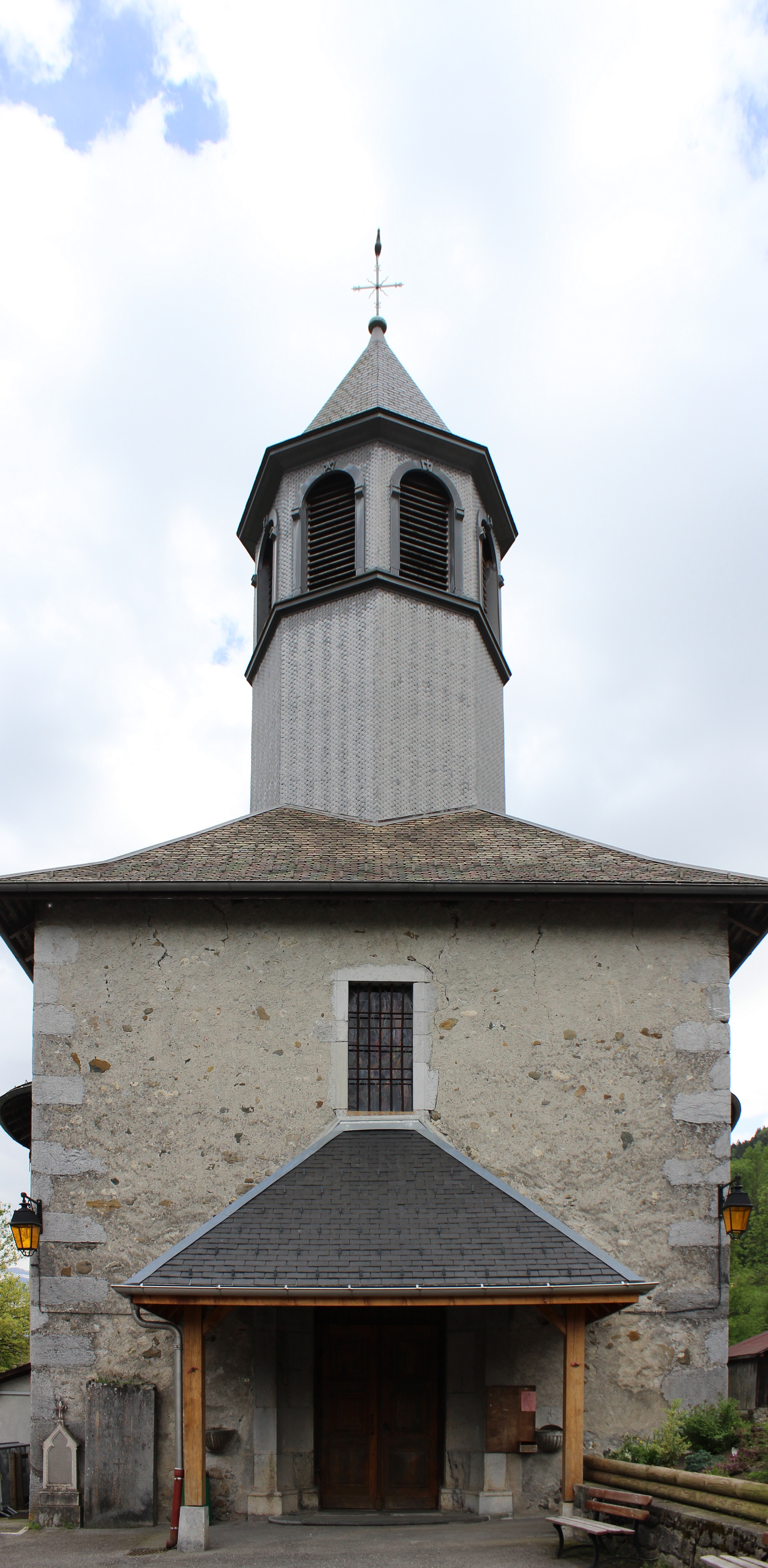
- Church

- Coat of arms
- Location of La Rivière-Enverse
- Location within France Location within Auvergne-Rhône-Alpes
- Coordinates: 46°05′37″N 6°38′14″E
- Country: France
- Region: Auvergne-Rhône-Alpes
- Department: Haute-Savoie
- Arrondissement: Bonneville
- Canton: Cluses

Government
  - Mayor (2020–2026): Sylvie Andres
- Area^{1}: 7.98 km^{2} (3.08 sq mi)
- Highest elevation: 1,320 m (4,330 ft)
- Lowest elevation: 619 m (2,031 ft)
- Population (2023): 504
  - Density: 63.2/km^{2} (164/sq mi)
- Time zone: UTC+01:00 (CET)
  - Summer (DST): UTC+02:00 (CEST)
- INSEE/Postal code: 74223 /74440
- ^{1} French Land Register data, which excludes lakes, ponds, glaciers > 1 km^{2} (0.386 sq mi or 247 acres) and river estuaries.

La Rivière-Enverse (Savoyard: La Rvîre) is a commune in the Haute-Savoie department in the Auvergne-Rhône-Alpes region in south-eastern France.

== See also ==
- Communes of the Haute-Savoie department
