= William Bon Mardion =

French ski mountaineer

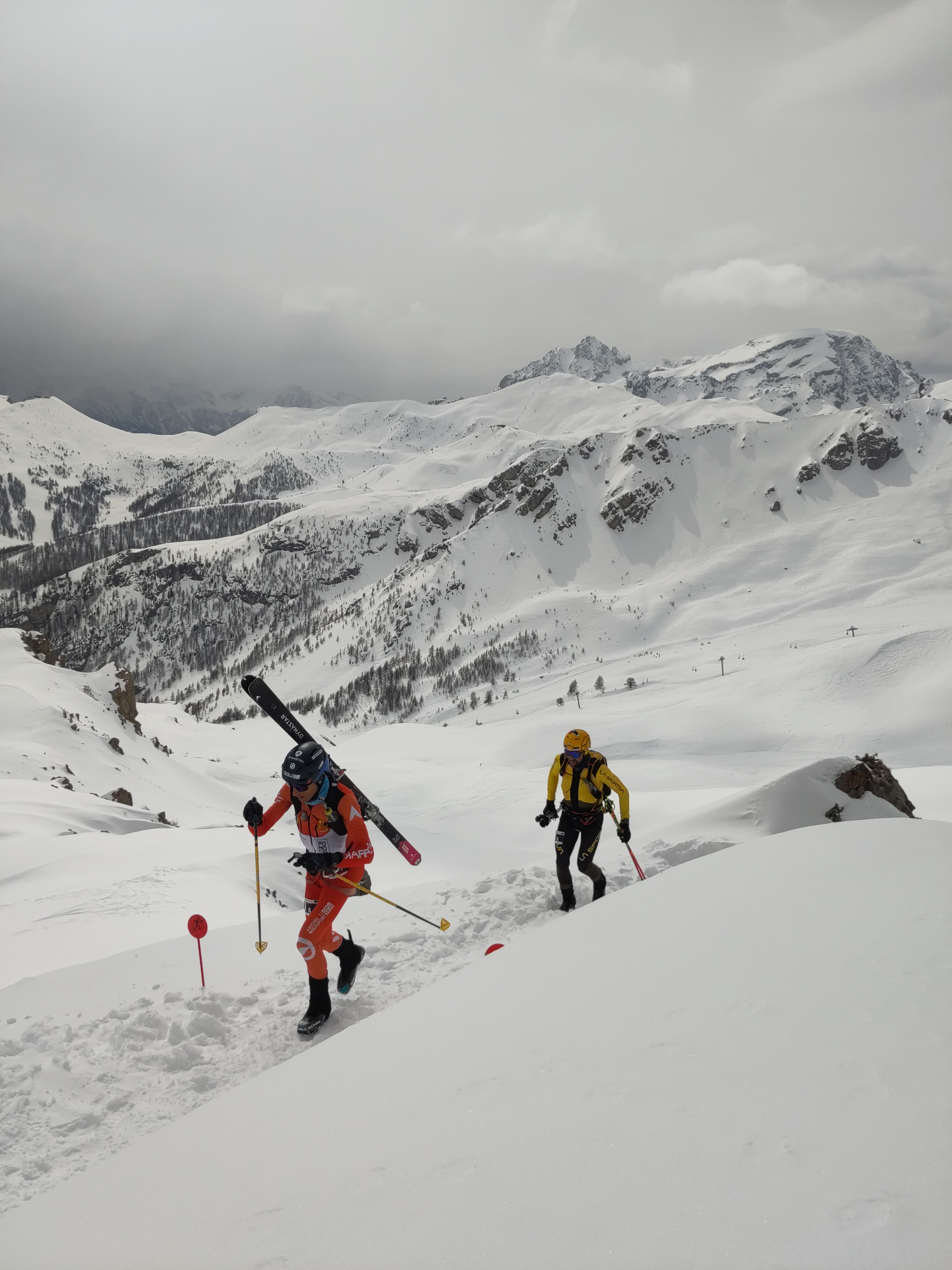

Personal information
- Born: 4 October 1983 (age 43) Arêches, France

Sport
- Sport: Skiing
- Club: Club Multisports Arêches-Beaufort
Medal record
Ski mountaineering
Representing France
World Championships
Silver medal – second place	2011 Claut	Individual
Bronze medal – third place	2010 Gran Valira	Relay
Bronze medal – third place	2011 Claut	Team
Bronze medal – third place	2011 Claut	Vertical race
Bronze medal – third place	2011 Claut	Relay
European Championships
Gold medal – first place	2012 Pelvoux	Individual
Silver medal – second place	2007 Avoriaz	Team
Silver medal – second place	2012 Pelvoux	Relay
Bronze medal – third place	2007 Avoriaz	Individual

William Bon Mardion (born 4 October 1983) is a French ski mountaineer.

== Career ==
Bon Mardion was born and lives in Arêches where he is member of the Club Multisports Arêches-Beaufort. He started ski mountaineering in 1998. He competed first as a member of the "Espoirs" team at the Pierra Menta race in the same year and has been member of the national team since 2006.

== Selected results ==
- 2005:
  - 10th, European Championship single race
- 2007:
  - 2nd, European Championship team race (together with Alexandre Pellicier)
  - 2nd, European Championship combination ranking
  - 3rd, European Championship single race
- 2008:
  - 4th, World Championship team race (together with Grégory Gachet)
- 2010:
  - 3rd, World Championship relay race (together with Didier Blanc, Florent Perrier and Grégory Gachet)
  - 4th, World Championship team race (together with Alexandre Pellicier)
  - 8th, World Championship single race
  - 9th, World Championship combination ranking
- 2011:
  - 2nd, World Championship single race
  - 2nd, World Championship vertical, combined ranking
  - 3rd, World Championship vertical race
  - 3rd, World Championship team race (together with Didier Blanc)
  - 3rd, World Championship relay, together with Didier Blanc, Xavier Gachet and Yannick Buffet
- 2012:
  - 1st, European Championship single
  - 2nd, European Championship relay, together with Alexis Sévennec-Verdier, Valentin Favre and Yannick Buffet
  - 5th, World Championship vertical, combined ranking
  - 6th, European Championship vertical race
  - 7th, European Championship sprint

=== Pierra Menta ===
- 2007: 4th, together with Vincent Meilleur
- 2008: 4th, together with Grégory Gachet
- 2009: 7th, together with Nicolas Bonnet
- 2010: 2nd, together with Florent Perrier
- 2011: 4th, together with Martin Anthamatten
- 2012: 3rd, together with Pietro Lanfranchi
- 2013: 1st, together with Mathéo Jacquemoud

=== Trofeo Mezzalama ===
- 2011: 1st, together with Kílian Jornet Burgada and Didier Blanc
