= Mountain Attack =

Austrian ski mountaineering competition

The "Mountain Attack" is an annual Austrian ski mountaineering competition, carried out near Saalbach since 1999.

The competition is separated in a short distance and a long distance course, each offered for a female and a male racer class. There is a separate ranking of racers, older than 45 years. The marathon track passes six summits, and includes an altitude difference of 3,000 meters for the total ascent and for skiing down.

== Best marathon racers ==
(since 2004: "Mountain Man")

year	participant	country	total time (h:min:sec)
1999	Omar Oprandi	Italy	3:05:39
2000	Fabio Meraldi	Italy	2:59:51
2001	Luciano Fontana	Italy	2:57:35
2002	Mirco Mezzanotte	Italy	2:52:01.0
2003	Martin Hornegger	Austria	2:45:05.0
2004	Andreas Ringhofer	Austria	2:40:28
2005	Andreas Ringhofer	Austria	2:39:42
2006	Guido Giacomelli	Italy	2:27:36.7
2007	Guido Giacomelli	Italy	2:32:00.0
2008	Andreas Ringhofer	Austria	2:30:51.7
2009	Guido Giacomelli	Italy	2:32:06.9
2010	Konrad Lex	Germany	2:36:27.0
2011	Kílian Jornet Burgada	Spain	2:33:32.0
2012	Kílian Jornet Burgada	Spain	2:17:14.22

Best female racer was Simone Hornegger from 2002 to 2006 (in a row), and from 2007 to 2009 Francesca Martinelli won the race in series. In 2010, Michaela Eßl placed first, in 2011 Mireia Miró Varela, and in 2012 Michaela Eßl once again.
