= Vertical race =

Kind of ski mountaineering

A vertical race is a special kind of ski mountaineering without the typical downhill skiing after ascending. At the mountain running and climbing passages the runners have to carry their skis in their backpacks. Vertical races for women and men are part of all international ski mountaineering competitions of the International Council for Ski Mountaineering Competitions as well as at many national competitions. The Union Internationale des Associations d'Alpinisme (UIAA)is working toward the goal of having vertical race become an Olympic discipline at the 2018 Winter Olympics, .

== Championships ==
At World Championships of Skimountaineering a vertical race was firstly rated in 2004 an at the European Championships in 2005.

=== World championships ===
| year | men | | | women | | |
| year | 1st rank | 2nd rank | 3rd rank | 1st rank | 2nd rank | 3rd rank |
| 2011 | Kílian Jornet Burgada | Yannick Buffet | William Bon Mardion | Mireia Miró Varela | Laëtitia Roux | Gemma Arró Ribot |
| 2010 | Kílian Jornet Burgada | Dennis Brunod | Florent Perrier | Roberta Pedranzini | Laëtitia Roux | Francesca Martinelli |
| 2008 | Florent Perrier | Dennis Brunod | Grégory Gachet | Roberta Pedranzini | Francesca Martinelli | Nathalie Etzensperger |
| 2006 | Patrick Blanc | Tony Sbalbi | Florent Perrier | Natascia Leonardi Cortesi | Roberta Pedranzini | Catherine Mabillard |
| 2004 | Patrick Blanc | Florent Perrier | Sébastien Epiney | Cristina Favre-Moretti | Isabella Crettenand-Moretti | Gloriana Pellissier |

=== European championships ===
| year | men | | | women | | |
| year | 1st rank | 2nd rank | 3rd rank | 1st rank | 2nd rank | 3rd rank |
| 2012 | Kílian Jornet Burgada | Yannick Buffet | Martin Anthamatten | Laëtitia Roux | Mireia Miró Varela | Gemma Arró Ribot |
| 2009 | Kílian Jornet Burgada | Tony Sbalbi | Yannick Buffet | Roberta Pedranzini | Mireia Miró Varela | Francesca Martinelli |
| 2007 | Florent Perrier | Agustí Roc Amador | Manuel Pérez Brunicardi | Laëtitia Roux | Roberta Pedranzini | Gloriana Pellissier |
| 2005 | Agustí Roc Amador | Florent Perrier | Mirco Mezzanotte | Cristina Favre-Moretti | Gloriana Pellissier | Barbara Gruber |
