= List of fastest known times for Pyrenees routes and summits =

Mountaineering speed records

This is a list of fastest known times for Pyrenees routes and summits.

== Background ==
The Fastest Known Time (FKT) stands for the speed record on any given summit or traverse, usually in the mountains. The term FKT has gained popularity in the last years, specially in alpinism and mountain running, ranging from summiting a single peak to long-distance trails.

FKTs are usually difficult to compare and verify. While conditions in the mountains are very different on each season, and year after year (due to global warming), it is only considered the fastest time, no matter the weather. Additionally, style/support (if received) is detailed due to its relevance.

Besides those limitations, the evolution of FKTs is interesting, like any speed record in athletics, to be aware of the human progress.

Credit to any activity should only be given if some sort of data is provided (GPS track, pictures, videos, etc.).

== List ==
Fastest known times for some of the most popular routes and summits of the Pyrenees
| Event | Region | Start | Distance | Elevation gain | Time | Athlete | Data | Style | Ref. |
|---|---|---|---|---|---|---|---|---|---|
| Monte Perdido Xtreme | Aragón | Pineta | 46 km | 4000 m | 5h 51' 40" | Aritz Egea | 2020-08-13 | Supported | |
| Monte Perdido (up & down) | Aragón | Torla | 43 km | 2400 m | 4h 24' 31" | Aritz Egea | 2016-08-19 | | |
| Pedraforca (up & down) | Catalunya | Estasen | 6.5 km | 884 m | 53' 12" | Manuel Merillas | 2020-06-25 | | |
| Carros de foc | Catalunya | Restanca | 67 km | 4600 m | 9h 22' 36" | Andreu Simón | 2020-07-31 | | |
| Aneto (up & down) | Aragón | Benasque | 37.6 km | 2250 m | 3h 43' 09" | Borja Fernández | 2020-08-23 | | |
| Alta Ruta de los Perdidos | Aragón | Bujaruelo | 92.84 km | 6035 m | 13h 42' 16" | Iker Carrera | 2017-06-17 | Supported | |
| Garmo Negro (summit) | Aragón | Balenario de Panticosa | 4,3 km | 1403 m | 59' 09" | Dani Osanz | 2020-09-06 | | |
| Bisaurin (summit) | Aragón | Puente de Santa Ana | 10.3 km | 1700 m | 1h 31' 40" | Asier Larrueza | 2020-08-08 | | |
| Cavalls del vent | Catalunya | Bagà | 84 km | 5600 m | 8h 42'23" | Kilian Jornet | 2012-09-29 | Supported | |
| La porta del cel | Catalunya | Tavascan | 65 km | 5500 m | 11h 38'42" | Ricardo Cherta | 2020-08-14 | | |
| Posets (summit) | Aragón | Eriste | 23.07 km | 2312 m | 3h 00' 48" | Aritz Egea | 2018-07-16 | | |
| Zegama Aizkorri Mendi Maratoia | Euskadi | Zegama | 42.2 km | 2736 m | 3h 45' 08" | Stian Angermund | 2017-05-28 | Supported | |
| Olla de Núria | Catalunya | Núria | 21 km | 1940 m | 2h 14' 56" | Kilian Jornet | 2009-07 | Supported | |
| Ruta de les 3 refugios | Aragón | Refugio de Estós | 50.37 km | 3470 m | 6h 52' 20" | Aritz Egea | 2020-06-24 | | |
| Travessa Cadí Moixeró | Catalunya | Fórnols | 43.43 km | 3098 m | 6h 10' 05" | Pau Bartoló | 2020-06-24 | | |
| Transpirenaica GR11 | Euskadi | Hondarribia | 696 km | 35717 m | 8d 6h 10' 05" | Kilian Jornet | 2010-06 | Supported | |
| Championnat du Canigó | Midi-Pyrénées | Vernet les bains | 34 km | 2180 m | 2h 58' 30" | Jessed Hernandez | 2009 | | |
| 2900 Alpine Run | Andorra | Refugi dels Llacs de la Pera | 70.7 km | 6700 m | 12h 13' " | Dakota Jones - Nick Elson | 2018-10-06 | Supported | |
| Aneto-Posets-Perdido | Aragon | Besurta | 125 km | 7000 m | 16h 53' 25" | Iker Carrera | 2011-07-23 | Supported | |
| Carlit (summit) | Angoustrine-Villeneuve-des-Escaldes | Lac des Bouillouses | 15 km | 950 m | 47' | Kilian Jornet | | | |
| Puigmal (summit) | Catalunya | Fontalba | 4.2 km | 794 m | 37'26" | Pere Rutllan | 2020-07-18 | | |
| Camí vell de Núria | Catalunya | Queralbs | 7 km | 850 m | 41'49" | Joan Freixa | 2012-10-19 | | |
| Puigmal (summit) | Catalunya | Núria | 3.9 km | 835 m | 36'54" | Jan Margarit | 2017-06-11 | | |
| La Tossa d'Alp (summit) | Catalunya | Alp | 6.65 km | 1341 m | 58'12" | Marc Sabater | 2019-08-18 | | |
| Collarada (summit) | Aragón | Villanúa | 9 km | 1922 m | 1h 43'44" | Aritz Egea | 2017-07-23 | | |
| Costabona (summit) | Catalunya | Collada Fonda | 2.3 km | 534 m | 28'58" | Joan Reyne | 2020-05-21 | | |
| Costabona (up & down) | Catalunya | Collada Fonda | 4.6 km | 534 m | 45'50" | Roger Angüés | 2020-05-27 | | |
| Tuc de Molières (X-Marathon) | Catalunya | Bielha | 42 km | 2440 m | 4h 10'33" | Quico Soler | 2001-07-08 | | |
| Pica d'Estats (summit) | Catalunya | Refugi Vallferrera | 9.39 km | 1200 m | 2h 20'07" | Óscar Sánchez | 2020-07-25 | | |
| Comapedrosa (up & down) | Andorra | Arcalís | 21 km | 2300 m | 2h33'17" | Kilian Jornet | 2018-07-28 | | |
