= Err-Puigmal =

Ski resort in the French Pyrenees

- Location within France Location within Occitanie Location within Pyrenees
- Location: Err, Pyrénées-Orientales, Occitania, France
- Nearest city: Andorra la Vella
- Coordinates: 42°24′40″N 2°03′30″E
- Opened: 1970
- Top elevation: 2,665 m (8,743 ft)
- Base elevation: 1,800 m (5,900 ft)
- Trails: 35
- Total length: 35 km (22 mi)
- Website: www.puigmal2900.com

Err-Puigmal or Puigmal is a winter sports resort in the Pyrenees massif located at the western end of the Pyrénées-Orientales department, in the Occitania region of France. The resort is about 2 km (1.2 mi) from the Spanish border. It takes its name from the summit that dominates it, the Puigmal which, at 2,910 m (9,550 ft) above sea level, is the second highest peak of the Cerdanya after Pic Carlit at 2,921 m (9,583 ft). The resort, located at an altitude of 1,835 m (6,020 ft), is one of the highest in the French Pyrenees. It is managed by the municipality of Err.

== History ==
Developed from 1970, the resort was created in the heart of the large Puigmal forest, below the mountain ridge that forms part of the Franco-Spanish border. A joint syndicate for the management of the resort, the Syndicat du Puigmal, was created, in which the commune of Err and the department participated. The commune of Sainte-Léocadie joined in 1984, but in a limited way. After the withdrawal of the department in 1992, the union changed its status and became an intercommunal union, to which the communes of Saillagouse, Nahuja, Palau-de-Cerdagne, Estavar and Sainte-Léocadie belonged, in addition to Err. Ski lifts were installed in the early 1990s.

After major investment efforts in 2004 and 2007, the resort suffered several catastrophic years due to the lack of snow. The operator, the intercommunal syndicate, ended up with debt in excess of €9 million. The resort closed in 2013. In December 2018, the municipality of Err launched a call for applications for reopening the resort under a private operator. Ideally, with a commitment to provide year-round activities at the resort.

After a period of closure, in the state of a ghost resort, and summer development, in particular based on the marketing concept of Station Trail of the Rossignol brand, a group of buyers from Toulouse and Bordeaux reached the conditions for reopening during the winter of 2021–22. The resort reopened on 21 December 2021. In order to minimise the impact to the environment, attendance was limited to 1,500 daily skiers throughout the week, with chairlifts only being operated between Thursdays and Sundays. At the end of 2023, the resort closed again after judicial liquidation ordered by the court of Perpignan. The closure was due to a lack of snow, during the winter 2022–23 season, and the rise in the cost of energy.

== Ski area ==
Stretching between 1,835 and 2,665 m (6,020 and 8,743 ft) with a north and east exposure, the ski area is the highest in the French Pyrenees. The resort covers an area of 320 ha (790 acres) and has 35 km (22 mi) of tracks, generally located in fir and pine forest. The resort is equipped with two chairlifts, seven ski lifts, two rope lifts and a snow rope, and pistes including five black, fourteen red, five blue and three green routes, two snow parks and four border cross. This limits the environmental footprint and the maintenance budget, without affecting the ability to service the ski area. Since 2003 in particular, the area has also offered a large area for secure freeride descent, from the top of the slopes at 2,665 m (8,743 ft).

== Planning ==
The resort has limited facilities in the form of a few ski centres, and does not offer accommodation. The resort is built around an entrance to the ski area at Cotzé at 1,835 m (6,020 ft) altitude, and a second located at Les Planes at 1,970 m (6,460 ft) altitude.
