= Federico Galera =

Federico Galera may refer to:

- Federico Galera (pentathlete) (born 1953), Spanish pentathlete
- Federico Galera (mountaineer) (born 1978), Spanish mountaineer and mountain runner
