= Kílian Jornet =

Spanish trail runner and ski mountaineer

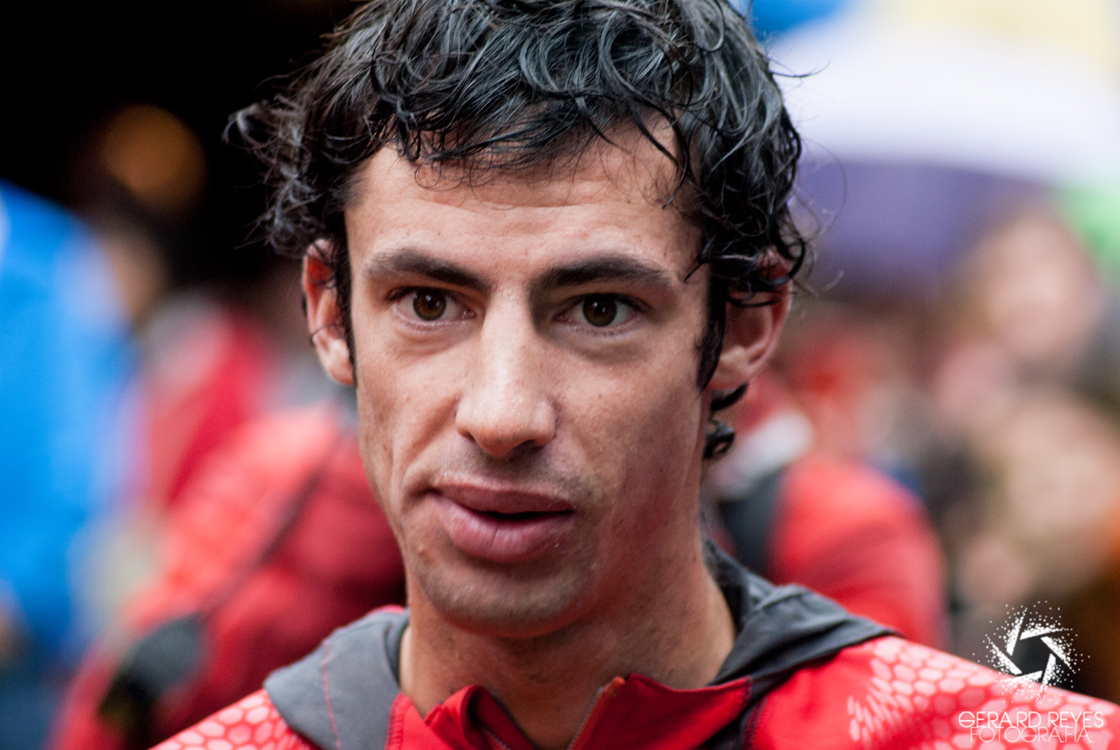

Personal information
- Nationality: (Spain) Spanish
- Born: Kílian Jornet Burgada; 27 October 1987 (age 39) Sabadell, Catalonia, Spain
- Height: 1.71 m (5 ft 7 in)
- Weight: 58 kg (128 lb; 9.1 st)
- Life partner: Emelie Forsberg
- Website: www.kilianjornet.cat
Medal record
Representing Spain
Ski mountaineering
World Championships
Gold medal – first place	2010	vertical race
Gold medal – first place	2011	individual
Gold medal – first place	2011	vertical race
Gold medal – first place	2015	vertical race
Silver medal – second place	2010	individual
Bronze medal – third place	2008	long distance
Bronze medal – third place	2008	relay
European Championships
Gold medal – first place	2009	vertical race
Gold medal – first place	2012	vertical race
Silver medal – second place	2009	relay
Silver medal – second place	2012	individual
Mountain running
Skyrunner World Series
Gold medal – first place	2007	Sky
Gold medal – first place	2008	Sky
Gold medal – first place	2009	Sky
Gold medal – first place	2012	Sky
Gold medal – first place	2012	Ultra
Gold medal – first place	2013	Sky
Gold medal – first place	2013	Ultra
Gold medal – first place	2014	Sky
Gold medal – first place	2014	Ultra
Gold medal – first place	2014	Vertical Kilometer
Silver medal – second place	2013	Vertical Kilometer
Skyrunning
World Championships
Gold medal – first place	2010 Premana	SkyMarathon
Gold medal – first place	2014 Chamonix	Vertical Kilometer
Gold medal – first place	2014 Chamonix	SkyMarathon
European Championships
Gold medal – first place	2008 Zegama	SkyRace
Gold medal – first place	2013 Canazei	SkyRace
Gold medal – first place	2013 Canazei	Vertical Kilometer
Gold medal – first place	2013 Vicenza	Ultra SkyMarathon

Kílian Jornet Burgada (Catalan pronunciation: [̍ˈkiljən ʒuɾˈnɛt buɾˈɣaðə]; born 27 October 1987) is a Spanish professional long-distance trail runner and ski mountaineer. Jornet has won some of the most prestigious ultramarathons, including the Ultra-Trail du Mont-Blanc multiple times, Grand Raid, Western States and Hardrock.

Jornet holds the fastest known time speed record for the ascent and descent of the Matterhorn (Lion ridge) and the speed record for Mont Blanc on foot. In addition, he holds the 24-hour uphill skiing record: 23,864-meters (78,274 ft).

== Early life and education ==
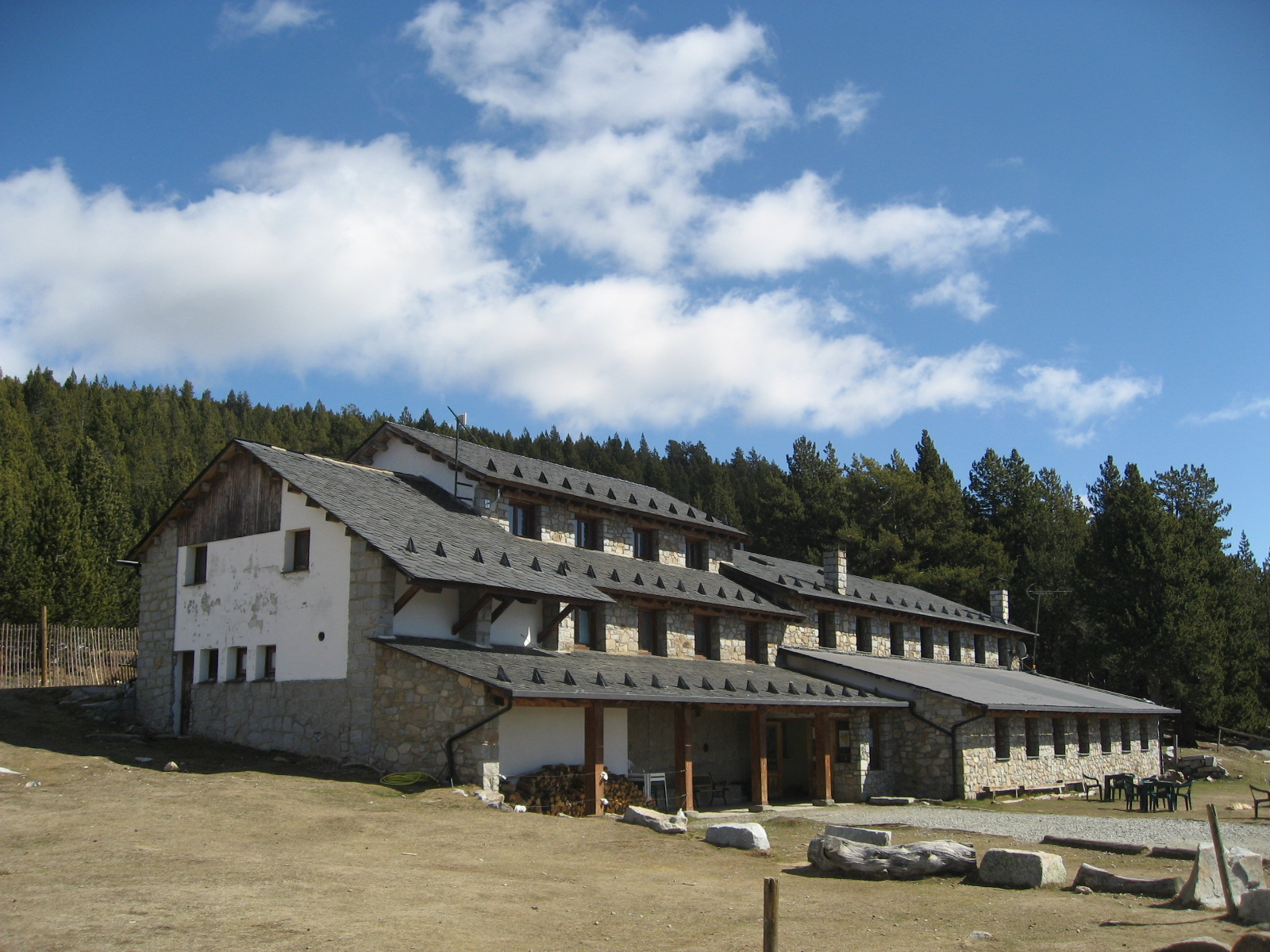
Cap de Rec mountain hut where Jornet grew up

Jornet was born in Sabadell, Catalonia, Spain near Barcelona. He grew up in Refugi de Cap de Rec, a mountain hut at 2000 meters in the Pyrenees at the cross-country Lles ski resort in Lles de Cerdanya, where his father was a hut keeper and mountain guide. At the age of three he climbed Tuc de Molières, a three-thousander in the Pyrenees. By the age of five he climbed Aneto 3,404 m (11,168 ft), the highest mountain in the Pyrenees, and a year later he climbed his first four-thousander, the Breithorn (4,164 m (13,661 ft)) on the Switzerland - Italy border.

Jornet studied at the University of Perpignan Via Domitia.

== Career ==
Jornet has been recognised as an elite athlete since 2004 by the Catalan and Spanish sports councils (Consell Català de l’Esport and Consejo Superior de Deportes). In 2005 he set a course record of 2:30:57 for the race to the 4,015-metre (13,173 ft) summit of the Dôme de Neige des Écrins. He was World Champion in the Buff SkyRunner World Series in 2007, 2008 and 2009 becoming the youngest athlete to win this honour.

== Personal life ==
His sister Naila Jornet Burgada and his partner Emelie Forsberg from Sweden also compete in ski mountaineering and skyrunning events.

On 7 September 2013 Jornet and Forsberg had to be rescued by the "Peloton de Gendarmerie de haute montagne" (PGHM, alpine rescue squad) at 3,800 meters of altitude (ésperon Frendo) while attempting to climb the north face of the Aiguille du Midi in the Mont Blanc massif, wearing trail running shoes with crampons and a body stocking.

Since February 2016 Jornet and Forsberg have been living in Måndalen in Rauma Municipality, Norway.

Jornet and Forsberg have three children, born in March 2019, April 2021, and early 2025.

== "Summits of My Life" Project ==
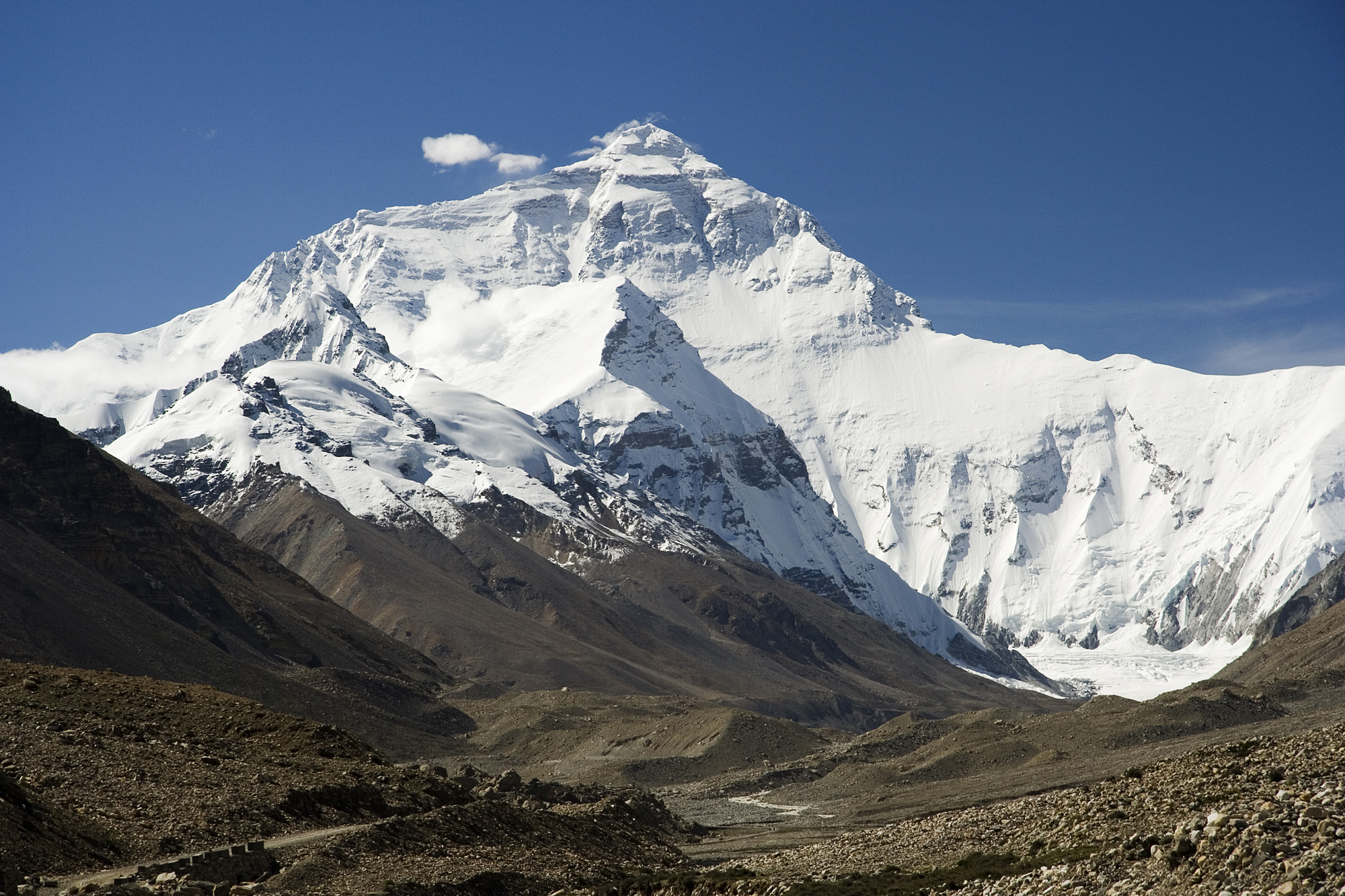
Jornet supposedly climbed Everest twice in 2017 without the use of supplemental oxygen, although his claims have been widely contested.

Summits of My Life was a project, trying to set ascent and descent records for some of the world's major mountains:

- Kilimanjaro 5,895 m (19,341 ft). On 29 September 2010, Jornet ascended and descended Kilimanjaro in a record time of 7 hours, 14 minutes. This record was broken on 13 August 2014, when the Ecuadorian mountain guide Karl Egloff ran up and down in 6 hours and 42 minutes.
- Mont Blanc traverse, 4,810 m (15,780 ft). In September 2012, Jornet completed the Innominata, a route linking Courmayeur and Chamonix, in 8 hours and 42 minutes. A previous attempt at ski crossing the Mont Blanc massif from Les Contamines to Champex in June 2012 resulted in the death of the French mountaineer Stéphane Brosse when a snow cornice collapsed under him.
- Mont Blanc. In July 2013, Jornet achieved the fastest known time for the ascent and descent from Chamonix in 4 hours and 57 minutes.
- Matterhorn, 4,478 m (14,692 ft). In August 2013, Jornet achieved the fastest known time for the ascent and descent from Breuil-Cervinia in 2 hours and 52 minutes. He improved the previous fastest known time set by Bruno Brunod in 1995 by more than 20 minutes. He started climbing up the 4,478 m (14,692 ft) peak during mid-afternoon local time, reaching the summit in 1 hour 56 minutes via the Lion Ridge from the Italian side.
- Denali, 6,168 m (20,236 ft). In June 2014 Jornet completed the fastest known time for the ascent and descent with a time of 11 hours and 48 minutes using both skis and crampons, breaking the previous record by 5 hours and 6 minutes. Karl Eggloff broke this record by running up and down Denali in 11 hours 44 minutes, on 20 June 2019. Eggloff did not use skis during the descent.
- Aconcagua, 6,960 m (22,830 ft). In December 2014 Jornet set a record for climbing and descending Aconcagua from Horcones (the nearest road, at Puente del Inca) and back, in 12 hours and 49 minutes. Jornet's record was broken in February 2015, again by Karl Egloff, who completed the route in 11 hours and 52 minutes.
- Elbrus, 5,642 m (18,510 ft). Jornet made an attempt in 2013 to set the fastest known time for the ascent and descent from Azau but was forced to turn back by bad weather. The fastest known time for the ascent is 3:23:37 set in 2010 by Andrzej Bargiel, while the record time for ascent and descent is 4:20:45, set on 7 May 2017 by Karl Egloff.
- Mount Everest, 8,848 m (29,029 ft). Jornet has claimed that he summited Mount Everest at midnight (local time) on 22 May 2017. Climbing without supplemental oxygen, he supposedly reached the top in 26 hours from base camp, again reaching the summit on May 29 from advanced base camp in 17 hours, about 15–20 minutes slower than the records from this camp set by Hans Kammerlander and Christian Stangl in 1996 and 2006, respectively. Jornet provided no evidence of this feat, and his claims have been widely disputed by other mountain runners.

== Selected results ==
=== Mountain running / skyrunning ===
- 2005:
  - 1st, and 2nd in the combined ranking at the "Cuita al Sol" race (in Spain)
  - 1st, and course record, Dôme de Neige des Écrins (in France)
  - 2nd, "Cross Vertical", in Andorra
  - 2nd, Prueba de Copa de España“ race, Buff-Salomon Vallnord
- 2006:
  - 1st International Championship team race, SkyGames (FSA)
  - 1st, French Championships of Mountainrunning, "junior" class race, FFA
  - 6th, Skyrunning World Championships
- 2007:
  - Champion of the year and four times 1st, Skyrunner World Series
  - 1st, Mount Ontake Skyrace (in Japan)
  - 2nd, Orobie Skyrace team race (in Italy) together with Jordi Martin Pascual and Xavier Zapater Bargue
- 2008:
  - Champion of the year and three times 1st, Skyrunner World Series
  - 1st, Ultra-Trail du Mont-Blanc [UTMB], France
- 2009:
  - Champion, Skyrunner World Series
  - 1st, 23rd Mt. Kinabalu Climbathon (in Borneo - Malaysia)
  - 1st, Ultra Trail Andorra
  - 1st, UTMB, France
  - 1st, Sierre-Zinal, Switzerland
- 2010:
  - 3rd, Western States 100, California, USA
  - 1st, Sierre-Zinal, Switzerland
  - 1st, Grand Raid de la Réunion
- 2011:
  - 1st, The North Face 100, Blue Mountains, Australia. Course Record
  - 1st, Western States 100, California, USA
  - 1st, UTMB, France
- 2012:
  - 1st, 26th Mt. Kinabalu Climbathon in Borneo, Malaysia (2:11:45)
  - 1st, Pikes Peak Marathon, Colorado, USA.
  - 1st, Grand Raid de la Réunion
- 2013:
  - 1st, Transvulcania, Spain
  - 1st, Zegama-Aizkorri, Spain
  - 1st, Marathon du Mont Blanc, France
  - 1st, Ice Trail Tarantaise, France
  - 1st, Dolomites Vertical Kilometer, Italy
  - 1st, Dolomites SkyRace, Italy
  - 1st, Trans D'Havet, Italy
  - 1st, Matterhorn Ultraks, Switzerland
  - 1st, Limone SkyRace Extreme, Italy
  - Then World Record, Mount Kilimanjaro Ascent and combined Ascent/Descent (5:23:50, 7:14:00)
- 2014:
  - 2nd, Transvulcania, Spain
  - 1st, Zegama-Aizkorri, Spain
  - 1st, Hardrock 100, Colorado, USA. Course Record clockwise
  - 1st, Marathon du Mont Blanc, Skyrunner World Championship, France
  - 1st, Vertical Kilometer race, Skyrunner World Championship, France
  - 1st, The Rut 50K, Skyrunner World Championship, Montana, USA
  - 1st, The Rut VK, Skyrunner World Championship, Montana, USA
  - 1st, Sierre-Zinal, Switzerland
  - 1st, Trofeo Kima, Italy
- 2015
  - 1st, Mount Marathon Race, Alaska, USA. Then Course Record
  - 1st, Hardrock 100, Colorado, USA. Course Record (ccw)
  - 1st, Ultra Pirineu, Bagà, Spain. Course Record
  - 1st, Sierre-Zinal, Switzerland
- 2016
  - 1st, Zegama-Aizkorri, Spain
  - 1st, Hardrock 100, Colorado, USA. Tie with Jason Schlarb (USA)
- 2017
  - 1st, Marathon du Mont Blanc, France
  - 1st, Hardrock 100, Colorado, USA
  - 1st, Sierre-Zinal, Switzerland
  - 2nd, UTMB, France
  - 1st, Salomon Glen Coe Skyline, Scotland (course record)
- 2018
  - 1st, Marathon du Mont Blanc, France
  - 1st, Trofeo Kima, Italy
  - Fastest Known Time, Bob Graham Round, Lake District, England
  - 1st, Sierre-Zinal, Switzerland
- 2019
  - 1st, Zegama-Aizkorri, Spain
  - 1st, Sierre-Zinal, Switzerland
  - 1st, Pikes Peak Marathon, Colorado, USA.
  - 1st, The Finale Annapurna Trail Marathon, Nepal
- 2021
  - Vertical Kilometer Fastest Known Time 28'48'04
- 2022
  - 1st, Zegama-Aizkorri, Spain (10th victory)
  - 1st, Hardrock 100, Colorado, USA, Course Record (cw) 21:36:24
  - 5th, Sierre-Zinal, Switzerland
  - 1st, UTMB, Course Record in 19:49:30
- 2024
  - 1st, Zegama-Aizkorri, Spain (11th victory)
  - 1st, Sierre-Zinal, Switzerland (10th victory). Course Record in 2:25:34
- 2025
  - 3rd, Western States 100, California, USA

=== Climbing ===
- 2006: 2nd, International Championship SkySpeed Climb

=== Duathlon ===
- 2006:
  - 1st Llívia duathlon race
  - 1st Núria duathlon race
- 2007:
  - 1st Núria-Queralbs Salomon Compex, "senior" class

=== Ski mountaineering ===
- 2002:
  - 2nd, Spanish Championship team race together with Gil Erra, "cadet" class
  - 4th, Spanish Cup, "cadet" class
  - 5th, Spanish Championship single race, "cadet" class
- 2003:
  - 1st, Spanish Championship team race together with Jaume Guàrdia
- 2004:
  - 1st, World Championship vertical race, "cadet" class
  - 1st, Spanish Championship single race, "cadet" class
  - 1st, Spanish Championship vertical race, "cadet" class
  - 1st, Spanish Championship vertical race together with Aleix Pubill Rodríguez, "cadet" class
  - 2nd, World Championship single race, "cadet" class
  - 3rd, European Cup single race, "cadet" class
- 2005:
  - 1st, European Championship vertical race, "cadet" class
  - 1st, Spanish Championship single race, "cadet" class
  - 1st, Spanish Cup (Spanish: Copa España) single race, "cadet" class
  - 1st, European Cup single race, "cadet" class
  - 1st, Spanish Championship team race together with Jordi Oliva
  - 3rd, Spanish Championship vertical race
  - 4th, Spanish Cup single race, "cadet" class
- 2007:
  - 1st, European Championship single race, "junior" class
  - 1st, European Championship vertical race, "junior" class
  - 1st, European Championship relay race together with Mireia Miró Varela and Marc Pinsach Rubirola, "junior" class
  - 1st, European Championship team race, "junior" class
  - 1st, 20th "Traça Catalana"
  - 2nd, Spanish Cup vertical race
- 2008:
  - 1st, World Cup race in Valerette
  - 1st, World Cup race in Massongex
  - 3rd, World Championship long-distance race
  - 3rd, World Championship relay race together with Javier Martín de Villa, Manuel Pérez Brunicardi and Marc Solá Pastoret
  - 4th, World Championship vertical race
  - 4th, World Cup single race in the Aran Valley
- 2009:
  - 1st, European Championship vertical race
  - 2nd, European Championship relay race together with Javier Martín de Villa, Joan Maria Vendrell Martínez and Manuel Pérez Brunicardi
  - 5th, European Championship team race together with Javier Martín de Villa
- 2010:
  - 1st, World Championship vertical race
  - 2nd, World Championship single race
  - 3rd, World Championship combination ranking
  - 4th, World Championship relay race (together with Javier Martín de Villa, Manuel Pérez Brunicardi and Marc Pinsach Rubirola)
  - 8th, World Championship team race (together with Marc Pinsach Rubirola)
  - 1st (espoirs), Trophée des Gastlosen (ISMF World Cup), together with Marc Pinsach Rubirola
- 2011:
  - 1st, World Championship single race
  - 1st, World Championship vertical race
  - 1st, World Championship vertical, combined ranking
  - 4th, World Championship relay, together with Marc Pinsach Rubirola, Miguel Caballero Ortega, Javier Martín de Villa
  - 8th, World Championship team race (together with Marc Pinsach Rubirola)
  - 1st, Mountain Attack
- 2012:
  - 1st, European Championship vertical race
  - 1st, World Championship vertical, combined ranking
  - 2nd, European Championship single
  - 4th, European Championship relay, together with Marc Pinsach Rubirola, Marc Solà Pastoret and Miguel Caballero Ortega
  - 5th, European Championship team, together with Marc Pinsach Rubirola
  - 1st and course record, Mountain Attack
  - 1st, Patrouille de la Maya, together with Valentin Favre and Alexis Sévennec-Verdier

==== Pierra Menta ====
- 2008: 1st together with Florent Troillet
- 2010: 1st together with Florent Troillet
- 2011: 1st together with Didier Blanc
- 2012: 7th together with Marc Pinsach Rubirola
- 2016: 1st together with Matheo Jacquemoud
- 2017: 2nd together with Alexis Sevennec
- 2022: 3rd together with Jakob Herrmann

==== Patrouille des Glaciers ====
- 2010: 4th together with Marc Solà Pastoret and Marc Pinsach Rubirola
- 2012: 1st together with William Bon Mardion and Mathéo Jacquemoud

==== Trofeo Mezzalama ====
- 2011: 1st together with William Bon Mardion and Didier Blanc
- 2013: 2nd together with William Bon Mardion and Mathéo Jacquemoud
- 2017: 2nd together with Martin Anthamatten and Werner Marti
- 2019: 3rd together with Jakob Herrmann and Armin Höfl

== Summit list ==
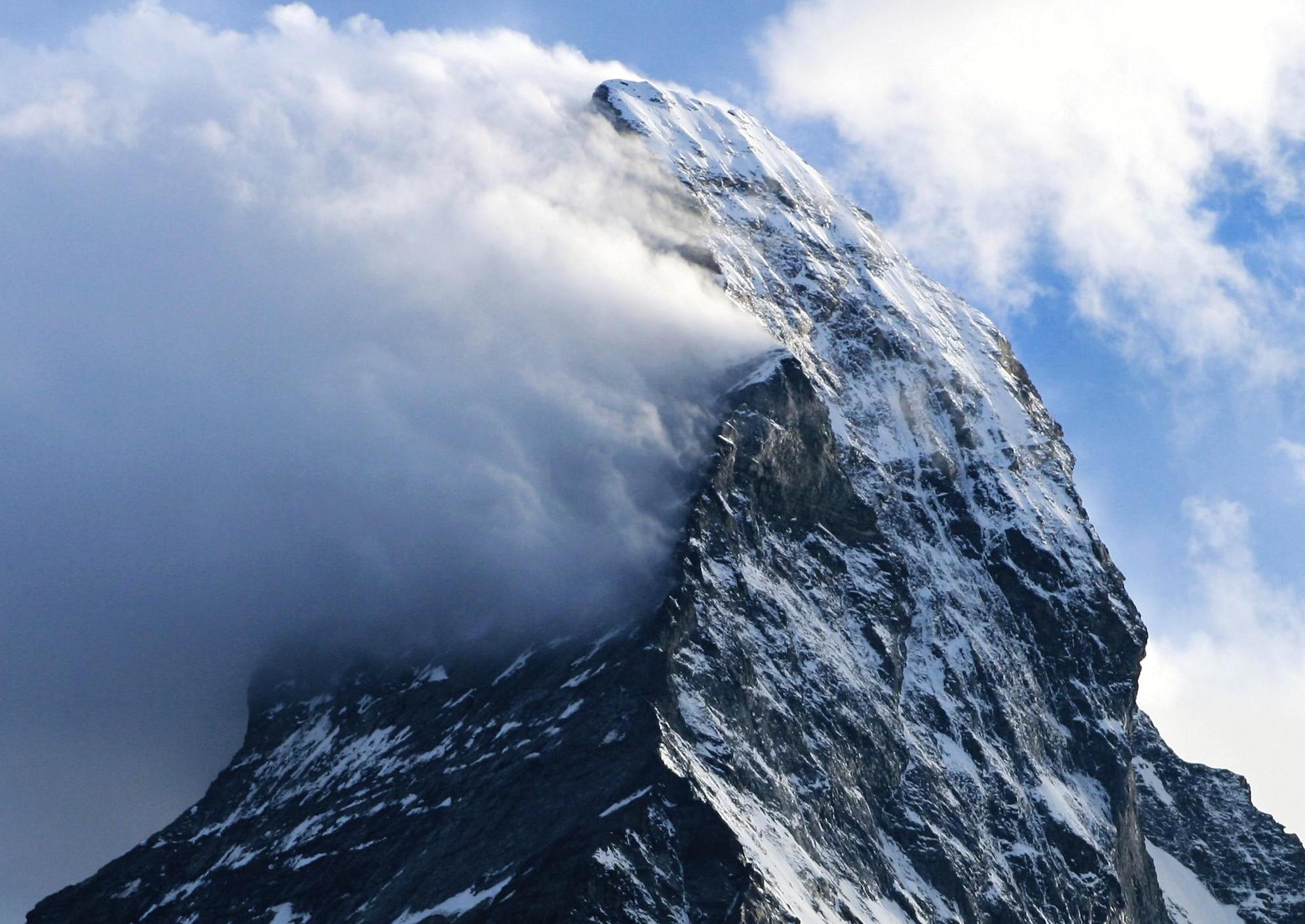
The Matterhorn

List of mountains summited:

- Mont Blanc, 2012
- Matterhorn, August 2013
- Denali, 2014
- Aconcagua, December 2014
- Cho Oyu, 2017
- Mount Everest (twice), 2017 Controversy:
- From August 13 to September 1, 2024, he climbed the 82 peaks of the Alps over 4,000 meters in 19 days with connections only by bike and running.
- From August 26 to September 25, 2025, he climbed 72 U.S. peaks over 14,000 feet (Fourteeners) in 31 days as part of his "States of Elevation" project. He covered over 3,000 miles and over 400,000 feet of elevation gain, linking every summit by running and cycling.

== Filmography ==
- Summits of my life – A Fine Line (2012) was presented in the Palau de la Música Catalana de Barcelona and shows Jornet accompanied by his mother, sister, his first trainer, and his friends, like Stéphane Brosse, Mireia Miró Varela, Vivian Bruchez, Matheo Jacquemoud, Jordi Tosas and Anna Frost.
- Summits of my life - Déjame Vivir (2014) was released online in 2014. It shows Jornets activities during 2013, the Mont Blanc running record in July, his speed record on the Matterhorn in August and his run on Mount Elbrus in mid-September.
- Summits of my life - Langtang (2015)
- Summits of my life - Path to Everest (2018)

== Bibliography ==
- Jornet, Kílian (2011). Run or Die. Velo Press. ISBN 978-1937715090.
- Jornet, Kílian (2013). The invisible border.
- Jornet, Kílian (2020). Above the Clouds: How I Carved My Own Path to the Top of the World. HarperCollins. ISBN 978-0008412128.

== See also ==
- NNormal
- Strava
- COROS
- Salomon
