= Étang du Lanoux =

Lake in Pyrénées-Orientales, France

Lake Lanoux Estany de Lanós
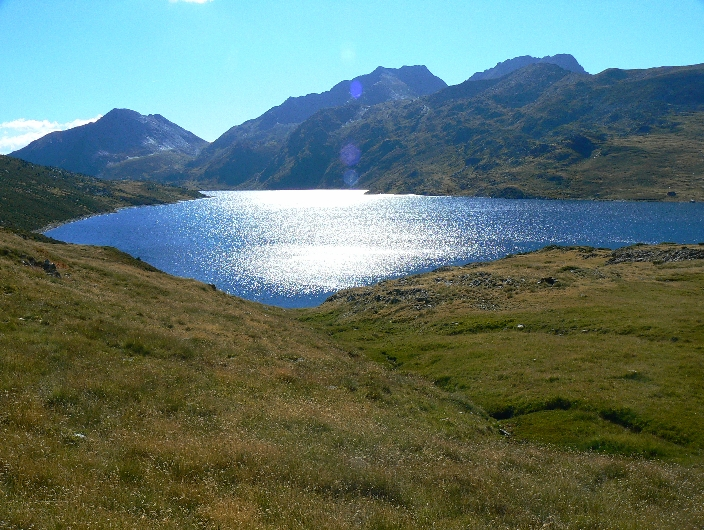

- Location within Pyrenees
- Location: Pyrénées-Orientales
- Coordinates: 42.589122°N 1.903896°E
- Primary inflows: Font Vive
- Basin countries: France
- Surface area: 1.71 km^{2} (0.66 sq mi)
- Max. depth: 75 m (246 ft)
- Water volume: 73 hm^{3} (59,000 acre⋅ft)
- Surface elevation: 2,213 m (7,260 ft)
- Settlements: Angoustrine-Villeneuve-des-Escaldes

The Lake Lanoux or Estany de Lanós is the biggest lake in the Pyrénées. It is located in the Pyrénées-Orientales, France.

== Geography ==
The Étang du Lanoux is located entirely on the commune of Angoustrine-Villeneuve-des-Escaldes.

== History ==
Henry Russell is known to have made the first ascent of the Pic Carlit in 1864, where he was fascinated by the beautiful view of the Étang du Lanoux, which can be seen from the top.

== Lake Lanoux Arbitration 1957 (France v Spain) ==
This arbitration concerned the use of the waters of Lake Lanoux, in the Pyrenees. The French Government proposed to carry out certain works for the utilization of the waters of the lake and the Spanish Government feared that these works would adversely affect Spanish rights and interests, contrary to the Treaty of Bayonne of May 26, 1866, between France and Spain and the Additional Act of the same date. In any event, it was claimed that, under the Treaty, such works could not be undertaken without the previous agreement of both parties.

Lake Lanoux lies on the southern slopes of the Pyrenees, on French territory. It is fed by streams which have their source in French territory and which run entirely through French territory only. Its waters emerge only by the Font-Vive stream, which forms one of the headwaters of the River Carol. That river, after flowing approximately 25 kilometers from Lake Lanoux through French territory, crosses the Spanish frontier at Puigcerda and continues to flow through Spain for about 6 kilometers before joining the river Segre, which ultimately flows into the Ebro. Before entering Spanish territory, the waters of the Carol feed the Canal of Puigcerda which is the private property of that town.

On September 21, 1950, Electricité de France applied to the French Ministry for Industry for a concession, based on a scheme involving the diversion of the waters of Lake Lanoux towards the River Ariège. The waters so diverted were to be completely returned into the River Carol by means of a tunnel leading from the upper courses of the Ariège at a point on the Carol above the outlet to the Puigcerda Canal. The French Government, however, while accepting the principle that waters drawn off should be returned, regarded itself as bound only to return a quantity of water corresponding to the actual needs of the Spanish users. Consequently, France was going to proceed to develop Lake Lanoux by diverting its waters towards the Ariege but a certain limited flow of water corresponding to the actual needs of the Spanish frontagers would be assured at the level of the outlet to the Puigcerda Canal. Spain was opposed to any diversion of the waters of Lake Lanoux.

The Tribunal examined the Treaty of Bayonne of May 26, 1866 and the Additional Act, as well as the arguments brought forward by both Governments. Regarding the question whether France had taken Spanish interests into sufficient consideration, the Tribunal stressed that in determining the manner in which a scheme had taken into consideration the interests involved, the way in which negotiations had developed, the total number of the interests which had been presented, the price which each Party had been ready to pay to have those interests safeguarded, were all essential factors in establishing, with regard to the obligations set out in Article 11 of the Additional Act, the merits of that scheme.

In conclusion, the Tribunal was of opinion that the French scheme complied with the obligations of Article 11 of the Additional Act. The Tribunal decided that in carrying out, without prior agreement between the two Governments, works for the utilization of the waters of Lake Lanoux in the conditions mentioned in the Scheme for the Utilization of the Waters of Lake Lanoux, the French Government was not committing a breach of the provisions of the Treaty of Bayonne of May 26, 1866, and the Additional Act of the same date."
