= Joan Maria Vendrell =

Spanish ski mountaineer (born 1976)

Personal information
- Full name: Joan Maria Vendrell Martínez
- Born: 4 August 1976 (age 49) Barcelona, Spain

Sport
- Sport: Skiing
Medal record
Ski mountaineering
Silver medal – second place	2009 European Championship	Relay

Joan Maria Vendrell Martínez (born 4 August 1976) is a Catalunyan ski mountaineer.

Vendrell was born in Barcelona. He started ski mountaineering in 1992 and competed first in the Ransol-Serrera race in 1993. He has been member of the national team since 2006 and lives in Broto.

== Selected results ==
- 1998:
  - 1st, Spanish Championship single race ("espoirs" class)
- 2005:
  - 3rd, Spanish Championship vertical race
  - 3rd, Spanish Championship team race
- 2008:
  - 9th ("civilian international men" ranking), Patrouille des Glaciers (together with Manuel Pérez Brunicardi and Danile León Roca)
- 2009:
  - 2nd, European Championship relay race (together with Kílian Jornet Burgada, Manuel Pérez Brunicardi and Javier Martín de Villa)
