= Err, Pyrénées-Orientales =

Err Er
- Commune
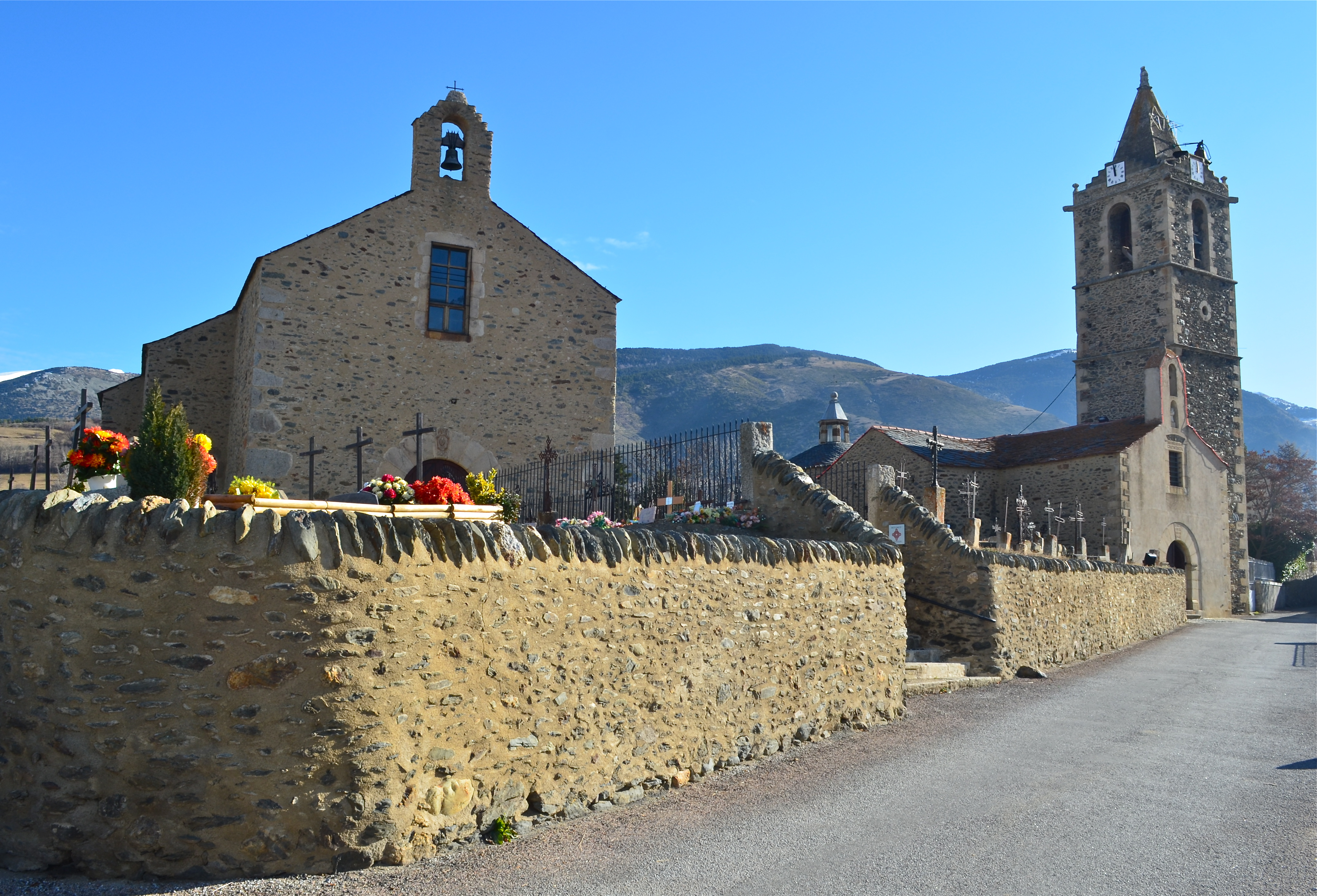
- The church of Saint-Génis and the chapel of the Virgin, in Err
- Location of Err
- Location within France Location within Occitanie
- Coordinates: 42°26′28″N 2°02′03″E
- Country: France
- Region: Occitania
- Department: Pyrénées-Orientales
- Arrondissement: Prades
- Canton: Les Pyrénées catalanes
- Intercommunality: Pyrénées Cerdagne

Government
  - Mayor (2020–2026): Isidore Peyrato
- Area^{1}: 25.92 km^{2} (10.01 sq mi)
- Elevation: 1,335 m (4,380 ft)
- Highest elevation: 2,911 m (9,551 ft)
- Lowest elevation: 1,309 m (4,295 ft)
- Population (2023): 716
  - Density: 27.6/km^{2} (71.5/sq mi)
- Time zone: UTC+01:00 (CET)
  - Summer (DST): UTC+02:00 (CEST)
- INSEE/Postal code: 66067 /66800
- ^{1} French Land Register data, which excludes lakes, ponds, glaciers > 1 km^{2} (0.386 sq mi or 247 acres) and river estuaries.

Err (French pronunciation: [ɛʁ]; Catalan: Er, locally [ˈer(t)]) is a commune in the Pyrénées-Orientales department in southern France.

== Toponymy ==
The onomastics of the town name, first attested as Ezerre in 839 AD amongst many later forms, is ultimately mysterious. Linguists generally agree it dates before the dominance of Celtic languages and Latin in ancient Gaul (a dominant hypothesis being a Basque-related Pre-Indo-European name; also see Old European hydronymy). Compare the etymology of similarly-sounding nearby Ur.

== Geography ==
Err is located in the canton of Les Pyrénées catalanes and in the arrondissement of Prades. Err station has rail connections to Villefranche-de-Conflent and Latour-de-Carol.

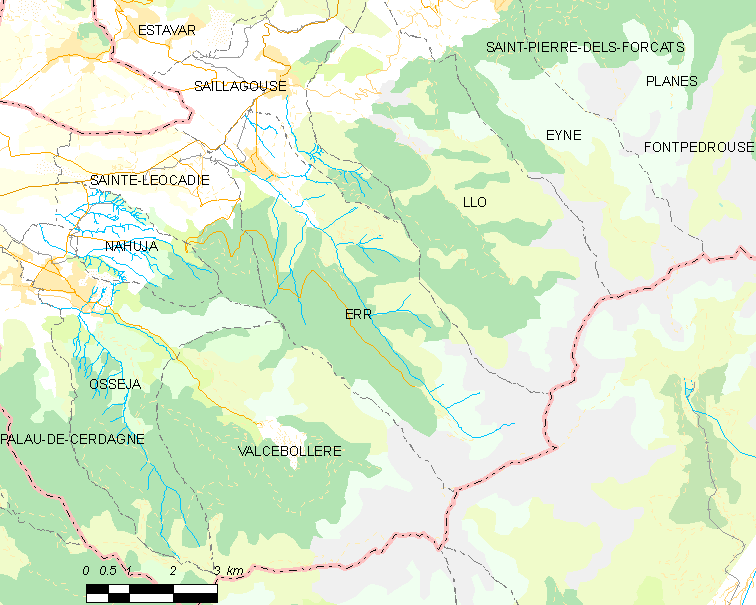
Map of Err and its surrounding communes

== Population ==
Historical population
Year	Pop.	±% p.a.
1968	352	—
1975	370	+0.71%
1982	408	+1.41%
1990	398	−0.31%
1999	551	+3.68%
2007	621	+1.51%
2012	620	−0.03%
2017	673	+1.65%
2023	716	+1.04%
Source: INSEE

== Sport ==
The commune contains the winter sports resort of Err-Puigmal, on the Puigmal mountain.

== See also ==
- Communes of the Pyrénées-Orientales department
