= Buzz Burrell =

American ultra runner

Personal information
- Nationality: American
- Born: October 31, 1951 (age 74) Michigan

Sport
- Country: United States
- Sport: Ultramarathon
- Coached by: Self

Buzz Burrell (born October 31, 1951) is an American ultrarunner, outdoor athlete, and businessman. Burrell began trail running and ultramarathons during the infancy of the sport in America during the late 1960s and early '70s at events such as the Pikes Peak Marathon.

Burrell first gained notoriety for his variety of outdoor accomplishments, especially ultra-endurance events and backcountry travel, which eventually led to his invention of Fastest Known Time concept and associated website with Peter Bakwin. He personally set a wide array of fastest times and first attempts at routes such as the Colorado Trail and John Muir Trail. In addition to trail running as a USATF Masters Trail Champion, he has set speed records in other outdoor sports such as climbing routes in the Flatirons.

Professionally, Burrell has managed the La Sportiva mountain running team, owned an organic farm, and was a brand director for outdoor clothing and equipment retailer Ultimate Direction. Burrell is the host of The Buzz podcast sponsored by UltraSignup.

Burrell was inducted into the inaugural TrailCon Hall of Fame in June, 2025.
