= Marc Solà =

Personal information
- Full name: Marc Solà Pastoret
- Born: 6 September 1985 (age 40) Camprodon, Spain

Sport
- Sport: Skiing
Medal record
Ski mountaineering
Representing Spain
World Championships
Bronze medal – third place	2008 World Championship	relay

Marc Solà Pastoret (born 6 September 1985) is a Catalan ski mountaineer.

Solá is born in Camprodon. He started ski mountaineering in 2002 and has been member of the Spanish national team since 2003. He lives in Vilallonga de Ter.

== Selected results ==
- 2005:
  - 3rd, at the last World Cup race, Slovakia
  - 4th, World Cup race, "junior" class, 2005
- 2007:
  - 4th, European Championship relay race together with Javier Martín de Villa, Agustí Roc Amador and Manuel Pérez Brunicardi
- 2008:
  - 3rd, World Championship relay race together with Javier Martín de Villa, Manuel Pérez Brunicardi and Kílian Jornet Burgada
  - 9th, World Championship single race
  - 9th, World Championship long-distance race
- 2011:
  - 9th, World Championship team race (together with Miguel Caballero Ortega)
- 2012:
  - 4th, European Championship relay, together with Marc Pinsach Rubirola, Miguel Caballero Ortega and Kílian Jornet Burgada
  - 8th, European Championship team, together with Miguel Caballero Ortega
  - 10th, European Championship vertical race

=== Pierra Menta ===
- 2007: 10th, together with Jordi Bes Ginesta

=== Patrouille des Glaciers ===
- 2010: 4th, together with Kílian Jornet Burgada and Marc Pinsach Rubirola
