= Javier Martín (mountaineer) =

Spanish ski mountaineer (born 1981)

Personal information
- Full name: Javier Martín de Villa
- Born: 23 August 1981 (age 44) Madrid, Spain

Sport
- Sport: Skiing
- Club: Dynafit team
Medal record
Ski mountaineering
Representing Spain
World Championships
Bronze medal – third place	2008 World Championship	Relay
European Championships
Silver medal – second place	2009 European Championship	Relay

Javier Martín de Villa (born 23 August 1981) is a Spanish ski mountaineer.

Martín was born in Madrid. He started ski mountaineering in 1998, competed first in the Trofeo Altos Pirineos race and became a member of the national team in the same year. He is also a member of the Dynafit team.

== Selected results ==
- 2001:
  - 7th, European Championship "juniors" class team race (together with Arnau Anguera)
- 2002:
  - 8th, World Championship "espoirs" class single race
  - 8th, Spanish Cup "espoirs" class single
- 2003:
  - 1st, Spanish Cup "espoirs" class single
  - 1st, Spanish Championship "espoirs" class single
  - 3rd, Spanish Cup "espoirs" class team (together with Germán Cerezo)
  - 3rd, European Cup "espoirs" class single
- 2004:
  - 1st, Spanish Cup "espoirs" class
  - 1st, Spanish Championship "espoirs" class team
  - 1st, Open Internacional, San Carlos de Bariloche
  - 2nd, World Championship "espoirs" class single race
  - 2nd, Spanish Championship "espoirs" class single
  - 4th, World Championship relay race ("seniors" ranking, together with Agustí Roc Amador, Dani León Roca and Manuel Pérez Brunicardi)
  - 5th, Spanish Cup
  - 10th, World Championship vertical race ("seniors" ranking)
- 2005:
  - 6th, European Championship relay race (together with Manuel Pérez Brunicardi, Germán Cerezo Alonso and Fernando Navarro Aznar)
  - 8th, Spanish Cup
  - 10th, World Cup team (together with Manuel Pérez Brunicardi)
- 2006:
  - 4th,Spanish Championship single
  - 6th, World Championship relay race (together with Federico Galera Díez, Manuel Pérez Brunicardi and Agustí Roc Amador)
- 2007:
  - 2nd, Andalusian Championship single
  - 4th, European Championship relay race (together with Agustí Roc Amador, Marc Solá Pastoret and Manuel Pérez Brunicardi)
  - 10th, European Championship vertical race
  - 10th, European Championship single race
- 2008:
  - 3rd, World Championship relay race (together with Kílian Jornet Burgada, Marc Solá Pastoret and Manuel Pérez Brunicardi)
  - 5th, World Championship team race (together with Jordi Bes Ginesta)
  - 7th, World Championship combination ranking
- 2009:
  - 2nd, European Championship relay race (together with Kílian Jornet Burgada, Manuel Pérez Brunicardi and Joan Maria Vendrell Martínez)
  - 4th, European Championship combination ranking
  - 5th, European Championship single race
  - 5th, European Championship team race (together with Kílian Jornet Burgada)
  - 7th, European Championship vertical race
- 2010:
  - 4th, World Championship relay race (together with Manuel Pérez Brunicardi, Marc Pinsach Rubirola and Kílian Jornet Burgada)
- 2011:
  - 4th, World Championship relay, together with Marc Pinsach Rubirola, Kílian Jornet Burgada and Miguel Caballero Ortega

=== Pierra Menta ===
- 2010: 8th, Pierra Menta together with Marc Pinsach Rubirola

=== Patrouille des Glaciers ===
- 2010: 2nd ("seniors II" ranking), together with Benedikt Böhm and Pete Swenson
