= Err station =

Railway station in Err, France

Err
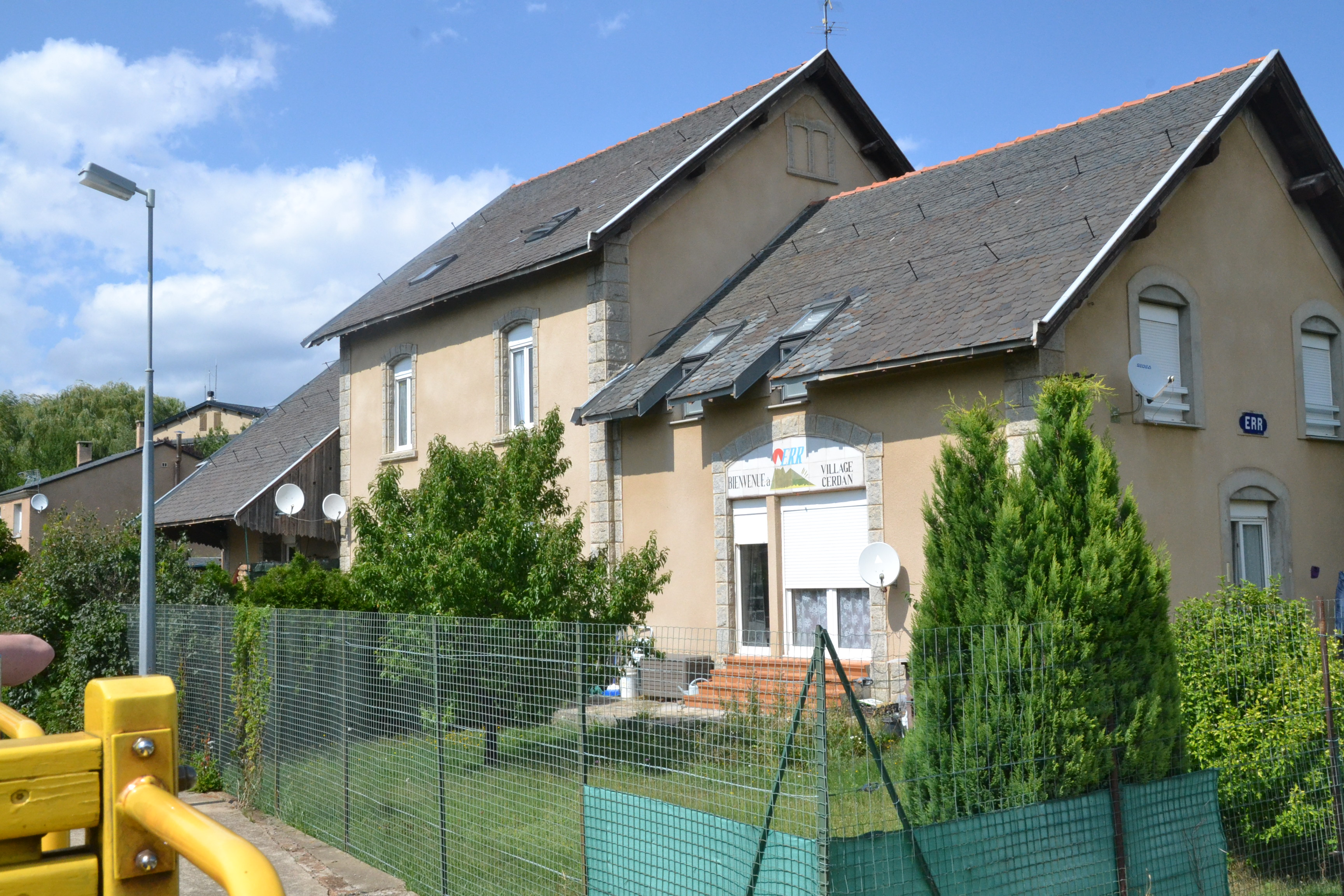
- Old passenger building

General information
- Location: Rue de la gare 66800 Err; Pyrénées-Orientales, France
- Coordinates: 42.44278°N 2.02901°E
- Elevation: 1,335 m (4,380 ft)
- Owner: SNCF
- Operator: SNCF
- Line: Cerdagne railway
- Distance: 46.613 km
- Platforms: 1
- Tracks: 1

Other information
- Station code: 87784843

Passengers
- 2018: 306

Services
Preceding station	TER Occitanie	Following station
Sainte-Léocadie towards Latour-de-Carol	32 (Ligne de Cerdagne)	Saillagouse towards Villefranche–Vernet-les-Bains
Location

Err station (French: Gare d'Err) is a railway station in Err, Pyrénées-Orientales, Occitanie, southern France. Within TER Occitanie, it is part of line 32 (Latour-de-Carol-Enveitg–Villefranche-Vernet-les-Bains, Train Jaune).

In 2018, the SNCF estimated that 306 passengers travelled through the station.

== See also ==
- List of SNCF stations in Occitanie
