= Sainte-Léocadie station =

Railway station in Sainte-Léocadie, France

Sainte-Léocadie
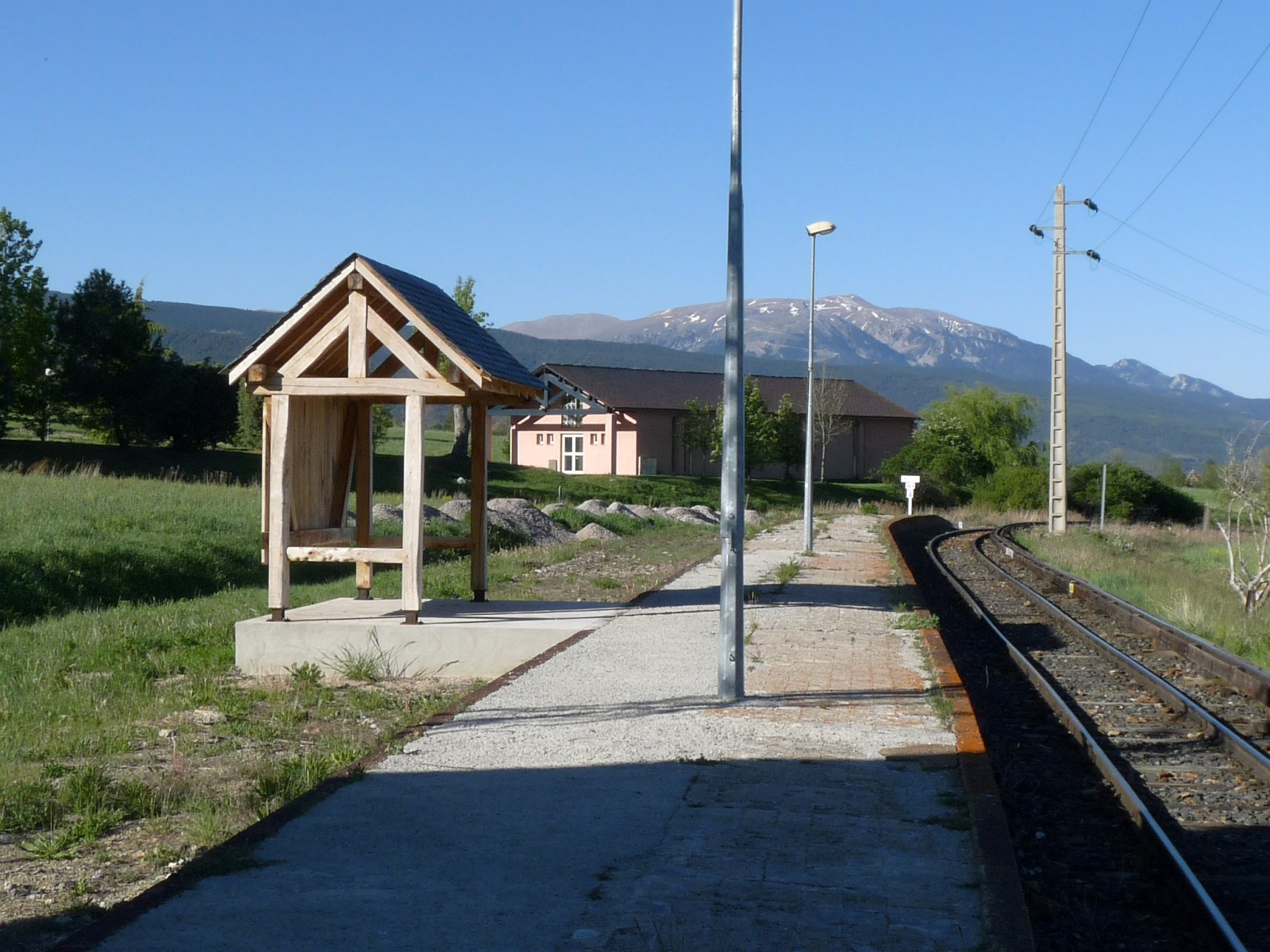

General information
- Location: Sainte-Léocadie, Occitanie, France
- Coordinates: 42.4412°N 2.0105°E
- Line: Ligne de Cerdagne

Other information
- Station code: 87784850

Services
Preceding station	TER Occitanie	Following station
Osséja towards Latour-de-Carol	32 (Ligne de Cerdagne)	Err towards Villefranche–Vernet-les-Bains
Location

Sainte-Léocadie is a railway station in Sainte-Léocadie, Occitanie, southern France. Within TER Occitanie, it is part of line 32 (Latour-de-Carol-Enveitg–Villefranche-Vernet-les-Bains, Train Jaune).
