= Miguel Caballero (mountaineer) =

Spanish ski mountaineer and ultramarathon runner

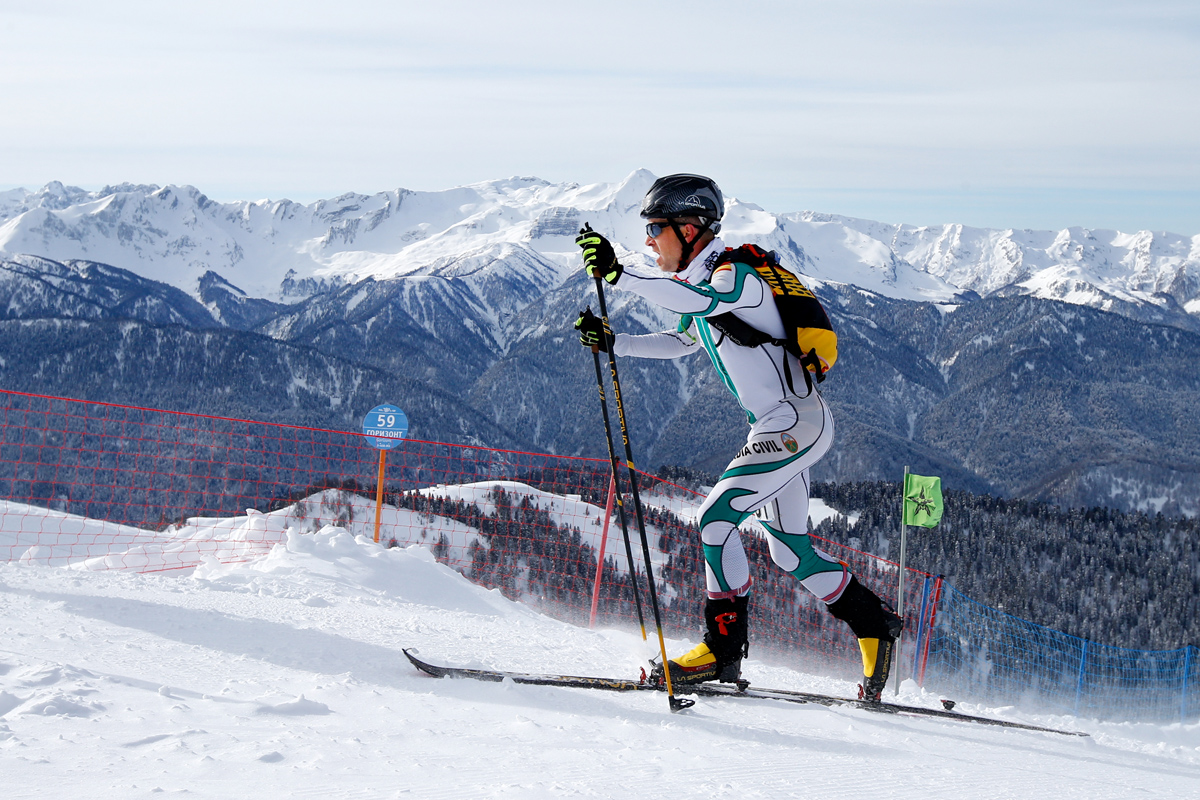

Personal information
- Full name: Miguel Caballero Ortega
- Born: 8 July 1982 (age 44) Madrid, Spain

Sport
- Sport: Skiing
- Club: Club de Montaña
Medal record
World Military Games
Gold medal – first place	2017 Sochi	Team race
Bronze medal – third place	2017 Sochi	Individual
Bronze medal – third place	2017 Sochi	Team

Miguel Caballero Ortega (born Madrid, 8 July 1982) is a Spanish ski mountaineer and ultramarathon runner. He is member of the mountain club (Spanish: Club de Montaña) of the Guardia Civil.

== Selected results ==
- 2011:
  - 4th, World Championship, relay, together with Marc Pinsach Rubirola, Kílian Jornet Burgada and Javier Martín de Villa
  - 9th, World Championship, team, together with Marc Solá Pastoret
- 2012:
  - 4th, European Championship, relay, together with Marc Pinsach Rubirola, Marc Solà Pastoret and Kílian Jornet Burgada
  - 8th, European Championship, team, together with Marc Solá Pastoret
