= Marc Pinsach =

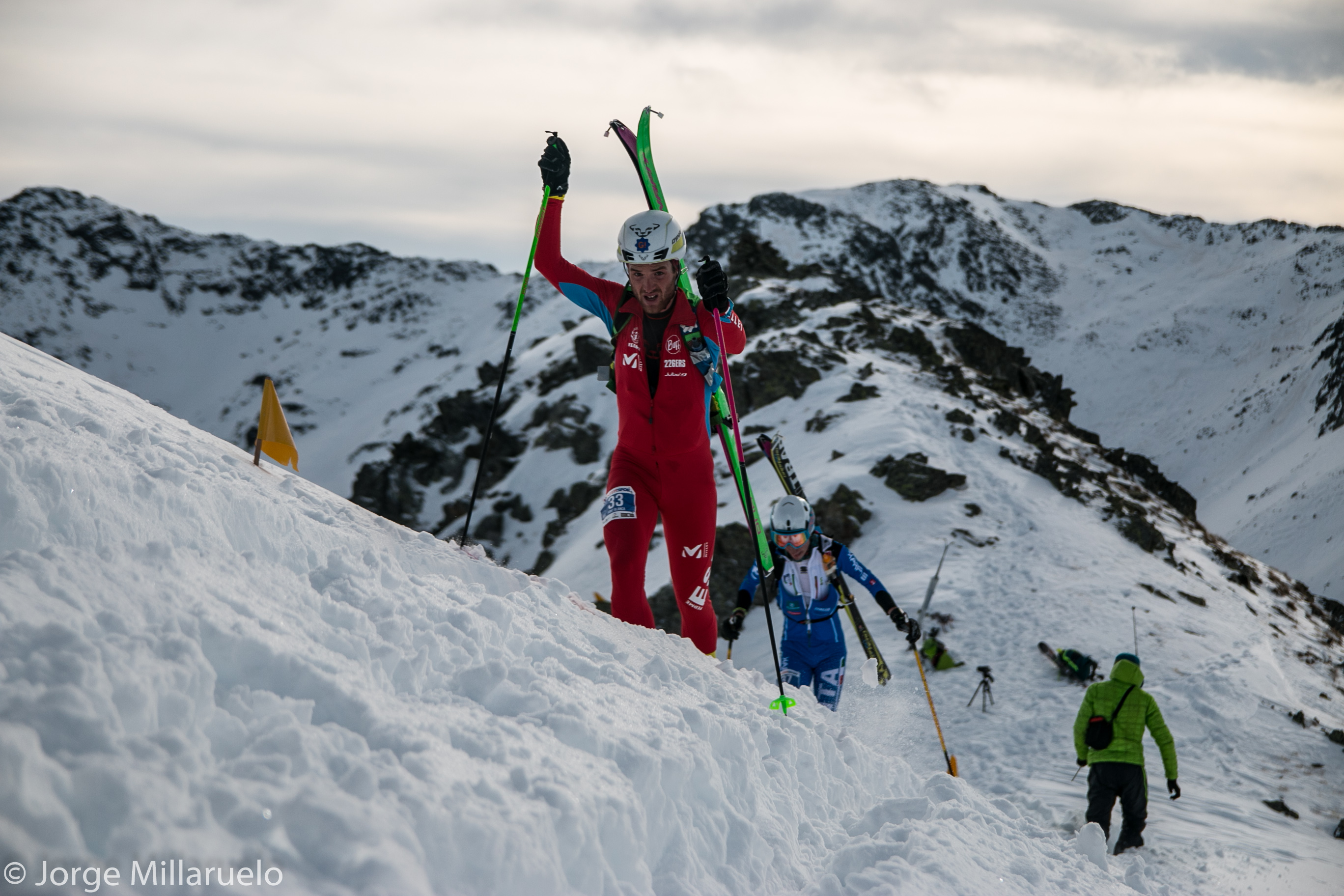

Personal information
- Full name: Marc Pinsach Rubirola
- Born: 15 April 1989 (age 37) Girona, Spain

Sport
- Sport: Skiing

Marc Pinsach Rubirola (born 15 April 1989) is a Catalan ski mountaineer.

Pinsach is born in Girona. He started ski mountaineering in 2000 and has been member of the Spanish national team since 2006. He lives in Cassà de la Selva.

== Selected results ==
- 2010:
  - 4th, World Championship relay race, together with Javier Martín de Villa, Kílian Jornet Burgada and Manuel Pérez Brunicardi
  - 7th, World Championship vertical race
  - 8th, World Championship team race, together with Kílian Jornet Burgada
  - 9th, World Championship single race
  - 7th, World Championship combination ranking
  - 1st (espoirs), Trophée des Gastlosen (ISMF World Cup), together with Kílian Jornet Burgada
- 2011:
  - 4th, World Championship relay, together with Kílian Jornet Burgada, Miguel Caballero Ortega and Javier Martín de Villa
  - 6th, World Championship vertical race
  - 8th, World Championship team race (together with Kílian Jornet Burgada)
  - 10th, World Championship single race
  - 10th, World Championship vertical, combined ranking
- 2012:
  - 4th, European Championship relay, together with Marc Solà Pastoret, Miguel Caballero Ortega and Kílian Jornet Burgada
  - 5th, European Championship team, together with Kílian Jornet Burgada
  - 8th, European Championship vertical race
  - 10th, World Championship vertical, combined ranking

=== Patrouille des Glaciers ===
- 2010: 4th, together with Kílian Jornet Burgada and Marc Solà Pastoret

=== Pierra Menta ===
- 2010: 8th, together with Javier Martín de Villa
- 2011: 8th, together with Pietro Lanfranchi
- 2012: 7th, together with Kílian Jornet Burgada

=== Trofeo Mezzalama ===
- 2011: 3rd, together with Michele Boscacci and Robert Antonioli
