= Manu Pérez =

Spanish ski mountaineer (born 1978)

Personal information
- Full name: Manuel Pérez Brunicardi
- Born: 22 August 1978 (age 47) Segovia, Spain

Sport
- Sport: Skiing
Medal record
Ski mountaineering
Representing Spain
World Championships
Bronze medal – third place	2008 World Championship	Relay
European Championships
Bronze medal – third place	2007 European Championship	Vertical race
Silver medal – second place	2009 European Championship	Relay

Manuel Pérez Brunicardi (born 22 August 1978) is a Spanish ski mountaineer.

Pérez was born in Segovia. He started ski mountaineering in 1995 and competed first in 1996. In 1999 he became a member of the national team. He won the Spanish Championships in a row from 2002 to 2006. In 2003 he ranked second in the international ISMC ranking and became "high level athlete" of the high sports council (Spanish: Consejo Superior de Deportes) of the Spanish government (No. 70.241.363 - Moñana y Escalada).

== Selected results ==
- 2002:
  - 1st, Spanish Championship
  - 1st, Spanish Cup
  - 1st, Spanish Championship team race (together with Jordi Bes Ginesta)
- 2003:
  - 1st, Spanish Championship single
  - 1st, Spanish Cup
  - 1st, Spanish Championship team race (together with Jordi Bes Ginesta)
  - 6th, European Championship relay race (together with Javier Martín de Villa, Germán Cerezo Alonso and Fernando Navarro Aznar)
  - 7th, European Championship team race (together with Jordi Bes Ginesta)
  - 7th, European Championship vertical race
  - 8th, European Championship single race
- 2004:
  - 1st, Spanish Championship single
  - 4th, World Championship relay race (together with Agustí Roc Amador, Javier Martín de Villa and Dani León Roca)
  - 7th, World Championship vertical race
- 2005:
  - 1st, Spanish Championship single
  - 1st, Spanish Cup
  - 2nd, Spanish Championship vertical race
  - 6th, World Cup race, Salt Lake City
  - 7th, European Championship vertical race
  - 9th, European Championship single race
  - 10th, World Cup team (together with Javier Martín de Villa)
- 2006:
  - 1st, Spanish Championship single
  - 1st, Spanish Championship team
  - 1st, Spanish Cup
  - 2nd, Spanish Championship vertical race
  - 6th, World Championship relay race (together with Javier Martín de Villa, Federico Galera Díez and Agustí Roc Amador)
- 2007:
  - 3rd, European Championship vertical race
  - 4th, European Championship relay race (together with Javier Martín de Villa, Agustí Roc Amador and Marc Solá Pastoret)
  - 10th, European Championship team race (together with Jordi Bes Ginesta)
  - 10th, European Championship combination ranking
- 2008:
  - 3rd, World Championship relay race (together with Javier Martín de Villa, Marc Solá Pastoret and Kílian Jornet Burgada)
- 2009:
  - 2nd, European Championship relay race (together with Javier Martín de Villa, Joan Maria Vendrell Martínez and Kílian Jornet Burgada)
  - 8th, European Championship combination ranking
  - 10th, European Championship team race (together with Jordi Bes Ginesta)
- 2010:
  - 4th, World Championship relay race (together with Javier Martín de Villa, Marc Pinsach Rubirola and Kílian Jornet Burgada)

=== Patrouille des Glaciers ===
- 2000: 6th ("seniors I" class ranking), together with Federico Galera Díez and Jorge Palacio Sanz
- 2008: 9th ("civilian international men" ranking), together with Joan Maria Vendrell Martínez and Danile León Roca
