= Karl Egloff =

Ecuadorian-Swiss mountaineer (born 1981)

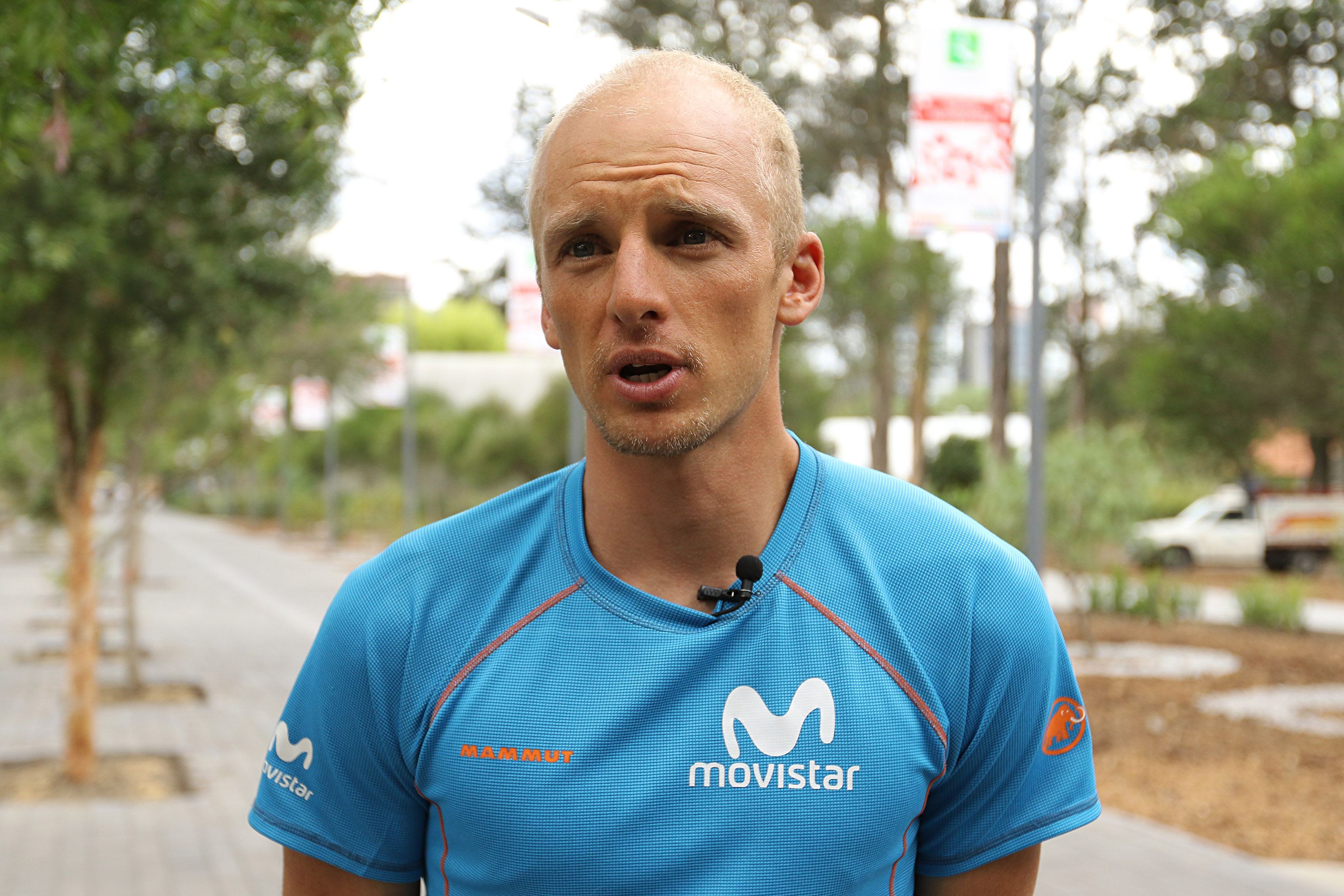
- Egloff in 2025
- Born: March 16, 1981 (age 45); Ecuador
- Occupations: Speed climber, mountain guide, cyclist
- Website: karlegloff.com

Karl Egloff (born March 16, 1981, Ecuador) is a Swiss-Ecuadorian athlete, mountaineer, cyclist and mountain guide, best known for his speed ascents of high mountains, including the Seven Summits.

== Early life and education ==
Egloff was born on March 16, 1981, in Ecuador, to a Swiss father and Ecuadorian mother. He climbed mountains from an early age, assisting his father with his mountain guiding business from the age of 15. When he was 17 he moved to Zürich, Switzerland to study for a degree in business administration. While in Switzerland he served in the Swiss Army and tried unsuccessfully to train as a professional footballer.

At the age of 25 he returned to Ecuador and established his own mountain guiding business. He took up mountain biking and raced with the Ecuador national team for two years.

== Mountaineering ==
In 2012, he began focusing on guiding and climbing, and began doing speed ascents of mountains.

In December 2012, achieved a record speed ascent of Cotopaxi, climbing up and down in 1 hour 37 minutes. He came to international attention in August 2014 when he broke the athlete Kilian Jornet's record for a speed ascent of Kilimanjaro, climbing up and down in 6 hours 42 minutes. In February 2015 he also broke Jornet's record on Aconcagua, climbing up and down in 11 hours 52 minutes.

In June 2019, he broke Kilian Jornet's speed record on Denali by a single minute, climbing up and down in 11 hours 44 minutes. A notable feature of this ascent is that while Jornet used skis for his descent, therefore descending much more quickly, Egloff ran and climbed back down again.

Karl Egloff trains intensively in his basement for new high-altitude speed records. In May 2025, he attempted to go from Base Camp to the summit of Mount Everest and back to Base Camp in under 24 hours, without supplemental oxygen. Shortly before reaching Camp 3 at 7,000 meters, he decided to abandon the project due to the wind and humidity.

=== Speed ascent records ===
- 2022. Makalu, Nepal, (8,463 m). 17 hours 18 minutes, 8 May 2022.
- 2021. Cotopaxi, Ecuador, (5,897 m). 1 hour 36 minutes, 19 October 2021.
- 2019. Denali, United States of America, (6,194 m). 11 hours 44 minutes, 20 June 2019.
- 2017. Elbrus, Russia, (5,642 m). 4 hours 20 minutes, 7 May 2017.
- 2015. Aconcagua, Argentina, (6,962 m). 11 hours 52 minutes, 19 February 2015.
- 2016. Cerro Plomo, Chile, (5,424 m). 5 hours 55 minutes, 6 January 2016.
- 2016. Huascarán, Peru, (6,655 m). 11 hours 0 minutes, 30 June 2016.
- 2014. Kilimanjaro, Tanzania, (5,895 m). 6 hours 42 minutes, 13 August 2014.
