= Sainte-Léocadie =

Sainte-Léocadie Santa Llocaia
- Commune
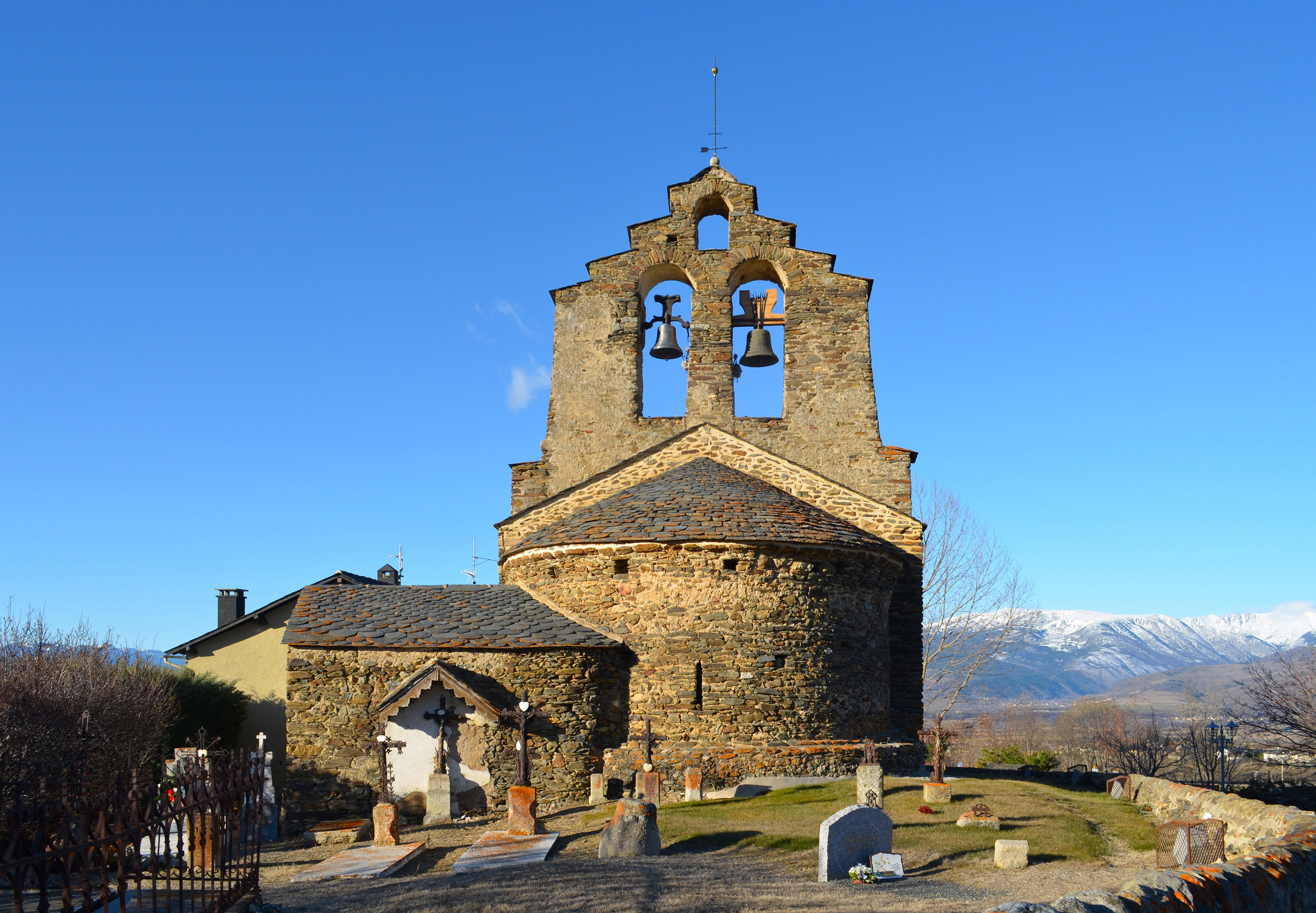
- The church in Sainte-Léocadie

- Coat of arms
- Location of Sainte-Léocadie
- Location within France Location within Occitanie
- Coordinates: 42°26′15″N 2°00′15″E
- Country: France
- Region: Occitania
- Department: Pyrénées-Orientales
- Arrondissement: Prades
- Canton: Les Pyrénées catalanes

Government
  - Mayor (2020–2026): Jean-Marie Aris
- Area^{1}: 8.88 km^{2} (3.43 sq mi)
- Elevation: 1,286 m (4,219 ft)
- Highest elevation: 2,043 m (6,703 ft)
- Lowest elevation: 1,193 m (3,914 ft)
- Population (2023): 157
  - Density: 17.7/km^{2} (45.8/sq mi)
- Time zone: UTC+01:00 (CET)
  - Summer (DST): UTC+02:00 (CEST)
- INSEE/Postal code: 66181 /66800
- ^{1} French Land Register data, which excludes lakes, ponds, glaciers > 1 km^{2} (0.386 sq mi or 247 acres) and river estuaries.

Sainte-Léocadie (French pronunciation: [sɛ̃t leɔkadi]; Catalan: Santa Llocaia, named after the catholic saint Leocadia) is a commune in the Pyrénées-Orientales department in southern France.

== Geography ==
Sainte-Léocadie is located in the canton of Les Pyrénées catalanes and in the arrondissement of Prades. Sainte-Léocadie station has rail connections to Villefranche-de-Conflent and Latour-de-Carol.

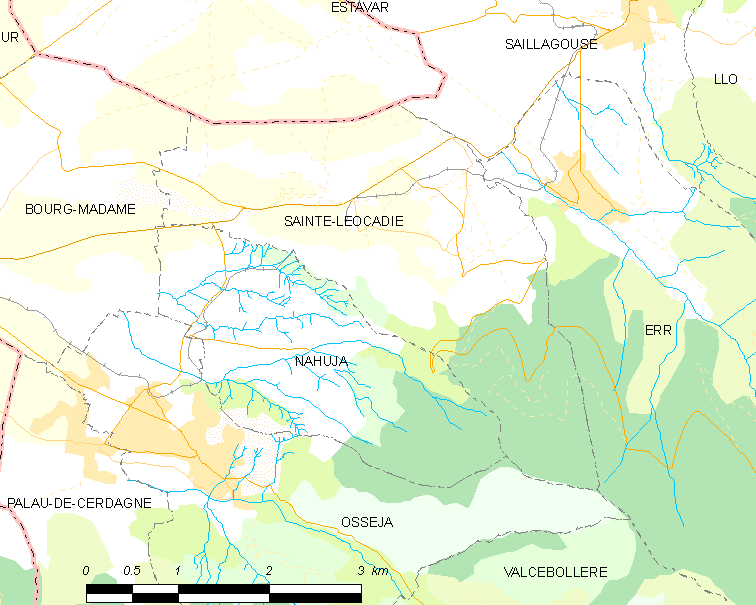
Map of Sainte-Léocadie and its surrounding communes

=== Climate ===
Climate data for Sainte-Léocadie (1981–2010 averages, records 1981–present)
Month	Jan	Feb	Mar	Apr	May	Jun	Jul	Aug	Sep	Oct	Nov	Dec	Year
Record high °C (°F)	20.0 (68.0)	20.4 (68.7)	22.6 (72.7)	26.1 (79.0)	30.2 (86.4)	32.6 (90.7)	36.4 (97.5)	36.2 (97.2)	31.2 (88.2)	26.9 (80.4)	25.5 (77.9)	17.4 (63.3)	36.2 (97.2)
Mean daily maximum °C (°F)	6.7 (44.1)	8.2 (46.8)	11.1 (52.0)	12.7 (54.9)	16.8 (62.2)	21.4 (70.5)	24.9 (76.8)	24.4 (75.9)	20.5 (68.9)	15.7 (60.3)	10.4 (50.7)	7.2 (45.0)	15.0 (59.0)
Daily mean °C (°F)	2.4 (36.3)	3.3 (37.9)	5.7 (42.3)	7.4 (45.3)	11.3 (52.3)	15.4 (59.7)	18.4 (65.1)	18.1 (64.6)	14.7 (58.5)	10.6 (51.1)	5.8 (42.4)	3.1 (37.6)	9.7 (49.5)
Mean daily minimum °C (°F)	−1.9 (28.6)	−1.6 (29.1)	0.3 (32.5)	2.1 (35.8)	5.8 (42.4)	9.4 (48.9)	11.9 (53.4)	11.8 (53.2)	8.9 (48.0)	5.5 (41.9)	1.3 (34.3)	−1.1 (30.0)	4.4 (39.9)
Record low °C (°F)	−17.0 (1.4)	−13.0 (8.6)	−12.5 (9.5)	−7.5 (18.5)	−3.2 (26.2)	−0.3 (31.5)	2.5 (36.5)	1.0 (33.8)	−1.4 (29.5)	−6.3 (20.7)	−11.2 (11.8)	−11.4 (11.5)	−17.0 (1.4)
Average precipitation mm (inches)	33.2 (1.31)	21.6 (0.85)	32.1 (1.26)	45.4 (1.79)	71.1 (2.80)	61.0 (2.40)	53.4 (2.10)	62.8 (2.47)	55.3 (2.18)	48.9 (1.93)	47.5 (1.87)	35.0 (1.38)	567.3 (22.33)
Average precipitation days (≥ 1.0 mm)	5.5	4.3	4.9	7.8	10.0	8.2	6.3	7.2	6.4	6.0	5.4	5.2	77.3
Source: Météo France

== Population ==
Historical population
Year	Pop.	±% p.a.
1968	74	—
1975	74	+0.00%
1982	81	+1.30%
1990	116	+4.59%
1999	140	+2.11%
2007	138	−0.18%
2012	144	+0.85%
2017	127	−2.48%
2023	157	+3.60%
Source: INSEE

== See also ==
- Communes of the Pyrénées-Orientales department
