= Communauté de communes Pyrénées Cerdagne =

French community of communes

The Pyrénées Cerdanya Community of Municipalities · is a community of communes in the Pyrénées-Orientales department in the Occitanie region in southern France. As of 2022, it had 8,709 inhabitants.

== History ==
It was created on 23/12/1996, with effect from 31/12/1996. On 1 janvier 2014, the municipalities of Dorres, Llo and Porta joined the community of municipalities.
