= Fastest known time =

Speed record

A fastest known time (FKT) is the speed record for a running, hiking, or cycling route. Unlike most endurance sports competitions such as marathon world records, FKTs are self-organized and done alone or in small groups. FKTs are most popular on long trails suitable for thru-hiking or ultramarathon trail running such as the Appalachian Trail, the Pennine Way, and the John Muir Trail.

== History ==
Informal, unverified speed records have long existed on named trails, but the invention of handheld GPS devices, such as GPS watches or personal locator beacons, made it significantly easier and more reliable to collect and compare fastest times on a route even in the backcountry. The modern FKT movement has been cataloged on a tracking website, fastestknowntime.com, founded by outdoor enthusiasts Pete Bakwin and Buzz Burrell, who coined the term "FKT" in 2000.

FKT popularity increased most recently due to trail races being cancelled due to the COVID-19 pandemic. While there is no governing body for certifying FKTs, the site acts as an informal arbiter, sometimes requiring additional certification like photographs and pre-announcing your intent to attempt a record.

In March 2022, FastestKnownTime.com was sold to Outside Inc., the parent company of Outside magazine and other outdoor media companies.

== FKT categories ==
FastestKnownTime.com tracks records in three styles:

- "Unsupported" athletes must carry all of their supplies except for water from naturally occurring sources.
- "Self-supported" athletes are allowed any support that is equally available to all people. For example, sleeping at a hotel is allowed, but sleeping at a friend's house is not.
- "Supported" athletes are allowed support of any kind except physical assistance in moving.

== See also ==
- Peak bagging
- List of fastest known times for Pyrenees routes and summits
