= Lac des Bouillouses =

Lac des Bouillouses Llac de la Bollosa
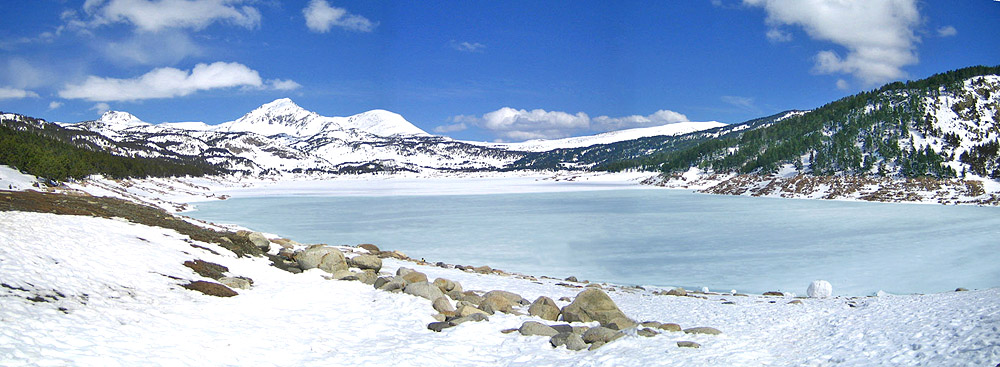

- Location within Pyrenees
- Location: Pyrénées-Orientales
- Coordinates: 42.570225°N 1.999426°E
- Type: reservoir
- Primary outflows: Têt
- Basin countries: France
- Surface area: 1.49 km^{2} (0.58 sq mi)
- Max. depth: 25 m (82 ft)
- Water volume: 17,500,000 m^{3} (620,000,000 cu ft)
- Surface elevation: 2,017 m (6,617 ft)

Lac des Bouillouses (French pronunciation: [lak de bujuz]) or Llac de la Bollosa is a lake in Pyrénées-Orientales, France. At an elevation of 2017 m, its surface area is 1.49 km².

It is an artificial lake, the 20-metre high dam of which was built between 1903 and 1910 as a key part of a hydro-electricity project in the Têt valley.

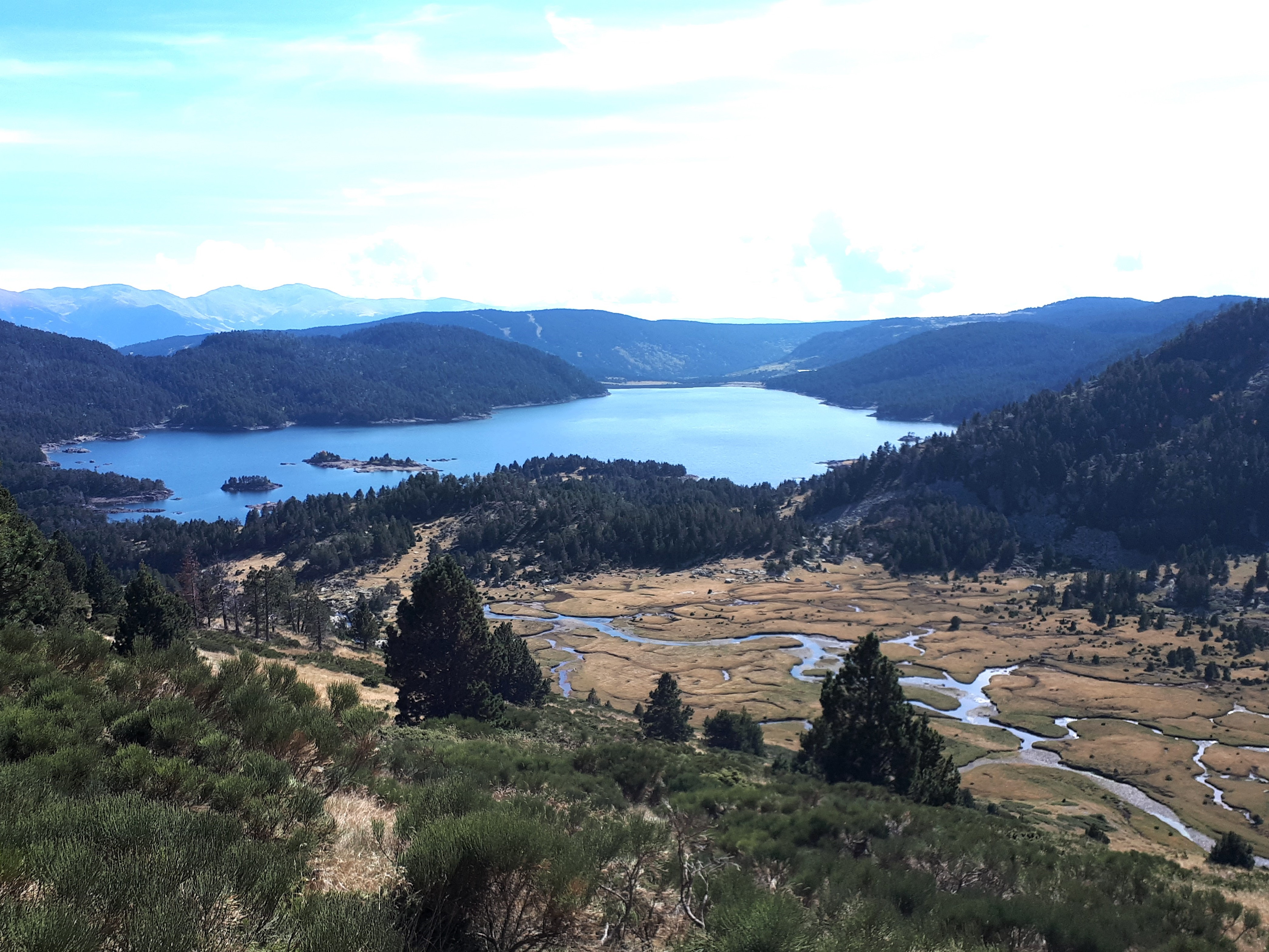
The lake is fed by River Têt (below, on the right).

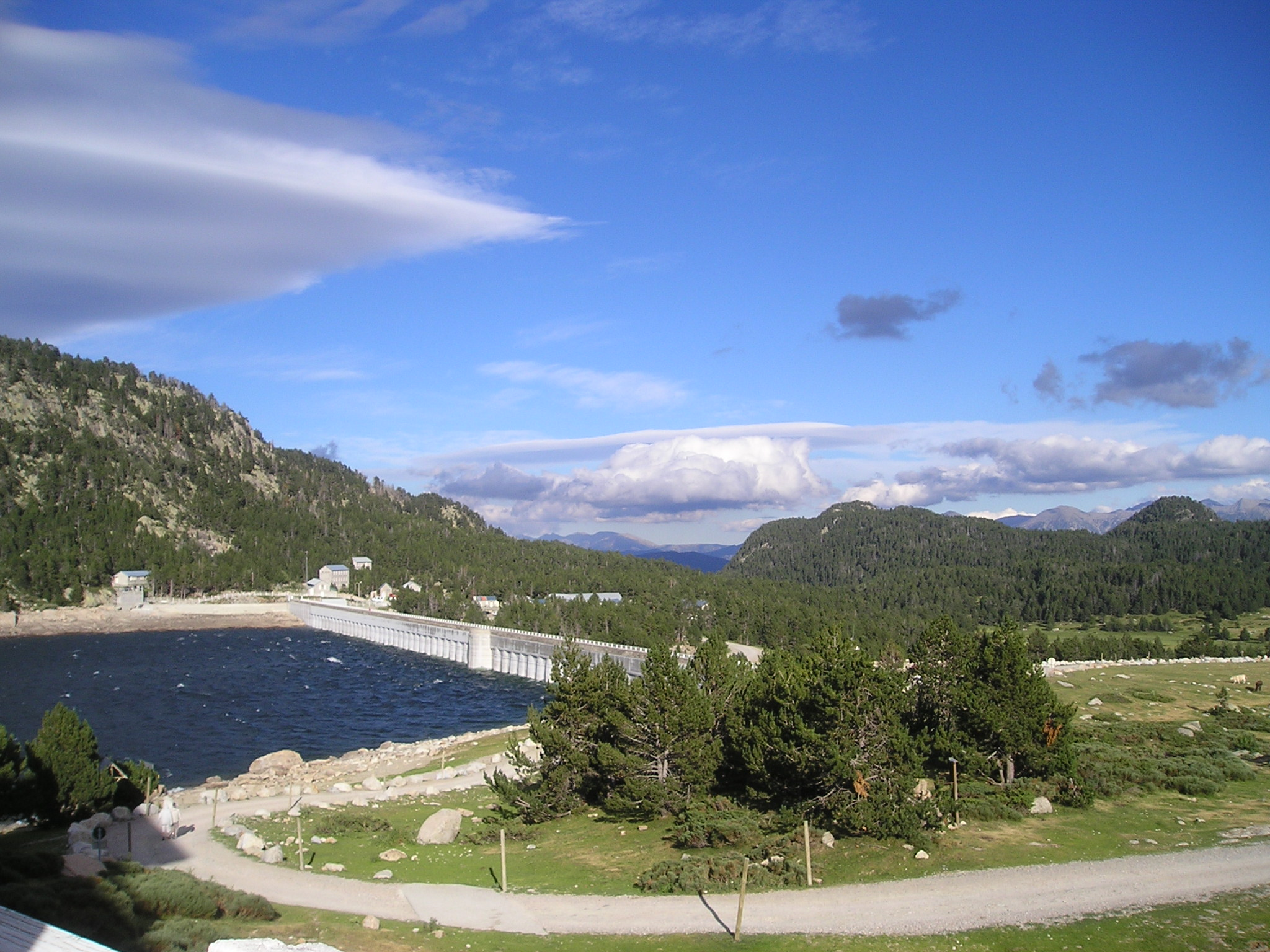
The dam at the southern end of the lake.
