= Angoustrine-Villeneuve-des-Escaldes =

- Commune
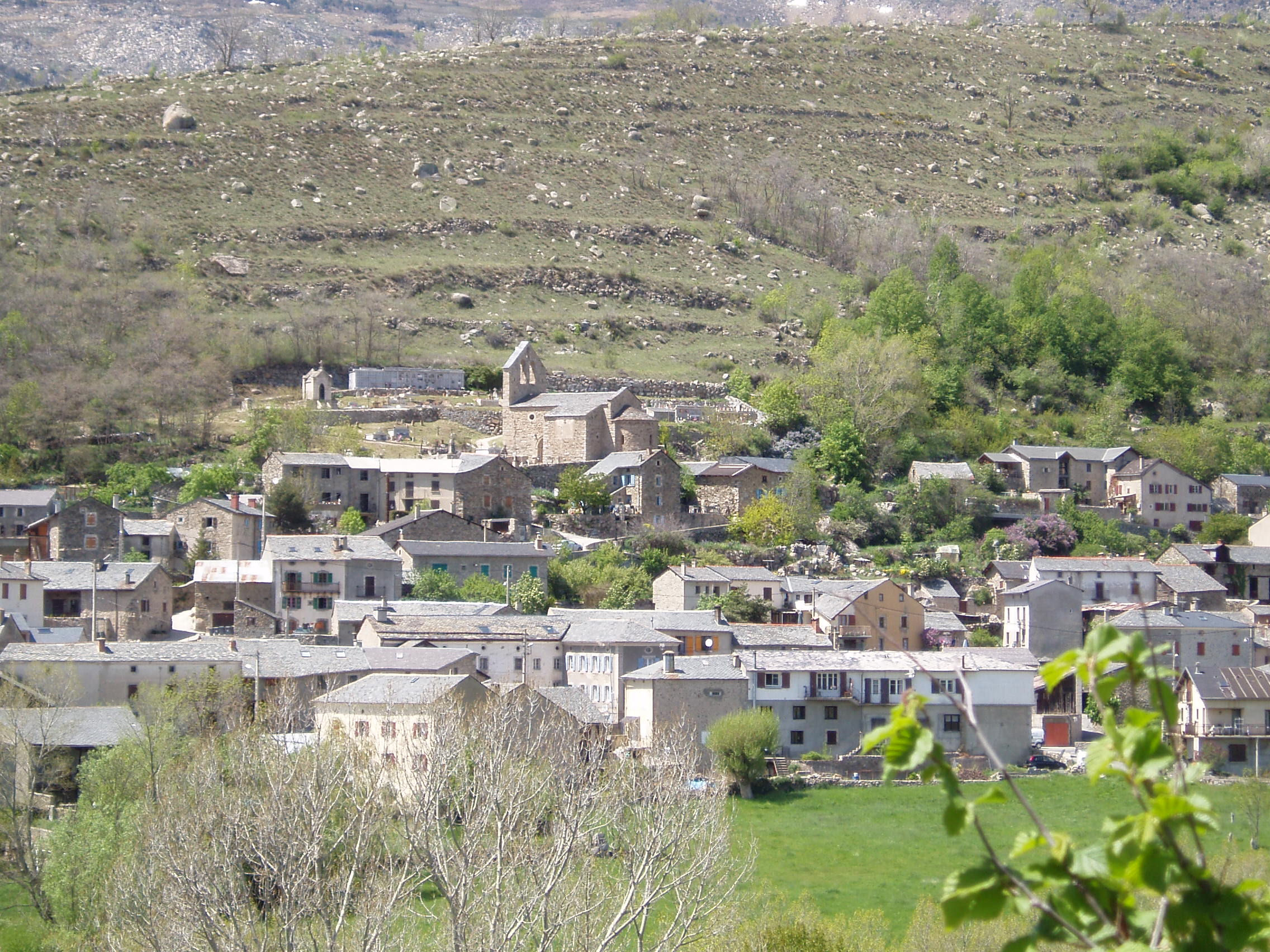
- A general view of Angoustrine-Villeneuve-des-Escaldes
- Location of Angoustrine-Villeneuve-des-Escaldes
- Location within France Location within Occitanie
- Coordinates: 42°28′43″N 1°57′12″E
- Country: France
- Region: Occitania
- Department: Pyrénées-Orientales
- Arrondissement: Prades
- Canton: Les Pyrénées catalanes
- Intercommunality: Pyrénées Cerdagne

Government
  - Mayor (2026–32): Brice Bouvier
- Area^{1}: 87.87 km^{2} (33.93 sq mi)
- Elevation: 1,380 m (4,530 ft)
- Highest elevation: 2,886 m (9,469 ft)
- Lowest elevation: 1,235 m (4,052 ft)
- Population (2023): 542
  - Density: 6.17/km^{2} (16.0/sq mi)
- Time zone: UTC+01:00 (CET)
  - Summer (DST): UTC+02:00 (CEST)
- INSEE/Postal code: 66005 /66760
- ^{1} French Land Register data, which excludes lakes, ponds, glaciers > 1 km^{2} (0.386 sq mi or 247 acres) and river estuaries.

Angoustrine-Villeneuve-des-Escaldes (French pronunciation: [ɑ̃ɡustʁin vilnœv de.z‿ɛskald]; Catalan: Angostrina i Vilanova de les Escaldes) is a commune in the Pyrénées-Orientales department in southern France.

== Geography ==
=== Localisation ===
Angoustrine-Villeneuve-des-Escaldes is located in the canton of Les Pyrénées catalanes and in the arrondissement of Prades.

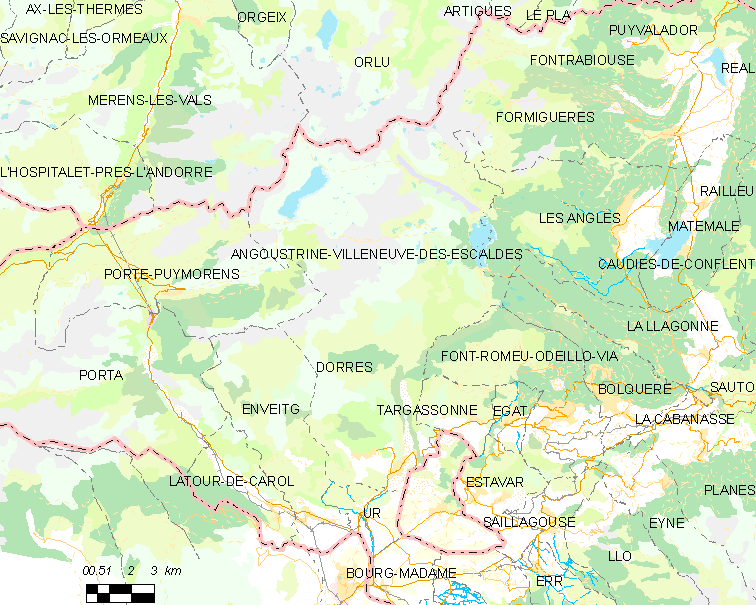
Map of Angoustrine-Villeneuve-des-Escaldes and its surrounding communes

== Government and politics ==
=== Mayors ===
Mayor	Term start	Term end
Louis Clerc	1973	1989
Jacques de Maury	1989	1995
Hélène Josende	1995	2020
Christian Pallares	2020	2026
Brice Bouvier	2026	incumbent

== Population ==
Historical population
Year	Pop.	±% p.a.
1968	505	—
1975	573	+1.82%
1982	556	−0.43%
1990	600	+0.96%
1999	549	−0.98%
2007	637	+1.88%
2012	691	+1.64%
2017	608	−2.53%
2023	542	−1.90%
Source: INSEE

== Sites of interest ==
- Saint-André d'Angoustrine church, romanesque (12th c.).
- Saint-Martin d'Envalls chapel, romanesque.
- Saint-Assiscle et Sainte-Victoire de Villeneuve-des-Escaldes church, romanesque.
- The new Saint-André d'Angoustrine church, built in the 19th century.

== See also ==
- Communes of the Pyrénées-Orientales department
