= Federico Galera (mountaineer) =

Spanish ski mountaineer

Personal information
- Full name: Federico Galera Díez
- Born: 11 February 1978 (age 48) Madrid, Spain

Sport
- Sport: Skiing

Federico Galera Díez (born 11 February 1978) is a Spanish ski mountaineer and mountain runner.

Galera was born in Madrid. He started ski mountaineering in 1996 and competed first in the same year. His twin brother Carlos is also a ski mountaineer.

== Selected results ==
=== Ski mountaineering ===
He won two European "espoirs" class champion titles, was Spanish champion and winner of a Spanish Cup in the same class. In 1998 he became a member of the national ski mountaineering team, was three times Spanish Cup winner and four times Spanish champion in the "seniors" class.

- 2001:
  - 9th, European Championship team race (together with his brother Carlos)
- 2006:
  - 6th, World Championship relay race (together with Javier Martín de Villa, Manuel Pérez Brunicardi and Agustí Roc Amador

==== Patrouille des Glaciers ====
- 2000: 6th ("seniors I" class ranking), together with Manuel Pérez Brunicardi and Jorge Palacio Sanz
- 2010: 9th ("seniors II" class ranking), together with Carlos Galera Díez and Francisco Javier Rodriguez Bodas

=== Mountain running ===
- 1st, Cross Alpino del Telégrafo
