= Costabona =

Mountain on the border between Spain and France

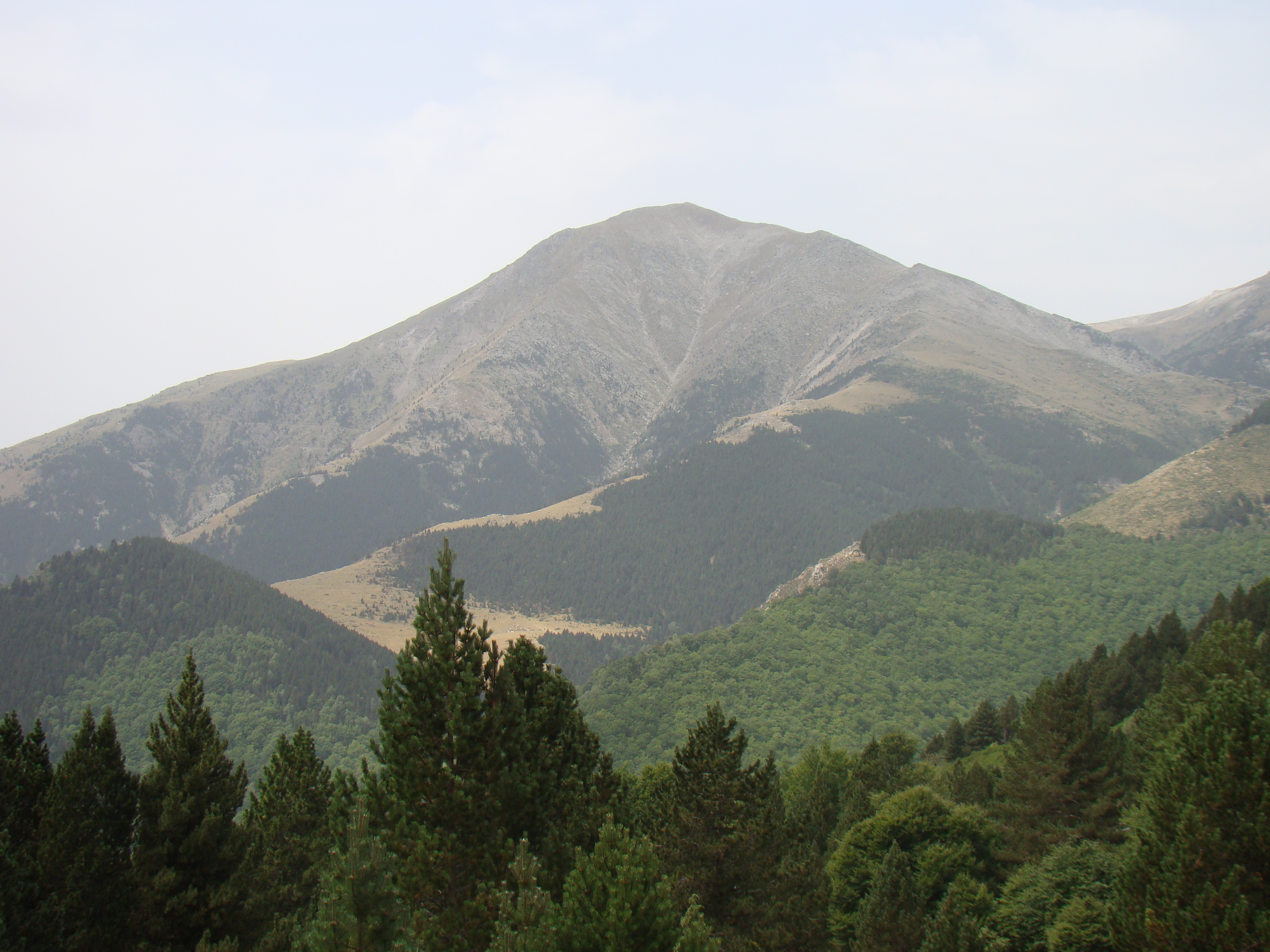

Highest point
- Elevation: 2,465 m (8,087 ft)
- Coordinates: 42.4169°N 2.3439°E

Geography
- Location within Pyrenees
- Location: Catalonia, Spain
- Parent range: Pyrenees

Costabona (in Spanish and Catalan, Costabonne in French) is a mountain of Catalonia, on the border between Spain and France. Located in the Pyrenees, it has an altitude of 2464 metres above sea level.

== See also ==
- Mountains of Catalonia
