= Tuc de Molières =

Mountain in Catalonia, Spain

Coordinates: 42°37′46″N 0°41′55″E

Tuc de Molières Pic Molières
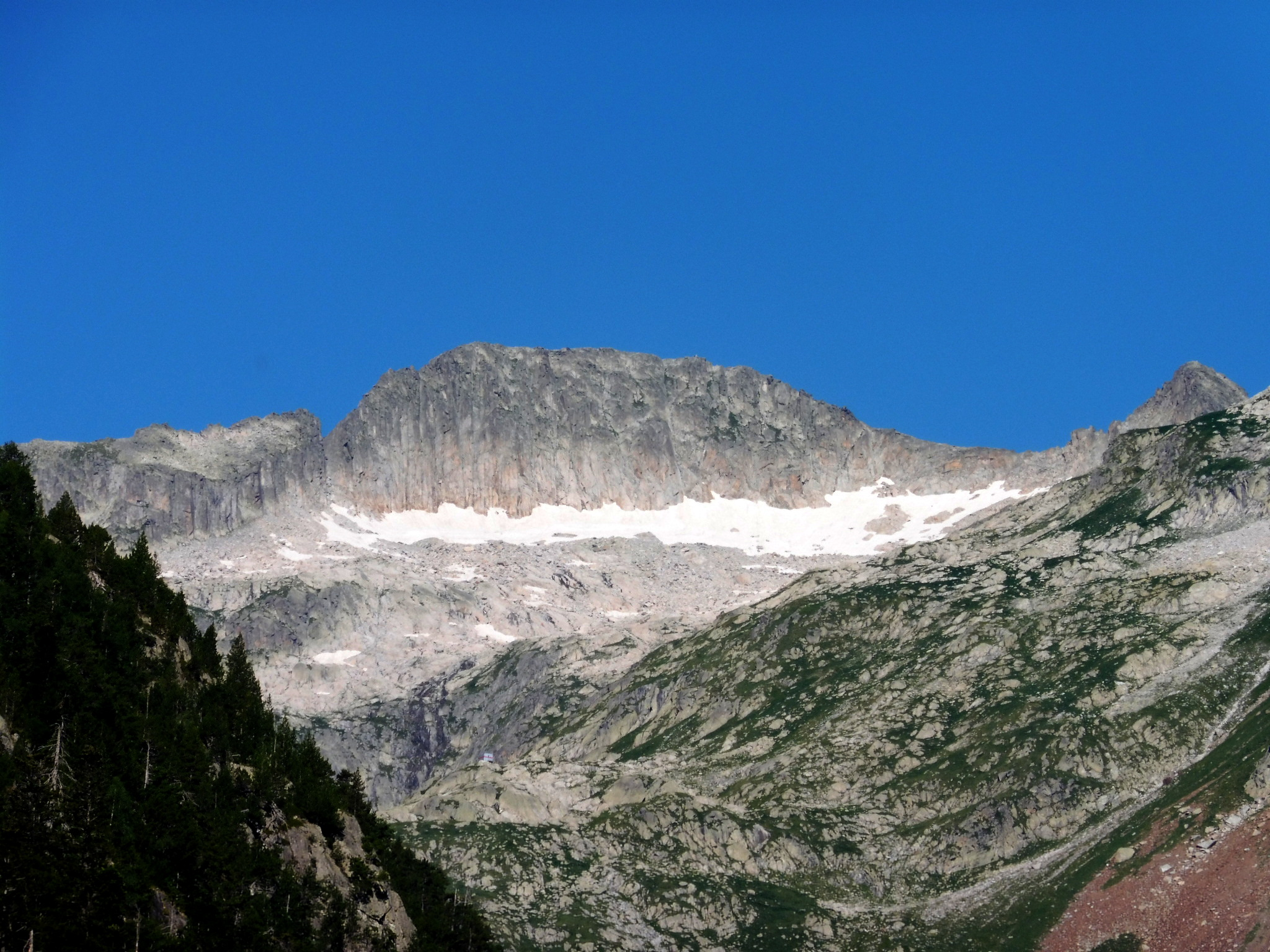

Highest point
- Elevation: 3,011 m (9,879 ft)
- Listing: Mountains in Catalonia

Geography
- Location within Catalonia
- Location: Catalonia, (Spain)
- Parent range: Pyrenees

Tuc de Molières (Spanish: Pico Mulleres; Catalan: Pic Molières) is a mountain located in Catalonia, Spain. Located in the Pyrenees, it has an elevation of 3,011 metres above sea level.
