= Carlit =

Mountain in France

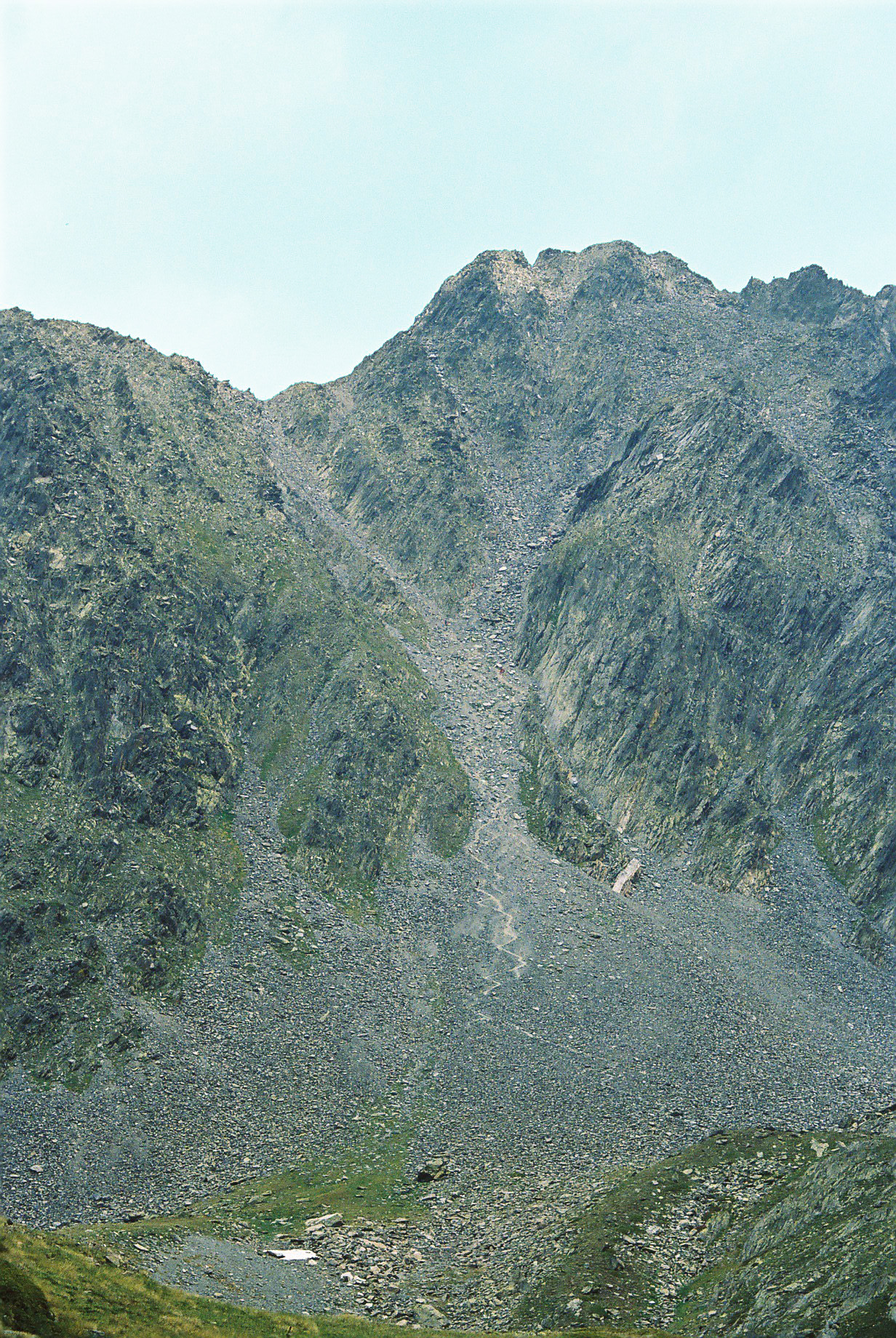
- North face of Carlit, summer 2007

Highest point
- Elevation: 2,921 m (9,583 ft)
- Prominence: 1,001 m (3,284 ft)
- Listing: Ribu
- Coordinates: 42°34′11″N 1°55′55″E

Geography
- Location within Pyrenees
- Location: Pyrénées-Orientales, France
- Parent range: Pyrenees

Pic Carlit (Puig Carlit in Catalan) is a mountain of Pyrénées-Orientales, France. Located in the Pyrenees, it has an elevation of 2,921 metres (9,583 ft) metres above sea level.

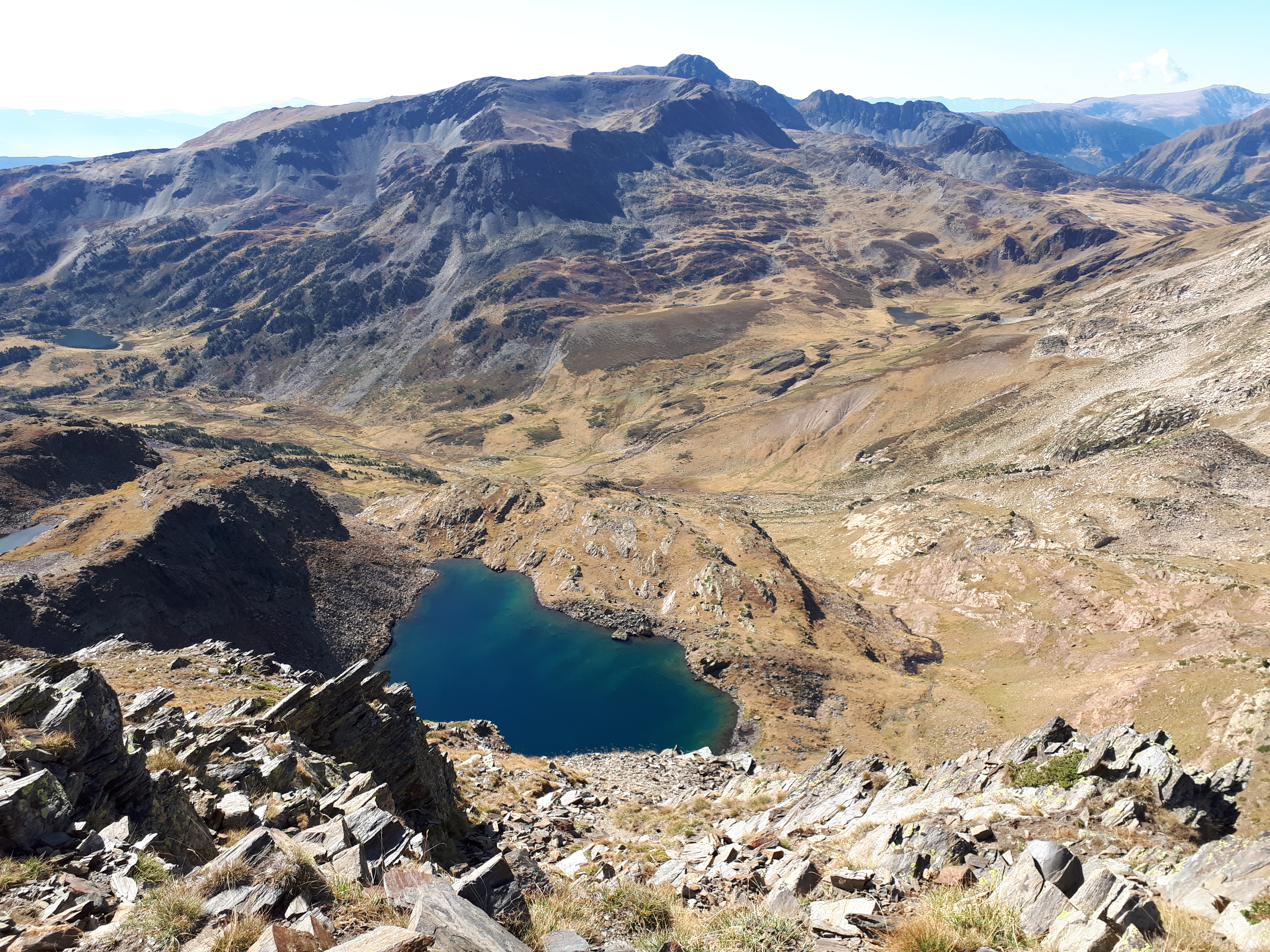
View from the north towards Pic Carlit (centre, in the far distance). The peak is a monadnock which rises above surrounding mountains, plateaus and valleys.

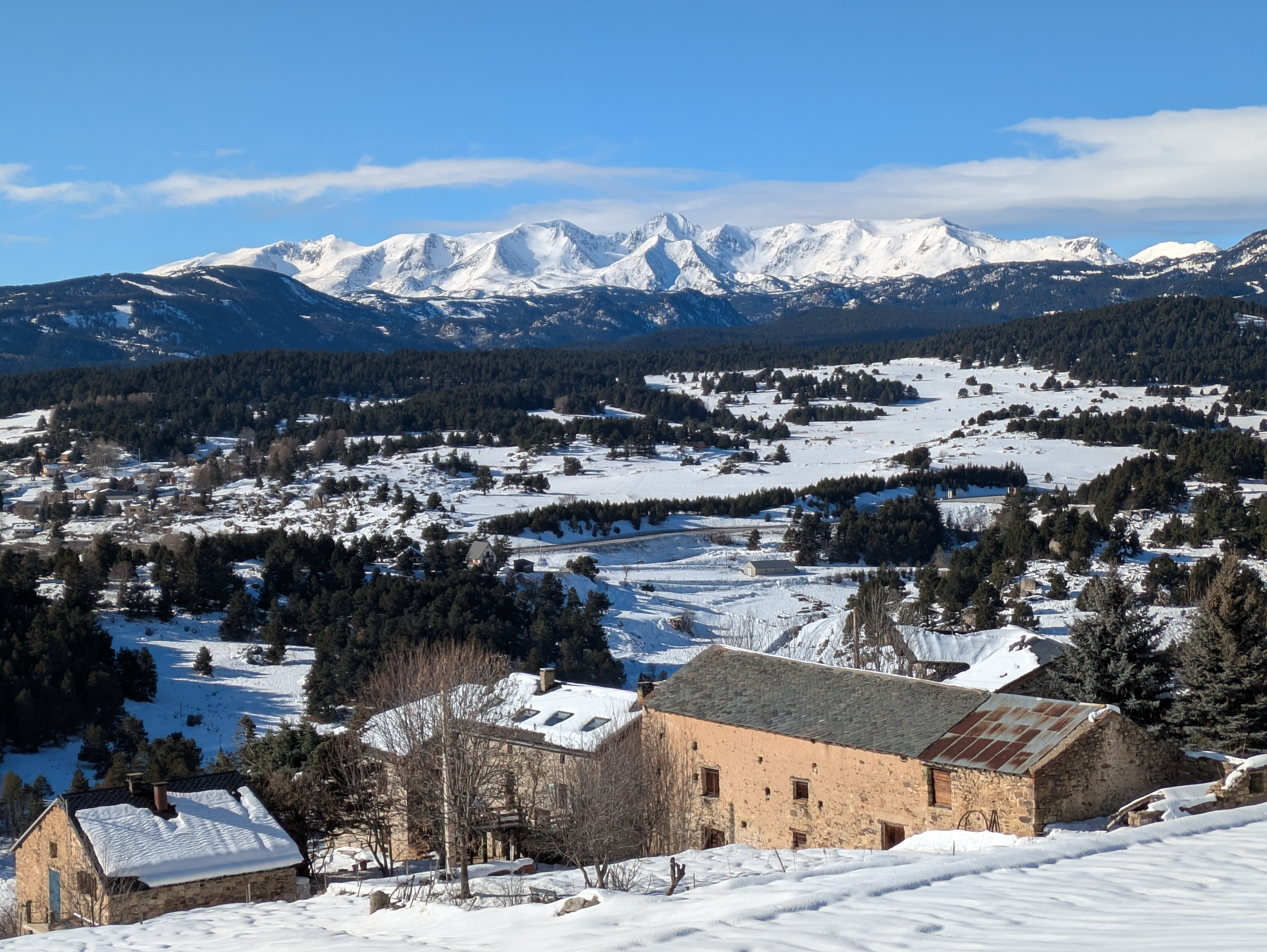
Pic Carlit (centre, in the distance), from the south-east (La Llagonne).

== History ==
Henry Russell is known to have made the first ascent of the Pic Carlit in 1864, where he was fascinated by the beautiful view of the Étang du Lanoux, the biggest lake of the Pyrénées.

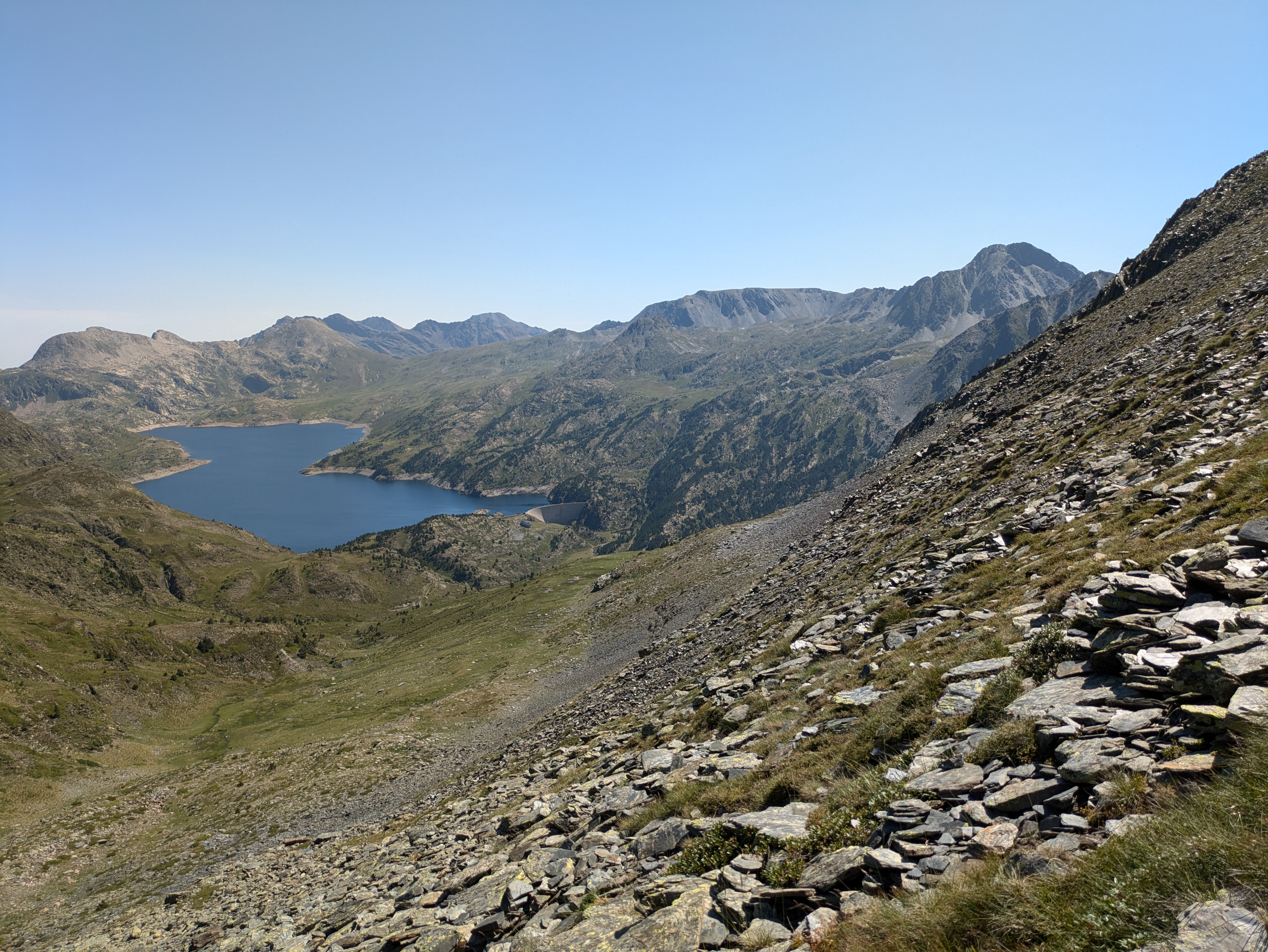
Étang de Lanoux, and Pic Carlit (far right).

== See also ==
- List of French mountains by prominence
