= Puigmal =

Mountain in the Pyrenees

- Puigmal d'Err
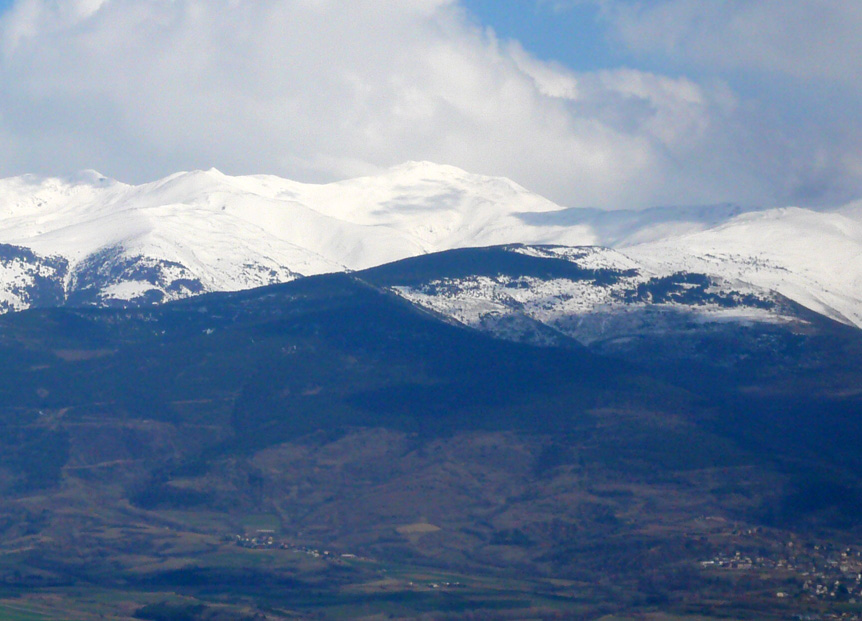

Highest point
- Elevation: 2,910 m (9,550 ft)
- Coordinates: 42°23′00″N 02°07′00″E

Geography
- Location within Pyrenees
- Location: Pyrénées-Orientales, France; Catalonia, Spain
- Parent range: Pyrenees

Climbing
- Easiest route: Station d'Err ski resort 1971m (France); Nuria 1972m, or new road from Queralbs to 2000m (Spain) - all easy in a short day (Nuria is finest approach).

The Peak of Puigmal (Catalan pronunciation: [ˌpudʒˈmal]), also called Puigmal d'Err, is a mountain in the Pyrenees, in the Spanish-French border, within the limits of the municipality of Queralbs and the commune of Err. Its summit is 2,909.6 metres (9,546 ft) above sea level, one of the highest peaks in the eastern Pyrenees. Puigmal d'Err is near the west end of a fine ridge over 2500m high for 16 km. The west half is composed of friable metasediments (schists) which break down to form smooth slopes, and so give easy walking. The east half is of tougher gneiss and forms spiky alpine scenery with sharp crests and some difficult places. Several excellent circuits can be made from Nuria. The plateau summit of Puigmal d'Err is split for several hundred metres by a bold scarp, in places over 20 metres high, with the eastern half having slipped bodily towards Nuria. This is clearly seen on GoogleEarth. Several other crests in this range are likewise split.

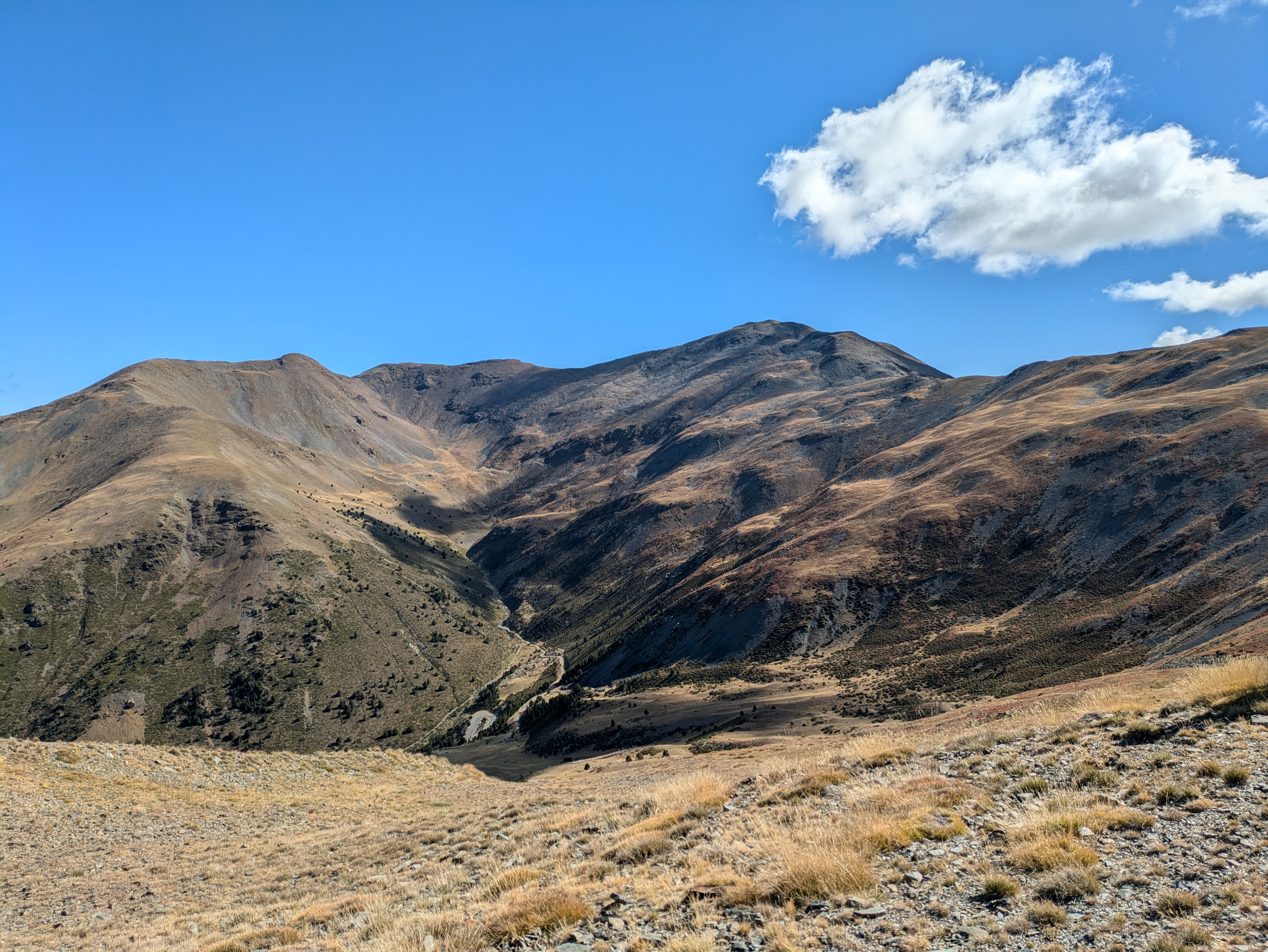
The French side of Puigmal d'Err, looking east. The upper part of the Ribera d'Err valley is to the left of the mountain, and access on foot to the summit can be gained from that valley.

== See also ==
- Vall de Núria
- List of mountains in Catalonia
