= 2025–26 ISMF Ski Mountaineering World Cup =

Annual ski mountaineering competition

Discipline	Men	Women
Overall	(Switzerland) Rémi Bonnet	(Italy) Giulia Murada
Individual	(Switzerland) Rémi Bonnet	(Italy) Alba De Silvestro
Sprint	(France) Thibault Anselmet	(France) Margot Ravinel
Vertical	(Switzerland) Rémi Bonnet	(France) Axelle Gachet-Mollaret

Competition
Edition	20th	20th
Locations	8	8
Individual	15	15
Mixed	4	4
Cancelled	2	2

The 2025–26 ISMF Ski Mountaineering World Cup, organized by International Ski Mountaineering Federation (ISMF), was the 20th World Cup in ski mountaineering for men and women.

The season started on 6 December 2025 in Solitude, Utah, United States and concluded on 5 April 2026 in Villars-sur-Ollon, Switzerland.

== Men ==
=== Calendar ===
Event key: SP – Sprint, VE - Vertical, IN – Individual
#	Date	Place	Type	Winner	Second	Third	U23 Winner	R.
1	7 December 2025	(United States) Solitude	SP	(Switzerland) Jon Kistler	(Switzerland) Arno Lietha	(Belgium) Maximilien Drion du Chapois		
2	15 January 2026	(France) Courchevel	SP	(Spain) Oriol Cardona Coll	(France) Thibault Anselmet	(Individual Neutral Athletes) Nikita Filippov		
3	16 January 2026	(France) Courchevel	VE	(Switzerland) Rémi Bonnet	(Switzerland) Aurélien Gay	(Spain) Oriol Cardona Coll		
4	25 January 2026	Andorra	VE	(Switzerland) Rémi Bonnet	(Austria) Paul Verbnjak	(Italy) Matteo Sostizzo		
	26 January 2026	Andorra	SP	Cancelled				
5	31 January 2026	(Spain) Boí Taüll	SP	(France) Thibault Anselmet	(Spain) Oriol Cardona Coll	(Individual Neutral Athletes) Nikita Filippov		
6	4 March 2026	(Azerbaijan) Şahdağ	SP	(Individual Neutral Athletes) Nikita Filippov	(Switzerland) Thomas Bussard	(Spain) Ot Ferrer Martinez	(Switzerland) Jon Kistler	
7	6 March 2026	(Azerbaijan) Şahdağ	IN	(Switzerland) Rémi Bonnet	(Switzerland) Thomas Bussard	(Austria) Johannes Lohfeyer	(Austria) Johannes Lohfeyer	
8	8 March 2026	(Azerbaijan) Şahdağ	VE	(Switzerland) Rémi Bonnet	(Switzerland) Aurélien Gay	(Austria) Christof Hochenwarter	(Austria) Julian Tritscher	
	19 March 2026	(Italy) Val Martello	IN	Cancelled				
9	22 March 2026	(Italy) Val Martello	SP	(Spain) Oriol Cardona Coll	(Switzerland) Arno Lietha	(Individual Neutral Athletes) Nikita Filippov		
10	25 March 2026	(France) Puy-Saint-Vincent	IN	(Switzerland) Rémi Bonnet	(France) William Bon Mardion	(France) Xavier Gachet		
11	26 March 2026	(France) Puy-Saint-Vincent	VE	(Switzerland) Rémi Bonnet	(France) Anselme Damevin	(Spain) Antonio Alcalde Sánchez		
12	27 March 2026	(France) Puy-Saint-Vincent	SP	(France) Thibault Anselmet	(Switzerland) Thomas Bussard	(Italy) Nicolò Ernesto Canclini		
13	1 April 2026	(Switzerland) Villars-sur-Ollon	VE	(Switzerland) Rémi Bonnet	(Switzerland) Aurélien Gay	(Austria) Paul Verbnjak		
14	2 April 2026	(Switzerland) Villars-sur-Ollon	IN	(Switzerland) Rémi Bonnet	(France) William Bon Mardion	(Austria) Paul Verbnjak		
15	4 April 2026	(Switzerland) Villars-sur-Ollon	SP	(Switzerland) Jon Kistler	(France) Thibault Anselmet	(Spain) Oriol Cardona Coll		

=== Standings ===
==== Overall ====
Rank	after 15 of 15 events	Points
1	(Switzerland) Rémi Bonnet	816
2	(Austria) Paul Verbnjak	728
3	(France) Thibault Anselmet	684
4	(Switzerland) Thomas Bussard	632
5	(Spain) Aurélien Gay	563

==== Sprint ====
Rank	after 7 of 7 events	Points
1	(France) Thibault Anselmet	431
2	(Spain) Oriol Cardona Coll	405
3	(Switzerland) Jon Kistler	402
4	(Switzerland) Arno Lietha	354
5	(Spain) Biel Pujol	336

==== Vertical ====
Rank	after 5 of 5 events	Points
1	(Switzerland) Rémi Bonnet	500
2	(Switzerland) Aurélien Gay	377
3	(Austria) Paul Verbnjak	376
4	(Austria) Christof Hochenwarter	267
5	(Spain) Antonio Alcalde Sánchez	267

==== Individual ====
Rank	after 3 of 3 events	Points
1	(Switzerland) Rémi Bonnet	300
2	(Austria) Paul Verbnjak	195
3	(Switzerland) Thomas Bussard	189
4	(France) William Bon Mardion	180
5	(Italy) Michele Boscacci	168

== Women ==
=== Calendar ===
Event key: SP – Sprint, VE - Vertical, IN – Individual
#	Date	Place	Type	Winner	Second	Third	U23 Winner	R.
1	7 December 2025	(United States) Solitude	SP	(France) Margot Ravinel	(Italy) Giulia Murada	(Italy) Katia Mascherona		
2	15 January 2026	(France) Courchevel	SP	(France) Emily Harrop	(France) Margot Ravinel	(Italy) Giulia Murada		
3	16 January 2026	(France) Courchevel	VE	(France) Axelle Gachet-Mollaret	(France) Emily Harrop	(Austria) Sarah Dreier		
4	25 January 2026	Andorra	VE	(France) Axelle Gachet-Mollaret	(France) Emily Harrop	(Austria) Sarah Dreier		
	26 January 2026	Andorra	SP	Cancelled				
5	31 January 2026	(Spain) Boí Taüll	SP	(France) Emily Harrop	(Italy) Giulia Murada	(France) Margot Ravinel		
6	4 March 2026	(Azerbaijan) Şahdağ	SP	(Switzerland) Marianne Fatton	(Italy) Giulia Murada	(Germany) Tatjana Paller	(Czech Republic) Eva Matějovičová	
7	6 March 2026	(Azerbaijan) Şahdağ	IN	(Italy) Giulia Murada	(Switzerland) Marianne Fatton	(Italy) Alba De Silvestro	(Switzerland) Thibe Deseyn	
8	8 March 2026	(Azerbaijan) Şahdağ	VE	(Austria) Sarah Dreier	(Italy) Giulia Murada	(Switzerland) Caroline Ulrich	(Switzerland) Thibe Deseyn	
	19 March 2026	(Italy) Val Martello	IN	Cancelled				
9	22 March 2026	(Italy) Val Martello	SP	(France) Emily Harrop	(Italy) Giulia Murada	(France) Margot Ravinel		
10	25 March 2026	(France) Puy-Saint-Vincent	IN	(France) Axelle Gachet-Mollaret	(Italy) Alba De Silvestro	(France) Emily Harrop		
11	26 March 2026	(France) Puy-Saint-Vincent	VE	(France) Axelle Gachet-Mollaret	(France) Emily Harrop	(Italy) Alba De Silvestro		
12	27 March 2026	(France) Puy-Saint-Vincent	SP	(France) Emily Harrop	(France) Margot Ravinel	(Italy) Giulia Murada		
13	1 April 2026	(Switzerland) Villars-sur-Ollon	VE	(France) Axelle Gachet-Mollaret	(France) Emily Harrop	(Austria) Johanna Hiemer		
14	2 April 2026	(Switzerland) Villars-sur-Ollon	IN	(France) Axelle Gachet-Mollaret	(France) Emily Harrop	(Austria) Johanna Hiemer		
15	4 April 2026	(Switzerland) Villars-sur-Ollon	SP	(France) Emily Harrop	(France) Margot Ravinel	(Italy) Giulia Murada		

=== Standings ===
==== Overall ====
Rank	after 15 of 15 events	Points
1	(Italy) Giulia Murada	1081
2	(France) Emily Harrop	1031
3	(France) Margot Ravinel	943
4	(France) Célia Perillat-Pessey	667
5	(Italy) Alba de Silvestro	660

==== Sprint ====
Rank	after 7 of 7 events	Points
1	(France) Margot Ravinel	532
2	(Italy) Giulia Murada	513
3	(France) Emily Harrop	500
4	(Germany) Tatjana Paller	363
5	(France) Célia Perillat-Pessey	346

==== Vertical ====
Rank	after 5 of 5 events	Points
1	(France) Axelle Gachet-Mollaret	400
2	(France) Emily Harrop	360
3	(Austria) Sarah Dreier	352
4	(Italy) Giulia Murada	342
5	(France) Margot Ravinel	285

==== Individual ====
Rank	after 3 of 3 events	Points
1	(Italy) Alba De Silvestro	244
2	(Italy) Giulia Murada	226
3	(France) Axelle Gachet-Mollaret	200
4	(Switzerland) Caroline Ulrich	174
5	(Switzerland) Marianne Fatton	172

== Team events ==
=== Mixed Relay ===
#	Date	Place	Winner	Second	Third	R.
1	6 December 2025	(United States) Solitude	United States Cameron Smith; Anna Gibson	Italy Michele Boscacci; Alba De Silvestro	Switzerland Arno Lietha; Thibe Deseyn	
2	1 February 2026	(Spain) Boí Taüll	France Thibault Anselmet; Emily Harrop	Spain Oriol Cardona Coll; Ana Alonso Rodriguez	Switzerland Jon Kistler; Marianne Fatton	
3	5 March 2026	(Azerbaijan) Şahdağ	Switzerland Marianne Fatton; Thomas Bussard	Italy Alba De Silvestro; Michele Boscacci	Germany Finn Hösch; Tatjana Paller	
4	21 March 2026	(Italy) Val Martello	Austria Johanna Hiemer; Paul Verbnjak	Italy Alba De Silvestro; Michele Boscacci	Spain Oriol Cardona Coll; Ana Alonso Rodriguez	
5	5 April 2026	(Switzerland) Villars-sur-Ollon	Spain Oriol Cardona Coll; Ana Alonso Rodriguez	Italy Alba De Silvestro; Michele Boscacci	France Thibault Anselmet; Célia Perillat-Pessey	

== Podium table by nation ==
Table showing the World Cup podium places (gold–1st place, silver–2nd place, bronze–3rd place) by the countries represented by the athletes.

Rank	Nation	Gold	Silver	Bronze	Total
1	France	15	14	4	33
2	Switzerland	12	9	3	24
3	Italy	2	9	8	19
4	Spain	2	2	5	9
5	Austria	2	1	9	12
6	Individual Neutral Athletes	1	0	3	4
7	United States	1	0	0	1
8	Germany	0	0	2	2
9	Belgium	0	0	1	1
Totals (9 entries)		35	35	35	105
