= Ski mountaineering at the 2026 Winter Olympics – Men's sprint =

Men's sprint at the XXV Olympic Winter Games
- Venue: Stelvio, Bormio
- Date: 19 February
- Competitors: 18 from 14 nations
- Winning time: 2:34.03

Medalists
1st place, gold medalist(s)		Oriol Cardona	Spain
2nd place, silver medalist(s)		Nikita Filippov	Individual Neutral Athletes
3rd place, bronze medalist(s)		Thibault Anselmet	France

The men's sprint competition in ski mountaineering at the 2026 Winter Olympics was held on 19 February at the Stelvio Ski Centre in Bormio, Italy. The event made its Olympic debut. It was won by Oriol Cardona of Spain. This was only the second Winter Olympic gold for Spain; Francisco Fernández Ochoa won the previous one in 1972 in alpine skiing. Russian Nikita Filippov, competing as an Individual Neutral Athlete, won the silver medal and Thibault Anselmet of France won bronze.

== Background ==
At the 2025–26 ISMF Ski Mountaineering World Cup, only three sprint events were held before the Olympics. Jon Kistler, Oriol Cardona and Thibault Anselmet won one each. The 2025 World champion was Cardona.

Ski mountaineering consists of skiing uphill with "skins" on the bottom of the ski; these are carpet-like coverings that provide grip to the skier. The athletes then remove their skis and place them in their backpack, before climbing a rise on foot. They then return to their skis to finish their climb. Once they reach the ascent, they remove the skins and ski downhill to the finish line.

== Results ==
=== Heats ===
Top 3 in each heat and the fastest 3 (LL) overall qualify to the Semifinals.

Heat 1

Rank	Bib	Athlete	Country	Time	Deficit	Note
1	1	Oriol Cardona	Spain	2:37.96		Q
2	6	Ot Ferrer	Spain	2:41.32	+3.36	Q
3	7	Pablo Giner Dalmasso	France	2:42.37	+4.41	Q
4	13	Bu Luer	China	2:43.89	+5.93	LL
5	18	Michele Boscacci	Italy	2:50.79	+12.83	
6	12	Paul Verbnjak	Austria	2:58.39	+20.43	

Heat 2

Rank	Bib	Athlete	Country	Time	Deficit	Note
1	2	Jon Kistler	Switzerland	2:38.36		Q
2	8	Nikita Filippov	Individual Neutral Athletes	2:39.84	+1.48	Q
3	5	Maximilien Drion	Belgium	2:42.40	+4.04	Q
4	14	Cameron Smith	United States	2:47.59	+9.23	LL
5	17	Phillip Bellingham	Australia	2:48.39	+10.03	LL
6	11	Trym Dalset Lødøen	Norway	2:55.87	+17.51	

Heat 3

Rank	Bib	Athlete	Country	Time	Deficit	Note
1	3	Arno Lietha	Switzerland	2:43.23		Q
2	4	Thibault Anselmet	France	2:46.98	+3.75	Q
3	9	Hans-Inge Klette	Norway	2:48.19	+4.96	Q
4	10	Finn Hösch	Germany	2:51.99	+8.76	
5	15	Jan Elantkowski	Poland	3:01.99	+18.76	
6	16	Jakub Šiarnik	Slovakia	3:02.29	+19.06	

=== Semifinals ===
Semifinal 1

Rank	Bib	Athlete	Country	Time	Deficit	Note
1	2	Jon Kistler	Switzerland	2:34.93		Q
2	1	Oriol Cardona	Spain	2:36.10	+1.17	Q
3	4	Thibault Anselmet	France	2:37.17	+2.24	LL
4	13	Bu Luer	China	2:47.04	+12.11	
5	9	Hans-Inge Klette	Norway	2:51.30	+16.37	
6	17	Phillip Bellingham	Australia	3:13.53	+38.60	

Semifinal 2

Rank	Bib	Athlete	Country	Time	Deficit	Note
1	3	Arno Lietha	Switzerland	2:33.79		Q
2	8	Nikita Filippov	Individual Neutral Athletes	2:34.53	+0.74	Q
3	6	Ot Ferrer	Spain	2:37.27	+3.48	LL
4	7	Pablo Giner Dalmasso	France	2:41.29	+7.50	
5	5	Maximilien Drion	Belgium	2:47.23	+13.44	
6	14	Cameron Smith	United States	2:50.74	+16.95	

=== Final ===
Rank	Bib	Athlete	Country	Time	Deficit
1st place, gold medalist(s)	1	Oriol Cardona	Spain	2:34.03	
2nd place, silver medalist(s)	8	Nikita Filippov	Individual Neutral Athletes	2:35.55	+1.52
3rd place, bronze medalist(s)	4	Thibault Anselmet	France	2:36.34	+2.31
4	3	Arno Lietha	Switzerland	2:39.07	+5.04
5	6	Ot Ferrer	Spain	2:54.45	+20.42
6	2	Jon Kistler	Switzerland	2:57.87	+23.84
