= 2024–25 ISMF Ski Mountaineering World Cup =

Annual ski mountaineering competition

Discipline	Men	Women
Overall	(France) Thibault Anselmet	(France) Emily Harrop
Individual	(Switzerland) Rémi Bonnet	(France) Axelle Gachet Mollaret
Sprint	(Spain) Oriol Cardona Coll	(France) Emily Harrop
Vertical	(Switzerland) Rémi Bonnet	(France) Emily Harrop

Competition
Edition	19th	19th
Locations	9	9
Individual	15	15
Mixed	5	5

The 2024–25 ISMF Ski Mountaineering World Cup, organized by International Ski Mountaineering Federation (ISMF), was the 19th World Cup in ski mountaineering for men and women.

The season started on 14 December 2024 in Courchevel, France and concluded on 13 April 2025 in Tromsø, Norway.

== Map of World Cup hosts ==
Europe

== Men ==
=== Calendar ===
Event key: SP – Sprint, VE - Vertical, IN – Individual
#	Date	Place	Type	Winner	Second	Third	U23 Winner	R.
1	14 December 2024	(France) Courchevel	SP	(Spain) Oriol Cardona Coll	(Switzerland) Arno Lietha	(France) Thibault Anselmet	(Switzerland) Jon Kistler	
2	15 December 2024	(France) Courchevel	VE	(Switzerland) Rémi Bonnet	(Switzerland) Aurélien Gay	(France) Xavier Gachet	(Switzerland) Thomas Bussard	
3	10 January 2025	(Azerbaijan) Şahdağ	SP	(Switzerland) Arno Lietha	(Switzerland) Robin Bussard	(Spain) Ot Ferrer Martínez	(Switzerland) Robin Bussard	
4	11 January 2025	(Azerbaijan) Şahdağ	VE	(Switzerland) Rémi Bonnet	(Austria) Christof Hochenwarter	(Belgium) Maximilien Drion	(Austria) Paul Verbnjak	
5	13 January 2025	(Azerbaijan) Şahdağ	IN	(Switzerland) Rémi Bonnet	(France) Samuel Equy	(France) Thibault Anselmet	(Austria) Paul Verbnjak	
6	25 January 2025	(Andorra) Arinsal	IN	(Switzerland) Rémi Bonnet	(France) Thibault Anselmet	(Switzerland) Aurélien Gay	(Austria) Paul Verbnjak	
7	1 February 2025	(Spain) Boí Taüll	SP	(Spain) Oriol Cardona Coll	(Switzerland) Robin Bussard	(Switzerland) Arno Lietha	(Switzerland) Robin Bussard	
8	21 February 2025	(Italy) Bormio	SP	(Spain) Oriol Cardona Coll	(Switzerland) Jon Kistler	(Switzerland) Arno Lietha	(Switzerland) Jon Kistler	
9	14 March 2025	(Austria) Schladming	VE	(Switzerland) Rémi Bonnet	(France) Thibault Anselmet	(Belgium) Maximilien Drion	(Austria) Paul Verbnjak	
10	15 March 2025	(Austria) Schladming	SP	(Spain) Oriol Cardona Coll	(France) Thibault Anselmet	(Switzerland) Jon Kistler	(Switzerland) Jon Kistler	
11	20 March 2025	(Italy) Val Martello	IN	(Switzerland) Rémi Bonnet	(France) William Bon Mardion	(Italy) Matteo Eydallin		
12	4 April 2025	(Switzerland) Villars-sur-Ollon	SP	(France) Thibault Anselmet	(Switzerland) Jon Kistler	(Belgium) Maximilien Drion		
13	10 April 2025	(Norway) Tromsø	VE	(Switzerland) Rémi Bonnet	(Belgium) Maximilien Drion	(Switzerland) Aurélien Gay		
14	12 April 2025	(Norway) Tromsø	SP	(Switzerland) Thomas Bussard	(Switzerland) Jon Kistler	(Belgium) Maximilien Drion		
15	13 April 2025	(Norway) Tromsø	IN	(Switzerland) Rémi Bonnet	(Italy) Davide Magnini	(Italy) Matteo Eydallin		

=== Standings ===
==== Overall ====
Rank	after 15 of 15 events	Points
1	(France) Thibault Anselmet	980
2	(Belgium) Maximilien Drion	896
3	(Switzerland) Rémi Bonnet	800
4	(Spain) Oriol Cardona Coll	745
5	(Austria) Paul Verbnjak	604

==== Sprint ====
Rank	after 7 of 7 events	Points
1	(Spain) Oriol Cardona Coll	575
2	(Switzerland) Jon Kistler	527
3	(France) Thibault Anselmet	518
4	(Switzerland) Arno Lietha	437
5	(Spain) Ot Ferrer Martínez	425

==== Vertical ====
Rank	after 4 of 4 events	Points
1	(Switzerland) Rémi Bonnet	400
2	(Belgium) Maximilien Drion	318
3	(Switzerland) Aurélien Gay	265
4	(Austria) Paul Verbnjak	251
5	(France) Thibault Anselmet	243

==== Individual ====
Rank	after 4 of 4 events	Points
1	(Switzerland) Rémi Bonnet	400
2	(Austria) Paul Verbnjak	229
3	(France) Xavier Gachet	225
4	(France) Samuel Equy	222
5	(Belgium) Maximilien Drion	220

==== U23 ====
Rank	after 14 of 15 events	Points
1	(Switzerland) Robin Bussard	568
2	(Switzerland) Thomas Bussard	558
3	(Switzerland) Jon Kistler	544
4	(Spain) Ot Ferrer Martínez	451
5	Nikita Filippov	417

== Women ==
=== Calendar ===
Event key: SP – Sprint, VE - Vertical, IN – Individual
#	Date	Place	Type	Winner	Second	Third	U23 Winner	R.
1	14 December 2024	(France) Courchevel	SP	(France) Emily Harrop	(Switzerland) Marianne Fatton	(France) Margot Ravinel	(France) Margot Ravinel	
2	15 December 2024	(France) Courchevel	VE	(France) Axelle Gachet Mollaret	(France) Emily Harrop	(Austria) Sarah Dreier	(Spain) Malen Osa Ansa	
3	10 January 2025	(Azerbaijan) Şahdağ	SP	(France) Emily Harrop	(Switzerland) Marianne Fatton	(France) Célia Perillat-Pessey	(Spain) Maria Ordoñez Cobacho	
4	11 January 2025	(Azerbaijan) Şahdağ	VE	(France) Axelle Gachet Mollaret	(Austria) Johanna Hiemer	(France) Emily Harrop	(China) Suolang Quzhen	
5	13 January 2025	(Azerbaijan) Şahdağ	IN	(France) Axelle Gachet Mollaret	(France) Emily Harrop	(Austria) Johanna Hiemer	(Switzerland) Thibe Deseyn	
6	25 January 2025	(Andorra) Arinsal	IN	(France) Axelle Gachet Mollaret	(France) Emily Harrop	(Sweden) Tove Alexandersson	(France) Margot Ravinel	
7	1 February 2025	(Spain) Boí Taüll	SP	(France) Emily Harrop	(France) Léna Bonnel	(Spain) Ana Alonso Rodriguez	(Switzerland) Caroline Ulrich	
8	21 February 2025	(Italy) Bormio	SP	(France) Emily Harrop	(Switzerland) Marianne Fatton	(Switzerland) Caroline Ulrich	(Switzerland) Caroline Ulrich	
9	14 March 2025	(Austria) Schladming	VE	(Sweden) Tove Alexandersson	(France) Emily Harrop	(Italy) Alba De Silvestro	(Switzerland) Thibe Deseyn	
10	15 March 2025	(Austria) Schladming	SP	(France) Emily Harrop	(Switzerland) Marianne Fatton	(Spain) Ana Alonso Rodriguez	(Switzerland) Caroline Ulrich	
11	20 March 2025	(Italy) Val Martello	IN	(France) Axelle Gachet Mollaret	(France) Emily Harrop	(Italy) Alba De Silvestro		
12	4 April 2024	(Switzerland) Villars-sur-Ollon	SP	(France) Emily Harrop	(Italy) Giulia Murada	(Italy) Katia Mascherona		
13	10 April 2025	(Norway) Tromsø	VE	(France) Axelle Gachet Mollaret	(France) Emily Harrop	(Italy) Alba De Silvestro		
14	12 April 2025	(Norway) Tromsø	SP	(France) Emily Harrop	(Switzerland) Marianne Fatton	(France) Margot Ravinel		
15	13 April 2025	(Norway) Tromsø	IN	(France) Axelle Gachet Mollaret	(France) Emily Harrop	(Italy) Alba De Silvestro		

=== Standings ===
==== Overall ====
Rank	after 13 of 15 events	Points
1	(France) Emily Harrop	1411
2	(France) Célia Perillat-Pessey	834
3	(Spain) Ana Alonso Rodriguez	809
4	(France) Axelle Gachet Mollaret	700
5	(Switzerland) Marianne Fatton	696

==== Sprint ====
Rank	after 7 of 7 events	Points
1	(France) Emily Harrop	700
2	(Switzerland) Marianne Fatton	571
3	(Spain) Ana Alonso Rodriguez	453
4	(France) Célia Perillat-Pessey	396
5	(France) Léna Bonnel	393

==== Vertical ====
Rank	after 4 of 4 events	Points
1	(France) Emily Harrop	351
2	(France) Axelle Gachet Mollaret	300
3	(Italy) Alba De Silvestro	235
4	(Spain) Ana Alonso Rodriguez	230
5	(Austria) Sarah Dreier	227

==== Individual ====
Rank	after 4 of 4 events	Points
1	(France) Axelle Gachet Mollaret	400
2	(France) Emily Harrop	360
3	(Italy) Alba De Silvestro	235
4	(France) Lorna Bonnel	228
5	(France) Célia Perillat-Pessey	219

==== U23 ====
Rank	after 8 of 16 events	Points
1	(France) Margot Ravinel	640
2	(Switzerland) Thibe Deseyn	590
3	(China) Suolang Quzhen	354
4	(Switzerland) Caroline Ulrich	344
5	(Norway) Ida Waldal	294

== Team events ==
=== Mixed Relay ===
#	Date	Place	Winner	Second	Third	R.
1	26 January 2025	(Andorra) Arinsal	Spain Ana Alonso Rodriguez; Oriol Cardona Coll	France Emily Harrop; Pablo Giner Dalmasso	Switzerland Marianne Fatton; Robin Bussard	
2	2 February 2025	(Spain) Boí Taüll	Switzerland Caroline Ulrich; Thomas Bussard	Spain Ana Alonso Rodriguez; Oriol Cardona Coll	Austria Johanna Hiemer; Paul Verbnjak	
3	23 February 2025	(Italy) Bormio	Spain Ana Alonso Rodriguez; Oriol Cardona Coll	France Emily Harrop; Thibault Anselmet	Switzerland Marianne Fatton; Robin Bussard	
4	22 March 2025	(Italy) Val Martello	Switzerland Caroline Ulrich; Thomas Bussard	Spain Ana Alonso Rodriguez; Oriol Cardona Coll	France Emily Harrop; Pablo Giner Dalmasso	
5	5 April 2025	(Switzerland) Villars-sur-Ollon	Spain Ana Alonso Rodriguez; Oriol Cardona Coll	Switzerland Marianne Fatton; Thomas Bussard	Italy Michele Boscacci; Alba De Silvestro	

== Podium table by nation ==
Table showing the World Cup podium places (gold–1st place, silver–2nd place, bronze–3rd place) by the countries represented by the athletes.

Rank	Nation	Gold	Silver	Bronze	Total
1	France	15	15	8	38
2	Switzerland	12	13	8	33
3	Spain	7	2	3	12
4	Sweden	1	0	1	2
5	Italy	0	2	8	10
6	Austria	0	2	3	5
7	Belgium	0	1	4	5
Totals (7 entries)		35	35	35	105
