= Ski mountaineering at the 2026 Winter Olympics – Qualification =

The following is about the qualification rules and the quota allocation for the ski mountaineering events at the 2026 Winter Olympics.

== Qualification rules ==
A maximum of 36 total athletes will be allowed to compete at the games, 18 male and 18 female. Each National Olympic Committee (NOC) will be able to qualify up to 2 male and 2 female competitors. A mixed relay team consists of one male and one female competitor, so a maximum of 18 mixed relay teams are possible. Results from the 2025 World Championship, and the World Cup circuit during the qualification period are used to determine the Olympic Sprint Ranking List and the Olympic Mixed Relay Ranking List.

Event	Olympic Mixed Relay Ranking List	Olympic Sprint Ranking List
ISMF Courchevel World Cup	No	Yes
ISMF Shahdag World Cup	No	Yes
ISMF Arinsal – La Massana World Cup	Yes	No
ISMF Boi Taull World Cup	Yes	Yes
ISMF Bormio World Cup MiCo2026 Test Event	Yes	Yes
2025 World Championship	Yes	Yes
ISMF Schladming World Cup	No	Yes
ISMF Val Martello World Cup	Yes	No
ISMF Villars-sur-Ollon World Cup	Yes	Yes
ISMF Tromsø World Cup	No	Yes
ISMF Solitude World Cup	Yes	Yes

To be eligible an athlete must have been in the top 80% during one of the qualifying races, or top 90% in two of them, or placed in the top 6 in an under 18 race from the Olympic Qualification period.

If a NOC fails to confirm or declines their quota, all reallocation of quotas (except for the host) will be gender specific and come from the Olympic Sprint Ranking List. If the host (Italy) does not use their quota, the next best ranked European nation listed on the Olympic Mixed Relay List that did not achieve a quota from the World Championship mixed relay race, will receive that quota.

== Allocation of quotas ==
Host

First, the host will receive one male and one female quota.

ISMF World Championships 2025 – Mixed Relay

Second, the top two ranked teams (excluding the host Italy) from the championships will receive one male and one female quota each.

Continental quota

Third, the best ranked NOC from each continent (Africa, Asia, Oceania, Europe, Americas) not already receiving a quota, receive one male and one female quota.

Olympic Mixed Relay Ranking List

Fourth, from the above named list each NOC who has not already received a quota receives both a male and a female quota, until there are twelve NOCs listed.

ISMF World Championships 2025 – Sprint

Fifth, the top two male and female competitors from the individual sprint races will achieve a quota for their NOC. If the NOC already would go over two quotas in either gender then the quota will be passed on to the next NOC in the applicable race.

Olympic Sprint Ranking List

The final four men's and women's quotas go to the highest ranked NOCs on this list, providing that no NOC may exceed two quotas per gender.

== Quota allocation ==
NOC's with quotas are assured of Olympic participation. However, provisional standings are not assured and can continue to change up until 21 December 2025.

As of Solitude World Cup (7 December 2025)

=== Summary ===
Nations	Men's Quotas	Women's Quotas	Athletes
Australia	1	1	2
Austria	1	1	2
Belgium	1	0	1
China	1	1	2
France	2	2	4
Germany	1	2	3
Individual Neutral Athletes	1	0	1
Italy	1	2	3
Norway	2	1	3
Poland	1	1	2
Slovakia	1	2	3
Spain	2	2	4
Switzerland	2	2	4
United States	1	1	2
Total: 14 NOCs	18	18	36

=== Breakdown ===
Rankings from the applicable list or competition appear in parentheses.

Event			Places	Nation	
Qualification through the Mixed Relay pathway
Host			1	Italy	
2025 ISMF World Championship			2	France; Spain	
Olympic Mixed Relay Ranking List	Continental quota	Africa	0	—N/a	
Olympic Mixed Relay Ranking List	Continental quota	Americas	1	United States	
Olympic Mixed Relay Ranking List	Continental quota	Asia	1	China	
Olympic Mixed Relay Ranking List	Continental quota	Oceania	1	Australia	
Olympic Mixed Relay Ranking List	Remaining quotas		6	Switzerland; Austria; Germany; Norway; Slovakia; Poland	
Total			12		
Qualification through the Sprint pathway				Men's	Women's
2025 ISMF World Championship			2	Spain; France	Switzerland; France
Olympic Sprint Ranking List			4	Switzerland; Belgium; Individual Neutral Athletes; Norway	Spain; Italy; Germany; Slovakia
Total			6	6	6
Total			18		

=== Olympic Mixed Relay Ranking List and Olympic Sprint Ranking List ===
Key
Nation qualified from another pathway
Nation qualified through the ranking list

Standings after the Solitude World Cup

Mixed Relay standings
Rank	Nation	Continent	Points
1	Spain	Europe	570
2	Switzerland	Europe	533
3	France	Europe	494
4	Austria	Europe	446
5	Italy	Europe	417
6	Germany	Europe	382
7	Norway	Europe	342
8	China	Asia	329
9	United States	Americas	329
10	Slovakia	Europe	305
11	Poland	Europe	303
12	Sweden	Europe	298
13	Canada	Americas	290
14	Slovenia	Europe	245
15	Japan	Asia	232
16	Andorra	Europe	216
17	Great Britain	Europe	210
18	Romania	Europe	191
19	Azerbaijan	Europe	191
20	Greece	Europe	189
21	Netherlands	Europe	177
22	Czech Republic	Europe	138
23	Australia	Oceania	125
24	Bulgaria	Europe	120
25	Chile	Americas	80

Standings after Solitude World Cup. Only the top ten who are eligible to qualify through this path are shown.

Men's standings
Rank	Nation	Name	Points
1	Switzerland	Jon Kistler	605
2	Belgium	Maximilien Drion	459
3	Individual Neutral Athletes	Nikita Filippov	331
4	Norway	Hans-Inge Klette	282
5	Italy	Rocco Baldini	261
6	Austria	Andreas Mayer	240
7	Germany	Finn Hösch	222
8	Andorra	Oriol Olm Rouppert	200
9	Japan	Tokutaro Shima	137
10	China	Zhang Chenghao	137

Women's standings
Rank	Nation	Name	Points
1	Spain	Ana Alonso Rodriguez	498
2	Italy	Giulia Murada	468
3	Germany	Tatjana Paller	429
4	Slovakia	Marianna Jagerčíková	360
5	Czech Republic	Eva Matějovičová	300
6	Canada	Emma Cook-Clarke	298
7	Poland	Iwona Januszyk	292
8	Austria	Johanna Hiemer	290
9	Norway	Ida Waldal	270
10	China	Suolang Quzhen	258
