= Ski mountaineering at the 2026 Winter Olympics – Mixed relay =

Mixed relay at the XXV Olympic Winter Games
- Venue: Stelvio, Bormio
- Date: 21 February
- Competitors: 24 from 12 nations
- Winning time: 26:57.44

Medalists
1st place, gold medalist(s)		Emily Harrop; Thibault Anselmet	France
2nd place, silver medalist(s)		Marianne Fatton; Jon Kistler	Switzerland
3rd place, bronze medalist(s)		Ana Alonso; Oriol Cardona	Spain

The mixed relay competition in ski mountaineering at the 2026 Winter Olympics was held on 21 February at the Stelvio Ski Centre in Bormio, Italy. The event made its Olympic debut. The event was won by reigning world champions Emily Harrop and Thibault Anselmet of France, with Switzerland (Marianne Fatton and Jon Kistler) and Spain (Ana Alonso and Oriol Cardona) finishing second and third, respectively. Kistler won his first Olympic medal, while the other recipients had previously won medals during the individual events earlier in the games.

== Background ==
At the 2025–26 ISMF Ski Mountaineering World Cup, only two mixed relay events were held before the Olympics. Cameron Smith and Anna Gibson of the United States and Thibault Anselmet and Emily Harrop of France won once each. The 2025 World champions were Anselmet and Harrop.

== Results ==
=== Final ===
Rank	Bib	Country	Time	Deficit	Penalty
1st place, gold medalist(s)	3	France; Emily Harrop; Thibault Anselmet	26:57.44		
2nd place, silver medalist(s)	2	Switzerland; Marianne Fatton; Jon Kistler	27:09.30	+11.86	
3rd place, bronze medalist(s)	1	Spain; Ana Alonso; Oriol Cardona	27:23.94	+26.50	+0:03
4	9	United States; Anna Gibson; Cameron Smith	27:40.43	+42.99	
5	5	Italy; Alba De Silvestro; Michele Boscacci	27:57.64	+1:00.20	
6	4	Austria; Johanna Hiemer; Paul Verbnjak	28:05.12	+1:07.68	
7	6	Germany; Tatjana Paller; Finn Hösch	28:39.48	+1:42.04	
8	8	China; Cidan Yuzhen; Bu Luer	29:21.66	+2:24.22	
9	11	Poland; Iwona Januszyk; Jan Elantkowski	29:38.43	+2:40.99	
10	7	Norway; Ida Waldal; Hans-Inge Klette	30:11.33	+3:13.89	+0:03
11	10	Slovakia; Marianna Jagerčíková; Jakub Šiarnik	30:36.23	+3:38.79	
12	12	Australia; Lara Hamilton; Phillip Bellingham	32:33.45	+5:36.01	+0:06
