= Ski mountaineering at the 2026 Winter Olympics =

Ski mountaineering at the XXV Olympic Winter Games
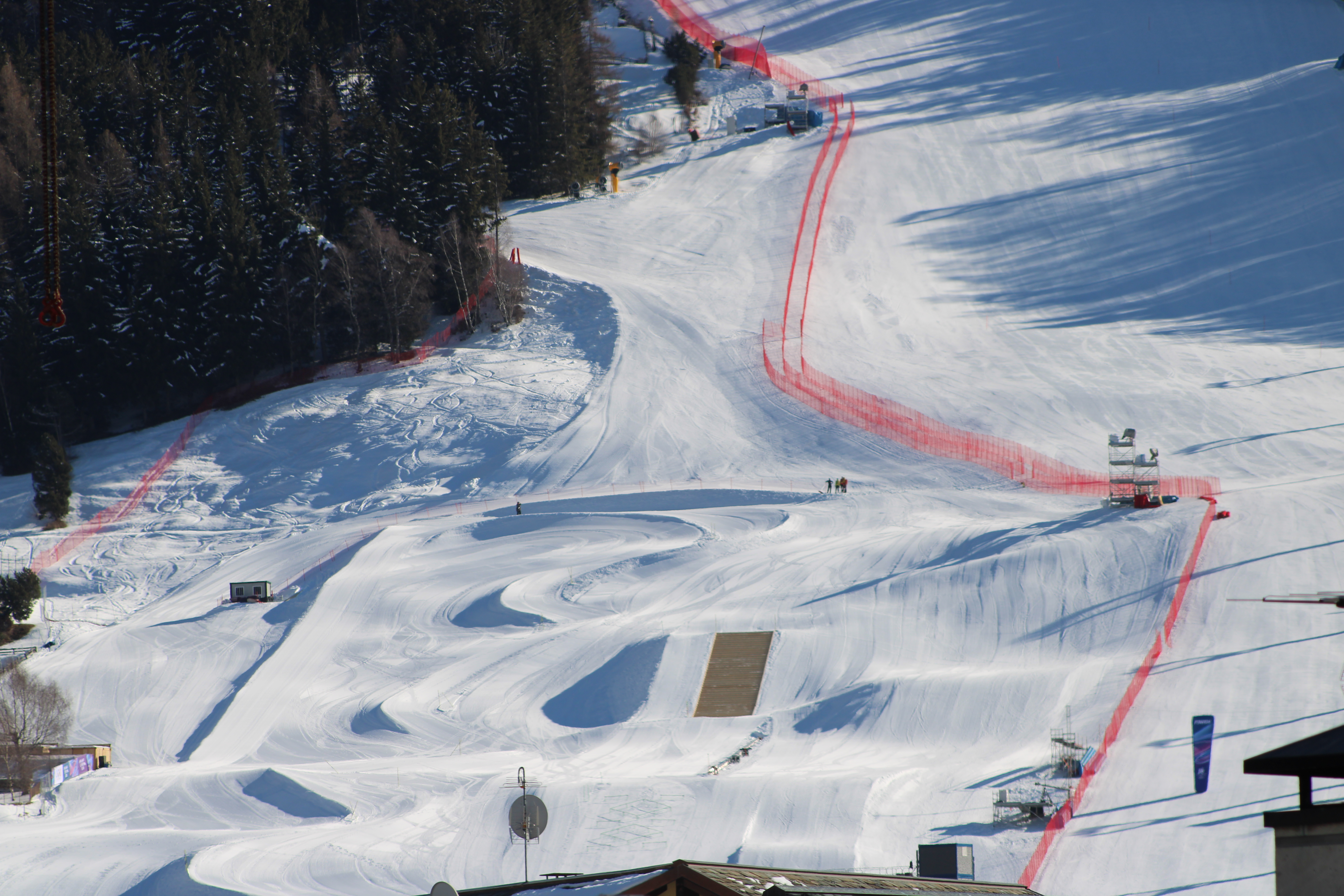
- Venue: Stelvio Ski Centre, Bormio
- Dates: 19, 21 February 2026
- No. of events: 3 (1 men, 1 women, 1 mixed)

Ski mountaineering at the 2026 Winter Olympics was held at the Stelvio Ski Centre in Bormio, Italy. It was the first appearance of the sport at the Olympics. The events took place on 19 February (sprint) and 21 February 2026 (team relay). A total of three ski mountaineering events were held.

== Competition schedule ==
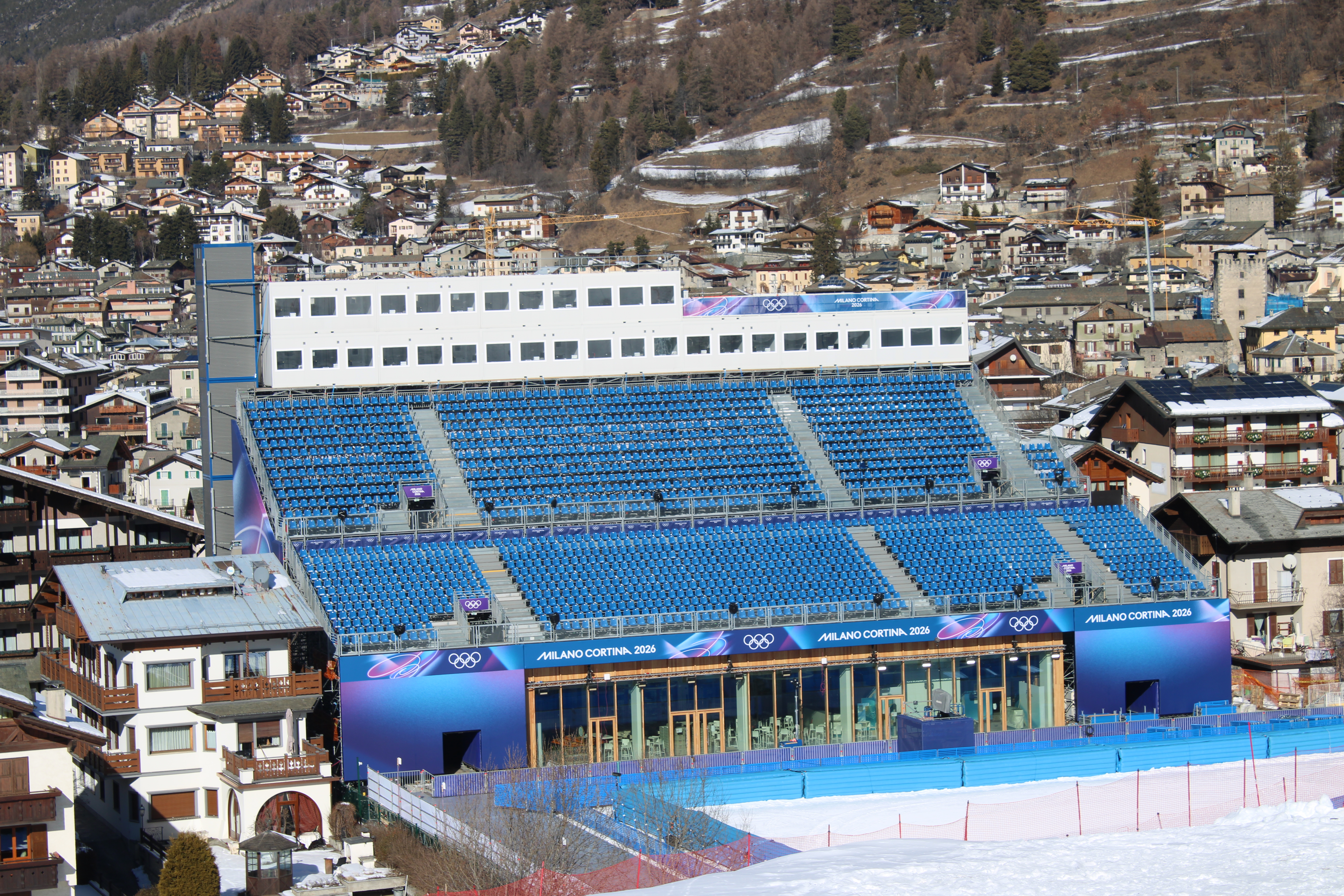
Stelvio Ski Centre in Bormio

The following is the competition schedule for the three ski mountaineering events.

All times are (UTC+1).

Date	Time	Event
19 February	09:50	Men's and women's sprint
21 February	13:30	Mixed relay

== Medal summary ==
=== Medal table ===
Rank	Nation	Gold	Silver	Bronze	Total
1	France	1	1	1	3
2	Switzerland	1	1	0	2
3	Spain	1	0	2	3
–	Individual Neutral Athletes	0	1	0	1
Totals (3 entries)		3	3	3	9

=== Medalists ===
Event	Gold		Silver		Bronze	
Men's	Oriol Cardona; Spain	2:34.03	Nikita Filippov; Individual Neutral Athletes	2:35.55	Thibault Anselmet; France	2:36.34
Women's	Marianne Fatton; Switzerland	2:59.77	Emily Harrop; France	3:02.15	Ana Alonso; Spain	3:10.22
Mixed team	France; Emily Harrop; Thibault Anselmet	26:57.44	Switzerland; Marianne Fatton; Jon Kistler	27:09.30	Spain; Ana Alonso; Oriol Cardona	27:23.94

== Participating nations ==
Athletes representing 13 different nations qualified to compete in the debut ski mountaineering events. One Individual Neutral Athlete also qualified.
