= Ski mountaineering at the 2026 Winter Olympics – Women's sprint =

Women's sprint at the XXV Olympic Winter Games
- Venue: Stelvio, Bormio
- Date: 19 February
- Competitors: 18 from 12 nations
- Winning time: 2:59.77

Medalists
1st place, gold medalist(s)		Marianne Fatton	Switzerland
2nd place, silver medalist(s)		Emily Harrop	France
3rd place, bronze medalist(s)		Ana Alonso	Spain

The women's sprint competition in ski mountaineering at the 2026 Winter Olympics was held on 19 February at the Stelvio Ski Centre in Bormio, Italy. The event made its Olympic debut. Marianne Fatton of Switzerland won the event, Emily Harrop of France won the silver medal, and Ana Alonso of Spain bronze.

== Background ==
At the 2025–26 ISMF Ski Mountaineering World Cup, only three sprint events were held before the Olympics. Emily Harrop won twice and Margot Ravinel won once. The 2025 World champion was Marianne Fatton.

Ski mountaineering consists of skiing uphill with "skins" on the bottom of the ski; these are carpet-like coverings that provide grip to the skier. The athletes then remove their skis and place them in their backpack, before climbing a rise on foot. They then return to their skis to finish their climb. Once they reach the ascent, they remove the skins and ski downhill to the finish line.

== Results ==
=== Heats ===
Top 3 in each heat and the fastest 3 (LL) overall qualify to the semifinals.

Heat 1

Rank	Bib	Athlete	Country	Time	Deficit	Note
1	1	Emily Harrop	France	3:03.34		Q
2	6	Tatjana Paller	Germany	3:11.20	+7.86	Q
3	7	Caroline Ulrich	Switzerland	3:11.43	+8.09	Q
4	12	Ida Waldal	Norway	3:15.36	+12.02	LL
5	18	Anna Gibson	United States	3:17.44	+14.10	LL
6	13	Rebeka Cully	Slovakia	3:31.24	+27.90	

Heat 2

Rank	Bib	Athlete	Country	Time	Deficit	Note
1	2	Marianne Fatton	Switzerland	3:06.51		Q
2	5	Margot Ravinel	France	3:07.84	+1.33	Q
3	8	Marianna Jagerčíková	Slovakia	3:15.32	+8.81	Q
4	14	Alba De Silvestro	Italy	3:15.48	+8.97	LL
5	11	Johanna Hiemer	Austria	3:19.98	+13.47	
6	17	Lara Hamilton	Australia	3:39.25	+32.74	

Heat 3

Rank	Bib	Athlete	Country	Time	Deficit	Note
1	4	Giulia Murada	Italy	3:17.63		Q
2	3	Ana Alonso	Spain	3:18.28	+0.65	Q
3	9	María Costa	Spain	3:26.75	+9.12	Q
4	15	Cidan Yuzhen	China	3:27.40	+9.77	
5	16	Helena Euringer	Germany	3:27.82	+10.19	
6	10	Iwona Januszyk	Poland	3:34.88	+17.25	

=== Semifinals ===
Top 2 in each semifinal and the fastest 2 (LL) overall qualify to the final.

Semifinal 1

Rank	Bib	Athlete	Country	Time	Deficit	Note
1	1	Emily Harrop	France	3:06.57		Q
2	2	Marianne Fatton	Switzerland	3:08.29	+1.72	Q
3	3	Ana Alonso	Spain	3:09.19	+2.62	LL
4	12	Ida Waldal	Norway	3:15.28	+8.71	
5	18	Anna Gibson	United States	3:15.69	+9.12	
6	9	María Costa	Spain	3:38.00	+31.43	

Semifinal 2

Rank	Bib	Athlete	Country	Time	Deficit	Note
1	5	Margot Ravinel	France	3:10.13		Q
2	6	Tatjana Paller	Germany	3:12.09	+1.96	Q
3	4	Giulia Murada	Italy	3:12.43	+2.30	LL
4	7	Caroline Ulrich	Switzerland	3:14.71	+4.58	
5	14	Alba De Silvestro	Italy	3:17.01	+6.88	
6	8	Marianna Jagerčíková	Slovakia	3:26.80	+16.67	

=== Final ===
Rank	Bib	Athlete	Country	Time	Deficit	Note
1st place, gold medalist(s)	2	Marianne Fatton	Switzerland	2:59.77		
2nd place, silver medalist(s)	1	Emily Harrop	France	3:02.15	+2.38	
3rd place, bronze medalist(s)	3	Ana Alonso	Spain	3:10.22	+10.45	
4	6	Tatjana Paller	Germany	3:13.26	+13.49	
5	4	Giulia Murada	Italy	3:15.46	+15.69	
6	5	Margot Ravinel	France	3:18.27	+18.50	
