= Spain at the 2026 Winter Olympics =

- IOC code: ESP
- NOC: Spanish Olympic Committee
- Website: www.coe.es (in Spanish)

in Milan and Cortina d'Ampezzo, Italy 6 February 2026 – 22 February 2026
- Competitors: 20 (13 men and 7 women) in 6 sports
- Flag bearers (opening): Joaquim Salarich & Olivia Smart
- Flag bearers (closing): Oriol Cardona & Ana Alonso
- Medals Ranked 18th: Gold 1 Silver 0 Bronze 2 Total 3

Winter Olympics appearances (overview)
- 1936; 1948; 1952; 1956; 1960; 1964; 1968; 1972; 1976; 1980; 1984; 1988; 1992; 1994; 1998; 2002; 2006; 2010; 2014; 2018; 2022; 2026

Spain competed at the 2026 Winter Olympics in Milan and Cortina d'Ampezzo, Italy, from 6 to 22 February 2026.

Alpine skier Joaquim Salarich and figure skater Olivia Smart were the country's flagbearer during the opening ceremony. Meanwhile, Oriol Cardona & Ana Alonso were the country's flagbearer during the closing ceremony.

Oriol Cardona became the first Spaniard to win a Winter Olympics gold medal since the 1972 Sapporo games.

With 3 medals, this became Spain’s all-time best result in amount of total and amount of bronzes. (Note: Spain originally won three gold medals at the 2002 Winter Olympics through Johann Mühlegg, but they were all stripped after he failed a doping test.)

== Medalists ==
Shown in these charts are the Spanish athletes who won medals at the 2026 Winter Olympic games as of February 19, 2026.

Medal	Name	Sport	Event	Date
Gold	Oriol Cardona	Ski mountaineering	Men's sprint	19 February
Bronze	Ana Alonso	Ski mountaineering	Women's sprint	19 February
Bronze	Oriol Cardona; Ana Alonso	Ski mountaineering	Mixed relay	21 February

Medals by date
Day	Date	1st place, gold medalist(s)	2nd place, silver medalist(s)	3rd place, bronze medalist(s)	Total
13	19 February	1	0	1	2
15	21 February	0	0	1	1
Total		1	0	2	3

Medals by sport
Sport	1st place, gold medalist(s)	2nd place, silver medalist(s)	3rd place, bronze medalist(s)	Total
Ski mountaineering	1	0	2	3
Total	1	0	2	3

Medals by gender
Gender	1st place, gold medalist(s)	2nd place, silver medalist(s)	3rd place, bronze medalist(s)	Total
Male	1	0	0	1
Female	0	0	1	1
Mixed	0	0	1	1
Total	1	0	2	3

Multiple medalists
Name	Sport	1st place, gold medalist(s)	2nd place, silver medalist(s)	3rd place, bronze medalist(s)	Total
Oriol Cardona	Ski mountaineering	1	0	1	2
Ana Alonso	Ski mountaineering	0	0	2	2

== Competitors ==
The following is the list of number of competitors participating at the Games per sport/discipline.

Sport	Men	Women	Total
Alpine skiing	1	1	2
Cross-country skiing	3	0	3
Figure skating	3	2	5
Ski mountaineering	2	2	4
Snowboarding	2	2	4
Speed skating	2	0	2
Total	13	7	20

== Alpine skiing ==
Spain qualified one female and one male alpine skier through the basic quota.

Athlete	Event	Run 1		Run 2		Total	
Athlete	Event	Time	Rank	Time	Rank	Time	Rank
Joaquim Salarich	Men's slalom	1:00.32	21	57.86	15	1:58.18	19
Arrieta Rodríguez	Women's slalom	51.19	39	55.64	32	1:46.83	33

== Cross-country skiing ==
Spain qualified one male cross-country skier through the basic quota. Following the completion of the 2024–25 FIS Cross-Country World Cup, Spain qualified a further two male athletes.

Distance

Athlete	Event	Final		
Athlete	Event	Time	Deficit	Rank
Bernat Sellés	Men's 10 km freestyle	DSQ		

Sprint

Athlete	Event	Qualification		Quarterfinal		Semifinal		Final	
Athlete	Event	Time	Rank	Time	Rank	Time	Rank	Time	Rank
Marc Colell	Men's sprint	3:27.49	55	Did not advance					
Jaume Pueyo	Men's sprint	3:15.81	13 Q	3:40.44	6	Did not advance			
Bernat Sellés	Men's sprint	3:18.56	29 Q	3:41.76	6	Did not advance			
Marc Colell; Jaume Pueyo	Men's team sprint	5:52.21	5 Q	—N/a				19:06.33	15

== Figure skating ==
In the 2025 World Figure Skating Championships in Boston, the United States, Spain secured one quota in each of the men's singles, and one quota in each of the ice dance. Spain earned one quota in ice dance at the ISU Skate to Milano Figure Skating Qualifier 2025 in Beijing, China.

Athlete	Event	SP/SD		FP/FD		Total	
Athlete	Event	Points	Rank	Points	Rank	Points	Rank
Tomàs-Llorenç Guarino Sabaté	Men's singles	69.80	25	Did not advance			
Olivia Smart; Tim Dieck	Ice dance	78.53	10 Q	122.96	6	201.49 NR	9
Sofía Val; Asaf Kazimov	Ice dance	64.98	20 Q	100.25	19	165.23	19

== Ski mountaineering ==
Spain qualified two female and two male ski mountaineer through the 2025 ISMF World Championships.

Athlete	Event	Heat		Semifinal		Final	
Athlete	Event	Time	Rank	Time	Rank	Time	Rank
Oriol Cardona Coll	Men's sprint	2:37.96	1 Q	2:36.10	2 Q	2:34.03	1st place, gold medalist(s)
Ot Ferrer	Men's sprint	2:41.32	2 Q	2:37.27	3 Q	2:54.45	5
Ana Alonso Rodriguez	Women's sprint	3:18.28	2 Q	3:09.20	3 Q	3:10.22	3rd place, bronze medalist(s)
Maria Costa Díez	Women's sprint	3:26.75	3 Q	3:38.00	6	Did not advance	
Oriol Cardona Coll; Ana Alonso Rodriguez	Mixed relay	—N/a				27:23.9	3rd place, bronze medalist(s)

== Snowboarding ==
Cross

Athlete	Event	Seeding		1/8 final	Quarterfinal	Semifinal	Final	
Athlete	Event	Time	Rank	Position	Position	Position	Position	Rank
Lucas Eguibar	Men's	1:08.97	12	2 Q	3	Did not advance		
Álvaro Romero	Men's	1:09.93	28	3	Did not advance			

Park & Pipe

Athlete	Event	Qualification					Final				
Athlete	Event	Run 1	Run 2	Run 3	Best	Rank	Run 1	Run 2	Run 3	Best	Rank
Queralt Castellet	Women's halfpipe	78.75	81.00	—N/a	81.00	7 Q	4.75	24.00	33.50	33.50	10
Nora Cornell	Women's big air	59.25	50.75	DNI	110	26	Did not advance				
Nora Cornell	Women's slopestyle	23.98	53.03	—N/a	53.03	19	Did not advance				

== Speed skating ==
Spain qualified two male speed skaters through performances at the 2025-26 ISU Speed Skating World Cup.

Athlete	Event	Race	
Athlete	Event	Time	Rank
Nil Llop	Men's 500 m	34.86	20
Daniel Milagros	Men's 1000 m	1:11.25	27

== See also ==
- Spain at the 2026 Winter Paralympics
