= 2023 World Championship of Ski Mountaineering =

Ski competition

- Host city: Boí Taüll
- Country: Spain
- Nations: 27
- Athletes: 227
- Events: 28
- Opening: 28 February 2023
- Closing: 5 March 2023

The 2023 World Championship of Ski Mountaineering was held in Boí Taüll, Catalonia, Spain, from 28 February 28 to 5 March 2023. It was the twelfth edition of the event.

== Medal summary ==
=== Medal table ===
* Host nation (Spain)

Rank	Nation	Gold	Silver	Bronze	Total
1	France	9	3	6	18
2	Switzerland	6	9	3	18
3	Italy	4	9	12	25
4	China	3	0	0	3
5	Spain*	2	3	3	8
6	Austria	1	2	4	7
7	United States	1	1	1	3
8	Belgium	1	1	0	2
9	Andorra	1	0	1	2
10	Germany	1	0	0	1
10	Slovakia	1	0	0	1
12	Czech Republic	0	1	0	1
12	Romania	0	1	0	1
Totals (13 entries)		30	30	30	90

=== Senior ===
==== Men ====
Event	Gold		Silver		Bronze	
Sprint Race	Oriol Cardona Coll; Spain	2:35.218	Thibault Anselmet; France	2:41.881	Robin Galindo; France	2:46.811
Vertical Race	Rémi Bonnet; Switzerland	21:54.7	Maximilien Drion du Chapois; Belgium	22:54.9	Gedeon Pochat Cottilloux; France	23:05.2
Individual Race	Rémi Bonnet; Switzerland	1:20:20.7	Matteo Eydallin; Italy	1:22:11.9	Robert Antonioli; Italy	1:22:49.5
Team Race	Robert Antonioli; Matteo Eydallin; Italy	1:56:28.7	William Bon Mardion; Xavier Gachet; France	1:57:20.6	Davide Magnini; Nadir Maguet; Italy	2:00:21.0

==== Women ====
Event	Gold		Silver		Bronze	
Sprint Race	Marianna Jagerčíková; Slovakia	3:11.034	Marianne Fatton; Switzerland	3:14.005	Emily Harrop; France	3:16.248
Vertical Race	Axelle Gachet Mollaret; France	26:22.9	Sarah Dreier; Austria	26:55.9	Alba de Silvestro; Italy	27:22.2
Individual Race	Axelle Gachet Mollaret; France	1:17:05.9	Alba de Silvestro; Italy	1:20:13.6	Giulia Murada; Italy	1:20:55.5
Team Race	Axelle Gachet Mollaret; Emily Harrop; France	2:12:48.9	Giulia Murada; Alba de Silvestro; Italy	2:15:53.4	Célia Perillat Pessey; Candice Bonnel; France	2:17:48.8

==== Mixed ====
Event	Gold		Silver		Bronze	
Relay	Emily Harrop; Thibault Anselmet; France	26:46.5	Giulia Murada; Nicolò Ernesto Canclini; Italy	26:56.8	Axelle Gachet Mollaret; Robin Galindo; France	26:58.8

=== Under-23 ===
==== Men ====
Event	Gold		Silver		Bronze	
Sprint Race	Robin Galindo; France	2:46.811 (F)	Matteo Favre; Switzerland	2:49.892 (F)	Ot Martinez Ferrer; Spain	2:49.915 (SF)
Vertical Race	Anselme Damevin; France	23:16.8	Thomas Bussard; Switzerland	23:32.7	Paul Verbnjak; Austria	23:40.6
Individual Race	Anselme Damevin; France	1:24:38.9	Thomas Bussard; Switzerland	1:26:21.0	Paul Verbnjak; Austria	1:26:48.7

==== Women ====
Event	Gold		Silver		Bronze	
Sprint Race	Caroline Ulrich; Switzerland	3:18.205 (SF)	Katia Mascherona; Italy	3:40.767 (SF)	Maria Costa; Spain	3:50.621 (SF)
Vertical Race	Katia Mascherona; Italy	29:28.1	Lisa Moreschini; Italy	29:36.0	Caroline Ulrich; Switzerland	29:57.1
Individual Race	Caroline Ulrich; Switzerland	1:23:26.2	Katia Mascherona; Italy	1:26:08.2	Samantha Bertolina; Italy	1:27:14.5

=== Under-20 ===
==== Men ====
Event	Gold		Silver		Bronze	
Sprint Race	Finn Hösch; Germany	2:48.122	Jon Kistler; Switzerland	2:53.539	Jérémy Anselmet; France	2:57.865
Vertical Race	Oriol Olm Rouppert; Andorra	24:46.5	Loïc Dubois; Switzerland	24:58.4	Julian Tristscher; Austria	25:00.5
Individual Race	Nils Oberauer; Andorra	1:09:11.6	Gheorghe-Petrut Jinga; Romania	1:09:47.4	Davide Sambrizzi; Italy	1:09:58.9

==== Women ====
Event	Gold		Silver		Bronze	
Sprint Race	Lamu Yuzhen; China	3:31.695	Maria Ordoñez Cobacho; Spain	3:34.376	Thibe Deseyn; Switzerland	3:35.165
Vertical Race	Thibe Deeyn; Switzerland	29:30.3	Louise Trincaz; France	29:45.2	Noemi Junod; Italy	30:06.2
Individual Race	Louise Trincaz; France	1:04:24.0	Noemi Junod; Italy	1:05:18.9	Thibe Deseyn; Switzerland	1:05:54.9

=== Under-18 ===
==== Men ====
Event	Gold		Silver		Bronze	
Sprint Race	Erik Canovi; Italy	2:59.590	Mathieu Pharisa; Switzerland	3:04.990	Griffin Briley; United States	3:05.824
Vertical Race	Erik Canovi; Italy	25:10.1	Griffin Briley; United States	25:40.9	Silvano Wolf; Austria	26:09.8
Individual Race	Griffin Briley; United States	54:44.4	Silvano Wolf; Austria	56:05.8	Erik Canovi; Italy	56:09.1

==== Women ====
Event	Gold		Silver		Bronze	
Sprint Race	Laia Selles Sanchez; Spain	3:40.915	Eva Matejovicova; Czech Republic	4:05.993	Melissa Bertolina; Italy	4:09.264
Vertical Race	Yuzhen Cidan; China	31:19.6	Laia Selles Sanchez; Spain	32:18.9	Alba Fernandez Campos; Spain	33:19.1
Individual Race	Yuzhen Cidan; China	1:05:48.1	Laia Selles Sanchez; Spain	1:08:23.1	Melissa Bertolina; Italy	1:11:52.8

=== Youth Mixed ===
Event	Gold		Silver		Bronze	
Relay	Thibe Deseyn; Jon Kistler; Switzerland	29:45.9	Louise Trincaz; Jérémy Anselmet; France	30:33.9	Lea Ancion Havet; Tomeu Comellas Pagès; Andorra	30:56.8
