= Ski mountaineering at the 2020 Winter Youth Olympics – Boys' individual =

Boys' individual at the III Winter Youth Olympic Games
- Venue: Villars Winter Park
- Date: 10 January
- Competitors: 24 from 16 nations
- Winning time: 47:49.85

Medalists
| 1st place, gold medalist(s) | | Thomas Bussard | Switzerland |
| 2nd place, silver medalist(s) | | Robin Bussard | Switzerland |
| 3rd place, bronze medalist(s) | | Nils Oberauer | Austria |

The boys' individual ski mountaineering competition at the 2020 Winter Youth Olympics was held on 10 January at the Villars Winter Park. The race was contested over 2 laps on a 3.6 km course, making the total distance 7.2 km.

== Results ==
The race was started at 12:30.

| Rank | Bib | Name | Country | Time | Deficit |
|---|---|---|---|---|---|
| 1st place, gold medalist(s) | 1 | Thomas Bussard | Switzerland | 47:49.85 | |
| 2nd place, silver medalist(s) | 2 | Robin Bussard | Switzerland | 49:16.54 | +1:26.69 |
| 3rd place, bronze medalist(s) | 9 | Nils Oberauer | Austria | 49:25.65 | +1:35.80 |
| 4 | 3 | Rocco Baldini | Italy | 49:38.16 | +1:48.31 |
| 5 | 4 | Ot Ferrer | Spain | 50:45.49 | +2:55.64 |
| 6 | 21 | Trym Dalset Lødøen | Norway | 50:58.23 | +3:08.38 |
| 7 | 7 | Julian Tritscher | Austria | 51:03.61 | +3:13.76 |
| 8 | 6 | Luca Tomasoni | Italy | 51:22.89 | +3:33.04 |
| 9 | 8 | Finn Hösch | Germany | 51:48.48 | +3:58.63 |
| 10 | 10 | Anselme Damevin | France | 52:23.10 | +4:33.25 |
| 11 | 14 | Nikita Philippov | Russia | 53:16.09 | +5:26.24 |
| 12 | 16 | George Beck | United States | 53:51.21 | +6:01.36 |
| 13 | 12 | Bazil Ducouret | France | 54:03.20 | +6:13.35 |
| 14 | 13 | Constantin Surdu | Romania | 55:56.52 | +8:06.67 |
| 15 | 17 | Liang Qifan | China | 56:35.07 | +8:45.22 |
| 16 | 18 | Matúš Černek | Slovakia | 56:55.86 | +9:06.01 |
| 17 | 23 | Jeremiah Vaille | United States | 56:58.99 | +9:09.14 |
| 18 | 11 | Marc Ràdua | Spain | 57:45.55 | +9:55.70 |
| 19 | 19 | Franz Eder | Germany | 58:19.32 | +10:29.47 |
| 20 | 20 | Ali Kalhor | Iran | 1:00:23.88 | +12:34.03 |
| 21 | 24 | Findlay Eyre | Canada | 1:00:32.98 | +12:43.13 |
| 22 | 15 | George Petruţ Cotinghiu | Romania | 1:05:57.53 | +18:07.68 |
| 23 | 22 | Kim Min-jun | South Korea | 1:32:33.23 | +44:43.38 |
| | 5 | Oriol Olm | Andorra | Did not finish | |
