= Paul Verbnjak =

Austrian ski mountaineer (born 2001)

Personal information
- Born: 10 December 2001 (age 24) Klagenfurt, Austria
- Height: 1.91 m (6 ft 3 in)
- Weight: 75 kg (165 lb)

Sport
- Country: Austria
- Sport: Ski mountaineering

Paul Verbnjak (born 10 December 2001) is an Austrian ski mountaineer. He will represent Austria at the 2026 Winter Olympics.

== Career ==
Verbnjak competed at the 2021 World Championships of Ski Mountaineering and won a gold medal in the under-20 vertical race. He then competed at the 2023 World Championship of Ski Mountaineering and won bronze medals in the under-23 vertical race and individual races.

During the 2024–25 ISMF Ski Mountaineering World Cup, he finished second in the individual standings. In addition to ski mountaineering, he was a professional cyclist for Lidl–Trek Future Racing in 2025.

During the 2025–26 ISMF Ski Mountaineering World Cup, he finished in second in the vertical race on 25 January 2026. In January 2026, he was selected to represent Austria at the 2026 Winter Olympics. He will compete in the sprint and mixed relay, along with Johanna Hiemer.

== Personal life ==
Verbnjak's father, Heinz, is a former ski mountaineer.
