= Ski mountaineering at the 2020 Winter Youth Olympics – Mixed relay =

Mixed relay at the III Winter Youth Olympic Games
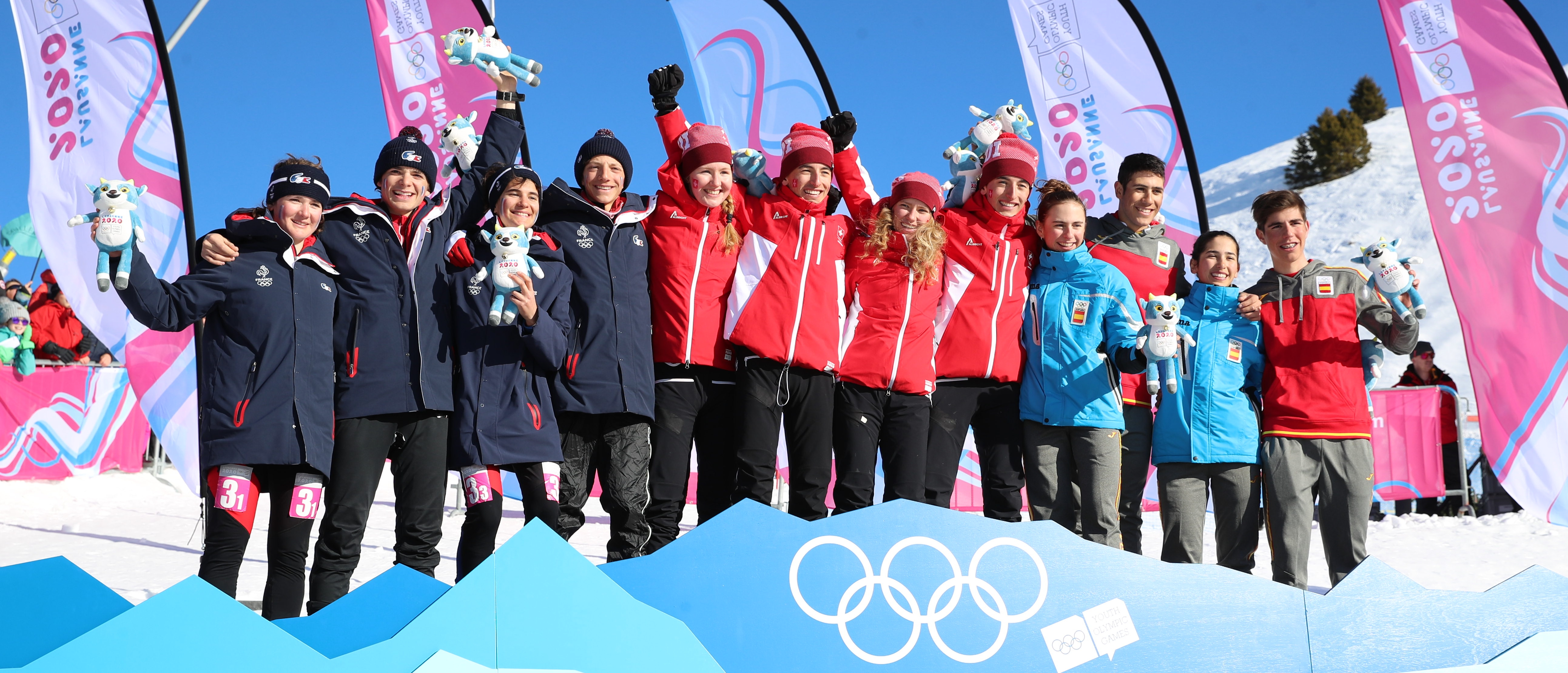
- Venue: Villars Winter Park
- Date: 14 January
- Competitors: 44 from 15 nations
- Teams: 11
- Winning time: 35:07

Medalists
1st place, gold medalist(s)		Caroline Ulrich; Thomas Bussard; Thibe Deseyn; Robin Bussard	Switzerland
2nd place, silver medalist(s)		Victoire Berger; Bazil Ducouret; Margot Ravinel; Anselme Damevin	France
3rd place, bronze medalist(s)		Maria Costa Díez; Marc Ràdua; Ares Torra Gendrau; Ot Ferrer	Spain

The mixed relay ski mountaineering competition at the 2020 Winter Youth Olympics was held on 14 January at the Villars Winter Park.

== Results ==
The race was started at 10:30.

Rank	Bib	Team	Time	Deficit
1st place, gold medalist(s)	1	Switzerland; Caroline Ulrich; Thomas Bussard; Thibe Deseyn; Robin Bussard	35:07	
2nd place, silver medalist(s)	3	France; Victoire Berger; Bazil Ducouret; Margot Ravinel; Anselme Damevin	37:11	+2:03
3rd place, bronze medalist(s)	4	Spain; Maria Costa Díez; Marc Ràdua; Ares Torra Gendrau; Ot Ferrer	37:13	+2:05
4	2	Italy; Silvia Berra; Luca Tomasoni; Erika Sanelli; Rocco Baldini	37:31	+2:23
5	8	Germany; Antonia Niedermaier; Franz Eder; Sophia Wessling; Finn Hösch	39:04	+3:56
6	7	United States; Grace Staberg; Jeremiah Vaille; Samantha Paisley; George Beck	39:07	+3:59
7	12	World 2 Yu Jingxuan; Liang Qifan; Suolang Quzhen; Oriol Olm	39:20	+4:12
8	5	Austria; Lisa Rettensteiner; Nils Oberauer; Lena Leitner-Hölzl; Julian Tritscher	40:35	+5:27
9	10	Europe; Evgeniia Dolzhenkova; Matúš Černek; Laura Kovárová; Nikita Philippov	40:56	+5:48
10	11	World 1 Ema Chlepkova; Trym Dalset Lødøen; Roksana Saveh Shemshaki; Findlay Eyre	41:44	+6:36
11	6	Romania; Larisa Daniela Coşofreţ; George Petruţ Cotinghiu; Anca Alexandra Olaru; Constantin Surdu	45:11	+10:03
