= Oriol Cardona =

Spanish ski mountaineer (born 1994)

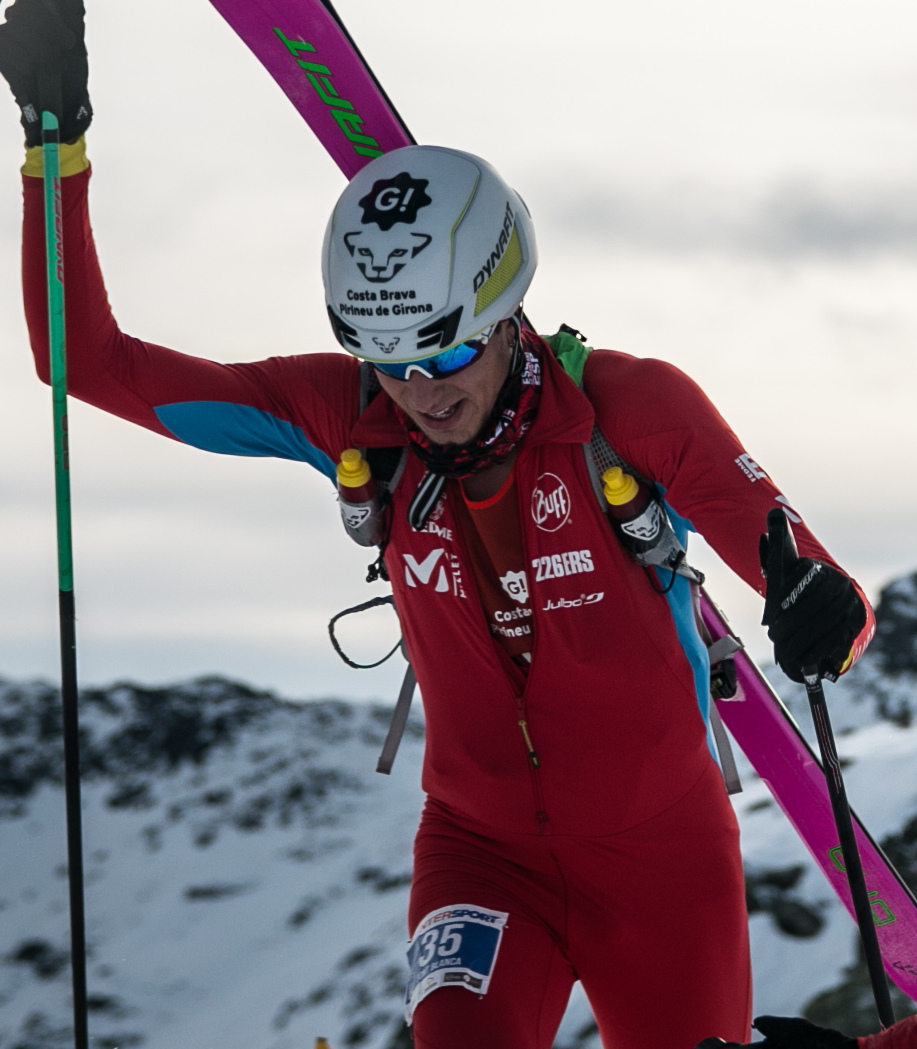
- Cadorna at ISMF Ski Mountaineering World Cup Font Blanca 2017

Personal information
- Born: Oriol Cardona Coll; 7 October 1994 (age 31) Banyoles, Spain
- Height: 1.82 m (6 ft 0 in)
- Weight: 72 kg (159 lb)

Sport
- Country: Spain
- Sport: Ski mountaineering Skyrunning
Medal record
Representing Spain
Men's ski mountaineering
Olympic Games
Gold medal – first place	2026 Milano Cortina	Sprint
Bronze medal – third place	2026 Milano Cortina	Mixed relay
World Championships
Gold medal – first place	2023 Boí Taüll	Sprint race
Gold medal – first place	2025 Morgins	Sprint race
Silver medal – second place	2021 Comapedrosa La Massana	Sprint race
Silver medal – second place	2025 Morgins	Mixed relay
Bronze medal – third place	2017 Tambre	Sprint race
Bronze medal – third place	2019 Villars-sur-Ollon	Team race
European Championships
Gold medal – first place	2022 Boi Taull	Sprint race
Gold medal – first place	2024 Flaine / Chamonix	Sprint race
Gold medal – first place	2024 Flaine / Chamonix	Mixed relay
Men's mountain running
World Championships
Silver medal – second place	2021 Chiang Mai	Team up and downhill race
Bronze medal – third place	2021 Chiang Mai	Team uphill race
World Long Distance Championships
Gold medal – first place	2019 Villa La Angostura	Team
Bronze medal – third place	2019 Villa La Angostura	Individual

Oriol Cardona Coll (born 7 October 1994) is a Spanish ski mountaineer and skyrunner. He represented Spain at the 2026 Winter Olympics and won a gold medal in the sprint race, the first gold medal for Spain at the Winter Olympic Games since 1972.

== Career ==
Cardona made his European Championships debut in 2022 and won a gold medal in the sprint race with a time of 3:17.988. He then competed at the 2023 World Championship of Ski Mountaineering and won a gold medal in the sprint race with a time of 2:35.218. He again competed at the 2024 European Championships and won a gold medal in the mixed relay along with Ana Alonso Rodriguez.

On 26 January 2025, during the first mixed relay of the season, he won a gold medal with a time of 30:23.6. He finished the 2024–25 ISMF Ski Mountaineering World Cup reaching the podium in all five relay events, including three golds and two silvers, to win the mixed relay World Cup title with 480 points. He also finished first in the men's sprint World Cup standings with 575 points.

He again competed at the 2025 World Championship of Ski Mountaineering and won a gold medal in the sprint race with a time of 2:45.40. With the win, Spain earned a quota spot for the discipline at the 2026 Winter Olympics. He also won a silver medal in the mixed relay, along with Rodriguez, with a time of 32:45.0, losing to France's team of Emily Harrop and Thibault Anselmet by 0.9 seconds. He earned a scholarship for the 2026 Winter Olympics.

On 19 February 2026, Cardona won the first-ever men's Olympic gold medal in ski mountaineering, finishing in first place in the sprint race with a time of 2:34.03. This marked Spain's first Winter Olympic gold medal since 1972. On 21 February 2026, he won a bronze medal in the mixed relay, along with Alonso, with a time of 27:23.94.

== Personal life ==
Since 2023, he has been in a relationship with actress Amaia Aberasturi.
