= Aurélien Gay =

Swiss ski mountaineer (born 2000)

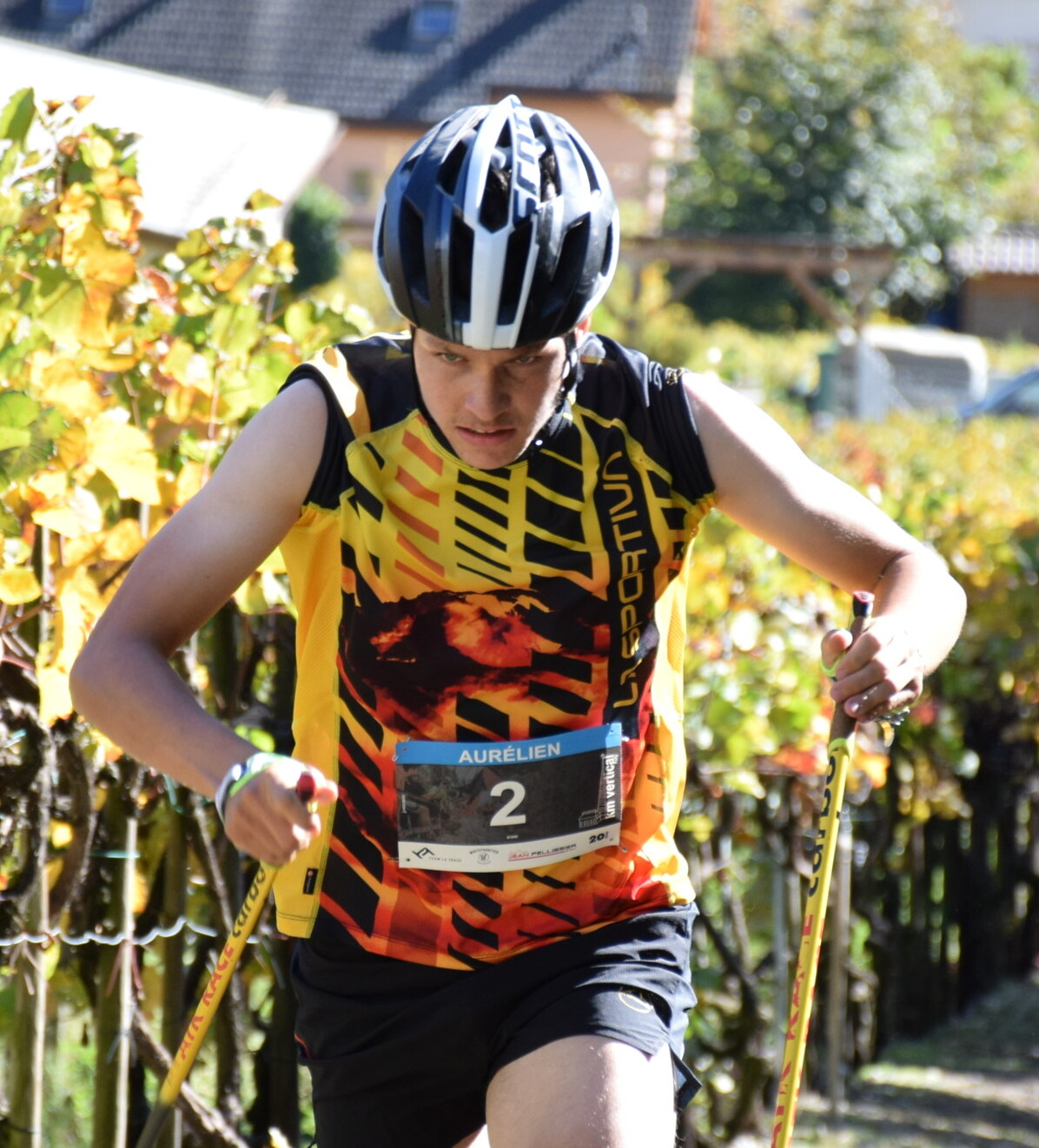
- Gay in 2022

Personal information
- Born: 29 May 2000 (age 26) Martigny, Switzerland
- Height: 1.80 m (5 ft 11 in)
- Weight: 69 kg (152 lb)

Sport
- Country: Switzerland
- Sport: Ski mountaineering
Medal record
Representing Switzerland
Men's ski mountaineering
World Championships
Silver medal – second place	2025 Morgins	Team race
Bronze medal – third place	2025 Morgins	Vertical race

Aurélien Gay (born 29 May 2000) is a Swiss ski mountaineer.

== Career ==
During the opening vertical race of the 2024–25 ISMF Ski Mountaineering World Cup on 15 December 2024, Gay earned his first career World Cup podium, finishing in second place, behind his compatriot Rémi Bonnet.

He competed at the 2025 World Championship of Ski Mountaineering and won a silver medal in the team race, along with Bonnet, with a time of 2:13:33.4. He also won a bronze medal in the vertical race with a time of 19:40.3.

He competed at the 2026 European Championship of Ski Mountaineering and won a silver medal in the vertical race behind his compatriot Rémi Bonnet.
