= Robin Bussard =

Swiss ski mountaineer (born 2002)

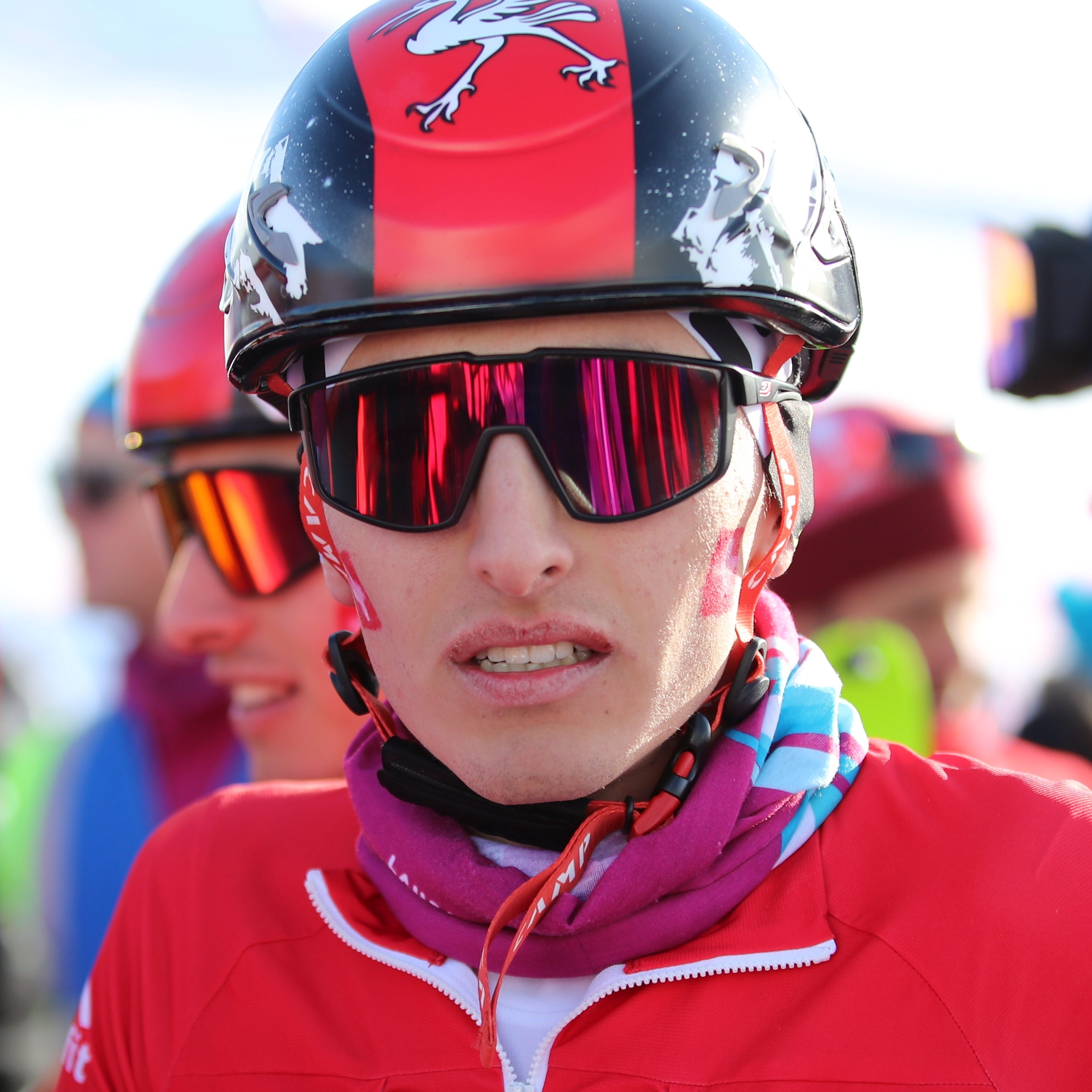
- Bussard at the 2020 Winter Youth Olympics

Personal information
- Born: 20 August 2002 (age 24) Albeuve, Switzerland
- Height: 1.78 m (5 ft 10 in)
- Weight: 61 kg (134 lb)

Sport
- Country: Switzerland
- Sport: Ski mountaineering
Medal record
Men's ski mountaineering
Representing Switzerland
World Championships
Bronze medal – third place	2025 Morgins	Mixed relay
Youth Olympic Games
Gold medal – first place	2020 Lausanne	Mixed relay
Silver medal – second place	2020 Lausanne	Individual race

Robin Bussard (born 20 August 2002) is a Swiss ski mountaineer.

== Early life ==
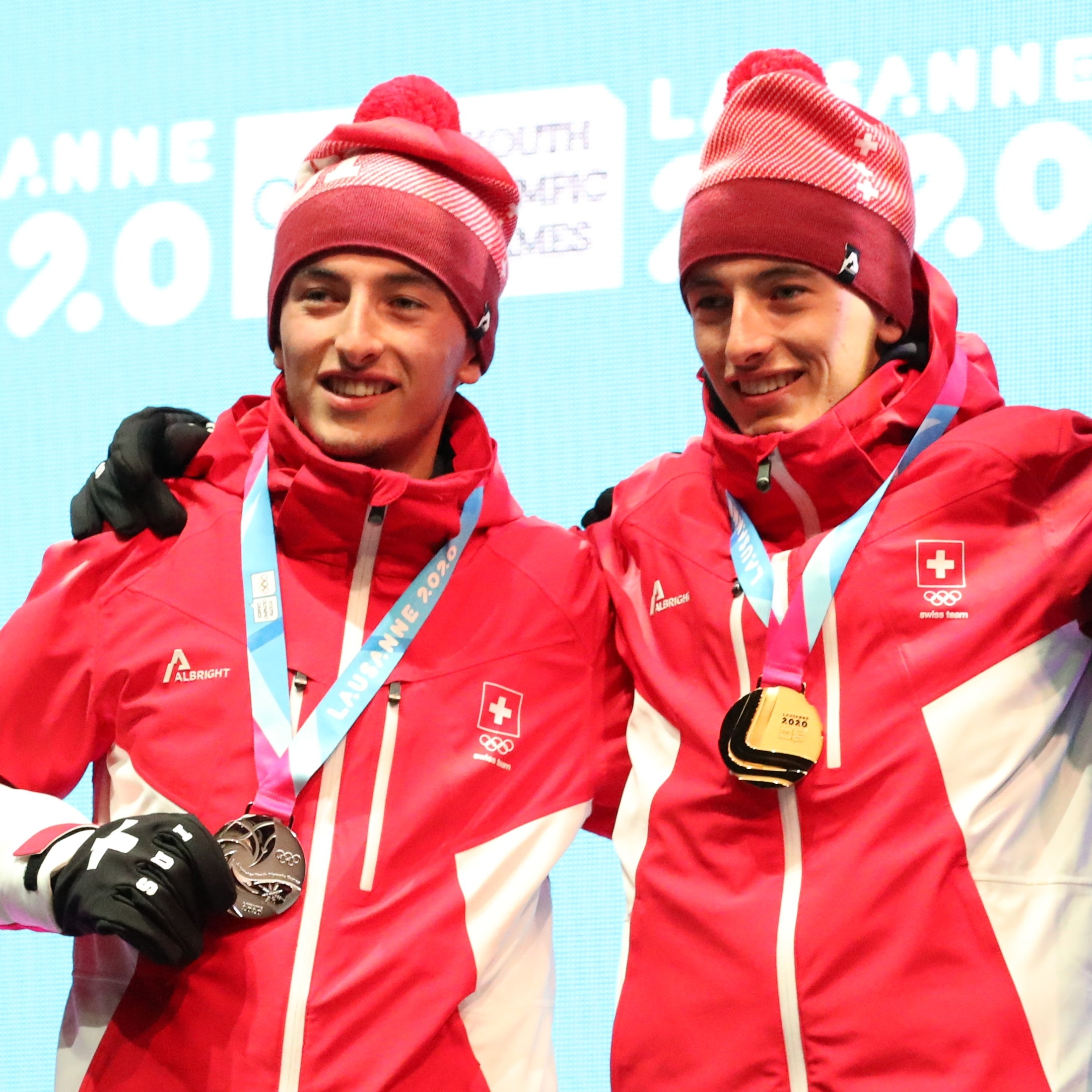
Robin (left) with his twin brother, Thomas (right).

Bussard began alpine skiing at three-years old, and went on his first ski mountaineering tour at eight years, and entered his first race at 14 years old. His twin brother, Thomas, is also a ski mountaineer. His father, François, is a two-time Swiss ski mountaineering champion.

== Career ==
Bussard represented Switzerland at the 2020 Winter Youth Olympics in ski mountaineering, an event making its Youth Olympics debut. He began the Youth Olympics with a silver medal in the individual race with a time of 49:16.54, finishing behind his twin brother, Thomas Bussard. He also won a gold medal in the mixed relay with a time of 35:07.

He competed at the 2025 World Championship of Ski Mountaineering and won a bronze medal in the mixed team relay, along with Marianne Fatton, with a time of 33:02.9.

During the 2023–24 ISMF Ski Mountaineering World Cup on 2 February 2024, he earned his first career World Cup win in the sprint race.
