= Individual Neutral Athletes at the 2026 Winter Olympics =

Name used for Russian and Belarusian athletes at the 2026 Winter Olympics

- The final version of the AIN flag assigned by the IOC on 19 March 2024
- IOC code: AIN
- NOC: Athlètes Individuels Neutres

in Milan and Cortina d'Ampezzo, Italy 6 February 2026 – 22 February 2026
- Competitors: 20 (6 men and 14 women) in 8 sports
- Flag bearer: N/A (not participating in Parade of Nations)
- Medals: Gold 0 Silver 1 Bronze 0 Total 1

Winter Olympics appearances (overview)
- 2014; 2018; 2022; 2026

Other related appearances
- Soviet Union (1956–1988); Unified Team (1992); Russia (1994–2014); Olympic Athletes from Russia (2018); ROC (2022) Belarus (1994–2022)

Individual Neutral Athletes (French: Athlètes individuels neutres, AIN) is the name used to represent approved individual Russian and Belarusian athletes at the 2026 Winter Olympics, after the International Olympic Committee (IOC) banned those nations' previous designations due to the Russian invasion of Ukraine in 2022 that continued into the duration of the games. The IOC country code is AIN, from the French athlètes individuels neutres.

The delegation competed under the same conditions as for the 2024 Summer Olympics. It was banned from using the Olympic flag and Olympic anthem, which was the usual custom for neutral designated athletes in previous games. They instead used a teal flag depicting a circular AIN emblem and a one-off instrumental anthem, both assigned by the IOC. Individual neutral athletes had to be first background checked and then approved by each sport's international federation, and then by a special panel created by the IOC. As individual athletes, they could not compete in team events. The designation was also disallowed from marching in the Parade of Nations during the opening ceremony and from receiving an official ranking in the medal tables.

While the flag uses the singular wording "Individual Neutral Athlete", the IOC uses the plural wording "Individual Neutral Athletes" in prose.

== Background ==
=== Timeline ===
In December 2024, the International Skating Union announced that athletes from Belarus and Russia would be allowed to participate in events at the 2026 Winter Olympics; if qualified, they would compete under the Individual Neutral Athlete banner, as was done at the 2024 Summer Olympics in Paris. At the 2024 Summer Olympics, 15 Russian athletes and 17 Belarusian athletes competed as individual neutral athletes.

In the same month, the International Ski Mountaineering Federation announced that five Russian ski mountaineers would be allowed to compete as individual neutral athletes in the 2026 Winter Olympics qualifiers.

The IOC announced in September 2025 that Individual Neutral Athletes would compete at the 2026 Winter Olympics under the same rules as for the 2024 Summer Olympics, including the same eligibility requirements, teal flag, anthem, and the same restriction disallowing them from competing in team events.

=== Controversies ===
On 29 January 2026, Latvian Public Media, which is a part of the Public Broadcasting of Latvia, announced it would not cover the participation of Russian and Belarusian athletes competing as Individual Neutral Athletes, including their individual events. Results and rankings would be displayed, but with such athletes missing. Except for situations when complete separation is not possible, live broadcasts would be halted during Russian and Belarusian athletes' performances. Whenever this happened, the LTV7 coverage would either switch to a different sport, air full-length interviews with Latvian athletes, or shift to other content. Broadcasts could also be stopped for advertisement breaks, and live Olympic programming could also end earlier than advertised. Earlier that month, Tom Circenis, the TV3 Group's director of sports programming, confirmed that the production team of their coverage would stop their Olympic broadcasts on linear channels whenever there was a Russian and Belarusian athlete competing in an individual contest (where competitors compete one at a time) and go straight to a full-length commercial break each time, describing this as an editorial decision coordinated with the Latvian Olympic Committee. The policy that was written up for the coverage constitutes a partial boycott in response to the participation of neutral athletes from "aggressor countries". TV3 also decided that Latvia’s performances in team events such as bobsleigh and ice hockey were the main priority, and not necessarily those of individual athletes. This was not new, as additional commercial breaks were added into coverage of the European Luge Championships the previous week during Russian athletes' runs.

== Medalists ==
Medal	Name	Country	Sport	Event	Date
Silver	Nikita Filippov	Russia	Ski mountaineering	Men's sprint	19 February

== Competitors ==
The following is the list of number of competitors participating at the Games per sport/discipline.

20 competitors from the following nations competed under the AIN banner:

1. Belarus – 7 competitors
2. Russia – 13 competitors

The following is a list of the number of Individual Neutral Athletes that participated at the Games:

Sport	Men		Women		Total
Sport	Belarus	Russia	Belarus	Russia	Total
Alpine skiing	0	1	1	1	3
Cross-country skiing	0	1	1	1	3
Figure skating	0	1	1	1	3
Freestyle skiing	0	0	3	0	3
Luge	0	1	0	1	2
Short-track speed skating	0	1	0	1	2
Ski mountaineering	0	1	0	0	1
Speed skating	0	0	1	2	3
Total	0	6	7	7	20

== Alpine skiing ==
Two female alpine skiers and one male alpine skier qualified as Individual Neutral Athletes through the basic quota.

Athlete	From	Event	Run 1		Run 2		Total	
Athlete	From	Event	Time	Rank	Time	Rank	Time	Rank
Simon Efimov	Russia	Men's slalom	DNF					
Julia Pleshkova	Russia	Women's downhill	—N/a				1:39.69	22
Julia Pleshkova	Russia	Women's super-G	—N/a				1:26.32	19
Maria Shkanova	Belarus	Women's slalom	51.86	43	56.08	37	1:47.94	37

== Cross-country skiing ==
Following the completion of the 2025–26 FIS Cross-Country World Cup in the first World Cup period (28 November – 14 December 2025), a further two female athletes and one male athlete qualified as Individual Neutral Athletes.

=== Distance ===
Athlete	From	Event	Classical		Freestyle		Final		
Athlete	From	Event	Time	Rank	Time	Rank	Time	Deficit	Rank
Savelii Korostelev	Russia	Men's 10 km freestyle	—N/a				21:42.3	+1:06.1	15
Savelii Korostelev	Russia	Men's 20 km skiathlon	23:24.7	6	22:23.6	4	46:14.6	+3.6	4
Savelii Korostelev	Russia	Men's 50 km classical	—N/a				2:10:23.1	+3:38.3	5
Hanna Karaliova	Belarus	Women's 10 km freestyle	—N/a				25:59.3	+3:10.1	45
Hanna Karaliova	Belarus	Women's 20 km skiathlon	30:00.5	35	29:12.9	34	59:45.6	+6:00.4	34
Dariya Nepryaeva	Russia	Women's 10 km freestyle	—N/a				24:45.0	+1:55.8	21
Dariya Nepryaeva	Russia	Women's 20 km skiathlon	29:01.4	20	28:07.7	19	57:41.3	+3:56.1	17
Dariya Nepryaeva	Russia	Women's 50 km classical	—N/a				Disqualified		

=== Sprint ===
Athlete	From	Event	Qualification		Quarterfinal		Semifinal		Final	Rank
Athlete	From	Event	Time	Rank	Time	Rank	Time	Rank	Time	Rank
Savelii Korostelev	Russia	Men's sprint	3:19.88	35	Did not advance					
Hanna Karaliova	Belarus	Women's sprint	3:57.25	48	Did not advance					
Dariya Nepryaeva	Russia	Women's sprint	3:51.60	36	Did not advance					

== Figure skating ==
One Individual Neutral Athlete qualified in men's singles and two in women's singles at the ISU Skate to Milano Figure Skating Qualifier 2025 in Beijing, China.

Athlete	From	Event	SP		FP		Total	
Athlete	From	Event	Points	Rank	Points	Rank	Points	Rank
Petr Gumennik	Russia	Men's singles	86.72	12 Q	184.49	4	271.21	6
Adeliia Petrosian	Russia	Women's singles	72.89	5 Q	141.64	5	214.53	6
Viktoriia Safonova	Belarus	Women's singles	54.57	26	Did not advance			

== Freestyle skiing ==
Athlete	From	Event	Qualification					Final					
Athlete	From	Event	Jump 1		Jump 2	Best	Rank	Final 1				Final 2	
Athlete	From	Event	Points	Rank	Points	Points	Rank	Jump 1	Jump 2	Best	Rank	Points	Rank
Anastasiya Andryianava	Belarus	Women's aerials	74.02	15	70.39	74.02	16	Did not advance					
Anna Derugo	Belarus	Women's aerials	58.90	18	71.63	71.63	17	Did not advance					
Hanna Huskova	Belarus	Women's aerials	88.29	7	82.73	88.29	8 Q	86.44	100.29	100.29	8	Did not advance	

== Luge ==
Athlete	From	Event	Run 1		Run 2		Run 3		Run 4		Total	
Athlete	From	Event	Time	Rank	Time	Rank	Time	Rank	Time	Rank	Time	Rank
Pavel Repilov	Russia	Men's singles	53.861	17	53.847	15	53.692	16	53.563	11	3:34.963	14
Daria Olesik	Russia	Women's singles	53.289	13	53.362	15	53.348	14	53.211	14	3:33.210	13

== Short-track speed skating ==
Two short-track speed skaters (one per gender) qualified as Individual Neutral Athletes after the conclusion of the 2025–26 ISU Short Track World Tour.

Athlete	From	Event	Heat		Quarterfinal		Semifinal		Final	
Athlete	From	Event	Time	Rank	Time	Rank	Time	Rank	Time	Rank
Ivan Posashkov	Russia	Men's 1000 m	PEN		Did not advance					
Ivan Posashkov	Russia	Men's 1500 m	—N/a		2:19.117	5	Did not advance			
Alena Krylova	Russia	Women's 500 m	1:06.997	4	Did not advance					
Alena Krylova	Russia	Women's 1000 m	1:28.495	3 q	2:31.857	4 ADV	2:10.169	5 QB	1:31.702	9

== Ski mountaineering ==
One male ski mountaineer qualified as an Individual Neutral Athlete through the 2025 ISMF World Championships.

Athlete	From	Event	Heat		Semifinal		Final	
Athlete	From	Event	Time	Rank	Time	Rank	Time	Rank
Nikita Filippov	Russia	Men's sprint	2:39.84	2 Q	2:34.53	2 Q	2:35.55	2nd place, silver medalist(s)

== Speed skating ==
Three female speed skaters qualified as Individual Neutral Athletes through performances at the 2025–26 ISU Speed Skating World Cup.

Athlete	From	Event	Race	
Athlete	From	Event	Time	Rank
Kseniia Korzhova	Russia	Women's 3000 m	4:05.84	12
Maryna Zuyeva	Belarus	Women's 3000 m	4:07.09	15
Maryna Zuyeva	Belarus	Women's 5000 m	6:57.70	6

=== Mass start ===
Athlete	From	Event	Semifinal			Final		
Athlete	From	Event	Points	Time	Rank	Points	Time	Rank
Anastasiia Semenova	Russia	Women's	1	8:45.91	9	Did not advance		
Maryna Zuyeva	Belarus	Women's	0	8:39.63	11	Did not advance		

== See also ==
- Individual Neutral Athletes at the 2024 Summer Olympics
- Russia at the 2026 Winter Paralympics
- Belarus at the 2026 Winter Paralympics
