= Maximilien Drion =

Belgian ski mountaineer (born 1997)

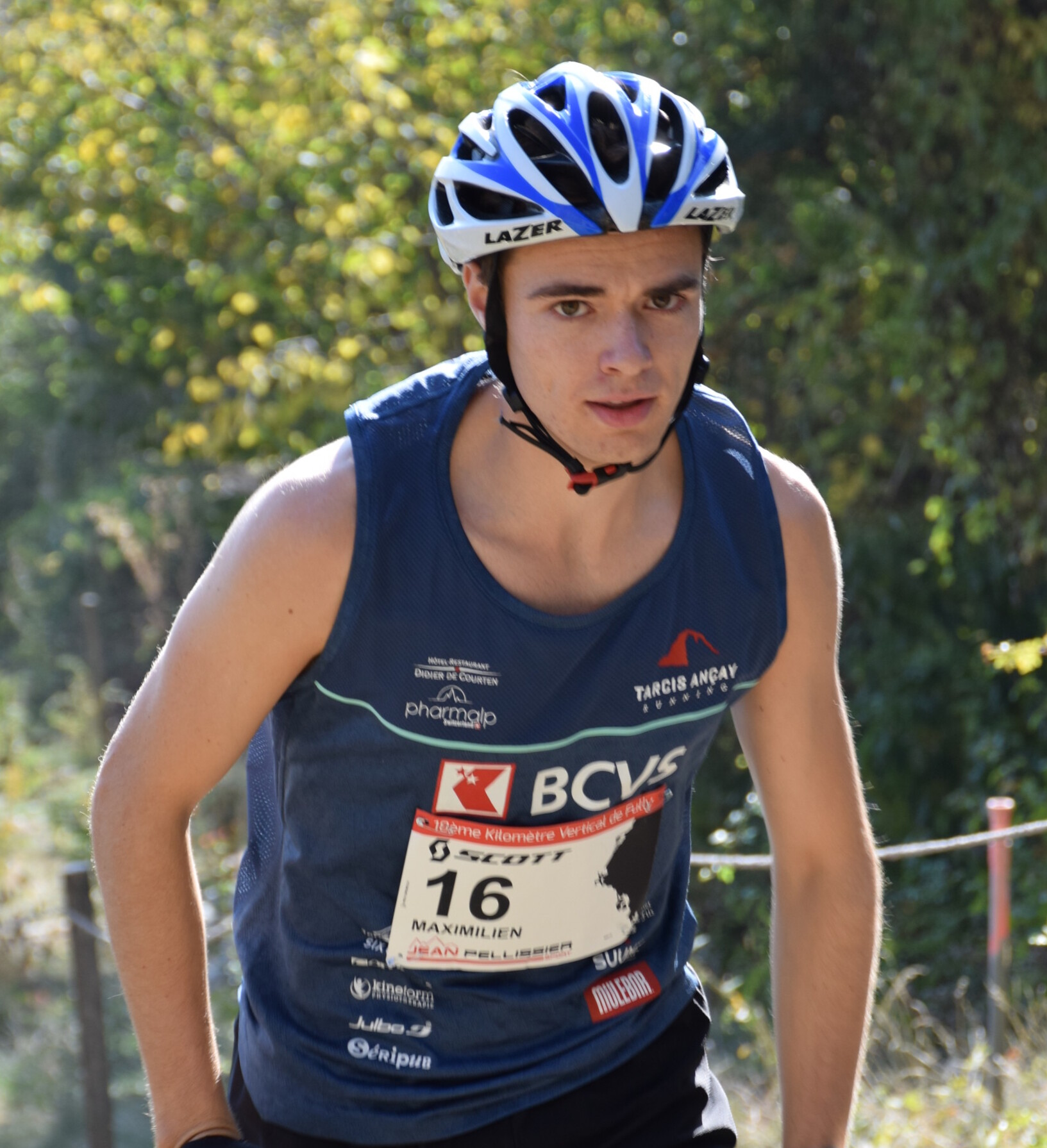
- Drion in 2018

Personal information
- Full name: Maximilien Drion du Chapois
- Born: 28 September 1997 (age 28) Uccle, Belgium
- Height: 1.78 m (5 ft 10 in)
- Weight: 65 kg (143 lb)

Sport
- Country: Belgium
- Sport: Ski mountaineering
Medal record
Men's ski mountaineering
Representing Belgium
World Championships
Silver medal – second place	2023 Boí Taüll	Vertical race
Silver medal – second place	2025 Morgins	Vertical race
European Championships
Bronze medal – third place	2022 Boi Taull	Vertical race

Maximilien Drion du Chapois (born 28 September 1997) is a Belgian ski mountaineer and trail runner.

== Early life ==
Drion was introduced to mountaineering by his parents at five years old. In 2008, his family moved to Vercorin, Switzerland. There he met Claude-Gérard Lamon, who introduced him to ski mountaineering at ten years old. To complement his winter activities, he took up mountain running and trail running during the summer.

== Career ==
On 26 March 2021, Drion earned his first career World Cup victory in the vertical race. He then competed at the 2022 European Championships and won a bronze medal in the vertical race with a time of 23:24.

He competed at the 2023 World Championship of Ski Mountaineering and won a silver medal in the vertical race with a time of 22:54.9. During the 2024–25 ISMF Ski Mountaineering World Cup he finished second in the overall standings with 896 points.

In March 2025, he competed at the 2025 World Championship of Ski Mountaineering and won a silver medal in the vertical race with a time of 19:37.0. During the first race of the 2025–26 ISMF Ski Mountaineering World Cup on 7 December 2025, he finished in third place in the sprint event.

He finished in second place in the Olympic qualification rankings, and qualified to represent Belgium at the 2026 Winter Olympics. He was selected as a flag bearer for Belgium during the 2026 Winter Olympics Parade of Nations, however, he did not arrive at the San Siro Stadium in time for the opening ceremony due to train delays.
