= Cameron Smith (ski mountaineer) =

American ski mountaineer (born 1995)

Personal information
- Born: September 18, 1995 (age 30) Rockford, Illinois, U.S.
- Height: 1.75 m (5 ft 9 in)
- Weight: 60 kg (132 lb)

Sport
- Country: United States
- Sport: Ski mountaineering

Cameron Smith (born September 18, 1995) is an American ski mountaineer. He will represent the United States at the 2026 Winter Olympics.

== Career ==
Smith attended Guilford High School in Rockford, Illinois. After graduating in 2014 he moved to Colorado to attend Western Colorado University and discovered ski mountaineering. He became the first American male to finish in the top of a World Cup race. He also became the first American male to earn a World Cup medal, which he accomplished on January 16, 2022, finishing in third place in the vertical race. He is an eleven-time US Ski Mountaineering national champion, and five-time North American Ski Mountaineering champion.

During the opening race of the 2025–26 ISMF Ski Mountaineering World Cup on December 6, 2025, he finished in first place in the mixed relay, along with Anna Gibson. They became the first American team in World Cup history to medal in the event. With the win, they earned an Olympic quota spot and qualified to represent the United States at the 2026 Winter Olympics.
