= Thomas Bussard =

Swiss ski mountaineer (born 2002)

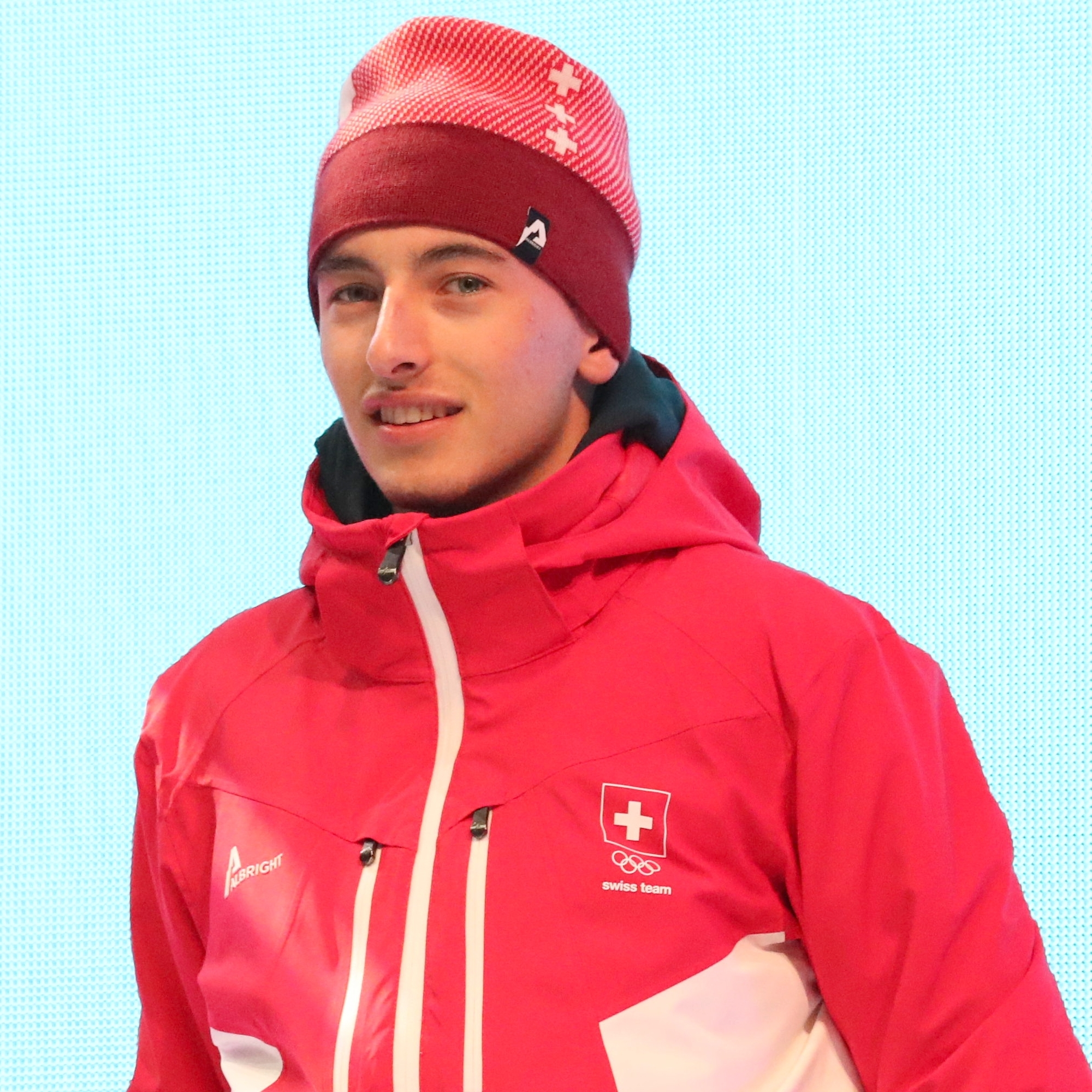
- Bussard at the 2020 Winter Youth Olympics

Personal information
- Born: 20 August 2002 (age 24) Albeuve, Switzerland
- Height: 1.77 m (5 ft 10 in)
- Weight: 50 kg (110 lb)

Sport
- Country: Switzerland
- Sport: Ski mountaineering
Medal record
Men's ski mountaineering
Representing Switzerland
Youth Olympic Games
Gold medal – first place	2020 Lausanne	Individual race
Gold medal – first place	2020 Lausanne	Mixed relay

Thomas Bussard (born 20 August 2002) is a Swiss ski mountaineer.

== Early life ==
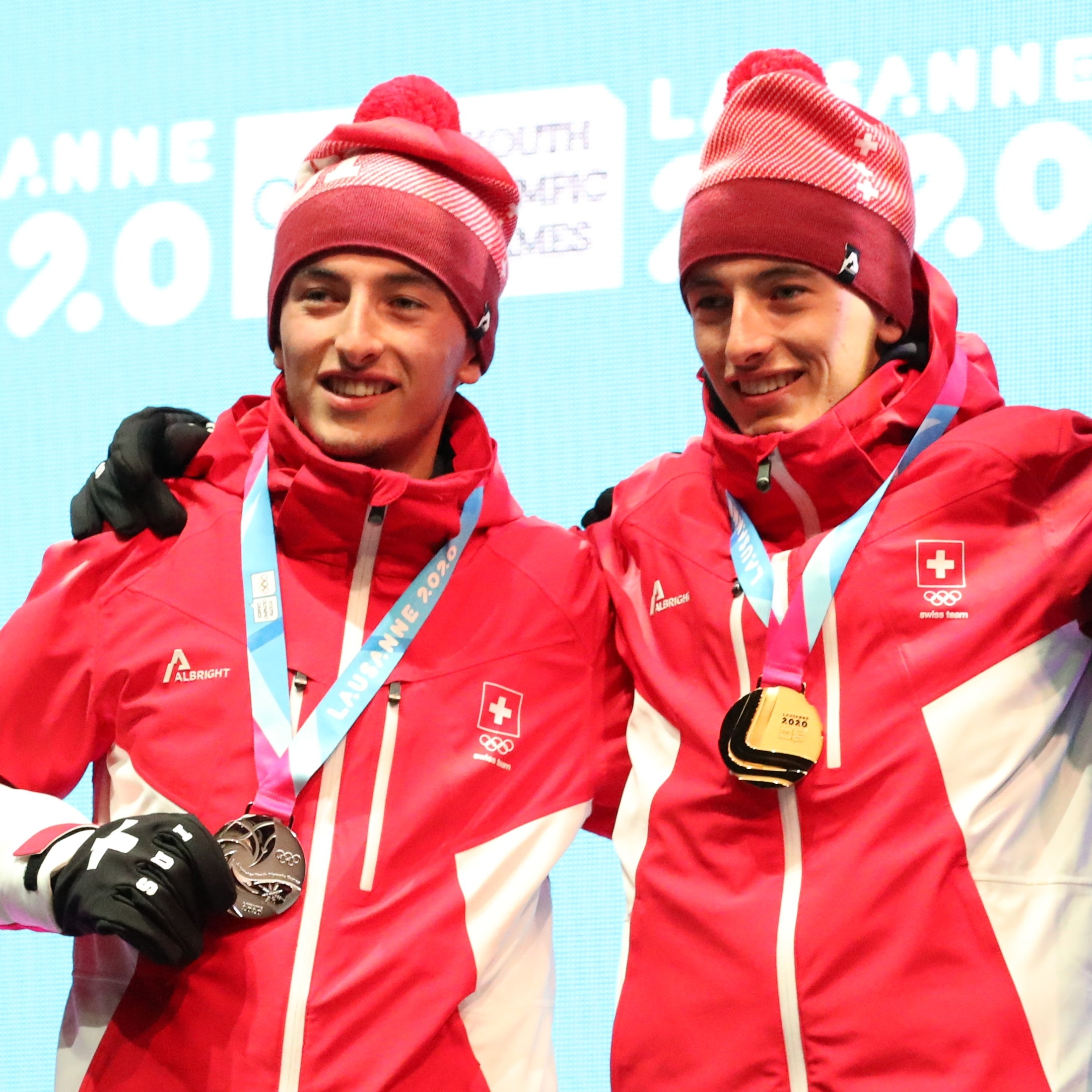
Thomas (right) with his twin brother, Robin, (left).

Bussard began alpine skiing at three-years old, and went on his first ski mountaineering tour at eight years, and entered his first race at 14 years old. His twin brother, Robin, is also a ski mountaineer. His father, François, is a two-time Swiss ski mountaineering champion.

== Career ==
Bussard represented Switzerland at the 2020 Winter Youth Olympics in ski mountaineering, an event making its Youth Olympics debut. He began the Youth Olympics with a gold medal in the individual race with a time of 47:49.85, finishing ahead of his twin brother, Robin Bussard. He also won a gold medal in the mixed relay with a time of 35:07.

He competed at the 2025 World Championship of Ski Mountaineering and won a gold medal in the under-23 individual race, with a time of 1:41:35.7, and a silver medal in the under-23 sprint race, with a time of 2:51.69.

During the final race of the 2024–25 ISMF Ski Mountaineering World Cup on 12 April 2025, he earned his first career individual World Cup win in the sprint race.
