= Sarah Dreier =

Austrian ski mountaineer (born 1995)

Personal information
- Born: 6 September 1995 (age 30) Salzburg, Austria
- Height: 1.64 m (5 ft 5 in)
- Weight: 55 kg (121 lb)

Sport
- Country: Austria
- Sport: Ski mountaineering
- Event: Vertical race
Medal record
Representing Austria
Women's ski mountaineering
World Championships
Silver medal – second place	2023 Boí Taüll	Vertical race
Bronze medal – third place	2025 Morgins	Vertical race
European Championships
Gold medal – first place	2024 Flaine / Chamonix	Vertical race
Bronze medal – third place	2022 Boí Taüll	Vertical race

Sarah Dreier (born 6 September 1995) is an Austrian ski mountaineer.

== Career ==
Dreier competed at the 2022 European Championships of Ski Mountaineering and won a bronze medal in the vertical race with a time of 27:25.

She competed at the 2023 World Championship of Ski Mountaineering and won a silver medal in the vertical race with a time of 26:55.9. On 19 March 2023, she earned her first career World Cup victory in the vertical race. She finished the 2023 World Cup in first place in the vertical race standings. She repeated as World Cup champion in the vertical race finishing with 263 points during the 2024 World Cup.

She competed at the 2024 European Championships and won a gold medal in the vertical race. She won the 2024 Austrian national championship in the vertical race for the fifth year in a row. She competed at the 2025 World Championship of Ski Mountaineering and won a bronze medal in the vertical race with a time of 24:01.0.
