= Célia Perillat-Pessey =

French ski mountaineer (born 1997)

Personal information
- Born: 17 March 1997 (age 29) La Clusaz, France
- Height: 1.67 m (5 ft 6 in)
- Weight: 52 kg (115 lb)

Sport
- Country: France
- Sport: Ski mountaineering
Medal record
Women's ski mountaineering
Representing France
World Championships
Gold medal – first place	2025 Morgins	Team race
Bronze medal – third place	2023 Boí Taüll	Team race
European Championships
Silver medal – second place	2024 Flaine / Chamonix	Individual race
Silver medal – second place	2024 Flaine / Chamonix	Mixed relay

Célia Perillat-Pessey (born 17 March 1997) is a French ski mountaineer.

== Career ==
Perillat-Pessey earned her first World Cup victory on 16 December 2022 in the sprint race. She competed at the 2023 World Championship of Ski Mountaineering and won a bronze medal in the team race, along with Candice Bonnel, with a time of 2:17:48.8.

She competed at the 2024 European Championships of Ski Mountaineering and won silver medals in the individual race, and the mixed relay, along with Thibault Anselmet. She again competed at the 2025 World Championship of Ski Mountaineering and won a gold medal in the team race, along with Axelle Mollaret, with a time of 2:20:46.8.
