= Ana Alonso =

Spanish ski mountaineer (born 1994)

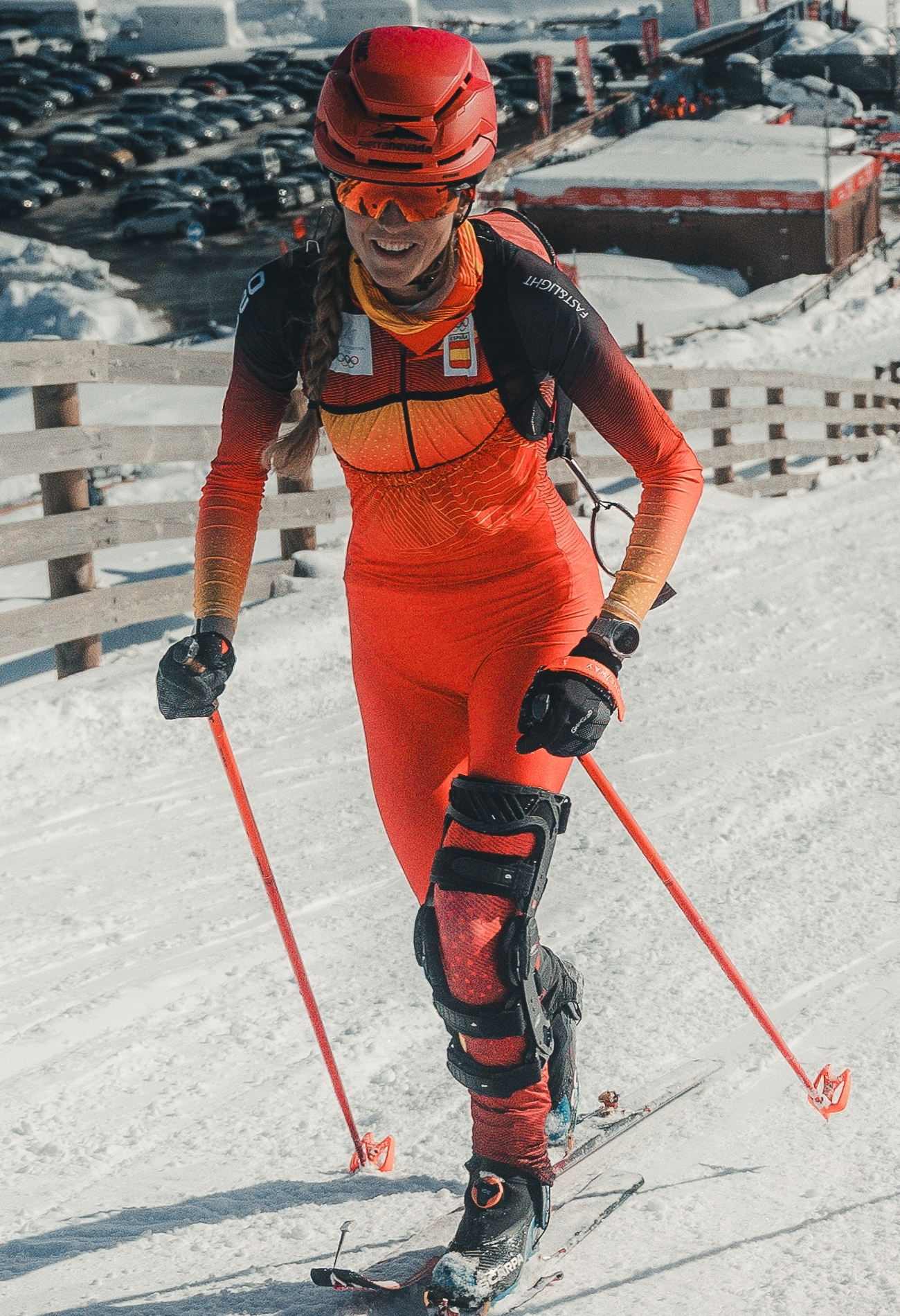

Personal information
- Born: Ana Alonso Rodriguez; 7 December 1994 (age 31) Granada, Spain
- Height: 1.71 m (5 ft 7 in)
- Weight: 56 kg (123 lb)

Sport
- Country: Spain
- Sport: Ski mountaineering
Medal record
Representing Spain
Women's ski mountaineering
Olympic Games
Bronze medal – third place	2026 Milano Cortina	Sprint
Bronze medal – third place	2026 Milano Cortina	Mixed relay
World Championships
Silver medal – second place	2025 Morgins	Mixed relay
European Championships
Gold medal – first place	2024 Flaine / Chamonix	Mixed relay
Silver medal – second place	2024 Flaine / Chamonix	Sprint race

Ana Alonso Rodriguez (born 7 December 1994) is a Spanish ski mountaineer. She represented Spain at the 2026 Winter Olympics and won two bronze medals.

== Career ==
Rodriguez competed at the 2022 European Championships and finished in fourth place in the inaugural mixed relay, along with Oriol Cardona Coll. She again competed at the 2024 European Championships and won a gold medal in the mixed relay along with Cardona.

On 18 February 2023, she earned her first World Cup victory in the mixed relay along with Oriol Cardona. On 26 January 2025, during the first mixed relay of the season, she won a gold medal with a time of 30:23.6. She finished the 2024–25 ISMF Ski Mountaineering World Cup reaching the podium in all five relay events, including three golds and two silvers, to win the mixed relay World Cup title with 480 points. She also finished third in the women's sprint, and third overall in the World Cup standings.

Rodriguez competed at the 2025 World Championship of Ski Mountaineering and won a silver medal in the mixed relay, along with Oriol Cardona Coll, with a time of 32:45.0, losing to France's team of Emily Harrop and Thibault Anselmet by 0.9 seconds. As a result, Spain earned a quota spot for the discipline at the 2026 Winter Olympics.

In October 2025, she was hit by a car while cycling and suffered a torn anterior cruciate ligament (ACL) and medial collateral ligament (MCL) with bone oedema in the knee, a malleolar fracture, and an acromioclavicular joint dislocation, all affecting the left side of her body. She forwent surgery to compete at the Olympics. On 19 February 2026, she won a bronze in the sprint race with a time of 3:10.22. She competed with a torn ACL and won Spain's first medal of the 2026 Winter Olympics, and their sixth ever at a Winter Olympics. On 21 February 2026, she won a bronze medal in the mixed relay, along with Cardona, with a time of 27:23.94.
