= Arno Lietha =

Swiss ski mountaineer (born 1998)

Personal information
- Born: 20 November 1998 (age 27) Fideris, Switzerland
- Height: 1.89 m (6 ft 2 in)
- Weight: 78 kg (172 lb)

Sport
- Country: Switzerland
- Sport: Ski mountaineering
Medal record
Men's ski mountaineering
Representing Switzerland
World Championships
| Gold medal – first place | 2019 Villars-sur-Ollon | Sprint race |
| Silver medal – second place | 2017 Alpago | Sprint race |
European Championships
| Silver medal – second place | 2024 Flaine / Chamonix | Sprint race |

Arno Lietha (born 20 November 1998) is a Swiss ski mountaineer. He will represent Switzerland at the 2026 Winter Olympics.

== Career ==
Lietha began his career in alpine skiing before switching to ski mountaineering at 16 years old. He competed at the 2019 World Championship and won a gold medal in the sprint race.

He won the World Cup sprint crystal globe three consecutive years from 2021 to 2023.
