= 2025 World Championship of Ski Mountaineering =

Ski competition

- Host city: Morgins
- Country: Switzerland
- Events: 28
- Opening: 2 March 2025
- Closing: 8 March 2025

The 2025 World Championship of Ski Mountaineering was held in Morgins, Switzerland, from 2 to 8 March 2025. It was the thirteenth edition of the event.

== Medal summary ==
=== Medal table ===
* Host nation (Switzerland)

Rank	Nation	Gold	Silver	Bronze	Total
1	Switzerland*	7	5	4	16
2	France	5	7	3	15
3	China	5	2	2	9
4	Spain	4	1	5	10
5	United States	3	0	2	5
6	Slovenia	2	0	0	2
7	Italy	1	5	3	9
8	Sweden	1	1	0	2
9	Norway	0	3	3	6
10	Austria	0	2	4	6
11	Germany	0	1	2	3
12	Belgium	0	1	0	1
Totals (12 entries)		28	28	28	84

=== Senior ===
==== Men ====
Event	Gold		Silver		Bronze	
Sprint Race	Oriol Cardona Coll; Spain	2:45.40	Thibault Anselmet; France	2:49.71	Jon Kistler; Switzerland	2:50.05
Vertical Race	Rémi Bonnet; Switzerland	18:50.3	Maximilien Drion du Chapois; Belgium	19:37.0	Aurélien Gay; Switzerland	19:40.3
Individual Race	Rémi Bonnet; Switzerland	1:33:07.4	Davide Magnini; Italy	1:35:30.6	Xavier Gachet; France	1:38:57.9
Team Race	Xavier Gachet; William Bon Mardion; France	2:12:42.1	Rémi Bonnet; Aurélien Gay; Switzerland	2:13:33.4	Samuel Equy; Mathéo Jacquemoud; France	2:13:42.4

==== Women ====
Event	Gold		Silver		Bronze	
Sprint Race	Marianne Fatton; Switzerland	3:20.96	Emily Harrop; France	3:13.04	Tatjana Paller; Germany	3:30.75
Vertical Race	Axelle Gachet Mollaret; France	22:24.9	Tove Alexandersson; Sweden	23:06.0	Sarah Dreier; Austria	24:01.0
Individual Race	Tove Alexandersson; Sweden	1:34:01.8	Axelle Gachet Mollaret; France	1:36:03.5	Emily Harrop; France	1:40:43.1
Team Race	Axelle Gachet Mollaret; Célia Perillat Pessey; France	2:20:46.8	Alba de Silvestro; Lisa Moreschini; Italy	2:22:04.6	Giulia Compagnoni; Ilaria Veronese; Italy	2:26:01.6

==== Mixed ====
Event	Gold		Silver		Bronze	
Relay	Emily Harrop; Thibault Anselmet; France	32:44.1	Ana Alonso Rodriguez; Oriol Cardona Coll; Spain	32:45.0	Marianne Fatton; Robin Bussard; Switzerland	33:02.9

=== Under-23 ===
==== Men ====
Event	Gold		Silver		Bronze	
Sprint Race	Jon Kistler; Switzerland	2:50.05	Thomas Bussard; Switzerland	2:51.69	Ot Ferrer Martínez; Spain	2:50.83
Vertical Race	Klemen Španring; Slovenia	20:01.0	Anselme Damevin; France (Note: Nikita Filippov from Russia originally won silver medal, but as "neutral athlete".)	20:22.4	Nils Oberauer; Austria	20:29.8
Individual Race	Thomas Bussard; Switzerland	1:41:35.7	Anselme Damevin; France	1:43:18.8	Hermann Debertolis; Italy	1:43:27.6

==== Women ====
Event	Gold		Silver		Bronze	
Sprint Race	Caroline Ulrich; Switzerland	3:30.35	Ida Waldal; Norway	3:30.82	Maria Costa; Spain	3:40.30
Vertical Race	Thibe Deseyn; Switzerland	24:23.6	Caroline Ulrich; Switzerland	24:37.4	Cidan Yuzhen; China	25:12.8
Individual Race	Margot Ravinel; France	1:46:39.4	Thibe Deseyn; Switzerland	1:47:31.4	Caroline Ulrich; Switzerland	1:49:25.0

=== Under-20 ===
==== Men ====
Event	Gold		Silver		Bronze	
Sprint Race	Griffin Briley; United States	3:22.41	Lorenzo Milesi; Italy	3:41.41	Bi Yuxin; China	3:27.72
Vertical Race	Griffin Briley; United States	21:22.6	Silvano Wolf; Austria	21:30.5	Gonzalo Casares Hervias; Spain	22:01.0
Individual Race	Griffin Briley; United States	1:32:21.3	Bu Luer; China	1:32:44.3	Silvano Wolf; Austria	1:33:15.9

==== Women ====
Event	Gold		Silver		Bronze	
Sprint Race	Laia Sellés Sánchez; Spain	3:58.32	Robine Deseyn; Switzerland	3:55.90	Emma Albrecht; Austria	3:45.29
Vertical Race	Klara Velepec; Slovenia	27:00.9	Elise Hjelset Andersen; Norway	27:09.7	Laia Sellés Sánchez; Spain	27:12.0
Individual Race	Cidan Yuzhen; China	1:24:11.7	Camille Maupoix; France	1:30:40.5	Elise Hjelset Andersen; Norway	1:31:11.3

=== Under-18 ===
==== Men ====
Event	Gold		Silver		Bronze	
Sprint Race	Gil Rocias Sacrest; Spain	3:22.45	Aron Rodal Haugen; Norway	3:11.11	Isak Drøpping; Norway	3:11.41
Vertical Race	Gongsong Langjia; China	22:44.4	Moritz Bauregger; Germany	22:56.2	Aron Rodal Haugen; Norway	23:13.7
Individual Race	Gongsong Langjia; China	1:17:01.1	Kilian Rettensteiner; Austria	1:18:09.0	Moritz Bauregger; Germany	1:18:39.1

==== Women ====
Event	Gold		Silver		Bronze	
Sprint Race	Giorgia Pollini; Italy	4:01.58	Pumu Ani; China	4:13.31	Sienna Petersen; United States	4:09.86
Vertical Race	Pumu Ani; China	28:09.8	Teresa Schivalocchi; Italy	28:47.3	Giorgia Pollini; Italy	29:08.7
Individual Race	Pumu Ani; China	1:35:35.6	Giorgia Pollini; Italy	1:36:15.4	Maria Ramirez Tio; Spain	1:39:36.5

=== Youth Mixed ===
Event	Gold		Silver		Bronze	
Relay	Laia Sellés Sánchez; Gonzalo Casares Hervias; Spain	38:18.4	Camille Maupoix; Celestin Gullon; France	38:41.1	McCall Birkinshaw; Griffin Briley; United States	38:49.5
