= Johanna Hiemer =

Austrian ski mountaineer (born 1995)

Personal information
- Born: 26 February 1995 (age 31) Schladming, Austria
- Height: 1.73 m (5 ft 8 in)
- Weight: 63 kg (139 lb)

Sport
- Country: Austria
- Sport: Ski mountaineering

Johanna Hiemer (born 26 February 1995) is an Austrian ski mountaineer. She represented Austria at the 2026 Winter Olympics.

== Career ==
Hiemer made her World Cup debut in 2016, and continued to compete on the World Cup level until February 2018 when she gave birth to her first child, Emil. She gave birth to her second son, Paul, in 2020. In the summer of 2021, after it was announced ski mountaineering would make its Olympic debut at the 2026 Winter Olympics, she decided to make a comeback.

She made her World Cup return in 2022. She earned her first career World Cup podium on 22 February 2024, finishing in third place in the individual race. Two days later, she finished second in the mixed relay event, along with Paul Verbnjak.

In January 2026, she was selected to represent Austria at the 2026 Winter Olympics. She will compete in the sprint and mixed relay, along with Verbnjak.
