= Hans-Inge Klette =

Norwegian ski mountaineer

Personal information
- Born: 17 August 1997 (age 29) Voss, Norway
- Height: 1.75 m (5 ft 9 in)
- Weight: 69 kg (152 lb)

Sport
- Country: Norway
- Sport: Ski mountaineering

Hans-Inge Klette (born 17 August 1997) is a Norwegian ski mountaineer who competed at the 2026 Winter Olympics. He reportedly climbed 475,000 vertical meters across 12 months around 2020.
