= Emily Harrop =

French ski mountaineer (born 1997)

Personal information
- Born: 27 September 1997 (age 28) Bourg-Saint-Maurice, France

Sport
- Country: France
- Sport: Ski mountaineering
Medal record
Women's ski mountaineering
Representing France
Olympic Games
Gold medal – first place	2026 Milano Cortina	Mixed relay
Silver medal – second place	2026 Milano Cortina	Sprint
World Championships
Gold medal – first place	2023 Boí Taüll	Team race
Gold medal – first place	2023 Boí Taüll	Mixed relay
Gold medal – first place	2025 Morgins	Mixed relay
Silver medal – second place	2025 Morgins	Sprint race
Bronze medal – third place	2023 Boí Taüll	Sprint race
Bronze medal – third place	2025 Morgins	Individual race
European Championships
Gold medal – first place	2022 Boi Taull	Mixed relay
Bronze medal – third place	2022 Boí Taüll	Sprint race

Emily Harrop (born 27 September 1997) is a French ski mountaineer. She is a three-time World Champion. She represented France at the 2026 Winter Olympics, where she won a gold medal in the mixed race and bronze medal in the sprint race.

== Early life ==
Harrop was born in the French Alps to English parents.

== Career ==
Harrop began her career in alpine skiing before switching to ski mountaineering at 20 years old. She made her European Championships debut in 2022 and won a gold medal in the inaugural mixed relay, along with Thibault Anselmet, with a time of 32:10. She also won a bronze medal in the sprint race with a time of 3:15.725.

Harrop made her World Championships debut at the 2023 World Championship of Ski Mountaineering. On the first day of the championships she won a bronze medal in the sprint race with a time of 3:16.248. She then won a gold medal in the team race, along with Axelle Gachet Mollaret, with a time of 2:12:48.9. On the final day of the championships she won a gold medal in the mixed team relay, along with Anselmet, with a time of 26:46.5.

In March 2025, she competed at the 2025 World Championship of Ski Mountaineering and won a gold medal in the mixed relay, along with Anselmet, with a time of 32:44.1. With the win, France earned a quota spot for the discipline at the 2026 Winter Olympics. She also won a silver medal in the sprint race, with a time of 3:13.04, and a bronze medal in the individual race with a time of 1:40:43.1.

During the 2024–25 ISMF Ski Mountaineering World Cup, she won gold in the first-ever Olympic ski mountaineering test event, held in Bormio, Italy, on 22 February 2025. The win marked her fourth sprint win of the season. She finished the season with seven wins out of seven races in the discipline, and won the sprint and overall World Cup crystal globe for the fourth consecutive season.

In January 2026, Harrop was selected to represent France at the 2026 Winter Olympics. On 19 February 2026, she won a silver medal in the sprint race with a time of 3:02.15. On 21 February 2026, she won a gold medal in the mixed relay, along with Anselmet, with a time of 26:57.44.
