= Ida Waldal =

Norwegian ski mountaineer (born 2004)

Personal information
- Born: 18 June 2004 (age 21) Hommelvik, Norway
- Height: 1.65 m (5 ft 5 in)
- Weight: 51 kg (112 lb)

Sport
- Country: Norway
- Sport: Ski mountaineering

Ida Waldal (born 18 June 2004) is a Norwegian ski mountaineer and skyrunner. She represented Norway at the 2026 Winter Olympics.

== Career ==
Waldal competed at the 2021 Youth Skyrunning World Championships and won a gold medal in both the under-18 vertical kilometre and skyrace events. She again competed at the Youth Skyrunning World Championships in 2022 and won a gold medal in the skyrace and a silver medal in the vertical kilometer.

Waldal competed at the 2025 World Championship of Ski Mountaineering and won a silver medal in the under-23 sprint race. In January 2026, she was selected to represent Norway at the 2026 Winter Olympics.
