= Thibault Anselmet =

French ski mountaineer (born 1997)

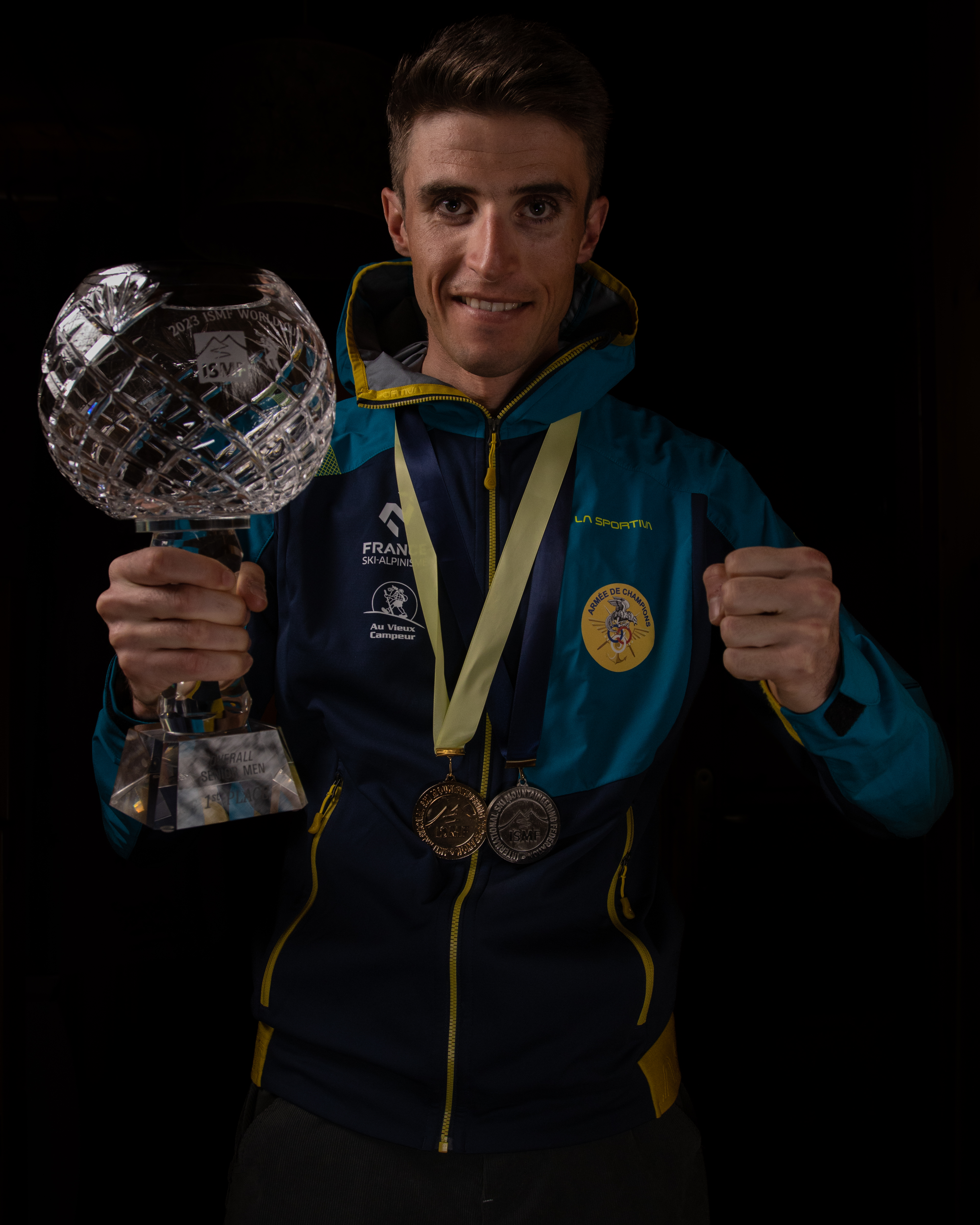
- Anselmet in 2023

Personal information
- Born: 2 November 1997 (age 28) Bonneval-sur-Arc, France

Sport
- Country: France
- Sport: Ski mountaineering
Medal record
Men's ski mountaineering
Representing France
Olympic Games
Gold medal – first place	2026 Milano Cortina	Mixed relay
Bronze medal – third place	2026 Milano Cortina	Sprint
World Championships
Gold medal – first place	2023 Boí Taüll	Mixed relay
Gold medal – first place	2025 Morgins	Mixed relay
Silver medal – second place	2023 Boí Taüll	Sprint race
Silver medal – second place	2025 Morgins	Sprint race
European Championships
Gold medal – first place	2022 Boi Taull	Mixed relay
Silver medal – second place	2024 Flaine / Chamonix	Mixed relay
Bronze medal – third place	2024 Flaine / Chamonix	Individual race

Thibault Anselmet (French pronunciation: [tibo ɑ̃sɛlmɛ]; born 2 November 1997) is a French ski mountaineer. He is a two-time World Champion. He represented France at the 2026 Winter Olympics, where he won a gold medal in the mixed race and bronze medal in the sprint race.

== Career ==
Anselmet made his European Championships debut in 2022 and won a gold medal in the inaugural mixed relay, along with Emily Harrop, with a time of 32:10.

Anselmet made his World Championships debut at the 2023 World Championship of Ski Mountaineering. On the first day of the championships he won a silver medal in the sprint race with a time of 3:14.005. On the final day of the championships he won a gold medal in the mixed team relay, along with Harrop, with a time of 26:46.5.

During the 2023–24 ISMF Ski Mountaineering World Cup, Anselmet won the overall crystal globe with 710 points. He competed at the 2024 European Championships of Ski Mountaineering and won a silver medal in the mixed relay, along with Célia Perillat-Pessey, and a bronze medal in the individual race.

During the 2024–25 ISMF Ski Mountaineering World Cup. he won again the overall crystal globe with 980 points. In March 2025, he competed at the 2025 World Championship of Ski Mountaineering and won a gold medal in the mixed relay, along with Harrop, with a time of 32:44.1. With the win, France earned a quota spot for the discipline at the 2026 Winter Olympics. He also won a silver medal in the sprint race, with a time of 2:49.71.

In January 2026, Anselmet was selected to represent France at the 2026 Winter Olympics. On 19 February 2026, he won a bronze medal in the sprint race with a time of 2:36.34. On 21 February 2026, he won a gold medal in the mixed relay, along with Harrop, with a time of 26:57.44.

== Personal life ==
Anselmet's father, Fabien Anselmet, is a former ski mountaineer and skiing instructor.
