= Ot Ferrer =

Catalan ski mountaineer (born 2002)

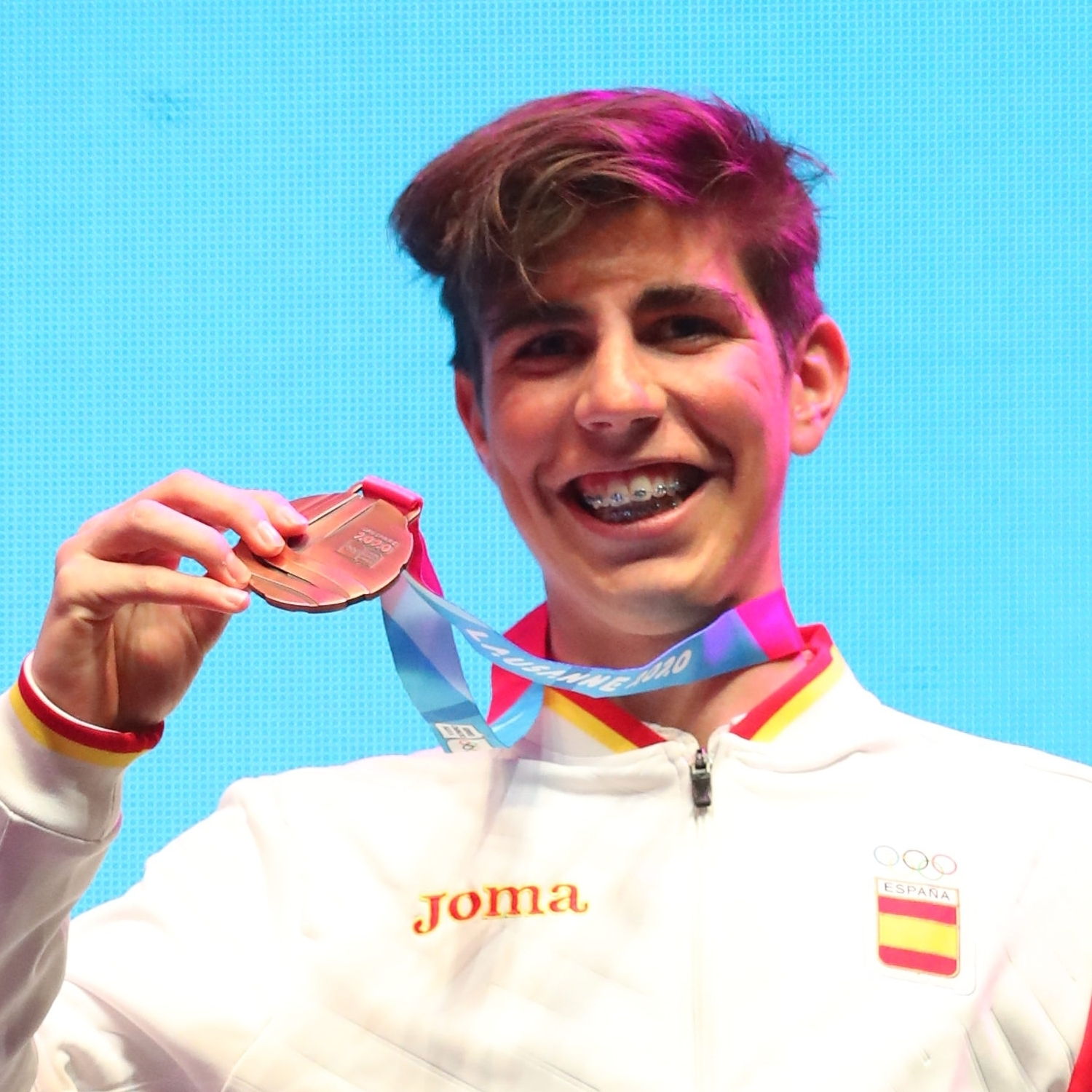
- Ferrer at the 2020 Winter Youth Olympics

Personal information
- Born: Ot Ferrer Martínez; 25 March 2002 (age 24) Berga, Spain
- Height: 1.81 m (5 ft 11 in)
- Weight: 69 kg (152 lb)

Sport
- Country: Spain
- Sport: Ski mountaineering
Medal record
Men's ski mountaineering
Representing Spain
Youth Olympic Games
Bronze medal – third place	2020 Lausanne	Sprint race
Bronze medal – third place	2020 Lausanne	Mixed relay

Ot Ferrer Martínez (born 25 March 2002) is a Spanish ski mountaineer. He represented Spain at the 2026 Winter Olympics.

== Career ==
Ferrer represented Spain at the 2020 Winter Youth Olympics in ski mountaineering, an event making its Youth Olympics debut. He began the Youth Olympics with a bronze medal in the sprint race with a time of 2:43.28. He also won a bronze medal in the mixed relay with a time of 37:13.

He competed at the 2025 World Championship of Ski Mountaineering and won a bronze medal in the under-23 sprint race. He represented Spain at the 2026 Winter Olympics, finishing in 5th place in the final.
