= Ski mountaineering at the 2020 Winter Youth Olympics =

Ski mountaineering at the III Winter Youth Olympic Games
- Venue: Villars-sur-Ollon
- Dates: 10–14 January
- Competitors: 48 from 16 nations

Ski mountaineering at the 2020 Winter Youth Olympics took place in Villars-sur-Ollon, Switzerland from 10 to 14 January 2020.

== Medal summary ==
=== Medal table ===
* Host nation (Switzerland)

| Rank | Nation | Gold | Silver | Bronze | Total |
|---|---|---|---|---|---|
| 1 | Switzerland* | 3 | 2 | 0 | 5 |
| 2 | Italy | 1 | 2 | 0 | 3 |
| 3 | Spain | 1 | 0 | 2 | 3 |
| 4 | France | 0 | 1 | 2 | 3 |
| 5 | Austria | 0 | 0 | 1 | 1 |
| Totals (5 entries) | | 5 | 5 | 5 | 15 |

== Events ==
=== Boys' events ===
| Event | Gold | | Silver | | Bronze | |
|---|---|---|---|---|---|---|
| Boys' individual | Thomas Bussard; Switzerland | 47:49.85 | Robin Bussard; Switzerland | 49:16.54 | Nils Oberauer; Austria | 49:25.65 |
| Boys' sprint | Rocco Baldini; Italy | 2:30.14 | Luca Tomasoni; Italy | 2:38.01 | Ot Ferrer; Spain | 2:43.28 |

=== Girls' events ===
| Event | Gold | | Silver | | Bronze | |
|---|---|---|---|---|---|---|
| Girls' individual | Caroline Ulrich; Switzerland | 58:34.48 | Thibe Deseyn; Switzerland | 59:38.58 | Margot Ravinel; France | 1:00:28.95 |
| Girls' sprint | Maria Costa Díez; Spain | 3:22.45 | Silvia Berra; Italy | 3:24.98 | Margot Ravinel; France | 3:25.85 |

=== Mixed ===
| Event | Gold | | Silver | | Bronze | |
|---|---|---|---|---|---|---|
| Mixed relay | Switzerland; Caroline Ulrich; Thomas Bussard; Thibe Deseyn; Robin Bussard | 35:07 | France; Victoire Berger; Bazil Ducouret; Margot Ravinel; Anselme Damevin | 37:11 | Spain; Maria Costa Díez; Marc Ràdua; Ares Torra Gendrau; Ot Ferrer | 37:13 |

== Qualification ==
=== Qualification summary ===
| NOC | Boys | Girls | Total |
|---|---|---|---|
| Andorra | 1 | | 1 |
| Austria | 2 | 2 | 4 |
| Canada | 1 | 1 | 2 |
| China | 1 | 2 | 3 |
| France | 2 | 2 | 4 |
| Germany | 2 | 2 | 4 |
| Iran | 1 | 1 | 2 |
| Italy | 2 | 2 | 4 |
| Norway | 1 | 1 | 2 |
| Romania | 2 | 2 | 4 |
| Russia | 1 | 1 | 2 |
| Slovakia | 1 | 1 | 2 |
| South Korea | 1 | 1 | 2 |
| Spain | 2 | 2 | 4 |
| Switzerland | 2 | 2 | 4 |
| United States | 2 | 2 | 4 |
| Total: 16 NOCs | 24 | 24 | 48 |
