= Ski mountaineering at the 2020 Winter Youth Olympics – Girls' sprint =

Girls' sprint at the III Winter Youth Olympic Games
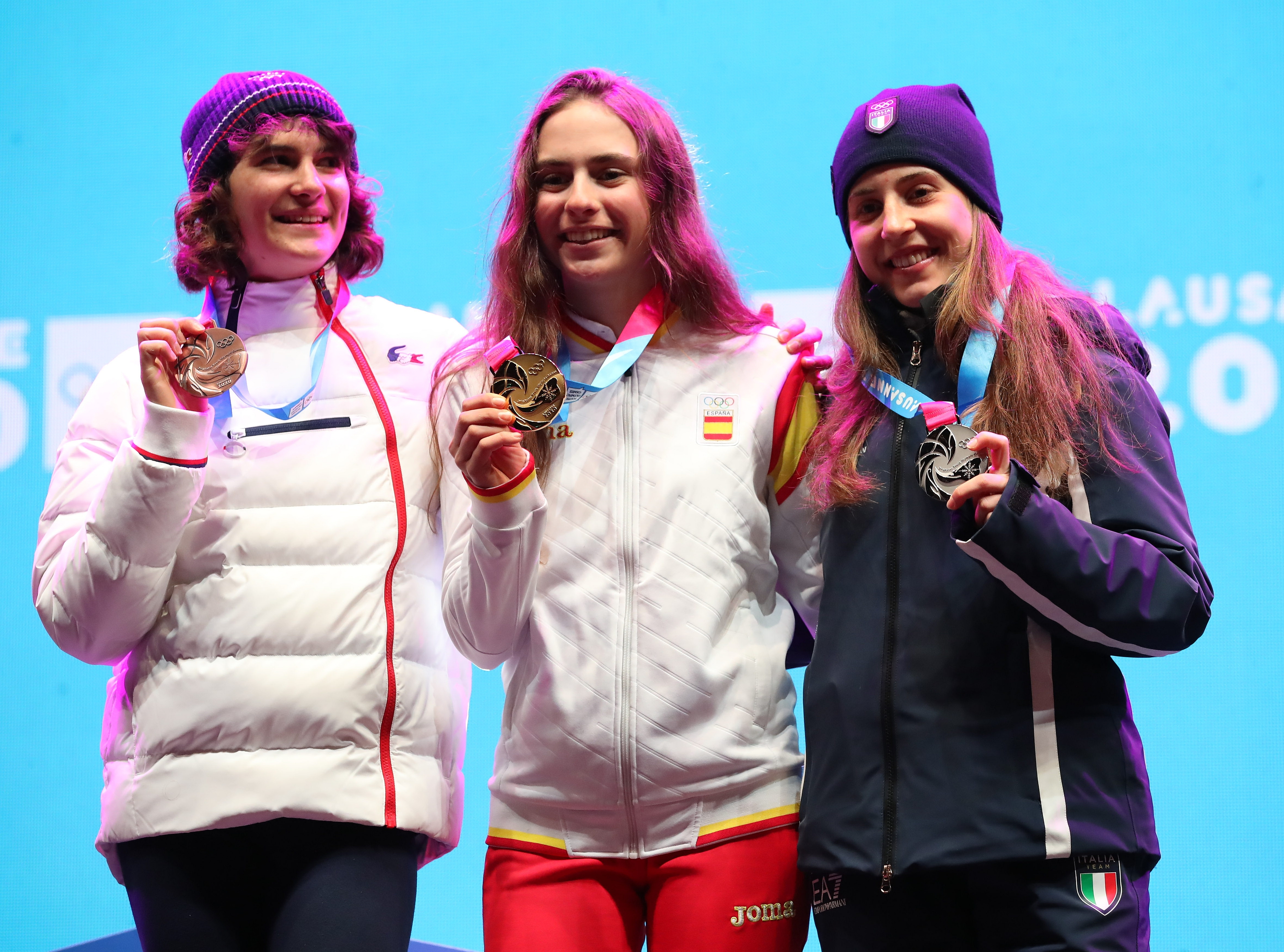
- Venue: Villars Winter Park
- Date: 13 January
- Competitors: 23 from 14 nations

Medalists
1st place, gold medalist(s)		Maria Costa Díez	Spain
2nd place, silver medalist(s)		Silvia Berra	Italy
3rd place, bronze medalist(s)		Margot Ravinel	France

The girls' sprint ski mountaineering competition at the 2020 Winter Youth Olympics was held on 13 January at the Villars Winter Park.

== Results ==
=== Seeding ===
Rank	Bib	Name	Country	Time	Deficit
1	14	Lisa Rettensteiner	Austria	3:34.50	
2	12	Erika Sanelli	Italy	3:36.68	+2.18
3	20	Silvia Berra	Italy	3:36.99	+2.49
4	22	Margot Ravinel	France	3:38.95	+4.45
5	24	Caroline Ulrich	Switzerland	3:39.47	+4.97
6	17	Victoire Berger	France	3:45.26	+10.76
7	21	Suolang Quzhen	China	3:46.62	+12.12
8	9	Yu Jingxuan	China	3:46.90	+12.40
9	16	Maria Costa Díez	Spain	3:48.88	+14.38
10	7	Larisa Daniela Coşofreţ	Romania	3:50.32	+15.82
11	15	Sophia Wessling	Germany	3:50.55	+16.05
12	18	Grace Staberg	United States	3:53.25	+18.75
13	19	Antonia Niedermaier	Germany	3:53.60	+19.10
14	5	Samantha Paisley	United States	3:56.44	+21.94
15	13	Ares Torra Gendrau	Spain	3:57.13	+22.63
16	11	Evgeniia Dolzhenkova	Russia	3:59.17	+24.67
17	23	Thibe Deseyn	Switzerland	4:01.42	+26.92
18	6	Laura Kovárová	Slovakia	4:02.72	+28.22
19	10	Ema Chlepkova	Canada	4:07.71	+33.21
20	1	Lena Leitner-Hölzl	Austria	4:15.51	+41.01
21	8	Anca Alexandra Olaru	Romania	4:19.93	+45.43
22	4	Roksana Saveh Shemshaki	Iran	4:34.34	+59.84
23	3	Kari Forseth	Norway	4:34.43	+59.93
	2	Lim Hyo-shin	South Korea	Did not start	

=== Elimination round ===
The top three finishers from each heat advance to the next round.

==== Quarterfinals ====
Heat 1

Rank	Bib	Name	Country	Time	Deficit	Notes
1	16	Maria Costa Díez	Spain	3:29.20		Q
2	23	Thibe Deseyn	Switzerland	3:31.21	+2.01	Q
3	9	Yu Jingxuan	China	3:34.99	+5.79	Q
4	14	Lisa Rettensteiner	Austria	3:56.25	+27.05	
5	11	Evgeniia Dolzhenkova	Russia	4:05.30	+36.10	

Heat 2

Rank	Bib	Name	Country	Time	Deficit	Notes
1	24	Caroline Ulrich	Switzerland	3:17.99		Q
2	22	Margot Ravinel	France	3:27.96	+9.97	Q
3	10	Ema Chlepkova	Canada	3:33.29	+15.30	Q
4	18	Grace Staberg	United States	3:49.58	+31.59	
5	19	Antonia Niedermaier	Germany	3:58.41	+40.42	
6	4	Roksana Saveh Shemshaki	Iran	4:19.13	+1:01.14	

Heat 3

Rank	Bib	Name	Country	Time	Deficit	Notes
1	21	Suolang Quzhen	China	3:31.21		Q
2	12	Erika Sanelli	Italy	3:31.68	+0.47	Q
3	13	Ares Torra Gendrau	Spain	3:34.91	+3.70	Q
4	7	Larisa Daniela Coşofreţ	Romania	3:45.60	+14.39	
5	6	Laura Kovárová	Slovakia	4:00.30	+29.09	
	3	Kari Forseth	Norway	Did not start		

Heat 4

Rank	Bib	Name	Country	Time	Deficit	Notes
1	20	Silvia Berra	Italy	3:30.10		Q
2	15	Sophia Wessling	Germany	3:35.91	+5.81	Q
3	17	Victoire Berger	France	3:36.55	+6.45	Q
4	5	Samantha Paisley	United States	3:48.55	+18.45	
5	1	Lena Leitner-Hölzl	Austria	4:08.15	+38.05	
6	8	Anca Alexandra Olaru	Romania	4:20.60	+50.50	

==== Semifinals ====
Semifinal 1

Rank	Bib	Name	Country	Time	Deficit	Notes
1	16	Maria Costa Díez	Spain	3:19.35		Q
2	24	Caroline Ulrich	Switzerland	3:20.03	+0.68	Q
3	22	Margot Ravinel	France	3:20.91	+1.56	Q
4	23	Thibe Deseyn	Switzerland	3:25.99	+6.64	
5	9	Yu Jingxuan	China	3:44.43	+25.08	
6	10	Ema Chlepkova	Canada	5:01.65	+1:42.30	

Semifinal 2

Rank	Bib	Name	Country	Time	Deficit	Notes
1	20	Silvia Berra	Italy	3:24.22		Q
2	12	Erika Sanelli	Italy	3:28.19	+3.97	Q
3	21	Suolang Quzhen	China	3:28.88	+4.66	Q
4	15	Sophia Wessling	Germany	3:30.61	+6.39	
5	17	Victoire Berger	France	3:35.75	+11.53	
6	13	Ares Torra Gendrau	Spain	3:42.46	+18.24	

==== Final ====
Rank	Bib	Name	Country	Time	Deficit
1st place, gold medalist(s)	1	Maria Costa Díez	Spain	3:22.45	
2nd place, silver medalist(s)	20	Silvia Berra	Italy	3:24.98	+2.53
3rd place, bronze medalist(s)	22	Margot Ravinel	France	3:25.85	+3.40
4	21	Suolang Quzhen	China	3:33.00	+10.55
5	12	Erika Sanelli	Italy	3:41.29	+18.84
6	24	Caroline Ulrich	Switzerland	3:50.70	+28.25
