= Freestyle skiing at the 2020 Winter Youth Olympics – Girls' big air =

Girls' big air at the III Winter Youth Olympic Games
- Venue: Leysin Park & Pipe
- Dates: 21–22 January
- Competitors: 16 from 8 nations
- Winning points: 171.25

Medalists
1st place, gold medalist(s)		Gu Ailing	China
2nd place, silver medalist(s)		Kirsty Muir	Great Britain
3rd place, bronze medalist(s)		Jennie-Lee Burmansson	Sweden

The girls' big air event in freestyle skiing at the 2020 Winter Youth Olympics took place on 21 and 22 January at the Leysin Park & Pipe.

== Qualification ==
The qualification was held on 21 January at 10:30.

Rank	Bib	Name	Country	Run 1	Run 2	Best	Notes
1	21	Gu Ailing	China	76.33	91.33	91.33	Q
2	4	Jennie-Lee Burmansson	Sweden	85.66	83.00	85.66	Q
3	2	Kirsty Muir	Great Britain	81.33	68.66	81.33	Q
4	6	Jenna Riccomini	United States	77.66	64.66	77.66	Q
5	1	Jade Michaud	France	75.33	19.33	75.33	Q
6	16	Yang Shuorui	China	67.66	24.00	67.66	Q
7	14	Anna Chivina	Russia	58.00	67.33	67.33	Q
8	7	Ivana Mermillod Blondin	France	40.00	67.00	67.00	Q
9	3	Wilma Johansson	Sweden	63.66	65.66	65.66	Q
10	17	Riley Jacobs	United States	60.66	63.00	63.00	Q
11	18	Mia Rennie	Australia	59.33	19.00	59.33	Q
12	15	Anouk Andraska	Switzerland	34.66	58.00	58.00	Q
13	12	Michelle Rageth	Switzerland	55.33	54.00	55.33	
14	8	Alina Brezgina	Russia	49.00	54.00	54.00	
15	13	Abi Harrigan	Australia	52.33	10.66	52.33	
16	10	Montana Osinski	United States	16.33	30.00	30.00	
	5	Elsa Sjöstedt	Switzerland	Did not start			
	9	Ruby Andrews	New Zealand	Did not start			
	11	Skye Clarke	Canada	Did not start			
	19	Antonia Langer	Chile	Did not start			
	20	Rylee Hackler	Canada	Did not start			

== Final ==
The final was held on 22 January at 11:50.

Rank	Start order	Bib	Name	Country	Run 1	Run 2	Run 3	Total
1st place, gold medalist(s)	12	21	Gu Ailing	China	24.25	89.75	81.50	171.25
2nd place, silver medalist(s)	10	2	Kirsty Muir	Great Britain	82.50	78.50	87.50	170.00
3rd place, bronze medalist(s)	11	4	Jennie-Lee Burmansson	Sweden	54.00	75.50	76.25	151.75
4	7	16	Yang Shuorui	China	59.25	17.50	78.00	137.25
5	9	6	Jenna Riccomini	United States	67.75	9.75	60.75	128.50
6	8	1	Jade Michaud	France	46.25	69.50	55.50	125.00
7	4	3	Wilma Johansson	Sweden	51.50	57.00	58.00	115.00
8	3	17	Riley Jacobs	United States	13.50	53.75	52.25	106.00
9	6	14	Anna Chivina	Russia	14.50	50.00	43.75	93.75
10	2	18	Mia Rennie	Australia	11.25	13.75	DNS	25.00
	5	7	Ivana Mermillod Blondin	France	Did not start			
	1	15	Anouk Andraska	Switzerland	Did not start			
