= Freestyle skiing at the 2020 Winter Youth Olympics – Boys' halfpipe =

Boys' halfpipe at the III Winter Youth Olympic Games
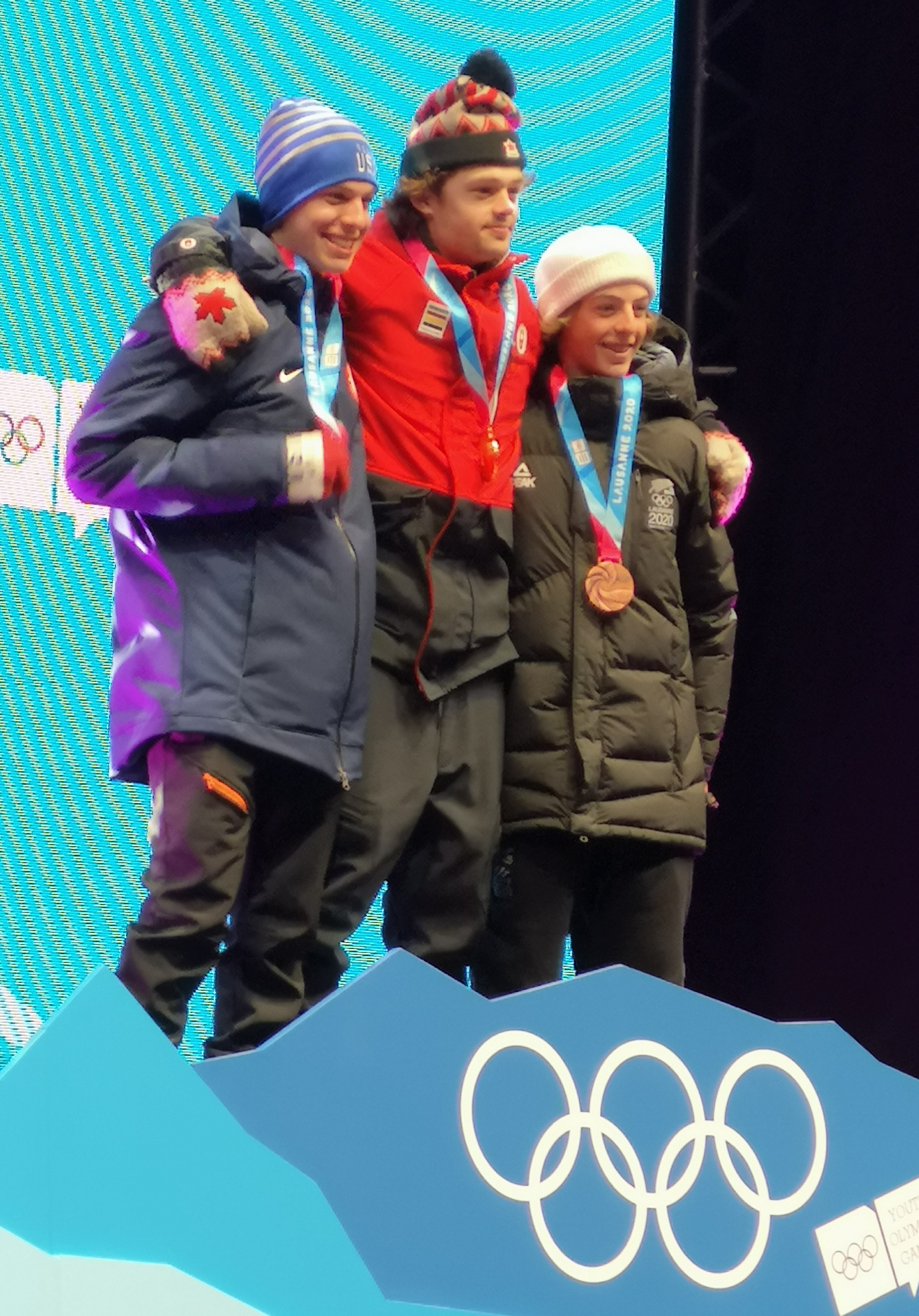
- Venue: Leysin Park & Pipe
- Dates: 21 January
- Competitors: 13 from 7 nations
- Winning points: 94.00

Medalists
1st place, gold medalist(s)		Andrew Longino	Canada
2nd place, silver medalist(s)		Hunter Carey	United States
3rd place, bronze medalist(s)		Luca Harrington	New Zealand

The boys' halfpipe event in freestyle skiing at the 2020 Winter Youth Olympics took place on 21 January at the Leysin Park & Pipe.

== Qualification ==
The qualification was started at 09:30.

Rank	Bib	Name	Country	Run 1	Run 2	Best	Notes
1	9	Luca Harrington	New Zealand	77.66	86.00	86.00	Q
2	2	Hunter Carey	United States	81.66	73.66	81.66	Q
3	1	Andrew Longino	Canada	72.00	76.00	76.00	Q
4	6	Fedor Muralev	Russia	70.00	61.66	70.00	Q
5	5	Sun Jingbo	China	66.66	68.66	68.66	Q
6	3	Li Songsheng	China	61.66	54.00	61.66	Q
7	15	Max McDonald	New Zealand	57.66	36.00	57.66	Q
8	8	Steven Kahnert	Canada	56.00	55.33	56.00	Q
9	4	Connor Ladd	United States	5.00	54.66	54.66	Q
10	7	Leonid Frolov	Russia	53.33	53.00	53.33	Q
11	11	Nicola Bolinger	Switzerland	36.33	50.33	50.33	
12	12	Hong Jae-won	South Korea	39.00	37.33	39.00	
13	13	Her Seong-uk	South Korea	33.00	19.33	33.00	
	10	Hunter Henderson	United States	Did not start			
	14	Fantin Ciompi	Switzerland	Did not start			

== Final ==
The final was started at 11:10.

Rank	Start order	Bib	Name	Country	Run 1	Run 2	Run 3	Best
1st place, gold medalist(s)	8	1	Andrew Longino	Canada	87.66	90.66	94.00	94.00
2nd place, silver medalist(s)	9	2	Hunter Carey	United States	84.00	86.00	30.66	86.00
3rd place, bronze medalist(s)	10	9	Luca Harrington	New Zealand	80.33	79.66	80.66	80.66
4	4	15	Max McDonald	New Zealand	76.00	48.33	56.00	76.00
5	2	4	Connor Ladd	United States	33.00	73.33	53.33	73.33
6	6	5	Sun Jingbo	China	69.66	54.66	66.66	69.66
7	7	6	Fedor Muralev	Russia	41.33	62.00	67.33	67.33
8	3	8	Steven Kahnert	Canada	24.00	65.66	24.66	65.66
9	5	3	Li Songsheng	China	64.33	39.00	35.66	64.33
10	1	7	Leonid Frolov	Russia	55.66	30.00	51.00	55.66
