= Freestyle skiing at the 2020 Winter Youth Olympics – Girls' halfpipe =

Girls' halfpipe at the III Winter Youth Olympic Games
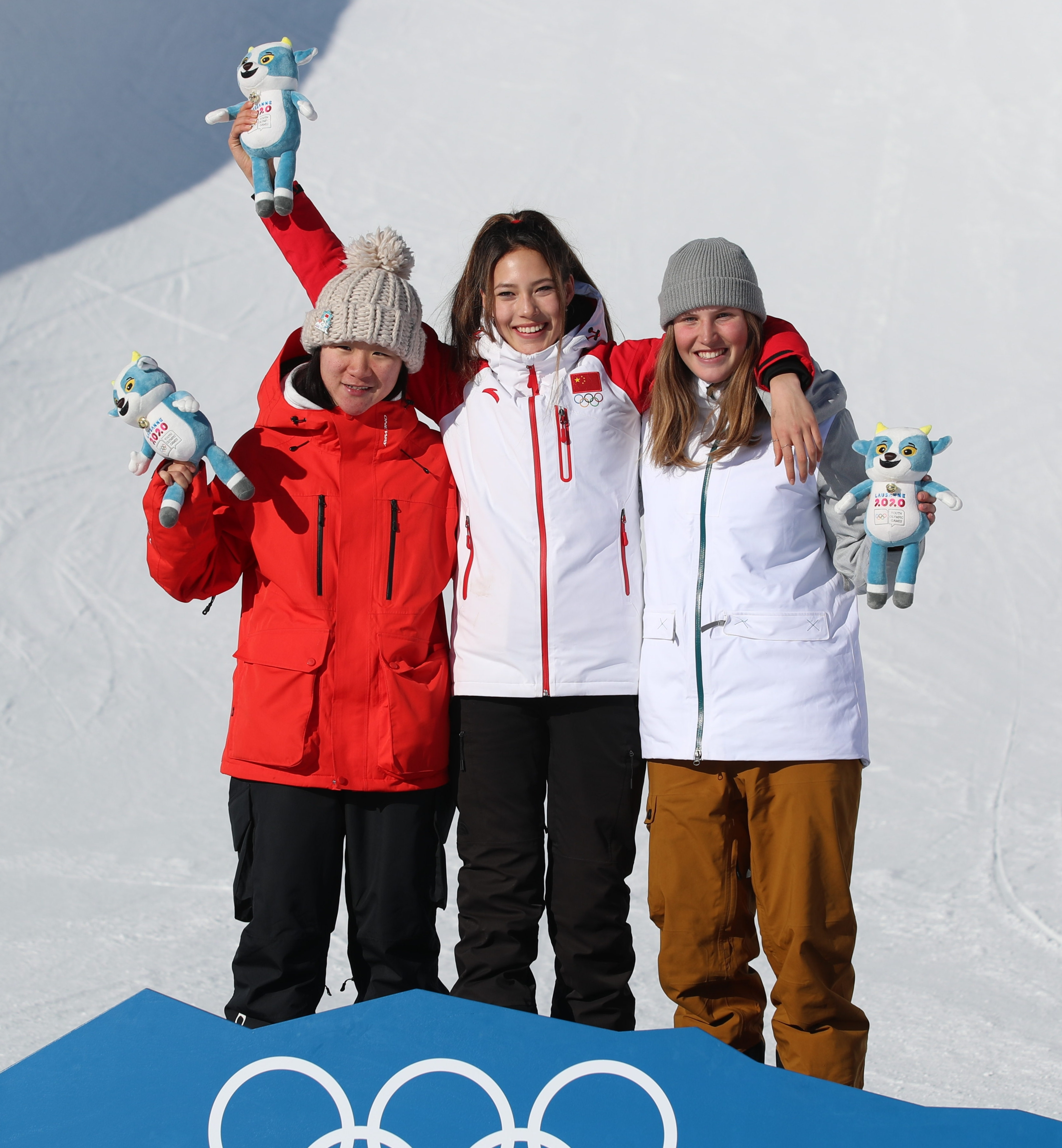
- Venue: Leysin Park & Pipe
- Dates: 20 January
- Competitors: 14 from 8 nations
- Winning points: 93.00

Medalists
1st place, gold medalist(s)		Gu Ailing	China
2nd place, silver medalist(s)		Li Fanghui	China
3rd place, bronze medalist(s)		Hanna Faulhaber	United States

The girls' halfpipe event in freestyle skiing at the 2020 Winter Youth Olympics took place on 20 January at the Leysin Park & Pipe.

== Qualification ==
The qualification was started at 09:30.

Rank	Bib	Name	Country	Run 1	Run 2	Best	Notes
1	4	Gu Ailing	China	86.33	90.00	90.00	Q
2	5	Li Fanghui	China	83.00	84.66	84.66	Q
3	6	Hanna Faulhaber	United States	78.66	80.33	80.33	Q
4	2	Wu Meng	China	75.33	76.66	76.66	Q
5	3	Riley Jacobs	United States	69.00	67.33	69.00	Q
6	9	Michelle Rageth	Switzerland	64.00	32.00	64.00	Q
7	1	Ruby Andrews	New Zealand	61.66	DNS	61.66	Q
8	10	Emma Morozumi	Canada	55.66	18.66	55.66	Q
9	7	Daria Tatalina	Russia	48.00	53.66	53.66	
10	15	Abi Harrigan	Australia	50.33	52.66	52.66	
11	11	Akane Nakata	Japan	43.33	47.00	47.00	
12	13	Jenna Riccomini	United States	45.33	46.00	46.00	
13	8	Rylee Hackler	Canada	39.00	39.66	39.66	
14	12	Yuna Koga	Japan	33.66	38.33	38.33	
	14	Mia Rennie	Australia	Did not start			

== Final ==
The final was started at 11:10.

Rank	Start order	Bib	Name	Country	Run 1	Run 2	Run 3	Best
1st place, gold medalist(s)	8	4	Gu Ailing	China	90.66	93.00	90.00	93.00
2nd place, silver medalist(s)	7	5	Li Fanghui	China	84.00	85.66	21.66	85.66
3rd place, bronze medalist(s)	6	6	Hanna Faulhaber	United States	63.33	77.33	71.33	77.33
4	5	2	Wu Meng	China	75.33	9.66	10.00	75.33
5	2	1	Ruby Andrews	New Zealand	66.00	64.33	DNS	66.00
6	4	3	Riley Jacobs	United States	60.33	51.33	41.66	60.33
7	3	9	Michelle Rageth	Switzerland	55.00	59.66	57.33	59.66
8	1	10	Emma Morozumi	Canada	51.00	52.33	44.33	52.33

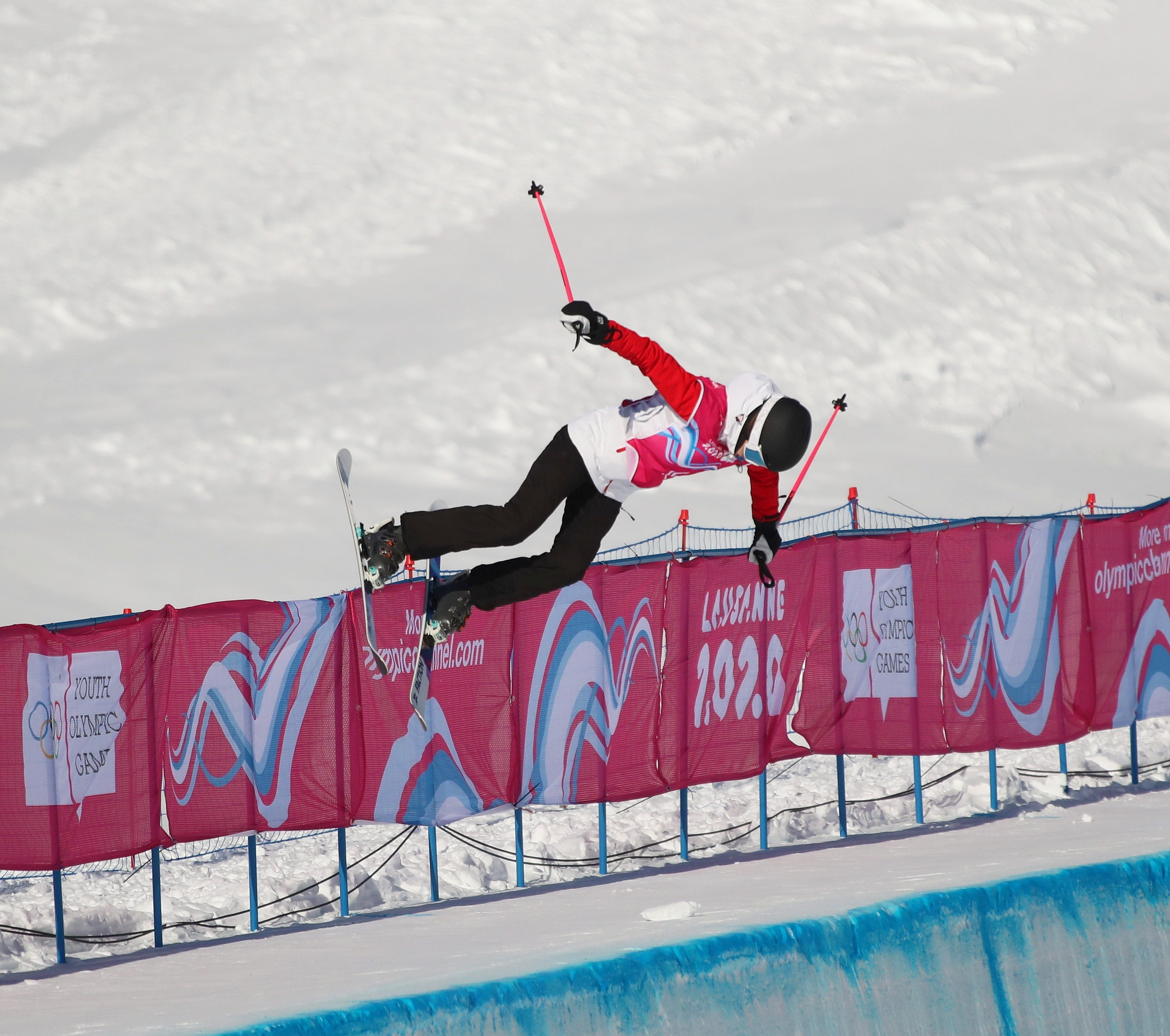
Gu Ailing

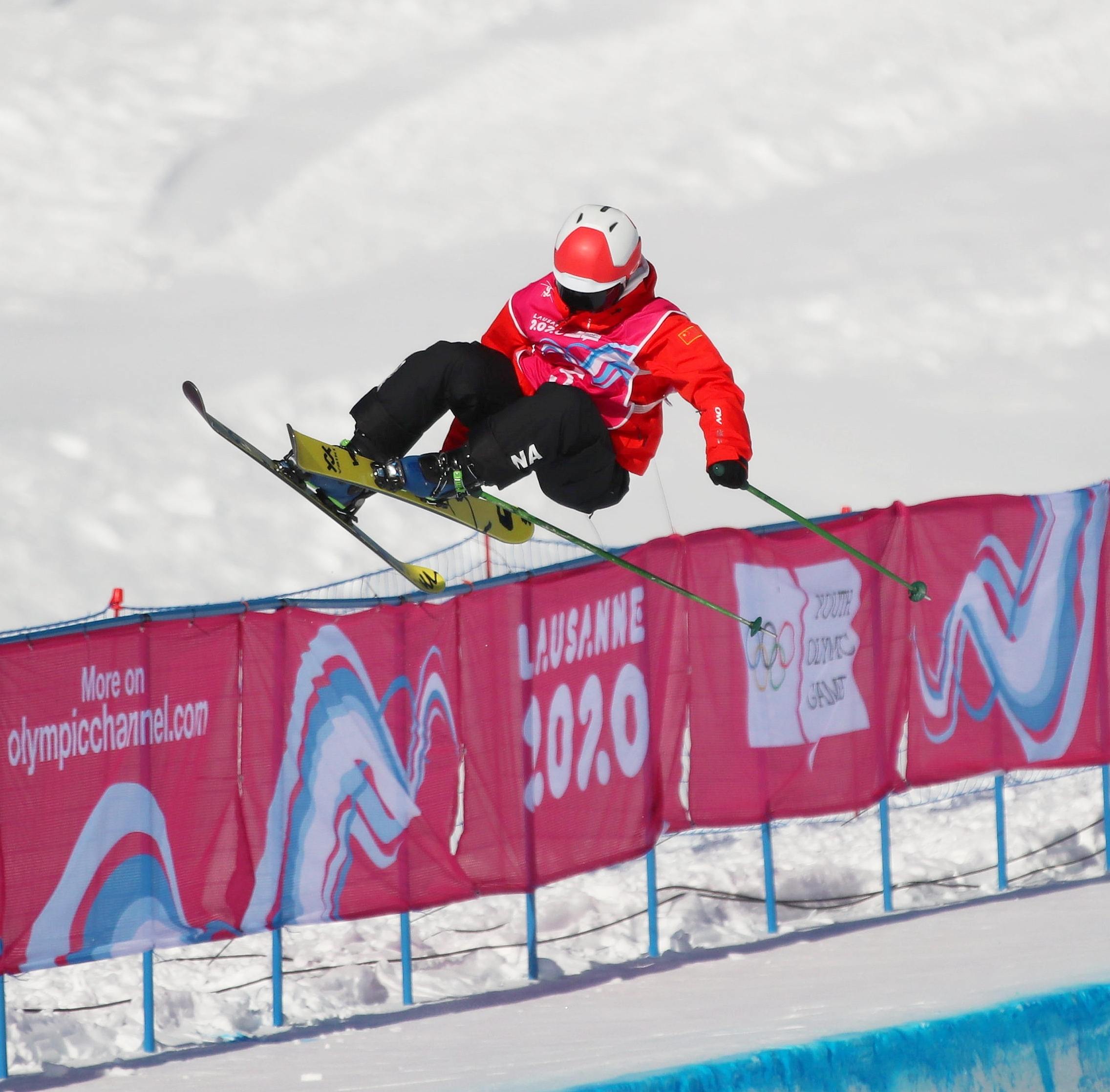
Li Fanghui

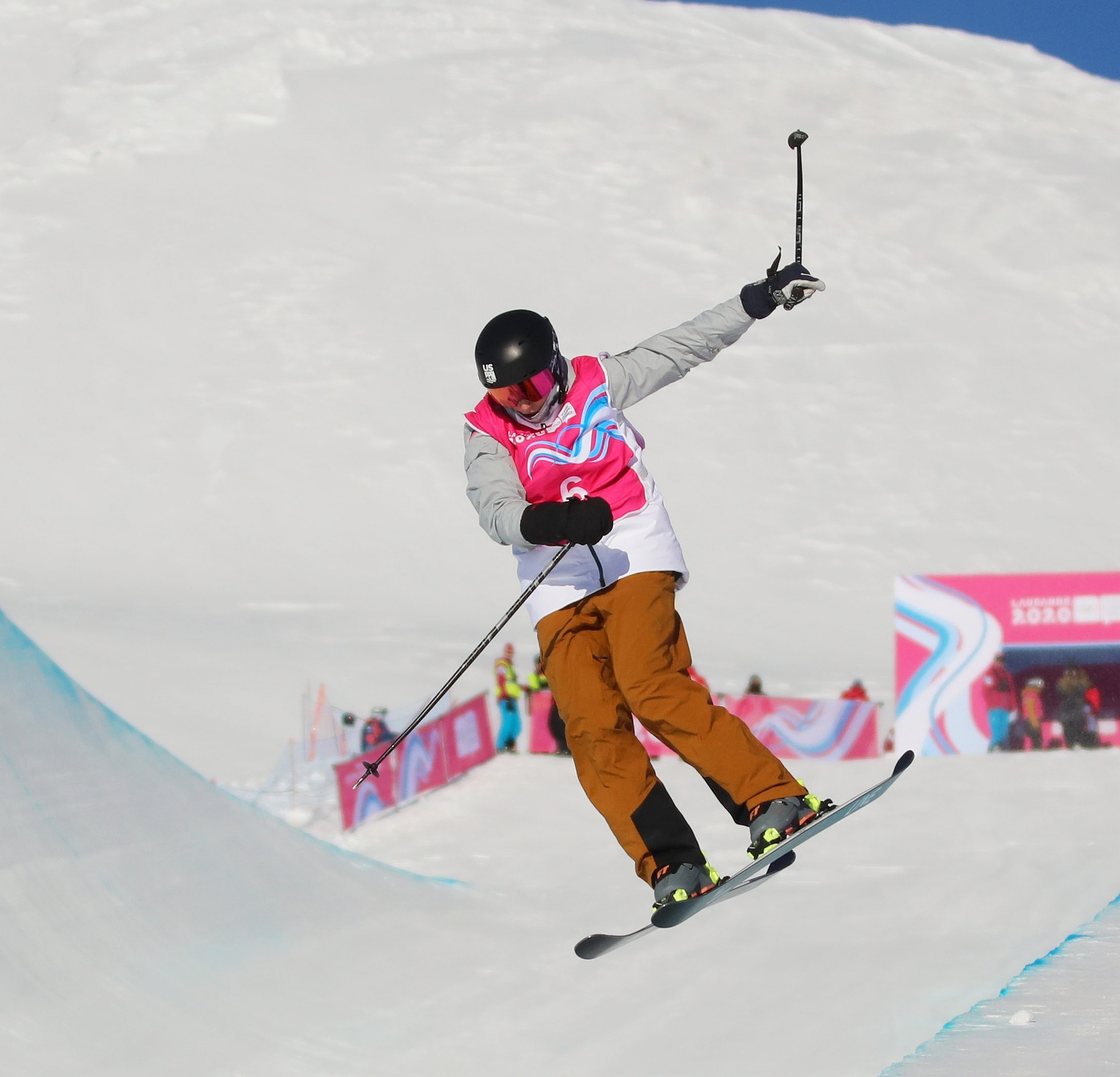
Hanna Faulhaber
