= Ski mountaineering at the 2020 Winter Youth Olympics – Girls' individual =

Girls' individual at the III Winter Youth Olympic Games
- Venue: Villars Winter Park
- Date: 10 January
- Competitors: 23 from 15 nations
- Winning time: 58:34.48

Medalists
1st place, gold medalist(s)		Caroline Ulrich	Switzerland
2nd place, silver medalist(s)		Thibe Deseyn	Switzerland
3rd place, bronze medalist(s)		Margot Ravinel	France

The girls' individual ski mountaineering competition at the 2020 Winter Youth Olympics was held on 10 January at the Villars Winter Park. The race was contested over 2 laps on a 3.6 km course, making the total distance 7.2 km.

== Results ==
The race was started at 10:30.

Rank	Bib	Name	Country	Time	Deficit
1st place, gold medalist(s)	1	Caroline Ulrich	Switzerland	58:34.48	
2nd place, silver medalist(s)	2	Thibe Deseyn	Switzerland	59:38.58	+1:04.10
3rd place, bronze medalist(s)	3	Margot Ravinel	France	1:00:28.95	+1:54.47
4	23	Suolang Quzhen	China	1:02:08.99	+3:34.51
5	4	Silvia Berra	Italy	1:02:43.26	+4:08.78
6	21	Antonia Niedermaier	Germany	1:02:47.57	+4:13.09
7	6	Grace Staberg	United States	1:03:21.24	+4:46.76
8	9	Victoire Berger	France	1:05:29.14	+6:54.66
9	5	Maria Costa Díez	Spain	1:05:52.32	+7:17.84
10	7	Sophia Wessling	Germany	1:06:21.10	+7:46.62
11	16	Lisa Rettensteiner	Austria	1:06:39.71	+8:05.23
12	8	Ares Torra Gendrau	Spain	1:06:50.06	+8:15.58
13	14	Erika Sanelli	Italy	1:07:19.98	+8:45.50
14	22	Evgeniia Dolzhenkova	Russia	1:08:00.63	+9:26.15
15	11	Ema Chlepkova	Canada	1:10:10.95	+11:36.47
16	13	Yu Jingxuan	China	1:12:16.75	+13:42.27
17	17	Anca Alexandra Olaru	Romania	1:15:38.94	+17:04.46
18	18	Larisa Daniela Coşofreţ	Romania	1:16:19.64	+17:45.16
19	10	Laura Kovárová	Slovakia	1:17:45.56	+19:11.08
20	12	Samantha Paisley	United States	1:18:40.08	+20:05.60
21	24	Roksana Saveh Shemshaki	Iran	1:22:25.42	+23:50.94
22	19	Kari Forseth	Norway	1:23:05.64	+24:31.16
	20	Lim Hyo-shin	South Korea	Did not finish	
