= Snowboarding at the 2020 Winter Youth Olympics – Boys' halfpipe =

Boys' halfpipe at the III Winter Youth Olympic Games
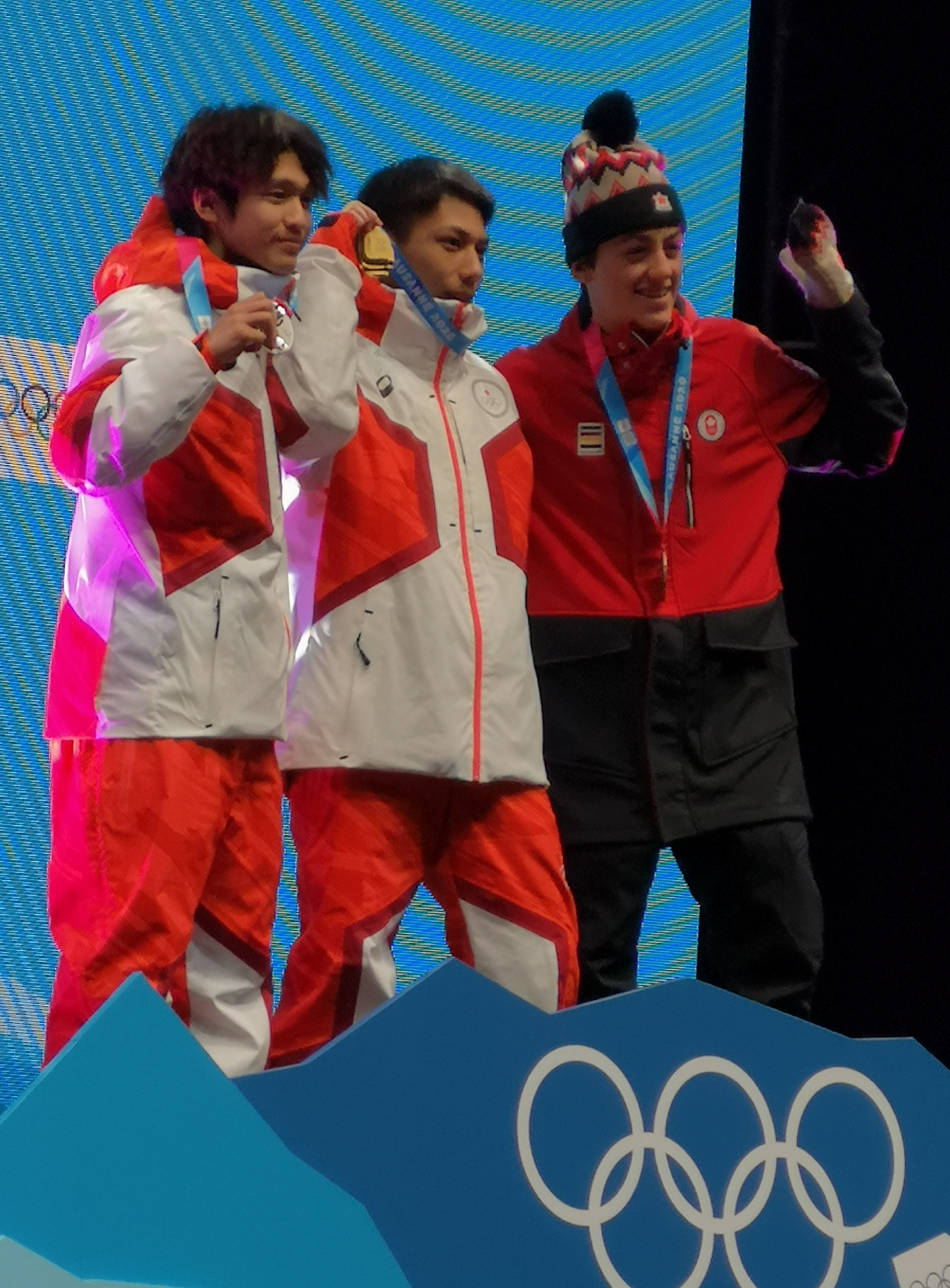
- Venue: Leysin Park & Pipe
- Dates: 21 January
- Competitors: 17 from 10 nations
- Winning points: 97.33

Medalists
| 1st place, gold medalist(s) | | Ruka Hirano | Japan |
| 2nd place, silver medalist(s) | | Kaishu Hirano | Japan |
| 3rd place, bronze medalist(s) | | Liam Brearley | Canada |

The boys' halfpipe event in snowboarding at the 2020 Winter Youth Olympics took place on 21 January at the Leysin Park and Pipe.

== Qualification ==
The qualification was started at 09:30.

| Rank | Bib | Name | Country | Run 1 | Run 2 | Best | Notes |
|---|---|---|---|---|---|---|---|
| 1 | 15 | Ruka Hirano | Japan | 93.00 | 97.33 | 97.33 | Q |
| 2 | 2 | Gian Biele | Switzerland | 79.00 | 86.66 | 86.66 | Q |
| 3 | 4 | Kaishu Hirano | Japan | 84.66 | 23.00 | 84.66 | Q |
| 4 | 12 | Liam Brearley | Canada | 80.66 | 83.33 | 83.33 | Q |
| 5 | 13 | Kolman LeCroy | United States | 18.33 | 82.33 | 82.33 | Q |
| 6 | 8 | Lee Hyun-jun | South Korea | 82.00 | 38.00 | 82.00 | Q |
| 7 | 9 | Wang Xin | China | 74.33 | 59.33 | 74.33 | Q |
| 8 | 17 | Jack Coyne | United States | 69.00 | 64.00 | 69.00 | Q |
| 9 | 5 | Eliot Golay | Switzerland | 52.33 | 66.00 | 66.00 | Q |
| 10 | 6 | Yaroslav Lenchevskiy | Russia | 60.00 | 63.00 | 63.00 | Q |
| 11 | 7 | Nikita Abozovik | Russia | 55.66 | 28.33 | 55.66 | |
| 12 | 11 | Mark Schrott | Germany | 52.66 | 46.00 | 52.66 | |
| 13 | 3 | Liam Gill | Canada | 15.00 | 50.00 | 50.00 | |
| 14 | 14 | Seth Strobel | Canada | 16.33 | 45.00 | 45.00 | |
| 15 | 1 | Sunny Steele | Australia | 37.33 | 36.33 | 37.33 | |
| 16 | 10 | Valentín Moreno | Argentina | 30.66 | 34.33 | 34.33 | |
| 17 | 18 | Lee Joon-sik | South Korea | 27.00 | DNS | 27.00 | |
| | 16 | Valtteri Kautonen | Finland | Did not start | | | |

== Final ==
The final was started at 12:55.

| Rank | Start order | Bib | Name | Country | Run 1 | Run 2 | Run 3 | Best |
|---|---|---|---|---|---|---|---|---|
| 1st place, gold medalist(s) | 10 | 15 | Ruka Hirano | Japan | 94.66 | 97.33 | 30.66 | 97.33 |
| 2nd place, silver medalist(s) | 8 | 4 | Kaishu Hirano | Japan | 91.00 | 95.66 | 37.33 | 95.66 |
| 3rd place, bronze medalist(s) | 7 | 12 | Liam Brearley | Canada | 82.00 | 79.00 | 32.66 | 82.00 |
| 4 | 5 | 8 | Lee Hyun-jun | South Korea | 77.00 | 23.66 | 54.00 | 77.00 |
| 5 | 3 | 17 | Jack Coyne | United States | 70.33 | 53.00 | 76.00 | 76.00 |
| 6 | 9 | 2 | Gian Biele | Switzerland | 35.66 | 43.33 | 74.66 | 74.66 |
| 7 | 4 | 9 | Wang Xin | China | 67.33 | 73.00 | 13.66 | 73.00 |
| 8 | 2 | 5 | Eliot Golay | Switzerland | 65.00 | 35.33 | 59.33 | 65.00 |
| 9 | 1 | 6 | Yaroslav Lenchevskiy | Russia | 60.00 | 63.33 | 57.00 | 63.33 |
| 10 | 6 | 13 | Kolman LeCroy | United States | 15.66 | 42.33 | 12.33 | 42.33 |
