= Andrew Longino =

Andrew Longino may refer to

- Andrew H. Longino, American politician
- Andrew Longino (freestyle skier)
