= United States at the 2020 Winter Youth Olympics =

- Flag of the United States
- IOC code: USA
- NOC: United States Olympic Committee
- Website: www.teamusa.org

in Lausanne
- Competitors: 96 in 16 sports
- Medals Ranked 11th: Gold 2 Silver 3 Bronze 6 Total 11

Winter Youth Olympics appearances (overview)
- 2012; 2016; 2020; 2024

The United States competed at the 2020 Winter Youth Olympics in Lausanne, Switzerland from 9 to 22 January 2020.

== Medalists ==
Medals awarded to participants of mixed-NOC teams are represented in italics. These medals are not counted towards the individual NOC medal tally.

Medal	Name	Sport	Event	Date
Gold	Kiernan Fagan	Freestyle skiing	Boys' slopestyle	20 January
Gold	Dusty Henricksen	Snowboarding	Boys' slopestyle	20 January
Gold	Jonathan So	Short track speed skating	Mixed NOC team relay	22 January
Silver	Kate Wang; Cate Fleming / Jedidah Isbell	Figure skating	Team trophy	15 January
Silver	Hunter Carey	Freestyle skiing	Boys' halfpipe	21 January
Silver	Kiernan Fagan	Freestyle skiing	Boys' big air	22 January
Silver	United States men's national under-16 ice hockey team: Dylan Silverstein; Hunter Brzustewicz; Seamus Casey; Ryan Chesley; Vinny Borgesi; Lane Hutson; Tyler Duke; Maddox Fleming; Cutter Gauthier; Isaac Howard; Gavin Brindley; Rutger McGroarty; Frank Nazar; Jimmy Snuggerud; Charlie Stramel; Cruz Lucius; Arthur Smith	Ice hockey	Boys' tournament	22 January
Bronze	Katarina Wolfkostin / Jeffrey Chen	Figure skating	Ice dancing	13 January
Bronze	Jonathan Tobon	Speed skating	Boys' 1500 metres	13 January
Bronze	Jonathan Tobon	Speed skating	Mixed team sprint	15 January
Bronze	Hanna Faulhaber	Freestyle skiing	Girls' halfpipe	20 January
Bronze	Hunter Henderson	Freestyle skiing	Boys' slopestyle	20 January
Bronze	Kendall Kramer	Cross-country skiing	Girls' 5 kilometres classic	21 January
Bronze	Will Koch	Cross-country skiing	Boys' 10 kilometres classic	21 January

== Alpine skiing ==
Boys

Athlete	Event	Run 1		Run 2		Total	
Athlete	Event	Time	Rank	Time	Rank	Time	Rank
Daniel Gillis	Super-G	—N/a				56.32	25
Daniel Gillis	Combined	56.32	25	36.42	26	1:32.74	19
Daniel Gillis	Giant slalom	DNF					
Daniel Gillis	Slalom	39.82	27	41.82	21	1:21.64	20
Maxx Parys	Super-G	—N/a				59.01	46
Maxx Parys	Combined	59.01	46	36.13	24	1:35.14	29
Maxx Parys	Giant slalom	DNF					
Maxx Parys	Slalom	47.43	47	DNF			
Trent Pennington	Super-G	—N/a				55.88	20
Trent Pennington	Combined	55.88	20	DNF			
Trent Pennington	Giant slalom	1:05.12	14	1:06.20	19	2:11.32	17
Trent Pennington	Slalom	DNF					

Girls

Athlete	Event	Run 1		Run 2		Total	
Athlete	Event	Time	Rank	Time	Rank	Time	Rank
Lauren Macuga	Super-G	—N/a				DNF	
Lauren Macuga	Combined	DNF					
Emma Resnick	Super-G	—N/a				57.21	11
Emma Resnick	Combined	57.21	11	39.00	14	1:36.21	12
Emma Resnick	Giant slalom	1:06.37	12	1:02.79	1	2:09.16	4
Emma Resnick	Slalom	46.97	14	DNF			
Nicola Rountree-Williams	Super-G	—N/a				DNF	
Nicola Rountree-Williams	Combined	DNF					
Nicola Rountree-Williams	Giant slalom	1:05.95	8	1:04.06	8	2:10.01	8
Nicola Rountree-Williams	Slalom	47.29	18	45.84	13	1:33.13	13

Mixed

Athlete	Event	Round of 16	Quarterfinals	Semifinals	Final / BM	
Athlete	Event	Opposition Result	Opposition Result	Opposition Result	Opposition Result	Rank
Nicola Rountree-Williams; Daniel Gillis	Team	Argentina; W 3–1	France; L 2–2*	Did not advance		6

== Biathlon ==
Boys

Athlete	Event	Time	Misses	Rank
Etienne Bordes	Sprint	21:45.2	2 (1+1)	34
Etienne Bordes	Individual	42:39.8	8 (2+3+2+1)	76
Van Ledger	Sprint	23:49.6	5 (1+4)	75
Van Ledger	Individual	41:03.5	6 (3+2+0+1)	59
Cale Woods	Sprint	23:15.3	4 (2+2)	64
Cale Woods	Individual	41:24.3	6 (0+3+0+3)	64

Girls

Athlete	Event	Time	Misses	Rank
Kaisa Bosek	Sprint	21:38.0	2 (1+1)	55
Kaisa Bosek	Individual	36:30.8	2 (0+0+2+0)	18
Maja Lapkass	Sprint	22:25.8	4 (2+2)	70
Maja Lapkass	Individual	41:38.3	10 (1+4+2+3)	69
Margaret Madigan	Sprint	22:07.4	2 (1+1)	65
Margaret Madigan	Individual	39:59.8	8 (3+2+1+2)	55

Mixed

Athletes	Event	Time	Misses	Rank
Kaisa Bosek; Van Ledger	Single mixed relay	48:30.2	4+11	21
Kaisa Bosek; Margaret Madigan; Etienne Bordes; Cale Woods	Mixed relay	1:21:20.9	3+15	19

== Bobsleigh ==
Athlete	Event	Run 1		Run 2		Total	
Athlete	Event	Time	Rank	Time	Rank	Time	Rank
Bridger Stone	Boys'	1:13.47	6	1:13.33	10	2:26.80	9
Maddy Cohen	Girls'	1:16.06	15	1:15.91	15	2:31.97	14

== Cross-country skiing ==
Boys

Athlete	Event	Qualification		Quarterfinal		Semifinal		Final	
Athlete	Event	Time	Rank	Time	Rank	Time	Rank	Time	Rank
Brian Bushey	10 km classic	—N/a						28:12.6	13
Brian Bushey	Free sprint	3:33.18	44	Did not advance					
Brian Bushey	Cross-country cross	4:35.68	28 Q	—N/a		4:35.33	9	Did not advance	
Will Koch	10 km classic	—N/a						27:29.5	3rd place, bronze medalist(s)
Will Koch	Free sprint	3:22.98	17 Q	3:26.22	4	Did not advance			
Will Koch	Cross-country cross	4:17.33	3 Q	—N/a		4:17.07	1 Q	4:15.07	4
Kai Mittelsteadt	10 km classic	—N/a						30:38.0	48
Kai Mittelsteadt	Free sprint	DNS							
Kai Mittelsteadt	Cross-country cross	4:44.09	47	Did not advance					

Girls

Athlete	Event	Qualification		Quarterfinal		Semifinal		Final	
Athlete	Event	Time	Rank	Time	Rank	Time	Rank	Time	Rank
Kendall Kramer	5 km classic	—N/a						14:36.3	3rd place, bronze medalist(s)
Kendall Kramer	Free sprint	2:54.44	22 Q	2:55.80	5	Did not advance			
Kendall Kramer	Cross-country cross	5:09.65	14 Q	—N/a		5:08.51	6	Did not advance	
Sydney Palmer-Leger	5 km classic	—N/a						14:43.3	4
Sydney Palmer-Leger	Free sprint	2:52.98	18 Q	2:55.53	2 Q	2:52.17	6	Did not advance	
Sydney Palmer-Leger	Cross-country cross	5:01.58	8 Q	—N/a		4:52.62	2 Q	4:49.31	4
Nina Seemann	5 km classic	—N/a						16:21.1	35
Nina Seemann	Free sprint	3:01.25	35	Did not advance					
Nina Seemann	Cross-country cross	5:10.26	16 Q	—N/a		5:06.07	6	Did not advance	

== Curling ==
United States qualified a mixed team of four athletes.

=== Mixed team ===
Summary

Team	Event	Group stage						Quarterfinal	Semifinal	Final / BM	
Team	Event	Opposition Score	Opposition Score	Opposition Score	Opposition Score	Opposition Score	Rank	Opposition Score	Opposition Score	Opposition Score	Rank
Ethan Hebert; Kaitlin Murphy; Charlie Thompson; Alina Tschumakow	Mixed team	Italy; L 3 – 7	Latvia; W 8 – 0	Japan; L 2 – 8	Czech Republic; L 4 – 6	Sweden; L 3 – 8	5	Did not advance			19

=== Mixed doubles ===
Summary

Athletes	Event	Round of 48	Round of 24	Round of 12	Round of 6	Semifinals	Final / BM	
Athletes	Event	Opposition Result	Opposition Result	Opposition Result	Opposition Result	Opposition Result	Opposition Result	Rank
Malin da Ros (SUI); Ethan Hebert (USA)	Mixed doubles	Lasmane (LAT) / Becker (NZL); L 4–10	Did not advance					
Kaitlin Murphy (USA); Jaedon Neuert (CAN)	Mixed doubles	Farries (GBR) / Polat (TUR); W 8–4	Gregori (SLO) / Winz (SUI); L 6–8	Did not advance				
Kim Sutor (GER); Charlie Thompson (USA)	Mixed doubles	Vergnaud (FRA) / Burås (NOR); L 5–7	Did not advance					
Alina Tschumakow (USA); Francesco De Zanna (ITA)	Mixed doubles	Park (KOR) / Kamiński (POL); L 7–8	Did not advance					

== Figure skating ==
8 American figure skaters achieved quota places for the USA delegation based on the results of the 2019 World Junior Figure Skating Championships.

Singles

Athlete	Event	SP		FS		Total	
Athlete	Event	Points	Rank	Points	Rank	Points	Rank
Liam Kapeikis	Boys' singles	49.57	14	112.02	9	161.59	10
Audrey Shin	Girls' singles	60.36	7	116.31	7	176.67	7
Kate Wang	Girls' singles	54.75	10	86.42	14	141.17	13

Couples

Athletes	Event	SP/SD		FS/FD		Total	
Athletes	Event	Points	Rank	Points	Rank	Points	Rank
Cate Fleming / Jedidah Isbell	Pairs	49.87	4	88.10	6	137.97	6
Katarina Wolfkostin / Jeffrey Chen	Ice dancing	57.02	5	95.41	3	152.43	3rd place, bronze medalist(s)

Mixed NOC team trophy

Athletes	Event	Free skate/Free dance					
Athletes	Event	Ice dance	Pairs	Girls	Boys	Total	
Athletes	Event	Points Team points	Points Team points	Points Team points	Points Team points	Points	Rank
Team Determination; Katarina Wolfkostin / Jeffrey Chen (USA); Brooke McIntosh / Brandon Toste (CAN); Nella Pelkonen (FIN); Cha Young-hyun (KOR)	Team trophy	90.41; 5	96.73; 5	91.27; 2	133.13; 6	18	4
Team Focus; Sofya Tyutyunina / Alexander Shustitskiy (RUS); Cate Fleming / Jedidah Isbell (USA); Kate Wang (USA); Yuma Kagiyama (JPN)	Team trophy	96.39; 7	91.34; 3	101.84; 4	157.62; 8	22	2nd place, silver medalist(s)
Team Hope; Miku Makita / Tyler Gunara (CAN); Letizia Roscher / Luis Schuster (GER); Maïa Mazzara (FRA); Liam Kapeikis (USA)	Team trophy	89.87; 4	78.24; 1	103.36; 5	117.28; 5	15	8

== Freestyle skiing ==
Ski cross

Athlete	Event	Group heats		Semifinal	Final
Athlete	Event	Points	Rank	Position	Position
Eli Derrick	Boys' ski cross	12	10	Did not advance	

Slopestyle & Big Air

Athlete	Event	Qualification				Final				
Athlete	Event	Run 1	Run 2	Best	Rank	Run 1	Run 2	Run 3	Best	Rank
Hunter Carey	Boys' halfpipe	81.66	73.66	81.66	2 Q	84.00	86.00	30.66	86.00	2nd place, silver medalist(s)
Kiernan Fagan	Boys' big air	79.00	25.00	79.00	6 Q	88.75	94.25	87.00	183.00	2nd place, silver medalist(s)
Kiernan Fagan	Boys' slopestyle	11.66	83.00	83.00	3 Q	87.33	90.66	35.33	90.66	1st place, gold medalist(s)
Hunter Henderson	Boys' big air	87.50	72.50	87.50	1 Q	89.50	43.50	85.75	175.25	4
Hunter Henderson	Boys' halfpipe	DNS								
Hunter Henderson	Boys' slopestyle	80.33	3.66	80.33	4 Q	32.00	88.66	83.66	88.66	3rd place, bronze medalist(s)
Connor Ladd	Boys' halfpipe	5.00	54.66	54.66	9 Q	33.00	73.33	53.33	73.33	5
Hannah Faulhaber	Girls' halfpipe	78.66	80.33	80.33	3 Q	63.33	77.33	71.33	77.33	3rd place, bronze medalist(s)
Riley Jacobs	Girls' big air	60.66	63.00	63.00	10 Q	13.50	53.75	52.25	106.00	8
Riley Jacobs	Girls' halfpipe	69.00	67.33	69.00	5 Q	60.33	51.33	41.66	60.33	6
Montana Osinski	Girls' big air	16.33	30.00	30.00	16	Did not advance				
Montana Osinski	Girls' slopestyle	58.50	53.50	58.50	11 Q	21.75	42.50	40.75	42.50	10
Jenna Riccomini	Girls' big air	77.66	64.66	77.66	4 Q	67.75	9.75	60.75	128.50	5
Jenna Riccomini	Girls' halfpipe	45.33	46.00	46.00	12	Did not advance				
Jenna Riccomini	Girls' slopestyle	59.25	57.00	59.25	10 Q	26.75	47.00	52.00	52.00	8

== Ice hockey ==
The United States sent one boys' ice hockey team consisting of 17 athletes.

=== Boys' tournament ===
The team roster is listed as follows:

No.	Pos.	2020 Winter Youth Olympics United States U-16 boys' ice hockey team roster	Height	Weight	Birthdate	Hometown	Current Team
1	G	Dylan Silverstein	183 cm (6 ft 0 in)	73 kg (161 lb)	7 February 2004	Calabasas, California	Dexter Southfield (NEPSAC)
30	G	Arthur Smith	191 cm (6 ft 3 in)	85 kg (187 lb)	30 April 2004	Farmington, Connecticut	Selects Academy
5	D	Vinny Borgesi	168 cm (5 ft 6 in)	60 kg (130 lb)	2 March 2004	Philadelphia, Pennsylvania	Selects Academy
2	D	Hunter Brzustewicz	175 cm (5 ft 9 in)	76 kg (168 lb)	29 November 2004	Washington Township, Michigan	Oakland Jr. Grizzlies (HPHL)
3	D	Seamus Casey	175 cm (5 ft 9 in)	61 kg (134 lb)	8 January 2004	Estero, Florida	Florida Alliance (NAPHL)
4	D	Ryan Chesley	185 cm (6 ft 1 in)	77 kg (170 lb)	27 February 2004	Mahtomedi, Minnesota	Shattuck-St. Mary's
7	D	Tyler Duke – A	170 cm (5 ft 7 in)	70 kg (150 lb)	19 July 2004	Strongsville, Ohio	Compuware Hockey Club (HPHL)
6	D	Lane Hutson	165 cm (5 ft 5 in)	54 kg (119 lb)	14 February 2004	North Barrington, Illinois	North Jersey Avalanche (AYHL)
11	F	Gavin Brindley	170 cm (5 ft 7 in)	61 kg (134 lb)	5 October 2004	Estero, Florida	Florida Alliance (NAPHL)
8	F	Maddox Fleming – A	180 cm (5 ft 11 in)	70 kg (150 lb)	13 February 2004	Rochester, Minnesota	Shattuck-St. Mary's
9	F	Cutter Gauthier	180 cm (5 ft 11 in)	77 kg (170 lb)	19 January 2004	Northville, Michigan	Compuware Hockey Club (HPHL)
10	F	Isaac Howard	175 cm (5 ft 9 in)	73 kg (161 lb)	30 March 2004	Hudson, Wisconsin	Shattuck-St. Mary's
17	F	Cruz Lucius	170 cm (5 ft 7 in)	52 kg (115 lb)	5 April 2004	Grant, Minnesota	Gentry Academy (NAPHL)
12	F	Rutger McGroarty	180 cm (5 ft 11 in)	77 kg (170 lb)	30 March 2004	Lincoln, Nebraska	Oakland Jr. Grizzlies (HPHL)
14	F	Frank Nazar	175 cm (5 ft 9 in)	66 kg (146 lb)	14 January 2004	Mount Clemens, Michigan	HoneyBaked Hockey Club (HPHL)
15	F	Jimmy Snuggerud – C	183 cm (6 ft 0 in)	74 kg (163 lb)	1 June 2004	Chaska, Minnesota	Chaska High School (MSHSL)
16	F	Charlie Stramel	188 cm (6 ft 2 in)	93 kg (205 lb)	15 October 2004	Apple Valley, Minnesota	Rosemount High School (MSHSL)

Coaching staff

Head Coach: Scott Paluch
Assistant Coaches: Guy Gosselin, Kevin Reiter

Summary

Key:

- OT – Overtime
- GWS – Match decided by penalty-shootout

Team	Event	Group stage			Semifinal	Final	
Team	Event	Opposition Score	Opposition Score	Rank	Opposition Score	Opposition Score	Rank
United States boys'	Boys' tournament	Finland; W 7–5	Switzerland; W 8–2	1 Q	Canada; W 2–1	Russia; L 0–4	2nd place, silver medalist(s)

== Luge ==
Boys

Athlete	Event	Run 1		Run 2		Total	
Athlete	Event	Time	Rank	Time	Rank	Time	Rank
Matthew Greiner	Singles	54.897	9	54.833	7	1:49.730	9
Hunter Harris	Singles	55.725	18	55.880	16	1:51.605	15
Samuel Day; Samuel Eckert	Doubles	55.624	5	58.233	9	1:53.857	8

Girls

Athlete	Event	Run 1		Run 2		Total	
Athlete	Event	Time	Rank	Time	Rank	Time	Rank
McKenna Mazlo	Singles	56.045	14	56.047	16	1:52.092	15
Maya Chan; Reannyn Weiler	Doubles	56.145	3	57.095	6	1:53.240	4

Mixed team relay

Athlete	Event	Girls' singles		Boys' singles		Doubles		Total	
Athlete	Event	Time	Rank	Time	Rank	Time	Rank	Time	Rank
McKenna Mazlo; Matthew Greiner; Maya Chan; Reannyn Weiler	Team relay	58.047	7	59.955	6	1:01.177	8	2:59.179	7

== Nordic combined ==
Individual

Athlete	Event	Ski jumping				Cross-country	
Athlete	Event	Distance	Points	Rank	Deficit	Time	Rank
Carter Brubaker	Boys' Normal hill/6 km	DNS					
Niklas Malacinski	Boys' Normal hill/6 km	85.5	116.9	3	0:15	15:32.9	5
Tess Arnone	Girls' Normal hill/4 km	71.0	86.7	15	2:00	14:18.0	14
Alexa Brabec	Girls' Normal hill/4 km	69.5	88.8	14	1:53	14:18.4	15

Nordic mixed team

Athlete	Event	Ski jumping			Cross-country	
Athlete	Event	Points	Rank	Deficit	Time	Rank
Tess Arnone; Niklas Malacinski; Annika Belshaw; Erik Belshaw; Sydney Palmer-Leger; Will Koch	Nordic mixed team	385.5	7	2:13	32:45.4	6

== Short track speed skating ==
Three American skaters achieved quota places for the USA delegation based on the results of the 2019 World Junior Short Track Speed Skating Championships.

Boys

Athlete	Event	Heats		Quarterfinal		Semifinal		Final	
Athlete	Event	Time	Rank	Time	Rank	Time	Rank	Time	Rank
Jonathan So	500 m	PEN		Did not advance					
Jonathan So	1000 m	1:30.428	1 Q	1:31.616	1 Q	1:31.810	2 Q	1:33.896	4

Girls

Athlete	Event	Heats		Quarterfinal		Semifinal		Final	
Athlete	Event	Time	Rank	Time	Rank	Time	Rank	Time	Rank
Jenell Berhorst	500 m	47.836	1 Q	46.243	3	Did not advance			
Jenell Berhorst	1000 m	PEN		Did not advance					
Hailey Choi	500 m	45.103	2 Q	44.956	2 Q	44.849	4	46.185	7
Hailey Choi	1000 m	1:35.837	1 Q	1:33.787	3	Did not advance			

Mixed

Athlete	Event	Heats		Final	
Athlete	Event	Time	Rank	Time	Rank
Team B Kim Chan-seo (KOR); Diede van Oorschot (NED); Shogo Miyata (JPN); Jonathan So (USA)	Mixed team relay	4:11.095	1 QA	4:12.378	1st place, gold medalist(s)
Team D Michelle Velzeboer (NED); Jenell Berhorst (USA); Zhang Tianyi (CHN); Sanzhar Zhanissov (KAZ)	Mixed team relay	4:13.578	3 QB	PEN	
Team H Zhang Chutong (CHN); Hailey Choi (USA); Lee Jeong-min (KOR); Natthapat Kancharin (THA)	Mixed team relay	4:31.666	4 QB	4:15.234	5

== Skeleton ==
Athlete	Event	Run 1		Run 2		Total	
Athlete	Event	Time	Rank	Time	Rank	Time	Rank
Teddy Fitzsimons	Boys	1:14.32	19	1:13.75	18	2:28.07	18
James McGuire	Boys	1:12.40	16	1:10.91	12	2:23.31	16

== Ski jumping ==
Boys

Athlete	Event	First round			Final			Total	
Athlete	Event	Distance	Points	Rank	Distance	Points	Rank	Points	Rank
Erik Belshaw	Normal hill	82.0	102.2	16	75.5	93.8	24	196.0	22
Landon Lee	Normal hill	68.0	73.1	32	67.5	76.4	31	149.5	32

Girls

Athlete	Event	First round			Final			Total	
Athlete	Event	Distance	Points	Rank	Distance	Points	Rank	Points	Rank
Annika Belshaw	Normal hill	68.5	90.5	20	66.0	73.4	21	163.9	21
Paige Jones	Normal hill	68.0	82.2	23	70.5	70.9	22	153.1	23

Mixed

Athlete	Event	First round			Final			Total	
Athlete	Event	Distance	Points	Rank	Distance	Points	Rank	Points	Rank
Alexa Brabec; Niklas Malacinski; Paige Jones; Landon Lee	Mixed Team	280.0	353.9	10	265.5	323.2	11	677.1	11

== Ski mountaineering ==
Individual

Athlete	Event	Time	Rank
George Beck	Individual	53:51.21	12
Jeremiah Vaille	Individual	56:58.99	17
Samantha Paisley	Individual	1:18:40.08	20
Grace Staberg	Individual	1:03:21.24	7

Sprint

Athlete	Event	Qualification		Quarterfinal		Semifinal		Final	
Athlete	Event	Time	Rank	Time	Rank	Time	Rank	Time	Rank
George Beck	Boys' sprint	3:06.06	14	3:04.40	5	Did not advance			
Jeremiah Vaille	Boys' sprint	3:12.19	18	3:05.73	5	Did not advance			
Samantha Paisley	Girls' sprint	3:56.44	14	3:48.55	5	Did not advance			
Grace Staberg	Girls' sprint	3:53.25	12	3:49.58	4	Did not advance			

Mixed

Athlete	Event	Time	Rank
Grace Staberg; Jeremiah Vaille; Samantha Paisley; George Beck	Mixed relay	39:07	6

== Snowboarding ==
Snowboard cross

Athlete	Event	Group heats		Semifinal	Final
Athlete	Event	Points	Rank	Position	Position
Theo McLemore	Boys' snowboard cross	17	4 Q	3 SF	8
Connor Schlegel	Boys' snowboard cross	16	5	Did not advance	
Acy Craig	Girls' snowboard cross	13	7	Did not advance	
Madeline Lochte-Bono	Girls' snowboard cross	16	6	Did not advance	

Athlete	Event	Pre-Heats	Quarterfinals	Semifinal	Final
Athlete	Event	Position	Position	Position	Position
Mixed Team 11; Madeline Lochte-Bono (USA); Kayla Anna Lozáková (SVK); Theo McLemore (USA); Jakub Válek (SVK)	Team snowboard ski cross	2 Q	4	Did not advance	

Halfpipe, Slopestyle, & Big Air

Athlete	Event	Qualification				Final				
Athlete	Event	Run 1	Run 2	Best	Rank	Run 1	Run 2	Run 3	Best	Rank
Jack Coyne	Boys' big air	DNS								
Jack Coyne	Boys' halfpipe	69.00	64.00	69.00	8 Q	70.33	53.00	76.00	76.00	5
Jack Coyne	Boys' slopestyle	58.33	63.33	63.33	10 Q	34.33	34.00	30.33	34.33	8
Will Healy	Boys' big air	60.25	70.25	70.25	10 Q	12.75	61.75	66.25	128.00	6
Will Healy	Boys' slopestyle	DNS	14.33	14.33	18	Did not advance				
Dusty Henricksen	Boys' big air	90.50	86.75	90.50	2 Q	94.25	82.50	28.50	176.75	4
Dusty Henricksen	Boys' slopestyle	84.66	21.00	84.66	2 Q	94.00	96.33	27.00	96.33	1st place, gold medalist(s)
Kolman LeCroy	Boys' halfpipe	18.33	82.33	82.33	5 Q	15.66	42.33	12.33	42.33	10
Athena Comeau	Girls' halfpipe	42.66	37.00	42.66	10	Did not advance				
Tessa Maud	Girls' halfpipe	82.00	12.33	82.00	4 Q	76.00	76.00	18.66	76.00	4
Courtney Rummel	Girls' big air	53.66	DNS	53.66	8 Q	DNS				
Courtney Rummel	Girls' slopestyle	41.75	22.75	41.75	8 Q	53.25	DNS	DNS	53.25	7
Ty Schnorrbusch	Girls' big air	70.00	DNS	70.00	5 Q	62.50	68.50	56.00	131.00	5
Ty Schnorrbusch	Girls' slopestyle	52.25	61.75	61.75	3 Q	59.75	30.25	15.50	59.75	6

== Speed skating ==
Boys

Athlete	Event	Time	Rank
Jordan Stolz	500 m	37.34	5
Jordan Stolz	1500 m	2:02.84	21
Jonathan Tobon	500 m	37.78	8
Jonathan Tobon	1500 m	1:55.67	3rd place, bronze medalist(s)

Mass Start

Athlete	Event	Semifinal			Final		
Athlete	Event	Points	Time	Rank	Points	Time	Rank
Jordan Stolz	Boys' mass start	DNF			Did not advance		
Jonathan Tobon	Boys' mass start	12	6:32.83	3 Q	1	6:30.97	8

Mixed

Athlete	Event	Time	Rank
Team 5 Amalie Haugland (NOR); Kim Min-hui (KOR); Oddbjørn Mellemstrand (CZE); Jordan Stolz (NED)	Mixed team sprint	Disqualified	
Team 14; Ramona Ionel (ROU); Valeriia Sorokoletova (RUS); Tuukka Suomalainen (FIN); Jonathan Tobon (USA)	Mixed team sprint	2:05.96	3rd place, bronze medalist(s)

== See also ==
- United States at the 2020 Summer Olympics
