= Snowboarding at the 2020 Winter Youth Olympics – Girls' snowboard cross =

Girls' snowboard cross at the III Winter Youth Olympic Games
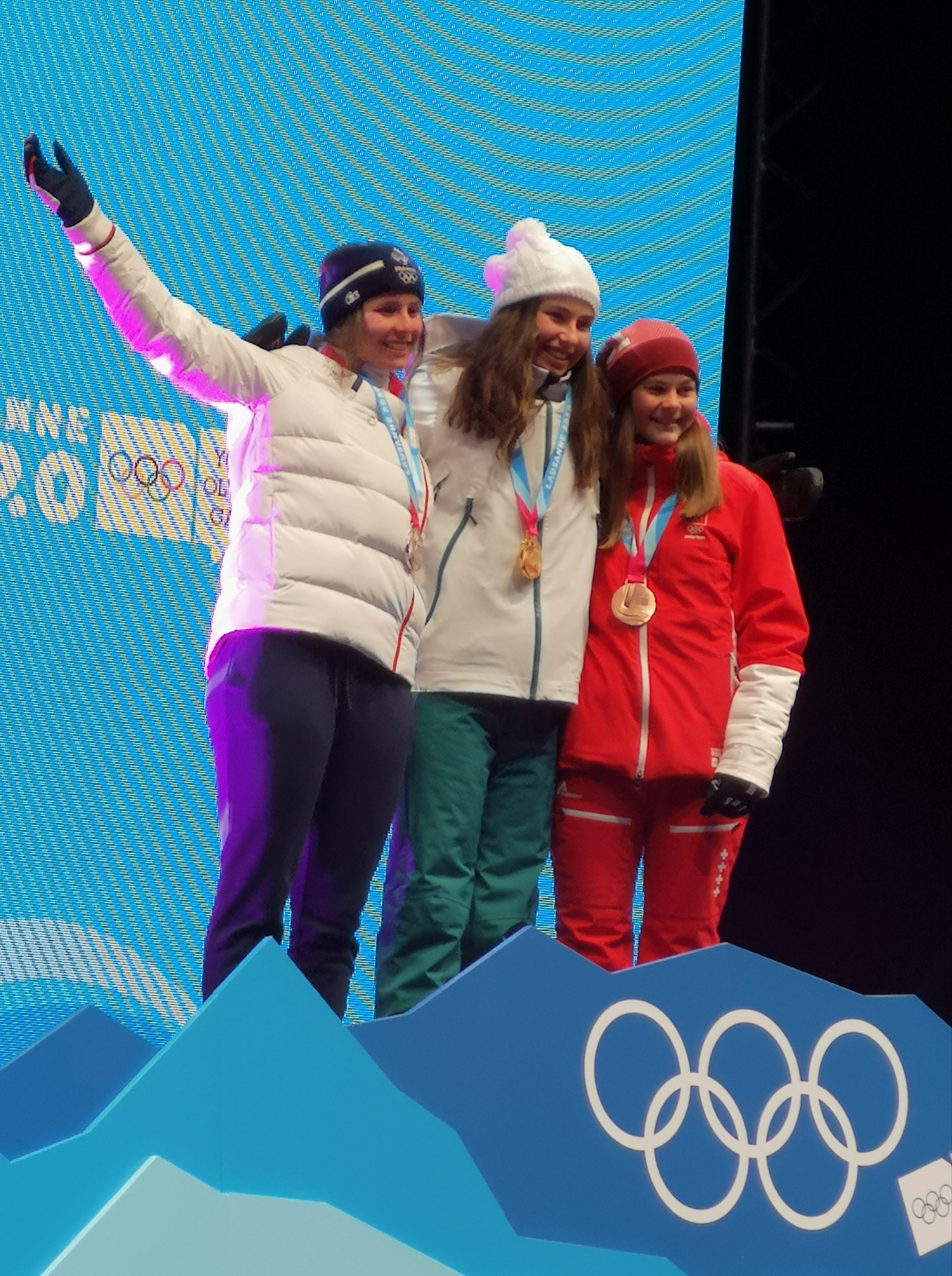
- Venue: Villars Winter Park
- Dates: 20 January
- Competitors: 27 from 16 nations

Medalists
1st place, gold medalist(s)		Josie Baff	Australia
2nd place, silver medalist(s)		Margaux Herpin	France
3rd place, bronze medalist(s)		Anouk Dörig	Switzerland

The girls' snowboard cross event in snowboarding at the 2020 Winter Youth Olympics took place on 20 January at the Villars Winter Park.

== Results ==
=== Group heats ===
Panel 1

Rank	Bib	Athlete	Group 1				Group 2				Group 3				Group 4				Group 5				Total
Rank	Bib	Athlete	1	2	3	4	5	6	7	8	9	10	11	12	13	14	15	16	17	18	19	20	Total
1	4	Josie Baff (AUS)	3					4				4				4				4			19
2	9	Anna-Maria Galler (AUT)		3			4					3					4					4	18
3	5	Anouk Dörig (SUI)	4						4				4				2				4		18
4	16	Léonie Wiedmer (SUI)		4						4			3			3			3				17
5	20	Amber Essex (AUS)			4			3						2			3		4				16
6	1	Chloé Passerat (FRA)	2				3				4				4				2				15
7	12	Acy Craig (USA)		1				2			3							4			3		13
8	8	Chai Xin (CHN)	1							3				3				3				2	12
8	13	Celia Trinkl (GER)		2					3					4	DNF					DNS			12
10	21	Zsófia Vincze (HUN)			1				2		2					2						3	10
11	17	Karolína Dobrá (CZE)			3		2						DNF					DNS		DNS			7
12	24	Tanja Kobald (AUT)			2					DNF		2			DNS						DNS		6
13	25	Maxeen Thibeault (CAN)				4	DNS							DNS		DNS					DNS		4

Panel 2

Rank	Bib	Athlete	Group 6				Group 7				Group 8				Group 9				Group 10				Total
Rank	Bib	Athlete	1	2	3	4	5	6	7	8	9	10	11	12	13	14	15	16	17	18	19	20	Total
1	2	Margaux Herpin (FRA)	4				4				4				4				4				20
2	6	Anastasia Privalova (RUS)	3						4				4				4				4		19
3	23	Lilith Kuhnert (GER)			3					4		4			3						3		17
4	3	Sára Strnadová (CZE)	1					4				3				4				4			16
5	7	Ekaterina Lokteva-Zagorskaia (RUS)	2							3				4				3				4	16
6	18	Madeline Lochte-Bono (USA)			4		3						3					4		2			16
7	14	Marika Savoldelli (ITA)		4					3					3	2					3			15
8	22	Teodora Ilieva (BUL)			2				2		3					3						3	13
9	15	Federica Fantoni (ITA)		3						2			2			2			3				12
10	26	Aina Gomáriz (ESP)				4	1							2		1					2		10
10	27	Katarína Pitoňáková (SVK)				3		3					1		1							2	10
12	11	Nima Yongqing (CHN)		2				2			2							2			1		9
12	10	Morena Arroyo (ARG)		1			2					2					3					1	9
14	19	Bridget MacLean (CAN)			1			DNS						DNS			DNS		DNS				1

=== Semifinals ===
Semifinal 1

Rank	Bib	Name	Deficit	Notes
1	4	Josie Baff (AUS)		BF
2	6	Anastasia Privalova (RUS)	+0.23	BF
3	23	Lilith Kuhnert (GER)	+0.54	SF
4	16	Léonie Wiedmer (SUI)	+1:24.00	SF

Semifinal 2

Rank	Bib	Name	Deficit	Notes
1	2	Margaux Herpin (FRA)		BF
2	5	Anouk Dörig (SUI)		BF
3	3	Sára Strnadová (CZE)	+1.30	SF
4	9	Anna-Maria Galler (AUT)	DNF	SF

=== Finals ===
Small final

Rank	Bib	Name	Deficit
5	16	Léonie Wiedmer (SUI)	
6	9	Anna-Maria Galler (AUT)	+0.20
7	3	Sára Strnadová (CZE)	+0.40
8	23	Lilith Kuhnert (GER)	+4.19

Big final

Rank	Bib	Name	Deficit
1st place, gold medalist(s)	4	Josie Baff (AUS)	
2nd place, silver medalist(s)	2	Margaux Herpin (FRA)	+0.05
3rd place, bronze medalist(s)	5	Anouk Dörig (SUI)	+0.50
4	6	Anastasia Privalova (RUS)	+3.09
