= Snowboarding at the 2020 Winter Youth Olympics – Boys' snowboard cross =

Boys' snowboard cross at the III Winter Youth Olympic Games
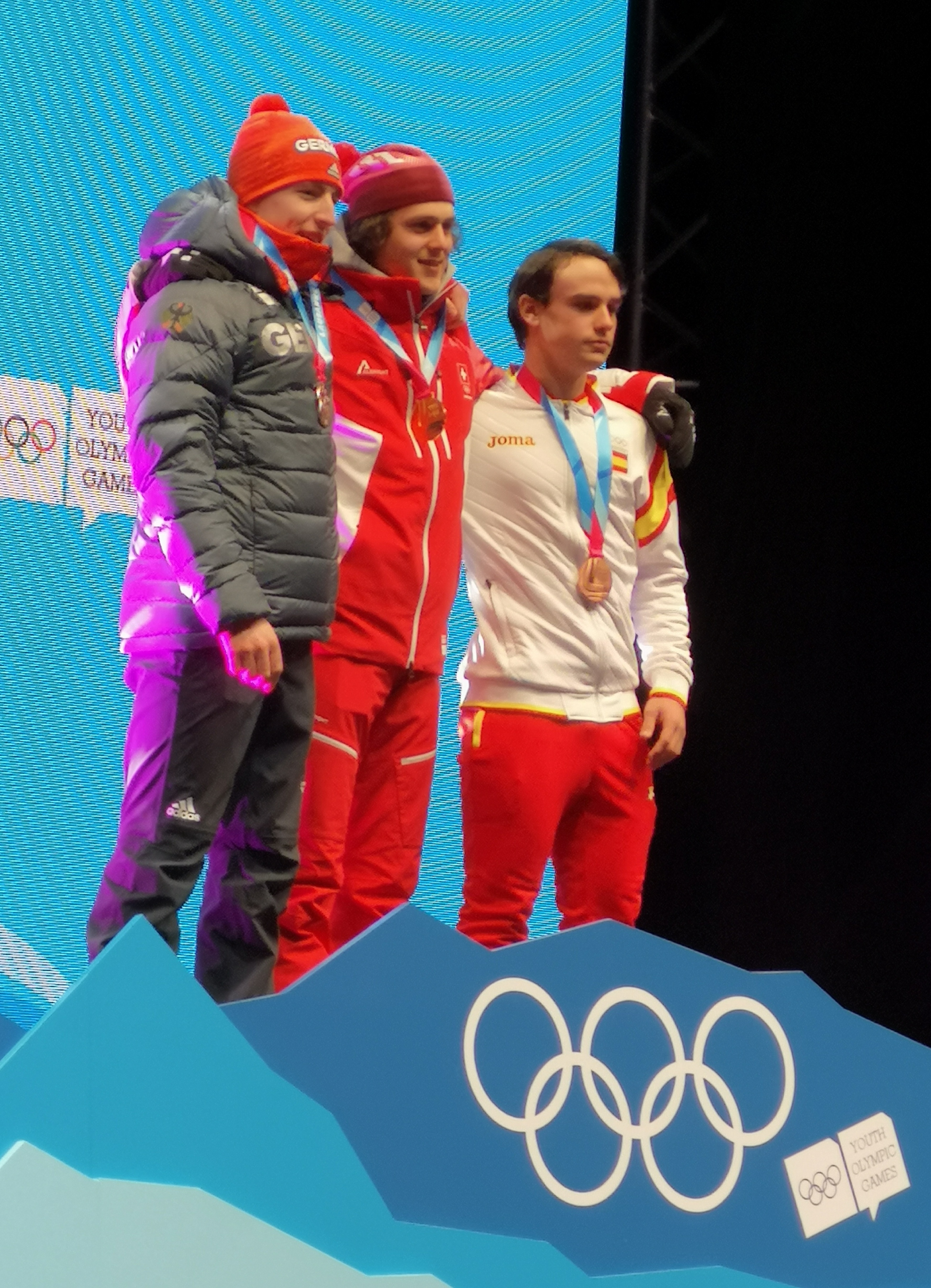
- Venue: Villars Winter Park
- Dates: 20 January
- Competitors: 27 from 20 nations

Medalists
1st place, gold medalist(s)		Valerio Jud	Switzerland
2nd place, silver medalist(s)		Niels Conradt	Germany
3rd place, bronze medalist(s)		Álvaro Romero	Spain

The boys' snowboard cross event in snowboarding at the 2020 Winter Youth Olympics took place on 20 January at the Villars Winter Park.

== Results ==
=== Group heats ===
Panel 1

Rank	Bib	Athlete	Group 1				Group 2				Group 3				Group 4				Group 5				Total
Rank	Bib	Athlete	1	2	3	4	5	6	7	8	9	10	11	12	13	14	15	16	17	18	19	20	Total
1	8	Valerio Jud (SUI)	4							3				4				4				4	19
2	12	Álvaro Romero (ESP)		4				3			4							3			4		18
3	16	Thomas Abegglen (SUI)		2						4			4			4			4				18
4	1	Finn Sadler (AUS)	3				4				3				4				3				17
5	17	Niccolò Colturi (ITA)			4		3						2					2		4			15
6	4	Noah Bethonico (BRA)	2					2				4				3				3			14
6	9	Noa Coutton-Jean (FRA)		3			2					2					4					3	14
6	20	Ivan Malovannyi (UKR)			3			4						2			3		2				14
9	5	Felix Powondra (AUT)	1						3				3				2				3		12
6	13	Tristan Bell (CAN)		1					4					3	2					2			12
11	21	Vladi Kambourov (BUL)			2				2		2					2						2	10
11	24	Silviu Popa (ROU)			1					2		3			3						1		10
13	25	Arseniy Tomin (RUS)				4	1							1		1					2		9

Panel 2

Rank	Bib	Athlete	Group 6				Group 7				Group 8				Group 9				Group 10				Total
Rank	Bib	Athlete	1	2	3	4	5	6	7	8	9	10	11	12	13	14	15	16	17	18	19	20	Total
1	2	Quentin Sodogas (FRA)	4				4				4				4				4				20
2	19	Niels Conradt (GER)			4			4						4			3		3				18
3	26	Matouš Šmerák (CZE)				4	3							3		3					4		17
4	10	Theodore McLemore (USA)		4			1					4					4					4	17
5	3	Connor Schlegel (USA)	3					3				3				4				3			16
6	14	Evgeniy Genin (RUS)		1					4					2	3					4			14
6	18	Luca Abbati (ITA)			3		2						4					3		2			14
8	6	Gao Dali (CHN)	2						3				3				2				2		12
8	15	Jacob Walper (CAN)		2						4			2			2			2				12
10	7	Dante Vera (ARG)	1							2				1				4				3	11
10	11	Seigo Sato (JPN)		3				2			3							2			1		11
10	23	Elias Leitner (AUT)			1					3		2			2						3		11
13	22	Seo Gyeong (KOR)			2				2		2					1						2	9
14	27	Dimitrios Graikos (GRE)				3		1					1		1							1	7

=== Semifinals ===
Semifinal 1

Rank	Bib	Name	Deficit	Notes
1	8	Valerio Jud (SUI)		BF
2	19	Niels Conradt (GER)	+0.31	BF
3	1	Finn Sadler (AUS)	+0.45	SF
4	26	Matouš Šmerák (CZE)	+6.80	SF

Semifinal 2

Rank	Bib	Name	Deficit	Notes
1	2	Quentin Sodogas (FRA)		BF
2	12	Álvaro Romero (ESP)	+0.20	BF
3	10	Theodore McLemore (USA)	+0.34	SF
4	16	Thomas Abegglen (SUI)	+5.22	SF

=== Finals ===
Small final

Rank	Bib	Name	Deficit
5	16	Thomas Abegglen (SUI)	
6	26	Matouš Šmerák (CZE)	+0.32
7	1	Finn Sadler (AUS)	+10.44
8	10	Theodore McLemore (USA)	DNF

Big final

Rank	Bib	Name	Deficit
1st place, gold medalist(s)	8	Valerio Jud (SUI)	
2nd place, silver medalist(s)	19	Niels Conradt (GER)	+0.13
3rd place, bronze medalist(s)	12	Álvaro Romero (ESP)	+8.06
4	2	Quentin Sodogas (FRA)	+21.18
