= Thibe Deseyn =

Swiss ski mountaineer (born 2003)

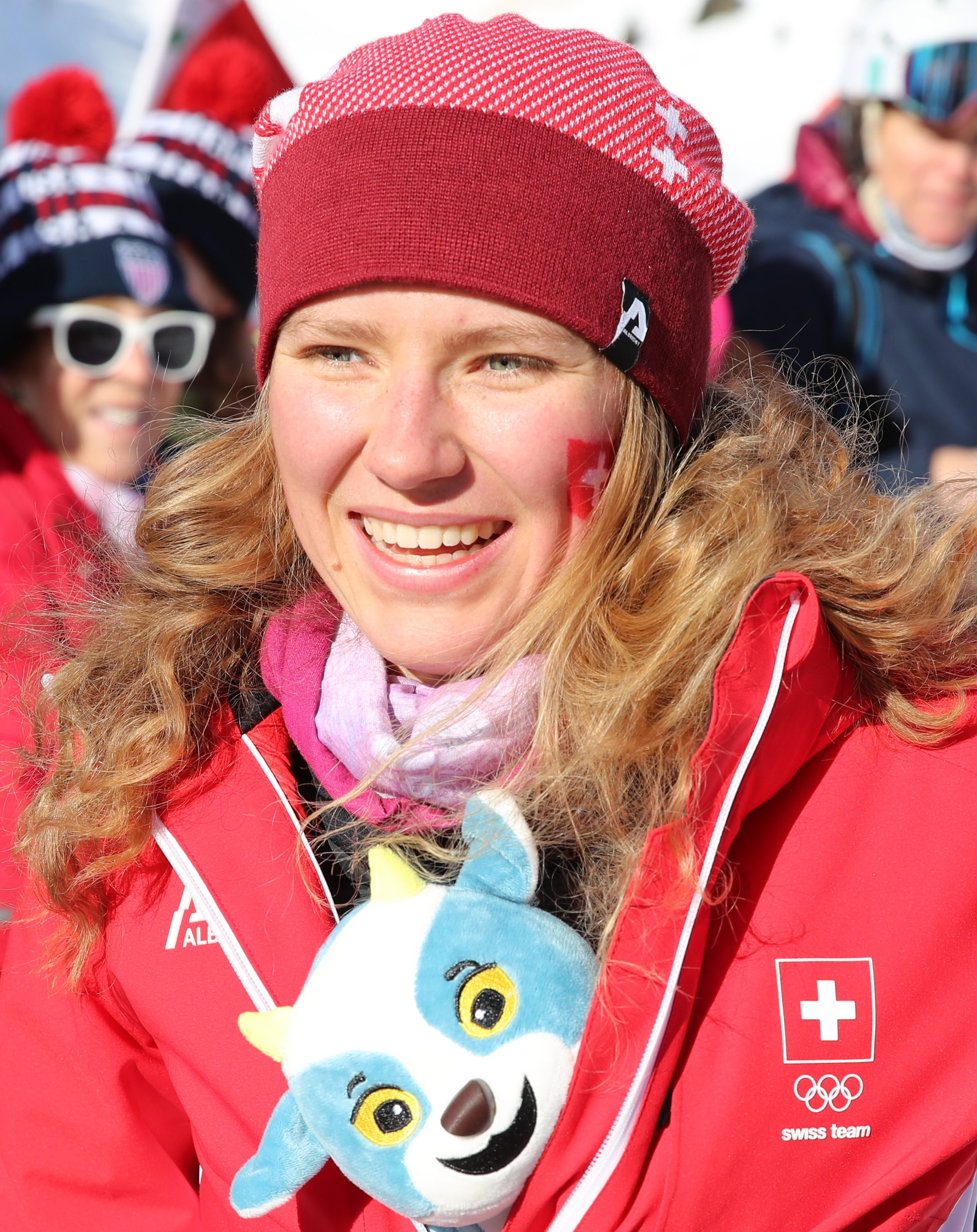
- Deseyn at the 2020 Winter Youth Olympics

Personal information
- Born: 18 March 2003 (age 23) Sierre, Switzerland
- Height: 1.65 m (5 ft 5 in)
- Weight: 53 kg (117 lb)

Sport
- Country: Switzerland
- Sport: Ski mountaineering
Medal record
Women's ski mountaineering
Representing Switzerland
Youth Olympic Games
Gold medal – first place	2020 Lausanne	Mixed relay
Silver medal – second place	2020 Lausanne	Individual race

Thibe Deseyn (born 18 March 2003) is a Swiss ski mountaineer.

== Career ==
Deseyn represented Switzerland at the 2020 Winter Youth Olympics in ski mountaineering, an event making its Youth Olympics debut. She began the Youth Olympics with a silver medal in the individual race with a time of 59:38.58. She also won a gold medal in the mixed relay with a time of 35:07.

She competed at the 2023 World Championship of Ski Mountaineering and won a gold medal in the youth mixed relay, along with Jon Kistler, with a time of 29:45.9. She also won a gold medal in the under-20 vertical race, and bronze medals in the sprint race and individual races. She again competed at the 2025 World Championship of Ski Mountaineering and won a gold medal in the under-23 vertical race with a time of 24:23.6, and a silver medal in the individual race with a time of 1:47:31.4, finishing behind gold medalist Margot Ravinel.

During the first mixed relay race of the 2025–26 ISMF Ski Mountaineering World Cup on 6 December 2025, she earned his first career World Cup podium, finishing in third place, along with Arno Lietha.
