= María Costa (ski mountaineer) =

Spanish ski mountaineer (born 2002)

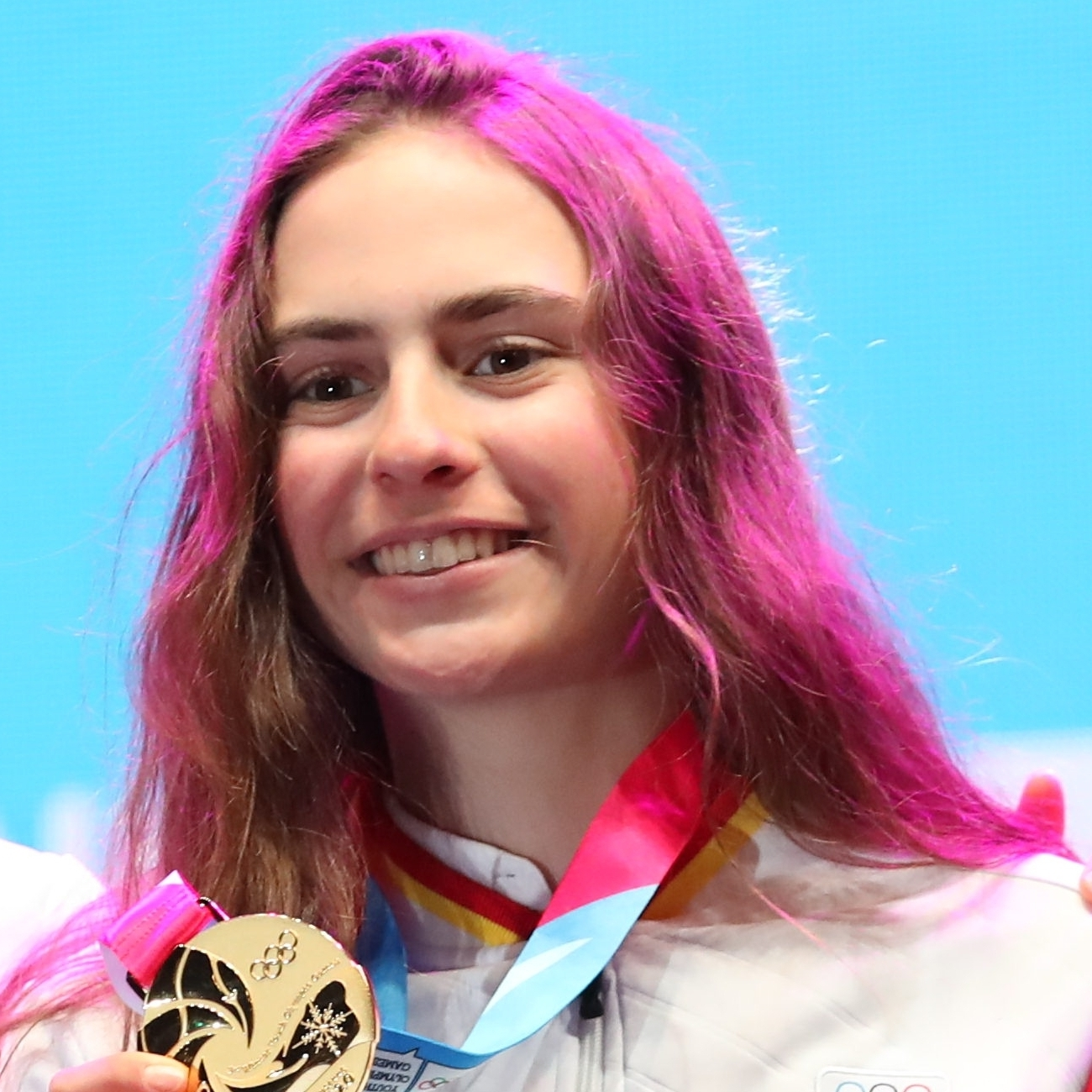
- Costa at the 2020 Winter Youth Olympics

Personal information
- Full name: María Costa Díez
- Born: 28 November 2002 (age 23) Santpedor, Spain
- Height: 1.65 m (5 ft 5 in)
- Weight: 55 kg (121 lb)

Sport
- Country: Spain
- Sport: Ski mountaineering
Medal record
Women's ski mountaineering
Representing Spain
Youth Olympic Games
Gold medal – first place	2020 Lausanne	Sprint race
Bronze medal – third place	2020 Lausanne	Mixed relay

María Costa Díez (born 28 November 2002) is a Spanish ski mountaineer.

== Career ==
Díez represented Spain at the 2020 Winter Youth Olympics in ski mountaineering, an event making its Youth Olympics debut. She began the Youth Olympics with a gold medal in the sprint race with a time of 3:22.45. She also won a bronze medal in the mixed relay with a time of 37:13.

She will represent Spain at the 2026 Winter Olympics.
