= China at the 2020 Winter Youth Olympics =

- IOC code: CHN
- NOC: Chinese Olympic Committee
- Website: www.olympic.cn (in Chinese and English)

in Lausanne
- Competitors: 53 in 14 sports
- Medals Ranked 9th: Gold 3 Silver 3 Bronze 4 Total 10

Winter Youth Olympics appearances (overview)
- 2012; 2016; 2020; 2024

China competed at the 2020 Winter Youth Olympics in Lausanne, Switzerland from 9 to 22 January 2020.

China competes in 14 events and have 53 competitors. At the end of the games, it bags home 10 medals (3 gold, 3 silver and 4 bronze).

It was the final rehearsal for China to stage the winter games since Beijing is the host city of the 2022 Winter Olympics which was held from 4 to 20 February 2022.

== Medalists ==
Medal	Name	Sport	Event	Date
Gold	Yang Binyu	Speed skating	Girls' mass start	16 January
Gold	Eileen Gu	Freestyle skiing	Girls' halfpipe	20 January
Gold	Eileen Gu	Freestyle skiing	Girls' big air	22 January
Silver	Wang Jingyi	Speed skating	Girls' 500 metres	12 January
Silver	Zhang Xinyue	Ice hockey	Girls' 3x3 mixed tournament	15 January
Silver	Eileen Gu	Freestyle skiing	Girls' slopestyle	18 January
Silver	Li Fanghui	Freestyle skiing	Girls' halfpipe	20 January
Bronze	Xue Zhiwen	Speed skating	Boys' 500 metres	12 January
Bronze	Yang Binyu	Speed skating	Girls' 1500 metres	13 January
Bronze	Li Kongchao	Short track speed skating	Boys' 1000 metres	18 January
Bronze	Zhang Tianyi	Short track speed skating	Boys' 500 metres	20 January
Bronze	Pei Junhang	Curling	Mixed doubles	22 January

== Alpine skiing ==
Boys

Athlete	Event	Run 1		Run 2		Total	
Athlete	Event	Time	Rank	Time	Rank	Time	Rank
Yi Xiaoyang	Giant slalom	1:13.80	47	1:13.64	43	2:27.44	43
Yi Xiaoyang	Slalom	DNF					

Girls

Athlete	Event	Run 1		Run 2		Total	
Athlete	Event	Time	Rank	Time	Rank	Time	Rank
Wang Shengjie	Giant slalom	1:25.66	51	1:21.33	34	2:46.89	34

== Biathlon ==
Boys

Athlete	Event	Time	Misses	Rank
Gou Zhendong	Sprint	23:00.8	6 (1+5)	59
Gou Zhendong	Individual	42:32.2	10 (4+1+4+1)	74
Liu Zhaoyu	Sprint	23:03.9	3 (1+2)	60
Liu Zhaoyu	Individual	43:50.1	9 (4+0+3+2)	83
Shi Yuanyuan	Sprint	22:52.5	4 (0+4)	57
Shi Yuanyuan	Individual	39:32.2	6 (2+1+2+1)	44

Girls

Athlete	Event	Time	Misses	Rank
Ding Yuhuan	Sprint	20:43.8	4 (3+1)	34
Ding Yuhuan	Individual	37:43.8	6 (1+2+2+1)	30

Mixed

Athletes	Event	Time	Misses	Rank
Ding Yuhuan; Gou Zhendong	Single mixed relay	46:10.7	7+18	17

== Cross-country skiing ==
Boys

Athlete	Event	Qualification		Quarterfinal		Semifinal		Final	
Athlete	Event	Time	Rank	Time	Rank	Time	Rank	Time	Rank
Gu Cang	Free sprint	3:40.30	57	Did not advance					
Gu Cang	Cross-country cross	4:57.93	59	—		Did not advance			
Zhang Chenghao	10 km classic	—						29:15.5	31
Zhang Chenghao	Free sprint	3:31.41	41	Did not advance					
Zhang Chenghao	Cross-country cross	4:43.05	46	—		Did not advance			

Girls

Athlete	Event	Qualification		Quarterfinal		Semifinal		Final	
Athlete	Event	Time	Rank	Time	Rank	Time	Rank	Time	Rank
Dong Zhaohui	5 km classic	—						16:50.2	48
Dong Zhaohui	Free sprint	3:03.97	43	Did not advance					
Dong Zhaohui	Cross-country cross	5:56.93	55	—		Did not advance			
Yang Lianhong	5 km classic	—						16:48.9	45
Yang Lianhong	Free sprint	3:02.36	39	Did not advance					
Yang Lianhong	Cross-country cross	5:32.83	39	—		Did not advance			

== Curling ==
China qualified a mixed team of four athletes.

Mixed team

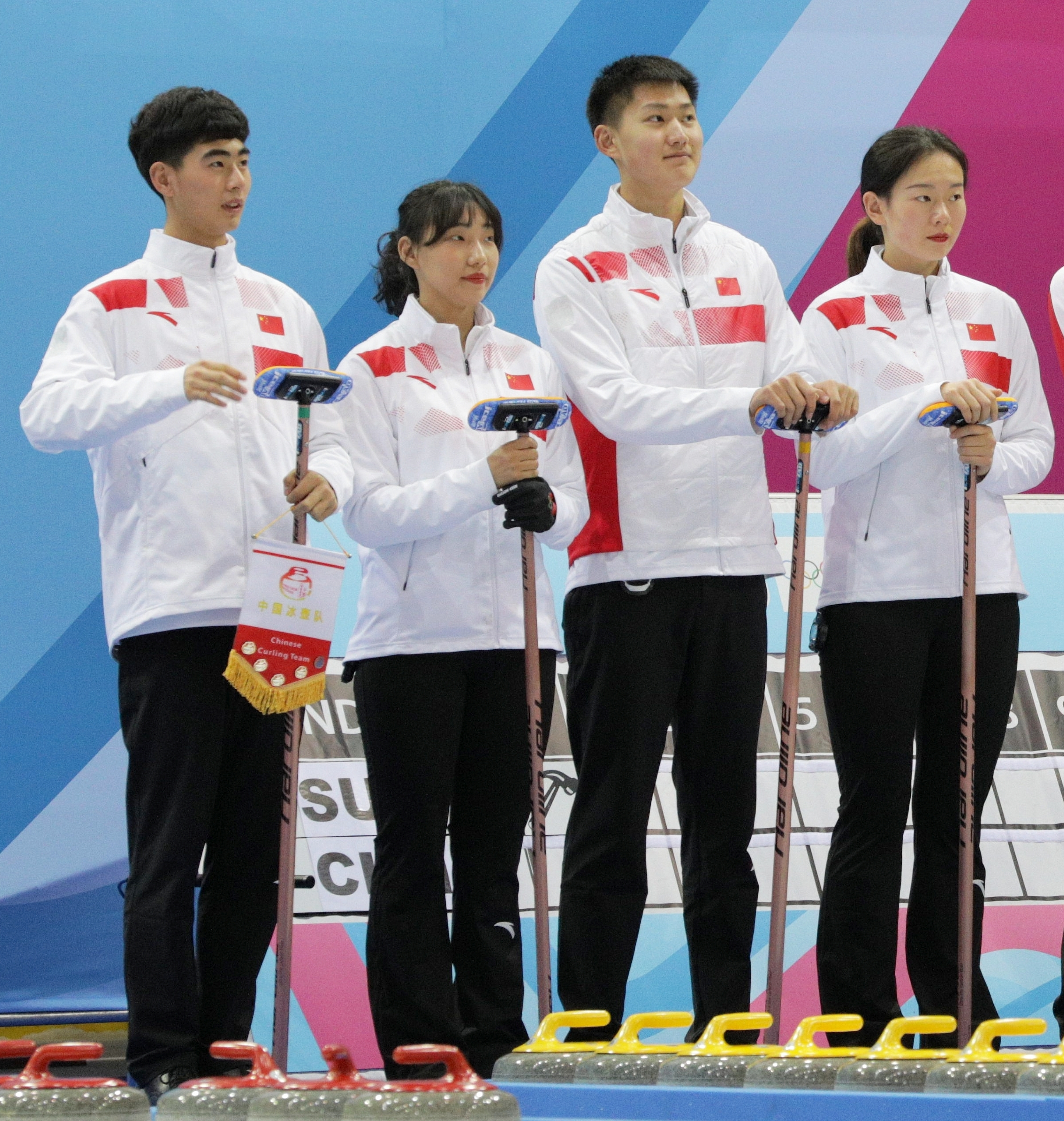
Chinese curling mixed team

Team	Event	Group stage						Quarterfinal	Semifinal	Final / BM	
Team	Event	Opposition Score	Opposition Score	Opposition Score	Opposition Score	Opposition Score	Rank	Opposition Score	Opposition Score	Opposition Score	Rank
Zhang Likun; Liu Tong; Zhai Zhixin; Pei Junhang	Mixed team	Switzerland; L 3 – 5	Brazil; W 14 – 1	Hungary; W 3 – 2	Germany; L 6 – 7	Denmark; L 3 – 9	3	Did not advance			9

Mixed doubles

Athletes	Event	Round of 48	Round of 24	Round of 12	Round of 6	Semifinals	Final / BM	
Athletes	Event	Opposition Result	Opposition Result	Opposition Result	Opposition Result	Opposition Result	Opposition Result	Rank
Karolina Jensen (DEN); Zhai Zhixin (CHN)	Mixed doubles	Forbregd (NOR); Vonda (LAT); W 10–5	Kobayashi (JPN); Tuaz (FRA); L 7–8	Did not advance				
Liu Tong (CHN); Selahattin Eser (TUR)	Mixed doubles	Vázquez (ESP); Iseli (SUI); W 12–7	Nagy (HUN); Young (CAN); L 4–8	Did not advance				
Monika Wosińska (POL); Zhang Likun (CHN)	Mixed doubles	Harman (NZL); Gros-Soubzmaigne (FRA); W 8–2	Denisenko (RUS); Seļiverstovs (LAT); W 7–3	Farková (CZE); Landelius (SWE); W 5–4	Beitone (FRA); Lysakov (RUS); L 4–14	Did not advance		
Pei Junhang (CHN); Vít Chabičovský (CZE)	Mixed doubles	Joó (HUN); Piffer (ITA); W 9–6	Hallström (SWE); Szmidt (POL); W 12–3	Gregori (SLO); Winz (SUI); W 8–2	Vergnaud (FRA); Buraas (NOR); W 7–3	Beitone (FRA); Lysakov (RUS); L 5–10	Kobayashi (JPN); Tuaz (FRA); W 7–3	3rd place, bronze medalist(s)

== Figure skating ==
Two Chinese figure skaters achieved quota places for China based on the results of the 2019 World Junior Figure Skating Championships.

Singles

Athletes	Event	SP		FS		Total	
Athletes	Event	Points	Rank	Points	Rank	Points	Rank
Chen Yudong	Boys	57.31	10	127.29	6	184.60	6

Pairs

Athletes	Event	SP/SD		FS/FD		Total	
Athletes	Event	Points	Rank	Points	Rank	Points	Rank
Huang Yihang; Wang Yuchen	Pairs	46.96	6	94.65	5	141.61	5

Mixed NOC team trophy

Athletes	Event	Free skate / Free dance					
Athletes	Event	Ice dance	Pairs	Girls	Boys	Total	
Athletes	Event	Points Team points	Points Team points	Points Team points	Points Team points	Points	Rank
Team Future; Anna Cherniavska / Oleg Muratov (UKR); Wang Yuchen / Huang Yihang (CHN); Anna Frolova (RUS); Matteo Nalbone (ITA)	Team trophy	80.86; 3	91.35; 4	126.00; 7	73.89; 1	15	7

== Freestyle skiing ==
Ski cross

Athlete	Event	Group heats		Semifinal	Final
Athlete	Event	Points	Rank	Position	Position
Hou Haoyi	Boys' ski cross	9	12	Did not advance	
Qiu Xiyang	Boys' ski cross	10	11	Did not advance	
Ran Hongyun	Girls' ski cross	11	10	Did not advance	
Su Yue	Girls' ski cross	9	12	Did not advance	

Slopestyle & Big Air

Athlete	Event	Qualification				Final				
Athlete	Event	Run 1	Run 2	Best	Rank	Run 1	Run 2	Run 3	Best	Rank
Li Songsheng	Boys' halfpipe	61.66	54.00	61.66	6 Q	64.33	39.00	35.66	64.33	9
Sun Jingbo	Boys' halfpipe	68.66	66.66	68.66	5 Q	69.66	54.66	66.66	69.66	6
Eileen Gu	Girls' big air	76.33	91.33	91.33	1 Q	24.25	89.75	81.50	171.25	1st place, gold medalist(s)
Eileen Gu	Girls' halfpipe	86.33	90.00	90.00	1 Q	90.66	93.00	90.00	93.00	1st place, gold medalist(s)
Eileen Gu	Girls' slopestyle	83.25	14.50	83.25	2 Q	87.00	26.50	93.25	93.25	2nd place, silver medalist(s)
Li Fanghui	Girls' halfpipe	83.00	84.66	84.66	2 Q	84.00	85.66	21.66	85.66	2nd place, silver medalist(s)
Wu Meng	Girls' halfpipe	75.33	76.66	76.66	4 Q	75.33	9.66	10.00	75.33	4
Yang Shuorui	Girls' big air	67.66	24.00	67.66	6 Q	59.25	17.50	78.00	137.25	4
Yang Shuorui	Girls' slopestyle	10.75	8.50	10.75	17	Did not advance				

== Ice hockey ==
Mixed NOC 3x3 tournament

Team	Event	Preliminary round								Semifinal	Final / BM	
Team	Event	Opposition Score	Opposition Score	Opposition Score	Opposition Score	Opposition Score	Opposition Score	Opposition Score	Rank	Opposition Score	Opposition Score	Rank
Team Black; Yu Jiacong and 12 teammates from other NOCs	Boys'	Team Brown (MIX); L 11–13	Team Red (MIX); L 9–12	Team Blue (MIX); W 14–8	Team Yellow (MIX); W 19–7	Team Orange (MIX); L 8–14	Team Grey (MIX); W 16–8	Team Green (MIX); W 6–4	4 Q	Team Green (MIX); L 3–7	Team Brown (MIX); L 5–6	4
Team Black; Zhang Xinyue and 12 teammates from other NOCs	Girls'	Team Brown (MIX); W 7–6	Team Red (MIX); W 5–4	Team Blue (MIX); L 4–8	Team Yellow (MIX); W 7–2	Team Orange (MIX); W 7–3	Team Grey (MIX); W 5–3	Team Green (MIX); W 9–4	1 Q	Team Brown (MIX); W 11–7	Team Yellow (MIX); L 1–6	2nd place, silver medalist(s)
Team Grey; Zhang Shuqi and 12 teammates from other NOCs	Girls'	Team Blue (MIX); L 7–9	Team Yellow (MIX); L 5–11	Team Brown (MIX); W 9–7	Team Red (MIX); W 8–5	Team Green (MIX); L 4–9	Team Black (MIX); L 3–5	Team Orange (MIX); W 8–6	6	Did not advance		
Team Orange; Wang Meihe and 12 teammates from other NOCs	Girls'	Team Red (MIX); W 6–4	Team Blue (MIX); L 4–7	Team Yellow (MIX); L 3–8	Team Brown (MIX); L 4–10	Team Black (MIX); L 3–7	Team Green (MIX); L 6–7	Team Grey (MIX); L 6–8	8	Did not advance		
Team Red; Nie Xinrui and 12 teammates from other NOCs	Girls'	Team Orange (MIX); L 4–6	Team Black (MIX); L 4–5	Team Green (MIX); L 7–9	Team Grey (MIX); L 5–8	Team Brown (MIX); W 11–7	Team Yellow (MIX); W 8–5	Team Blue (MIX); W 5–4 GWS	7	Did not advance		

== Luge ==
Boys

Athlete	Event	Run 1		Run 2		Total	
Athlete	Event	Time	Rank	Time	Rank	Time	Rank
Bao Zhenyu	Singles	55.239	11	55.666	14	1:50.905	14

== Short track speed skating ==
Three Chinese skaters achieved quota places for China based on the results of the 2019 World Junior Short Track Speed Skating Championships.

Boys

Athlete	Event	Heats		Quarterfinal		Semifinal		Final	
Athlete	Event	Time	Rank	Time	Rank	Time	Rank	Time	Rank
Li Kongchao	500 m	41.722	1 Q	41.524	2 Q	41.639	4 FB	42.419	7
Li Kongchao	1000 m	1:27.261	1 Q	1:31.134	1 Q	1:31.705	1 FA	1:33.851	3rd place, bronze medalist(s)
Zhang Tianyi	500 m	41.263	1 Q	40.614	1 Q	40.908	1 FA	48.570	3rd place, bronze medalist(s)
Zhang Tianyi	1000 m	1:27.261	1 Q	1:34.762	3	Did not advance			

Girls

Athlete	Event	Heats		Quarterfinal		Semifinal		Final	
Athlete	Event	Time	Rank	Time	Rank	Time	Rank	Time	Rank
Zhang Chutong	500 m	44.412	1 Q	44.232	1 Q	43.970	1 FA	PEN	
Zhang Chutong	1000 m	1:38.561	1 Q	1:35.105	2 Q	DNF	4 FB	1:33.580	6

Mixed

Athlete	Event	Semifinal		Final	
Athlete	Event	Time	Rank	Time	Rank
Team D Michelle Velzeboer (NED); Jenell Berhorst (USA); Zhang Tianyi (CHN); Sanzhar Zhanissov (KAZ)	Team relay	4:13.578	3 FB	PEN	
Team E Haruna Nagamori (JPN); Petra Rusnáková (SVK); Li Kongchao (CHN); Julian Macaraeg (PHI)	Team relay	4:22.054	4 FB	PEN	
Team H Zhang Chutong (CHN); Hailey Choi (USA); Lee Jeong-min (KOR); Natthapat Kancharin (THA)	Team relay	4:31.666	4 FB	4:15.234	5

Qualification Legend: FA=Final A (medal); FB=Final B (non-medal)

== Skeleton ==
Athlete	Event	Run 1		Run 2		Total	
Athlete	Event	Time	Rank	Time	Rank	Time	Rank
Zhao Dan	Girls'	1:12.27	7	1:12.06	7	2:24.33	7

== Ski jumping ==
Girls

Athlete	Event	First round			Final			Total	
Athlete	Event	Distance	Points	Rank	Distance	Points	Rank	Points	Rank
Zhou Fangyu	Normal hill	77.0	102.7	8	81.0	81.1	15	183.8	10

== Ski mountaineering ==
Individual

Athlete	Event	Time	Rank
Liang Qifan	Boys' individual	56:35.07	15
Suolang Quzhen	Girls' individual	1:02:08.99	4
Yu Jingxuan	Girls' individual	1:12:16.75	16

Sprint

Athlete	Event	Seeding		Quarterfinal		Semifinal		Final	
Athlete	Event	Time	Rank	Time	Rank	Time	Rank	Time	Rank
Liang Qifan	Boys' sprint	3:16.69	20	2:54.08	4	Did not advance			
Suolang Quzhen	Girls' sprint	3:46.82	7	3:31.21	1 Q	3:28.88	3 Q	3:33.00	4
Yu Jingxuan	Girls' sprint	3:46.90	8	3:34.99	3 Q	3:44.43	5	Did not advance	

Mixed

Athlete	Event	Time	Rank
World 2 Yu Jingxuan (CHN); Liang Qifan (CHN); Suolang Quzhen (CHN); Oriol Olm (AND)	Mixed relay	39:20	7

== Ski-snowboard cross ==
Team

Athlete	Event	Qualification	Quarterfinal	Semifinal	Final	
Athlete	Event	Group Rank	Group Rank	Group Rank	Group Rank	Rank
China; Chai Xin; Ran Hongyun; Gao Dali; Qiu Xiyang	Ski-snowboard cross	Bye	4	Did not advance		
Mixed Team 8 Nima Yongqing (CHN); Su Yue (CHN); Vladi Kambourov (BUL); Hou Haoyi (CHN)	Ski-snowboard cross	4	Did not advance			

== Snowboarding ==
Snowboard cross

Athlete	Event	Group heats		Semifinal	Final
Athlete	Event	Points	Rank	Position	Position
Gao Dali	Boys' snowboard cross	12	8	Did not advance	
Chai Xin	Girls' snowboard cross	12	8	Did not advance	
Nima Yongqing	Girls' snowboard cross	9	12	Did not advance	

Halfpipe, Slopestyle, & Big Air

Athlete	Event	Qualification				Final				
Athlete	Event	Run 1	Run 2	Best	Rank	Run 1	Run 2	Run 3	Best	Rank
Wang Xin	Boys' halfpipe	74.33	59.33	74.33	7 Q	67.33	73.00	13.66	73.00	7
Guo Junyan	Girls' big air	12.00	12.00	12.00	21	Did not advance				
Guo Junyan	Girls' slopestyle	7.75	1.50	7.75	21	Did not advance				
Jia Yanru	Girls' halfpipe	51.66	62.66	62.66	6 Q	12.00	10.00	15.00	15.00	8
Wang Jianjie	Girls' halfpipe	72.33	65.00	72.33	5 Q	66.66	73.00	72.00	73.00	5

== Speed skating ==
One Chinese skaters achieved quota places for China based on the results of the 2019 World Junior Speed Skating Championships.

Boys

Athlete	Event	Time	Rank
Sun Jiazhao	500 m	38.11	10
Sun Jiazhao	1500 m	1:58.10	9
Xue Zhiwen	500 m	36.67	3rd place, bronze medalist(s)
Xue Zhiwen	1500 m	2:07.44	29

Girls

Athlete	Event	Time	Rank
Wang Jingyi	500 m	41.07	2nd place, silver medalist(s)
Wang Jingyi	1500 m	DQ	
Yang Binyu	500 m	41.25	4
Yang Binyu	1500 m	2:10.93	3rd place, bronze medalist(s)

Mass Start

Athlete	Event	Semifinal			Final		
Athlete	Event	Points	Time	Rank	Points	Time	Rank
Sun Jiazhao	Boys' mass start	22	5:54.02	2 Q	4	6:30.75	5
Xue Zhiwen	Boys' mass start	0	6:43.49	15	Did not advance		
Wang Jingyi	Girls' mass start	10	6:50.56	3 Q	DNF		16
Yang Binyu	Girls' mass start	30	6:13.67	1 Q	30	6:50.68	1st place, gold medalist(s)

Mixed

Athlete	Event	Time	Rank
Team 2 Zuzana Kuršová (CZE); Wang Jingyi (CHN); Manuel Zähringer (GER); Andrei Herman (BLR)	Mixed team sprint	2:09.32	11
Team 4 Carla Álvarez (ESP); Yang Binyu (CHN); Filip Hawryłak (POL); Nuraly Akzhol (KAZ)	Mixed team sprint	2:10.67	13
Team 8 Darya Gavrilova (KAZ); Victoria Stirnemann (GER); Flavio Gross (SUI); Sun Jiazhao (CHN)	Mixed team sprint	2:07.71	8
Team 13; Karyna Shypulia (BLR); Alina Dauranova (KAZ); Xue Shiwen (CHN); Diego Amaya (COL)	Mixed team sprint	DQ	

== See also ==
- China at the 2020 Summer Olympics
