= Andrew Longino (freestyle skier) =

Canadian freestyle skier (born 2002)

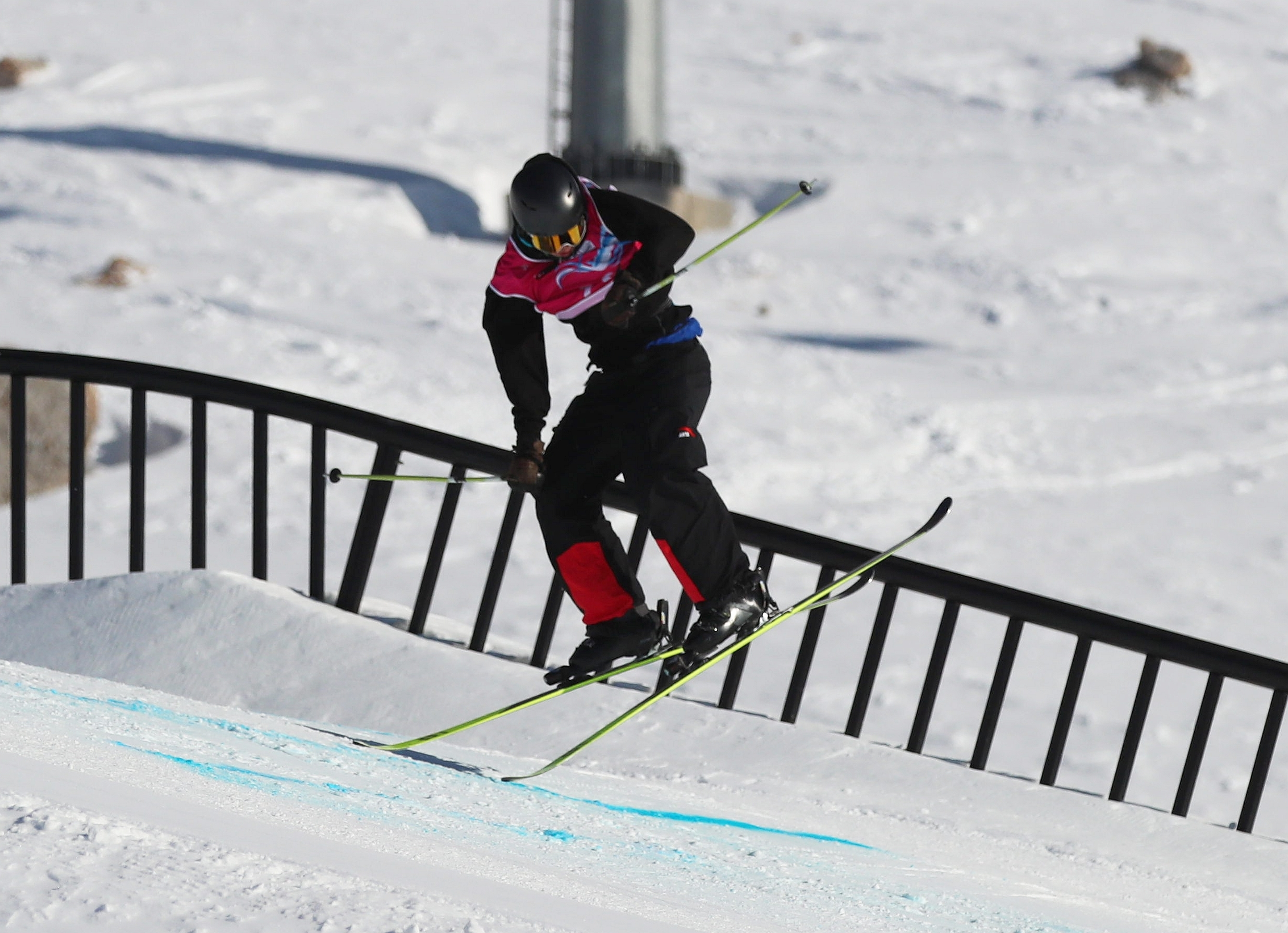

Personal information
- Nationality: Canada
- Born: July 18, 2002 (age 24) Calgary, Alberta, Canada

Sport
- Sport: Skiing
Medal record
Winter Youth Olympics
Gold medal – first place	2020 Lausanne	Boys' halfpipe
- Updated on December 25, 2025

Andrew Longino (born July 18, 2002) is a Canadian freestyle skier, competing in the halfpipe. Longino competed at the 2026 Winter Olympics and is a 2020 Youth Olympic champion in halfpipe.

== Career ==
Longino first competed for Canada at the 2020 Winter Youth Olympics in Lausanne, Switzerland, where he would go onto win the gold medal in the boys' halfpipe event. Longino was also named the country's flagbearer during the closing ceremony.

Longino has won two World Cup medals. During the first stop of the 2024-25 season in Cardona, New Zealand, Longino won bronze in the halfpipe event. Longino followed this up with another bronze during the 2025-2026 season at the Copper Mountain stop in the halfpipe event.
