= Caroline Ulrich =

Swiss ski mountaineer (born 2002)

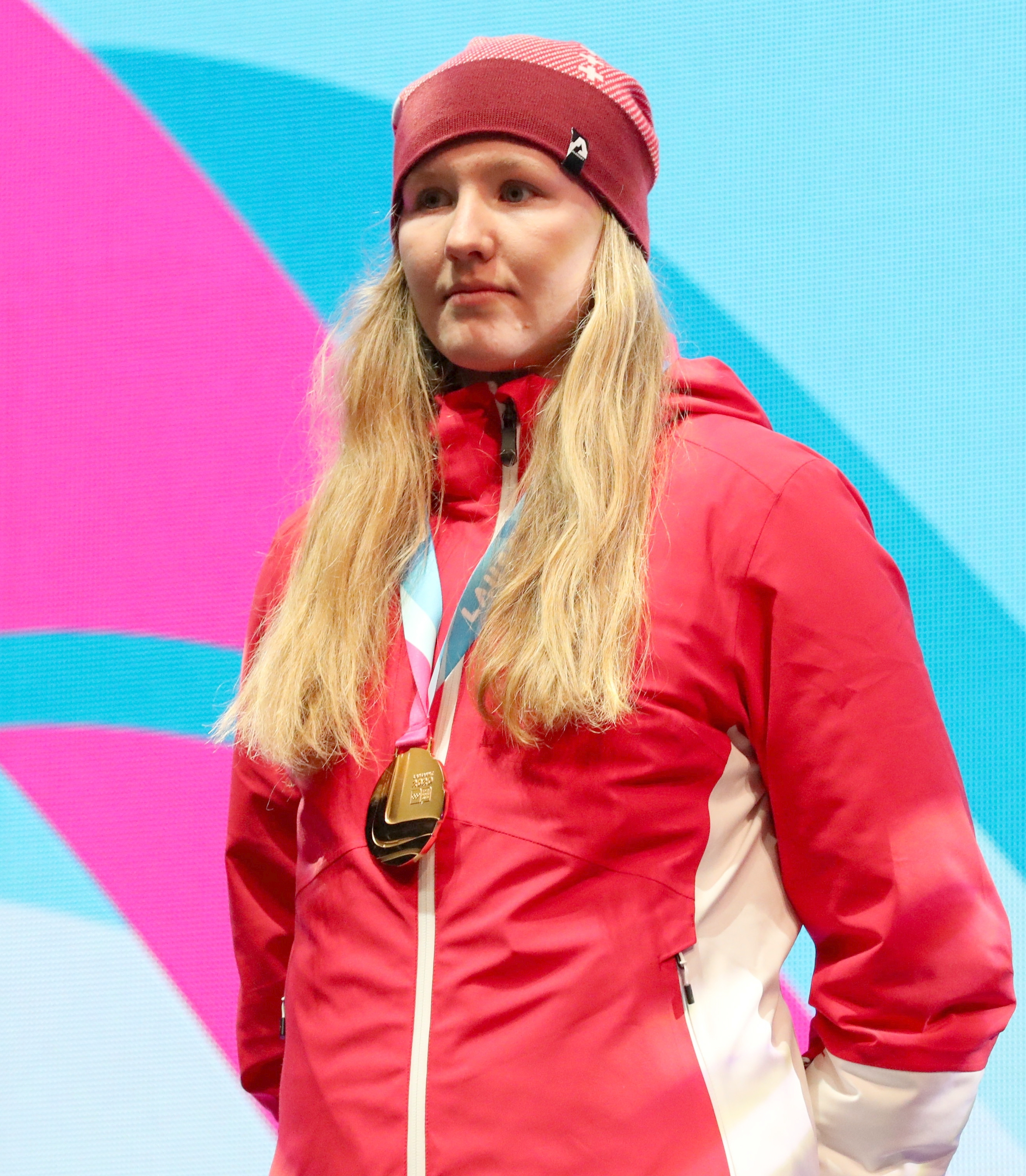

Personal information
- National team: Switzerland
- Born: 28 February 2002 (age 24) Vevey
- Occupation(s): Ski mountaineer and trail runner
- Height: 176 cm (5 ft 9 in)
- Other interests: Trail running

Sport
- Sport: Ski mountaineering
- League: International Ski Mountaineering Federation

Achievements and titles
- Highest world ranking: 6th

Caroline Ulrich (born 28 February 2002) is a Swiss ski mountaineer. She won two gold medals at the 2020 Youth Olympic Games in the team relay and the individual girls race. In 2022, in her first year out of youth competition, she won 14 out of 24 races that year. She has two gold medals at the ISMF World Cup, one at the Swiss National Championships, and has placed first at Montée de la Foilleuse three times. She is currently ranked 6th in the world for women by the International Ski Mountaineering Federation, and is the only competitor in the top ten to compete at the U23 level.

== Sports career ==
Ulrich began ski mountaineering by following her brother into the sport. Ski mountaineering involves athletes first climbing up a steep trail, with obstacles, then descending down the same trail on skis. Ulrich trains at Les Paccots in Switzerland. During the 2018 European Ski Mountaineering Championships, Ulrich won the individual joint start for her age group (cadet). She later won the silver medal in the sprint and the vertical competitions.

=== 2020 Winter Youth Olympics ===
Ulrich won the gold medal in Ski Mountaineering at the 2020 Youth Winter Olympics. She won the girl's individual event as well as a team gold medal with Switzerland in the mixed relay. She placed fifth in the sprint race.

=== U23 seasons ===
In her second year out of Youth competition in 2023, she won the first event of the 2023/2024 ski mountaineering world cup season in Val Thorens.

She had three wins in the 2024 ski mountaineering season. She took first place in the team race of the Morgins Yannick Ecoeur Trophy, then the top prize individually in the Swiss National Cup. In March, she won the sprint race at the ISMF World Cup 2024 in Schladming, Austria.

In addition to ski mountaineering, Ulrich is a trail runner. In 2024, she placed 60th out of over 2,000 participants in the Marathon du Mont Blanc.
