= Margot Ravinel =

French ski mountaineer (born 2002)

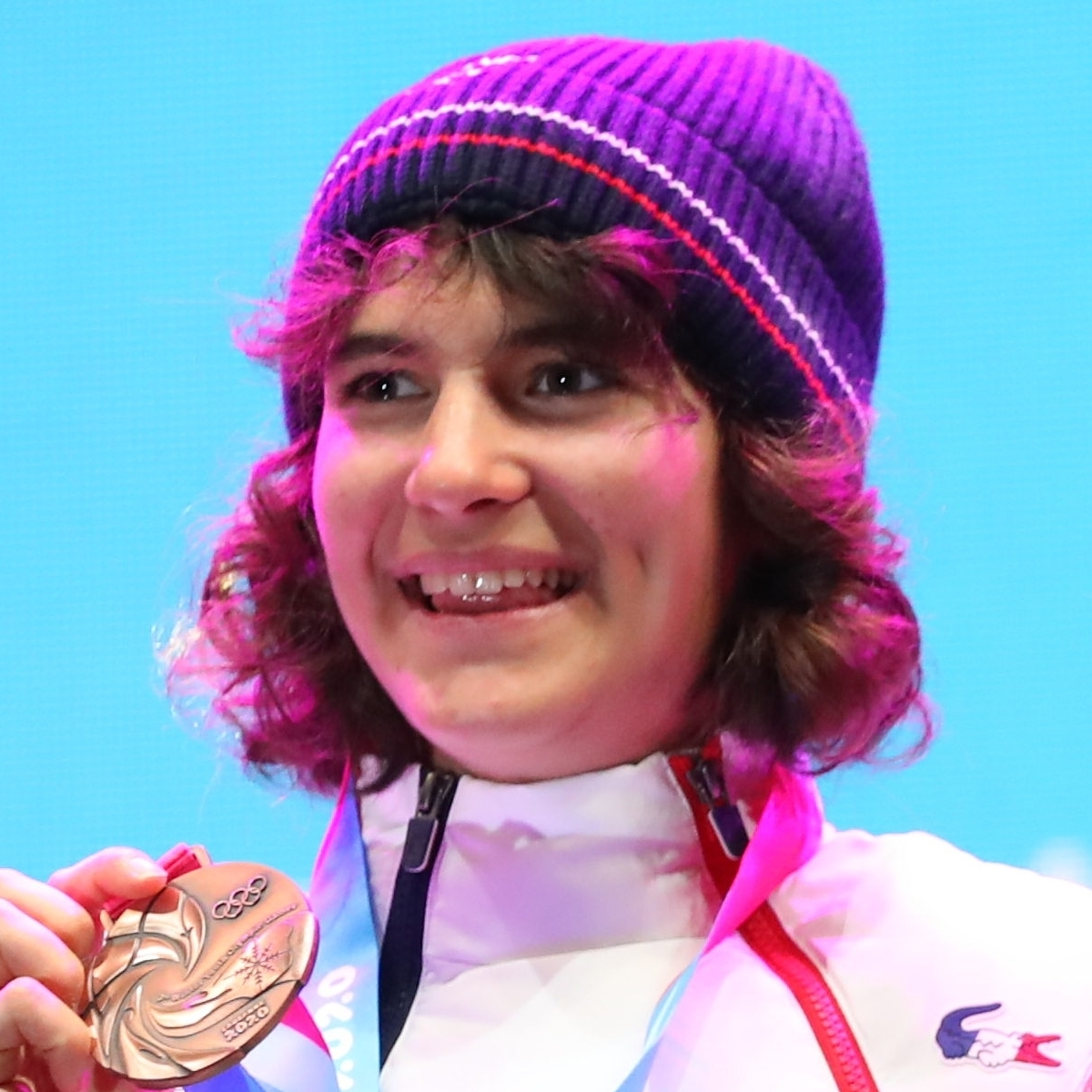
- Ravinel at the 2020 Winter Youth Olympics

Personal information
- Born: 7 June 2002 (age 24) Frimley, Surrey, England
- Height: 1.64 m (5 ft 5 in)
- Weight: 49 kg (108 lb)

Sport
- Country: France
- Sport: Ski mountaineering
Medal record
Women's ski mountaineering
Representing France
World University Games
Gold medal – first place	2025 Turin	Sprint race
Gold medal – first place	2025 Turin	Vertical race
Gold medal – first place	2025 Turin	Mixed relay
Youth Olympic Games
Silver medal – second place	2020 Lausanne	Mixed relay
Bronze medal – third place	2020 Lausanne	Individual race
Bronze medal – third place	2020 Lausanne	Sprint race

Margot Ravinel (French: [maʁɡo ʁavinɛl]; born 7 June 2002) is a French ski mountaineer.

== Career ==
Ravinel represented France at the 2020 Winter Youth Olympics and won a silver medal in the mixed relay with a time of 37:11. She also won a bronze medal in the individual race with a time of 1:00:28.95 and a bronze medal in the sprint race with a time of 3:25.85.

In January 2025, she competed at the 2025 Winter World University Games in ski mountaineering, an event making its debut at the FISU World University Games. She won a gold medal in the sprint race with a time 4:45.80, winning the first-ever ski mountaineering gold medal in FISU Games history.. She also won a gold medal the vertical race with a time 16:01.5, and the mixed relay, with a time of 42:45.86. She finished the FISU Games as the most decorated athlete with three gold medals. In March 2025, she competed at the 2025 World Championship of Ski Mountaineering and won a gold medal in the under-23 individual race with a time of 1:46:39.4.

During the opening race of the 2025–26 ISMF Ski Mountaineering World Cup on 7 December 2025, she earned her first career World Cup victory in the sprint race.
