= Switzerland at the 2020 Winter Youth Olympics =

- Flag of Switzerland
- IOC code: SUI
- NOC: Swiss Olympic Association

in Lausanne, Switzerland 9 January 2020 – 22 January 2020
- Medals Ranked 2nd: Gold 10 Silver 6 Bronze 8 Total 24

Winter Youth Olympics appearances
- 2012; 2016; 2020; 2024

Host nation Switzerland competed at the 2020 Winter Youth Olympics in Lausanne, Switzerland from 9 to 22 January 2020. In total athletes representing Switzerland won ten gold medals, six silver medals and eight bronze medals and the country finished in 2nd place in the medal table.

== Medalists ==
Medal	Name	Sport	Event	Date
Gold	Caroline Ulrich	Ski mountaineering	Girls' individual	10 January
Gold	Thomas Bussard	Ski mountaineering	Boys' individual	10 January
Gold	Amélie Klopfenstein	Alpine skiing	Girls' super-G	10 January
Gold	Amélie Klopfenstein	Alpine skiing	Girls' giant slalom	12 January
Gold	Caroline Ulrich; Thomas Bussard; Thibe Deseyn; Robin Bussard	Ski mountaineering	Mixed relay	14 January
Gold	Nubya Aeschlimann	Ice hockey	Girls' 3x3 mixed tournament	15 January
Gold	Siri Wigger	Cross-country skiing	Girls' cross-country cross	18 January
Gold	Marie Krista	Freestyle skiing	Girls' ski cross	19 January
Gold	Siri Wigger	Cross-country skiing	Girls' sprint	19 January
Gold	Valerio Jud	Snowboarding	Boys' snowboard cross	20 January
Gold	Anouk Dörig; Marie Krista; Valerio Jud; Robin Tissières	Snowboarding	Team ski-snowboard cross	21 January
Silver	Thibe Deseyn	Ski mountaineering	Girls' individual	10 January
Silver	Robin Bussard	Ski mountaineering	Boys' individual	10 January
Silver	Sandro Zurbrügg	Alpine skiing	Boys' giant slalom	13 January
Silver	Lena Volken	Alpine skiing	Girls' slalom	14 January
Silver	Luc Roduit	Alpine skiing	Boys' slalom	14 January
Silver	Jan Hornecker	Ice hockey	Boys' 3x3 mixed tournament	15 January
Silver	Angelina Hurschler	Ice hockey	Girls' 3x3 mixed tournament	15 January
Silver	Siri Wigger	Cross-country skiing	Girls' 5 kilometre classical	21 January
Bronze	Luc Roduit	Alpine skiing	Boys' super-G	10 January
Bronze	Amélie Klopfenstein	Alpine skiing	Girls' combined	11 January
Bronze	Luc Roduit	Alpine skiing	Boys' giant slalom	13 January
Bronze	Valerie Christmann	Ice hockey	Girls' 3x3 mixed tournament	15 January
Bronze	Bianca Gisler	Snowboarding	Girls' slopestyle	18 January
Bronze	Berenice Wicki	Snowboarding	Girls' halfpipe	20 January
Bronze	Anouk Dörig	Snowboarding	Girls' snowboard cross	20 January
Bronze	Nick Pünter	Snowboarding	Boys' slopestyle	20 January
Bronze	Livio Summermatter	Skeleton	Boys' skeleton	20 January

== Alpine skiing ==
Boys

Athlete	Event	Run 1		Run 2		Total	
Athlete	Event	Time	Rank	Time	Rank	Time	Rank
Silvano Gini	Super-G	—N/a				55.49	14
Silvano Gini	Combined	55.49	14	34.81	13	1:30.30	10
Silvano Gini	Giant slalom	DSQ					
Silvano Gini	Slalom						
Luc Roduit	Super-G	—N/a				54.76	3rd place, bronze medalist(s)
Luc Roduit	Combined	54.76	3	34.40	10	1:29.16	5
Luc Roduit	Giant slalom	1:04.68	8	1:04.21	3	2:08.89	3rd place, bronze medalist(s)
Luc Roduit	Slalom						
Sandro Zurbrügg	Super-G	—N/a				55.85	19
Sandro Zurbrügg	Combined	55.85	19	35.27	16	1:31.12	14
Sandro Zurbrügg	Giant slalom	1:04.64	7	1:04.21	3	2:08.85	2nd place, silver medalist(s)
Sandro Zurbrügg	Slalom						

Girls

Athlete	Event	Run 1		Run 2		Total	
Athlete	Event	Time	Rank	Time	Rank	Time	Rank
Delia Durrer	Super-G	—N/a				57.35	14
Delia Durrer	Combined	57.35	14	38.25	9	1:35.60	10
Delia Durrer	Giant slalom	1:07.10	17	1:05.18	18	2:12.28	15
Delia Durrer	Slalom						
Amélie Klopfenstein	Super-G	—N/a				56.27	1st place, gold medalist(s)
Amélie Klopfenstein	Combined	56.27	1	38.58	12	1:34.85	3rd place, bronze medalist(s)
Amélie Klopfenstein	Giant slalom	1:05.61	5	1:03.07	2	2:08.68	1st place, gold medalist(s)
Amélie Klopfenstein	Slalom						
Lena Volken	Super-G	—N/a				DNF	
Lena Volken	Combined	DNF					
Lena Volken	Giant slalom	1:05.80	7	1:03.61	4	2:09.41	6
Lena Volken	Slalom						

== Biathlon ==
Boys

Athlete	Event	Time	Misses	Rank
Noé In Albon	Sprint	22:13.0	4 (2+2)	42
Noé In Albon	Individual	41:25.0	8 (1+2+3+2)	65
Yanis Keller	Sprint	21:42.5	4 (2+2)	32
Yanis Keller	Individual	37:20.2	5 (0+3+1+1)	14
Jan Roth	Sprint	DSQ		
Jan Roth	Individual	39:32.9	4 (0+2+1+1)	45
Felix Ullmann	Sprint	21:29.8	1 (0+1)	28
Felix Ullmann	Individual	42:28.9	8 (3+1+3+1)	72

Girls

Athlete	Event	Time	Misses	Rank
Chiara Arnet	Sprint	20:14.6	1 (0+1)	25
Chiara Arnet	Individual	37:01.1	5 (1+0+1+3)	23
Lara Berwert	Sprint	20:45.0	2 (0+2)	40
Lara Berwert	Individual	37:07.4	5 (3+0+1+1)	24
Yara Burkhalter	Sprint	19:34.2	0 (0+0)	9
Yara Burkhalter	Individual	41:56.1	9 (2+2+2+3)	71
Marlene Perren	Sprint	19:50.5	1 (0+1)	13
Marlene Perren	Individual	38:57.8	7 (0+2+1+4)	46

Mixed

Athletes	Event	Time	Misses	Rank
Yara Burkhalter; Yanis Keller	Single mixed relay	42:43.7	1+10	4
Yara Burkhalter; Marlene Perren; Yanis Keller; Felix Ullmann	Mixed relay	1:17:43.1	5+12	13

== Curling ==
Mixed team

Team	Event	Group stage						Quarterfinal	Semifinal	Final / BM	
Team	Event	Opposition Score	Opposition Score	Opposition Score	Opposition Score	Opposition Score	Rank	Opposition Score	Opposition Score	Opposition Score	Rank
Jan Iseli; Xenia Schwaller; Maximilian Winz; Malin da Ros	Mixed team	China; W 5 – 3	Hungary; W 8 – 2	Germany; W 7 – 2	Denmark; W 6 – 4	Brazil; W 10 – 2	1 Q	Russia; L 5 – 7	Did not advance		6

Mixed doubles

Athletes	Event	Round of 48	Round of 24	Round of 12	Round of 6	Semifinals	Final / BM	
Athletes	Event	Opposition Result	Opposition Result	Opposition Result	Opposition Result	Opposition Result	Opposition Result	Rank
	Mixed doubles							

== Ski mountaineering ==
Boys

Athlete	Event	Time	Rank
Thomas Bussard	Individual	47:49.85	1st place, gold medalist(s)
Robin Bussard	Individual	49:16.54	2nd place, silver medalist(s)

Girls

Athlete	Event	Time	Rank
Caroline Ulrich	Individual	58:34.48	1st place, gold medalist(s)
Thibe Deseyn	Individual	59:38.58	2nd place, silver medalist(s)

== See also ==
- Switzerland at the 2020 Summer Olympics
