= Noah Warren (ice hockey) =

Canadian ice hockey player (born 2004)

- Born: July 15, 2004 (age 22) Montreal, Quebec, Canada
- Height: 6 ft 5 in (196 cm)
- Weight: 233 lb (106 kg; 16 st 9 lb)
- Position: Defenceman
- Shoots: Left
- NHL team: Anaheim Ducks
- NHL draft: 42nd overall, 2022; Anaheim Ducks
- Playing career: 2024–present

Noah Warren (born July 15, 2004) is a Canadian professional ice hockey defenceman for the Anaheim Ducks of the National Hockey League (NHL). He was drafted in the second round, 42nd overall, by the Ducks in the 2022 NHL entry draft.

== Playing career ==
Warren was drafted in the second round, 42nd overall, by the Anaheim Ducks in the 2022 NHL entry draft. He began his career with the Gatineau Olympiques of the Quebec Maritimes Junior Hockey League (QMJHL). In three seasons with Olympiques he recorded nine goals and 39 assists in 138 games from 2020 to 2023. On June 10, 2023, he was traded to the Victoriaville Tigres in exchange for three QMJHL Draft picks. On July 19, 2023, he signed a three-year, entry-level contract with the Ducks.

On September 30, 2024, he was assigned to the Ducks' AHL affiliate, the San Diego Gulls. During the 2024–25 season, in his rookie season, he recorded four assists in 60 games for the Gulls. During the 2025–26 season, he recorded two goals and ten assists in 61 games. On September 30, 2026, he was recalled by the Ducks.

== International play ==
Medal record

Ice hockey

Representing Canada

Winter Youth Olympics
Bronze medal – third place	2020 Lausanne	

Warren represented Canada at the 2020 Winter Youth Olympics where he was scoreless in four games and won a bronze medal. In December 2023, he was selected to represent Canada at the 2024 World Junior Ice Hockey Championships.

== Career statistics ==
=== Regular season and playoffs ===
			Regular season					Playoffs
Season	Team	League	GP	G	A	Pts	PIM	GP	G	A	Pts	PIM
2020–21	Gatineau Olympiques	QMJHL	29	1	3	4	6	4	0	1	1	0
2021–22	Gatineau Olympiques	QMJHL	62	5	19	24	52	7	0	1	1	4
2022–23	Gatineau Olympiques	QMJHL	47	3	17	20	35	—	—	—	—	—
2023–24	Victoriaville Tigres	QMJHL	50	6	7	13	35	14	0	8	8	4
2024–25	San Diego Gulls	AHL	60	0	4	4	38	—	—	—	—	—
2025–26	San Diego Gulls	AHL	61	2	10	12	26	2	0	1	1	0
AHL totals			121	2	14	16	64	2	0	1	1	0

=== International ===
Year	Team	Event	Result	GP	G	A	Pts	PIM
2024	Canada	WJC	5th	5	0	0	0	2
Junior totals				5	0	0	0	2
