= Canada at the 2020 Winter Youth Olympics =

- IOC code: CAN
- NOC: Canadian Olympic Committee
- Website: www.olympic.ca (in English and French)

in Lausanne, Switzerland January 10–22
- Competitors: 78 in 14 sports
- Flag bearer: Lauren Rajala
- Medals Ranked 15th: Gold 1 Silver 2 Bronze 5 Total 8

Winter Youth Olympics appearances
- 2012; 2016; 2020; 2024

Canada competed at the 2020 Winter Youth Olympics in Lausanne, Switzerland that were held on 9 to 22 January 2020.

== Medallists ==
Medals awarded to participants of mixed-NOC teams are represented in italics. These medals are not counted towards the individual NOC medal tally.

| Medal | Name | Sport | Event | Date |
|---|---|---|---|---|
| Gold | Andrew Longino | Freestyle skiing | Boys' halfpipe | 21 January |
| Gold | Nathan Young | Curling | Mixed doubles | 22 January |
| Silver | Caitlin Nash; Natalie Corless | Luge | Girls' doubles | 18 January |
| Silver | Liam Brearley | Snowboarding | Boys' slopestyle | 20 January |
| Bronze | Natalie D'Alessandro; Bruce Waddell | Figure skating | Team trophy | 15 January |
| Bronze | Florence Brunelle | Short track speed skating | Girls' 1000 metres | 18 January |
| Bronze | Florence Brunelle | Short track speed skating | Girls' 500 metres | 20 January |
| Bronze | Liam Brearley | Snowboarding | Boys' halfpipe | 21 January |
| Bronze | Canada men's national junior ice hockey team: Vincent Filion; Ty Nelson; Denton Mateychuk; Noah Warren; Mats Lindgren; Tristan Luneau; Matthew Jovanovic; Adam Fantilli; Matthew Savoie; Kocha Delic; Cedrick Guindon; Pano Fimis; Paul Ludwinski; Nate Danielson; Antonin Verreault; Justin Cote; Dylan Ernst | Ice hockey | Boys' tournament | 22 January |
| Bronze | Liam Brearley | Snowboarding | Boys' big air | 22 January |

== Alpine skiing ==
Boys

| Athlete | Event | Run 1 | | Run 2 | | Total | |
| Athlete | Event | Time | Rank | Time | Rank | Time | Rank |
|---|---|---|---|---|---|---|---|
| Louis Latulippe | Super-G | —N/a | | | | 58.24 | 39 |
| Louis Latulippe | Combined | 58.24 | 39 | 35.50 | 19 | 1:33.74 | 22 |
| Louis Latulippe | Giant slalom | DNF | | | | | |
| Louis Latulippe | Slalom | 38.43 | 15 | 40.96 | 11 | 1:39.39 | 10 |
| Mackenzie Wood | Super-G | —N/a | | | | 58.27 | 40 |
| Mackenzie Wood | Combined | 58.27 | 40 | DNF | | | |
| Mackenzie Wood | Giant slalom | 1:06.28 | 24 | DNF | | | |
| Mackenzie Wood | Slalom | 39.07 | 21 | DNF | | | |

Girls

| Athlete | Event | Run 1 | | Run 2 | | Total | |
| Athlete | Event | Time | Rank | Time | Rank | Time | Rank |
|---|---|---|---|---|---|---|---|
| Sarah Brown | Super-G | —N/a | | | | DNS | |
| Sarah Brown | Combined | DNS | | | | | |
| Sarah Brown | Giant slalom | 1:09.19 | 30 | DNF | | | |
| Sarah Brown | Slalom | DNF | | | | | |
| Alice Marchessault | Super-G | —N/a | | | | DNF | |
| Alice Marchessault | Combined | DNF | | | | | |
| Alice Marchessault | Giant slalom | DNF | | | | | |
| Alice Marchessault | Slalom | DSQ | | | | | |

Mixed

| Athlete | Event | Round of 16 | Quarterfinals | Semifinals | Final / BM | |
| Athlete | Event | Opposition Result | Opposition Result | Opposition Result | Opposition Result | Rank |
|---|---|---|---|---|---|---|
| Sarah Brown; Louis Latulippe | Team | France; L 0–4 | Did not advance | | | 15 |

== Biathlon ==
Boys

| Athlete | Event | Time | Misses | Rank |
|---|---|---|---|---|
| Ethan Algra | Sprint | 22:06.2 | 2 (2+0) | 40 |
| Ethan Algra | Individual | 38:53.7 | 4 (1+0+3+0) | 36 |
| Finn Berg | Sprint | 24:59.0 | 6 (3+3) | 84 |
| Finn Berg | Individual | 42:08.1 | 7 (2+1+3+1) | 69 |
| Lucas Sadesky | Sprint | 24:05.8 | 6 (3+3) | 77 |
| Lucas Sadesky | Individual | 44:41.3 | 11 (2+3+3+3) | 87 |

Girls

| Athlete | Event | Time | Misses | Rank |
|---|---|---|---|---|
| Pascale Paradis | Sprint | 20:28.6 | 4 (1+3) | 30 |
| Pascale Paradis | Individual | 37:49.3 | 7 (2+2+2+1) | 32 |
| Jenna Sherrington | Sprint | 19:50.6 | 1 (1+0) | 14 |
| Jenna Sherrington | Individual | 38:09.0 | 6 (1+2+1+2) | 37 |
| Naomi Walch | Sprint | 21:34.2 | 3 (1+2) | 52 |
| Naomi Walch | Individual | 40:49.4 | 8 (4+0+4+0) | 64 |

Mixed

| Athletes | Event | Time | Misses | Rank |
|---|---|---|---|---|
| Pascale Paradis; Ethan Algra | Single mixed relay | 44:10.7 | 0+10 | 11 |
| Jenna Sherrington; Naomi Walch; Finn Berg; Ethan Algra | Mixed relay | 1:20:47.1 | 5+17 | 18 |

== Bobsleigh ==
| Athlete | Event | Run 1 | | Run 2 | | Total | |
| Athlete | Event | Time | Rank | Time | Rank | Time | Rank |
|---|---|---|---|---|---|---|---|
| Colton Dagenais | Boys' | 1:15.67 | 17 | 1:15.14 | 15 | 2:30.81 | 17 |
| Emma Johnsen | Girls' | 1:16.88 | 17 | 1:15.75 | 14 | 2:32.63 | 17 |

== Cross-country skiing ==
Boys

| Athlete | Event | Qualification | | Quarterfinal | | Semifinal | | Final | |
| Athlete | Event | Time | Rank | Time | Rank | Time | Rank | Time | Rank |
|---|---|---|---|---|---|---|---|---|---|
| Derek Deuling | 10 km classic | —N/a | | | | | | 28:30.6 | 18 |
| Derek Deuling | Free sprint | 3:23.28 | 19 Q | 3:28.57 | 4 | Did not advance | | | |
| Derek Deuling | Cross-country cross | 4:42.31 | 44 | Did not advance | | | | | |
| Sasha Masson | 10 km classic | —N/a | | | | | | 30:27.1 | 47 |
| Sasha Masson | Free sprint | 3:30.55 | 38 | Did not advance | | | | | |
| Sasha Masson | Cross-country cross | 4:39.67 | 38 | Did not advance | | | | | |

Girls

| Athlete | Event | Qualification | | Quarterfinal | | Semifinal | | Final | |
| Athlete | Event | Time | Rank | Time | Rank | Time | Rank | Time | Rank |
|---|---|---|---|---|---|---|---|---|---|
| Jasmine Drolet | 5 km classic | —N/a | | | | | | 15:30.0 | 17 |
| Jasmine Drolet | Free sprint | 2:57.95 | 29 Q | 2:55.43 | 4 | Did not advance | | | |
| Jasmine Drolet | Cross-country cross | 5:27.71 | 34 | Did not advance | | | | | |
| Liliane Gagnon | 5 km classic | —N/a | | | | | | 15:52.5 | 27 |
| Liliane Gagnon | Free sprint | 2:52.38 | 17 Q | 2:53.86 | 5 | Did not advance | | | |
| Liliane Gagnon | Cross-country cross | 5:22.05 | 22 Q | —N/a | | 5:22.56 | 10 | Did not advance | |

== Curling ==
Canada qualified a mixed team of four athletes.

Mixed team

| Team | Event | Group stage | | | | | | Quarterfinal | Semifinal | Final / BM | |
| Team | Event | Opposition Score | Opposition Score | Opposition Score | Opposition Score | Opposition Score | Rank | Opposition Score | Opposition Score | Opposition Score | Rank |
|---|---|---|---|---|---|---|---|---|---|---|---|
| Nathan Young; Emily Deschenes; Jaedon Neuert; Lauren Rajala | Mixed team | Russia; W 7 – 4 | Poland; W 6 – 4 | South Korea; W 6 – 3 | Spain; W 9 - 3 | Estonia; W 10 - 2 | 1 Q | Japan; L 4 - 5 | Did not advance | | 7 |

Mixed doubles

| Athletes | Event | Round of 48 | Round of 24 | Round of 12 | Round of 6 | Semifinals | Final / BM | |
| Athletes | Event | Opposition Result | Opposition Result | Opposition Result | Opposition Result | Opposition Result | Opposition Result | Rank |
|---|---|---|---|---|---|---|---|---|
| Emily Deschenes (CAN); Oriol Castó (ESP) | Mixed doubles | Cid (BRA) / Walker (NZL); W 10–9 | Vergnaud (FRA) / Grunde Burås (NOR); L 2–8 | Did not advance | | | | |
| Kaitlin Murphy (USA); Jaedon Neuert (CAN) | Mixed doubles | Farries (GBR) / Polat (TUR); W 8–4 | Gregori (SLO) / Winz (SUI); L 6–8 | Did not advance | | | | |
| Lauren Rajala (CAN); Bine Sever (SLO) | Mixed doubles | Beitone (FRA) / Lysakov (RUS); L 9–10 | Did not advance | | | | | |
| Laura Nagy (HUN); Nathan Young (CAN) | Mixed doubles | Norrlander (SWE) / Kilian Thune (DEN); W 11–5 | Liu (CHN) / Eser (TUR); W 8–4 | Mitchell (GBR) / Jiral (CZE); W 7–4 | Kobayashi (JPN) / Tuaz (FRA); W 8–1 | Kobayashi (JPN) / Tuaz (FRA); W 6–2 | Beitone (FRA) / Lysakov (RUS); W 9–5 | 1st place, gold medalist(s) |

== Figure skating ==
Six Canadian figure skaters achieved quota places for Canada based on the results of the 2019 World Junior Figure Skating Championships. Two more Canadian figure skaters achieved quota places at the Pair skating event based on the results of the 2019–20 ISU Junior Grand Prix ranking.

Singles

| Athlete | Event | SP | | FS | | Total | |
| Athlete | Event | Points | Rank | Points | Rank | Points | Rank |
|---|---|---|---|---|---|---|---|
| Aleksa Rakic | Boys' singles | 70.96 | 4 | 134.27 | 4 | 205.23 | 4 |
| Catherine Carle | Girls' singles | 49.57 | 12 | 93.85 | 11 | 143.42 | 11 |

Couples

| Athletes | Event | SP/SD | | FS/FD | | Total | |
| Athletes | Event | Points | Rank | Points | Rank | Points | Rank |
|---|---|---|---|---|---|---|---|
| Brooke McIntosh / Brandon Toste | Pairs | 49.38 | 5 | 96.77 | 4 | 146.15 | 4 |
| Natalie D'Alessandro / Bruce Waddell | Ice dancing | 59.61 | 3 | 91.91 | 5 | 151.52 | 4 |
| Miku Makita / Tyler Gunara | Ice dancing | 58.47 | 4 | 90.42 | 6 | 148.89 | 5 |

Mixed NOC team trophy

| Athletes | Event | Free skate/Free dance | | | | | |
| Athletes | Event | Ice dance | Pairs | Girls | Boys | Total | |
| Athletes | Event | Points Team points | Points Team points | Points Team points | Points Team points | Points | Rank |
|---|---|---|---|---|---|---|---|
| Team Determination; Katarina Wolfkostin / Jeffrey Chen (USA); Brooke McIntosh / Brandon Toste (CAN); Nella Pelkonen (FIN); Cha Young-hyun (KOR) | Team trophy | 90.41; 5 | 96.73; 5 | 91.27; 2 | 133.13; 6 | 18 | 4 |
| Team Discovery; Célina Fradji / Jean-Hans Fourneaux (FRA); Apollinariia Panfilova / Dmitry Rylov (RUS); Cathérine Carle (CAN); Nikolaj Memola (ITA) | Team trophy | 75.86; 2 | 126.49; 8 | 91.22; 1 | 112.27; 4 | 15 | 6 |
| Team Hope; Miku Makita / Tyler Gunara (CAN); Letizia Roscher / Luis Schuster (GER); Maïa Mazzara (FRA); Liam Kapeikis (USA) | Team trophy | 89.87; 4 | 78.24; 1 | 103.36; 5 | 117.28; 4 | 14 | 8 |
| Team Vision; Natalie D'Alessandro / Bruce Waddell (CAN); Sofiia Nesterova / Artem Darenskyi (UKR); Regina Schermann (HUN); Andrei Mozalev (RUS) | Team trophy | 95.73; 6 | 86.53; 2 | 95.37; 3 | 154.97; 7 | 18 | 3rd place, bronze medalist(s) |

== Freestyle skiing ==
Ski cross

| Athlete | Event | Group heats | | Semifinal | Final |
| Athlete | Event | Points | Rank | Position | Position |
|---|---|---|---|---|---|
| Charlie Lang | Boys' ski cross | 12 | 9 | Did not advance | |
| Jack Morrow | Boys' ski cross | 14 | 7 | Did not advance | |
| Marie-Pier Brunet | Girls' ski cross | 18 | 3 Q | 4 SF | 5 |
| Sage Stefani | Girls' ski cross | 16 | 5 | Did not advance | |

Slopestyle & Big Air

| Athlete | Event | Qualification | | | | Final | | | | |
| Athlete | Event | Run 1 | Run 2 | Best | Rank | Run 1 | Run 2 | Run 3 | Best | Rank |
|---|---|---|---|---|---|---|---|---|---|---|
| Steven Kahnert | Boys' big air | 14.25 | 17.75 | 17.75 | 24 | Did not advance | | | | |
| Steven Kahnert | Boys' halfpipe | 56.00 | 55.33 | 56.00 | 8 Q | 24.00 | 65.66 | 24.66 | 65.66 | 8 |
| Steven Kahnert | Boys' slopestyle | 8.66 | 4.66 | 8.66 | 26 | Did not advance | | | | |
| Andrew Longino | Boys' big air | 33.75 | 50.00 | 50.00 | 21 | Did not advance | | | | |
| Andrew Longino | Boys' halfpipe | 72.00 | 76.00 | 76.00 | 3 Q | 87.66 | 90.66 | 94.00 | 94.00 | 1st place, gold medalist(s) |
| Andrew Longino | Boys' slopestyle | 55.66 | 17.66 | 55.66 | 17 | Did not advance | | | | |
| Brayden Willmott | Boys' big air | DNS | | | | | | | | |
| Brayden Willmott | Boys' slopestyle | 24.66 | 16.66 | 24.66 | 24 | Did not advance | | | | |
| Skye Clarke | Girls' big air | DNS | | | | | | | | |
| Skye Clarke | Girls' slopestyle | DNS | | | | | | | | |
| Rylee Hackler | Girls' big air | DNS | | | | | | | | |
| Rylee Hackler | Girls' halfpipe | 39.00 | 39.66 | 39.66 | 13 | Did not advance | | | | |
| Rylee Hackler | Girls' slopestyle | 64.75 | 21.25 | 64.75 | 6 Q | 9.50 | 12.75 | 65.00 | 65.00 | 6 |
| Emma Morozumi | Girls' halfpipe | 55.66 | 18.66 | 55.66 | 8 Q | 51.00 | 52.33 | 44.33 | 52.33 | 8 |

== Ice hockey ==
=== Boys' tournament ===
Summary

Key:

- OT – Overtime
- GWS – Match decided by penalty-shootout

| Team | Event | Group stage | | | Semifinal | Final | |
| Team | Event | Opposition Score | Opposition Score | Rank | Opposition Score | Opposition Score | Rank |
|---|---|---|---|---|---|---|---|
| Canada boys' | Boys' tournament | Russia; L 2–6 | Denmark; W 6–0 | 2 Q | United States; L 1–2 | Finland; W 4–2 | 3rd place, bronze medalist(s) |

Team roster

- Justin Cote
- Nate Danielson
- Dylan Ernst
- Adam Fantilli
- Vincent Filion
- Pano Fimis
- Conor Geekie
- Cedrick Guindon
- Matthew Jovanovic
- Mats Lukas Lindgren
- Paul Ludwinski
- Tristan Luneau
- Denton Mateychuk
- Ty Nelson
- Matthew Savoie
- Antonin Verreault
- Noah Warren

== Luge ==
Girls

| Athlete | Event | Run 1 | | Run 2 | | Total | |
| Athlete | Event | Time | Rank | Time | Rank | Time | Rank |
|---|---|---|---|---|---|---|---|
| Kailey Allan | Singles | 55.704 | 10 | 55.211 | 6 | 1:50.915 | 7 |
| Caitlin Nash | Singles | 55.483 | 5 | 55.075 | 4 | 1:50.558 | 4 |
| Natalie Corless; Caitlin Nash | Doubles | 56.294 | 4 | 56.415 | 2 | 1:52.709 | 2nd place, silver medalist(s) |

Mixed team relay

| Athlete | Event | Girls' singles | | Boys' singles | | Doubles | | Total | |
| Athlete | Event | Time | Rank | Time | Rank | Time | Rank | Time | Rank |
|---|---|---|---|---|---|---|---|---|---|
| Kailey Allan (CAN); Alex Gufler (ITA); Caitlin Nash (CAN); Natalie Corless (CAN) | Team relay | 57.718 | 4 | 58.918 | 4 | 1:00.991 | 6 | 2:57.627 | 4 |

== Short track speed skating ==
Two Canadian skaters achieved quota places for Canada based on the results of the 2019 World Junior Short Track Speed Skating Championships.

| Athlete | Event | Heats | | Quarterfinal | | Semifinal | | Final | |
| Athlete | Event | Time | Rank | Time | Rank | Time | Rank | Time | Rank |
|---|---|---|---|---|---|---|---|---|---|
| Felix Pigeon | Boys' 500 m | 42.140 | 3 | Did not advance | | | | | |
| Felix Pigeon | Boys' 1000 m | 1:34.547 | 2 Q | 1:31.925 | 3 | Did not advance | | | |
| Florence Brunelle | Girls' 500 m | 45.408 | 1 Q | 44.389 | 1 Q | 44.053 | 2 FA | 45.314 | 3rd place, bronze medalist(s) |
| Florence Brunelle | Girls' 1000 m | 1:38.671 | 2 Q | 1:34.974 | 1 Q | DNF | ADV A | 1:30.024 | 3rd place, bronze medalist(s) |

== Skeleton ==
| Athlete | Event | Run 1 | | Run 2 | | Total | |
| Athlete | Event | Time | Rank | Time | Rank | Time | Rank |
|---|---|---|---|---|---|---|---|
| Ryan Kuehn | Boys' | 1:11.55 | 14 | 1:11.65 | 15 | 2:23.20 | 14 |
| Hallie Clarke | Girls' | 1:12.95 | 12 | 1:13.25 | 13 | 2:26.20 | 12 |

== Ski jumping ==
Boys

| Athlete | Event | First round | | | Final | | | Total | |
| Athlete | Event | Distance | Points | Rank | Distance | Points | Rank | Points | Rank |
|---|---|---|---|---|---|---|---|---|---|
| Noah Rolseth | Normal hill | 52.0 | 40.4 | 36 | 58.0 | 75.3 | 33 | 115.7 | 36 |
| Stephane Tremblay | Normal hill | 72.0 | 81.7 | 28 | 66.5 | 71.3 | 34 | 153.0 | 30 |

== Ski mountaineering ==
Boys

| Athlete | Event | Time | Rank |
|---|---|---|---|
| Findlay Eyre | Individual | 1:00:32.98 | 21 |

Girls

| Athlete | Event | Time | Rank |
|---|---|---|---|
| Emma Chlepkova | Individual | 1:10:10.95 | 15 |

Sprint

| Athlete | Event | Qualification | | Quarterfinal | | Semifinal | | Final | |
| Athlete | Event | Time | Rank | Time | Rank | Time | Rank | Time | Rank |
|---|---|---|---|---|---|---|---|---|---|
| Findlay Eyre | Boys' sprint | 3:17.83 | 21 | 3:05.64 | 6 | Did not advance | | | |
| Ema Chelpkova | Girls' sprint | 4:07.71 | 19 | 3:33.29 | 2 Q | 5:10.65 | 6 | Did not advance | |

Mixed

| Athlete | Event | Time | Rank |
|---|---|---|---|
| World 1 Ema Chlepkova (CAN); Trym Dalset Lødøen (NOR); Roksana Saveh Shemshaki (IRI); Findlay Eyre (CAN) | Mixed relay | 41:44 | 11 |

== Snowboarding ==
Snowboard cross

| Athlete | Event | Group heats | | Semifinal | Final |
| Athlete | Event | Points | Rank | Position | Position |
|---|---|---|---|---|---|
| Tristan Bell | Boys' snowboard cross | 12 | 9 | Did not advance | |
| Jacon Walper | Boys' snowboard cross | 12 | 8 | Did not advance | |
| Bridget MacLean | Girls' snowboard cross | 1 | 14 | Did not advance | |
| Maxeen Thibeault | Girls' snowboard cross | 4 | 13 | Did not advance | |

Halfpipe, Slopestyle, & Big Air

| Athlete | Event | Qualification | | | | Final | | | | |
| Athlete | Event | Run 1 | Run 2 | Best | Rank | Run 1 | Run 2 | Run 3 | Best | Rank |
|---|---|---|---|---|---|---|---|---|---|---|
| Liam Brearley | Boys' big air | 84.00 | 73.50 | 84.00 | 4 Q | 91.25 | 92.00 | 32.25 | 183.25 | 3rd place, bronze medalist(s) |
| Liam Brearley | Boys' halfpipe | 80.66 | 83.33 | 83.33 | 4 Q | 82.00 | 79.00 | 32.66 | 82.00 | 3rd place, bronze medalist(s) |
| Liam Brearley | Boys' slopestyle | 81.00 | 9.00 | 81.00 | 4 Q | 85.33 | 64.00 | 39.00 | 85.33 | 2nd place, silver medalist(s) |
| William Buffey | Boys' slopestyle | 59.33 | 65.00 | 65.00 | 8 Q | DNS | | | | |
| Liam Gill | Boys' big air | 67.25 | 70.75 | 70.75 | 8 Q | 75.75 | 13.00 | 12.25 | 88.75 | 8 |
| Liam Gill | Boys' halfpipe | 15.00 | 50.00 | 50.00 | 13 | Did not advance | | | | |
| Liam Gill | Boys' slopestyle | 69.00 | 17.00 | 69.00 | 6 Q | 21.00 | 23.33 | 18.66 | 23.33 | 11 |
| Seth Strobel | Boys' halfpipe | 16.33 | 45.00 | 45.00 | 14 | Did not advance | | | | |
| Andie Gendron | Girls' big air | DNS | | | | | | | | |
| Andie Gendron | Girls' slopestyle | 35.25 | 26.25 | 35.25 | 11 Q | 19.50 | 16.25 | 28.50 | 28.50 | 9 |
| Kianah Hyatt | Girls' halfpipe | 24.33 | 24.33 | 24.33 | 14 | Did not advance | | | | |
| Kamilla Kozuback | Girls' big air | 42.00 | 35.66 | 42.00 | 11 Q | 23.75 | 53.25 | 19.00 | 72.25 | 8 |
| Kamilla Kozuback | Girls' halfpipe | 44.00 | 44.33 | 44.33 | 9 | Did not advance | | | | |
| Kamilla Kozuback | Girls' slopestyle | 26.00 | 11.50 | 26.00 | 14 | Did not advance | | | | |
| Juliette Pelchat | Girls' big air | DNS | | | | | | | | |
| Juliette Pelchat | Girls' slopestyle | 12.00 | 12.75 | 12.75 | 19 | Did not advance | | | | |

== See also ==
- Canada at the 2020 Summer Olympics
