= Ice hockey at the 2020 Winter Youth Olympics – Boys' tournament =

2020 Winter Youth Olympics – Boys' tournament
Tournament details
- Host country: Switzerland
- Venue: 1 (in 1 host city)
- Dates: 18–22 January
- Teams: 6

Final positions
- Champions: Russia (1st title)
- Runners-up: United States
- Third place: Canada
- Fourth place: Finland

Tournament statistics
- Games played: 10
- Goals scored: 72 (7.2 per game)
- Attendance: 68,800 (6,880 per game)
- Scoring leader: (Russia) Matvei Michkov (14 points)

The boys' ice hockey tournament at the 2020 Winter Youth Olympics was held from 18 to 22 January at the Vaudoise Aréna in Lausanne, Switzerland.

The Russian team won its first Youth Olympics gold medal, outscoring its opponents 29–3 throughout the tournament.

== Preliminary round ==
All times are local (UTC+1).

=== Group A ===
Pos	Team	Pld	W	SOW	SOL	L	GF	GA	GD	Pts	Qualification
1	United States	2	2	0	0	0	15	7	+8	6	Semifinals
2	Finland	2	1	0	0	1	7	8	−1	3	Semifinals
3	Switzerland (H)	2	0	0	0	2	3	10	−7	0	

Source: Lausanne2020
(H) Host

18 January 2020; 20:00	United States	7–5 (3–1, 2–1, 2–3)	Finland	Vaudoise aréna Attendance: 6,500

Game reference

Dylan Silverstein
Goalies
Topias Leinonen
Referees:
(Czech Republic) Jan Jaroš
(Russia) Igor Prusov
Linesmen:
(Switzerland) Eric Cattaneo
(Russia) Ilia Kolyasnikov

Stramel (McGroarty, Snuggerud) – 00:29	1–0
Brindley (Nazar) – 01:10	2–0
Howard (Duke, Lucius) – 06:22	3–0
	3–1	10:31 – Laakso (Lassila)
Nazar – 19:02	4–1
	4–2	20:26 – Sulku (Laakso, Lassila) (PP)
Howard (Fleming) – 25:25	5–2
	5–3	32:24 – Sulku (Lassila, Kaskimäki) (PP)
Howard – 37:44	6–3
Stramel (Duke, Borgesi) (PP) – 40:10	7–3
	7–4	41:15 – Lassila (Hokkanen, Nyman)
	7–5	41:42 – Sulku (Lassila, Kemell)

16.5 min
Penalties
19 min
32
Shots
28

19 January 2020; 20:00	Switzerland	2–8 (1–3, 0–1, 1–4)	United States	Vaudoise aréna Attendance: 7,800

Game reference

Alessio Beglieri
Valentino Zaetta
Goalies

Referees:
(Sweden) Filip Eriksson
(Czech Republic) Jan Jaroš
Linesmen:
(Russia) Ilia Kolyasnikov
(Slovakia) Juraj Konc

Greuter (Taibel) – 00:29	1–0
	1–1	02:44 – Howard (Lucius, Duke) (PP)
	1–2	05:30 – Howard (Brzustewicz, Hutson) (PP)
	1–3	10:24 – Hutson (PS)
	1–4	15:41 – Nazar (Chesley, Brindley)
	1–5	31:24 – Gauthier (Nazar, Brzustewicz)
	1–6	34:18 – McGroarty (Chesley)
Füllemann (Comolli, Reinhard) (PP) – 40:57	2–6
	2–7	41:48 – Howard (Fleming)
	2–8	42:48 – Chesley (McGroarty, Snuggerud)

6 min
Penalties
19 min
19
Shots
39

20 January 2020; 20:00	Finland	2–1 (1–0, 0–0, 1–1)	Switzerland	Vaudoise aréna Attendance: 8,200

Game reference

Topias Leinonen
Goalies
Alessio Beglieri
Referees:
(Hungary) Zsombor Pálkövi
(Russia) Igor Prusov
Linesmen:
(United States) Shane Gustafson
(Russia) Ilia Kolyasnikov

Rönni (Nyman, Hynninen) (PP) – 14:35	1–0
	1–1	33:45 – Füllemann (Comolli, Offner) (PP)
Männistö (Salin) – 44:00	2–1

80.5 min
Penalties
94 min
35
Shots
18

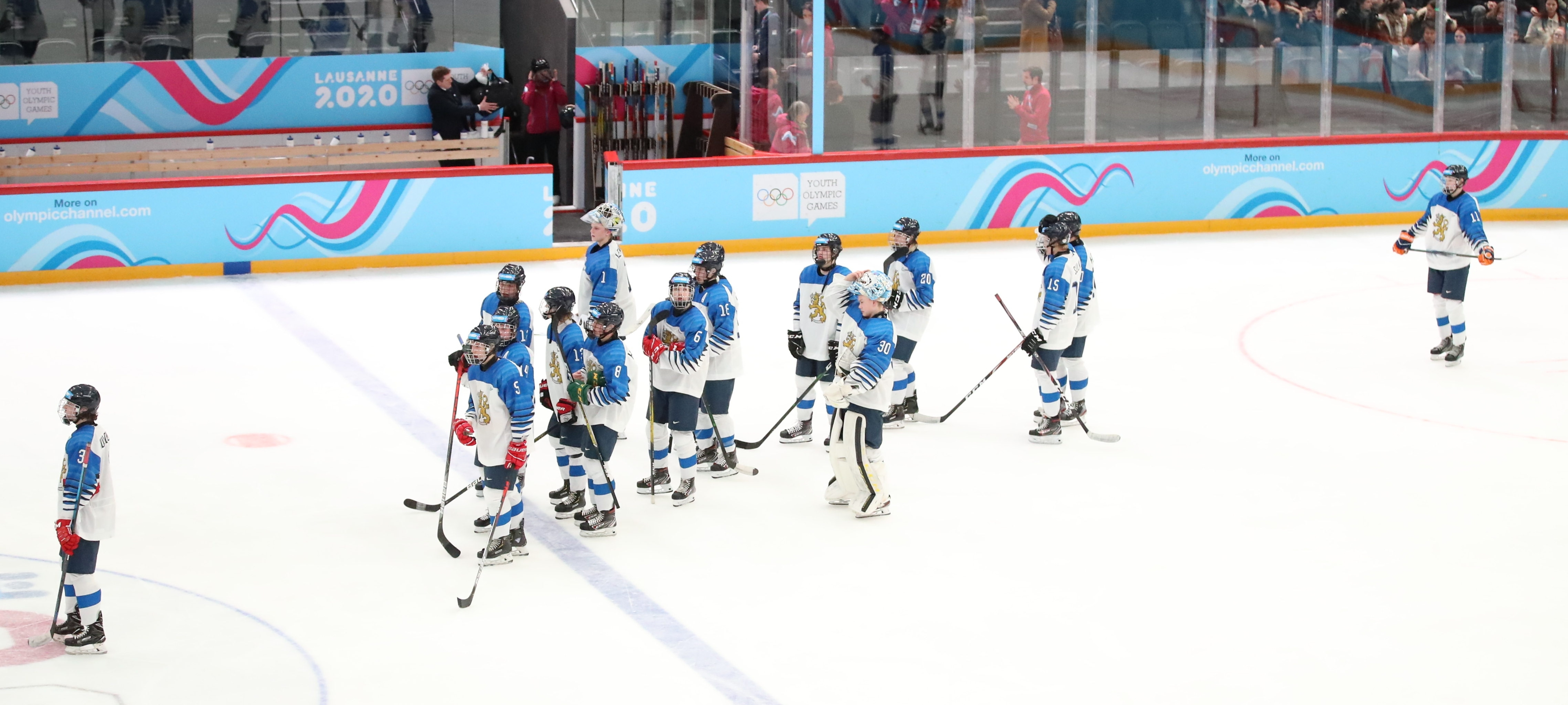
Team Finland

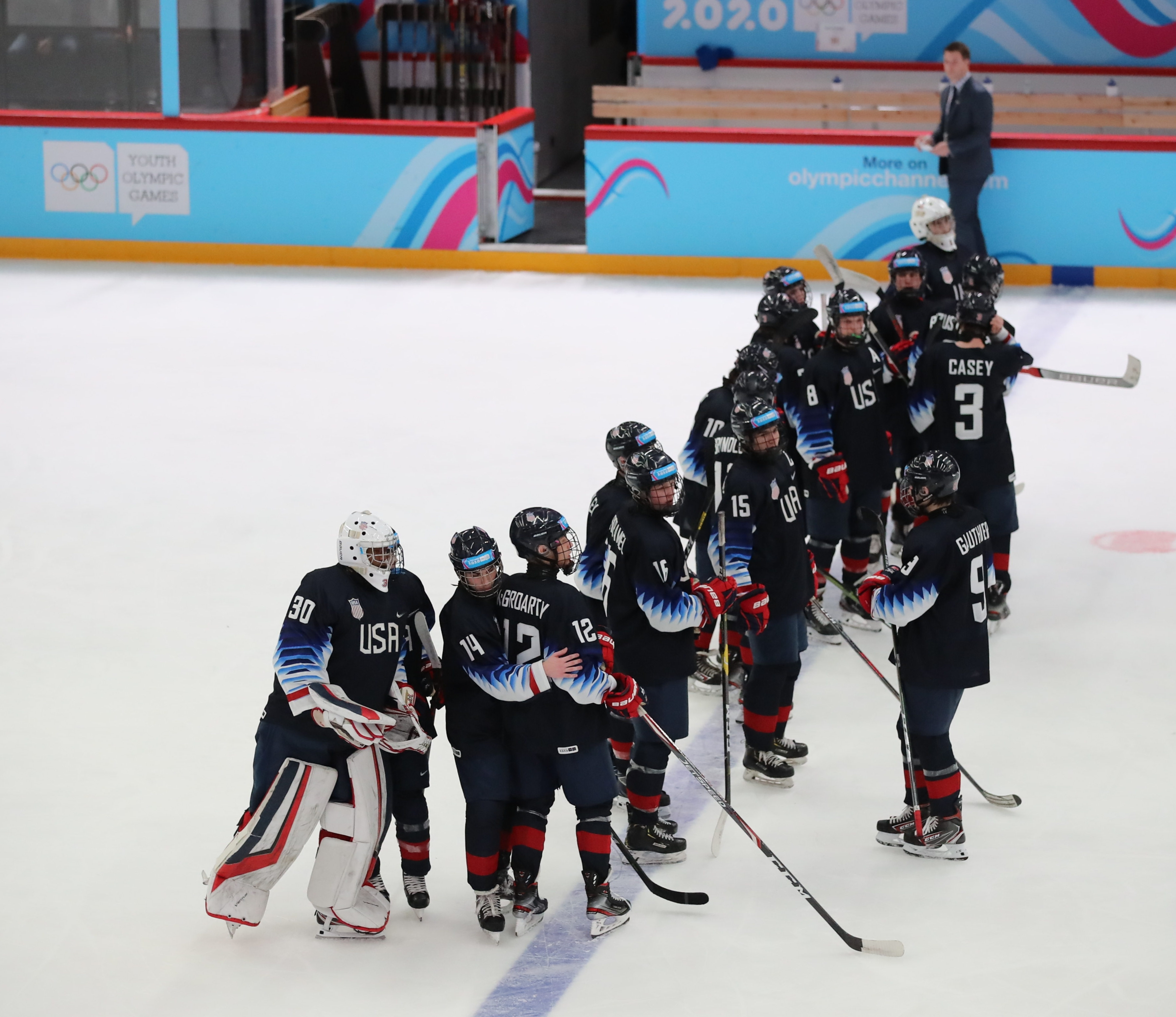
Team United States

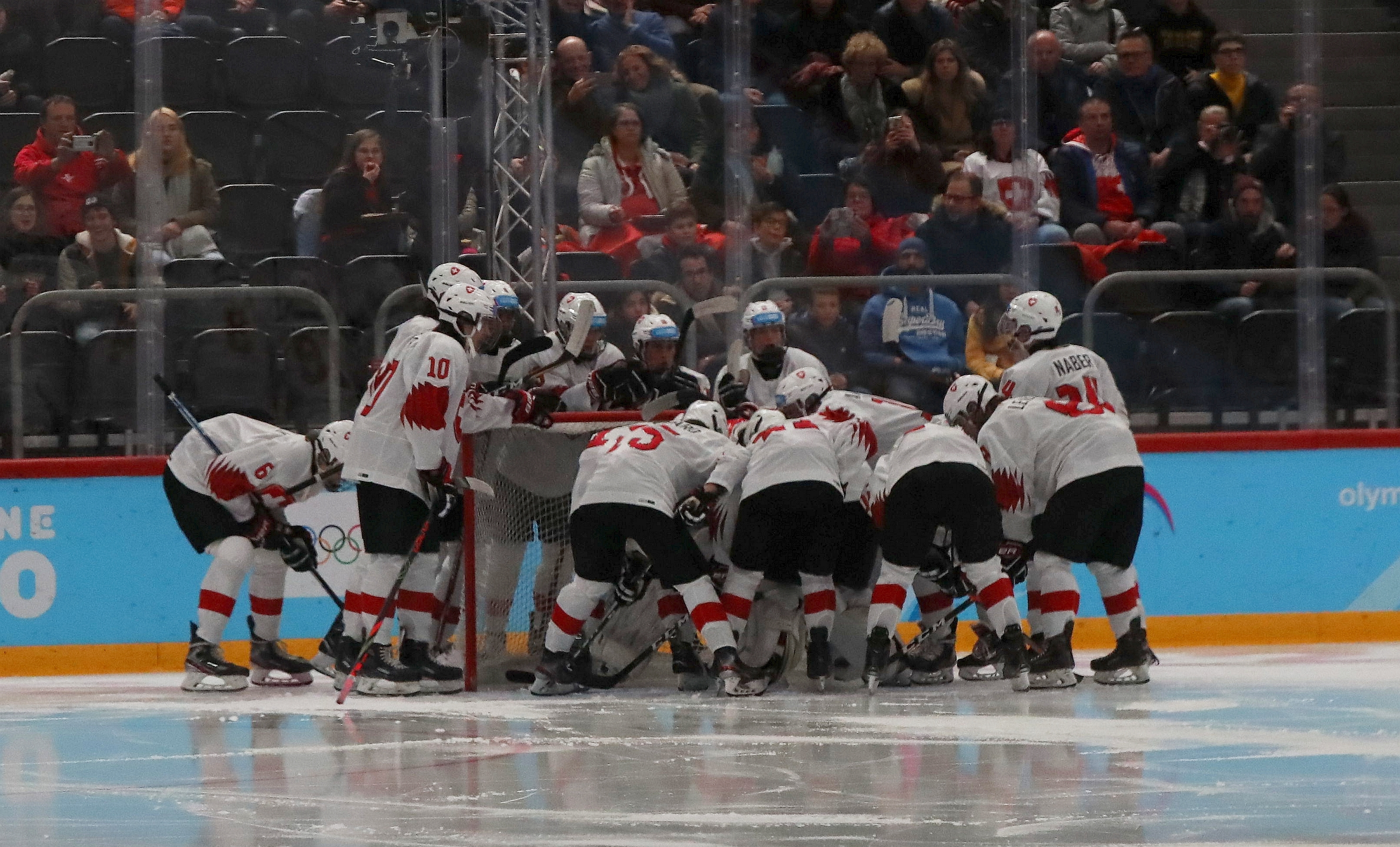
Team Switzerland

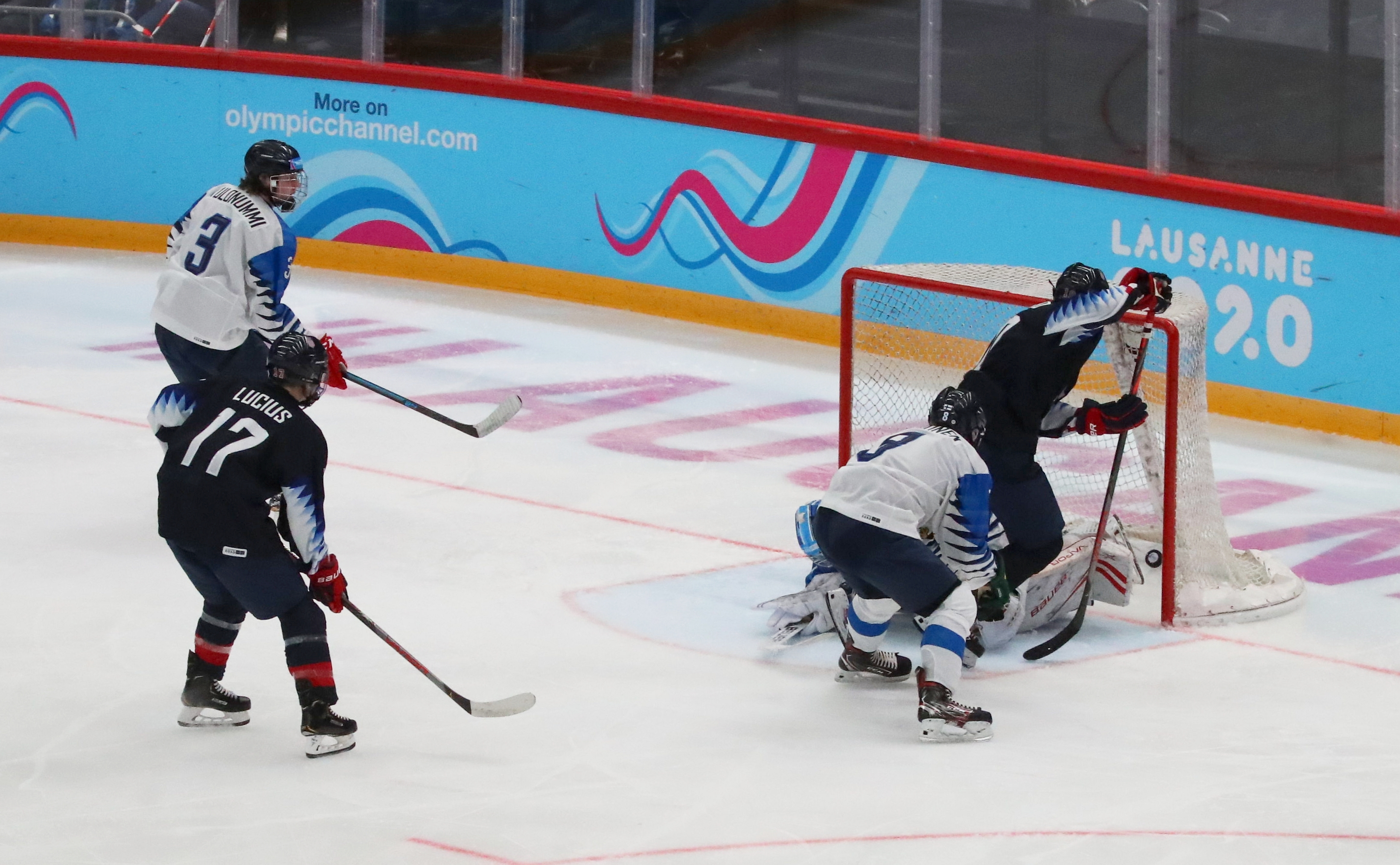
Game-winning goal of Team United States in the match versus Team Finland

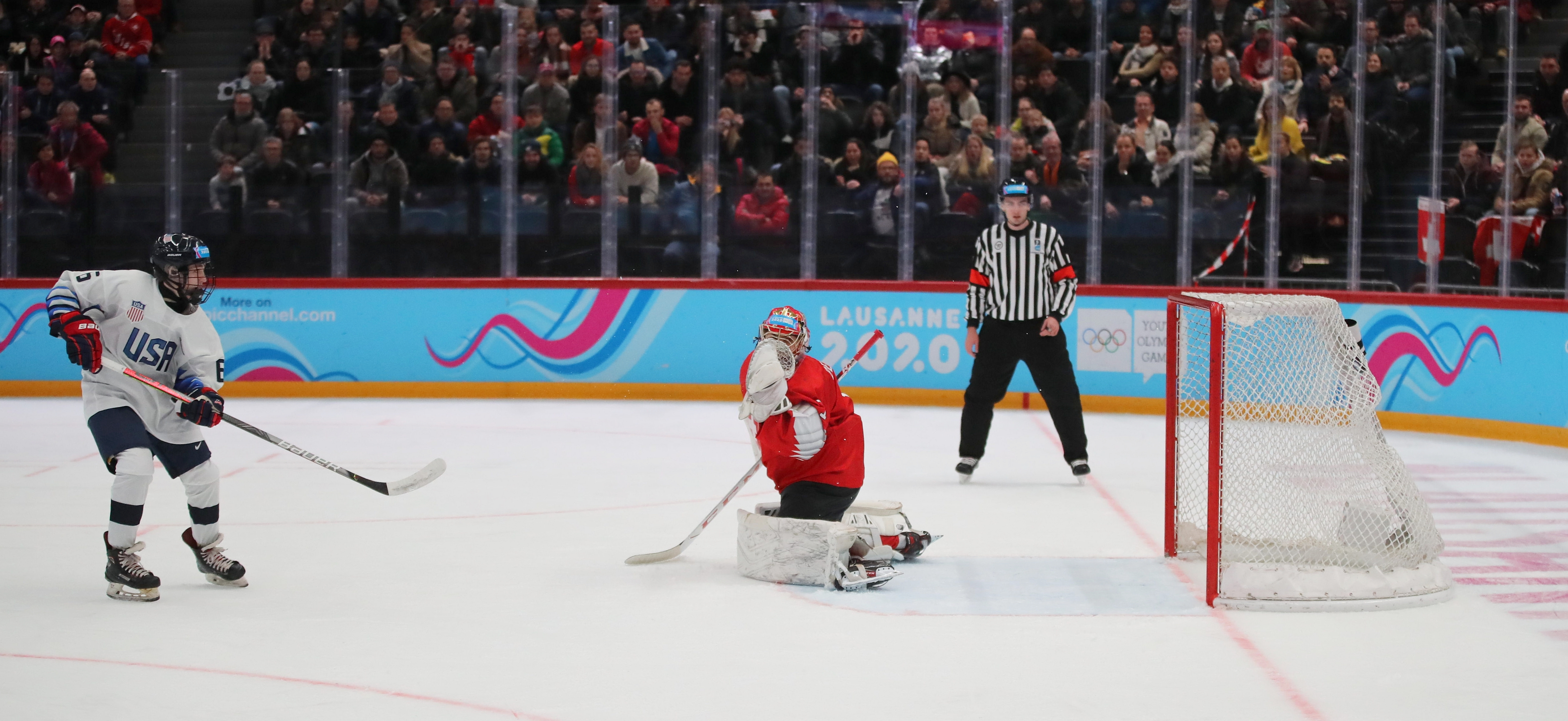
Game-winning penalty shot goal by Lane Hutson, USA, against Switzerland

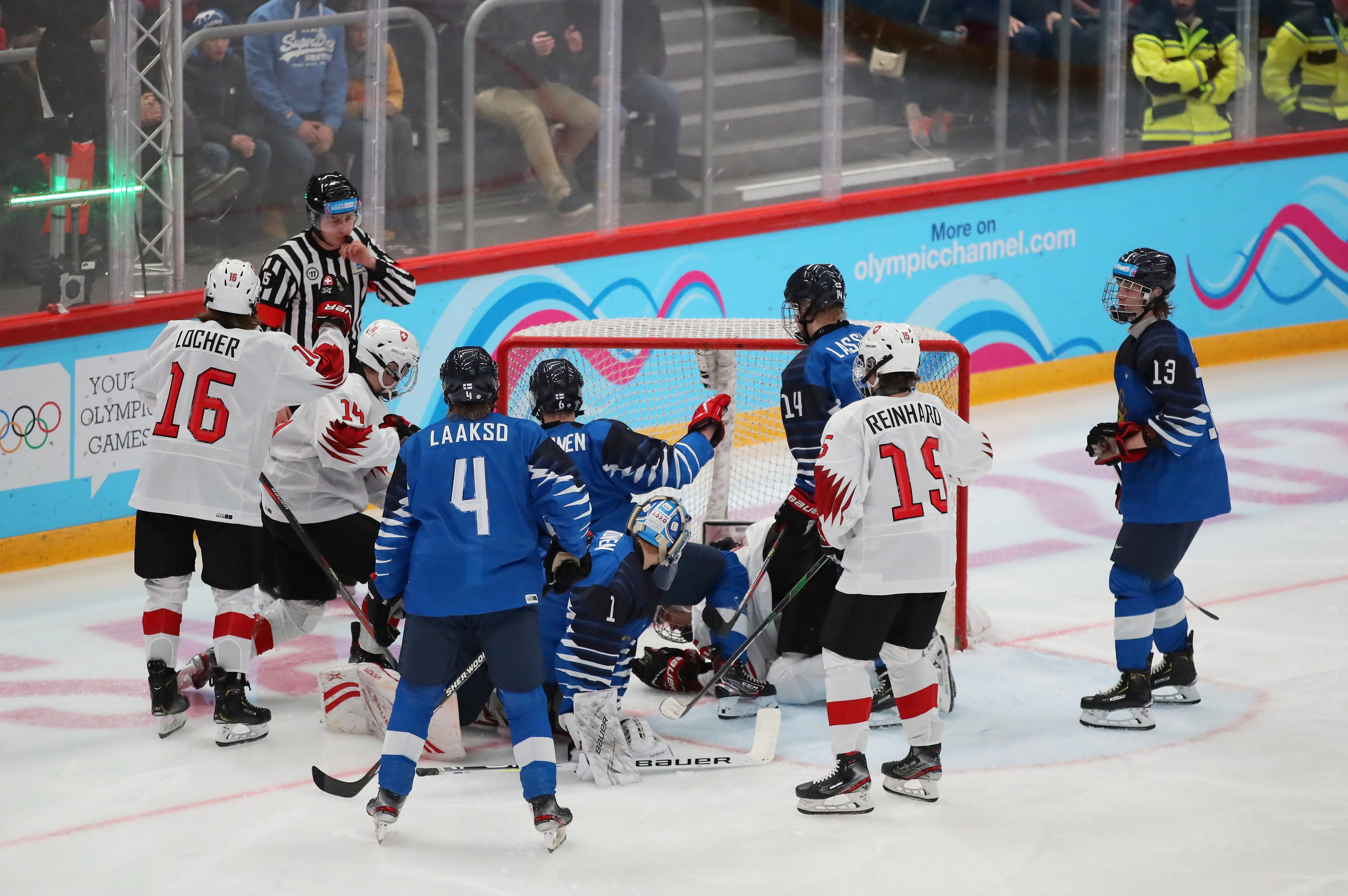
Moved net in the game between Finland and Switzerland

=== Group B ===
Pos	Team	Pld	W	SOW	SOL	L	GF	GA	GD	Pts	Qualification
1	Russia	2	2	0	0	0	15	2	+13	6	Semifinals
2	Canada	2	1	0	0	1	8	6	+2	3	Semifinals
3	Denmark	2	0	0	0	2	0	15	−15	0	

Source: Lausanne2020

18 January 2020; 14:00	Canada	2–6 (0–4, 2–1, 0–1)	Russia	Vaudoise aréna Attendance: 6,500

Game reference

Vincent Filion
Dylan Ernst
Goalies
Sergei Ivanov
Referees:
(United Kingdom) David Good
(Hungary) Zsombor Pálkövi
Linesmen:
(Austria) Sebastian Bedynek
(Slovakia) Juraj Konc

	0–1	06:43 – Michkov (Kvochko, Duda) (PP)
	0–2	08:12 – Gazizov (Miroshnichenko) (SH)
	0–3	11:21 – Michkov (Duda, Miroshnichenko) (PP)
	0–4	12:53 – Malov (Gazizov, Ryzhov)
	0–5	18:28 – Kvochko (Michkov) (PP)
Fantilli (Ludwinski) – 19:35	1–5
Mateychuk (Fimis) – 24:33	2–5
	2–6	43:17 – Malov

19 min
Penalties
4.5 min
17
Shots
22

19 January 2020; 14:00	Denmark	0–6 (0–4, 0–1, 0–1)	Canada	Vaudoise aréna Attendance: 7,200

Game reference

Mathias Petersen
Goalies
Vincent Filion
Referees:
(United Kingdom) David Good
(Russia) Igor Prusov
Linesmen:
(Switzerland) Eric Cattaneo
(United States) Shane Gustafson

0–1	05:00 – Côté (Lindgren)
0–2	09:23 – Fantilli (Savoie, Danielson)
0–3	11:45 – Verreault (Luneau) (PP)
0–4	13:12 – Savoie (Mateychuk) (SH)
0–5	26:32 – Guindon (Verreault, Lindgren)
0–6	35:03 – Verreault (Guindon)

4.5 min
Penalties
6 min
8
Shots
44

20 January 2020; 14:00	Russia	9–0 (3–0, 3–0, 3–0)	Denmark	Vaudoise aréna Attendance: 4,300

Game reference

Sergei Murashov
Goalies
Magnus Mortensen
Referees:
(Sweden) Filip Eriksson
(United Kingdom) David Good
Linesmen:
(Austria) Sebastian Bedynek
(Slovakia) Juraj Konc

Miroshnichenko (Michkov, Kudryavtsev) – 00:25	1–0
Michkov (Miroshnichenko, Malyavin) – 03:18	2–0
Miroshnichenko (Michkov, Safin) – 12:36	3–0
Michkov (Rogovski, Duda) (PP2) – 17:30	4–0
Kvochko (Kudryavtsev) – 20:29	5–0
Michkov (Kvochko, Kudryavtsev) – 23:29	6–0
Michkov (Kvochko) – 35:19	7–0
Miroshnichenko (Kudryavtsev) – 39:30	8–0
Dolzhenkov (Safin, Gulyayev) – 44:01	9–0

1.5 min
Penalties
17.5 min
41
Shots
5

== Playoff round ==
=== Bracket ===
Semifinals
21 January
Russia	10
Finland	1
21 January
United States	2
Canada	1

Final
22 January
Russia	4
United States	0
Third place
22 January
Canada	4
Finland	2

=== Semifinals ===
21 January 2020; 11:00	United States	2–1 (0–0, 2–0, 0–1)	Canada	Vaudoise aréna Attendance: 8,400

Game reference

Dylan Silverstein
Goalies
Vincent Filion
Referees:
(Czech Republic) Jan Jaroš
(Hungary) Zsombor Pálkövi
Linesmen:
(Austria) Sebastian Bedynek
(Switzerland) Eric Cattaneo

Nazar (PS) – 17:59	1–0
Howard (Lucius, Brzustewicz) (PP) – 20:13	2–0
	2–1	33:42 – Danielson (Fantilli, Savoie)

7.5 min
Penalties
6 min
25
Shots
23

21 January 2020; 14:00	Russia	10–1 (3–0, 3–1, 4–0)	Finland	Vaudoise aréna Attendance: 7,700

Game reference

Sergei Ivanov
Sergei Murashov
Goalies
Topias Leinonen
Niklas Kokko
Referees:
(Sweden) Filip Eriksson
(United Kingdom) David Good
Linesmen:
(United States) Shane Gustafson
(Slovakia) Juraj Konc

Rogovski (Kvochko) – 03:48	1–0
Gazizov (Ryzhov, Malov) – 09:06	2–0
Miroshnichenko (SH) – 14:17	3–0
Michkov (Kvochko) (PP) – 15:45	4–0
	4–1	19:04 – Kemell (Lassila, Kulonummi)
Kvochko (Dolzhenkov, Miroshnichenko) – 21:41	5–1
Miroshnichenko (Kvochko) – 26:48	6–1
Miroshnichenko – 30:11	7–1
Gazizov (Michkov, Kvochko) (PP) – 34:42	8–1
Sapunov (Dolzhenkov, Grigoriev) (PP) – 37:59	9–1
Rogovski (Dolzhenkov) (PP) – 39:21	10–1

17.5 min
Penalties
39.5 min
40
Shots
21

=== Bronze medal game ===
22 January 2020; 12:00	(bronze) Canada	4–2 (3–1, 0–0, 1–1)	Finland	Vaudoise aréna Attendance: 3,600

Game reference

Vincent Filion
Goalies
Topias Leinonen
Referees:
(Sweden) Filip Eriksson
(Russia) Igor Prusov
Linesmen:
(United States) Shane Gustafson
(Russia) Ilia Kolyasnikov

Verreault – 01:45	1–0
Danielson (Luneau) – 02:48	2–0
Guindon (Verreault, Ludwinski) – 09:40	3–0
	3–1	14:17 – Laakso (Sulku) (PP2)
	3–2	37:16 – Laakso (Lassila, Kemell) (PP)
Guindon (Ludwinski) (ENG) – 44:28	4–2

22 min
Penalties
20.5 min
28
Shots
20

=== Gold medal game ===
22 January 2020; 15:00	(gold) Russia	4–0 (2–0, 1–0, 1–0)	United States (silver)	Vaudoise aréna Attendance: 8,600

Game reference

Sergei Ivanov
Goalies
Dylan Silverstein
Referees:
(Czech Republic) Jan Jaroš
(Hungary) Zsombor Pálkövi
Linesmen:
(Austria) Sebastian Bedynek
(Switzerland) Eric Cattaneo

Michkov (Kvochko, Miroshnichenko) (PP) – 01:59	1–0
Michkov (Miroshnichenko) – 14:27	2–0
Gazizov (Michkov, Duda) (PP) – 21:46	3–0
Malov (Safin, Grigoriev) – 35:13	4–0

1.5 min
Penalties
9 min
26
Shots
15

== Final ranking ==
Pos	Grp	Team	Pld	W	SOW	SOL	L	GF	GA	GD	Pts
1	B	Russia	4	4	0	0	0	29	3	+26	12
2	A	United States	4	3	0	0	1	17	12	+5	9
3	B	Canada	4	2	0	0	2	13	10	+3	6
4	A	Finland	4	1	0	0	3	10	22	−12	3
5	A	Switzerland (H)	2	0	0	0	2	3	10	−7	0
6	B	Denmark	2	0	0	0	2	0	15	−15	0

Source: Lausanne2020
(H) Host
