= Curling at the 2020 Winter Youth Olympics – Mixed doubles =

Curling – Mixed doubles at the III Winter Youth Olympic Games
- Venue: Palladium de Champéry
- Dates: 18–22 January

Medalists
1st place, gold medalist(s)		Laura Nagy; Nathan Young	Mixed-NOCs
2nd place, silver medalist(s)		Chana Beitone; Nikolai Lysakov	Mixed-NOCs
3rd place, bronze medalist(s)		Pei Junhang; Vít Chabičovský	Mixed-NOCs

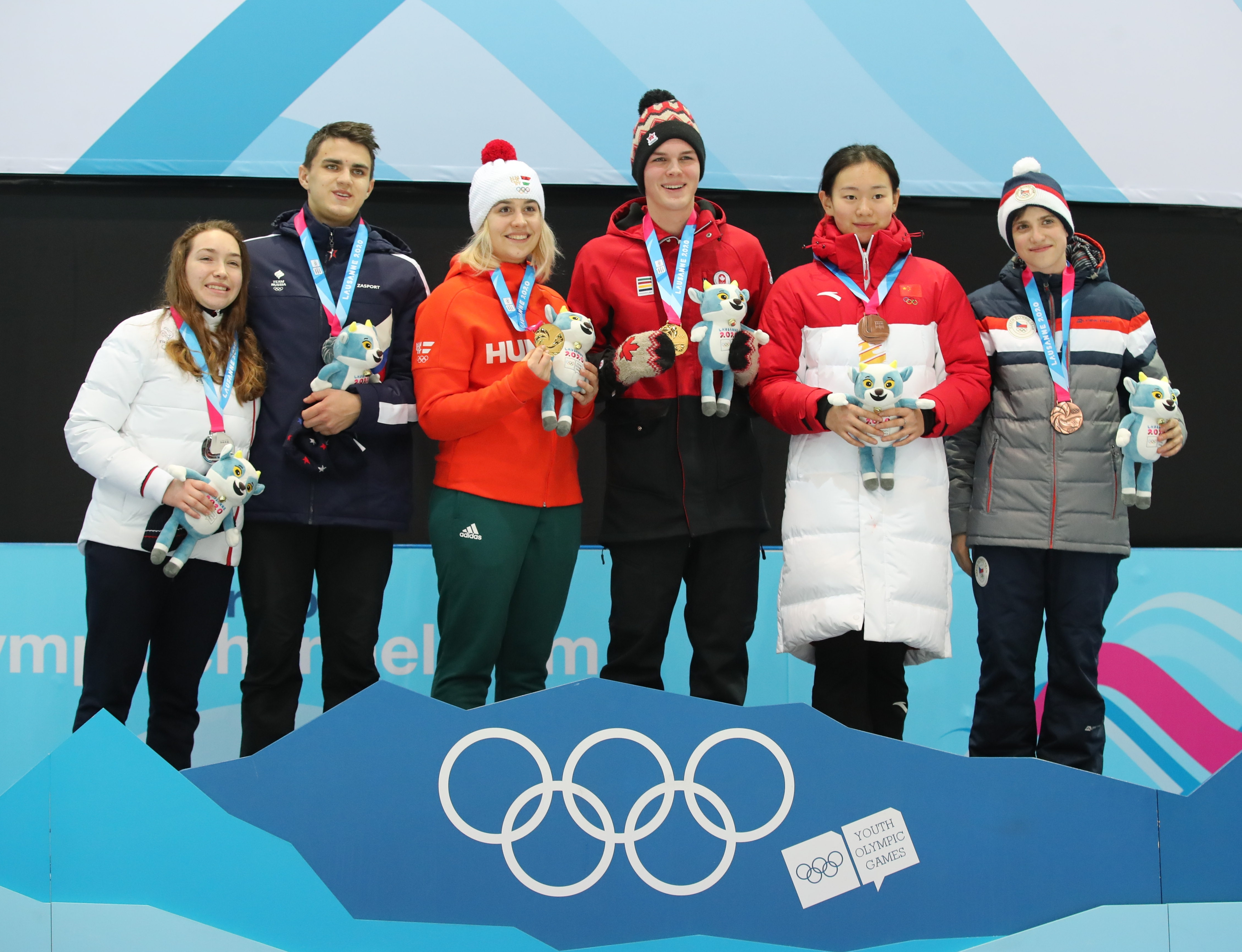
Mixed Doubles Medal Ceremony (from left to right): Chana Beitone, Nikolai Lysakov (silver); Laura Nagy, Nathan Young (gold); Pei Junhang, Vít Chabičovský (bronze)

Mixed doubles curling at the 2020 Winter Youth Olympics was held from 18 to 22 January at the Palladium de Champéry in Champéry, Switzerland.

== Teams ==
The teams will consist of athletes from the mixed team tournament, one boy and one girl from different NOCs. The teams will be selected by the organizing committee based on the final ranking from the mixed team competition in a way that balances out the teams. The players in each pair will then be allowed time to train together.

Teams
Female: Ingeborg Forbregd (NOR) Male: Ričards Vonda (LAT)	Female: Nora Østgård (NOR) Male: Michael Velve (BRA)	Female: Mina Kobayashi (JPN) Male: Léo Tuaz (FRA)	Female: Momoha Tabata (JPN) Male: Romet Mäesalu (EST)
Female: Alina Fakhurtdinova (RUS) Male: Vitor Melo (BRA)	Female: Valeriia Denisenko (RUS) Male: Eduards Seļiverstovs (LAT)	Female: Lucy Neilson (NZL) Male: Henry Grünberg (EST)	Female: Zoe Harman (NZL) Male: Merlin Gros-Soubzmaigne (FRA)
Female: Marta Lo Deserto (ITA) Male: Aleix Raubert (ESP)	Female: Federica Ghedina (ITA) Male: Jakob Omerzel (SLO)	Female: Malin Da Ros (SUI) Male: Ethan Hebert (USA)	Female: Xenia Schwaller (SUI) Male: Lőrinc Tatár (HUN)
Female: Lauren Rajala (CAN) Male: Bine Sever (SLO)	Female: Emily Deschenes (CAN) Male: Oriol Gastó (ESP)	Female: Zoé Antes (GER) Male: Kristóf Szarvas (HUN)	Female: Kim Sutor (GER) Male: Charlie Thompson (USA)
Female: Pei Junhang (CHN) Male: Vít Chabičovský (CZE)	Female: Liu Tong (CHN) Male: Selahattin Eser (TUR)	Female: Nilla Hallström (SWE) Male: Dominik Szmidt (POL)	Female: Lisa Norrlander (SWE) Male: Kilian Thune (DEN)
Female: Hannah Farries (GBR) Male: Kadir Polat (TUR)	Female: Robyn Mitchell (GBR) Male: František Jiral (CZE)	Female: Kim Ji-yoon (KOR) Male: Jonathan Vilandt (DEN)	Female: Park You-been (KOR) Male: Robert Kamiński (POL)
Female: Natalie Wiksten (DEN) Male: Ross Craik (GBR)	Female: Karolina Jensen (DEN) Male: Zhai Zhixin (CHN)	Female: Kristyna Farková (CZE) Male: Axel Landelius (SWE)	Female: Zuzana Pražáková (CZE) Male: Moon Si-woo (KOR)
Female: Monika Wosińska (POL) Male: Zhang Likun (CHN)	Female: Klaudia Szmidt (POL) Male: Jamie Rankin (GBR)	Female: İfayet Şafak Çalıkuşu (TUR) Male: Park Sang-woo (KOR)	Female: Berfin Şengül (TUR) Male: Olle Moberg (SWE)
Female: Laura Nagy (HUN) Male: Nathan Young (CAN)	Female: Linda Joó (HUN) Male: Simone Piffer (ITA)	Female: Ana Vázquez (ESP) Male: Jan Iseli (SUI)	Female: Carmen Pérez (ESP) Male: Johannes Scheuerl (GER)
Female: Alina Tschumakow (USA) Male: Francesco De Zanna (ITA)	Female: Kaitlin Murphy (USA) Male: Jaedon Neuert (CAN)	Female: Sara Rigler (SLO) Male: Benjamin Kapp (GER)	Female: Liza Gregori (SLO) Male: Maximilian Winz (SUI)
Female: Katariina Klammer (EST) Male: Mikhail Vlasenko (RUS)	Female: Natali Vedro (EST) Male: Lukas Høstmælingen (NOR)	Female: Ērika Bitmete (LAT) Male: Takumi Maeda (JPN)	Female: Anna Lasmane (LAT) Male: William Becker (NZL)
Female: Maëlle Vergnaud (FRA) Male: Grunde Buraas (NOR)	Female: Chana Beitone (FRA) Male: Nikolai Lysakov (RUS)	Female: Leticia Cid (BRA) Male: Hunter Walker (NZL)	Female: Gabriela Rogic Farias (BRA) Male: Asei Nakahara (JPN)

== Knockout Draw Bracket ==
The event was held in a modified knockout, with all winners of the Round of 6, including the loser with the best Draw Shot Challenge (DSC), qualifying for the finals.

=== Top half ===
Round of 48
Ingeborg Forbregd (NOR); Ričards Vonda (LAT)	5
Karolina Jensen (DEN); Zhai Zhixin (CHN)	10
Mina Kobayashi (JPN); Léo Tuaz (FRA)	6
Zuzana Pražáková (CZE); Moon Si-woo (KOR)	5
Alina Fakhurtdinova (RUS); Vitor Melo (BRA)	2
Klaudia Szmidt (POL); Jamie Rankin (GBR)	8
Lucy Neilson (NZL); Henry Grünberg (EST)	3
Berfin Şengül (TUR); Olle Moberg (SWE)	7
Ana Vázquez (ESP); Jan Iseli (SUI)	7
Liu Tong (CHN); Selahattin Eser (TUR)	12
Laura Nagy (HUN); Nathan Young (CAN)	11
Lisa Norrlander (SWE); Kilian Thune (DEN)	5
Sara Rigler (SLO); Benjamin Kapp (GER)	5
Robyn Mitchell (GBR); František Jiral (CZE)	8
Alina Tschumakow (USA); Francesco De Zanna (ITA)	7
Park You-been (KOR); Robert Kamiński (POL)	8

Round of 24
Karolina Jensen (DEN); Zhai Zhixin (CHN)	7
Mina Kobayashi (JPN); Léo Tuaz (FRA)	8
Klaudia Szmidt (POL); Jamie Rankin (GBR)	11
Berfin Şengül (TUR); Olle Moberg (SWE)	6
Liu Tong (CHN); Selahattin Eser (TUR)	4
Laura Nagy (HUN); Nathan Young (CAN)	8
Robyn Mitchell (GBR); František Jiral (CZE)	6
Park You-been (KOR); Robert Kamiński (POL)	5

Round of 12
Mina Kobayashi (JPN); Léo Tuaz (FRA)	9
Klaudia Szmidt (POL); Jamie Rankin (GBR)	2
Laura Nagy (HUN); Nathan Young (CAN)	7
Robyn Mitchell (GBR); František Jiral (CZE)	4

Round of 6
Mina Kobayashi (JPN); Léo Tuaz (FRA)	1
Laura Nagy (HUN); Nathan Young (CAN)	8

=== Middle Half ===
Round of 48
Marta Lo Deserto (ITA); Aleix Raubert (ESP)	8
Natali Vedro (EST); Lukas Høstmælingen (NOR)	6
Malin Da Ros (SUI); Ethan Hebert (USA)	4
Anna Lasmane (LAT); William Becker (NZL)	10
Lauren Rajala (CAN); Bine Sever (SLO)	9
Chana Beitone (FRA); Nikolai Lysakov (RUS)	10
Zoé Antes (GER); Kristóf Szarvas (HUN)	9
Gabriela Rogic Farias (BRA); Asei Nakahara (JPN)	2
Kristyna Farková (CZE); Axel Landelius (SWE)	11
Nora Østgård (NOR); Michael Velve (BRA)	6
Natalie Wiksten (DEN); Ross Craik (GBR)	8
Momoha Tabata (JPN); Romet Mäesalu (EST)	6
İfayet Şafak Çalıkuşu (TUR); Park Sang-woo (KOR)	3
Valeriia Denisenko (RUS); Eduards Seļiverstovs (LAT)	10
Monika Wosińska (POL); Zhang Likun (CHN)	8
Zoe Harman (NZL); Merlin Gros-Soubzmaigne (FRA)	2

Round of 24
Marta Lo Deserto (ITA); Aleix Raubert (ESP)	7
Anna Lasmane (LAT); William Becker (NZL)	8
Chana Beitone (FRA); Nikolai Lysakov (RUS)	8
Zoé Antes (GER); Kristóf Szarvas (HUN)	2
Kristyna Farková (CZE); Axel Landelius (SWE)	12
Natalie Wiksten (DEN); Ross Craik (GBR)	6
Valeriia Denisenko (RUS); Eduards Seļiverstovs (LAT)	3
Monika Wosińska (POL); Zhang Likun (CHN)	7

Round of 12
Anna Lasmane (LAT); William Becker (NZL)	5
Chana Beitone (FRA); Nikolai Lysakov (RUS)	10
Kristyna Farková (CZE); Axel Landelius (SWE)	4
Monika Wosińska (POL); Zhang Likun (CHN)	5

Round of 6
Chana Beitone (FRA); Nikolai Lysakov (RUS)	14
Monika Wosińska (POL); Zhang Likun (CHN)	4

=== Bottom half ===
Round of 48
Pei Junhang (CHN); Vít Chabičovský (CZE)	9
Linda Joó (HUN); Simone Piffer (ITA)	6
Nilla Hallström (SWE); Dominik Szmidt (POL)	10
Carmen Pérez (ESP); Johannes Scheuerl (GER)	9
Hannah Farries (GBR); Kadir Polat (TUR)	4
Kaitlin Murphy (USA); Jaedon Neuert (CAN)	8
Kim Ji-yoon (KOR); Jonathan Vilandt (DEN)	3
Liza Gregori (SLO); Maximilian Winz (SUI)	7
Ērika Bitmete (LAT); Takumi Maeda (JPN)	8
Federica Ghedina (ITA); Jakob Omerzel (SLO)	6
Katariina Klammer (EST); Mikhail Vlasenko (RUS)	6
Xenia Schwaller (SUI); Lőrinc Tatár (HUN)	4
Leticia Cid (BRA); Hunter Walker (NZL)	9
Emily Deschenes (CAN); Oriol Gastó (ESP)	10
Maëlle Vergnaud (FRA); Grunde Buraas (NOR)	7
Kim Sutor (GER); Charlie Thompson (USA)	5

Round of 24
Pei Junhang (CHN); Vít Chabičovský (CZE)	12
Nilla Hallström (SWE); Dominik Szmidt (POL)	3
Kaitlin Murphy (USA); Jaedon Neuert (CAN)	6
Liza Gregori (SLO); Maximilian Winz (SUI)	8
Ērika Bitmete (LAT); Takumi Maeda (JPN)	8
Katariina Klammer (EST); Mikhail Vlasenko (RUS)	7
Emily Deschenes (CAN); Oriol Gastó (ESP)	2
Maëlle Vergnaud (FRA); Grunde Buraas (NOR)	8

Round of 12
Pei Junhang (CHN); Vít Chabičovský (CZE)	8
Liza Gregori (SLO); Maximilian Winz (SUI)	2
Ērika Bitmete (LAT); Takumi Maeda (JPN)	8
Maëlle Vergnaud (FRA); Grunde Buraas (NOR)	9

Round of 6
Pei Junhang (CHN); Vít Chabičovský (CZE)	7
Maëlle Vergnaud (FRA); Grunde Buraas (NOR)	3

=== Ranking of Draw Shot Challenge ===
Key
Team to Finals

Team	DSC
Mina Kobayashi (JPN); Léo Tuaz (FRA)	53.30cm
Maëlle Vergnaud (FRA); Grunde Buraas (NOR)	63.33cm
Monika Wosińska (POL); Zhang Likun (CHN)	92.79cm

=== Finals ===
Semifinals
Laura Nagy (HUN); Nathan Young (CAN)	6
Mina Kobayashi (JPN); Léo Tuaz (FRA)	2
Chana Beitone (FRA); Nikolai Lysakov (RUS)	10
Pei Junhang (CHN); Vít Chabičovský (CZE)	5

Gold Medal Game
Laura Nagy (HUN); Nathan Young (CAN)	9
Chana Beitone (FRA); Nikolai Lysakov (RUS)	5
Bronze Medal Game
Mina Kobayashi (JPN); Léo Tuaz (FRA)	3
Pei Junhang (CHN); Vít Chabičovský (CZE)	7

== Knockout results ==
All draw times are listed in Central European Time (UTC+01).

=== Round of 48 ===
==== Draw 1 ====
Saturday, January 18, 10:00

Team	1	2	3	4	5	6	7	8	Final
Ingeborg Forbregd (NOR); Ričards Vonda (LAT)	0	3	0	0	0	1	1	0	5
Karolina Jensen (DEN); Zhai Zhixin (CHN)	3	0	1	1	1	0	0	4	10

Team	1	2	3	4	5	6	7	8	Final
Mina Kobayashi (JPN); Léo Tuaz (FRA)	1	2	0	0	2	0	0	1	6
Zuzana Pražáková (CZE); Moon Si-woo (KOR)	0	0	1	1	0	1	2	0	5

Team	1	2	3	4	5	6	7	8	Final
Alina Fakhurtdinova (RUS); Vitor Melo (BRA)}	0	0	0	2	0	0	X	X	2
Klaudia Szmidt (POL); Jamie Rankin (GBR)	1	1	1	0	4	1	X	X	8

Team	1	2	3	4	5	6	7	8	Final
Lucy Neilson (NZL); Henry Grünberg (EST)	0	0	0	1	1	0	1	X	3
Berfin Şengül (TUR); Olle Moberg (SWE)	2	2	1	0	0	2	0	X	7

==== Draw 2 ====
Saturday, January 18, 14:00

Team	1	2	3	4	5	6	7	8	Final
Marta Lo Deserto (ITA); Aleix Raubert (ESP)	4	0	1	1	0	1	0	1	8
Natali Vedro (EST); Lukas Høstmælingen (NOR)	0	3	0	0	2	0	1	0	6

Team	1	2	3	4	5	6	7	8	Final
Malin Da Ros (SUI); Ethan Hebert (USA)	0	1	1	0	0	0	2	0	4
Anna Lasmane (LAT); William Becker (NZL)	2	0	0	2	2	1	0	3	10

Team	1	2	3	4	5	6	7	8	Final
Lauren Rajala (CAN); Bine Sever (SLO)	1	0	2	1	4	0	0	1	9
Chana Beitone (FRA); Nikolai Lysakov (RUS)	0	4	0	0	0	5	1	0	10

Team	1	2	3	4	5	6	7	8	Final
Zoé Antes (GER); Kristóf Szarvas (HUN)	1	2	1	1	1	0	3	X	9
Gabriela Rogic Farias (BRA); Asei Nakahara (JPN)	0	0	0	0	0	2	0	X	2

==== Draw 3 ====
Saturday, January 18, 18:00

Team	1	2	3	4	5	6	7	8	Final
Pei Junhang (CHN); Vít Chabičovský (CZE)	1	1	0	3	0	4	0	X	9
Linda Joó (HUN); Simone Piffer (ITA)	0	0	1	0	3	0	2	X	6

Team	1	2	3	4	5	6	7	8	Final
Nilla Hallström (SWE); Dominik Szmidt (POL)	0	2	0	2	2	0	3	1	10
Carmen Pérez (ESP); Johannes Scheuerl (GER)	2	0	3	0	0	4	0	0	9

Team	1	2	3	4	5	6	7	8	Final
Hannah Farries (GBR); Kadir Polat (TUR)	1	0	0	0	1	0	2	X	4
Kaitlin Murphy (USA); Jaedon Neuert (CAN)	0	3	2	2	0	1	0	X	8

Team	1	2	3	4	5	6	7	8	Final
Kim Ji-yoon (KOR); Jonathan Vilandt (DEN)	0	0	0	1	2	0	0	X	3
Liza Gregori (SLO); Maximilian Winz (SUI)	2	1	1	0	0	1	2	X	7

==== Draw 4 ====
Saturday, January 19, 10:00

Team	1	2	3	4	5	6	7	8	Final
Ana Vázquez (ESP); Jan Iseli (SUI)	0	3	0	1	0	3	0	X	7
Liu Tong (CHN); Selahattin Eser (TUR)	1	0	4	0	3	0	4	X	12

Team	1	2	3	4	5	6	7	8	Final
Laura Nagy (HUN); Nathan Young (CAN)	2	2	0	2	0	0	5	X	11
Lisa Norrlander (SWE); Kilian Thune (DEN)	0	0	2	0	1	2	0	X	5

Team	1	2	3	4	5	6	7	8	Final
Sara Rigler (SLO); Benjamin Kapp (GER)	0	0	0	0	3	0	2	0	5
Robyn Mitchell (GBR); František Jiral (CZE)	1	2	1	2	0	1	0	1	8

Team	1	2	3	4	5	6	7	8	Final
Alina Tschumakow (USA); Francesco De Zanna (ITA)	1	1	1	0	0	0	4	0	7
Park You-been (KOR); Robert Kamiński (POL)	0	0	0	4	2	1	0	1	8

==== Draw 5 ====
Sunday, January 19, 14:00

Team	1	2	3	4	5	6	7	8	Final
Kristyna Farková (CZE); Axel Landelius (SWE)	4	0	0	0	4	2	1	X	11
Nora Østgård (NOR); Michael Velve (BRA)	0	3	2	1	0	0	0	X	6

Team	1	2	3	4	5	6	7	8	Final
Natalie Wiksten (DEN); Ross Craik (GBR)	1	2	0	0	4	1	0	X	8
Momoha Tabata (JPN); Romet Mäesalu (EST)	0	0	2	1	0	0	3	X	6

Team	1	2	3	4	5	6	7	8	Final
İfayet Şafak Çalıkuşu (TUR); Park Sang-woo (KOR)	1	0	0	1	0	0	1	X	3
Valeriia Denisenko (RUS); Eduards Seļiverstovs (LAT)	0	4	2	0	3	1	0	X	10

Team	1	2	3	4	5	6	7	8	Final
Monika Wosińska (POL); Zhang Likun (CHN)	1	0	2	2	1	2	0	X	8
Zoe Harman (NZL); Merlin Gros-Soubzmaigne (FRA)	0	1	0	0	0	0	1	X	2

==== Draw 6 ====
Sunday, January 19, 18:00

Team	1	2	3	4	5	6	7	8	Final
Ērika Bitmete (LAT); Takumi Maeda (JPN)	0	0	4	0	0	3	0	1	8
Federica Ghedina (ITA); Jakob Omerzel (SLO)	1	1	0	1	1	0	2	0	6

Team	1	2	3	4	5	6	7	8	Final
Katariina Klammer (EST); Mikhail Vlasenko (RUS)	0	0	0	0	1	1	1	3	6
Xenia Schwaller (SUI); Lőrinc Tatár (HUN)	1	1	1	1	0	0	0	0	4

Team	1	2	3	4	5	6	7	8	Final
Leticia Cid (BRA); Hunter Walker (NZL)	0	4	2	3	0	0	0	0	9
Emily Deschenes (CAN); Oriol Gastó (ESP)	1	0	0	0	3	3	1	2	10

Team	1	2	3	4	5	6	7	8	Final
Maëlle Vergnaud (FRA); Grunde Buraas (NOR)	0	0	1	0	4	0	1	1	7
Kim Sutor (GER); Charlie Thompson (USA)	1	1	0	2	0	1	0	0	5

=== Round of 24 ===
==== Draw 1 ====
Monday, January 20, 10:00

Team	1	2	3	4	5	6	7	8	Final
Pei Junhang (CHN); Vít Chabičovský (CZE)	3	2	1	0	5	1	X	X	12
Nilla Hallström (SWE); Dominik Szmidt (POL)	0	0	0	3	0	0	X	X	3

Team	1	2	3	4	5	6	7	8	9	Final
Kaitlin Murphy (USA); Jaedon Neuert (CAN)	0	1	2	1	0	0	2	0	0	6
Liza Gregori (SLO); Maximilian Winz (SUI)	2	0	0	0	1	1	0	2	2	8

Team	1	2	3	4	5	6	7	8	Final
Liu Tong (CHN); Selahattin Eser (TUR)	0	0	0	0	2	2	0	X	4
Laura Nagy (HUN); Nathan Young (CAN)	2	1	0	2	0	0	3	X	8

Team	1	2	3	4	5	6	7	8	Final
Robyn Mitchell (GBR); František Jiral (CZE)	1	0	1	0	1	0	3	0	6
Park You-been (KOR); Robert Kamiński (POL)	0	1	0	1	0	2	0	1	5

==== Draw 2 ====
Monday, January 20, 14:00

Team	1	2	3	4	5	6	7	8	Final
Karolina Jensen (DEN); Zhai Zhixin (CHN)	2	3	0	0	0	1	0	1	7
Mina Kobayashi (JPN); Léo Tuaz (FRA)	0	0	1	1	4	0	2	0	8

Team	1	2	3	4	5	6	7	8	Final
Klaudia Szmidt (POL); Jamie Rankin (GBR)	1	0	5	1	0	1	1	2	11
Berfin Şengül (TUR); Olle Moberg (SWE)	0	4	0	0	2	0	0	0	6

Team	1	2	3	4	5	6	7	8	Final
Kristyna Farková (CZE); Axel Landelius (SWE)	2	0	4	0	0	4	2	X	12
Natalie Wiksten (DEN); Ross Craik (GBR)	0	1	0	3	2	0	0	X	6

Team	1	2	3	4	5	6	7	8	Final
Valeriia Denisenko (RUS); Eduards Seļiverstovs (LAT)	0	1	1	0	1	0	0	X	3
Monika Wosińska (POL); Zhang Likun (CHN)	1	0	0	1	0	2	3	X	7

==== Draw 3 ====
Monday, January 20, 18:00

Team	1	2	3	4	5	6	7	8	Final
Marta Lo Deserto (ITA); Aleix Raubert (ESP)	1	2	1	0	1	0	2	0	7
Anna Lasmane (LAT); William Becker (NZL)	0	0	0	1	0	4	0	3	8

Team	1	2	3	4	5	6	7	8	Final
Chana Beitone (FRA); Nikolai Lysakov (RUS)	1	2	1	0	1	1	2	X	8
Zoé Antes (GER); Kristóf Szarvas (HUN)	0	0	0	2	0	0	0	X	2

Team	1	2	3	4	5	6	7	8	Final
Ērika Bitmete (LAT); Takumi Maeda (JPN)	0	0	2	0	1	3	2	0	8
Katariina Klammer (EST); Mikhail Vlasenko (RUS)	1	2	0	3	0	0	0	1	7

Team	1	2	3	4	5	6	7	8	Final
Emily Deschenes (CAN); Oriol Gastó (ESP)	1	0	0	0	1	0	0	X	2
Maëlle Vergnaud (FRA); Grunde Buraas (NOR)	0	1	4	1	0	1	1	X	8

=== Round of 12 ===
==== Draw 1 ====
Tuesday, January 21, 10:00

Team	1	2	3	4	5	6	7	8	Final
Mina Kobayashi (JPN); Léo Tuaz (FRA)	1	1	0	4	1	2	0	X	9
Klaudia Szmidt (POL); Jamie Rankin (GBR)	0	0	1	0	0	0	1	X	2

Team	1	2	3	4	5	6	7	8	Final
Anna Lasmane (LAT); William Becker (NZL)	0	4	0	1	0	0	0	0	5
Chana Beitone (FRA); Nikolai Lysakov (RUS)	4	0	1	0	1	1	2	1	10

Team	1	2	3	4	5	6	7	8	Final
Pei Junhang (CHN); Vít Chabičovský (CZE)	1	0	2	1	2	0	1	1	8
Liza Gregori (SLO); Maximilian Winz (SUI)	0	1	0	0	0	1	0	0	2

==== Draw 2 ====
Tuesday, January 21, 13:30

Team	1	2	3	4	5	6	7	8	Final
Laura Nagy (HUN); Nathan Young (CAN)	3	0	2	1	1	0	0	X	7
Robyn Mitchell (GBR); František Jiral (CZE)	0	2	0	0	0	1	1	X	4

Team	1	2	3	4	5	6	7	8	Final
Kristyna Farková (CZE); Axel Landelius (SWE)	1	2	0	0	0	0	0	1	4
Monika Wosińska (POL); Zhang Likun (CHN)	0	0	1	1	1	1	1	0	5

Team	1	2	3	4	5	6	7	8	Final
Ērika Bitmete (LAT); Takumi Maeda (JPN)	0	1	0	0	0	5	0	2	8
Maëlle Vergnaud (FRA); Grunde Buraas (NOR)	1	0	2	1	2	0	3	0	9

=== Round of 6 ===
Tuesday, January 21, 18:00

Sheet C	1	2	3	4	5	6	7	8	Final
Mina Kobayashi (JPN); Léo Tuaz (FRA)	1	0	0	0	0	0	0	X	1
Laura Nagy (HUN); Nathan Young (CAN)	0	1	2	1	2	1	1	X	8

Sheet D	1	2	3	4	5	6	7	8	Final
Chana Beitone (FRA); Nikolai Lysakov (RUS)	0	0	3	3	4	1	3	X	14
Monika Wosińska (POL); Zhang Likun (CHN)	1	3	0	0	0	0	0	X	4

Sheet B	1	2	3	4	5	6	7	8	Final
Pei Junhang (CHN); Vít Chabičovský (CZE)	1	1	1	2	0	0	2	X	7
Maëlle Vergnaud (FRA); Grunde Buraas (NOR)	0	0	0	0	2	1	0	X	3

=== Semifinals ===
Wednesday, January 22, 9:30

Sheet A	1	2	3	4	5	6	7	8	Final
Laura Nagy (HUN); Nathan Young (CAN)	0	1	1	0	1	2	1	X	6
Mina Kobayashi (JPN); Léo Tuaz (FRA)	1	0	0	1	0	0	0	X	2

Sheet D	1	2	3	4	5	6	7	8	Final
Pei Junhang (CHN); Vít Chabičovský (CZE)	0	2	0	0	2	0	1	X	5
Chana Beitone (FRA); Nikolai Lysakov (RUS)	2	0	2	3	0	3	0	X	10

=== Bronze Medal Game ===
Wednesday, January 22, 13:30

Sheet C	1	2	3	4	5	6	7	8	Final
Pei Junhang (CHN); Vít Chabičovský (CZE)	1	0	2	1	1	0	1	1	7
Mina Kobayashi (JPN); Léo Tuaz (FRA)	0	1	0	0	0	2	0	0	3

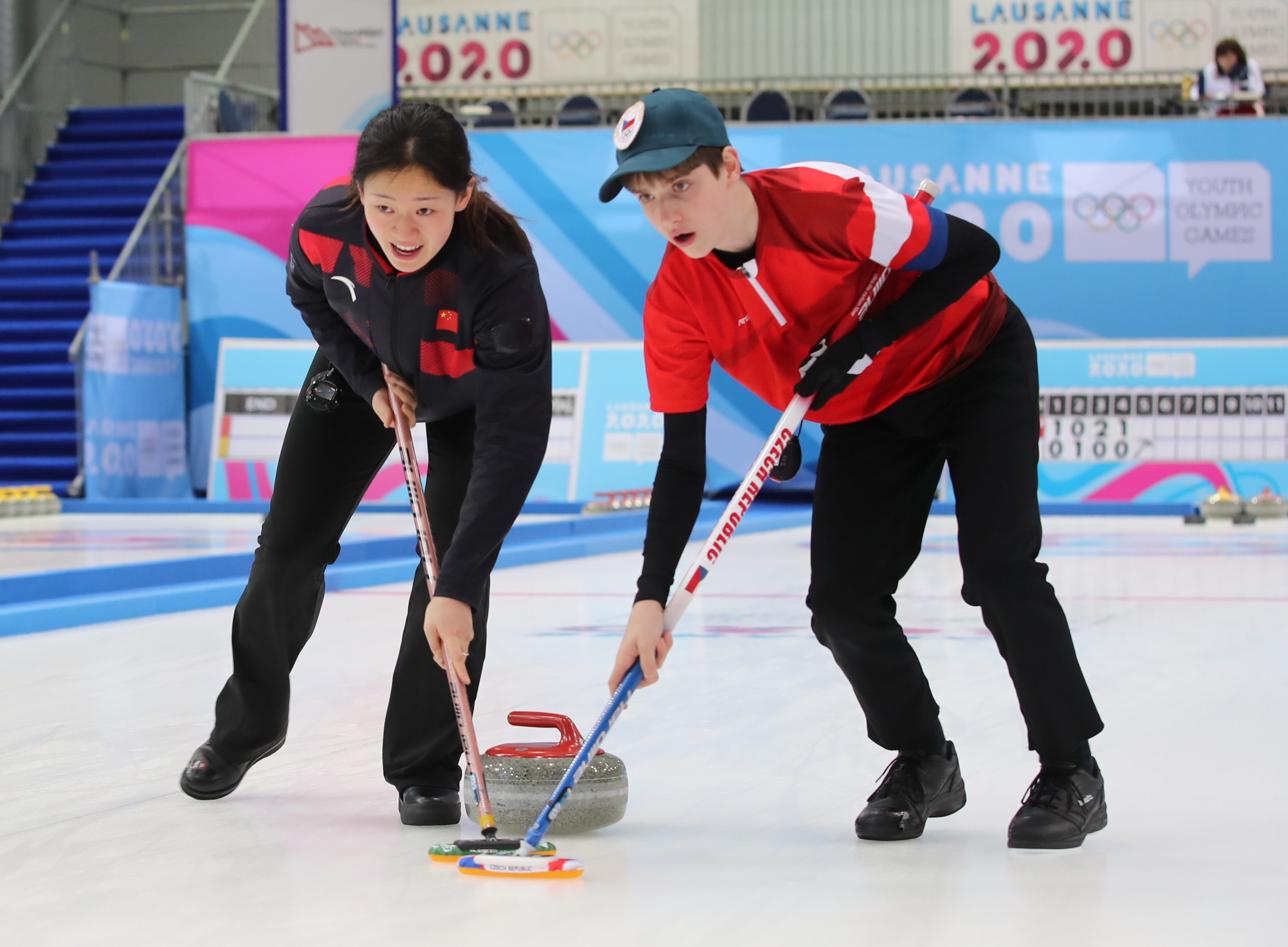
Vít Chabičovský and Pei Junhang during the game

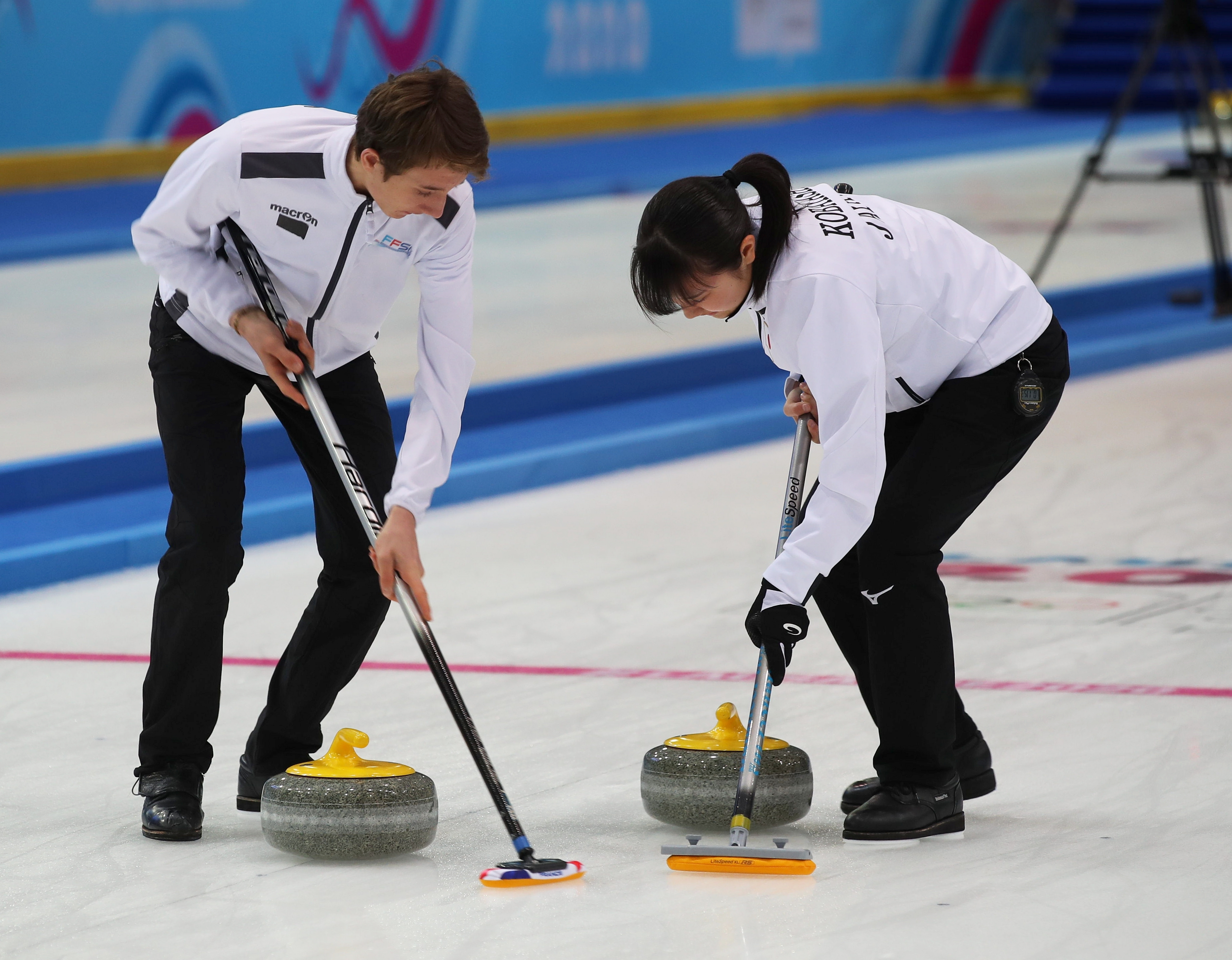
Mina Kobayashi and Léo Tuaz during the game

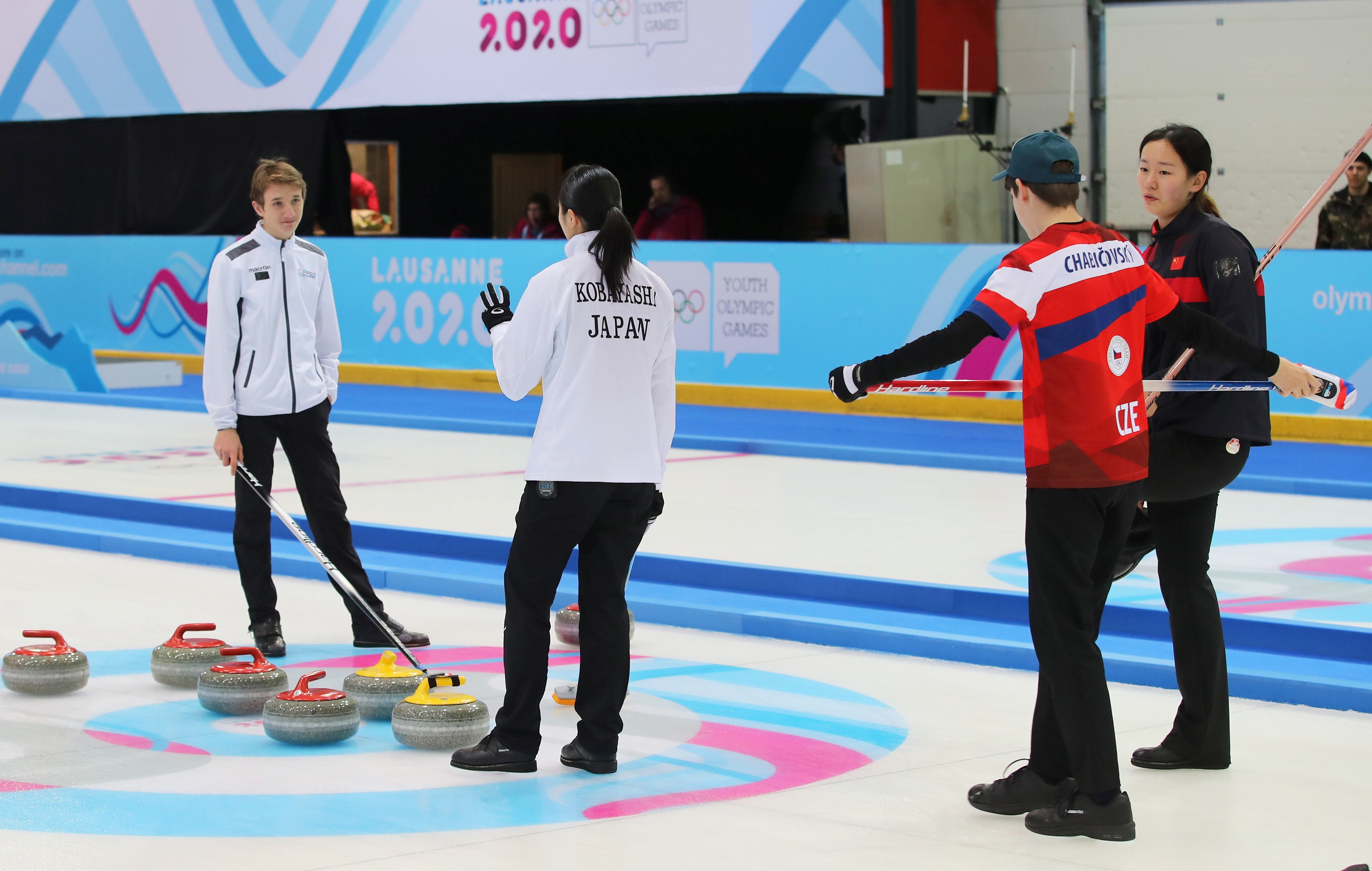
Discussions about the last stone of the game

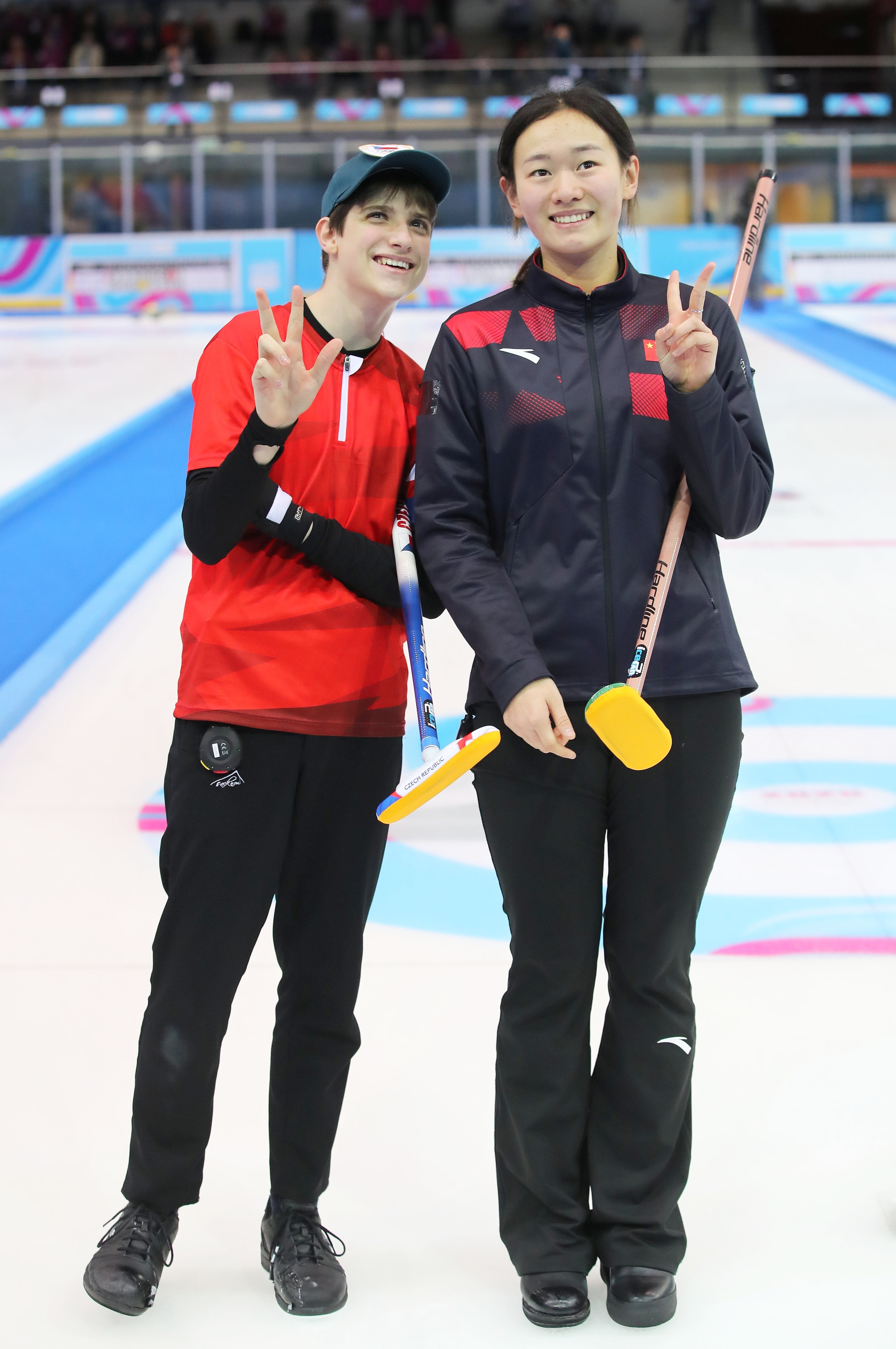
Vít Chabičovský and Pei Junhang celebrate their victory

=== Gold Medal Game ===
Wednesday, January 22, 13:30

Sheet B	1	2	3	4	5	6	7	8	Final
Laura Nagy (HUN); Nathan Young (CAN)	3	2	2	0	0	0	1	1	9
Chana Beitone (FRA); Nikolai Lysakov (RUS)	0	0	0	1	2	2	0	0	5

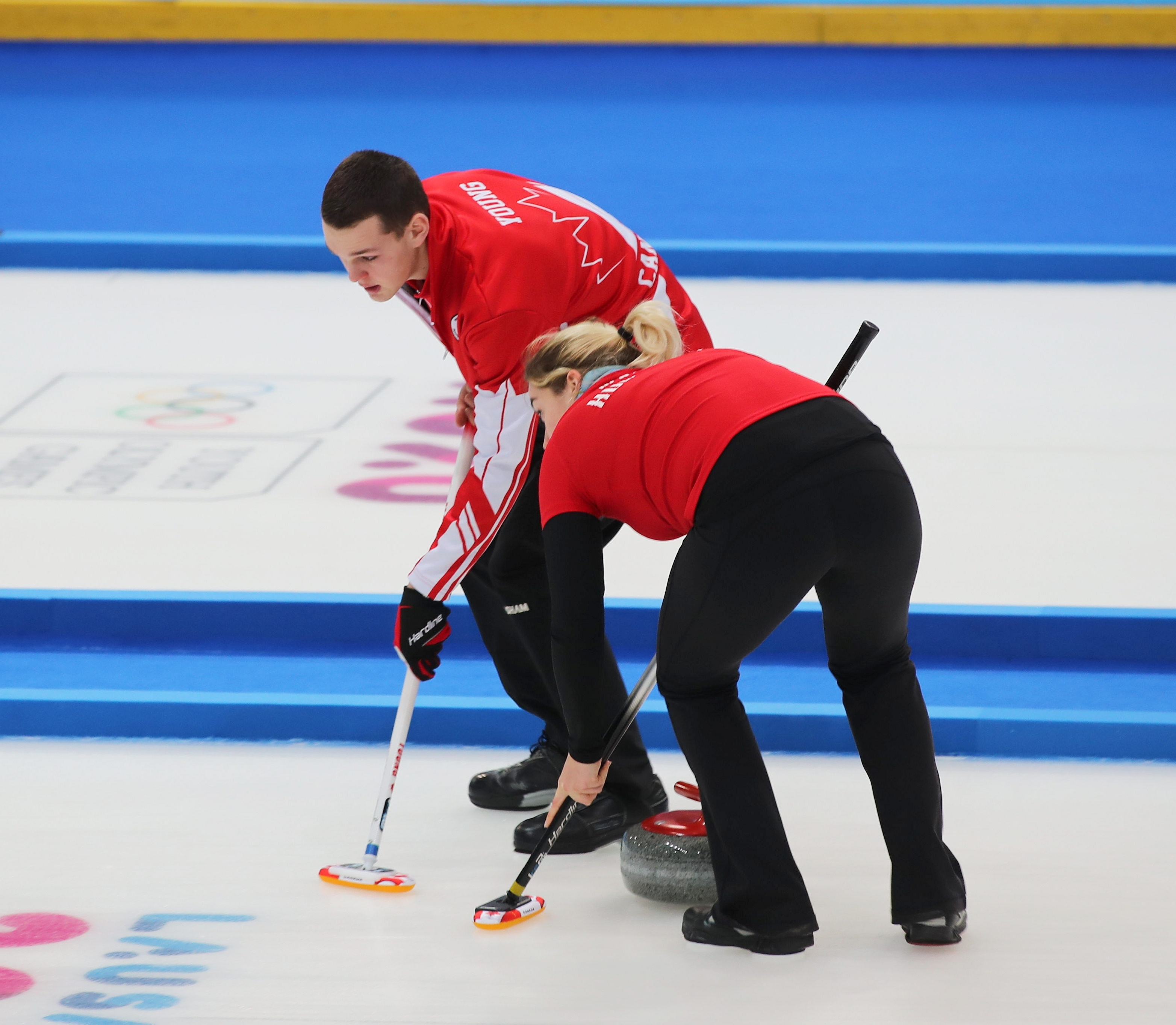
Laura Nagy and Nathan Young during the game

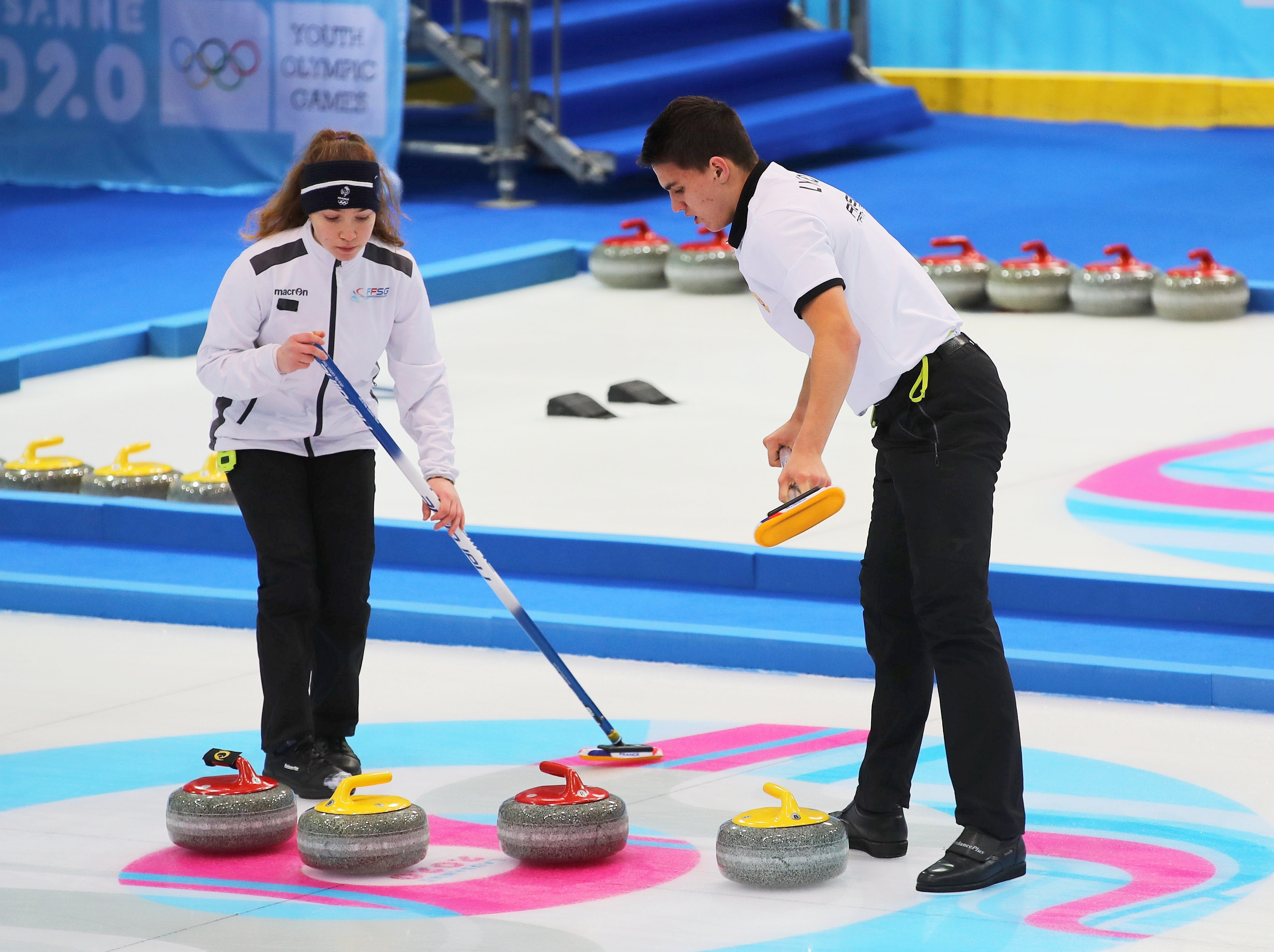
Chana Beitone and Nikolai Lysakov during the game

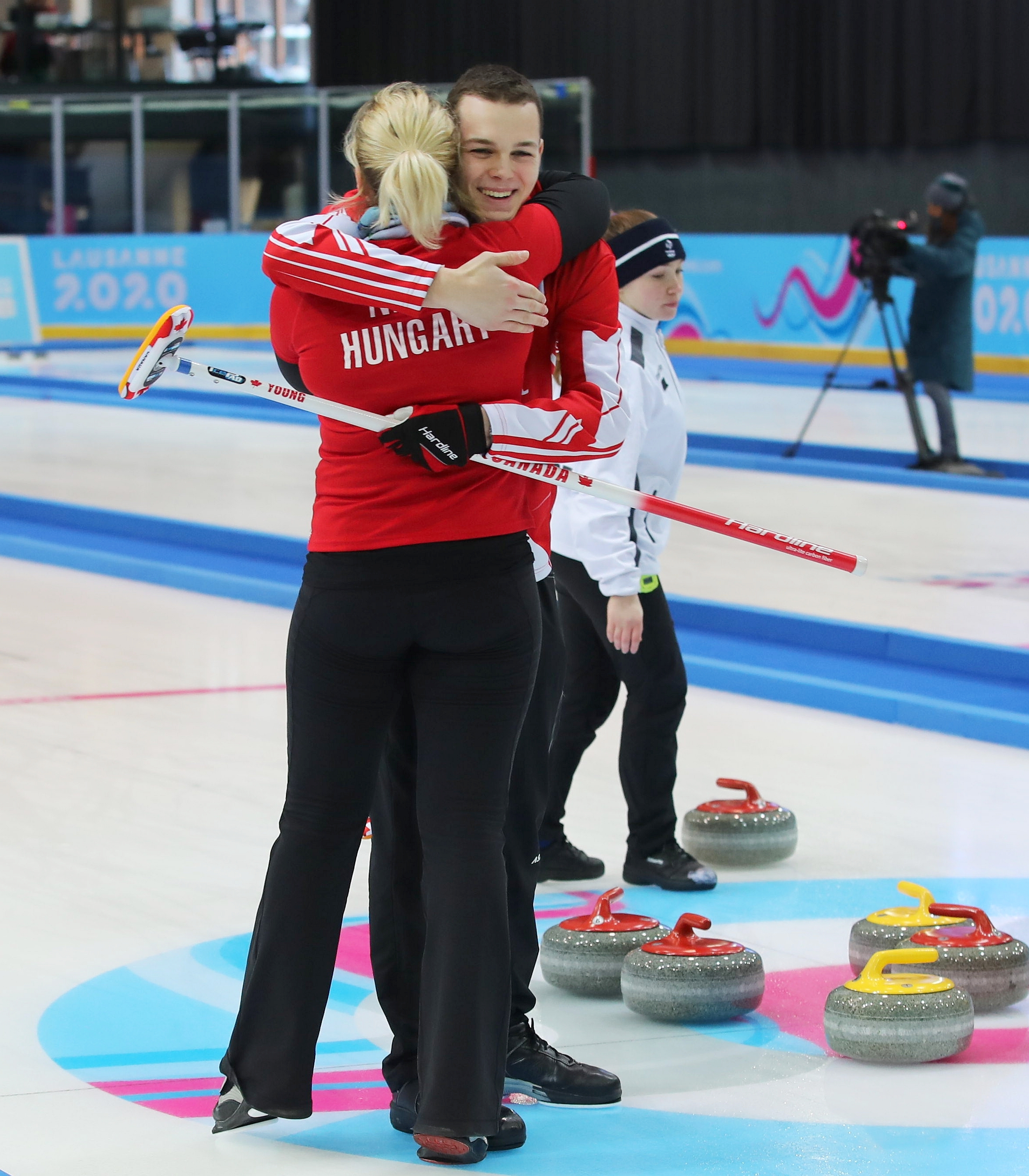
Laura Nagy and Nathan Young celebrate their victory
