= Lane Hutson =

American ice hockey player (born 2004)

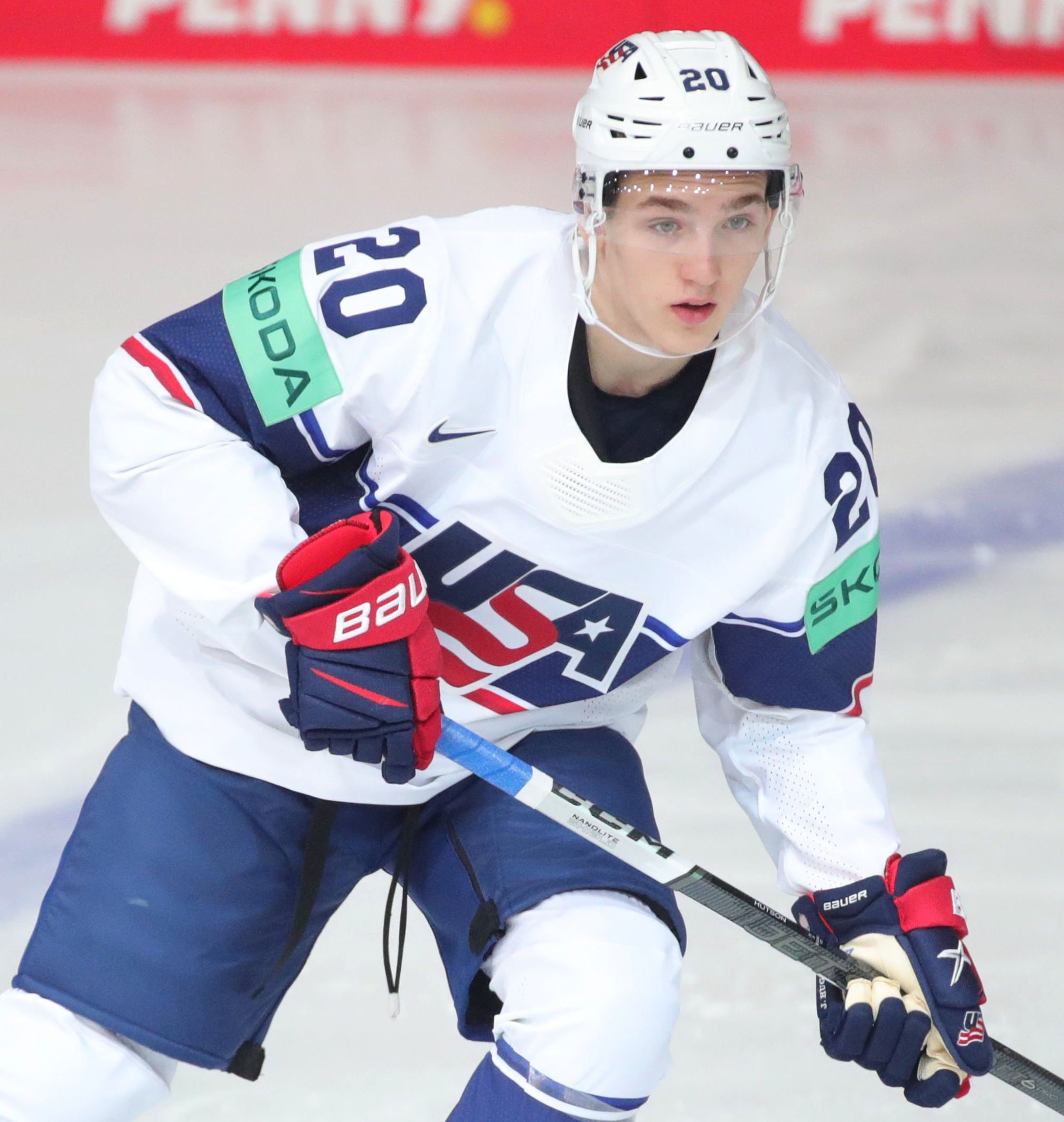
- Hutson with the United States in 2023
- Born: February 14, 2004 (age 22) Holland, Michigan, U.S.
- Height: 5 ft 9 in (175 cm)
- Weight: 162 lb (73 kg; 11 st 8 lb)
- Position: Defense
- Shoots: Left
- NHL team: Montreal Canadiens
- National team: United States
- NHL draft: 62nd overall, 2022; Montreal Canadiens
- Playing career: 2024–present

Lane Hutson (born February 14, 2004) is an American-Canadian professional ice hockey player who is a defenseman for the Montreal Canadiens of the National Hockey League (NHL). He was selected in the second round, 62nd overall, by the Canadiens in the 2022 NHL entry draft. In his debut season with the Canadiens, he won the Calder Memorial Trophy as the best rookie for the 2024–25 campaign.

== Playing career ==
=== Early years ===
Hutson first joined USA Hockey's National Team Development Program (NTDP) for the 2020–21 season, enjoying success at that level. Team strength and conditioning personnel initially worked to address his diminutive frame, and he gained 10 pounds (4.5 kg) between joining the program and into the 2022 offseason. Over the course of his first NHL draft-eligible season, Hutson became a subject of considerable debate among scouts and evaluators with respect to his suitability for the National Hockey League (NHL). Being only 5 ft 8 in (1.73 m) and 150 lb (68 kg) at the time of the 2022 NHL entry draft, both figures uncommon among NHL defensemen at the time, many believed he would be unable to translate to the professional game effectively, despite widespread praise for his skill and hockey intelligence. Sportsnet's draft expert Sam Cosentino remarked "if Hutson was 5-foot-10 today, he would be projected to go inside the top 15 picks of this draft."

Seeking to allay concerns with respect to his size, Hutson arrived at the NHL scouting combine with an endocrinologist report indicating "his bone age is delayed relative to his biological age, which means his frame still has more than a full year of additional bone growth to go." At the subsequent draft held at the Bell Centre in Montreal, Hutson received the E. J. McGuire Award of Excellence, awarded by the NHL Central Scouting Bureau to the player who "best exemplifies commitment to excellence through strength of character, competitiveness, and athleticism." He was selected in the second round, 62nd overall, by the host Montreal Canadiens.

=== Collegiate ===
Hutson committed to play collegiately for Boston University (BU) of the National Collegiate Athletic Association (NCAA) beginning in the 2022–23 season. During his freshman year, he recorded nine goals and a league-high 25 assists in 24 Hockey East games, becoming the first defenseman to ever lead the conference in scoring. Following an outstanding season, he was named a unanimous addition to both the All-Hockey East First Team and All-Hockey East Rookie Team. Hutson was also named Hockey East Rookie of the Year, Hockey East Scoring Champion and runner-up for Hockey East Player of the Year. He became the third defenseman to be named Hockey East Rookie of the Year, and the first since Ian Moran in 1992. He was also presented the Walter Brown Award given to the best American-born Division I men's college ice hockey player in New England, becoming just the second freshman to win said award since its establishment in 1953, and the first since Brian Leetch in 1987.

During the championship game of the 2023 Hockey East tournament, Hutson scored two goals, including the game-winning goal in overtime to help BU win the tournament, and receive an automatic bid to the 2023 Frozen Four. He was subsequently named to the Hockey East All-Tournament Team and Tournament MVP. With a goal during the regional semifinals of the NCAA tournament against Western Michigan, Hutson surpassed Brian Leetch as the highest-scoring freshman in Hockey East history, a record set in 1987.

Returning to BU for his sophomore year, Hutson was named as an assistant captain prior to the beginning of the 2023–24 season. On November 4, 2023, he scored his first collegiate hat trick in a game against the University of North Dakota. Collectively, he would finish play with 49 points (15 goals, 34 assists) across 38 games.

=== Professional ===
==== Debut and Calder Trophy season (2024–25) ====
Following BU's overtime defeat by Denver during the 2024 Frozen Four, Hutson signed a three-year, entry-level contract with the Canadiens on April 12, 2024. He then made his NHL debut in a 5–4 overtime loss to the Detroit Red Wings on April 15, registering an assist.

Securing a full-time roster spot with the Canadiens ahead of the 2024–25 season, Hutson registered 19 points through the team's first 28 games, including a streak of points in seven consecutive games to set the franchise record for rookie defensemen, surpassing the previous mark of six set by both Glen Harmon in 1943 and Chris Chelios in 1984. On December 14, 2024, he scored his first career NHL goal in a game against the Winnipeg Jets, becoming the third rookie defenseman in franchise history to reach 20 points in the first 30 games of a season. He was named the NHL's Rookie of the Month for December 2024, in which he recorded 13 points in 14 games, primarily playing on the top defensive pair for Montreal.

Following a multi-assist (3) effort on January 14, 2025 against the Utah Hockey Club, Hutson became the fourth different defenseman in Canadiens history to record a three-assist game at age 20 or younger. Shortly thereafter, he matched Barry Beck as the only rookie defenseman in league history to have two point streaks of at least seven consecutive games. Upon extending his point streak to eight games, Hutson became the first Canadiens rookie skater to post a run of that length since Stéphan Lebeau over three decades prior. On January 21, he joined fellow countryman Shayne Gostisbehere as just the second rookie blueliner in NHL history to post an assist streak of at least nine consecutive games. A month later, he would become the first rookie defenseman to collect 40 assists in fewer than 60 games since Nicklas Lidström in 1991–92.

Registering his 50th assist of the season on March 27, Hutson emulated a select few defensemen in league history to accomplish the same over the course of their rookie campaign, lastly achieved by Gary Suter in 1985–86. Totaling 14 assists during the course of March, he became the first rookie defenseman since Alexei Zhitnik with this type of offensive output in a single calendar month dating back 32 years and would be recognized as the league’s Rookie of the Month for a second time.

Following three assists in a game against the Florida Panthers on April 1, Hutson became the tenth rookie defenseman in NHL history to reach the 60-point plateau in their inaugural season. Similarly, he would also set a Canadiens franchise record for assists by a rookie defenseman with 57, surpassing the previous record of 55 held by Chris Chelios. With his 65th point on April 14 against the Chicago Blackhawks, he would establish a new franchise record for points by a rookie defenseman, likewise overtaking the previous mark set by Chelios (64). Tallying an assist in the final game of the regular season against the Carolina Hurricanes on April 16, Hutson would tie the single-season NHL record for most assists by a rookie defenseman (Larry Murphy) with 60.

With his team clinching the last berth in the ensuing Stanley Cup playoffs, Hutson would be relied upon to continue his offensive prowess for their first round matchup against the Eastern Conference leading Washington Capitals. Despite the Canadiens ultimately bowing out in five games, he would post five assists over that span, the most such by a franchise rookie defenseman during the course of an inaugural postseason series.

In June 2025, Hutson received the Calder Memorial Trophy, awarded to the player deemed as the best rookie across the NHL. With this, he became the first Canadiens player to earn the distinction since goaltender Ken Dryden in 1972. Hutson was also named to the All-Rookie Team, and received votes for the James Norris Memorial Trophy recognizing the best NHL defenseman as determined by the Professional Hockey Writers' Association, finishing ninth in balloting.

==== Contract extension (2025–present) ====
Entering the final year of his entry-level contract, Hutson became eligible to sign an extension with the Canadiens in the summer of 2025. Following media reports of contentious negotiations, it was announced that he and the team had agreed to an eight-year, $70.8 million deal in the early stages of the 2025–26 campaign on October 13. Less than one year later, in late July 2026, Hutson's contract with the Canadiens would be judged by journalists to be the single "best contract" (for a team, not a player) in the NHL, with an estimated "$100 million or so left on the table" over the eight years, as compared to his elite skill level and importance to the Canadiens.

On December 20, 2025 Hutson registered his 100th NHL point in a game against the Pittsburgh Penguins. Reaching this milestone in his 119th career game, Hutson produced at the fourth-fastest pace for an American defender in league history (behind Mark Howe, Brian Leetch, and Phil Housley), while also becoming the first defenseman in Canadiens history to record 100 points at age 21 or younger. On January 4, 2026, he scored his first career overtime-winning goal against the Dallas Stars, his seventh tally of the season, to establish a new career high. Hutson became the second-fastest defenseman in NHL history to record 100 assists after Sergei Zubov when he assisted on a goal by Ivan Demidov during a January 15 game against the Buffalo Sabres; Hutson achieved the feat in 132 games. Hutson finished the regular season with 12 goals and 66 assists in 82 games. His 78 points were the third-most ever for a Canadiens defender in a single season, behind only 85- and 82-point years by Larry Robinson. He came sixth in Norris Trophy balloting for the year.

On April 21, Hutson scored his first postseason goal during the first period of Game 2 of the Canadiens' first round playoff series against the Tampa Bay Lightning, beating Andrei Vasilevskiy with a shot from the blue line. He scored his first game-winning playoff goal during overtime of Game 3 of the same series, firing a slap-shot from just above the faceoff circle. Hutson remarked afterward that it "honestly might have been my first slap shot all year." The Canadiens ultimately reached the Eastern Conference Final, falling to the Carolina Hurricanes in five games. After what was generally considered a lopsided loss to the Hurricanes, Hutson commented that the team was "still far off and we know it." He finished the postseason with 16 points in 19 games, and led the team in average ice time.

== International play ==
Medal record

Men's ice hockey

Representing the United States

World Junior Championships
Gold medal – first place	2024 Sweden	
Bronze medal – third place	2023 Canada	

World U18 Championships
Silver medal – second place	2022 Germany	

Winter Youth Olympics
Silver medal – second place	2020 Switzerland	

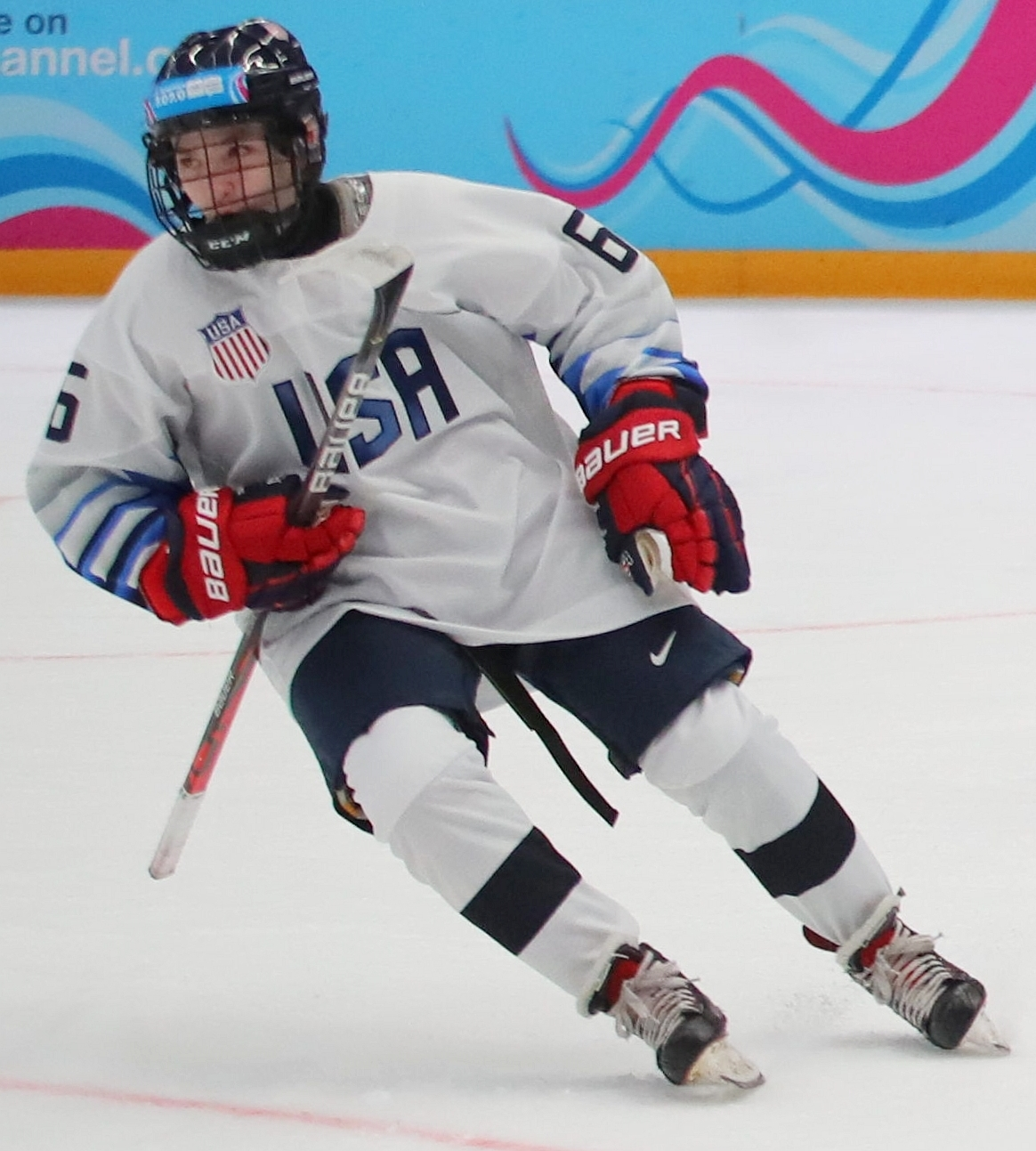
Hutson at the 2020 Winter Youth Olympics

Hutson first represented the United States internationally at the 2020 Winter Youth Olympics, where he recorded one goal and one assist in four games, earning a silver medal.

The following year, Hutson was named to the United States under-18 team for the 2021 World U18 Championships, registering five assists across five games played. He rejoined the team for the 2022 World U18 Championships and captured a silver medal. Collectively, Hutson would be named the directorate award winner as the tournament's top defenseman and also part of the media All-Star team.

On December 12, 2022, Hutson was named to his country's junior team to compete at the 2023 World Junior Championships. He recorded one goal and three assists in seven games and won a bronze medal. Later the same year, he was part of the senior team for the 2023 World Championship, registering two goals and four assists in nine games. Despite reaching the bronze medal game, the team was ultimately defeated by Latvia in overtime.

On December 16, 2023, Hutson was again named to the junior ranks to compete at the 2024 World Junior Championships. Serving as an alternate captain, he played extensive minutes in the team's deep run at the tournament, including a cumulative 52 minutes over consecutive days in the semifinal and championship games; the latter which saw the United States defeat Sweden for the gold medal. Hutson skated on the top defensive pairing with Ryan Chesley and was subsequently named to the media's All-Star team for his performance.

== Personal life ==
Born to parents Rob (originally from Birch River, Manitoba) and Julie in Holland, Michigan, Hutson grew up in the Chicago suburb of North Barrington, Illinois. He has three brothers: Quinn, Cole and Lars; the former two played college ice hockey at Boston University and now play for the AHL's Bakersfield Condors and the NHL's Washington Capitals. Quinn is a forward under contract to the Edmonton Oilers, and Cole is a defenseman for the Washington Capitals.

Hutson holds dual citizenship of Canada and the United States.

== Career statistics ==
=== Regular season and playoffs ===
			Regular season					Playoffs
Season	Team	League	GP	G	A	Pts	PIM	GP	G	A	Pts	PIM
2020–21	U.S. National Development Team	USHL	39	4	15	19	16	—	—	—	—	—
2021–22	U.S. National Development Team	USHL	60	10	53	63	51	—	—	—	—	—
2022–23	Boston University	HE	39	15	33	48	26	—	—	—	—	—
2023–24	Boston University	HE	38	15	34	49	24	—	—	—	—	—
2023–24	Montreal Canadiens	NHL	2	0	2	2	0	—	—	—	—	—
2024–25	Montreal Canadiens	NHL	82	6	60	66	34	5	0	5	5	0
2025–26	Montreal Canadiens	NHL	82	12	66	78	34	19	3	13	16	12
NHL totals			166	18	128	146	68	24	3	18	21	12

=== International ===
Year	Team	Event	Result	GP	G	A	Pts	PIM
2020	United States	WYO	2nd place, silver medalist(s)	4	1	1	2	14
2021	United States	U18	5th	5	0	5	5	0
2022	United States	U18	2nd place, silver medalist(s)	6	0	8	8	4
2023	United States	WJC	3rd place, bronze medalist(s)	7	1	3	4	2
2023	United States	WC	4th	9	2	4	6	2
2024	United States	WJC	1st place, gold medalist(s)	7	0	6	6	14
Junior totals				29	2	23	25	34
Senior totals				9	2	4	6	2

== Awards and honors ==
Award	Year	Ref
College
Hockey East Rookie of the Year	2023	
Hockey East Scoring Champion	2023	
Hockey East Three-Stars Award	2023	
All-Hockey East First Team	2023, 2024	
All-Hockey East Rookie Team	2023	
All-USCHO Second Team	2023	
Walter Brown Award	2023	
Hockey East All-Tournament Team	2023, 2024	
William Flynn Tournament Most Valuable Player	2023	
AHCA East First Team All-American	2023, 2024	
New England Best Defenseman	2023, 2024	
New England D1 All-Stars	2023, 2024	
New England Most Valuable Player	2023	
New England Rookie of the Year	2023	
All-USCHO First Team	2024	
NHL
E. J. McGuire Award of Excellence	2022	
Rookie of the Month	December 2024, March 2025	
Calder Memorial Trophy	2025	
All-Rookie Team	2025	
International
World U18 Championship – best defenseman	2022	
World U18 Championship – media All-Star team	2022	
World Junior Championship – media All-Star team	2024	

== Records ==
Montreal Canadiens:

- Most single-season assists by a rookie defenseman: 60 (2024–25)
- Most single-season points by a rookie defenseman: 66 (2024–25)

National Hockey League:

- Most single-season assists by a rookie defenseman: 60 (2024–25) (Note: Record shared with Larry Murphy (1980–81))

== Notes ==
Awards and achievements
Preceded by Devon Levi	Hockey East Rookie of the Year; 2022–23	Succeeded by Macklin Celebrini
Preceded by Devon Levi	Hockey East Three-Stars Award; 2022–23	Succeeded by Macklin Celebrini
Preceded by Bobby Trivigno	Hockey East Scoring Champion; 2022–23	Succeeded by Macklin Celebrini
Preceded by Bobby Trivigno	Hockey East Tournament MVP; 2023	Succeeded by Will Smith
Preceded by Connor Bedard	Calder Memorial Trophy; 2025	Succeeded by Matthew Schaefer
