= Ryan Chesley =

American ice hockey player (born 2004)

- Chesley with Minnesota in November 2024
- Born: February 27, 2004 (age 22) Mahtomedi, Minnesota, U.S.
- Height: 6 ft 0 in (183 cm)
- Weight: 195 lb (88 kg; 13 st 13 lb)
- Position: Defense
- Shoots: Right
- NHL team (P) Cur. team: Washington Capitals; Hershey Bears (AHL)
- NHL draft: 37th overall, 2022; Washington Capitals
- Playing career: 2025–present

Ryan Chesley (born February 27, 2004) is an American professional ice hockey defenseman for the Hershey Bears in the American Hockey League (AHL) while under contract as a prospect to the Washington Capitals of the National Hockey League (NHL). He was selected in the second round, 37th overall, by the Capitals in the 2022 NHL entry draft.

== Playing career ==
Chesley played two seasons with the USA Hockey National Team Development Program, spending 2021–22 season with the under-18 team, and the 2020–21 season with the under-17 team.

On July 8, 2022, Chesley was drafted in the second round, 37th overall, by the Washington Capitals in the 2022 NHL entry draft.

Chesley began his college ice hockey for the University of Minnesota during the 2022–23 season. During his freshman year he recorded two goals and eight assists in 36 games. During the 2023–24 season, in his sophomore year, he recorded two goals and six assists in 37 games. He led the league with 74 blocked shots. Following the season he was named to the All-Big Ten Second Team. During the 2024–25 season, in his junior year, he recorded eight goals and 12 assists in 40 games. Following the season he was named an All-Big Ten Honorable Mention honoree.

On May 16, 2025, having concluded his collegiate career, Chesley was signed to a three-year, entry-level contract with the Washington Capitals.

== International play ==
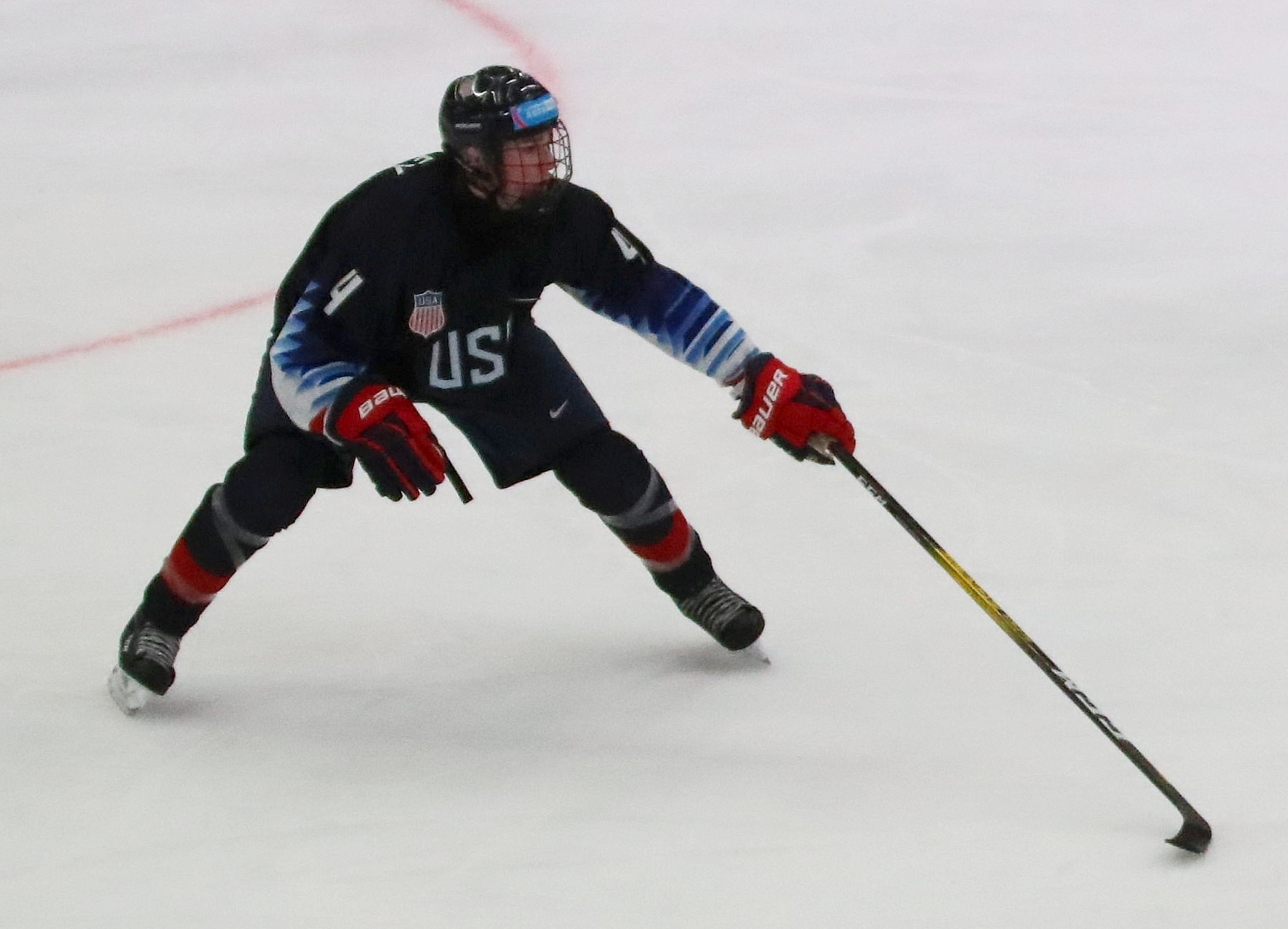
- Chesley at the 2020 Winter Youth Olympics

Medal record

Representing United States

Ice hockey

World Junior Championships
Gold medal – first place	2024 Sweden	
Bronze medal – third place	2023 Canada	

World U18 Championships
Silver medal – second place	2022 Germany	

Winter Youth Olympics
Silver medal – second place	2020 Lausanne	

Chesley first represented the United States internationally at the 2020 Winter Youth Olympics, where he recorded one goal and two assists in four games and won a silver medal.

The following year, he was named to Team USA for the 2021 IIHF World U18 Championships, where he recorded one goal in five games. He again represented Team USA at the 2022 IIHF World U18 Championships, where he recorded two goals and three assists in six games, and won a silver medal. Team USA lost the championship game against Sweden, despite outshooting them 51–15 during the game.

On December 12, 2022, Chesley was named to the national junior team to compete at the 2023 World Junior Ice Hockey Championships. During the tournament he recorded one assist in seven games and won a bronze medal.

On December 16, 2023, Chesley was again named to Team USA's roster to compete at the 2024 World Junior Ice Hockey Championships. Serving as an alternate captain, he recorded one goal and three assists in seven games and won a gold medal. He skated on the top defensive pairing with Lane Hutson.

== Personal life ==
Chesley was born to Steve and Paula Chesley. He has an older sister named Rachel.

== Career statistics ==
=== Regular season and playoffs ===
			Regular season					Playoffs
Season	Team	League	GP	G	A	Pts	PIM	GP	G	A	Pts	PIM
2020–21	U.S. National Development Team	USHL	27	6	8	14	12	—	—	—	—	—
2021–22	U.S. National Development Team	USHL	26	5	10	15	45	—	—	—	—	—
2022–23	University of Minnesota	B1G	36	2	8	10	15	—	—	—	—	—
2023–24	University of Minnesota	B1G	39	2	6	8	19	—	—	—	—	—
2024–25	University of Minnesota	B1G	40	8	12	20	48	—	—	—	—	—
2024–25	Hershey Bears	AHL	4	1	2	3	0	—	—	—	—	—
2025–26	Hershey Bears	AHL	64	6	10	16	18	2	0	1	1	0
AHL totals			68	7	12	19	18	2	0	1	1	0

=== International ===
Year	Team	Event	Result	GP	G	A	Pts	PIM
2021	United States	U18	5th	5	1	0	1	2
2022	United States	U18	2nd place, silver medalist(s)	6	2	3	5	4
2023	United States	WJC	3rd place, bronze medalist(s)	7	0	1	1	0
2024	United States	WJC	1st place, gold medalist(s)	7	1	3	4	0
Junior totals				25	4	7	11	6

== Awards and honors ==
Award	Year
College
All-Big Ten Second Team	2024
