= Nate Danielson =

Canadian ice hockey player (born 2004)

- Born: September 27, 2004 (age 22) Red Deer, Alberta, Canada
- Height: 6 ft 2 in (188 cm)
- Weight: 195 lb (88 kg; 13 st 13 lb)
- Position: Forward
- Shoots: Right
- NHL team: Detroit Red Wings
- NHL draft: 9th overall, 2023; Detroit Red Wings
- Playing career: 2024–present

Nate Danielson (born September 27, 2004) is a Canadian professional ice hockey player who is a forward for the Detroit Red Wings of the National Hockey League (NHL). He was drafted ninth overall by the Red Wings in the 2023 NHL entry draft.

== Playing career ==
Danielson made his WHL debut for the Brandon Wheat Kings during the 2020–21 season and recorded three goals and 12 assists in 24 games. During the 2021–22 season, he averaged over a point-per-game and recorded 23 goals and 34 assists in 53 games. During the 2022–23 season, he served as captain and was the team leaders with 33 goals, 45 assists, 78 points, 13 power play goals 38 power play points and three shorthanded goals. He was named to the WHL East Division's Second All-Star Team and competed at the 2023 CHL/NHL Top Prospects Game. In three seasons for the Wheat Kings of the WHL he recorded 59 goals and 91 assists for 150 points in 145 games. On January 10, 2024, Danielson was traded to the Portland Winterhawks in exchange for Nick Johnson, Rhett Ravndahl, and three draft picks. Prior to being traded, he recorded 12 goals and 14 assists in 26 games for the Wheat Kings.

Danielson was drafted ninth overall by the Detroit Red Wings in the 2023 NHL entry draft. On July 12, 2023, the Red Wings signed Danielson to a three-year, entry-level contract. He made his preseason debut for the Red Wings on September 26, 2023, and scored a goal in a 4–3 victory over the Pittsburgh Penguins.

On May 18, 2024, Danielson was reassigned to the Red Wings' AHL affiliate, the Grand Rapids Griffins. He made his professional debut for the Griffins during the 2024 Calder Cup playoffs. He became the sixth player to make his Griffins debut during the playoffs a year after being drafted, following Jason Spezza (2001), Cory Emmerton (2006), Jan Muršak (2006), Dylan Larkin (2014), and Evgeny Svechnikov (2015).

On November 9th, 2025, Danielson was called up by the Detroit Red Wings and made his NHL debut in a 5–1 loss at home against the Chicago Blackhawks.

== International play ==
Medal record

Ice hockey

Representing Canada

Winter Youth Olympics
Bronze medal – third place	2020 Lausanne	

Danielson represented Canada at the 2020 Winter Youth Olympics where he recorded two goals and one assist in four games and won a bronze medal. He represented Canada at the 2024 World Junior Ice Hockey Championships where he recorded one goals and two assists in 5 games.

== Career statistics ==
=== Regular season and playoffs ===
			Regular season					Playoffs
Season	Team	League	GP	G	A	Pts	PIM	GP	G	A	Pts	PIM
2020–21	Brandon Wheat Kings	WHL	24	3	12	15	8	—	—	—	—	—
2021–22	Brandon Wheat Kings	WHL	53	23	34	57	34	6	1	2	3	2
2022–23	Brandon Wheat Kings	WHL	68	33	45	78	38	—	—	—	—	—
2023–24	Brandon Wheat Kings	WHL	26	12	14	26	14	—	—	—	—	—
2023–24	Portland Winterhawks	WHL	28	12	29	41	28	18	7	17	24	16
2023–24	Grand Rapids Griffins	AHL	—	—	—	—	—	2	0	0	0	0
2024–25	Grand Rapids Griffins	AHL	71	12	27	39	33	3	1	0	1	9
2025–26	Grand Rapids Griffins	AHL	18	3	12	15	4	—	—	—	—	—
2025–26	Detroit Red Wings	NHL	28	2	5	7	4	—	—	—	—	—
NHL totals			28	2	5	7	4	—	—	—	—	—

=== International ===
Year	Team	Event	Result	GP	G	A	Pts	PIM
2024	Canada	WJC	5th	5	1	2	3	0
Junior totals				5	1	2	3	0

== Awards and honours ==
Award	Year(s)
WHL
East Division Second All-Star Team	2023

Awards and achievements
Preceded by Marco Kasper	Detroit Red Wings first-round draft pick 2023	Succeeded by Axel Sandin-Pellikka
