= ISMF Ski Mountaineering World Cup =

Ski mountaineering competitions

- Genre: Ski mountaineering
- Inaugurated: 2004
- Organiser: ISMF

The Ski Mountaineering World Cup is an international circuit of ski mountaineering competitions organized annually by the International Ski Mountaineering Federation (ISMF), starting from the 2004 season.

== Overall result ==
=== Men ===
Year	Winner	2nd	3rd
2005–06	(Italy) Guido Giacomelli	(France) Grégory Gachet	(France) Florent Perrier
2006–07	(Italy) Dennis Brunod	(Italy) Manfred Reichegger	(Italy) Guido Giacomelli
2007–08	(Italy) Dennis Brunod	(Italy) Manfred Reichegger	(France) Florent Perrier
2008–09	(Italy) Manfred Reichegger	(Italy) Denis Trento	(Spain) Kílian Jornet i Burgada
2009–10	(Switzerland) Florent Troillet	(Italy) Manfred Reichegger	(Spain) Kílian Jornet i Burgada
2010–11	(Spain) Kílian Jornet i Burgada	(France) William Bon Mardion	(Italy) Robert Antonioli
2011–12	(Spain) Kílian Jornet i Burgada	(France) William Bon Mardion	(Italy) Manfred Reichegger
2012–13	(France) William Bon Mardion	(France) Mathéo Jacquemoud	(Italy) Manfred Reichegger
2013–14	(Italy) Damiano Lenzi	(Spain) Kílian Jornet i Burgada	(France) William Bon Mardion
2014–15	(Italy) Damiano Lenzi	(Italy) Robert Antonioli	(Italy) Matteo Eydallin
2015–16	(Italy) Michele Boscacci	(Italy) Robert Antonioli	(Germany) Anton Palzer
2016–17	(Italy) Robert Antonioli	(Italy) Michele Boscacci	(Italy) Damiano Lenzi
2017–18	(Italy) Michele Boscacci	(Italy) Robert Antonioli	(Spain) Oriol Cardona Coll
2018–19	(Italy) Robert Antonioli	(Germany) Anton Palzer	(Italy) Michele Boscacci
2019–20	(Italy) Robert Antonioli	(Italy) Davide Magnini	(Switzerland) Werner Marti
2020–21	(Italy) Robert Antonioli	(France) Thibault Anselmet	(Italy) Davide Magnini
2021–22	(Italy) Michele Boscacci	(France) Thibault Anselmet	(Spain) Oriol Cardona Coll
2022–23	(France) Thibault Anselmet	(Belgium) Maximilien Drion	(Switzerland) Rémi Bonnet
2023–24	(France) Thibault Anselmet	(Belgium) Maximilien Drion	(Switzerland) Rémi Bonnet
2024–25	(France) Thibault Anselmet	(Belgium) Maximilien Drion	(Switzerland) Rémi Bonnet
2025–26	(Switzerland) Rémi Bonnet	(Austria) Paul Verbnjak	(France) Thibault Anselmet

==== Statistic by country ====
Rank	Nation	Gold	Silver	Bronze	Total
1	Italy	13	9	8	30
2	France	4	6	4	14
3	Spain	2	1	4	7
4	Switzerland	2	0	4	6
5	Belgium	0	3	0	3
6	Germany	0	1	1	2
7	Austria	0	1	0	1
Totals (7 entries)		21	21	21	63

=== Women ===
Year	Winner	2nd	3rd
2005–06	(Italy) Francesca Martinelli	(Switzerland) Catherine Mabillard	(Switzerland) Gabrielle Magnenat
2006–07	(Italy) Roberta Pedranzini	(Italy) Francesca Martinelli	(France) Corinne Favre
2007–08	(Italy) Roberta Pedranzini	(Italy) Francesca Martinelli	(France) Laetitia Roux
2008–09	(France) Laetitia Roux	(Italy) Roberta Pedranzini	(Italy) Francesca Martinelli
2009–10	(Italy) Roberta Pedranzini	(Italy) Francesca Martinelli	(Spain) Mireia Miró Varela
2010–11	(Switzerland) Nathalie Etzensperger	(France) Laetitia Roux	(Spain) Mireia Miró Varela
2011–12	(France) Laetitia Roux	(Spain) Mireia Miró Varela	(Switzerland) Maude Mathys
2012–13	(France) Laetitia Roux	(Italy) Gloriana Pellissier	(Switzerland) Maude Mathys
2013–14	(France) Laetitia Roux	(Switzerland) Maude Mathys	(Andorra) Sophie Dusautoir Bertrand
2014–15	(France) Laetitia Roux	(France) Axelle Mollaret	(Sweden) Emelie Forsberg
2015–16	(France) Laetitia Roux	(Spain) Claudia Galicia Cotrina	(Switzerland) Jennifer Fiechter
2016–17	(France) Laetitia Roux	(France) Axelle Mollaret	(Spain) Claudia Galicia Cotrina
2017–18	(France) Axelle Mollaret	(France) Laetitia Roux	(Italy) Alba De Silvestro
2018–19	(Spain) Claudia Galicia Cotrina	(Spain) Nahia Quincoces Altuna	(Italy) Alba De Silvestro
2019–20	(Switzerland) Marianne Fatton	(Italy) Alba De Silvestro	(Italy) Ilaria Veronese
2020–21	(France) Axelle Mollaret	(Sweden) Tove Alexandersson	(Spain) Marta Garcia Farres
2021–22	(France) Emily Harrop	(France) Axelle Mollaret	(Italy) Giulia Murada
2022–23	(France) Emily Harrop	(Italy) Giulia Murada	(France) Célia Perillat-Pessey
2023–24	(France) Emily Harrop	(France) Célia Perillat-Pessey	(Italy) Alba De Silvestro
2024–25	(France) Emily Harrop	(France) Célia Perillat-Pessey	(Spain) Ana Alonso Rodriguez
2025–26	(Italy) Giulia Murada	(France) Emily Harrop	(France) Margot Ravinel

==== Statistic by country ====
Rank	Nation	Gold	Silver	Bronze	Total
1	France	13	8	4	25
2	Italy	5	7	6	18
3	Switzerland	2	2	4	8
4	Spain	1	3	5	9
5	Sweden	0	1	1	2
6	Andorra	0	0	1	1
Totals (6 entries)		21	21	21	63

== Discipline result ==
=== Men ===
==== Individual ====
Year	Winner	2nd	3rd
2007	(Italy) Dennis Brunod	(Italy) Manfred Reichegger	(Switzerland) Florent Troillet
2008	(France) Florent Perrier	(Italy) Dennis Brunod	(Spain) Kílian Jornet i Burgada
2009	(Spain) Kílian Jornet i Burgada	(Italy) Manfred Reichegger	(France) Yannick Buffet
2010	(Spain) Kílian Jornet i Burgada	(Switzerland) Florent Troillet	(Italy) Manfred Reichegger
2011	(Spain) Kílian Jornet i Burgada	(France) William Bon Mardion	(Switzerland) Martin Anthamatten
2012	(France) William Bon Mardion	(Spain) Kílian Jornet i Burgada	(Italy) Manfred Reichegger
2013	(France) Mathéo Jacquemoud	(France) William Bon Mardion	(Italy) Matteo Eydallin
2014	(France) William Bon Mardion	(Spain) Kílian Jornet i Burgada	(Italy) Damiano Lenzi
2015	(France) William Bon Mardion	(France) Xavier Gachet	(Spain) Kílian Jornet i Burgada
2016	(Spain) Kilian Jornet i Burgada	(Italy) Michele Boscacci	(Germany) Anton Palzer
2017	(Italy) Matteo Eydallin	(Italy) Robert Antonioli	(Italy) Damiano Lenzi
2018	(Italy) Robert Antonioli	(Italy) Michele Boscacci	(France) Xavier Gachet
2019	(Italy) Robert Antonioli	(Italy) Michele Boscacci	(Italy) Matteo Eydallin
2020	(Italy) Robert Antonioli	(Italy) Davide Magnini	(Italy) Matteo Eydallin
2021	(Italy) Matteo Eydallin	(Italy) Davide Magnini	(Italy) Robert Antonioli
2022	(France) Xavier Gachet	(Italy) Michele Boscacci	(France) William Bon Mardion
2023	(Switzerland) Rémi Bonnet	(France) Thibault Anselmet	(Italy) Matteo Eydallin
2024	(Switzerland) Rémi Bonnet	(France) Xavier Gachet	(Belgium) Maximilien Drion
2025	(Switzerland) Rémi Bonnet	(Austria) Paul Verbnjak	(France) Xavier Gachet
2026	(Switzerland) Rémi Bonnet	(Austria) Paul Verbnjak	(Switzerland) Thomas Bussard

==== Sprint ====
Year	Winner	2nd	3rd
2013	(Germany) Josef Rottmoser	(Switzerland) Marcel Marti	(Italy) Robert Antonioli
2015	(Italy) Robert Antonioli	(Germany) Josef Rottmoser	(Italy) Michele Boscacci
2016	(Italy) Robert Antonioli	(Germany) Anton Palzer	(Switzerland) Iwan Arnold
2017	(Italy) Robert Antonioli	(Italy) Michele Boscacci	(Switzerland) Iwan Arnold
2018	(Italy) Michele Boscacci	(Italy) Nicolò Canclini	(Switzerland) Iwan Arnold
2019	(Switzerland) Iwan Arnold	(Italy) Robert Antonioli	(Austria) Daniel Zugg
2020	(Switzerland) Iwan Arnold	(Italy) Robert Antonioli	(Switzerland) Arno Lietha
2021	(Switzerland) Arno Lietha	(France) Thibault Anselmet	(Italy) Nicolò Canclini
2022	(Switzerland) Arno Lietha	(Spain) Oriol Cardona Coll	(Norway) Hans-Inge Klette
2023	(Switzerland) Arno Lietha	(Switzerland) Iwan Arnold	(France) Thibault Anselmet
2024	(France) Thibault Anselmet	(Spain) Oriol Cardona Coll	(Switzerland) Arno Lietha
2025	(Spain) Oriol Cardona Coll	(Switzerland) Jon Kistler	(France) Thibault Anselmet
2026	(France) Thibault Anselmet	(Spain) Oriol Cardona Coll	(Switzerland) Jon Kistler

==== Vertical ====
Year	Winner	2nd	3rd
2013	(France) William Bon Mardion	(Switzerland) Martin Anthamatten	(Italy) Damiano Lenzi
2014	(Italy) Damiano Lenzi	(France) Mathéo Jacquemoud	(Spain) Kílian Jornet i Burgada
2015	(Spain) Kílian Jornet i Burgada	(Germany) Anton Palzer	(Italy) Damiano Lenzi
2016	(Spain) Kílian Jornet i Burgada	(Switzerland) Rémi Bonnet	(Germany) Anton Palzer
2017	(Italy) Damiano Lenzi	(Switzerland) Werner Marti	(Spain) Kilian Jornet i Burgada
2018	(Germany) Anton Palzer	(Italy) Michele Boscacci	(Switzerland) Werner Marti
2019	(Switzerland) Werner Marti	(Germany) Anton Palzer	(Italy) Robert Antonioli
2020	(Switzerland) Werner Marti	(Switzerland) Rémi Bonnet	(Italy) Robert Antonioli
2021	(France) Thibault Anselmet	(Switzerland) Werner Marti	(Italy) Davide Magnini
2022	(Switzerland) Rémi Bonnet	(Switzerland) Werner Marti	(Italy) Federico Nicolini
2023	(Switzerland) Rémi Bonnet	(Belgium) Maximilien Drion	(France) Thibault Anselmet
2024	(Switzerland) Rémi Bonnet	(Switzerland) Werner Marti	(France) Thibault Anselmet
2025	(Switzerland) Rémi Bonnet	(Belgium) Maximilien Drion	(Switzerland) Aurélien Gay
2026	(Switzerland) Rémi Bonnet	(Switzerland) Aurélien Gay	(Austria) Paul Verbnjak

==== Long distance ====
Year	Winner	2nd
2016	(Italy) Michele Boscacci	(France) William Bon Mardion (France) Xavier Gachet

==== Team ====
Year	Winner	2nd	3rd
2008	(Italy) Dennis Brunod (Italy) Manfred Reichegger	(Italy) Denis Trento (Italy) Martin Riz	(France) William Bon Mardion (France) Gregory Gachet
2015	(Italy) Matteo Eydallin (Italy) Damiano Lenzi	(Italy) Michele Boscacci (Italy) Robert Antonioli	(France) William Bon Mardion (France) Xavier Gachet

==== Statistics by country ====
Total		Individual	Sprint	Vertical	Long distance	Team
18	France	6	2	2	8	0
16	Switzerland	4	5	7	0	0
13	Italy	6	2	2	1	2
7	Spain	4	1	2	0	0
2	Germany	0	1	1	0	0

=== Women ===
==== Individual ====
Year	Winner	2nd	3rd
2007	(Italy) Roberta Pedranzini	(Italy) Gloriana Pellissier	(France) Laetitia Roux
2008	(France) Laetitia Roux	(Italy) Roberta Pedranzini	(Italy) Francesca Martinelli
2009	(France) Laetitia Roux	(Spain) Mireia Miró Varela	(Italy) Roberta Pedranzini
2010	(Italy) Roberta Pedranzini	(Spain) Mireia Miró Varela	(Italy) Francesca Martinelli
2011	(Spain) Mireia Miró Varela	(France) Laetitia Roux	(Switzerland) Nathalie Etzensperger
2012	(France) Laetitia Roux	(Spain) Mireia Miró Varela	(Switzerland) Maude Mathys
2013	(France) Laetitia Roux	(Italy) Gloriana Pellissier	(Switzerland) Maude Mathys
2014	(France) Laetitia Roux	(Switzerland) Maude Mathys	(Andorra) Sophie Dusautoir Bertrand
2015	(France) Laetitia Roux	(France) Axelle Mollaret	(Switzerland) Jennifer Fiechter
2016	(France) Laetitia Roux	(Switzerland) Jennifer Fiechter	(Spain) Claudia Galicia Cotrina
2017	(France) Laetitia Roux	(France) Axelle Mollaret	(Italy) Katia Tomatis
2018	(France) Axelle Mollaret	(France) Laetitia Roux	(Italy) Alba De Silvestro
2019	(France) Axelle Mollaret	(Italy) Alba De Silvestro	(Spain) Claudia Galicia Cotrina
2020	(Italy) Alba De Silvestro	(Switzerland) Marianne Fatton	(France) Axelle Mollaret
2021	(France) Axelle Mollaret	(Sweden) Tove Alexandersson	(Italy) Alba De Silvestro
2022	(France) Axelle Mollaret	(France) Emily Harrop	(Italy) Alba De Silvestro
2023	(France) Axelle Mollaret	(Italy) Giulia Murada	(Italy) Alba De Silvestro
2024	(France) Emily Harrop	(Italy) Alba De Silvestro	(France) Axelle Mollaret
2025	(France) Axelle Mollaret	(France) Emily Harrop	(Italy) Alba De Silvestro
2026	(Italy) Alba De Silvestro	(Italy) Giulia Murada	(France) Axelle Mollaret

==== Sprint ====
Year	Winner	2nd	3rd
2013	(Switzerland) Mireille Richard	(United States) Nina Silitch	(Switzerland) Emilie Gex-Fabry
2015	(France) Laetitia Roux	(Italy) Elena Nicolini	(Sweden) Emelie Forsberg
2016	(France) Laetitia Roux	(Spain) Marta Garcia Farres	(Spain) Claudia Galicia Cotrina
2017	(France) Laetitia Roux	(Spain) Claudia Galicia Cotrina	(Spain) Marta Garcia Farres
2018	(France) Laetitia Roux	(Switzerland) Marianne Fatton	(Spain) Marta Garcia Farres
2019	(Switzerland) Marianne Fatton	(Spain) Claudia Galicia Cotrina	(Spain) Marta Garcia Farres
2020	(Switzerland) Marianne Fatton	(Slovakia) Marianna Jagerčíková	(Switzerland) Déborah Chiarello
2021	(Switzerland) Marianne Fatton	(Spain) Marta Garcia Farres	(Italy) Mara Martini
2022	(France) Emily Harrop	(Slovakia) Marianna Jagerčíková	(France) Lena Bonnel
2023	(France) Emily Harrop	(France) Célia Perillat-Pessey	(Slovakia) Marianna Jagerčíková
2024	(France) Emily Harrop	(France) Célia Perillat-Pessey	(Switzerland) Marianne Fatton
2025	(France) Emily Harrop	(Switzerland) Marianne Fatton	(Spain) Ana Alonso Rodriguez
2026	(France) Margot Ravinel	(Italy) Giulia Murada	(France) Emily Harrop

==== Vertical ====
Year	Winner	2nd	3rd
2013	(France) Laetitia Roux	(Italy) Gloriana Pellissier	(Switzerland) Maude Mathys
2014	(France) Laetitia Roux	(Switzerland) Maude Mathys	(Andorra) Sophie Dusautoir Bertrand
2015	(France) Laetitia Roux	(Switzerland) Victoria Kreuzer	(France) Axelle Mollaret
2016	(Switzerland) Victoria Kreuzer	(France) Laetitia Roux	(Spain) Laura Orguè Vila
2017	(France) Axelle Mollaret	(Sweden) Emelie Forsberg	(Italy) Katia Tomatis
2018	(France) Axelle Mollaret	(Spain) Claudia Galicia Cotrina	(Italy) Katia Tomatis
2019	(Switzerland) Victoria Kreuzer	(Spain) Nahia Quincoces Altuna	(France) Axelle Mollaret
2020	(Switzerland) Victoria Kreuzer	(Italy) Alba De Silvestro	(Switzerland) Marianne Fatton
2021	(France) Axelle Mollaret	(Sweden) Tove Alexandersson	(Switzerland) Victoria Kreuzer
2022	(France) Axelle Mollaret	(France) Emily Harrop	(Austria) Sarah Dreier
2023	(Austria) Sarah Dreier	(France) Axelle Mollaret	(Italy) Giulia Murada
2024	(Austria) Sarah Dreier	(Italy) Alba De Silvestro	(France) Emily Harrop
2025	(France) Emily Harrop	(France) Axelle Mollaret	(Italy) Alba De Silvestro
2026	(France) Axelle Mollaret	(France) Emily Harrop	(Austria) Sarah Dreier

==== Long distance ====
Year	Winners	3rd
2016	(France) Axelle Mollaret (France) Laetitia Roux	(Spain) Mireia Mirò Varela

==== Team ====
Year	Winners	2nd	3rd
2008	(Italy) Roberta Pedranzini (Italy) Francesca Martinelli	(Andorra) Sophie Dusautoir Bertrand (Spain) Izaksun Zubizarreta	(Spain) Cristina Bes i Ginesta (Spain) Emma Boca Rodriguez

==== Statistics by country ====
Total		Individual	Sprint	Vertical	Long distance	Team
34	France	15	9	9	1	0
7	Switzerland	0	4	3	0	0
5	Italy	4	0	0	0	1
2	Austria	0	0	2	0	0
1	Spain	1	0	0	0	0

== See also ==
- World Championships of Ski Mountaineering
