= Squinobal =

Squinobal may refer to:

- Arturo Squinobal (b. 1944), Italian mountain climber, mountain guide and ski mountaineer
- Lorenzo "Renzo" Squinobal (b. 1951), Italian mountain climber, mountain guide and ski mountaineer
- Oreste Squinobal (b. 1943), Italian mountain climber, mountain guide and ski mountaineer
