= Silviu Manea =

Romanian endurance sports athlete (born 1983)

Personal information
- Full name: Silviu-Ionuț Manea
- Born: 5 April 1983 (age 43) Zărnești, Romania

Sport
- Sport: Skiing

Silviu-Ionuț Manea (Romanian pronunciation: [ˈsilvju ˈmane̯a]; born 5 April 1983) is a Romanian endurance sports athlete.

Manea was born in Zărnești, and attended the Liceul Silvic din Braşov. He also competes in mountain biking, mountain running, duathlon and triathlon events.

== Selected results ==
=== Ski mountaineering ===
- 2001
  - 1st, National Championship (ind.)
  - 1st, National Championship (team)
- 2002
  - 1st, National Championship (ind.)
  - 1st, National Championship (team)
  - 1st, Balkan Championship
  - 11th, World Championships of Ski Mountaineering
- 2003
  - 1st, National Championship
  - 1st, Balkan Championship
  - 2nd, European Championship of Ski Mountaineering
  - 2nd, Brigade Skimeisterschaft
- 2004:
  - 1st, National Championship
  - 1st, Brigade Skimeisterschaft
  - 5th, World Championship of Ski Mountaineering
  - 7th, World Championship relay race (together with Ionuț Gălițeanu, Péter Károly and Lucian Clinciu)
- 2005:
  - 1st, National Championship
  - 1st, Brigade Skimeisterschaft
  - 1st, World Cup of Ski Mountaineering
  - 5th, European Championship (individual)
  - 5th, European Championship (vertical race)
  - 7th, World Cup of Ski Mountaineering
  - 8th, European Championship relay race (together with Ionuț Gălițeanu, Rareș Manea and Lucian Clinciu)
- 2006
  - 1st, National Championship
  - 5th, European Cup
  - 7th, World Championship of Ski Mountaineering
- 2007:
  - 1st, National Championship
  - 8th, European Championship relay race (together with Dimitru Frâncu, Rareș Manea and Ionuț Gălițeanu)
  - 21st, European Championship (individual)
  - 21st, World Cup of Ski Mountaineering
  - 26th, European Championship (vertical race)
- 2008:
  - 1st, National Championship - Sinaia Winter Race 2008
  - 1st: Postăvaru Nigh
  - 1st, Balkan Championship
- 2009:
  - 1st: Postăvaru Night
  - 1st, Brigade Skimeisterschaft
  - 1st, Cupa Poiana Zanelor
  - 1st, Concurs Memorial Mike Csaba
  - 26th, World Cup of Ski Mountaineering
- 2010:
  - 1st, Cupa Muntele Mare (high mountain cup)
  - 1st: Postavaru Night
- 2011:
  - 2nd, Postavaru Night
- 2012:
  - 1st, Bucegi Winter Race
  - 1st, Postavaru Night
  - 1st, Cupa memorială Zoli Buzasi
  - 1st, Cupa Vlădeasa
  - 2nd, Zwieselalm Aufstieg (Austria)
  - 11th, Bergfex Sprinter (Austria)
  - 16th, Knauf Stoderzinken Challenge (Austria)
- 2013:
  - 2nd, Mountain Attack Tour
  - 1st, Cupa Honey Energy
  - 1st, Semenic Vertical Race
  - 1st, Bucegi Winter Race
  - 2nd, Postăvaru Night
- 2014:
  - 1st, Postăvaru Night
  - 1st, Parângul Night Challenge
  - 1st, Bucegi Winter Race
  - 1st, Cupa Călimani
  - 3rd, City Speed Up, Bischofshofen (Austria)
  - 5th, Knauf Stoderzinken Challenge (Austria)
  - 5th, Kampstein Schitourenlauf
  - 8th, Mountain Attack Tour (Austria)
  - 10th, Laserzlauf (Austria)

=== Mountain running ===
- 2005:
  - 11th, Red Bull Dolomitenmann (Austria)
  - 12th, Red Bull Cape Tawn Man (Africa de Sud)
- 2006:
  - 2nd, Piatra Craiului Mountains|Piatra Craiului marathon
- 2007:
  - 3rd, Piatra Craiului marathon
- 2008:
  - 2nd, Piatra Craiului marathon
- 2009:
  - 1st, Piatra Craiului marathon
- 2012:
  - 1st, Ultra Trail Făgăraș
- 2013:
  - 1st, Ultra Trail Făgăraș
  - 1st, Cheile Rasnoavei Adventure Semimaraton
  - 2nd, Piatra Craiului marathon
  - 2nd, Azuga Trail Race
  - 2nd, Honey Energy Vertical Race

=== Mountain biking ===
- 2008:
  - 2nd, Geiger Mountain Bike Challenge
  - 1st, Cupa Conpet
- 2009:
  - 1st, Alpin Sport MTB Marathon
  - 2nd, Geiger Mountain Bike Challenge
- 2010:
  - 1st, Argeș County|Argeș Winter Race
  - 2nd, Geiger Mountain Bike Challenge
  - 2nd, Mediaș half marathon
  - 2nd, Surmont MTB Challenge
  - 2nd, 3 Mountains Marathon
- 2012:
  - 1st, Trofeul Chindiei (MTB)
  - 2nd, XCM Brasov (MTB)
  - 2nd, On Top of The World
  - 3rd, Geiger MTB Challenge
  - 2nd, Maros MTB
- 2013:
  - 1st, 3 Mountains Marathon (M>30 ani)
  - 2nd, XCM Brasov MTB (M>30 ani)

=== Duathlon ===
- 2008:
  - 1st, Cetatea Brașovului duathlon
- 2009:
  - 1st, Cetatea Brașovului duathlon
- 2010:
  - 3rd, Cetatea Brașovului duathlon
- 2011:
  - 2nd, Duatlon Țara Bârsei
- 2012:
  - 1st, Cetatea Brașovului duathlon
  - 1st, Duatlon Țara Bârsei
- 2013:
  - 1st, Cetatea Brașovului duathlon
  - 2nd, Duatlon Țara Bârsei

=== Triathlon ===
- 1st, Fără Asfalt triathlon
