= Mezzalama Trophy =

Ski mountaineering competition in Italy

- Date: April
- Location: (Italy) Aosta Valley
- Event type: Ski mountaineering
- Established: 1933
- Website: Trofeo Mezzalama

The Mezzalama Trophy (Italian: Trofeo Mezzalama, French: Trophée Mezzalama, a.k.a. white marathon) is an Italian high altitude ski mountaineering competition in upper Valtournenche and Ayas valleys, in Aosta Valley.

The Mezzalama Trophy, which belongs to the "big three of ski mountaineering" (French: les grandes trois de ski de montagne) besides the two other best-known and classical ski mountaineering events, the Patrouille des Glaciers and the Pierra Menta, is the highest alpine ski mountaineering competition of the world. The event in the Monte Rosa's massif was named in honor of the mountain guide Ottorino Mezzalama.

The Mezzalama Trophy is a stage of La Grande Course that includes the most important ski mountaineering competitions of the season.

== History ==
The Mezzalama Trophy Foundation was founded by friends of Ottorino Mezzalama in 1933 in his memory, one of them was Mario Corti. The race was held every year from 1933 and to 1938. Entry was open only to men; the first female participant is presumed to be Paula Wiesinger, who had been invited to view the race in 1935. When Giusto Gervasutti withdrew due to injury, she put on his military uniform and cap and, wearing sunglasses, ran instead of him, but was discovered at a checkpoint. The 1935 Trofeo Mezzalama was filmed by Mario Craveri in his film "Maratona Bianca".

After 1938 the race was discontinued (except that in 1940 a platonic race was carried out under the name marcia nazionale Ottorino Mezzalama by the Ski Club Torino). Further races were held in 1971, 1973, 1975, and in 1978, and the Mezzalama Trophy was revived as a regular biennial race with the eleventh race in 1997.

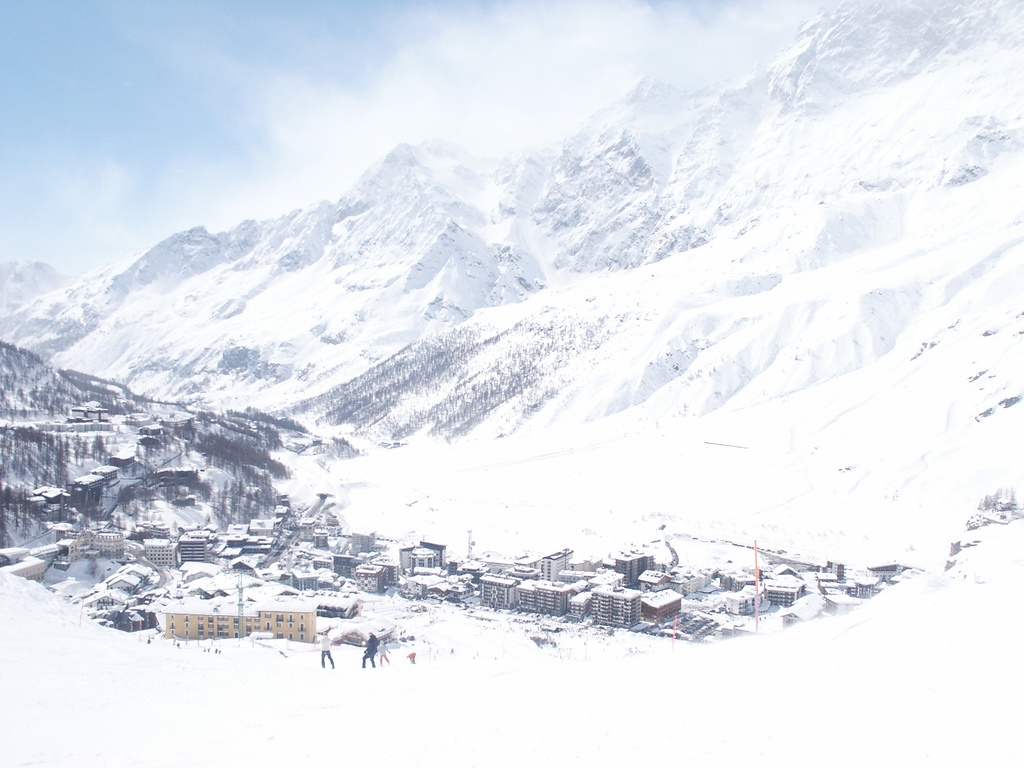
Breuil-Cervinia (starting point)

In 1975, the Mezzalama Trophy was held as World Championship of Skimountaineering. 33 civilian teams, 12 mountain guide teams and 11 military teams participated in this event. In that year, the first female team competed officially. Together with the Pierra Menta and the Tour du Rutor event, the Mezzalama Trophy is part of the Trophée des Alpes (French for Alps' Trophy) series.

== Editions and winners ==
The list shows the winning teams for each edition of the Trofeo Mezzalama.

In 1934, all competing teams were overtaken by the German reserve racer Anderl Heckmair, who started as a single racer one and a half hours after the teams left.

Edition	Date	Ranking	Male teams			Female teams		
1st	May 28, 1933		(Italy) Luigi Carrel	(Italy) Antonio Gaspard	(Italy) Piero Maquignaz			
2nd	May 19, 1934		(Italy) Alberto Chenoz	(Italy) Francesco Chenoz	(Italy) Bartolomeo Carrel			
3rd	May 26, 1935		(Italy) Cap. Enrico Silvestri	(Italy) Serg. Carlo Ronc	(Italy) Alp. Attilio Chenoz			
4th	June 13, 1936		(Italy) Ten. Francesco Vida	(Italy) Serg. Carlo Ronc	(Italy) Serg. Luigi Perenni			
5th	June 19, 1937		(Italy) Ten. Giuseppe Fabre	(Italy) Serg. Luigi Perenni	(Italy) Alp. Anselmo Viviani			
6th	June 11, 1938		(Italy) Aristide Compagnoni	(Italy) Severino Confortola	(Italy) Silvio Confortola			
7th	September 11, 1971		(Italy) Gianfranco Stella	(Italy) Aldo Stella	(Italy) Roberto Stella			
8th	June 1, 1973		(Italy) Gianfranco Stella	(Italy) Aldo Stella	(Italy) Palmiro Serafini			
1st World Championship; 9th edition on May 10, 1975		Category: "civilian teams"						
1st World Championship; 9th edition on May 10, 1975			(Italy) Renzo Meynet	(Italy) Osvaldo Ronc	(Italy) Mirko Stangalino			
1st World Championship; 9th edition on May 10, 1975		Category: "military teams"						
1st World Championship; 9th edition on May 10, 1975			(Italy) Angelo Genuin	(Italy) Bruno Bonaldi	(Italy) Luigi "Gigi" Weiss			
1st World Championship; 9th edition on May 10, 1975		Category: "mountain guide teams"						
1st World Championship; 9th edition on May 10, 1975			(Italy) Oreste Squinobal	(Italy) Arturo Squinobal	(Italy) Lorenzo Squinobal			
10th	April 29, 1978	Category: "civilian teams"						
10th	April 29, 1978		(Austria) Rudolf Kapeller	(Austria) Karl Sinzinger	(Austria) Josef Hones			
10th	April 29, 1978	Category: "military teams"						
10th	April 29, 1978		(Italy) Mario Varesco	(Italy) Fabio Cavagnet	(Italy) Elvio Venturini			
10th	April 29, 1978	Category: "mountain guide teams"						
10th	April 29, 1978		(Italy) Arturo Squinobal	(Italy) Lorenzo Squinobal	(Italy) Danilo Barell			
11th	1997		(Italy) Fabio Meraldi	(Italy) Enrico Pedrini	(Italy) Omar Oprandi	(Italy) Bice Bones	(Italy) Brunella Parolini	(Italy) Fabiana Battel
12th	1999		(Italy) Fulvio Mazzocchi	(Italy) Leonardo Follis	(Italy) Luciano Fontana	(Italy) Gloriana Pellissier	(France) Danielle Hacquard	(France) Véronique Lathuraz
13th	2001		(Italy) Graziano Boscacci	(Italy) Ivan Murada	(Switzerland) Heinz Blatter	(Italy) Gloriana Pellissier	(Italy) Arianna Follis	(Switzerland) Alexia Zuberer
14th	2003		(Switzerland) Damien Farquet	(Switzerland) Rico Elmer	(Switzerland) Rolf Zurbrügg	(Switzerland) Cristina Favre-Moretti	(Italy) Arianna Follis	(Italy) Chiara Raso
15th	2005		(France) Stéphane Brosse	(France) Patrick Blanc	(Italy) Guido Giacomelli	(Italy) Gloriana Pellissier	(Italy) Christiane Nex	(Switzerland) Natascia Leonardi Cortesi
16th	2007		(Italy) Guido Giacomelli	(Italy) Jean Pellissier	(Switzerland) Florent Troillet	(Italy) Gloriana Pellissier	(Italy) Roberta Pedranzini	(Italy) Francesca Martinelli
17th	2009		(Italy) Manfred Reichegger	(Italy) Matteo Eydallin	(Italy) Denis Trento	(Italy) Francesca Martinelli	(Italy) Roberta Pedranzini	(France) Laëtitia Roux
18th	2011		(Spain) Kilian Jornet Burgada	(France) William Bon Mardion	(France) Didier Blanc	(Italy) Francesca Martinelli	(Italy) Roberta Pedranzini	(Italy) Gloriana Pellissier
19th	2013		(Italy) Manfred Reichegger	(Italy) Damiano Lenzi	(Italy) Matteo Eydallin	(Italy) Laura Besseghini	(Italy) Raffaella Rossi	(Italy) Elena Nicolini
20th	2015		(Italy) Matteo Eydallin	(Italy) Michele Boscacci	(Italy) Damiano Lenzi	(Sweden) Emelie Forsberg	(France) Axelle Mollaret	(Switzerland) Jennifer Fiechter
21st	2017		(Italy) Matteo Eydallin	(Italy) Michele Boscacci	(Italy) Damiano Lenzi	(Sweden) Emelie Forsberg	(France) Laetitia Roux	(Switzerland) Jennifer Fiechter

== Literature ==
- Umberto Pelazza, Antonio Vizzi: Il Trofeo Mezzalama 1933-1997 : Storia e leggenda della sci-alpinistica piu alta del mondo (Italian) (Aosta) - ed. La Vallee, 1999
- Rolf Majcen: Bergauf - Abenteuer Ausdauersport (German) ISBN 978-3-900533-39-7
