= Chiara Raso =

Italian ski mountaineer (born 1981)

Personal information
- Born: 26 October 1981 (age 44) Aosta, Italy

Sport
- Sport: Skiing
Medal record
Ski mountaineering
Representing Italy
World Championships
Gold medal – first place	2006 World Championship	Relay

Chiara Raso (born 26 October 1981) is an Italian ski mountaineer.

Raso was born in Aosta. She started ski mountaineering in 2000 and competed first in the Tour de Breuil race in the same year. She has been member of the national team since 2002.

== Selected results ==
- 2002:
  - 2nd, World Championship single race, "espoirs" class
  - 2nd, Transacavallo (together with Maria Luisa Riva)
  - 4th, World Championship team race (together with Gloriana Pellissier, "seniors" ranking)
- 2003:
  - 1st, Trofeo Mezzalama (together with Arianna Follis and Cristina Favre-Moretti)
  - 4th, European Championship team race (together with Maria Luisa Riva)
- 2006:
  - 1st, World Championship relay race (together with Francesca Martinelli, Roberta Pedranzini and Gloriana Pellissier)
  - 6th, World Championship vertical race
  - 8th, World Championship team race (together with Paola Martinale)
