= Giuseppe Fabre =

Giuseppe Fabre (1910 – 3 November 2007) was an Italian Generale di Corpo d'Armata (Lieutenant General) and skier.

== Biography ==
Fabre was born in Cuneo. He served in the South-Tyrolian Alpini battalion "Saluzzo" of the 1 Alpine Division Taurinense before he was transferred to the Scuola Militare di Alpinismo (SCMA; today: Centro Addestramento Alpino) in Aosta. In Aosta he was advanced to the rank of a Lieutenant (Tenente) and became platoon leader of a speed skiing section.

Lieutenant Francesco Vida, Private first class (Caporal maggiore) Ettore Schranz and Private (Caporale) Angelo Bonora were the reserve military patrol team at the 1936 Winter Olympics, where the Italian competition team placed first. One year after, in 1937, Lieutenant Fabre, Sergeant (Sergente) Luigi Perenni and Alpino (Soldier E-1) Anselmo Viviani won the 5th Trofeo Mezzalama competition.

During World War II, in June 1940, he was captain and commander of an Alpini company, that defended the Col de la Seigne on the Western front, a main pass of the Mont Blanc massif. For his merits he was decorated with the Bronze Medal of Military Valor. Meanwhile advanced to Major, he assumed the command of the Alpini battalion in Saluzzo. As commander of the Alpini brigade in Saluzzo, he was captured and spent two years in war captivity in Germany. In 1956 he became commander of the SCMA. Afterwards he became commander of the Military district of Cuneo.

It was Colonel Fabre, who chose the area for Campo Felice, a well known ski station in the Abruzzo region built in the 1960s. For the Ministry of Defence, he supported and organized Olympic events in several functions, for example the 1956 Winter Olympics (Cortina) and the Summer Olympics in 1960 (Rome), 1964 (Tokio) and 1968 (Mexico City). For his work he was decorated with the Stella d'oro al Merito Sportivo (golden star for sportive merits) by the Italian National Olympic Committee.

He was married with two children, Silvio and Gianna. Fabre was buried in the family grave at the cemetery of Saluzzo.

== Decorations ==
- Bronze Medal of Military Valor
- Stella d'oro al Merito Sportivo
- Commander of the Order of Merit of the Italian Republic
