= Genuin =

Genuin may refer to:

- Angelo Genuin (b. 1939), Italian ski mountaineer and cross-country skier
- Magda Genuin (b. 1979), Italian cross country skier
- GENUIN classics, the name of a Leipzig-based classical music label
