= Robert Antonioli =

Italian ski mountaineer (born 1990)

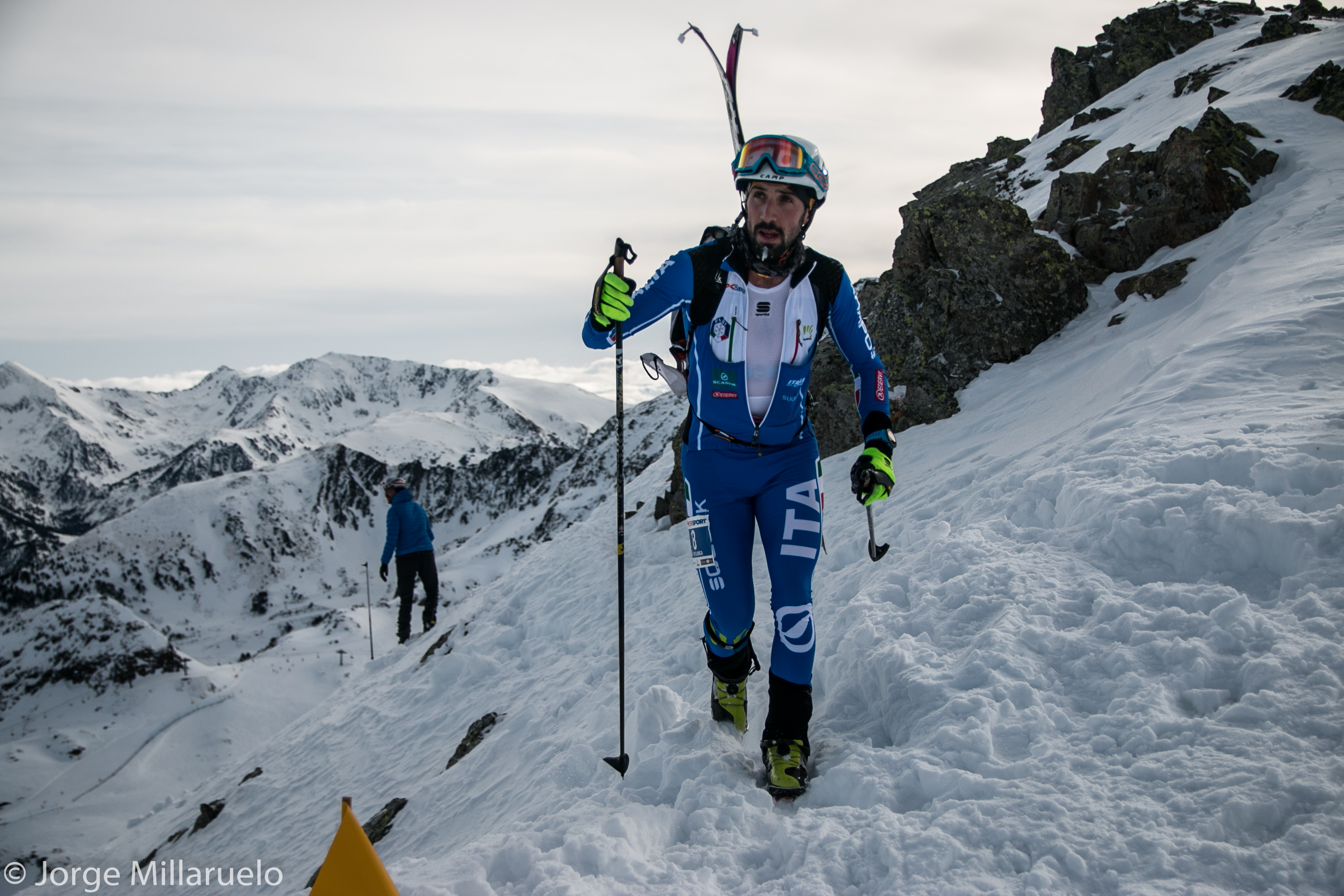

Personal information
- Born: 23 December 1990 (age 35) Sondalo, Italy

Sport
- Sport: Skiing
- Club: Sci Club Alta Valtellina
Medal record
Ski mountaineering
Representing Italy
World Championships
Gold medal – first place	2011 Claut	Relay
Silver medal – second place	2011 Claut	Sprint
Silver medal – second place	2013 Pelvoux	Relay
Gold medal – first place	2015 Verbier	Relay
Silver medal – second place	2015 Verbier	Sprint
Silver medal – second place	2015 Verbier	Individual
Silver medal – second place	2017 Alpago	Relay
Silver medal – second place	2017 Alpago	Team
Gold medal – first place	2019 Villars-sur-Ollon	Individual
Gold medal – first place	2019 Villars-sur-Ollon	Relay
Silver medal – second place	2019 Villars-sur-Ollon	Vertical
Silver medal – second place	2019 Villars-sur-Ollon	Team
Bronze medal – third place	2019 Villars-sur-Ollon	Sprint
Gold medal – first place	2021 Ordino-Arcalis	Relay
Silver medal – second place	2021 Ordino-Arcalis	Individual
Gold medal – first place	2023 Boí Taüll	Team
Bronze medal – third place	2023 Boí Taüll	Individual
European Championships
Silver medal – second place	2012 Pelvoux	Sprint
Bronze medal – third place	2012 Pelvoux	Relay
Gold medal – first place	2014 Arinsal	Vertical
Gold medal – first place	2016 Salvan/Les Marécottes	Sprint
Gold medal – first place	2018 Nicolosi	Individual
Military World Games
Silver medal – second place	2013 Annecy	Relay
Bronze medal – third place	2013 Annecy	Individual

Robert Antonioli (born 23 December 1990) is an Italian ski mountaineer.

== Career ==
Antonioli was born in Sondalo, started ski mountaineering in 2004, and took part in his first competition race in 2006. He is a member of the Sci Club Alta Valtellina, and lives in Valfurva.

== Selected results ==
- 2010:
  - 1st (juniors), Trophée des Gastlosen (ISMF World Cup), together with Michele Boscacci
- 2011:
  - 1st, World Championship relay, together with Manfred Reichegger, Denis Trento and Matteo Eydallin
  - 2nd, World Championship sprint
  - 3rd, World Championship vertical, total ranking
  - 9th, World Championship individual
  - 3rd, Trofeo Mezzalama, together with Marc Pinsach Rubirola and Michele Boscacci
  - 9th, Pierra Menta, together with Michele Boscacci
- 2012:
  - 2nd, European Championship sprint
  - 3rd, European Championship relay, together with Matteo Eydallin, Damiano Lenzi and Manfred Reichegger
  - 7th, European Championship single
  - 8th, World Championship vertical, combined ranking
