= Ronc =

Ronc may refer to:

- Ronco Canavese
- Roncq

== People ==
- Carlo Ronc, Italian ski mountaineer
- Osvaldo Ronc (b. 1947), Italian ski mountaineer
