= Iwan Arnold =

Swiss ski mountaineer (born 1991)

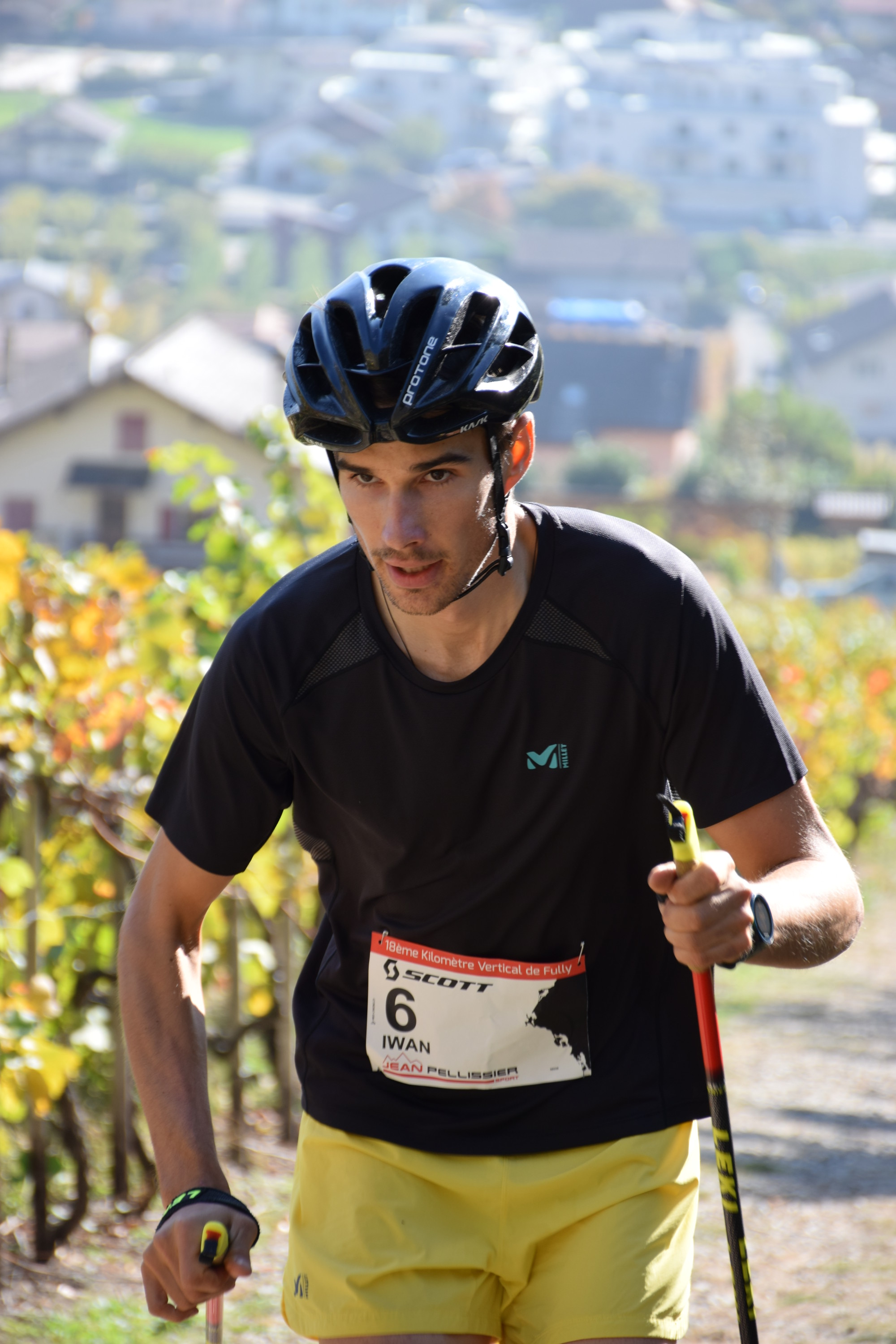
- Arnold in 2018

Personal information
- Born: 30 September 1991 (age 34) Brig-Glis, Switzerland
- Height: 1.85 m (6 ft 1 in)
- Weight: 75 kg (165 lb)

Sport
- Country: Switzerland
- Sport: Ski mountaineering
Medal record
Representing Switzerland
Men's ski mountaineering
World Championships
Gold medal – first place	2017 Tambre	Sprint race
Gold medal – first place	2021 Comapedrosa La Massana	Sprint race
Silver medal – second place	2021 Comapedrosa La Massana	Men's relay
Silver medal – second place	2019 Villars-sur-Ollon	Sprint race
European Championships
Silver medal – second place	2016 Salvan/Les Marécottes	Sprint race

Iwan Arnold (born 30 September 1991) is a former Swiss ski mountaineer.

== Career ==
On 3 February 2019, Arnold won his first World Cup event at Le Dévoluy in France. He won his first World Championship gold medal in 2017 in the sprint race. He again won a gold medal in the sprint race in 2021.

Arnold announced his retirement in April 2025.
