= Fatton =

Fatton is a surname. Notable people with the surname include:

- Jacques Fatton (1925–2011), Swiss footballer
- Marianne Fatton (born 1995), Swiss ski mountaineer
