= Gianfranco Stella =

Italian cross-country skier (born 1938)

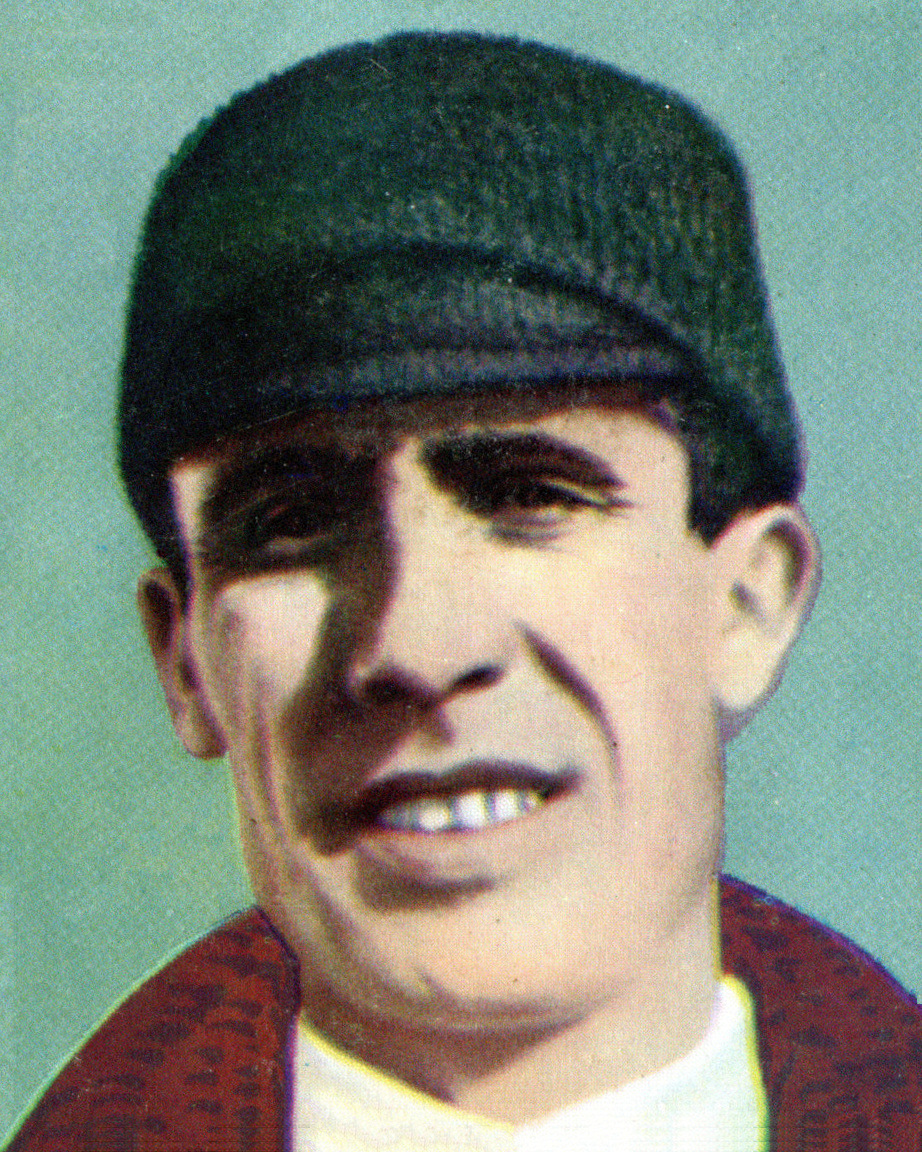

Personal information
- Born: 20 December 1938 (age 87) Asiago, Italy
- Height: 1.80 m (5 ft 11 in)
- Weight: 76 kg (168 lb)

Sport
- Sport: Skiing
- Club: Sport Union Asiago Ski
Medal record
Representing Italy
Cross-country skiing
World Championships
Bronze medal – third place	1966 Oslo	4×10 km
Ski mountaineering
Silver medal – second place	1975 World Championship	Military team

Gianfranco "Franco" Stella (born 20 December 1938) is a former Italian cross country skier. He competed in the 15 km and 30 km events at the 1964, 1968 and 1972 Winter Olympics with the best result of 13th place in the 15 km in 1998. Stella won a bronze medal in the 4×10 km relay at the 1966 FIS Nordic World Ski Championships in Oslo.

Stella also won the 1971 Trofeo Mezzalama ski mountaineering event together with his brothers Aldo and Roberto as well as in the 1973 edition together with Aldo and Palmiro Serafini, and finished second in the military team category together with Aldo and Leo Vidi in the 1975 edition of the same competition, which was carried out as the first World Championship of Skimountaineering.

Further notable results:

- 1964: 3rd, Italian men's championships of cross-country skiing, 50 km
- 1966: 3rd, Italian men's championships of cross-country skiing, 30 km
- 1968:
  - 1st, Italian men's championships of cross-country skiing, 30 km
  - 1st, Italian men's championships of cross-country skiing, 15 km
- 1970: 2nd, Italian men's championships of cross-country skiing, 15 km
- 1972: 2nd, Italian men's championships of cross-country skiing, 15 km
