= Aldo Stella (skier) =

Personal information
- Born: 29 January 1943 (age 83) Asiago, Italy

Sport
- Sport: Skiing
Medal record
ski mountaineering
| Silver medal – second place | 1975 World Championship (Trofeo Mezzalama) | military team |

Aldo Stella (born 29 January 1943) is an Italian ski mountaineer and former cross-country skier. Stella was born in Asiago. He participated at the 1968 Winter Olympics, when he placed sixth together with Giulio de Florian, Franco Nones and Palmiro Serafini in the 4 × 10 kilometres relay event and seventeenth in the 50 kilometres race of cross-country skiing.

Together with his brothers Gianfranco and Roberto he won the 1971 Trofeo Mezzalama as well as together with Gianfranco and Palmiro Serafini the 1973 edition. In 1975, when the Trofeo Mezzalama was carried out as the first World Championship of Skimountaineering, Aldo and his brother Gianfranco placed second in the military teams category, together with Leo Vidi.

== Further notable results ==
- 1968: 2nd, Italian men's championships of cross-country skiing, 15 km
- 1973: 3rd, Italian men's championships of cross-country skiing, 15 km
