= Jon Kistler =

Swiss ski mountaineer (born 2003)

Personal information
- Born: 23 June 2003 (age 23) Zürich, Switzerland
- Height: 1.78 m (5 ft 10 in)
- Weight: 63 kg (139 lb)

Sport
- Country: Switzerland
- Sport: Ski mountaineering
Medal record
Representing Switzerland
Men's ski mountaineering
Representing Switzerland
Olympic Games
Silver medal – second place	2026 Milano Cortina	Mixed relay
World Championships
Bronze medal – third place	2025 Morgins	Sprint race

Jon Kistler (born 25 June 2003) is a Swiss ski mountaineer. He represented Switzerland at the 2026 Winter Olympics, where he won a silver medal in the mixed race.

== Early life and education ==
Kistler is studying mechanical engineering part-time at ETH Zurich.

== Career ==
Kistler competed at the 2023 World Championship of Ski Mountaineering and won a gold medal in the youth mixed relay, with a time of 29:45.9, and a silver medal in the under-20 sprint race with a time of 2:53.539. He again competed at the 2025 World Championship of Ski Mountaineering and won a bronze medal in the sprint race with a time of 2:50.05. He also won a gold medal in the under-20 sprint race.

During the opening race of the 2025–26 ISMF Ski Mountaineering World Cup on 7 December 2025, Kistler earned his first career World Cup victory with a time of 2:40.7.

In January 2026, he was selected to represent Switzerland at the 2026 Winter Olympics. On 19 February 2026, he competed in the sprint race. During the heats and semifinals, he posted the fastest times, and advanced to the final. During the final he finished in sixth place with a time of 2:38.36. On 21 February 2026, he won a silver medal in the mixed relay, along with Marianne Fatton, with a time of 27:09.30.
