= Calliari =

Calliari is an Italian surname. Notable people with the surname include:

- Amedeo Calliari, (born 1988), Italian footballer
- Marco Calliari, Canadian singer-songwriter
- Orietta Calliari, (born 1969), Italian ski mountaineer
