= Silvia Rocca =

Italian ski mountaineer (born 1983)

Personal information
- Born: 1983 (age 42–43)

Sport
- Sport: Skiing
Medal record
Ski mountaineering
Representing Italy
World Championships
Gold medal – first place	2010 World Championship	Relay
Bronze medal – third place	2010 World Championship	Team

Silvia Rocca (born 1983) is an Italian ski mountaineer.

== Selected results ==
- 2010:
  - 1st, World Championship relay race (together with Roberta Pedranzini and Francesca Martinelli)
  - 3rd, World Championship team race (together with Corinne Clos)
  - 8th, World Championship single race
  - 8th, World Championship combination ranking

=== Trofeo Mezzalama ===
- 2009: 2nd, together with Orietta Calliari and Corinne Clos

=== Pierra Menta ===
- 2010: 3rd, together with Corinne Clos

=== Patrouille des Glaciers ===
- 2010: 2nd, together with Roberta Pedranzini and Francesca Martinelli
