= Mattia Coletti =

Italian ski mountaineer

Personal information
- Born: 25 September 1984 (age 41) Sondalo, Italy

Sport
- Sport: Skiing

Mattia Coletti (born 25 September 1984) is an Italian ski mountaineer.

Coletti was born in Sondalo. He started ski mountaineering in 1998 and competed first in the Trofeo Folgore race in the same year. He has been member of the Italian national team since 2000.

== Selected results ==
- 2003:
  - 3rd, European Championship single race "juniors" class
- 2006:
  - 1st, Italian Championship
  - 2nd, World Cup "espoirs" class
- 2007:
  - 6th, Trofeo Mezzalama (together with Daniele Pedrini and Lorenzo Holzknecht)
