= Daniele Pedrini =

Italian ski mountaineer (born 1976)

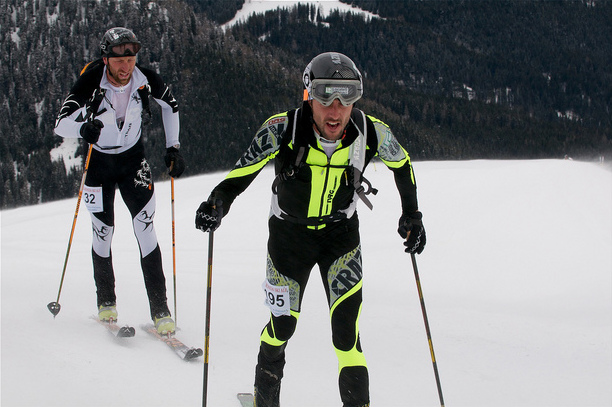
- Pietro Lanfranchi (N° 195; right) and Daniele Pedrini (N° 32; left) at the 2nd Palaronda SkiAlp, 2010

Personal information
- Born: October 29, 1976 (age 49) Bormio, Italy

Sport
- Sport: Skiing
- Club: Sci Club Alta Valtellina

Daniele Pedrini (born October 29, 1976) is an Italian ski mountaineer.

Pedrini was born in Bormio. He is member of the Sci Club Alta Valtellina.

== Selected results ==
- 2006:
  - 2nd, Trofeo Parravicini (together with Guido Giacomelli)
  - 3rd, Adamello Ski Raid (together with Guido Giacomelli and Graziano Boscacci and Ivan Murada)
- 2007:
  - 1st: Gara del Pizzo Scalino (together with Graziano Boscacci)
  - 2nd, Sellaronda Skimarathon (together with Mirco Mezzanotte)
- 2008:
  - 1st, Pila Race (together with Pietro Lanfranchi)
  - 1st, Gara Scialpinistica "Pizzo Tre Signori" (together with Pietro Lanfranchi)
- 2009:
  - 2nd, Trofeo Besimauda
  - 2nd, Transclautana
  - 8th, European Championship team race (together with Pietro Lanfranchi)
- 2010:
  - 5th, World Championship team race (together with Pietro Lanfranchi)
  - 2nd, Sellaronda Skimarathon (together with Graziano Boscacci)

=== Pierra Menta ===
- 2007: 8th, together with Ivan Murada
- 2008: 10th, together with Pietro Lanfranchi
- 2009: 8th, together with Pietro Lanfranchi
- 2010: 6th, together with Pietro Lanfranchi

=== Trofeo Mezzalama ===
- 2007: 6th, together with Lorenzo Holzknecht and Mattia Coletti
- 2009: 2nd, together with Jean Pellissier and Damiano Lenzi
- 2011: 2nd, together with Pietro Lanfranchi and Alain Seletto
