= Matteo Eydallin =

Italian ski mountaineer (born 1985)

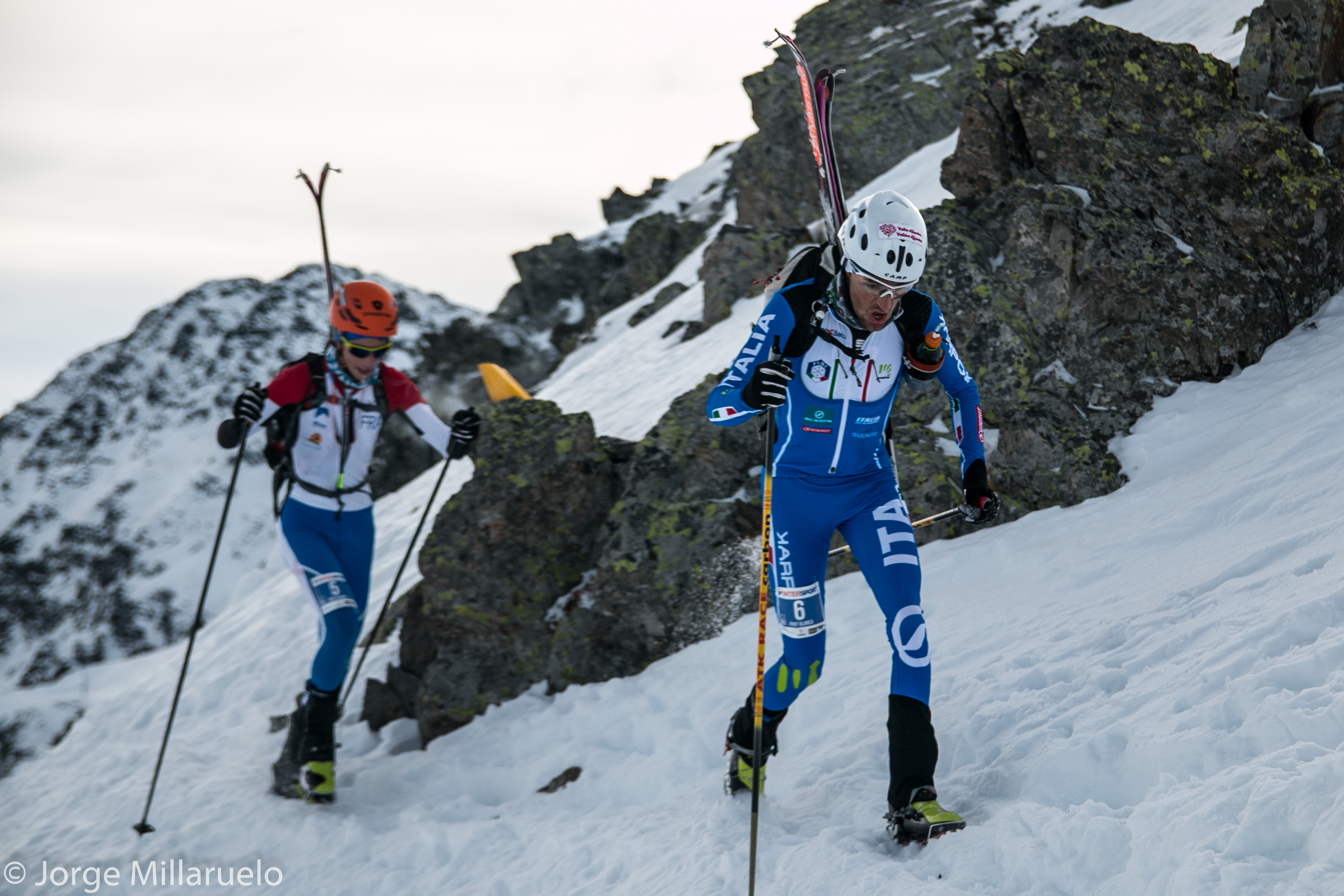

Personal information
- Born: 6 November 1985 (age 40) Turin, Italy

Sport
- Sport: Skiing
Medal record
Ski mountaineering
Representing Italy
World Championships
Gold medal – first place	2011 Claut	Team
Gold medal – first place	2011 Claut	Relay
European Championships
Gold medal – first place	2009 Alpago	Team
Bronze medal – third place	2012 Pelvoux	Relay

Matteo Eydallin (born 6 November 1985) is an Italian ski mountaineer.

== Career ==
Eydallin was born in Turin and lives in Sauze d'Oulx. In 2003, when he started ski mountaineering, he competed first in the Trofeo Bozzetti event and became a member of the national selection.

== Selected results ==
- 2005:
  - 1st, European Championship single "juniors" race
  - 1st, European Championship "juniors" vertical race
- 2009:
  - 1st, European Championship team race (together with Denis Trento)
  - 1st, Tour du Rutor (together with Denis Trento)
  - 1st, Trofeo "Rinaldo Maffeis" (together with Denis Trento)
  - 1st, Trofeo Mezzalama (together with Manfred Reichegger and Denis Trento)
  - 2nd, Pierra Menta (together with Denis Trento)
  - 2nd, Valtellina Orobie World Cup race
- 2010:
  - 5th, World Championship single race
- 2011:
  - 1st, World Championship team race, together with Denis Trento
  - 1st, World Championship relay, together with Manfred Reichegger, Robert Antonioli and Denis Trento
  - 1st, Tour du Rutor, together with Denis Trento
- 2012:
  - 3rd, European Championship relay, together with Damiano Lenzi, Manfred Reichegger and Robert Antonioli
  - 6th, European Championship single
  - 6th, European Championship team, together with Denis Trento

=== Patrouille des Glaciers ===
- 2010: 2nd, together with Pietro Lanfranchi and Manfred Reichegger

=== Pierra Menta ===
- 2009: 2nd, together with Denis Trento
- 2011: 3rd, together with Denis Trento
- 2012: 2nd, together with Denis Trento
