= Orietta Calliari =

Italian ski mountaineer

Personal information
- Born: 22 March 1969 (age 57)

Sport
- Sport: Skiing

Orietta Calliari (born 22 March 1969) is an Italian ski mountaineer from Romeno. She lives in Busca.

== Selected results ==
- 2003:
  - 2nd, Sellaronda Skimarathon (together with Silvana Iori)
- 2004:
  - 1st, Sellaronda Skimarathon (together with Roberta Secco)
- 2005:
  - 1st, Sellaronda Skimarathon (together with Roberta Secco)
- 2006
  - 1st, Italian Cup
  - 1st, Sellaronda Skimarathon (together with Roberta Secco)
  - 7th, 2006 World Championship of Ski Mountaineering team race (together with Astrid Renzler)
- 2008:
  - 1st, Sellaronda Skimarathon (together with Annemarie Gross)
- 2009:
  - 2nd, Trofeo Mezzalama (together with Corinne Clos and Silvia Rocca)
