= Pietro Lanfranchi =

Italian ski mountaineer

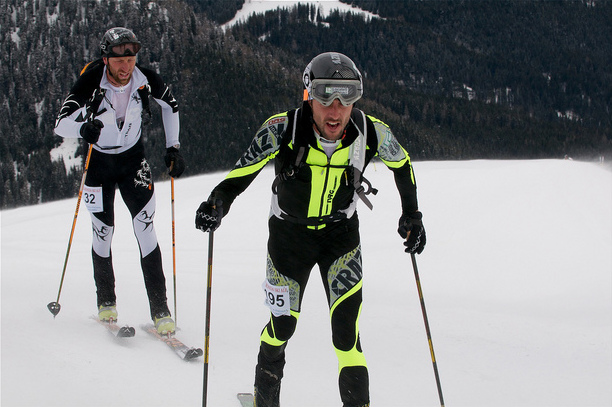
- Lanfranchi (N° 195); 2010 Palaronda SkiAlp

Personal information
- Born: 7 November 1978 (age 47)

Sport
- Sport: Skiing
- Club: Lame Perrel GSA Ranica

Pietro Lanfranchi (born 7 November 1978) from Bergamo is an Italian ski mountaineer. He is member of the Lame Perrel GSA Ranica and the national ski mountaineering team.

== Selected results ==
- 2007:
  - 3rd: Gara del Pizzo Scalino (together with Marco Majori)
- 2008:
  - 1st, Pila Race (together with Daniele Pedrini)
  - 1st, Gara Scialpinistica "Pizzo Tre Signori" (together with Daniele Pedrini)
  - 2nd, Trofeo Angelo Gherardi
  - 2nd, Trofeo Parravicini
- 2009:
  - 1st, Sci Alpinistica dell'Adamello
  - 2nd, Trofeo Besimauda
  - 3rd, Transclautana
  - 8th, European Championship team race (together with Daniele Pedrini)
- 2010:
  - 5th, World Championship team race (together with Daniele Pedrini)
- 2011:
  - 4th, World Championship team race (together with Damiano Lenzi)
  - 7th, World Championship vertical race
  - 9th, World Championship vertical, total ranking
- 2012:
  - 5th, European Championship vertical race
  - 2nd, Sellaronda Skimarathon (together with Florent Troillet)

=== Pierra Menta ===
- 2008: 10th, together with Daniele Pedrini
- 2009: 8th, together with Daniele Pedrini
- 2010: 6th, together with Daniele Pedrini
- 2011: 8th, together with Marc Pinsach Rubirola
- 2012: 3rd, together with William Bon Mardion

=== Trofeo Mezzalama ===
- 2009: 4th, together with Graziano Boscacci and Ivan Murada
- 2011: 2nd, together with Daniele Pedrini and Alain Seletto

=== Patrouille des Glaciers ===
- 2010: 2nd, together with Matteo Eydallin and Manfred Reichegger
