= Bruno Bonaldi =

Italian ski mountaineer (1944–2016)

Personal information
- Born: 17 September 1944
- Died: 7 July 2016 (aged 71)

Sport
- Sport: Skiing
- Club: ASC Ladinia Alta Badia
Medal record
ski mountaineering
Gold medal – first place	1975 World Championship (Trofeo Mezzalama)	military team

Bruno Bonaldi (17 September 1944 – 7 July 2016) was an Italian ski mountaineer and cross-country skiing amateur of the ASC Ladinia Alta Badia.

Together with Angelo Genuin and Luigi Weiss, he placed first in the military team category in the 1975 Trofeo Mezzalama edition, which was carried out as the first World Championship of Skimountaineering.

Bonaldi died on 7 July 2016 at the age of 71
