= Giulia Murada =

Italian ski mountaineer (born 1998)

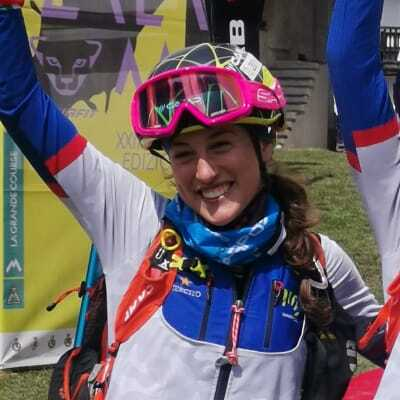
- Murada in 2023

Personal information
- Born: 3 July 1998 (age 27) Sondrio, Italy
- Height: 1.63 m (5 ft 4 in)
- Weight: 50 kg (110 lb)

Sport
- Country: Italy
- Sport: Ski mountaineering
Medal record
Women's ski mountaineering
Representing Italy
World Championships
| Silver medal – second place | 2017 Tambre | Sprint race |
| Silver medal – second place | 2023 Boí Taüll | Team race |
| Silver medal – second place | 2023 Boí Taüll | Mixed relay |
| Bronze medal – third place | 2023 Boí Taüll | Individual race |

Giulia Murada (born 3 July 1998) is an Italian ski mountaineer. She will represent Italy at the 2026 Winter Olympics.

== Career ==
Murada began ski mountaineering at 12 years old after watching her father, Ivan, race. She made her national team debut for Italy at the 2014 European Championships. She competed at the 2021 ISMF Long Distance Team World Championships and won a gold medal in the team race, along with Alba De Silvestro.

She competed at the 2023 World Championship of Ski Mountaineering and won a silver medal in the team race, along with De Silvestro, with a time of 2:15:53.4, and a silver medal in the mixed relay, along with Nicolò Ernesto Canclini, with a time of 26:56.8. She also won a bronze medal in the individual race with a time of 1:20:55.5. She also won a bronze medal in the individual race with a time of 1:20:55.5.

During the opening race of the 2025–26 ISMF Ski Mountaineering World Cup on 7 December 2025, she finished in second place in the sprint race.

== Personal life ==
Murada's father, Ivan Murada, is a former ski mountaineer.
