= Mirko Stangalino =

Italian ski mountaineer (born 1946)

Personal information
- Full name: Mirko Remo Stangalino
- Born: 18 August 1946 (age 79)

Sport
- Sport: Skiing
Medal record
ski mountaineering
| Gold medal – first place | 1975 World Championship (Trofeo Mezzalama) | civilian team |

Mirko Remo Stangalino (born 18 August 1946) is an Italian ski mountaineer.

Together with Renzo Meynet and Osvaldo Ronc, he placed first in the civilian team category in the 1975 Trofeo Mezzalama edition, which was carried out as the first World Championship of Skimountaineering.
