= Luigi Weiss =

Italian biathlete and ski mountaineer

Personal information
- Full name: Luigi Weiss
- Nickname: Gigi
- Born: 17 December 1951 (age 74) Vattaro, Italy
- Height: 1.75 m (5 ft 9 in)

Sport

Professional information
- Sport: Biathlon
- World Cup debut: 13 January 1978

Olympic Games
- Teams: 2 (1976, 1980)
- Medals: 0

World Championships
- Teams: 7 (1975, 1977, 1978, 1979, 1981, 1982, 1983)
- Medals: 1 (0 gold)

World Cup
- Seasons: 7 (1977/78–1983/84)
- Individual victories: 0
- Individual podiums: 1
Medal record
Men's biathlon
Representing Italy
World Championships
Bronze medal – third place	1979 Ruhpolding	10 km sprint
Men's ski mountaineering
Representing Italy
World Championships
Gold medal – first place	1975 Trofeo Mezzalama	Military team

Luigi "Gigi" Weiss (born 17 December 1951) is a former Italian biathlete and ski mountaineer.

Weiss was born in Vattaro. Together with Angelo Genuin and Bruno Bonaldi, he placed first in the military team category in the 1975 Trofeo Mezzalama edition, which was carried out as the first World Championship of Skimountaineering.

At the 1979 Biathlon World Championships, Weiss won bronze in the 10 km sprint. This was the first medal for an Italian at the Biathlon World Championships, and as the race also counted in the World Cup, it was also the first podium finish for an Italian in the World Cup.

== Biathlon results ==
All results are sourced from the International Biathlon Union.

=== Olympic Games ===
Event	Individual	Sprint	Relay
(Austria) 1976 Innsbruck	—	—N/a	6th
(United States) 1980 Lake Placid	—	18th	9th

*Sprint was added as an event in 1980.

=== World Championships ===
1 medal (1 bronze)

Event	Individual	Sprint	Relay
(Italy) 1975 Antholz-Anterselva	49th	—	—
(Norway) 1977 Lillehammer	25th	27th	7th
(Austria) 1978 Hochfilzen	11th	7th	8th
(West Germany) 1979 Ruhpolding	57th	Bronze	5th
(Finland) 1981 Lahti	36th	38th	9th
(Soviet Union) 1982 Minsk	37th	14th	5th
(Italy) 1983 Antholz-Anterselva	—	27th	10th

*During Olympic seasons competitions are only held for those events not included in the Olympic program.

Further achievements

- 1973: 3rd, Italian championships of biathlon
- 1974: 3rd, Italian championships of biathlon, sprint
- 1975: 3rd, Italian championships of biathlon, sprint
- 1976:
  - 2nd, Italian championships of biathlon, sprint
- 1977: 2nd, Italian championships of biathlon
- 1978: 1st, Italian championships of biathlon, sprint
- 1979:
  - 1st, Italian championships of biathlon
  - 2nd, Italian championships of biathlon, sprint
- 1980:
  - 2nd, Italian championships of biathlon
- 1981: 1st, Italian championships of biathlon, sprint
- 1982:
  - 2nd, Italian championships of biathlon, sprint
  - 3rd, Italian championships of biathlon
