= Werner Marti (ski mountaineer) =

Swiss ski mountaineer (born 1989)

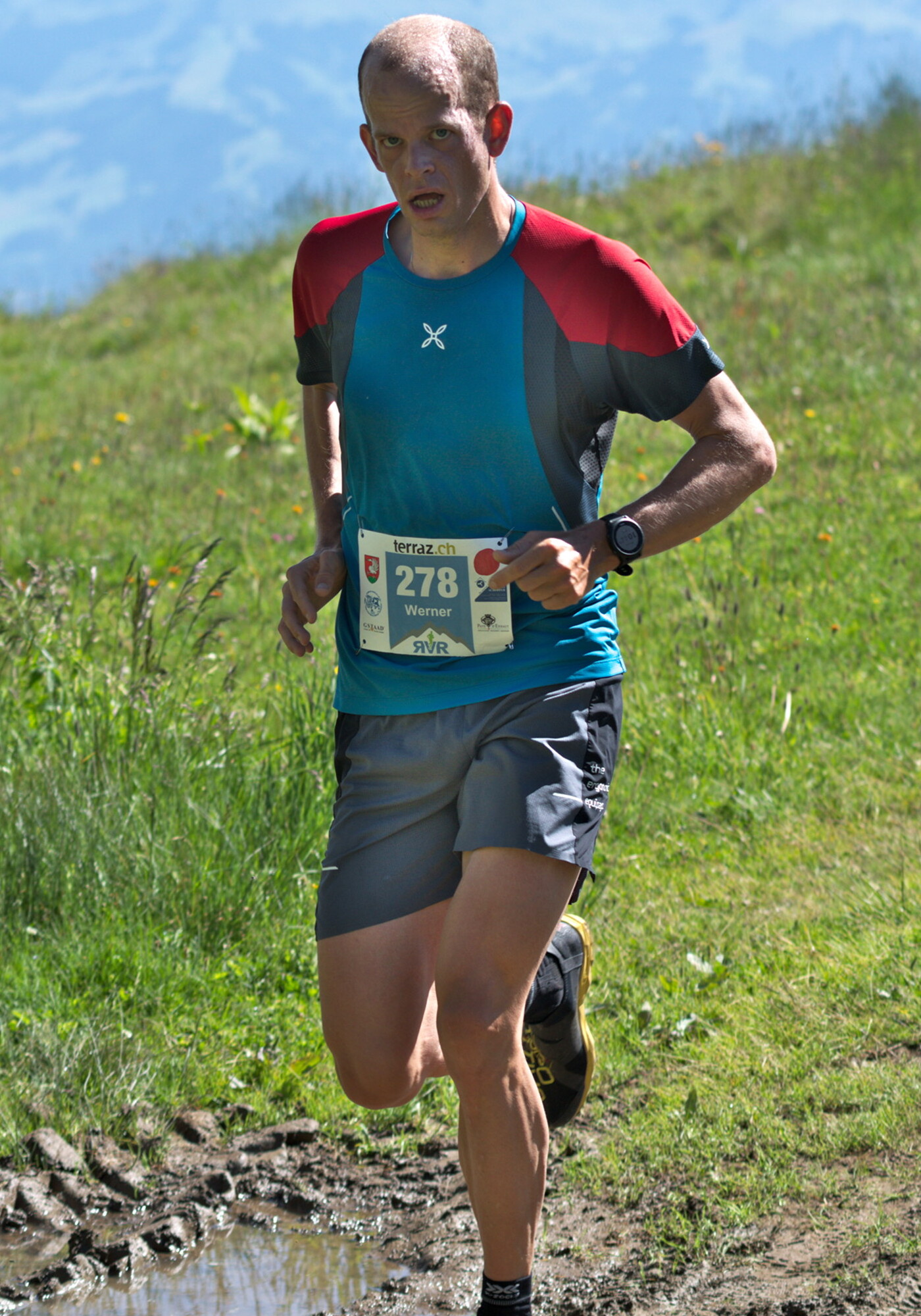
- Marti in 2020

Personal information
- Born: 25 December 1989 (age 36) Grindelwald, Switzerland
- Height: 1.81 m (5 ft 11 in)
- Weight: 69 kg (152 lb)

Sport
- Country: Switzerland
- Sport: Ski mountaineering
Medal record
Men's ski mountaineering
Representing Switzerland
World Championships
Gold medal – first place	2019 Villars-sur-Ollon	Team race
Gold medal – first place	2019 Villars-sur-Ollon	Vertical race
Silver medal – second place	2021 Comapedrosa	Relay race
Bronze medal – third place	2017 Alpago	Vertical race
Bronze medal – third place	2021 Comapedrosa	Vertical race
European Championships
Gold medal – first place	2022 Boi Taull	Individual race
Gold medal – first place	2022 Boi Taull	Vertical race
Silver medal – second place	2024 Flaine / Chamonix	Vertical race

Werner Marti (born 25 December 1989) is a Swiss ski mountaineer. He is a two-time World Champion

== Career ==
Marti competed at the 2019 World Championships and won a gold medal in the vertical race, with a time of 25:19.0 He also won a gold medal in the team race, along with Rémi Bonnet, with a time of 50:37.0.

Marti competed at the 2022 European Championships and won a gold medal in the vertical race with a time of 22:55. He also won a gold medal in the individual race with a time of 1:23.53.5.
