= Palmiro Serafini =

Italian cross-country skier (1945–2013)

Personal information
- Born: 27 February 1945 Pievepelago, Italy
- Died: 28 December 2013 (aged 68)

Sport
- Sport: Skiing

Palmiro Serafini (27 February 1945 – 28 December 2013) was an Italian ski mountaineer and cross-country skier.

Serafini was born in Pievepelago. He participated at the 1968 Winter Olympics, when he placed sixth together with Giulio de Florian, Franco Nones and Aldo Stella in the 4 × 10 kilometres relay event of cross-country skiing. Together with the brothers Gianfranco and Aldo Stella he won the 1973 Trofeo Mezzalama ski mountaineering competition.

== Further notable results ==
- 1967: 3rd, Italian men's championships of cross-country skiing, 15 km
- 1968:
  - 3rd, Italian men's championships of cross-country skiing, 50 km
  - 3rd, Italian men's championships of cross-country skiing, 15 km
