= Anselmo Viviani =

Italian cross-country skier

Anselmo Viviani (born 1915, date of death unknown) was an Italian cross-country skier who competed in the 1930s and 1940s. In 1937, in the rank of an Alpino (Soldier E-1), together in team with Tenente Giuseppe Fabre and Sergente Luigi Perenni he won Gold at the Trofeo Mezzalama race. In the same year, he finished second in the 40 km event of the Italian men's championships of cross-country skiing.

A photograph showing Viviani during his participation at the Giro delle Dolomiti in Cortina d'Ampezzo demonstrates that he served in the IV Legione / Milizia Forestale in Turin in 1940. The Milizia Forestale was an arm of the Blackshirts devoted to forestry. Together with three friends, he founded the central school for excursion cross-country skiing (Italian: Scuola Centrale Sci Fondo Escursionistico) of the Club Alpino Italiano. At the age of 92 years, and 30 years after his success, he spoke at the press conference of the 16th Trofeo Mezzalama in April 2007.
