= Renzo Meynet =

Italian ski mountaineer

Medal record

ski mountaineering
Gold medal – first place	1975 World Championship (Trofeo Mezzalama)	civilian team

Renzo Meynet is an Italian ski mountaineer and mountain guide.

Together with Osvaldo Ronc and Mirko Stangalino, he placed first in the civilian team category in the 1975 Trofeo Mezzalama edition, which was carried out as the first World Championship of Skimountaineering.

== Publications ==
- Nemo Canetta, Renzo Meynet: Guida allo sci di fondo nelle Alpi., Milano, 1985
