= Lorenzo Squinobal =

Italian mountaineer (born 1951)

Personal information
- Born: 15 January 1951 (age 75)

Sport
- Sport: Skiing
Medal record
ski mountaineering
Gold medal – first place	1975 World Championship (Trofeo Mezzalama)	mountain guides team

Lorenzo Squinobal (born 15 January 1951) from Gressoney-Saint-Jean is an Italian mountain climber, mountain guide and ski mountaineer.

Together with his brothers Oreste and Arturo, he placed first in the mountain guides team category in the 1975 Trofeo Mezzalama edition, which was carried out as the first World Championship of Skimountaineering. Together with Arturo and Danilo Barell he also won the 1978 Trofeo Mezzalama in the same category.
