= Damiano Lenzi =

Italian ski mountaineer and cross-country skier

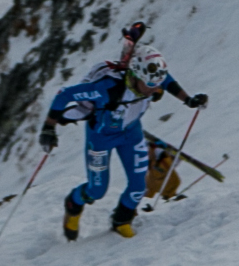

Personal information
- Born: 14 August 1987 (age 38) Domodossola, VB, Piedmont

Sport
- Sport: Skiing
Medal record
Ski mountaineering
Representing Italy
World Championships
Gold medal – first place	2010 Gran Valira	Relay
Bronze medal – third place	2010 Gran Valira	Team
European Championships
Gold medal – first place	2009 Alpago	Relay
Bronze medal – third place	2012 Pelvoux	Relay

Damiano Lenzi (born 14 August 1987, Domodossola, VB, Piedmont, Italy) is an Italian ski mountaineer and cross-country skier, Italian Army member, Mountain Warfare Troops ("Alpini").

== Selected results ==
- 2009:
  - 1st, European Championship relay race (together with Dennis Brunod, Manfred Reichegger and Lorenzo Holzknecht)
  - 1st, "Pizzo Tre Signori"
  - 1st, "Trofeo Fiou" race (together with Dennis Brunod)
  - 2nd, Trofeo Mezzalama (together with Jean Pellissier and Daniele Pedrini)
  - 6th, European Championship vertical race
- 2010:
  - 1st, World Championship relay race (together with Lorenzo Holzknecht, Dennis Brunod and Manfred Reichegger)
  - 3rd, World Championship team race (together with Lorenzo Holzknecht)
  - 6th, World Championship vertical race
  - 6th, World Championship combination ranking
  - 7th, World Championship single race
- 2011:
  - 4th, World Championship vertical race
  - 4th, World Championship team race (together with Pietro Lanfranchi)
  - 7th, World Championship vertical, total ranking
- 2012:
  - 3rd, European Championship relay, together with Matteo Eydallin, Manfred Reichegger and Robert Antonioli
  - 4th, European Championship team, together with Michele Boscacci
- 2013:
  - 1st, Trofeo Mezzalama (together with Manfred Reichegger and Matteo Eydallin)

=== Pierra Menta ===
- 2010: 4th, together with Lorenzo Holzknecht
- 2011: 5th, together with Manfred Reichegger
- 2014: 1st, together with Matteo Eydallin
- 2015: 1st, together with Matteo Eydallin
- 2017: 1st, together with Matteo Eydallin

=== Trofeo Mezzalama ===
- 2013: 1st, together with Manfred Reichegger (IT), Matteo Eydallin (IT) - Centro Sportivo Esercito (Italian Army Sporting Center Team): 04:16:37;
