= Luigi Perenni =

Italian skier

Personal information
- Born: 6 June 1913 Kiens, Italy
- Died: 28 August 1943 (aged 30) Cervinia, Italy

Sport
- Sport: Skiing

Luigi Perenni, before 1934 Prenn, (born Alois Prenn, 6 June 1913 – 28 August 1943) was an Italian military officer and skier.

Perenni, son of Vincenzo Prenn, was born in Kiens and grew up in Innichen. As a soldier of the Italian Army he placed 3rd in the 18 km cross-country skiing event of the Italian mastership of 1933. In 1934 he was transferred to the new founded mountain warfare school of the Italian Army called Scuola Militare di Alpinismo (today: Centro Addestramento Alpino).

In the rank of a Sergente he was with Enrico Silvestri, Stefano Sertorelli and Sisto Scilligo member of the military patrol team, which won the gold medal at the 1936 Winter Olympics.

Together with his colleagues Francesco Vida and Carlo Ronc he won the Trofeo Mezzalama, and in the following year once more together Giuseppe Fabre and Anselmo Viviani. At the relay event of the Sport invernali Mondiali he finished 3rd together with Achille Compagnoni, Maurizio Celeste and Giovani Fantoni.

When he died in Cervinia in a mountaineering accident during a military exercise, he had the rank of a Tenente. The "Luigi Perenni" barracks in Courmayeur are named in his honor. His brother Giovanni was also a successful skier.

Further notable results were:

- 1933: 3rd, Italian men's championships of cross-country skiing, 18 km
- 1940: 2nd, Italian men's championships of cross-country skiing, 36 km
