= Mario Corti (skier) =

Italian Nordic combined skier and sports official

Mario Corti was an early Italian Nordic combined skier and sports official.

Corti was the first Italian champion of Nordic combined and cross-country skiing, He was member of the 1901 founded Ski Club Torino, where he was the fourth president from 1920 to 1936. During this period he invented the legendary Trofeo Mezzalama. Meanwhile, he was also president of the Federazione Italiana dello Sci from 1922 to 1924.

== Selected results ==
- 1909:
  - 1st, Italian championships of Nordic combined
  - 1st, Italian men's championships of cross-country skiing, 18 km
  - 2nd, Italian championships of ski jumping
- 1910:
  - 1st, Italian championships of Nordic combined
  - 1st, Italian championships of ski jumping
