= Alba De Silvestro =

Italian ski mountaineer (born 1995)

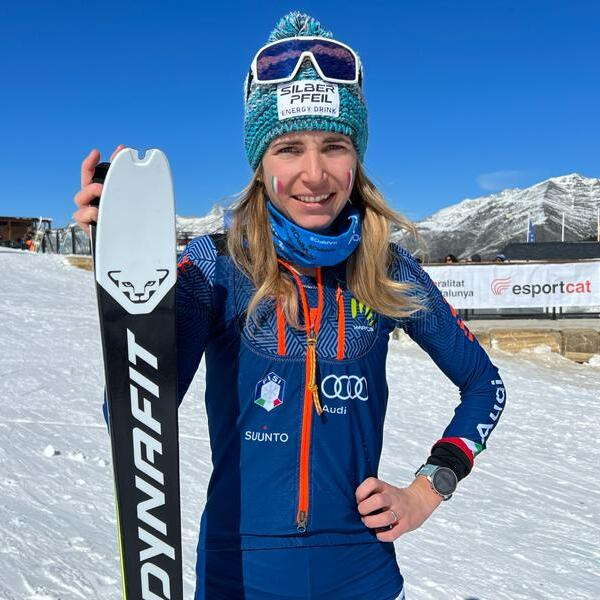
- De Silvestro at the 2023 World Championship

Personal information
- Born: 3 October 1995 (age 30) Comelico Superiore, Italy
- Height: 1.68 m (5 ft 6 in)
- Weight: 53 kg (117 lb)

Sport
- Country: Italy
- Sport: Ski mountaineering
Medal record
Women's ski mountaineering
Representing Italy
World Championships
| Gold medal – first place | 2021 Comapedrosa | Relay race |
| Silver medal – second place | 2019 Villars-sur-Ollon | Team race |
| Silver medal – second place | 2019 Villars-sur-Ollon | Individual race |
| Silver medal – second place | 2023 Boí Taüll | Team race |
| Silver medal – second place | 2023 Boí Taüll | Individual race |
| Silver medal – second place | 2025 Morgins | Team race |
| Bronze medal – third place | 2017 Tambre | Team race |
| Bronze medal – third place | 2021 Comapedrosa | Individual race |
| Bronze medal – third place | 2023 Boí Taüll | Vertical race |
European Championships
| Silver medal – second place | 2024 Flaine / Chamonix | Vertical race |
| Bronze medal – third place | 2022 Boí Taüll | Individual race |
| Bronze medal – third place | 2022 Boí Taüll | Relay race |
| Bronze medal – third place | 2024 Flaine / Chamonix | Individual race |

Alba De Silvestro (born 3 October 1995) is an Italian ski mountaineer. She will represent Italy at the 2026 Winter Olympics.

== Career ==
De Silvestro competed at the 2023 World Championship of Ski Mountaineering and won a silver medal in the team race, along with Giulia Murada, with a time of 2:15:53.4, and a silver medal in the individual race with a time 1:20:13.6. She also won a bronze medal in the vertical race with a time of 27:22.2. She again competed at the 2025 World Championship of Ski Mountaineering and won a silver medal in the team race, along with Lisa Moreschini, with a time of 2:22:04.6.

De Silvestro finished the 2024–25 ISMF Ski Mountaineering World Cup in third place in both the vertical and individual race standings. During the opening race of the 2025–26 ISMF Ski Mountaineering World Cup on 6 December 2025, she finished in second place in the mixed relay, along with her husband Michele Boscacci.

== Personal life ==
De Silvestro married fellow ski mountaineer Michele Boscacci on 18 September 2021.
