= Arturo Squinobal =

Italian mountain climber, mountain guide, and ski mountaineer

Personal information
- Born: 16 November 1944 (age 81)

Sport
- Sport: Skiing
Medal record
ski mountaineering
Gold medal – first place	1975 World Championship (Trofeo Mezzalama)	mountain guides team

Arturo Squinobal or Arthur Squinobal (born 16 November 1944) is an Italian mountain climber, mountain guide of Monte Rosa and ski mountaineer from Gressoney-Saint-Jean. He is also director of the skiing school in his hometown.

Together with his brothers Oreste and Lorenzo, he placed first in the mountain guides team category in the 1975 Trofeo Mezzalama edition, which was carried out as the first World Championship of Skimountaineering. Together with Lorenzo and Danilo Barell he also won the 1978 Trofeo Mezzalama in the same category.

Together with his brother Oreste he made he first winter ascent of the South Face of Matterhorn (23 December 1971), the first winter ascent of the Peuterey Integral (26 December 1972, together with Yannick Seigneur, Michel Feuillarade, Marc Galy, and Louis Audoubert), and the first winter ascent of the West Face of Matterhorn (11 January 1978, together with Rolando Albertini, Marco Barmasse, Innocenzo Menabreaz, Leo Pession, Augusto Tamone).

Oreste and Arturo Squinobal's story is told in "Brothers of the Mountains".
