= Roberta Pedranzini =

Italian ski mountaineer (born 1971)

Personal information
- Born: 21 August 1971 (age 55) Bormio, Italy

Sport
- Sport: Skiing
- Club: Sci Club Alta Valtellina
Medal record
Ski mountaineering
Representing Italy
World Championships
Gold medal – first place	2006 World Championship	Single
Gold medal – first place	2006 World Championship	Team
Gold medal – first place	2006 World Championship	Relay
Gold medal – first place	2008 World Championship	Single
Gold medal – first place	2008 World Championship	Vertical race
Gold medal – first place	2008 World Championship	Team
Gold medal – first place	2010 World Championship	Vertical race
Gold medal – first place	2010 World Championship	Team
Gold medal – first place	2010 World Championship	Relay
Silver medal – second place	2006 World Championship	Vertical race
Silver medal – second place	2008 World Championship	Relay
Silver medal – second place	2010 World Championship	Single
Silver medal – second place	2011 World Championship	Team
European Championships
Gold medal – first place	2007 European Championship	Team
Gold medal – first place	2007 European Championship	Relay
Gold medal – first place	2009 European Championship	Single
Gold medal – first place	2009 European Championship	Vertical race
Gold medal – first place	2009 European Championship	Team
Gold medal – first place	2009 European Championship	Relay
Silver medal – second place	2007 European Championship	Single
Silver medal – second place	2007 European Championship	Vertical race

Roberta Pedranzini (born 21 August 1971) is an Italian ski mountaineer.

Pedranzini was born in Bormio. She started ski mountaineering in 2000 and competed first in the Giro del Monviso race in 2003. She has been member of the Italian national team since 2004.

== Selected results ==
- 2004:
  - 2nd, Sellaronda Skimarathon (together with Francesca Martinelli)
- 2005:
  - 7th, European Championship single race
- 2006:
  - 1st, World Championship single race
  - 1st, World Championship team race (together with Francesca Martinelli)
  - 1st, World Championship relay race (together with Francesca Martinelli, Chiara Raso and Gloriana Pellissier)
  - 1st, World Cup single
  - 1st, Tour du Rutor (together with Francesca Martinelli)
  - 2nd, World Championship vertical race
- 2007:
  - 1st, European Championship team race (together with Francesca Martinelli)
  - 1st, European Championship relay race (together with Francesca Martinelli and Gloriana Pellissier)
  - 1st, European Championship combination ranking
  - 1st, World Cup single
  - 1st, Sellaronda Skimarathon (together with Francesca Martinelli)
  - 2nd, European Championship vertical race
  - 2nd, European Championship single race
- 2008:
  - 1st, World Championship single race
  - 1st, World Championship vertical race
  - 1st, World Championship team race (together with Francesca Martinelli)
  - 1st, World Championship combination ranking
  - 1st, Dolomiti Cup team (together with Francesca Martinelli)
  - 2nd, World Championship relay race (together with Gloriana Pellissier, Francesca Martinelli and Elisa Fleischmann)
- 2009:
  - 1st, European Championship single race
  - 1st, European Championship vertical race
  - 1st, European Championship team race (together with Francesca Martinelli)
  - 1st, European Championship relay race (together with Gloriana Pellissier and Francesca Martinelli)
  - 1st, European Championship combination ranking
  - 1st, Tour du Rutor (together with Francesca Martinelli)
  - 2nd, Dachstein Xtreme
  - 3rd, Valtellina Orobie World Cup race
- 2010:
  - 1st, World Championship relay race (together with Francesca Martinelli and Silvia Rocca)
  - 1st, World Championship vertical race
  - 1st, World Championship team race (together with Francesca Martinelli)
  - 1st, World Championship combination ranking
  - 2nd, World Championship single race
- 2011:
  - 2nd, World Championship team race (together with Francesca Martinelli)
  - 1st and course record, Sellaronda Skimarathon (together with Francesca Martinelli)

=== Pierra Menta ===
- 2006: 1st, together with Francesca Martinelli
- 2007: 1st, together with Francesca Martinelli
- 2008: 2nd, together with Francesca Martinelli
- 2009: 1st, together with Francesca Martinelli
- 2010: 1st, together with Francesca Martinelli
- 2011: 2nd, together with Francesca Martinelli
- 2012: 1st, together with Francesca Martinelli

=== Trofeo Mezzalama ===
- 2007: 1st, together with Francesca Martinelli and Gloriana Pellissier
- 2009: 1st, together with Francesca Martinelli and Laëtitia Roux
- 2011: 1st, together with Francesca Martinelli and Gloriana Pellissier

=== Patrouille des Glaciers ===
- 2010: 2nd, together with Silvia Rocca and Francesca Martinelli
