= Werner Marti =

Swiss lawyer and politician

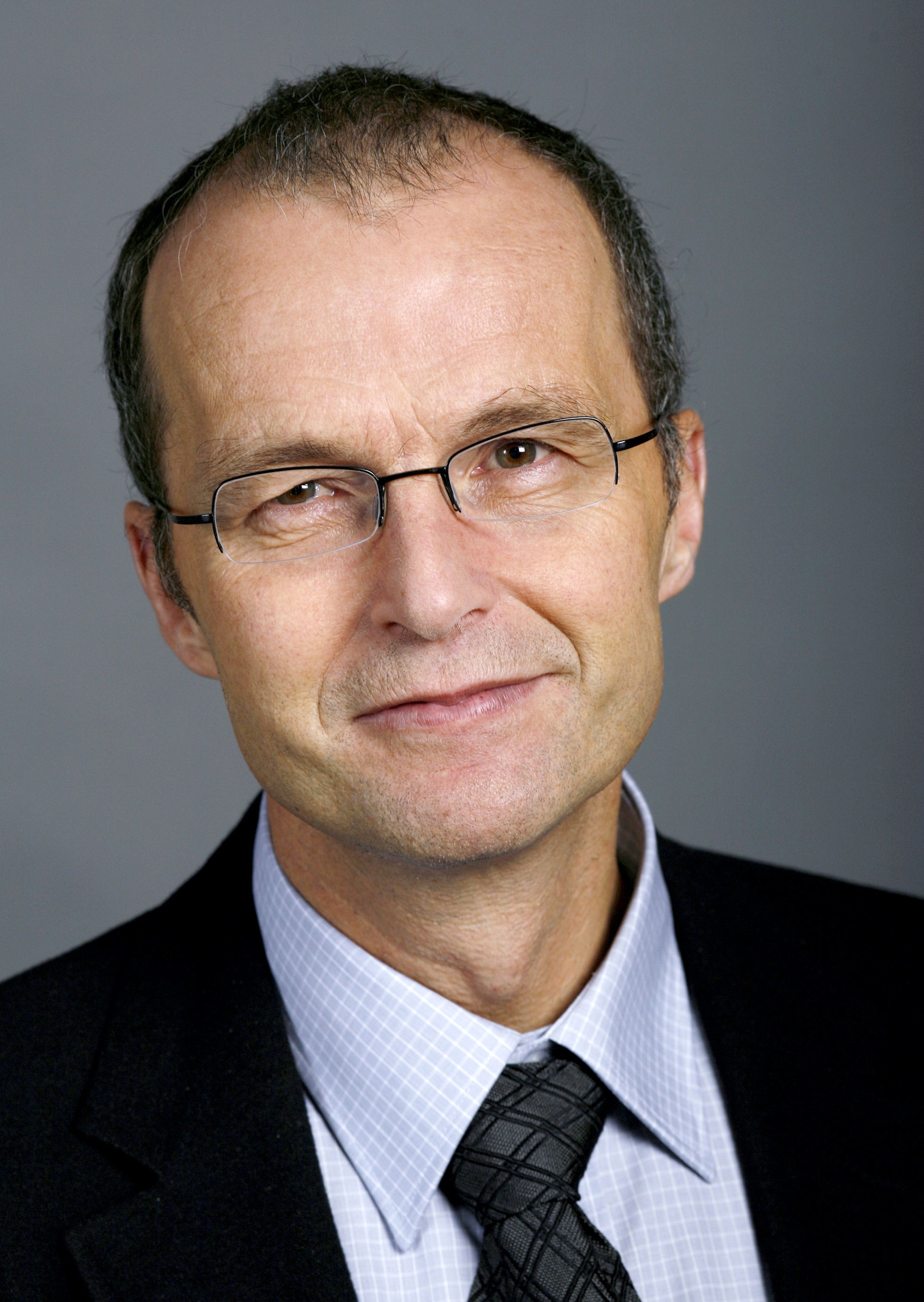
Werner Marti

Werner Marti (born 20 April 1957 in Glarus; Place of origin: Sool) is a Swiss lawyer and politician in the Social Democratic Party of Switzerland (SP). He was a member of the Swiss National Council from 1991 until the end of 2008.

== Biography ==
Werner Marti was a member of the municipal council of Sool and the Landrat of the Canton of Glarus from 1986 until 1990. From 1990 until 1998, he was a member of the Conseil d'État of Glarus. From 1996 until 2004, Marti worked as Preisüberwacher. In the SP leadership election of 2004, he was defeated by Hans-Jürg Fehr. From 25 November 1991, Werner Marti was a member of the Swiss National Council. He put himself forward as a candidate in the 10 February 2008 by-election for the seat on the Council of States which had been left vacant after the resignation of Fritz Schiesser, but he was defeated by Pankraz Freitag.

Marti resigned from the National Council at the end of 2008 and on 1 January 2009, he joined the executive council of AlpTransit Gotthard AG, of which he was elected president in spring 2009. On 18 December 2009, he was elected as the new president of the executive council of Billag, active from 1 January 2010.
