= Manfred Reichegger =

Italian ski mountaineer and runner (born 1977)

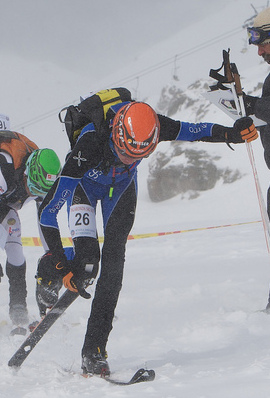

Personal information
- Nationality: Italian
- Born: 6 January 1977 (age 49) Brunico

Sport
- Country: Italy
- Sport: Ski mountaineering Skyrunning
Medal record
Ski mountaineering
Representing Italy
World Championships
Gold medal – first place	2006 World Championship	Relay
Gold medal – first place	2008 World Championship	Relay
Gold medal – first place	2010 World Championship	Relay
Gold medal – first place	2011 World Championship	Relay
Silver medal – second place	2011 World Championship	Team
Bronze medal – third place	2004 World Championship	Team
European Championships
Gold medal – first place	2003 European Championship	Single
Gold medal – first place	2005 European Championship	Relay
Gold medal – first place	2007 European Championship	Relay
Gold medal – first place	2009 European Championship	Relay
Gold medal – first place	2012 European Championship	Team
Silver medal – second place	2003 European Championship	Team
Silver medal – second place	2009 European Championship	Single
Bronze medal – third place	2009 European Championship	Team
Bronze medal – third place	2012 European Championship	Relay
Skyrunning
World Championships
Bronze medal – third place	2010 Canazei	Vertical Km
World Military Games
Gold medal – first place	2017 Sochi	Team
Silver medal – second place	2017 Sochi	Individual
Bronze medal – third place	2017 Sochi	Team race

Manfred Reichegger (born 6 January 1977) is an Italian ski mountaineer, sky runner and mountain runner.

== Biography ==
Reichegger was born in Bruneck. He competed first in ski mountaineering in 1999 and has been member of the national team since 2002. He also won the Mezzalama Skyrace in 2002.

== Selected results ==
- 2002:
  - 1st, Italian Cup team (together with Dennis Brunod)
  - 1st, Tour du Rutor (together with Dennis Brunod)
  - 2nd, Transcavallo (together with Dennis Brunod)
- 2003:
  - 1st, European Championship single race
  - 1st, European Championship combination ranking
  - 1st, Italian Cup team (together with Dennis Brunod)
  - 2nd, European Championship team racing (together with Dennis Brunod)
- 2004:
  - 1st, World Cup team
  - 1st, Dolomiti Cup team (together with Dennis Brunod)
  - 2nd, Transcavallo (together with Dennis Brunod)
  - 3rd, World Championship team racing (together with Dennis Brunod)
  - 4th, World Championship single race
  - 4th, World Championship combination ranking
- 2005:
  - 1st, European Championship relay race (together with Guido Giacomelli, Dennis Brunod and Matteo Pedergnana)
  - 1st, Italian Cup team (together with Dennis Brunod)
  - 1st, Trofeo "Rinaldo Maffeis" (together with Dennis Brunod)
  - 3rd, World Cup race, Salt Lake City
  - 5th, World Cup team (together with Dennis Brunod)
- 2006:
  - 1st, World Championship relay race (together with Hansjörg Lunger, Dennis Brunod and Guido Giacomelli)
  - 1st, World Cup team (together with Dennis Brunod)
  - 1st, Italian Cup
  - 1st, Trofeo "Rinaldo Maffeis" (together with Guido Giacomelli)
  - 1st, Tour du Rutor (together with Dennis Brunod)
- 2007:
  - 1st, European Championship relay race (together with Denis Trento, Dennis Brunod and Guido Giacomelli)
  - 1st, World Cup team
  - 1st, Tour du Rutor (together with Dennis Brunod)
  - 2nd, World Cup single
  - 2nd, Traça Catalana race
  - 4th, European Championship team race (together with Dennis Brunod)
  - 9th, European Championship combination ranking
- 2008:
  - 1st, World Championship relay race (together with Denis Trento, Dennis Brunod and Martin Riz)
  - 1st, Trofeo "Rinaldo Maffeis" (together with Dennis Brunod)
  - 5th, World Championship vertical race
  - 5th, World Championship combination ranking
  - 6th, World Cup race, Val d'Aran
  - 8th, World Championship single race
- 2009:
  - 1st, European Championship relay race (together with Lorenzo Holzknecht, Dennis Brunod and Damiano Lenzi)
  - 1st, Dachstein Xtreme
  - 2nd, European Championship single race
  - 2nd, European Championship combination ranking
  - 3rd, European Championship team race (together with Dennis Brunod)
  - 4th, European Championship vertical race
- 2010
  - 1st, World Championship relay race (together with Damiano Lenzi, Lorenzo Holzknecht and Dennis Brunod)
  - 4th, World Championship single race
  - 4th, World Championship vertical race
  - 5th, World Championship combination ranking
  - 6th, World Championship team race (together with Dennis Brunod)
  - 2nd, Trophée des Gastlosen (ISMF World Cup), together with Dennis Brunod
- 2011:
  - 1st, World Championship relay, together with Robert Antonioli, Denis Trento and Matteo Eydallin
  - 2nd, World Championship team race, together with Lorenzo Holzknecht
  - 5th, World Championship single race
  - 6th, World Championship vertical, combined ranking
- 2012:
  - 1st, European Championship team, together with Lorenzo Holzknecht
  - 3rd, European Championship relay, together with Matteo Eydallin, Damiano Lenzi and Robert Antonioli
  - 3rd, World Championship vertical, combined ranking
  - 4th, European Championship single
  - 4th, European Championship vertical race
  - 1st, 2012 Crested Butte Ski Mountaineering Race, sprint, single and total ranking

=== Trofeo Mezzalama ===
- 2003: 3rd, together with Dennis Brunod and Nicola Invernizzi
- 2005: 3rd, together with Jean Pellissier and Dennis Brunod
- 2007: 3rd, together with Dennis Brunod and Denis Trento
- 2009: 1st, together with Matteo Eydallin and Denis Trento

=== Pierra Menta ===
- 2004: 1st, together with Dennis Brunod
- 2009: 1st, together with Dennis Brunod
- 2010: 3rd, together with Dennis Brunod
- 2011: 5th, together with Damiano Lenzi
- 2012: 1st, together with Lorenzo Holzknecht

=== Patrouille des Glaciers ===
- 2010: 2nd, together with Matteo Eydallin and Pietro Lanfranchi
