= Victoria Kreuzer =

Swiss ski mountaineer and mountain runner (born 1989)

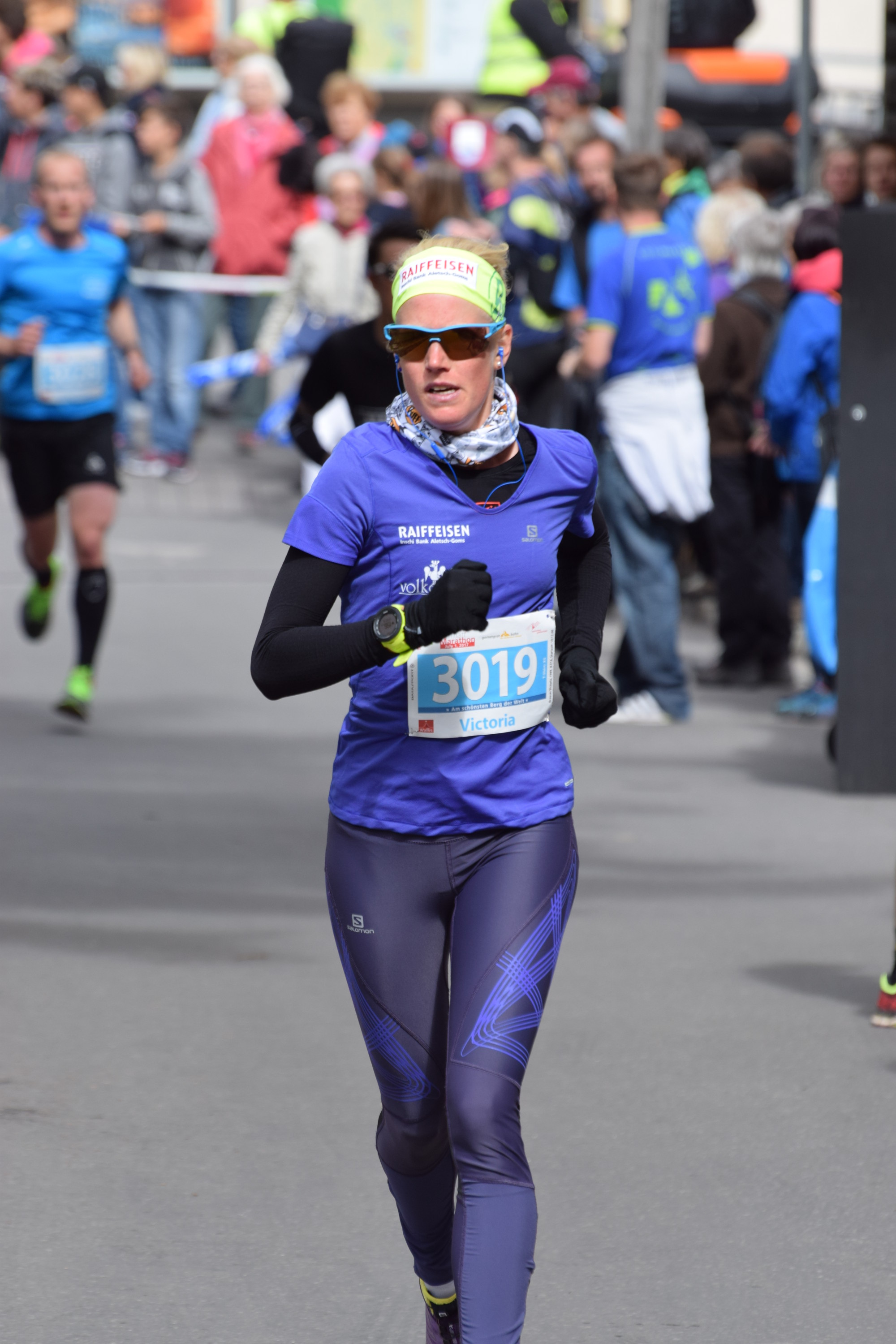

Personal information
- Born: 2 January 1989 (age 37)

Sport
- Sport: Skiing

Victoria Kreuzer (born 2 January 1989) from Fiesch is a Swiss ski mountaineer and mountain runner.

== Selected results ==
=== Ski mountaineering ===
- 2010:
  - 10th (and 2nd espoirs), World Championship, vertical race
  - 4th (espoirs), World Championship, individual
  - 1st, Zermatt-Rothorn run
  - 7th (and 1st in the espoirs ranking), Trophée des Gastlosen (ISMF World Cup), together with Mireille Richard
- 2011:
  - 2nd (espoirs), World Championship, vertical race
  - 9th (espoirs), World Championship, sprint
- 2012:
  - 1st, Zermatt-Rothorn run

=== Running ===
- 2006:
  - 3rd (juniors), Greifenseelauf, 21.1 km
- 2007:
  - 1st (juniors), Matterhorn run
  - 1st (juniors), Jeizibärg-Lauf / Valais Mountain Running Cup, Gampel
- 2008:
  - 1st (juniors), Matterhorn run
  - 1st (juniors), Jeizibärg-Lauf / Valais Mountain Running Championship
  - 2nd (juniors), Dérupe, Vercorin
  - 3rd (and 1st juniors ranking), Greifenseelauf, 10 km
- 2009:
  - 1st (F20), Matterhorn run
  - 1st, Jeizibärg-Lauf / Upper Valais Running Cup / Valais Mountain Running Cup
- 2010:
  - 1st (F20), Matterhorn run
  - 1st, Jeizibärg-Lauf / Mountain Running Cup
  - 1st (women I), Hohsaas mountain run
- 2011:
  - 2nd (F20), Matterhorn run
  - 3rd (women I), Täschalplauf / Upper Valais Running Cup, Täsch
