= Angelo Genuin =

Italian ski mountaineer and cross-country skier

Personal information
- Born: 21 October 1939 (age 86) Falcade, Italy

Sport
- Sport: Skiing
Medal record
ski mountaineering
Gold medal – first place	1975 World Championship (Trofeo Mezzalama)	military team

Angelo Genuin (born 21 October 1939) is a former Italian ski mountaineer and cross-country skier. He was born in Falcade.

Genuin started his competition career in 1957, at the age of 18 years. In the 1959/60-season he had his first successes in the senior class, and he became a member of the national B-team. In the 1961/62-season he entered the A-team. He participated in the 1964 Winter Olympics and finished 24th in the 50 kilometres cross-country skiing event.

Together with Bruno Bonaldi and Luigi Weiss, he placed first in the military team category in the 1975 Trofeo Mezzalama edition, which was carried out as the first World Championship of Skimountaineering.

Further notable results were:

- 1952: 3rd, Italian men's championships of cross-country skiing, 15 km
- 1967: 2nd, Italian men's championships of cross-country skiing, 15 km
