= Axelle Mollaret =

French ski mountaineer (born 1992)

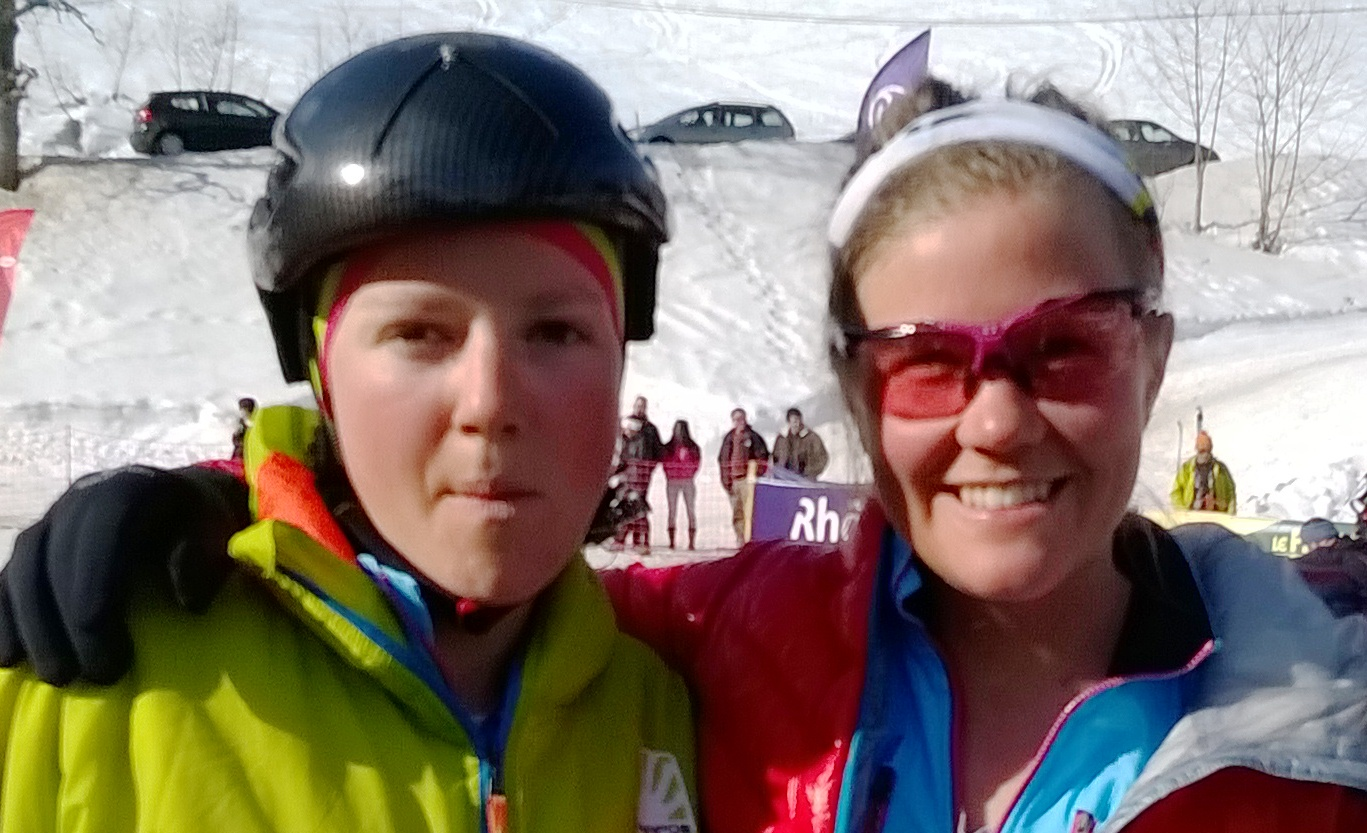
Axelle Mollaret and Emelie Forsberg after winning the first stage of the 2015 Pierra Menta race in France

Axelle Mollaret (born 3 September 1992 in Annecy, Haute-Savoie) is a French skyrunner and ski mountaineer.

== Biography ==
She is physiotherapist. She has been member of the Ski Mountaineering French national selection since 2013. In 2015 she won the biennial Trofeo Mezzalama with teammates Emelie Forsberg and Jennifer Fiechter.

== Selected results ==
- Pierra Menta
  - 2013 : (silver) with ITA Elena Nicolini
  - 2014 : (silver) with SUI Émilie Gex-Fabry
  - 2015 : (silver) with SWE Emelie Forsberg
  - 2016 : (gold) Winner with Laetitia Roux
  - 2017 : (bronze) with Lorna Bonnel
  - 2018 : (gold) Winner with ITA Katia Tomatis
