= Jennifer Fiechter =

Swiss ski mountaineer (born 1992)

Jennifer Fiechter, born 7 May 1992, is a Swiss ski mountaineer who in 2015 won the biennial Trofeo Mezzalama with teammates Emelie Forsberg and Axelle Mollaret. Two years later she repeated her Trofeo Mezzalama victory, this time with teammates Emelie Forsberg and Laetitia Roux.
