= Marianne Fatton =

Swiss ski mountaineer (born 1995)

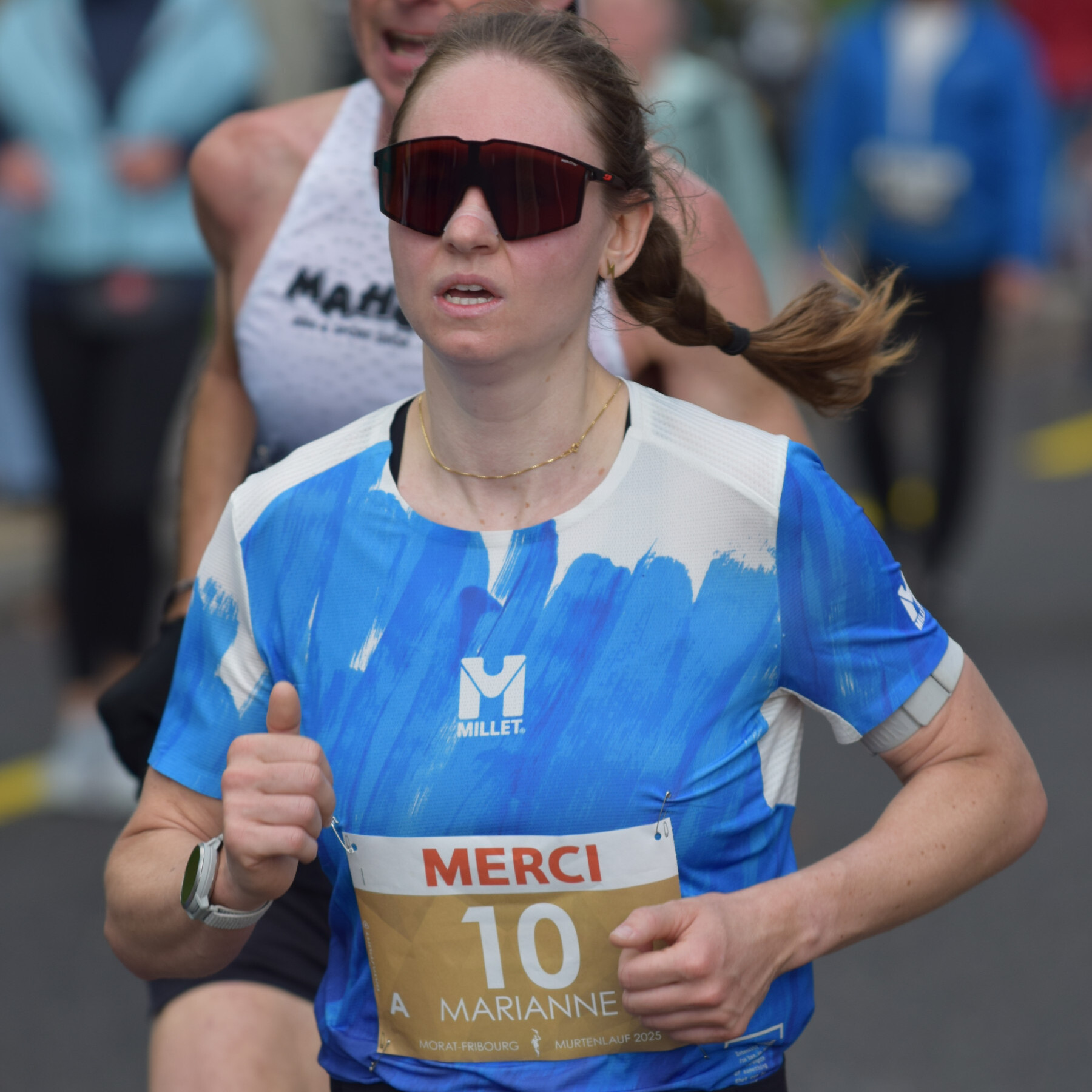
- Fatton in 2025

Personal information
- Born: 16 December 1995 (age 30) Neuchâtel, Switzerland
- Height: 1.69 m (5 ft 7 in)
- Weight: 60 kg (132 lb)

Sport
- Country: Switzerland
- Sport: Ski mountaineering
Medal record
Women's ski mountaineering
Representing Switzerland
Olympic Games
Gold medal – first place	2026 Milano Cortina	Sprint
Silver medal – second place	2026 Milano Cortina	Mixed relay
World Championships
Gold medal – first place	2021 Comapedrosa	Sprint race
Gold medal – first place	2025 Morgins	Sprint race
Silver medal – second place	2023 Boí Taüll	Sprint race
Bronze medal – third place	2017 Tambre	Sprint race
Bronze medal – third place	2019 Villars-sur-Ollon	Team race
Bronze medal – third place	2019 Villars-sur-Ollon	Mixed relay
Bronze medal – third place	2021 Comapedrosa	Mixed relay
Bronze medal – third place	2025 Morgins	Mixed relay
European Championships
Gold medal – first place	2024 Flaine / Chamonix	Sprint
Bronze medal – third place	2024 Flaine / Chamonix	Mixed relay

Marianne Fatton (born 16 December 1995) is a Swiss ski mountaineer. She represented Switzerland at the 2026 Winter Olympics, and won a gold medal in the sprint race.

== Career ==
Fatton competed at the 2023 World Championship of Ski Mountaineering and won a silver medal in the sprint race with a time of 3:14.005.

In March 2025, she competed at the 2025 World Championship of Ski Mountaineering and won a gold medal in the sprint race, with a time of 3:20.96. With the win, she earned a quota spot for the discipline at the 2026 Winter Olympics. She also won a bronze medal in the mixed relay, along with Robin Bussard, with a time of 33:02.9.

On 19 February 2026, Fatton won the first-ever Olympic gold medal in ski mountaineering, finishing in first place in the sprint race with a time of 2:59.77. On 21 February 2026, she won a silver medal in the mixed relay, along with Jon Kistler, with a time of 27:09.30.

== Personal life ==
Fatton's mother, Anna Janoušková, is a former Olympic cross-country skier who competed at the 1992 Winter Olympics.
