= Denis Trento =

Italian ski mountaineer (1982–2024)

Personal information
- Nationality: Italy
- Born: 2 June 1982 Aosta, Italy
- Died: 3 May 2024 (aged 41) La Salle, Aosta Valley, Italy

Sport
- Sport: Skiing
Medal record
Ski mountaineering
Representing Italy
World Championships
Gold medal – first place	2008 Champery	Relay
Gold medal – first place	2011 Claut	Team
Gold medal – first place	2011 Claut	Relay
European Championships
Gold medal – first place	2007 Avoriaz	Relay
Gold medal – first place	2009 Avoriaz	Team

Denis Trento (2 June 1982 – 3 May 2024) was an Italian ski mountaineer and mountain guide.

== Career ==
He was known for his wins at some of Europe's top mountaineering competitions, including the Adamello in 2008, the Tour du Rutor in 2009 and 2011, and the European team championship and Mezzalama Trophy in 2009. He began competing in ski mountaineering as an athlete at the Army Sports Center in Courmayeur, as a member of the Centro Sportivo Esercito.

After retiring from competition, in 2015 he became a mountain guide. He continued mountaineering, putting up speed ascents across the Aosta Valley, and beyond, including the Grandes Jorasses, Monte Rosa, Mont Blanc's Innominata ridge, and Mount Brouillard.

In 2020, alongside speed climber Filip Babicz, he climbed the Frêney pillar of Mont Blanc in a round trip ascent and descent in less than 24 hours.

== Accident ==
Trento died as the result of a fall on the north face of Mount Paramont in La Salle, on 3 May 2024, at the age of 41. The cause of the fall was unknown, but as he was wearing crampons, it was theorized he was traversing a difficult passage at the time of the accident.

== Selected results ==
- 2006:
  - 8th, World Championship vertical race
- 2007:
  - 1st, European Championship relay race (together with Dennis Brunod, Manfred Reichegger and Guido Giacomelli)
- 2008:
  - 1st, World Championship relay race (together with Dennis Brunod, Manfred Reichegger and Martin Riz)
- 2009:
  - 1st, European Championship team race (together with Matteo Eydallin)
  - 1st, Tour du Rutor (together with Matteo Eydallin)
  - 1st, Trofeo "Rinaldo Maffeis" (together with Matteo Eydallin)
  - 2nd, Dachstein Xtreme
  - 9th, European Championship single race
- 2010:
  - 1st, Trophée des Gastlosen (ISMF World Cup), together with Guido Giacomelli
- 2011:
  - 1st, World Championship team race, together with Matteo Eydallin
  - 1st, World Championship relay, together with Manfred Reichegger, Robert Antonioli and Matteo Eydallin
  - 5th, World Championship vertical, total ranking
  - 6th, World Championship single race
  - 1st, Tour du Rutor (together with Matteo Eydallin)
- 2012:
  - 6th, European Championship team, together with Matteo Eydallin
  - 1st, Rollandoz Trophy
- 2022
  - 1st, Morgex K1000 vertical race

=== Pierra Menta ===
- 2006: 4th, together with Tony Sbalbi
- 2007: 5th, together with Tony Sbalbi
- 2009: 2nd, together with Matteo Eydallin
- 2011: 3rd, together with Matteo Eydallin
- 2012: 2nd, together with Matteo Eydallin

=== Trofeo Mezzalama ===
- 2005: 6th, together with Nicola Invernizzi and Alain Seletto
- 2007: 3rd, together with Manfred Reichegger and Dennis Brunod
- 2009: 1st, together with Manfred Reichegger and Matteo Eydallin
