= Francesco Vida =

Italian military officer and skier

Personal information
- Born: 11 September 1903 Gorizia, Austria-Hungary
- Died: 1 June 1985 (aged 81) East London, South Africa

Sport
- Sport: Skiing

Francesco Vida (11 September 1903 – 1 June 1985) was an Italian military officer and skier.

== Biography ==
Vida, born in Gorizia, joined the Bersaglieri corps of the Italian army in 1923. From 1925 to 1929 he attended the Military Academy of Modena, before he joined the Alpini corps, where he became skiing instructor in 1931 and in 1934 one of 92 military academic mountaineers (alpinista accademico militare) of the Scuola Militare di Alpinismo (SCMA; today: Centro Addestramento Alpino) in Aosta. In 1935, Lieutenant (Tenente) Vida, Ettore Schranz and Carlo Invernizzi placed second at the 3rd Trofeo Mezzalama competition. Vida, Ettore Schranz and Angelo Bonora formed the reserve military patrol team at the 1936 Winter Olympics, where the Italian competition team placed first. During the closing ceremony of the event he was the standard-bearer of the Italian representation. At the fourth edition of the Trofeo Mezzalama in 1936, Vida, Sergeant Carlo Ronc and Sergeant Luigi Perenni, his team placed first. Later he became commander of the SCMA in the rank of a lieutenant colonel. Later he was advanced to general.

He died in East London, Eastern Cape, South Africa.

== Publications ==
- Francesco Vida, La storia dello sci in Italia (1896-1975), Milano Sole, 1976

== Awards ==
- International Emilio and Aldo De Martino Prize, 1972
