= Francesca Martinelli =

Italian ski mountaineer (born 1971)

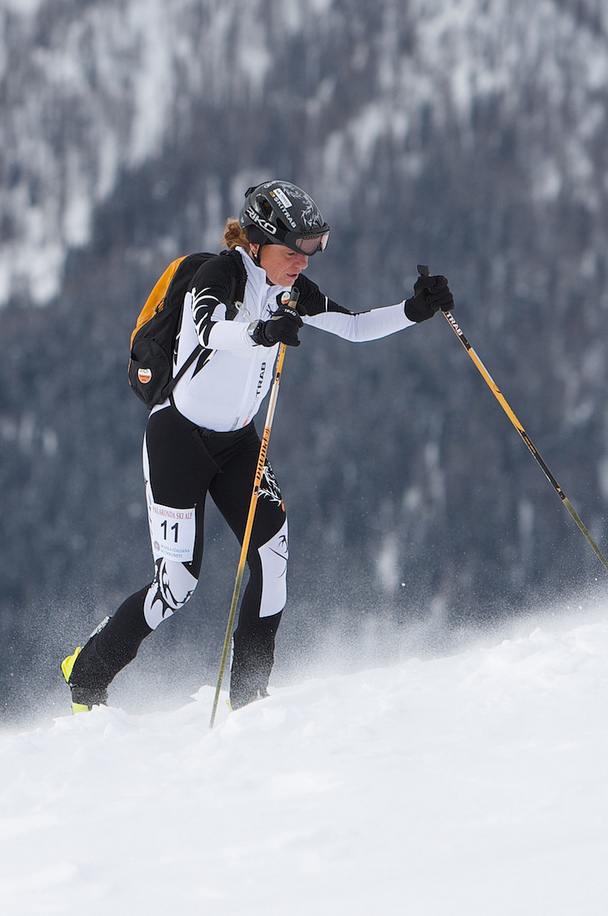
- Martinelli at the 2010 Palaronda SkiAlp

Personal information
- Born: 13 March 1971 (age 55) Milan, Italy

Sport
- Sport: Skiing
- Club: Sci Club Alta Valtellina
Medal record
Ski mountaineering
Representing Italy
World Championships
Gold medal – first place	2004 World Championship	Team
Gold medal – first place	2006 World Championship	Team
Gold medal – first place	2006 World Championship	Relay
Gold medal – first place	2008 World Championship	Long distance
Gold medal – first place	2008 World Championship	Team
Gold medal – first place	2010 World Championship	Team
Gold medal – first place	2010 World Championship	Relay
Silver medal – second place	2008 World Championship	Vertical race
Silver medal – second place	2008 World Championship	Relay
Silver medal – second place	2011 World Championship	Team
Bronze medal – third place	2008 World Championship	Single
Bronze medal – third place	2010 World Championship	Vertical race
Bronze medal – third place	2010 World Championship	Single
European Championships
Gold medal – first place	2007 European Championship	Team
Gold medal – first place	2007 European Championship	Relay
Gold medal – first place	2009 European Championship	Team
Gold medal – first place	2009 European Championship	Relay
Silver medal – second place	2005 European Championship	Relay
Silver medal – second place	2009 European Championship	Single
Bronze medal – third place	2009 European Championship	Vertical race

Francesca Martinelli (born 13 March 1971) is an Italian ski mountaineer.

Martinelli was born in Milan. She started ski mountaineering in 1980 and competed first in the Gara dell'Adamello race in 2003. Two years after she became a member of the Italian national team.

== Selected results ==
- 2004:
  - 1st, World Championship team race (together with Cristina Favre-Moretti)
  - 2nd, Sellaronda Skimarathon (together with Roberta Pedranzini)
- 2005:
  - 2nd, European Championship relay race (together with Gloriana Pellissier and Christiane Nex)
  - 6th, European Championship vertical race
  - 6th, European Championship single race
  - 7th, European Championship team race (together with Astrid Renzler)
- 2006:
  - 1st, World Championship team race (together with Roberta Pedranzini)
  - 1st, World Championship relay race (together with Chiara Raso, Roberta Pedranzini and Gloriana Pellissier)
  - 1st, Tour du Rutor (together with Roberta Pedranzini)
- 2007:
  - 1st, European Championship team race (together with Roberta Pedranzini)
  - 1st, European Championship relay race (together with Gloriana Pellissier and Roberta Pedranzini)
  - 1st, Mountain Attack race
  - 1st, Sellaronda Skimarathon (together with Roberta Pedranzini)
  - 2nd, European Championship combination ranking
  - 4th, European Championship single race
  - 9th, European Championship vertical race
- 2008:
  - 1st, World Championship long distance race
  - 1st, World Championship team race (together with Roberta Pedranzini)
  - 1st, Mountain Attack race
  - 1st, Dolomiti Cup team (together with Roberta Pedranzini)
  - 2nd, World Championship vertical race
  - 2nd, World Championship combination ranking
  - 2nd, World Championship relay race (together with Gloriana Pellissier, Roberta Pedranzini and Elisa Fleischmann)
  - 3rd, World Championship single race
- 2009:
  - 1st, European Championship team race (together with Roberta Pedranzini)
  - 1st, European Championship relay race (together with Gloriana Pellissier and Roberta Pedranzini)
  - 1st, Tour du Rutor (together with Roberta Pedranzini)
  - 1st, Mountain Attack race
  - 2nd, European Championship single race
  - 2nd, European Championship combination ranking
  - 3rd, European Championship vertical race
  - 3rd, Dachstein Xtreme
- 2010:
  - 1st, World Championship relay race (together with Silvia Rocca and Roberta Pedranzini)
  - 1st, World Championship team race (together with Roberta Pedranzini)
  - 2nd, World Championship combination ranking
  - 3rd, World Championship vertical race
  - 3rd, World Championship single race
- 2011:
  - 2nd, World Championship team race (together with Roberta Pedranzini)
  - 1st and course record, Sellaronda Skimarathon (together with Roberta Pedranzini)

=== Pierra Menta ===
- 2006: 1st, together with Roberta Pedranzini
- 2007: 1st, together with Roberta Pedranzini
- 2008: 2nd, together with Roberta Pedranzini
- 2009: 1st, together with Roberta Pedranzini
- 2010: 1st, together with Roberta Pedranzini
- 2011: 2nd, together with Roberta Pedranzini
- 2012: 1st, together with Roberta Pedranzini

=== Trofeo Mezzalama ===
- 2007: 1st, together with Gloriana Pellissier and Roberta Pedranzini
- 2009: 1st, together with Laëtitia Roux and Roberta Pedranzini
- 2011: 1st, together with Roberta Pedranzini and Gloriana Pellissier

=== Patrouille des Glaciers ===
- 2010: 2nd, together with Roberta Pedranzini and Silvia Rocca
