= Michele Boscacci =

Italian ski mountaineer (born 1990)

Personal information
- Nationality: Italy
- Born: 4 January 1990 (age 36) Sondalo, Lombardy, Italy

Sport
- Sport: Skiing
- Club: Polisportiva Albosaggia

Michele Boscacci (born 4 January 1990) is an Italian ski mountaineer.

== Early life ==
Boscacci was born Sondalo, and started skiing when he was five years old. His father, Graziano Boscacci, is a former ski mountaineer. Boscacci,

== Career ==
In 2004 he competed at his first Pierra Menta race, when he was fourteen years old. A few years later he became a member of the national youth team.

He is a member of the Polisportiva Albosaggia.

== Personal life ==
Boscacci married fellow ski mountaineer Alba De Silvestro on 18 September 2021.

== Selected results ==
- 2010:
  - 1st (juniors), Trophée des Gastlosen (ISMF World Cup), together with Robert Antonioli
- 2011:
  - 8th, World Championship single race
  - 3rd, Trofeo Mezzalama, together with Marc Pinsach Rubirola and Robert Antonioli
  - 9th, Pierra Menta, together with Robert Antonioli
- 2012:
  - 4th, European Championship team, together with Damiano Lenzi
  - 1st, Sellaronda Skimarathon, together with Lorenzo Holzknecht
  - 2nd, Mountain Attack
- Season 2012–2013:
  - Italian vertical U23 championship 1st, overall 1st
  - U23 individual Italian championship 2nd, overall 8th
  - U23 World Cup final ranking 2nd, overall 10th
  - Italian U23 pairs championship 1st
  - World Relay Championship, overall 2nd
  - U23 vertical world championship 2nd, overall 8th
  - U23 Individual World Championship 3rd, overall 9th
  - Pierramenta U23 1st, overall 6th
  - Adamello ski ride, overall 3rd
  - Mezzalama Trophy, overall 3rd
