= Osvaldo Ronc =

Italian ski mountaineer (born 1947)

Personal information
- Born: 16 November 1947 (age 78)

Sport
- Sport: Skiing
Medal record
ski mountaineering
| Gold medal – first place | 1975 World Championship (Trofeo Mezzalama) | civilian team |

Osvaldo Ronc (born 16 November 1947) is an Italian ski mountaineer.

Together with Renzo Meynet and Mirko Stangalino, he placed first in the civilian team category in the 1975 Trofeo Mezzalama edition, which was carried out as the first World Championship of Skimountaineering.
