= Oreste Squinobal =

Medal record

ski mountaineering
Gold medal – first place	1975 World Championship (Trofeo Mezzalama)	mountain guides team

Oreste Squinobal (17 December 1942 – 9 September 2004), from Gressoney-Saint-Jean, was an Italian mountain climber, mountain guide of Monte Rosa and ski mountaineer.

Together with his brother Arturo he made his first winter ascent of the South Face of Matterhorn (23 December 1971), the first winter ascent of the Peuterey Integral (26 December 1972, together with Yannick Seigneur, Michel Feuillarade, Marc Galy, and Louis Audoubert), and the first winter ascent of the West Face of Matterhorn (11 January 1978, together with Rolando Albertini, Marco Barmasse, Innocenzo Menabreaz, Leo Pession, Augusto Tamone).

Together with his brothers Arturo and Lorenzo, he placed first in the mountain guides team category in the 1975 Trofeo Mezzalama edition, which was carried out as the first World Championship of Skimountaineering.

On May 2, 1982, he was the first Italian to climb to the summit of the Kangchenjunga (8,586 meters) without supplemental oxygen.

Oreste and Arturo Squinobal's story is told in Brothers of the Mountains.

The mountain hut Orestes Hütte is dedicated to his memory and run by his nephews.
