= Roberto Stella =

Italian physician (1952–2020)

- Born: July 22, 1952; Busto Arsizio, Lombardy, Italy
- Died: March 11, 2020 (aged 67); Como, Lombardy, Italy
- Cause of death: COVID-19
- Education: University of Milan (MD)
- Occupation: General practitioner

Roberto Stella (22 July 1952 – 11 March 2020) was an Italian physician who worked as a general practitioner in Busto Arsizio. He held numerous positions in national medical associations, including serving as president of the Italian Scientific Society for Continuing Medical Education of General Practitioners and the National Interdisciplinary Medical Society of Primary Care.

== Early life and education ==
Roberto Stella was born in Busto Arsizio on 22 July 1952. Stella earned a doctor of medicine and surgery from University of Milan in 1978. He served in the Alpini and was a volunteer Alpino medic during the 1980 Irpinia earthquake. Stella specialized in general hematology in Pavia in 1984.

== Career ==
Stella ran a medical clinic in Busto Arsizio. In 2017, Stella was elected to a fourth three-year term as president of the Medical Guild of Varese. Stella is recognized as having trained "a generation of family practitioners in Lombardy."

Stella was active in national medical associations. He held elected positions in the National Federation of the Orders of Doctors and Dental Surgeons for almost 30 years, most recently as the national training manager. He served as president of the Italian Scientific Society for Continuing Medical Education of General Practitioners.

He was president of the National Interdisciplinary Medical Society of Primary Care (SNaMID).

Stella's last peer-reviewed publication was published posthumously on March 16, 2020. It detailed an e-learning course he prepared about COVID-19 open to all Italian physicians. Over 35,000 participants signed up for the course.

== Personal life ==
Stella resided in Busto Arsizio. He was married to Daniela. He had two sons, one of whom is a medical student set to graduate in 2020.

=== Death ===
In 2020, Stella and another physician at his medical practice tested positive for COVID-19. News of their diagnosis sparked panic in the community, prompting mayor Emanuele Antonelli to issue a statement. Stella died in Como on 11 March 2020, after being hospitalized for respiratory failure due to COVID-19. He had been treating patients with the virus contracting it himself. Stella is the first known Italian physician to die from the virus. Health Minister Roberto Speranza remarked that the Italian health system lost a "point of reference." Stella's eulogy was broadcast on national television during the nightly pandemic updates from the Protezione Civile.
