= World Championships of Ski Mountaineering =

Ski mountaineering competitions

The World Championships of Ski Mountaineering are biannually held ski mountaineering competitions.

== History ==
The events were originally sanctioned by the International Council for Ski Mountaineering Competitions (ISMC). The first official world mastership of the ISMC was carried out in the "International Year of Mountains" (2002), declared by the United Nations. The championship was held in Serre Chevalier, France, from January 24 to January 27, 2002. Prior the Italian Trofeo Mezzalama was held as "World Championship of Ski Mountaineering" with the classes "Civilians", "Soldiers" and "Mountain guides" in 1975. Because the ISMC merged into the International Ski Mountaineering Federation (ISMF) in 2008, the next championships were sanctioned by the ISMF. In 2011, the originally planned 9th edition of the European Championships of Ski Mountaineering at last was held as 6th edition of the World Championships.

Medalist teams of the 1975 Trofeo Mezzalama
"civilian teams"	Gold	(Italy) Renzo Meynet	(Italy) Osvaldo Ronc	(Italy) Mirko Stangalino
"civilian teams"	Silver			
"civilian teams"	Bronze			
"military teams"	Gold	(Italy) Angelo Genuin	(Italy) Bruno Bonaldi	(Italy) Luigi "Gigi" Weiss
"military teams"	Silver	(Italy) Gianfranco Stella	(Italy) Aldo Stella	(Italy) Leo Vidi
"military teams"	Bronze	(Italy) Willy Bertin	(Italy) Felice Darioli	(Italy) Fabrizio Pedranzini
"mountain guides"	Gold	(Italy) Oreste Squinobal	(Italy) Arturo Squinobal	(Italy) Lorenzo Squinobal
"mountain guides"	Silver			
"mountain guides"	Bronze			

Further venues of the ISMC World Championships were the Aran Valley (Spain) in 2004, the Italian Province of Cuneo in 2006, and Portes du Soleil (Switzerland) in 2008. The World Championships are supported by the national organizations of the carrying out countries.

== Ratings ==
The disciplines are rated by gender and age groups. In 2002, only individual and team (2 racers) races were held and rated, added with a combined ranking. At the 2004 championship a relay event and a vertical race competition were added. The men's relay teams were of four racers and the women's teams of three. In the following years all relay teams were of four ski mountaineers. In 2006 the relay race was canceled because of bad snow conditions, and consequently there was no combined ranking. At the 2008 World Masterships a long-distance race was added.

The national squads are often mixed with up an coming athletes of the "Espoirs"-level. Some nations do not have squads with enough racers for all disciplines.

== Medalist nations and disciplines ==
(by point-awarding system)

year	venue	1.	2.	3.	disciplines					
year	venue	1.	2.	3.	individual	team	combination	relay	vertical race	long distance
1st 2002	Serre Chevalier, FRA	FRA	ITA	SUI	X	X	X	–	–	–
2nd 2004	Aran Valley, ESP	SUI	ITA	FRA	X	X	X	X	X	–
3rd 2006	Province of Cuneo, ITA	ITA	SUI	FRA	–	X	–	X	X	–
4th 2008	Champery, Portes du Soleil, SUI	ITA	FRA	SUI	X	X	X	X	X	X
5th 2010	Gran Valira, AND	ITA	FRA	SUI	X	X	X	X	X	–
6th 2011	Claut, ITA	FRA	SUI	ITA	X	X	X	X	X	–
7th 2013	Puy-Saint-Vincent, Pelvoux, FRA	ITA	FRA	SUI	X	X	X	X	X	–
8th 2015	Verbier, SUI	ITA	FRA	SUI	X	X	X	X	X	–
9th 2017	Tambre - Piancavallo, ITA	ITA	SUI	FRA	X	X	X	X	X	–
10th 2019	Villars-sur-Ollon, SUI	SUI	ITA	FRA	X	X	X	X	X	–
11th 2021	Comapedrosa La Massana, AND	ITA	SUI	FRA	X	X	X	X	X	–
12th 2023	Boí Taüll, ESP	FRA	SUI	ITA	X	X	–	X	X	–
13th 2025	Morgins, SUI	SUI	FRA	CHN	X	X	–	X	X	–

== See also ==
- ISMF Ski Mountaineering World Cup
