= 2004 Skyrunner World Series =

- Overall: (Spain) Agustí Roc Amador (Spain) Anna Serra

Competitions
- Venues: 7 venues
- Individual: 7 events

The 2004 Skyrunner World Series was the 3rd edition of the global skyrunning competition, Skyrunner World Series, organised by the International Skyrunning Federation from 2002.

== Results ==
The World Cup has developed in 7 races from May to October.

Race	Country	Date	Men's winner	Women's winner
Maratòn Alpina Zegama-Aizkorri	Spain	23 May	(Italy) Mario Poletti	(Spain) Anna Serra
Valmalenco-Valposchiavo	Switzerland	13 June	(Italy) Dennis Brunod	(Italy) Emanuela Brizio
Sentiero 4 Luglio SkyRace	Italy	4 July	(Italy) Fabio Bonfanti	(Italy) Emanuela Brizio
6000D SkyRace	France	25 July	(United Kingdom) Rob Jebb	(France) Corinne Favre
Dolomites SkyRace	Italy	1 August	(Italy) Fulvio Dapit	(Spain) Anna Serra
Pikes Peak Marathon	United States	22 August	(United States) Galen Burrell	(United States) Erica Larson
Mount Kinabalu Climbathon	Malaysia	3 October	(Italy) Bruno Brunod	(Czech Republic) Anna Pichrtová
Champions			(Spain) Agustí Roc Amador	(Spain) Anna Serra
