= 2006 Skyrunner World Series =

- Overall: (Mexico) Ricardo Mejía (United Kingdom) Angela Mudge

Competitions
- Venues: 8 venues
- Individual: 8 events

The 2006 Skyrunner World Series was the 5th edition of the global skyrunning competition, Skyrunner World Series, organised by the International Skyrunning Federation from 2002.

== Results ==
The World Cup has developed in 8 races from May to September.

Race	Date	Men's winner	Women's winner
UltraTrail de Mexico (UTMX), Hidalgo, Mexico	May 7	Ricardo Mejía	Monica Ardid
Maratòn Alpina Zegama-Aizkorri, Spain	May 28	Ricardo Mejía	Angela Mudge
Valmalenco-Valposchiavo, Italy / Switzerland	June 11	Helmut Schiessl	Angela Mudge
OSJ Ontake SkyRace, Japan	June 25	Fulvio Dapit	Angela Mudge
Dolomites SkyRace, Italy	July 23	Agustí Roc Amador	Angela Mudge
SkyRace Andorra, Vallnord	September 3	Ricardo Mejía	Ester Hernandez Casahuga
Sentiero delle Grigne, Italy	September 17	Massimo Colombo	Daniela Gilardi
Mount Kinabalu Climbathon, Malaysia	September 30	Ricardo Mejía	Anna Pichrtová
2006 champions		Ricardo Mejía	Angela Mudge

== Final rankings ==
Men
1st (Mexico) Ricardo Mejía - 400 points
2nd (Spain) Agusti Roc - 342 points
3rd (Italy) Fulvio Dapit - 322 points

Women
1st (United Kingdom) Angela Mudge - 456 points
2nd (France) Corinne Favre - 408 points
3rd (Spain) Ester Hernández - 394 points
