= 2014 Skyrunner World Series =

Winners
- SkyRace: (Spain) Kílian Jornet (United States) Stevie Kremer
- Sky Ultra: (Spain) Kílian Jornet (Sweden) Emelie Forsberg
- Vertical Kilometer: (Spain) Kílian Jornet (Spain) Laura Orgué

Competitions
- Venues: 10 venues
- Individual: 15 events

The 2014 Skyrunner World Series was the 13th edition of the global skyrunning competition, Skyrunner World Series, organised by the International Skyrunning Federation from 2002.

It was based on the same format as the season of 2013.

== Results ==
=== Category Sky ===
Bonus races (20% extra points)

Race	Date	Men's winner	Women's winner
Maratòn Alpina Zegama-Aizkorri (Spain)	May 25	Kílian Jornet Burgada	Stevie Kremer
Dolomites SkyRace (Italy)	July 20	Kílian Jornet Burgada	Laura Orgué
Sierre-Zinal (Switzerland)	August 10	Kílian Jornet Burgada	Stevie Kremer
Matterhorn Ultraks (Switzerland)	August 23	Zaid Ait Malek	Stevie Kremer
Limone Extreme (Italy)	October 11	Petro Mamu	Maite Maiora Elizondo
2014 SkyRace champions		Kílian Jornet Burgada (2)	Stevie Kremer (2)

=== Category Ultra ===
Bonus races (20% extra points)

Race	Date	Men's winner	Women's winner
Transvulcania (Spain)	May 10	Luis Alberto Hernando	Anna Frost
Ice Trail Tarentaise (France)	July 13	François D'Haene	Emelie Forsberg
Speedgoat (USA)	July 19	Sage Canaday	Anna Frost
Kima Trophy (Italy)	August 31	Kílian Jornet Burgada	Kasie Enman
The Rut 50K (USA)	September 11	Kílian Jornet Burgada	Emelie Forsberg
2014 Ultra champions		Kílian Jornet Burgada (2)	Emelie Forsberg (2)

=== Category Vertical ===
Bonus races (20% extra points)

Race	Date	Men's winner	Women's winner
Transvulcania Vertical (Spain)	May 8	Bernard Dematteis	Elisa Desco
Val d'Isère Vertical (France)	July 11	Marco Moletto	Christel Dewalle
Dolomites Vertical (Italy)	July 18	Urban Zemmer	Laura Orgué
Lone Peak Vertical (USA)	September 12	Kílian Jornet Burgada	Stéphanie Jiménez
Limone Vertical (Italy)	October 10	Kílian Jornet Burgada	Laura Orgué
2014 VK champions		Kílian Jornet Burgada	Laura Orgué (2)
