= 2011 Skyrunner World Series =

- Overall: (Spain) Luis-Alberto Hernando (Spain) Oihana Kortazar Aranzeta

Competitions
- Venues: 14 venues
- Individual: 14 events

The 2011 Skyrunner World Series was the 10th edition of the global skyrunning competition, Skyrunner World Series, organised by the International Skyrunning Federation from 2002.

Same format of the seasons 2008, 2009 and 2010.

== Results ==
The World Cup has developed in 14 races from May to September.

Race of Skyrunner World Series
Race of Skyrunner World Series Trails

#	Race	Country	Date	Men's winner	Women's winner
1	Kilomètre Vertical Arles/Tech	France	May 8	Marco De Gasperi	Mireia Miró Varela
2	Maratòn Alpina Zegama-Aizkorri	Spain	May 29	Kílian Jornet Burgada	Oihana Kortazar Aranzeta
3	Ziria Skyrace	Greece	May 29	Alexandros Kampouropoulos	Amalia Mathaiou
4	Travessa de Canillo	Andorra	June 26	Luis Alberto Hernando	Laura Orgué
5	SkyMarathon Ribagorza Románica	Spain	July 3	Luis Alberto Hernando	Oihana Kortazar Aranzeta
6	Bettelmatt Ultra Trail	Italy	July 17	Mikhail Mamleev	Emanuela Brizio
7	Snowdon Race	United Kingdom	July 23	Andi Jones	Pippa Maddams
8	Dolomites SkyRace	Italy	July 24	Luis Alberto Hernando	Mireia Miró Varela
9	Sierre-Zinal	Switzerland	August 14	Marco De Gasperi	Oihana Kortazar Aranzeta
10	Pikes Peak Marathon	United States	August 20	Mario Macias	Kim S. Dobson
11	Marathon du Montcalm	France	August 20	Michel Rabat	Stéphanie Jiménez
12	OSJ Ontake SkyRace	Japan	August 28	Dai Matsumoto	Hasegawa Kanako
13	Sorginen Lasterketa	Spain	September 11	Jabi Olabarria Etxebarria	Maite Maiora Elizondo
14	Sentiero delle Grigne	Italy	September 18	Tom Owens	Emanuela Brizio
Champions				(Spain) Luis Alberto Hernando	(Spain) Oihana Kortazar Aranzeta

== Men's standings ==
The champions based on the sum of the best three World Series’ race results and one World Series Trial.

Winner
Bonus races (20% extra points)

#	Athlete	Tot	1	2	3	4	5	6	7	8	9	10	11	12	13	14
#	Athlete	Tot	FRA (France); 05/8	ESP (Spain); 05/29	GRE (Greece); 05/29	AND (Andorra); 06/26	ESP (Spain); 07/3	ITA (Italy); 07/17	GBR (United Kingdom); 07/23	ITA (Italy); 07/24	SUI (Switzerland); 08/14	USA (United States); 08/20	FRA (France); 08/20	JPN (Japan); 08/28	ESP (Spain); 09/11	ITA (Italy) 09/18
1	(Spain) Luis Alberto Hernando Alzaga	371.60	78			100	100			100	72					94
2	(Italy) Mikhail Mamleev	346.40	88	24				100		72						86
3	(Spain) Jabi Olabarria Etxebarria	309.60	68	34			72			60					100	82
4	(Spain) Pere Aurell Bové	271.20	44	60		88				26	14					79
5	(Spain) Aritz Kortabarria Rajado	268.40	50	66						12			58		78	74
6	(Spain) Xavier Espiña Martinez	239.20	62	38		72	48			44		50				55
7	(Spain) Jokin Lizeaga Mitxelena	236.80	64				54	72		48						53
8	(Spain) Fernando Etxegarai	234.40	60				60			36					88	50
10	(United Kingdom) Tom Owens	208.00		88												120
9	(Andorra) Marc Casal Mir	202.00	36			64				6		42				60
11	(Spain) Cristòfol Castanyer Bernat	200.00					68			68	64					
12	(Italy) Marco De Gasperi	200.00	100								100					
13	(Spain) Miguel Caballero Ortega	196.00		20			88			88						
14	(Spain) Javier Rodríguez Bodas	186.80		32									78			77
15	(Spain) Toti Bes Ginesta	184.00	66				66			52						
16	(Andorra) Oscar Casal Mir	182.00	32			68				30		52				
17	(Spain) Kilian Jornet Burgada	178.00		100							78					
18	(Andorra) Ferran Teixidó	174.40	58			54										62
19	(Spain) Just Sociats Asensio	168.00				78				66	24					
20	(France) Michel Rabat	162.00		62									100			
21	(Italy) Jean Pellissier	150.00	72	16								62				
22	(Spain) Iñigo Lasaga Arburua	137.60	16	28						2					48	46
23	(Spain) Miguel A. Heras Hernandez	128.00		78			50									
24	(Italy) Giovanni Tacchini	120.00		58						62						
25	(Italy) Stefano Butti	105.60														106
26	(France) Laurent Brossard	104.00	40										64			
27	(Spain) Santiago Garcia Soria	102.00		46			36				20					
28	(Spain) Oscar Roig Iglesias	102.00					46					56				
29	(Japan) Dai Matsumoto	100.00												100		
30	(United States) Mario Macias	100.00										100				
31	(United Kingdom) Andi Jones	100.00							100							
32	(Greece) Alexandros Kampouropoulos	100.00			100											
