= 2010 Skyrunner World Series =

- Overall: (Spain) Tofol Castañer (Italy) Emanuela Brizio

Competitions
- Venues: 14 venues
- Individual: 14 events

The 2010 Skyrunner World Series was the 9th edition of the global skyrunning competition, Skyrunner World Series, organised by the International Skyrunning Federation from 2002.

Same format of the seasons 2008 and 2009.

== Results ==
The series has developed in 14 races from May to September.

Race of Skyrunner World Series
Race of Skyrunner World Series Trails

#	Race	Country	Date	Men's winner	Women's winner
1	Elbrus Vertical Kilometer	Russia	8 May	(Russia) Dmitry Ploskonosov	(United States) Megan Kimmel
2	Maratòn Alpina Zegama-Aizkorri	Spain	16 May	(Spain) Kílian Jornet Burgada	(Italy) Emanuela Brizio
3	Travessa de Canilllo SkyRace	Andorra	6 June	(Spain) Sebastian Sánchez	(New Zealand) Anna Frost
4	Circuito dos 3 Cântaros SkyRace	Portugal	13 June	(Portugal) Aires Sousa	(Portugal) Rosa Madureira
5	Chaberton Marathon	France	1 August	(Spain) Tofol Castañer	(New Zealand) Anna Frost
6	Course de Sierre-Zinal	Switzerland	8 August	(Spain) Kilian Jornet	(Switzerland) Megan Lund
7	Red Rock SkyMarathon	Italy	22 August	(Italy) Michele Tavernaro	(Italy) Emanuela Brizio
8	Pikes Peak Marathon	United States	22 August	(United States) Matt Carpenter	(United States) Keri Nelson
9	Mont Ontake SkyRace	Japan	29 August	(Japan) Dai Matsumoto	(Japan) Yasuko Nomura
10	Ben Nevis Race	United Kingdom	4 September	(United Kingdom) Finlay Wild	(Italy) Cecilia Mora
11	Carrera La Sagra	Spain	11 September	(Spain) Jessed Hernández	(Spain) Blanca Maria Serrano
12	Ávila SkyRace	Venezuela	12 September	(Peru) Emerson Trujillo	(Venezuela) Cruz Salazar
13	Sentiero delle Grigne	Italy	19 September	(Spain) Miguel Ángel Heras	(Spain) Mireia Miró Varela
14	Mount Kinabalu Climbathon	Malaysia	24 September	(Italy) Marco De Gasperi	(Spain) Nuria Picas
Champions				(Spain) Tofol Castañer	(Italy) Emanuela Brizio

== Standings ==
Scoring system

Position	1	2	3	4	5	6	7	8	9	10	11	12	13	14	15	16	17	18	19	20	21	22	23	24	25	26	27	28	29	30	31	32	33	34	35	36	37	38	39	40
Points	100	88	78	72	68	66	64	62	60	58	56	54	52	50	48	46	44	42	40	38	36	34	32	30	28	26	24	22	20	18	16	14	12	10	8	6	4	2	2	2

The champions based on the sum of the best three World Series’ race results and one World Series Trial.

Race of Skyrunner World Series
Race of Skyrunner World Series Trails
Wins
Points discarded
Bonus races (20% extra points)

=== Men ===
#	Athlete	Tot	1	2	3	4	5	6	7	8	9	10	11	12	13	14
#	Athlete	Tot	8/5; RUS (Russia)	16/5; ESP (Spain)	6/6; AND (Andorra)	13/6; POR (Portugal)	1/8; FRA (France)	8/8; SUI (Switzerland)	22/8; ITA (Italy)	22/8; USA (United States)	29/8; JPN (Japan)	4/9; GBR (United Kingdom)	11/9; ESP (Spain)	12/9; VEN (Venezuela)	19/9; ITA (Italy)	24/9; MAS (Malaysia)
1	Tofol Castañer	348		62		88	100			66						94
2	Jessed Hernández	324				78	88			72			100		64	
3	Sebastian Sánchez	303			100		68								58	77
4	Iñigo Lasaga	269		54		56	64		72						52	79
5	Just Sociats	246					58			56			78		54	
6	Xavier Espiña	232		32		48	50								48	86
7	Aritz Kortabarria	232		66		58	66								42	
8	Francisco Javier Rodríguez	224		46		38	54						68		56	
9	Jordi Bes	210					60			78					72	
10	Kilian Jornet	200		100				100								
11	Miguel Ángel Heras	178		78											100	
12	Josu Bengoetxea	174		56		62	56									
13	Maurizio Fenaroli	156					78		78							
14	Jesús Mari Romón	152				44	62								46	
15	Sota Ogawa	146									72					74
16	Michele Tavernaro	144							100						44	
17	Ricky Lightfoot	139											72			67
18	Dachhiri Sherpa	138					72								66	
19	Marco De Gasperi	120														120
20	Helmut Schiessl	116						54							62	
21	Jose Felipe Larrazabal	108					42		66							
22	Sumping Suprey	106													24	82
23	Iván Ortiz	106		18									88			
24	Sudip Kulung	106														105,6
25	Emerson Trujillo	100												100		
26	Finlay Wild	100										100				
27	Dai Matsumoto	100									100					
28	Matt Carpenter	100								100						
29	Aires Sousa	100				100										
30	Dmitry Ploskonosov	100	100													

=== Women ===
#	Athlete	Tot	1	2	3	4	5	6	7	8	9	10	11	12	13	14
#	Athlete	Tot	8/5; RUS (Russia)	16/5; ESP (Spain)	6/6; AND (Andorra)	13/6; POR (Portugal)	1/8; FRA (France)	8/8; SUI (Switzerland)	22/8; ITA (Italy)	22/8; USA (United States)	29/8; JPN (Japan)	4/9; GBR (United Kingdom)	11/9; ESP (Spain)	12/9; VEN (Venezuela)	19/9; ITA (Italy)	24/9; MAS (Malaysia)
1	Emanuela Brizio	382		100	78		88		100						78	94
2	Anna Frost	374			100		100								68	106
3	Cecilia Mora	352		68			78			88		100			72	86
4	Nerea Amilibia	316		88		88	68		88						64	72
5	Laia Andreu	288		62			66			72			88		60	
6	Nuria Picas	280					72								88	120
7	Megan Kimmel	242	100	64						78						
8	Yasuko Nomura	177									100					77
9	Blanca Maria Serrano	154		54									100			
10	Yuri Kanbara	140								68	72					
11	Stephanie Jimenez	132		72				60								
12	Maribel Martín	128			68	66	60									
13	Nerea Martinez	110		52											58	
14	Cinzia Bertasa	106		56											50	
15	Mireia Miro	100													100	
16	Cruz Salazar	100												100		
17	Keri Nelson	100								100						
18	Megan Lund	100						100								
19	Rosa Madureira	100				100										
