= 2018 Skyrunner World Series =

Competitions
- Venues: 18 venues
- Individual: 18 events

The 2018 Skyrunner World Series was the 17th edition of the global skyrunning competition, Skyrunner World Series, organised by the International Skyrunning Federation from 2002.

In this edition, compared with 2017, the Sky Extreme and Sky Ultra races have been unified in a single category called Sky Extra. The calendar was announced by ISF in October 2017.

== Calendar ==
Bonus races (50% extra points)

=== Sky Classic ===
#	Date	Race	Distance	Vertical climb	Venue
1	30 April	Yading Skyrun	29 km	+2,345m	Yading, China
2	27 May	Maratòn Alpina Zegama-Aizkorri	42 km	+2,736m	Zegama, Spain
3	16 June	Livigno SkyMarathon	34 km	+2,500m	Livigno, Italy
4	23 June	Olympus Marathon	44 km	+3,200m	Dion, Greece
5	1 July	Buff Epic Trail 42K	42 km	+3,200m	Barruera, Spain
6	22 July	Dolomites SkyRace	22 km	+1,750m	Canazei, Italy
7	29 July	SkyRace Comapedrosa	21 km	+2,280m	Arinsal, Andorra
8	25 August	Matterhorn Ultraks Sky	49 km	+3,600m	Zermatt, Switzerland
9	1 September	The Rut 28K	28 km	+2,375m	Big Sky Resort, United States
10	13 October	Limone Extreme SkyRace	29 km	+2,500m	Limone sul Garda, Italy

=== Sky Extra ===
#	Date	Race	Distance	Vertical climb	Venue
1	12 May	Transvulcania Ultramarathon	75 km	+4,350m	La Palma, Spain
2	2 June	Ultra SkyMarathon Madeira	55 km	+4,000m	Madeira Island, Portugal
3	7 July	High Trail Vanoise	70 km	+5,400m	Val d’Isère, France
4	4 August	Tromsø SkyRace	50 km	+4,600m	Tromsø, Norway
5	26 August	Trofeo Kima	52 km	+4,200m	Val Masino, Italy
6	16 September	Salomon Glen Coe Skyline	55 km	+4,750m	(United Kingdom) Kinlochleven, UK
7	29 September	Salomon Ultra Pirineu	110 km	+6,800m	Bagà, Spain
8	6 October	Pirin Ultra SkyRace	66 km	+4,200m	Bansko, Bulgaria
