= 2007 Skyrunner World Series =

- Overall: (Spain) Kílian Jornet Burgada (United Kingdom) Angela Mudge

Competitions
- Venues: 7 venues
- Individual: 7 events

The 2007 Skyrunner World Series was the 6th edition of the global skyrunning competition, Skyrunner World Series, organised by the International Skyrunning Federation from 2002.

== Results ==
The World Cup has developed in 7 races from May to September.

Race	Date	Men's winner	Women's winner
Marató de Muntanya de Berga (Catalunya-Spain)	May 20	Raul Garcia Castan	Angela Mudge
SkyMarathon Sentiero 4 Luglio (Corteno Golgi, Italy)	July 1	Andrew Symonds	Corinne Favre
SkyRace Andorra (Vallnord, Andorra)	July 22	Kílian Jornet Burgada	Angela Mudge
Dolomites SkyRace (Italy)	July 29	Mitja Kosovelj	Angela Mudge
Mount Kinabalu Climbathon (Malaysia)	August 26	Kílian Jornet Burgada	Monica Ardid
OSJ Ontake SkyRace (Japan)	September 2	Kílian Jornet Burgada	Stéphanie Jiménez
Maratòn Alpina Zegama-Aizkorri (Euskadi-Spain)	September 23	Kílian Jornet Burgada	Corinne Favre
2007 champions		Kílian Jornet Burgada	Angela Mudge (2)

== Men's standings ==
Winner
Bonus races (100% extra points)

#	Athlete	1	2	3	4	5	6	7	Tot
#	Athlete	ESP (Spain); 20/05	ITA (Italy); 01/07	AND (Andorra); 22/07	ITA (Italy); 29/07	MAS (France); 26/08	JPN (Japan); 02/09	ESP (Spain); 23/09	Tot
1	(Spain) Kilian Jornet			100		100	100	200	500
2	(Spain) Raul Garcia Castan	100	62	78			78	176	432
3	(Spain) Tofol Castanyer	88	78	72	88			136	390
4	(United Kingdom) Andrew Symonds		100	56	66			120	342
5	(Spain) Jessed Hernandez			64	72	64	72	132	340
6	(Spain) Fernando Echegaray	78	50	52	40			144	324
7	(Spain) Agusti Roc			88	78	88	60		314
8	(Spain) Ionut Zinca	62	40	58	62			116	298
9	(Spain) Juan Antonio Ruiz	60	18	46	34		62	60	228
10	(Andorra) Eduard Barcelo	68	46	48				48	210
11	(Italy) Marco Rusconi	72	42	54	38				206
12	(Spain) Jose Felipe Larrazabal	58	32	36	22			62	188
13	(United Kingdom) John Heneghan			68	68				136
14	(Spain) Marc Sola		88		48				136
15	(Spain) Adolfo Aguilo	50	30	32				20	132
16	(Japan) Tadao Yokoyama	66				62			128
17	(United Kingdom) Thomas Owens		64		60				124
18	(Spain) Juan Carlos Sanchez	44	2	40				34	120
19	(Spain) Sebastian Sanchez	40	10	34				32	116
20	(Italy) Paolo Larger		52		56				108
21	(Slovenia) Mitja Kosovelj				100				100
