= 2013 Skyrunner World Series =

12th edition of Skyrunner World Series

Winners
- SkyRace: (Spain) Kílian Jornet (United States) Stevie Kremer
- Sky Ultra: (Spain) Kílian Jornet (Sweden) Emelie Forsberg
- Vertical Kilometer: (Italy) Urban Zemmer (Spain) Laura Orgué

Competitions
- Venues: 12 venues
- Individual: 15 events

The 2013 Skyrunner World Series was the 12th edition of the global skyrunning competition, Skyrunner World Series, organised by the International Skyrunning Federation from 2002.

For the first time it is not assign an overall title but only those in the category.

== Results ==
=== Category Sky ===
Bonus races (20% extra points)

Race	Date	Men's winner	Women's winner
Maratòn Alpina Zegama-Aizkorri (Spain)	May 26	Kílian Jornet Burgada	Emelie Forsberg
Mont Blanc Marathon (France)	June 30	Kílian Jornet Burgada	Stevie Kremer
Pikes Peak Marathon (USA)	August 18	Toru Miyahara	Stevie Kremer
Matterhorn Ultraks (Switzerland)	August 24	Kílian Jornet Burgada	Emelie Forsberg
Limone Extreme (Italy)	October 13	Kílian Jornet Burgada	Stevie Kremer
2013 SkyRace champions		Kílian Jornet Burgada	Stevie Kremer

=== Category Ultra ===
Bonus races (20% extra points)

Race	Date	Men's winner	Women's winner
Transvulcania (Spain)	May 11	Kílian Jornet Burgada	Emelie Forsberg
Ronda dels Cims (Andorra)	June 21	Julian Chorier	Francesca Canepa
Ice Trail Tarentaise (France)	July 14	Kílian Jornet Burgada	Emelie Forsberg
Speedgoat (USA)	July 27	Sage Canaday	Stephanie Howe
Ultra Race of Champions (USA)	September 28	Rob Krar	Emelie Forsberg
2013 Ultra champions		Kílian Jornet Burgada	Emelie Forsberg

=== Category Vertical ===
Bonus races (20% extra points)

Race	Date	Men's winner	Women's winner
Elbrus Vertical (Russia)	May 7	Marco Facchinelli	Larisa Soboleva
Cara Amon Vertical (Spain)	May 18	Urban Zemmer	Laura Orgué
Chamonix Kilomètre Vertical (France)	June 28	Saul Antonio Padua	Christel Dewalle
Gerania Vertical (Greece)	September 8	Nejc Kuhar	Vanesa Ortega Trancon
Limone Extreme Vertical Kilometer (Italy)	October 11	Urban Zemmer	Laura Orgué
2013 VK champions		Urban Zemmer	Laura Orgué
