= 2008 Skyrunner World Series =

- Overall: (Spain) Kílian Jornet Burgada (France) Corinne Favre

Competitions
- Venues: 14 venues
- Individual: 14 events

The 2008 Skyrunner World Series was the 7th edition of the global skyrunning competition, Skyrunner World Series, organised by the International Skyrunning Federation from 2002.

From this year and up to 2011 (4 editions) was introduced Skyrunner World Series Trials.

== Skyrunner World Series Races ==
The World Cup has developed in 6 races from May to September. in addition at the 8 trials.

Bonus races (100% extra points first ten men and first five women )

Race	Date	Men's winner	Women's winner
Marató de Muntanya de Berga (Catalunya-Spain)	May 11	Jessed Hernàndez	Corinne Favre
Valmalenco-Valposchiavo, (Italy / Switzerland)	June 8	Kílian Jornet Burgada	Angela Mudge
SkyRace Andorra (Vallnord, Andorra)	June 29	Kílian Jornet Burgada	Rosa Madureira
Mount Kinabalu Climbathon (Malaysia)	August 24	Agustí Roc Amador	Corinne Favre
Ben Nevis Race (Fort William, United Kingdom)	September 6	Agustí Roc Amador	Angela Mudge
Sentiero delle Grigne (Pasturo, Italy)	September 21	Kílian Jornet Burgada	Emanuela Brizio
2008 champions		Kílian Jornet Burgada (2)	Corinne Favre (2)

== Skyrunner World Series Trials ==
8 races in calendar.

Date	Country	Race	Men's winner	Women's winner
April, 6	Mexico	SkyRace Mexiquense	Tomás Pérez	Alicia Rodríguez
June, 15	Portugal	Circuito dos 3 Cântaros SkyRace	Aires Sousa	Rosa Madureira
June, 22	Spain	Maratón Alpino Madrileño	Andy Symonds	Mónica Aguilera
July, 13	France	SkyRace de Serre Chevalier	Vincent Delebarre	Corinne Favre
July, 27	Italy	Giir di Mont	Kilian Jornet	Stéphanie Jiménez
August, 10	Switzerland	Course de Sierre-Zinal	Marco De Gasperi	Anna Pichrtova
August, 16-17	United States	Pikes Peak Marathon	Matt Carpenter	Keri Nelson
August, 31	Japan	OSJ Ontake SkyRace	Dai Matsumoto	Yasuko Nomura

== Final rankings ==
Men
1st (Spain) Kilian Jornet (Salomon Santiveri) 500 points
2nd (Spain) Jessed Hernández (FEEC) 422 points
3rd (Spain) Agustí Roc (Salomon Santiveri) 414 points

Women
1st (France) Corinne Favre (FEEC) 476 points
2nd (United Kingdom) Angela Mudge 444 points
3rd (Spain) Rosa Madureira (Selección portuguesa) 432 points
4th (Andorra) Stephanie Jiménez (Salomon Santiveri-Selecció Andorrana) 412 points
