= 2009 Skyrunner World Series =

- Overall: (Spain) Kílian Jornet Burgada (Italy) Emanuela Brizio

Competitions
- Venues: 15 venues
- Individual: 15 events

The 2009 Skyrunner World Series was the 8th edition of the global skyrunning competition, Skyrunner World Series, organised by the International Skyrunning Federation from 2002.

Same format of the season 2008.

== Skyrunner World Series Races ==
The World Cup has developed in 7 races from April to October, in addition at the 8 trials.

Bonus races (100% extra points first fifteen)

Race	Date	Men's winner	Women's winner
Irazú SkyRace (Costa Rica)	April 18	Ricardo Mejía	Emanuela Brizio
Maratòn Alpina Zegama-Aizkorri (Spain)	May 24	Ricky Lightfoot	Emanuela Brizio
SkyRace Andorra (Vallnord, Andorra)	June 28	Kílian Jornet Burgada	Emanuela Brizio
Giir di Mont (Italy)	July 26	Kílian Jornet Burgada	Stéphanie Jiménez
Pikes Peak Marathon (United States)	August 16	Matt Carpenter	Anita Ortiz
Ben Nevis Race (United Kingdom)	September 5	Rob Jebb	Mireia Miró Varela
Mount Kinabalu Climbathon (Malaysia)	October 24 & 25	Kílian Jornet Burgada	Emanuela Brizio
2009 champions		Kílian Jornet Burgada (3)	Emanuela Brizio

== Skyrunner World Series Trials ==
8 races in calendar.

Race	Country	Date	Men's winner	Women's winner
SkyRace Mexiquense Nevado de Toluca	Mexico	8 March	Tomás Pérez	Irene Vazquez
Circuito dos 3 Cantaros	Portugal	31 May	Aires Sousa	Rosa Madureira
International SkyRace Valposchiavo	Switzerland	7 June	Robert Krupicka	Anna Pichrtova
Monte Rosa SkyMarathon	Italy	12 July	Fulvio Dapit	Emanuela Brizio
Chaberton Marathon	France	2 August	Jokin Lizeaga	Maud Giraud
Avila SkyRace	Venezuela	9 August	Lubín Arocha	Rosa Méndez
Mount Ontake SkyRace	Japan	30 August	Toru Miyahara	Yasuko Nomura
Puyada Oturia	Spain	27 September	Tofol Castañer	Ester Gil
