= 2002 Skyrunner World Series =

Sporting event

- Overall: (Spain) Agustí Roc Amador (France) Corinne Favre

Competitions
- Venues: 7 venues
- Individual: 7 events

The 2002 Skyrunner World Series was the 1st edition of the global skyrunning competition, Skyrunner World Series, organised by the International Skyrunning Federation from 2002.

== Results ==
The World Cup has developed in 7 races from July to October.

Race	Country	Date	Men's winner	Women's winner
X-Marathon de la Val d'Aran	Spain	7 July	(Spain) Agustí Roc Amador	(Spain) Carme Tort
Barr Trail Mountain Race	United States	14 July	(United States) Paul Low	(United States) Kelli Lusk
Ville d'Aoste SkyRace	Italy	21 July	(Italy) Bruno Brunod	(Italy) Gloriana Pellissier
Course de Sierre-Zinal	Switzerland	11 August	(New Zealand) Jonathan Wyatt	(Germany) Gudrun De Pay
Trofeo Kima	Italy	25 August	(Italy) Giovanni Gianola	(France) Corinne Favre
Val d'Isère Vertical Kilometer	France	1 September	(Italy) Marco De Gasperi	(Italy) Antonella Confortola
Mount Kinabalu International Climbathon	Malaysia	5–6 October	(Spain) Agustí Roc Amador	(Czech Republic) Anna Pichrtova
Champions			(Spain) Agustí Roc Amador	(France) Corinne Favre

== Final ranking ==
The final ranking of the Championship is done by summing up the four best scores in the World Circuit races. In the event of a former victory, the score is divided and in the case of the same score in the circuit, who has won more victories.

Men

Rank	Athlete	Points
1	(Spain) Agustí Roc Amador	360
2	(Italy) Bruno Brunod	332
3	(Spain) Jordi Martín	268

Women

Rank	Athlete	Points
1	(France) Corinne Favre	364
2	(Italy) Gloriana Pellissier	320
3	(Spain) Carme Tort	306
