= 2003 Skyrunner World Series =

- Overall: (Spain) Agustí Roc Amador (Spain) Teresa Forn

Competitions
- Venues: 7 venues
- Individual: 7 events

The 2003 Skyrunner World Series was the 2nd edition of the global skyrunning competition, Skyrunner World Series, organised by the International Skyrunning Federation from 2002.

== Results ==
The World Cup has developed in 7 races from June to September.

| Race | Country | Date | Men's winner | Women's winner |
|---|---|---|---|---|
| Maraton Alpino Madrileno | Spain | 15 June | (Spain) Agustí Roc Amador | (France) Corinne Favre |
| Sentiero 4 Luglio SkyRace | Italy | 6 July | (Italy) Mario Poletti | (France) Corinne Favre |
| Val d'Isère Vertical Kilometer | France | 12 July | (Italy) Marco De Gasperi | (France) Corinne Favre |
| Barr Trail Mountain Race | United States | 13 July | (United States) Paul Low | (United States) Kelli Lusk |
| Sierre-Zinal | Switzerland | 10 August | (New Zealand) Jonathan Wyatt | (Ethiopia) Tsige Worku |
| Cervinia SkyMarathon | Italy | 7 September | (Italy) Lucio Fregona | (Italy) Gisella Bendotti |
| Mount Kinabalu Climbathon | Malaysia | 4 October | (Italy) Marco De Gasperi | (Malaysia) Kuilin Danny Gongot |
| Champions | | | (Spain) Agustí Roc Amador | (Spain) Teresa Forn |
