= 2005 Skyrunner World Series =

- Overall: (United Kingdom) Rob Jebb (France) Corinne Favre

Competitions
- Venues: 7 venues
- Individual: 7 events

The 2005 Skyrunner World Series was the 4th edition of the global skyrunning competition, Skyrunner World Series, organised by the International Skyrunning Federation from 2002.

== Results ==
The World Cup has developed in 7 races from May to October.

Race	Date	Men's winner	Women's winner
Maratòn Alpina Zegama-Aizkorri, Spain	May 29	Rob Jebb	Corinne Favre
Valmalenco-Valposchiavo, Italy / Switzerland	June 12	Ricardo Mejía	Emanuela Brizio
Dolomites SkyRace, Italy	July 24	Michele Tavernaro	Corinne Favre
La 6000D SkyRace, France	July 31	Rob Jebb	Corinne Favre
Pikes Peak Marathon, United States	August 21	Fulvio Dapit	Corinne Favre
Sentiero delle Grigne, Italy	September 18	Dennis Brunod	Corinne Favre
Mount Kinabalu Climbathon, Malaysia	October 1–2	Ricardo Mejía	Anna Pichrtová
2005 champions		Rob Jebb	Corinne Favre
