= 2012 Skyrunner World Series =

Winners
- SkyRace: (Spain) Luis Hernando (Russia) Zhanna Vokueva
- Sky Ultra: (Spain) Kílian Jornet (Spain) Núria Picas
- Vertical Kilometer: (Italy) Urban Zemmer (Spain) Laura Orgué
- Overall: (Spain) Kílian Jornet (Sweden) Emelie Forsberg

Competitions
- Venues: 13 venues
- Individual: 15 events

The 2012 Skyrunner World Series was the 11th edition of the global skyrunning competition, Skyrunner World Series, organised by the International Skyrunning Federation from 2002.

From this edition there is a new format: three different categories and four different champions including the overall champion.

== Results ==
=== Category SkyRace ===
Race	Date	Men's winner	Women's winner
Elbrus World Race (Russia)	May 9	Luis Alberto Hernando Alzaga	Zhanna Vokueva
Ziria Skyrace (Greece)	May 27	Luis Alberto Hernando Alzaga	Zhanna Vokueva
Snowdon Race (UK)	July 21	Murray Strain	Tessa Hill
Dolomites SkyRace (Italy)	July 22	Kílian Jornet Burgada	Emelie Forsberg
Marathon du Montcalm (France)	August 18	Jokin Lizeaga Mitxelena	Silvia Serafini
2012 SkyRace champions		Luis Alberto Hernando Alzaga	Zhanna Vokueva

=== Category Ultra ===
Bonus races (20% extra points)

Race	Date	Men's winner	Women's winner
Transvulcania (Spain)	May 12	Dakota Jones	Anna Heather Frost
Speedgoat (USA)	July 28	Kílian Jornet Burgada	Anna Heather Frost
Trofeo Kima (Italy)	August 28	Kílian Jornet Burgada	Nuria Picas Albets
Cavalls del Vent (Spain)	September 29	Kílian Jornet Burgada	Nuria Picas Albets
Gran Trail des Templiers (France)	October 28	Fabien Antolinos	Nuria Picas Albets
2012 Ultra champions		Kílian Jornet Burgada	Nuria Picas Albets

=== Category Vertical Kilometer ===
Bonus races (20% extra points)

Race	Date	Men's winner	Women's winner
Elbrus Vertical Kilometer (Russia)	May 7	Marco De Gasperi	Larisa Soboleva
Gerania Vertical Kilometer (Greece)	June 10	Urban Zemmer	Laura Orgué
Dolomites Vertical Kilometer (Italy)	July 20	Nejc Kuhar	Antonella Confortola
Kilomètre Vertical de Fully (Switzerland)	October 20	Urban Zemmer	Christel Dewalle
Vertical Kilometer del Puig Campana (Spain)	November 11	Urban Zemmer	Blanca Maria Serrano
2012 VK champions		Urban Zemmer	Laura Orgué

=== Combined ranking ===
Race	Date	Men's winner	Women's winner
2012 champions		Kílian Jornet Burgada (4)	Emelie Forsberg
