= Italian Skyrunning Championships =

- Current season, competition or edition: 2017
- Sport: Skyrunning
- Founded: Italian Athletics Federation
- First season: 2003
- Country: Italy
- Most titles: 6 Tadei Pivk (men); 10 Emanuela Brizio (women)
- Website: FISKY web site

The Italian Skyrunning Championships (Italian: Campionati italiani di skyrunning) is the national championship in skyrunning, organised every year by the Italian Skyrunning Federation (FISKY) since 2003, with the patronage of the International Skyrunning Federation (ISF).

== Editions ==
Until 2010, the championships had a unique standings, and from the 2011 edition titles were awarded in the various skyrunning specialties.

Edition	Year	Speciality	Date	Race (Venue)	Notes
9th	2011	SkyRace	26 June-11 September	3 races	
9th	2011	SkyMarathon	3 July	Maratona del Cielo (Aprica)	
9th	2011	Vertical Kilometer	28 August	Trofeo Latemar Vertical Kilometer (Predazzo)	
10th	2012	SkyRace	17 June-2 September	4 races	
10th	2012	SkyMarathon	1 July-16 September	4 races	
10th	2012	Ultra SkyMarathon	23 September	Trail d'Oulx (Oulx)	
10th	2012	Vertical Kilometer	2 June-14 October	4 races	
11th	2013	SkyRace	30 June-8 September	5 races	
11th	2013	Ultra SkyMarathon	16 June-20 October	3 races	
11th	2013	Vertical Kilometer	2 June-2 August	3 races	
12th	2014	SkyRace	15 June	International Skyrace Carnia (Paluzza)	
12th	2014	Ultra SkyMarathon	13 September	Sella Ronda Trail Running (Dolomiti)	
12th	2014	Vertical Kilometer	31 August	Trofeo Latemar Vertical Kilometer (Predazzo)	
13th	2015	SkyRace	23 August	La Veia Skyrace (Val Bognanco)	
13th	2015	SkyMarathon	5 July	Sentiero 4 Luglio (Corteno Golgi)	
13th	2015	Ultra SkyMarathon	2 August	Royal Ultra SkyMarathon (Ceresole Reale)	
13th	2015	Vertical Kilometer	26 July	Vertical KM Col de Lana (Arabba)	
14th	2016	SkyRace	19 June	International Skyrace Carnia (Paluzza)	
14th	2016	SkyMarathon	2 July	Sentiero 4 Luglio (Corteno Golgi)	
14th	2016	Ultra SkyMarathon	10 July	Cervino Xtrail 55 km (Cervino)	
14th	2016	Vertical Kilometer	11 June	New Balance Cervino Mattheron (Cervino)	
15th	2017	SkyRace	17 September	New Balance Cervino Matterhorn (Cervino)	
15th	2017	SkyMarathon	12 September	La Via di Annibale (Usseglio)	
15th	2017	Ultra SkyMarathon	11 June	Ultra Serra di Celano (Celano)	
15th	2017	Vertical Kilometer	11 June	Lattebusche VK (Domegge di Cadore)	

== Champions ==
=== Unique title ===
Year	Men's winner	Women's winner
2003	Mario Poletti	Maria Giovanna Cerutti
2004	Fabio Bonfanti	
2005	Lucio Fregona	Daniela Gilardi
2006	Lucio Fregona	Emanuela Brizio
2007	Fulvio Dapit	Emanuela Brizio
2008	Paolo Larger	Emanuela Brizio
2009	Matteo Piller Hofer	Paola Romanini
2010	Tadei Pivk	Emanuela Brizio

=== Specialty titles ===
	SkyRace		SkyMarathon		UltraMarathon	
Year	Men's winner	Women's winner	Men's winner	Women's winner	Men's winner	Women's winner
2011	Mikhail Mamleev	Emanuela Brizio	Titta Scalet	Emanuela Brizio		
2012	Franco Sancassani	Debora Cardone	Tadei Pivk	Silvia Serafini	Fabio Bazzana	Silvia Serafini
2013	Tadei Pivk	Silvia Serafini			Clemente Berlingheri	Emanuela Brizio
2014	Tadei Pivk	Emanuela Brizio			Georg Piazza	Silvia Rampazzo
2015	Dennis Brunod	Emanuela Brizio	Tadei Pivk	Emanuela Brizio	Fulvio Dapit	Raffaella Miravalle
2016	Nicolò Francescatto	Silvia Rampazzo	Tadei Pivk	Silvia Rampazzo	Franco Collè	Katia Fori
2017	Daniel Antonioli	Denise Dragomir	Stefano Castagneri	Cristiana Follador	Antonio Carfagnini	Tamara Ferrante
2018	Daniel Antonioli	Lisa Buzzoni	Cristian Minoggio	Elisa Desco		
2019	Rok Bratina	Silvia Rampazzo	Daniel Antonioli	Daniela Rota		

	Vertical		Vertical Sprint		SkyScraper	
Year	Men's winner	Women's winner	Men's	Women's winner	Men's	Women's winner
2011	Urban Zemmer	Erika Forni				
2012	Marco De Gasperi	Debora Cardone				
2013	Marco Facchinelli	Elisa Compagnoni				
2014	Nicola Pedergnana	Stephanie Jimenez				
2015	Manfred Reichegger	Francesca Rossi				
2016	Hannes Perkmann	Francesca Rossi				
2017	Manuel Da Col	Francesca Rossi				
2018	Patrik Facchini	Elena Nicolini	Emanule Manzi	Valentina Belotti		
2019	Fabio Pasini	Samantha Galassi	Alex Oberbacher	Raffaella Tempesta	Fabio Ruga	Elisa Sortini

== See also ==
- Italian Vertical Kilometer Championships
