= Brunod (surname) =

Brunod is an Italian surname originated in the Aosta Valley. Notable people with the surname include:

- Bruno Brunod (born 1962), Italian bicyclist
- Dennis Brunod (born 1978), Italian ski mountaineer, mountain and skyrunner
