= Adidas Kampung =

Generic name for cheap black rubber shoes made in Malaysia

Adidas Kampung is a generic name for cheap black rubber shoes that are usually made in Malaysia. The first time was introduced by Tuan Lakai Adang, a member of the Police Field Force on September 19, 1974, in Keningau, Sabah.

Being made 100% out of rubber, they are waterproof, easy to dry, and thus ideal for trekking in tropical weather. They gained attention in the blogosphere when they were featured as having been used by local climbers to win various climbathons such as the Mount Kinabalu International Climbathon held in Sabah. One particular model comes with four yellow stripes and studded soles and is commonly used by villagers to play football. Its similarities to the famed stripes on Adidas shoes earned it the moniker Adidas Kampung, or the Village Adidas.

Adidas Kampungs are easily found in sundry shops in the villages of Malaysia for under RM10.00.
