= Skyrunner World Series =

International championship of high altitude endurance races

- Status: active
- Genre: sporting event
- Date: from March to November
- Frequency: annual
- Location: various
- Country: Worldwide
- Inaugurated: 2002
- Most recent: 2026
- Organiser: ISF
- Website: skyrunnerworldseries.com

The Skyrunner World Series is an annual international championship of skyrunning (high altitude endurance races) and the official International Skyrunning Federation (ISF) race circuit for mountain running. Each year the Skyrunner World Series presents a global Sky Racing calendar, attracting mountain running athletes from almost every country.

== History ==
Skyrunning was founded in 1992 by Italian Marino Giacometti, President of the International Skyrunning Federation which sanctions the discipline worldwide. The SWS was launched in 2004 and has grown to represent the peak of outdoor running defined by altitude and technicality. In 2017, Migu Run, an advanced online and offline exercise and health management platform founded in China, became title sponsor of the Migu Run Skyrunner World Series.

== Definition of a Skyrunner World Series Sky Race ==
Skyrunning stands apart from other mountain running activities. The criteria of a SWS Sky Race are:

- Race Duration: Day-long races with a time limit of 16 hours.
- Race Distance: Sky Races feature distances from 22 km to 66 km to enable full intensity performance throughout the race.
- Race Values: Races are characterised by their technicality, speed, intensity and extreme terrain.

Altitude (average and maximum reached), peak reach, running on snow/glacier, grade II climbing difficulty and increased elevation percentage are other factors also taken into account when defining a Sky Race.

== 2019 rules and rankings ==
The 2019 Skyrunner World Series proposes two ranking systems. The single season ranking, introduced in 2019 and limited to the Skyrunner World Series, and the 52-week ranking which encompasses all races, including the Skyrunner National Series races.

=== The single season ranking ===
In 2019, the Skyrunner World Series introduced the first single ranking system. The objective of the general ranking is to unify the circuits and key races to make the series even more competitive and define who is the best Skyrunner in the World; a Skyrunner being someone able to face any type of mountain with technicality, speed and intensity, and serves as a base to distribute the end of season bonus pool.

The 2019 Skyrunner World Series season runs from April to October. It consists of 15 races in 11 countries and concludes with the "SkyMasters", the end of season race open only to qualified athletes.

Athletes are ranked on their top 4 points results of the season, of which no more than 2 can be "SuperSky Races" - races rewarding twice as many points as a Sky Race, plus the SkyMasters points.

At each race, points will be attributed to the top twenty finishers in a symmetric manner for men and women according to the following grid:

Pos.	Sky Race	SuperSky Race	SkyMasters
1	100	200	250
2	80	160	200
3	70	140	175
4	60	120	150
5	54	108	135
6	48	96	120
7	42	84	105
8	36	72	90
9	30	60	75
10	26	52	65
11	22	44	55
12	18	36	45
13	16	32	40
14	14	28	35
15	12	24	30
16	10	20	25
17	8	16	20
18	6	12	15
19	4	8	10
20	2	4	5

=== The 52-week ranking ===
The 52-week rolling ranking is a ranking based on results over the last 52 weeks. It includes the points earned in MRSWS and Skyrunner National Series and is updated every week. After 52 weeks, any result completely disappears.

=== End of season bonus pool ===
The end of season bonus pool increased from €66,000 in 2018 to €75,000 in 2019, split equally between the top 10 ranked male and female athletes of the season. To be eligible for the end of season bonus pool, athletes must participate in a minimum of four races, at least two must be Sky Races and start at the SkyMasters race.

== 2019 Race Calendar ==
Date	Race	Country
21.04.2019	Mt. Awa Skyrace 33 km, 2,400m+	Japan
04.05.2019	Yading Skyrun 32 km, 2,819m+	China
11.05.2019	Transvulcania Ultramarathon 74 km, 4,350m+ / *SuperSky Race	Spain
19.05.2019	Skyrace Des Matheysins 27km, 1,980m+	France
01.06.2019	Madeira Skyrace 56 km, 4,100m+	Portugal
15.06.2019	Livigno Skymarathon 34 km, 2,700m+ / *SuperSky Race	Italy
29.06.2019	Olympus Marathon 44 km, 3,200m+	Greece
14.07.2019	BUFF Epic Trail 42K 42 km, 3,325m+ / *SuperSky Race	Spain
21.07.2019	Royal Ultra Skymarathon Gran Paradiso 55 km, 4,141m+	Italy
28.07.2019	Skyrace Comapedrosa 21 km, 2,280m+	Andorra
03.08.2019	Tromsø Skyrace 57 km, 4,700m+	Norway
23.08.2019	Matterhorn Ultraks «Extreme» 24 km, 2,800m+ / *SuperSky Race	Switzerland
15.09.2019	ZacUP Skyrace 27 km, 2,650m+	Italy
22.09.2019	Pirin Ultra Skyrace 66km, 4,400m+	Bulgaria
05.10.2019	Sky Pirineu 37 km, 2,575m+	Spain
19.10.2019	The SkyMasters 27 km, 2,600m+	Italy

== 2018 Ranking system ==
For the 2018 season, three rankings were published: Sky Classic, Sky Extra and Overall.

Sky Classic races were 22 km to 50 km long with 7.5% average elevation and a 1,000m difference of min/max. altitude. The Sky Classic ranking took into account the best five results of the season. The Sky Classic category champions were Pascal Egli from Switzerland and GBs Holly Page.

Sky Extra mixed races that were formerly known as Sky Ultra and Sky Extreme. These races were over 50 km long with 6.5% average elevation and 1,000m difference of min/max. altitude. The Sky Extra took into account the best four results of the season and was won by Pere Aurell of Spain and America's Hillary Gerardi.

Overall - all athletes scoring points in any race entered the overall ranking. Their best two results in each category counted for the final ranking.

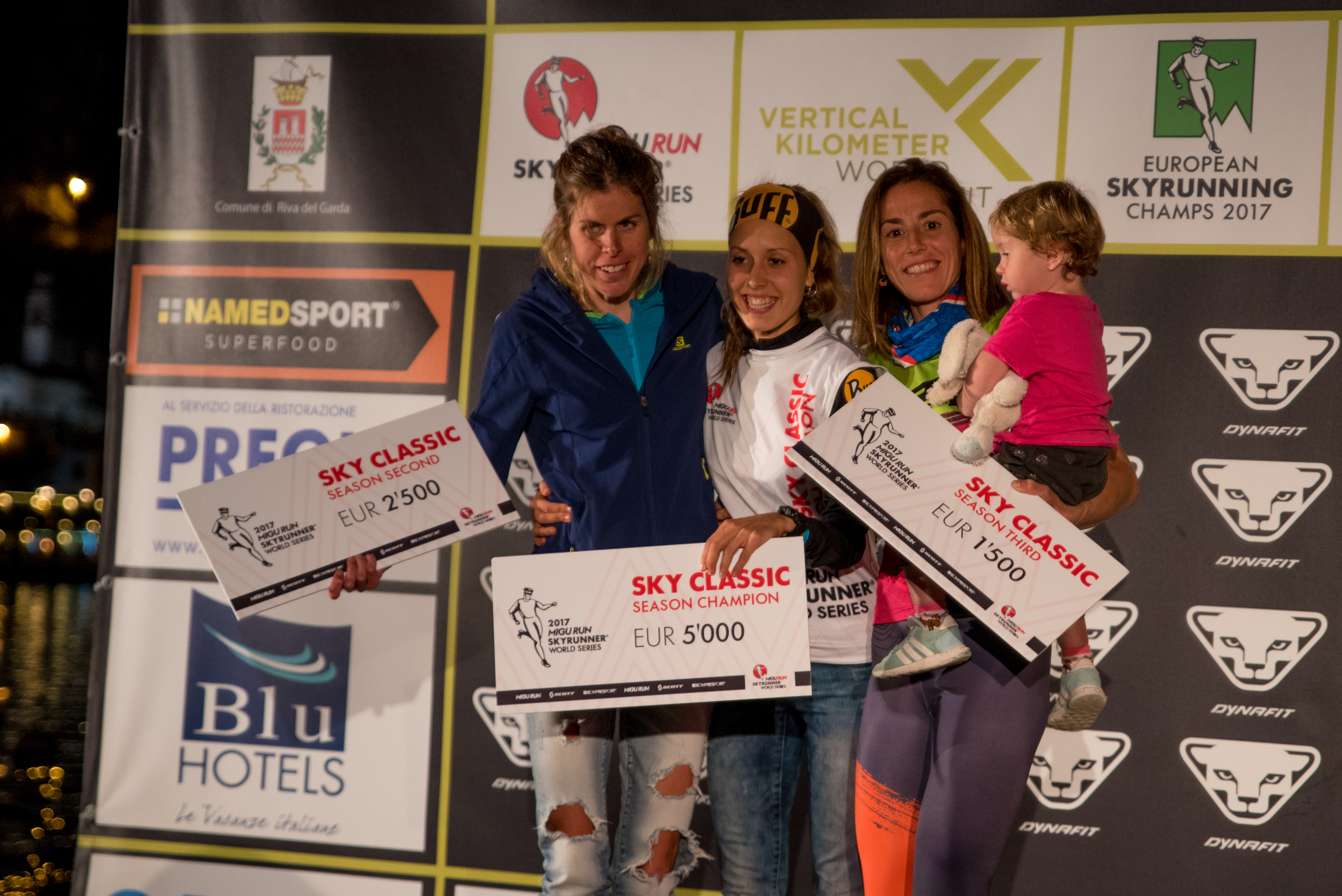
Laura Orgué (2nd), Sheila Aviles (champion) and Ragna Debats (3rd) on the podium of the Sky Classic 2017 Skyrunner World Series.

== Previous overall champions ==
That is the results of the singles races of the various years.

Year	Men's winner	Women's winner
2002	(Spain) Agustí Roc Amador	(France) Corinne Favre
2003	(Spain) Agustí Roc Amador	(Spain) Teresa Forn
2004	(Spain) Agustí Roc Amador	(Spain) Anna Serra
2005	(United Kingdom) Rob Jebb	(France) Corinne Favre
2006	(Mexico) Ricardo Mejia	(United Kingdom) Angela Mudge
2007	(Spain) Kílian Jornet	(United Kingdom) Angela Mudge
2008	(Spain) Kílian Jornet	(France) Corinne Favre
2009	(Spain) Kílian Jornet	(Italy) Emanuela Brizio
2010	(Spain) Tofol Castañer	(Italy) Emanuela Brizio
2011	(Spain) Luis Alberto Hernando	(Spain) Oihana Kortazar
2012	(Spain) Kílian Jornet	(Sweden) Emelie Forsberg
2017	(United Kingdom) Jonathan Albon	(Spain) Maite Maiora
2018	(Spain) Kílian Jornet	(Netherlands) Ragna Debats
2022	(Spain) Nicolas Molina	(Canada) Lindsay Webster

== Past events champions ==
	SkyRace		Sky Ultra		Vertical Kilometer		Sky Extreme	
Year	Men's winner	Women's winner	Men's winner	Women's winner	Men's winner	Women's winner	Men's winner	Women's winner
2012	(Spain) Luis Hernando	(Russia) Zhanna Vokueva	(Spain) Kílian Jornet	(Spain) Núria Picas	(Italy) Urban Zemmer	(Spain) Laura Orgué		
2013	(Spain) Kílian Jornet	(United States) Stevie Kremer	(Spain) Kílian Jornet	(Sweden) Emelie Forsberg	(Italy) Urban Zemmer	(Spain) Laura Orgué		
2014	(Spain) Kílian Jornet	(United States) Stevie Kremer	(Spain) Kílian Jornet	(Sweden) Emelie Forsberg	(Spain) Kílian Jornet	(Spain) Laura Orgué		
2015	(Italy) Tadei Pivk	(Spain) Laura Orgue	(Spain) Luis Hernando	(Sweden) Emelie Forsberg	(Switzerland) Remi Bonnet	(Spain) Laura Orgué		
2016	(Italy) Tadei Pivk	(United States) Megan Kimmel	(Spain) Cristofer Clemente	(Spain) Gemma Arenas	(Italy) Philip Götsch	(France) Christel Dewalle	(United Kingdom) Jonathan Albon	(United Kingdom) Jasmin Paris
2017	(Italy) Marco De Gasperi	(Spain) Sheila Aviles	(Spain) Luis Hernando	(Netherlands) Ragna Debats	Vertical Kilometer World Circuit		(United Kingdom) Jonathan Albon	(Spain) Maite Maiora

== Races ==
Races of 2018 Skyrunner World Series
Bonus races (100% 2007-2008, 20% from 2009 to 2017, 50% 2018)

category	Race	Country	02	03	04	05	06	07	08	09	10	11	12	13	14	15	16	17	18
Sky Classic	Yading Skyrun	China															x	x	x
Sky Classic	Zegama-Aizkorri	Spain			x	x	x	x		x	x	x		x	x		x	x	x
Sky Classic	Livigno SkyMarathon	Italy															x	x	x
Sky Classic	Olympus Marathon	Greece																x	x
Sky Classic	Buff Epic Trail	Spain																x	x
Sky Classic	Dolomites SkyRace	Italy			x	x	x	x				x	x		x	x	x	x	x
Sky Classic	SkyRace Comapedrosa	Andorra															x	x	x
Sky Classic	Matterhorn Ultraks	Switzerland												x	x	x	x	x	x
Sky Classic	The Rut 28K	USA														x	x	x	x
Sky Classic	Limone SkyRace	Italy												x	x	x	x	x	x
Sky Extra	Transvulcania Ultramarathon	Spain											x	x	x	x	x	x	x
Sky Extra	Ultra SkyMarathon Madeira	Portugal															x	x	x
Sky Extra	High Trail Vanoise	France															x	x	x
Sky Extra	Tromsø SkyRace	Norway														x	x	x	x
Sky Extra	Trofeo Kima	Italy	x										x		x		x		x
Sky Extra	Salomon Glen Coe Skyline	UK															x	x	x
Sky Extra	Ultra Pirineu	Spain														x	x	x	x
Sky Extra	Pirin Ultra SkyRace	Bulgaria																	x
SkyRace	X-Marathon de la Val d'Aran	Spain	x																
SkyRace	Barr Trail Mountain Race	USA	x	x															
SkyRace	Ville d'Aoste SkyRace	Italy	x																
SkyRace	Sierre-Zinal	Switzerland	x	x					x		x	x			x				
SkyRace	Kinabalu Climbathon	Malaysia	x	x	x	x	x	x	x	x	x								
SkyRace	Valmalenco-Valposchiavo	Switzerland			x	x	x		x	x									
SkyRace	6000D SkyRace	France			x	x													
SkyRace	Sentiero delle Grigne	Italy				x	x		x		x	x							
SkyRace	OSJ Ontake SkyRace	Japan					x	x	x	x	x	x							
SkyRace	SkyRace Andorra	Andorra					x	x	x	x									
SkyRace	Ben Nevis Race	UK							x	x	x								
SkyRace	Circuito dos 3 Cântaros	Portugal							x	x	x								
SkyRace	SkyRace de Serre Chevalier	France							x										
SkyRace	Giir di Mont	Italy							x	x									
SkyRace	Irazú SkyRace	Costa Rica								x									
SkyRace	SkyRace Mexiquense	Mexico							x	x									
SkyRace	Avila SkyRace	Venezuela								x	x								
SkyRace	Puyada Oturia	Spain								x									
SkyRace	Travessa de Canilllo	Andorra									x	x							
SkyRace	Carrera La Sagra	Spain									x								
SkyRace	Ziria SkyRace	Greece										x	x						
SkyRace	Snowdon Race	UK										x	x						
SkyRace	Sorginen Lasterketa	Spain										x							
SkyRace	Elbrus Race	Russia											x						
SkyRace	Ronda dels Cims	Andorra												x					
SkyRace	Lantau 2 Peaks	Hong Kong														x			
SkyRace	Ring of Steall SkyRace	UK																x	
SkyMarathon	Sentiero 4 Luglio SkyMarathon	Italy		x				x											
SkyMarathon	Maraton Alpino Madrileno	Spain		x					x										
SkyMarathon	Cervinia SkyMarathon	Italy		x															
SkyMarathon	Pikes Peak Marathon	USA			x	x			x	x	x	x		x					
SkyMarathon	Marató de Muntanya de Berga	Spain						x	x										
SkyMarathon	Monte Rosa SkyMarathon	Italy								x									
SkyMarathon	Chaberton Marathon	France								x	x								
SkyMarathon	Red Rock SkyMarathon	Italy									x								
SkyMarathon	SkyMarathon Ribagorza Románica	Spain										x							
SkyMarathon	Marathon du Montcalm	France										x	x						
SkyMarathon	Mont Blanc Marathon	France												x		x			
Sky Ultra	UltraTrail de Mexico	Mexico					x												
Sky Ultra	Bettelmatt Ultra Trail	Italy										x							
Sky Ultra	Speedgoat	USA											x	x	x				
Sky Ultra	Cavalls de Vent	Spain											x						
Sky Ultra	Gran Trail des Templiers	France											x						
Sky Ultra	Ice Trail Tarentaise	France												x	x				
Sky Ultra	Ultra Race of Champions	USA												x					
Sky Ultra	The Rut 50K	USA													x	x	x	x	
Sky Ultra	Scenic Trail	Switzerland																x	
Sky Ultra	Devil’s Ridge Ultra	China																x	
Sky Ultra	Salomon Ben Nevis Ultra	UK																x	
Sky Ultra	Royal Ultra Sky Marathon	Italy																x	
Vertical	Kilomètre Vertical de Val d’Isère	France	x	x											x	x	x		
Vertical	Kilomètre Vertical Arles/Tech	France										x							
Vertical	Elbrus Vertical Kilometer	Russia									x		x	x					
Vertical	Gerania Vertical Kilometer	Greece											x	x					
Vertical	Dolomites Vertical Kilometer	Italy											x		x	x	x		
Vertical	Kilomètre vertical de Fully	Switzerland											x						
Vertical	Vertical Kilometer del Puig Campana	Spain											x						
Vertical	Cara Amon Vertical	Spain												x					
Vertical	Chamonix Kilomètre Vertical	France												x					
Vertical	Limone Extreme Vertical Kilometer	Italy												x	x	x	x		
Vertical	Transvulcania Vertical	Spain													x		x		
Vertical	Lone Peak Vertical	USA													x	x	x		
Vertical	Tromsø Vertical Kilometer	Norway														x	x		
Vertical	Santa Caterina Vertical Kilometer	Italy															x		

== Races multiple winners ==
=== Men ===
Rank	Athlete	Wins
1	(Spain) Kílian Jornet Burgada	34
2	(Spain) Luis Alberto Hernando	10
2	(Italy) Marco De Gasperi	10
4	(Mexico) Ricardo Mejía	7
5	(Spain) Agustí Roc Amador	6
5	(Italy) Urban Zemmer	6
7	(Switzerland) Remi Bonnet	5
8	(Nepal) Bhim Gurung	4
8	(Italy) Fulvio Dapit	4
8	(United Kingdom) Jonathan Albon	4
8	(Italy) Philip Goetsch	4
8	(United Kingdom) Rob Jebb	4
8	(Norway) Stian Angermund	4
8	(Italy) Tadei Pivk	4
15	(Spain) Aires Sousa	3
15	(United States) Matt Carpenter	3
15	(United Kingdom) Tom Owens	3

=== Women ===
Rank	Athlete	Wins
1	(Spain) Laura Orgué	17
2	(Sweden) Emelie Forsberg	16
3	(France) Corinne Favre	15
4	(Italy) Emanuela Brizio	13
5	(United Kingdom) Angela Mudge	9
5	(United States) Megan Kimmel	9
7	(France) Christel Dewalle	8
8	(Spain) Maite Maiora	7
9	(New Zealand) Anna Frost	6
9	(Czech Republic) Anna Pichrtová	6
9	(United States) Stevie Kremer	6
12	(Andorra) Stéphanie Jiménez	5
12	(Sweden) Ida Nilsson	5
14	(Spain) Mireia Miró Varela	4
14	(Spain) Nuria Picas	4
14	(Portugal) Rosa Madureira	4
17	(Italy) Elisa Desco	3
17	(Italy) Francesca Canepa	3
17	(Spain) Oihana Kortazar	3
17	(Netherlands) Ragna Debats	3
17	(Japan) Yasuko Nomura	3

== See also ==
- Vertical Kilometer World Circuit
