= Emanuela Brizio =

Italian female sky runner

Personal information
- Nicknames: Manu; Aquila rosa (Pink eagle); L'aquila di Aurano
- Nationality: Italian
- Born: 10 September 1968 (age 57) Verbania
- Home town: Aurano

Sport
- Country: Italy
- Sport: Ski mountaineering Skyrunning
- Event: Mountain running
- Club: Valetudo Skyrunning Italia

Achievements and titles
- World finals: 2 World cup: 2009 Overall; 2010 Overall
Medal record
Skyrunning
World Championships
Bronze medal – third place	2010 Premana	SkyMarathon
European Championships
Silver medal – second place	2011 Poschiavo	SkyRace

Emanuela Brizio (born 10 September 1968) is an Italian female sky runner who won two Skyrunning World Cups (2009, 2010).

== Biography ==
She started with mountain running in 1999 at the age of 31. She is nicknamed Aquila di Aurano (Aurano's Eagle), and her achievements include two World Cups (Skyrunner World Series) and 10 national titles at individual level.

== Achievements ==
Year	Competition	Venue	Position	Event	Time	notes
2010	World Championships	(Italy) Premana	3rd	SkyMarathon	3:58:19	

== World Cup wins ==
#	Season	Date	Race	Discipline
1	2004	13 June	Valposchiavo-Valmalenco	SkyRace
2	2004	4 July	Sentiero 4 Luglio SkyRace	SkyRace
3	2005	12 June	Valmalenco-Valposchiavo	SkyRace
4	2008	21 September	Sentiero delle Grigne	SkyRace
5	2009	18 April	Irazú SkyRace	SkyRace
6	2009	24 May	Maratòn Alpina Zegama-Aizkorri	SkyRace
7	2009	28 June	SkyRace Andorra	SkyRace
8	2009	24 October	Mount Kinabalu Climbathon	SkyRace
9	2009	12 July	Monte Rosa SkyMarathon	Sky Marathon
10	2010	16 May	Maratòn Alpina Zegama-Aizkorri	SkyRace
11	2010	22 August	Red Rock SkyMarathon	Sky Marathon
12	2011	17 July	Bettelmatt Ultra Trail	SkyRace
13	2011	18 September	Sentiero delle Grigne	SkyRace

== National titles ==
- Italian Skyrunning Championships
  - Overall: 2006, 2007, 2008, 2010 (4)
  - SkyRace: 2011, 2014, 2015 (3)
  - SkyMarathon: 2011, 2015 (2)
  - Ultra SkyMarathon: 2013 (1)

== Wins ==
- Sentiero 4 Luglio SkyMarathon
  - Half marathon: 2003
  - Marathon: 2004, 2005, 2009, 2011, 2012, 2014, 2015 (7)

== Other results ==
- 2003:
  - 1st, Mezzalama Skyrace
- 2004:
  - 1st, Zegama-Aizkorri, Spain
  - 1st, Valposchiavo-Valmalenco, Italy
- 2005:
  - 1st, Valmalenco-Valposchiavo, Spain
- 2009:
  - 1st, Irazú SkyRace, Costa Rica
  - 1st, Maratòn Alpina Zegama-Aizkorri, Spain
  - 1st, Vallnord SkyRace, Andorra
  - 1st, Mount Kinabalu Climbathon, Malaysia
- 2010:
  - 1st Trofeo Kima
