= Christel Dewalle =

French runner

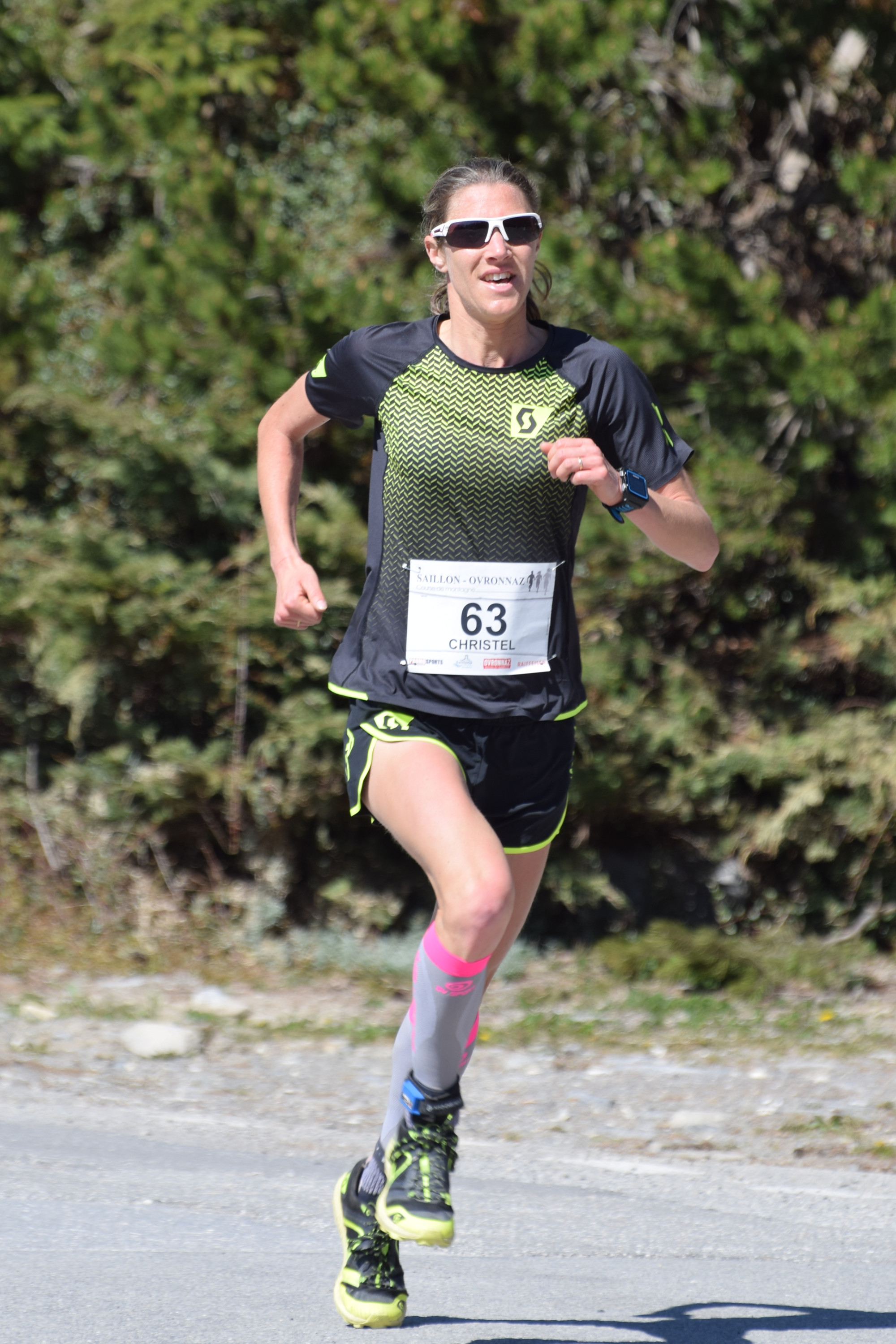

Personal information
- Nationality: French
- Born: 3 July 1983 (age 42) Annemasse
- Home town: Cornier dans le Faucigny
- Height: 1.65 m (5 ft 5 in)

Sport
- Country: France
- Sport: Skyrunning
- Event: Vertical Kilometer
- Club: AS Saint-Julien 74

Achievements and titles
- World finals: 1 Skyrunning World Cup: Vertical Kilometer (2016)
Medal record
World Championships
Silver medal – second place	2014 Chamonix	Vertical Kilometer
European Championships
Gold medal – first place	2016 Limone	Vertical Kilometer

Christel Dewalle (born 3 July 1983) is a French female sky runner who claimed second place in the Vertical Kilometer at the 2014 Skyrunning World Championships.

== World Cup wins ==
Race of Skyrunner World Series (8 wins)
Race of Vertical Kilometer World Circuit (4 wins)

#	Season	Date	Race	Discipline
1	2012	20 October	(Switzerland) Kilomètre Vertical de Fully	Vertical
2	2013	28 June	(France) Chamonix Kilomètre Vertical	Vertical
3	2014	11 July	(France) Val d'Isère Vertical Kilometer	Vertical
4	2015	17 July	(Italy) Dolomites Vertical Kilometer	Vertical
5	2015	15 October	(Italy) Limone Extreme Vertical Kilometer	Vertical
6	2016	14 October	(Italy) Limone Extreme Vertical Kilometer	Vertical
7	2016	24 June	(Italy) Santa Caterina Vertical Kilometer	Vertical
8	2016	8 July	(France) Kilomètre Vertical Face de Bellevarde	Vertical
9	2017	1 October	(France) Verticale du Grand Serre	Vertical
10	2017	6 October	(Portugal) Pico Mountain VK	Vertical
11	2017	13 October	(Italy) Grèste de la Mughera Vertical Kilometer	Vertical
12	2017	21 October	(Switzerland) Kilomètre Vertical de Fully	Vertical
