= Ricardo Mejía =

Mexican long-distance runner

Personal information
- Full name: Ricardo Mejía Hernández
- Nationality: Mexican
- Born: 24 April 1963 (age 63)
- Height: 1.59
- Weight: 56 kl

Sport
- Country: Mexico
- Sport: Sky running
- Club: Corre Mejia

Achievements and titles
- World finals: 1 Skyrunning World Cup: Overall (2006)

Ricardo Mejía Hernández (born 24 April 1963) is a Mexican long-distance runner. He was champion of the Skyrunner World Series in 2006 after winning four of the five races in which he participated. In 2009 he placed first in the Irazú SkyRace in Costa Rica.

== World Cup wins ==
#	Season	Date	Race	Discipline
1	2005	June 12	Valmalenco-Valposchiavo	SkyRace
2	2005	October 1	Mount Kinabalu Climbathon	SkyRace
3	2006	May 7	UltraTrail de Mexico	Sky Ultra
4	2006	May 28	Maratòn Alpina Zegama-Aizkorri	SkyRace
5	2006	September 3	SkyRace Andorra	SkyRace
6	2006	September 30	Mount Kinabalu Climbathon	SkyRace
7	2009	April 18	Irazú SkyRace	SkyRace
