= Fulvio Dapit =

Italian male sky runner

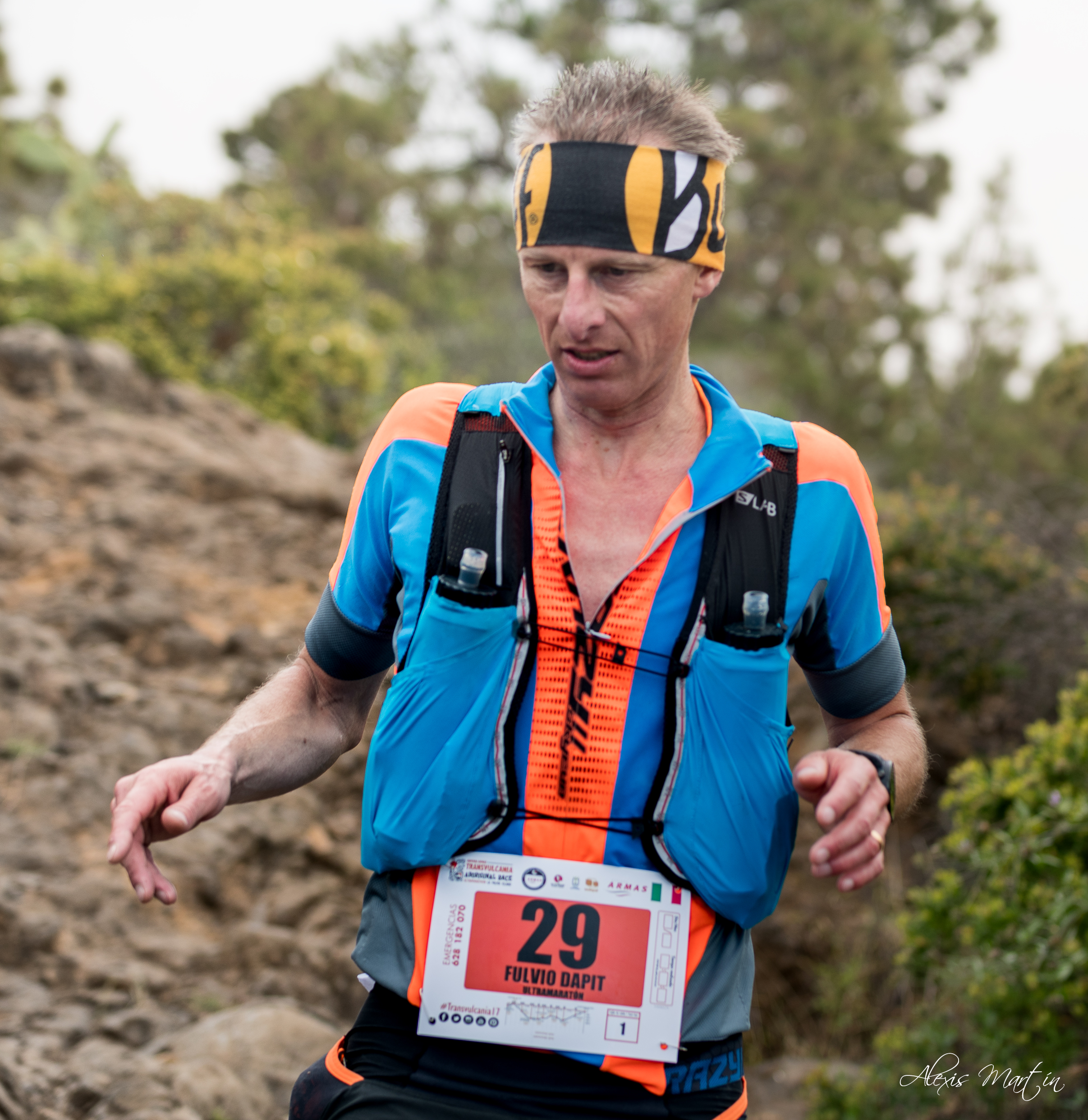
- Fulvio Dapit at 2017 Transvulcania.

Personal information
- Nationality: Italian
- Born: 13 September 1975 (age 50) Gemona

Sport
- Country: Italy
- Sport: Skyrunning
- Club: Unione Sportiva Aldo Moro

Fulvio Dapit (born 13 September 1975) is an Italian male sky runner, who won four races of the Skyrunner World Series.

== World Cup wins ==
#	Season	Date	Race	Discipline
1	2004	1 August	Dolomites SkyRace	SkyRace
2	2005	21 August	Pikes Peak Marathon	Sky Marathon
3	2006	25 June	OSJ Ontake SkyRace	SkyRace
4	2009	12 July	Monte Rosa SkyMarathon	Sky Marathon

== National titles ==
- Italian Skyrunning Championships
  - Overall: 2007
  - Sky Ultra: 2015

== See also ==
- Skyrunner World Series - Multiple winners
