= Michael Mamleev =

Italian orienteering competitor and skyrunner

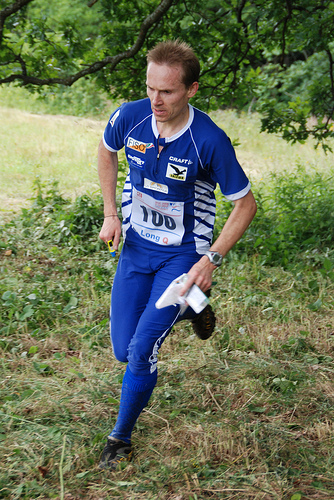
- Mamleev at WOC 2008

Medal record

Men's orienteering

Representing Russia until 2006

Representing Italy since 2006

World Championships
Silver medal – second place	2004 Västerås	Relay
Bronze medal – third place	2009 Miskolc	Long

World Cup
Silver medal – second place	2002	WC Overall

European Championships
Gold medal – first place	2002 Sümeg	Middle

Nordic Championships
Silver medal – second place	2001 Mikkeli	Middle
Silver medal – second place	2003 Flen	Long

Junior World Championships
Gold medal – first place	1994 Gdynia	Relay
Silver medal – second place	1995 Horsens	Classic
Bronze medal – third place	1995 Horsens	Short

Michael Mamleev (also known as Mikhail Mamlejev, born 4 September 1975) is an Italian orienteer and sky runner. Former Russian, now naturalised Italian.

== Championships ==
=== For Russia ===
- European Orienteering Championships 2002: a gold medal in the middle distance.
- World Orienteering Championships 2004 in Västerås, Sweden: a member of the Russian team that received a silver medal in the relay.

=== For Italy ===
- World Orienteering Championships 2006: finished 12th in the long distance, 8th in the middle distance, 13th with the Italian relay team.
- World championships 2007: 8th in the long distance, 8th in the sprint, 12th in the relay event with the Italian team.
- World championships 2009: First Italian medal on World Orienteering Championships: 3rd in the long distance.

=== National titles ===
- Italian Skyrunning Championships 2011: SkyRace

== Personal life ==
In spring of 2004 Mamleev married Sabine Rottensteiner from Italy and moved to this country to live there permanently. Right from the start he was clear about his intentions of getting Italian citizenship, in which he was also strongly supported by the Italian Orienteering Federation. In July 2006, this mission was brought to a successful end and Mamleev got the Italian passport just in time to be able to take part at the World Championships in Denmark in August 2006.
