= Maite Maiora =

Spanish athletics competitor

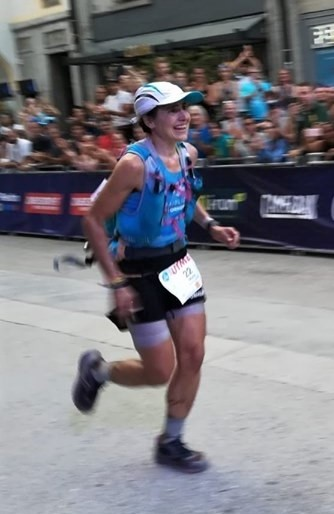

Personal information
- Full name: Maite Maiora Elizondo
- Nationality: Spanish
- Born: 20 June 1980 (age 46) Mendaro

Sport
- Country: Spain
- Sport: Skyrunning; Trail running
Medal record
Skyrunning
World Championships
Gold medal – first place	2016 Lleida	SkyMarathon
Silver medal – second place	2016 Lleida	Vertical Kilometer
European Championships
Bronze medal – third place	2015 Chamonix	Vertical Kilometer
Trail running
World Championships
Bronze medal – third place	2015 Annecy	Individual

Maite Maiora Elizondo (born 20 June 1980) is a Spanish female sky runner and trail runner, who won gold medal at the 2016 Skyrunning World Championships in SkyMarathon, the final ranking of Sky Extreme and overall title of the 2017 Skyrunner World Series and bronze medal at the 2015 IAU Trail World Championships held in Annecy.

== Biography ==
In skyrunning she won also silver medal at the 2016 Skyrunning World Championships in Vertical Kilometer, bronze medal in Vertical Kilometer at the 2015 Skyrunning European Championships held in Chamonix.

== 2017 SWS Victory ==
Overall race by race.

#	Date	Race	Venue	Category	Points
1	2 May	Yading Skyrun	(China) Yading, Sichuan	SKy Classic	-
2	13 May	Transvulcania Ultramarathon (75 km)	(Spain) La Palma Canary Islands	SKy Ultra	-
3	28 May	Maratòn Alpina Zegama-Aizkorri	(Spain) Zegama, Basque Country	SKy Classic	120
4	3 June	Ultra SkyMarathon Madeira (55 km)	(Portugal) Madeira	SKy Ultra	-
5	9 June	Scenic Trail (113 km)	(Switzerland) Lugano	SKy Ultra	-
6	18 June	Livigno SkyMarathon	(Italy) Livigno	SKy Classic	100
7	24 June	Olympus Marathon	(Greece) Dion	SKy Classic	-
8	8 July	Buff Epic Trail	(Spain) Barruera	SKy Classic	-
9	8 July	High Trail Vanoise (68 km)	(France) Val d’Isère	SKy Ultra	-
10	16 July	Royal Gran Paradiso	(Italy) Ceresole Reale	SKy Extreme	100
11	22 July	Dolomites SkyRace	(Italy) Canazei	SKy Classic	-
12	30 July	SkyRace Comapedrosa	(Andorra) Arinsal, La Massana	SKy Classic	-
13	5 August	Tromsø SkyRace	(Norway) Tromsø	SKy Extreme	120
14	26 August	Matterhorn Ultraks	(Switzerland) Zermatt	SKy Classic	-
15	2 September	The Rut 25K	(United States) Big Sky, Montana	SKy Classic	-
16	3 September	The Rut 50K (50 km)	(United States) Big Sky, Montana	SKy Ultra	-
17	9 September	Devil’s Ridge Ultra (80 km)	(China) Gobi Desert	SKy Ultra	-
18	16 September	Salomon Ring of Steall Skyrace	(United Kingdom) Kinlochleven	SKy Classic	62
19	16 September	Salomon Ben Nevis Ultra (110 km)	(United Kingdom) Kinlochleven	SKy Ultra	-
20	17 September	Salomon Glen Coe Skyline	(United Kingdom) Kinlochleven	SKy Extreme	-
21	23 September	Ultra Pirineu (110 km)	(Spain) Bagà	SKy Ultra	100
22	14 October	Limone SkyRace	(Italy) Limone sul Garda	SKy Classic	50.4
Points total (with two scraps)					540
