= Teresa Forn =

Spanish long-distance runner

Medal record

Mountain running
Gold medal – first place	2003 Skyrunner World Series	Champion of the year

Teresa Forn Munné (born 1959) from Barcelona is a Catalan long-distance runner. She was champion of the Skyrunner World Series in 2003.
