= Limone Extreme =

Skyrunning competition

- Date: October
- Location: (Italy) Limone sul Garda
- Event type: SkyRace; Vertical kilometer
- Distance: 29 km / 2,500 m 3.7 km / 1,080 m
- Established: 2011
- Website: Limone Extreme

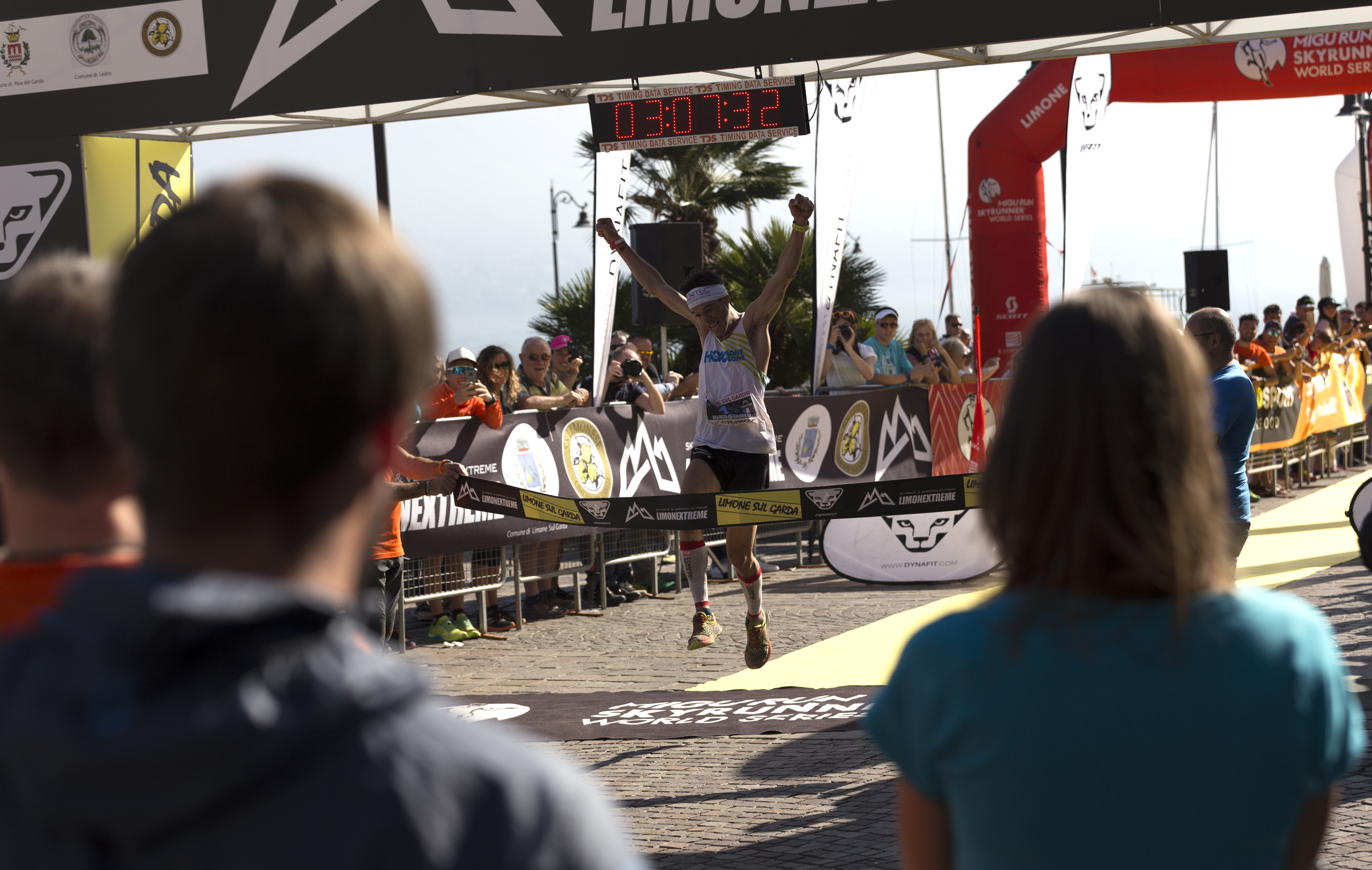
The victorious arrival of Marco De Gasperi at the 2017 edition of Limone Extreme Skyrace.

The Limone Extreme is an international skyrunning competition held for the first time in 2011. It runs every year in Limone sul Garda (Italy) in October and consists of two races SkyRace and Vertical Kilometer both valid for the Skyrunner World Series.

== Limone Extreme SkyRace ==
Year	Distance	Date	Men's winner	Time	Women's winner	Time
2011	23.5 km	17 October	(Italy) Daniele Cappelletti	2:16:41	(Italy) Cinzia Bertasa	3:06:41
2012	23.5 km	21 October	(Italy) Marco De Gasperi	2:13:34	(Italy) Debora Cardone	3:02:08
2013	23.5 km	13 October	(Spain) Kilian Jornet	2:17:03	(United States) Stevie Kremer	2:46:11
2014	24.5 km	11 October	(Eritrea) Petro Mamu	2:14:25	(Spain) Maite Maiora	2:47:05
2015	24.3 km	17 October	(Switzerland) Rémi Bonnet	2:45:25	(Spain) Laura Orgué	3:18:50
2016	27.4 km	15 October	(France) Alexis Sévennec	2:46:49	(United States) Megan Kimmel	3:17:35
2017	29 km	14 October	(Italy) Marco De Gasperi	3:07:32	(Sweden) Tove Alexandersson	3:31:11
2018	29 km	13 October	(Italy) Davide Magnini	2:59:24	(Sweden) Tove Alexandersson	3:31:36

== Limone Extreme Vertical Kilometer ==
Year	Distance/Climb	Date	Men's winner	Time	Women's winner	Time
2012	3.08 km/1080 m	19 October	(Italy) Damiano Lenzi	41:10	(Italy) Laura Gaddo	56:30
2013	3.08 km/1080 m	11 October	(Italy) Urban Zemmer	37:10	(Spain) Laura Orgué	46:10
2014	3.08 km/1080 m	10 October	(Spain) Kilian Jornet	37:27	(France) Christel Dewalle	44:51
2015	3.08 km/1080 m	15 October	(Switzerland) Rémi Bonnet	43:51	(France) Christel Dewalle	54:48
2016	3.08 km/1080 m	14 October	(Italy) Philip Götsch	43:19	(France) Christel Dewalle	50:00
2017	3.08 km/1080 m	13 October	(Italy) Philip Götsch	36:23	(France) Christel Dewalle	45:52
2018		12 October	(Switzerland) Rémi Bonnet	36:02	(Switzerland) Judith Wyder	43:47

== See also ==
- Skyrunner World Series
