= Trofeo Kima =

International skyrunning competition

- Date: August
- Location: (Italy) Val Masino
- Event type: SkyRace
- Distance: 52 km / 4200 m
- Established: 1995
- Website: trofeokima.org

The Trofeo Kima (Kima Trophy), is an international skyrunning competition held for the first time in 1995. It runs every year (till 2007), in Val Masino (Italy) in August and is valid for the Skyrunner World Series in the Sky Extreme category.

From 2008 Kima became a biennial race.

== History ==
Since 1995, along the Sentiero Roma, runs the Trofeo Kima, a high altitude marathon considered one of the most demanding of the skyrunning world panorama. The trophy is dedicated to the memory of Pierangelo Marchetti "Kima", the mountain guide of Valtellina, who died in 1994 during a rescue mission.

The route takes place on a distance of 50 kilometers with more than 3800 meters of altitude difference. The winners take the entire route, counter-clockwise, starting and arriving at Filorera, in about 6 hours and 30 minutes.

== Editions ==
Sky Extreme characteristics: 52 km and 4,200 m climbing.

Race of Skyrunner World Series

Year	Edition	1st		2nd		3rd	
1995	1st	Fabio Meraldi	6.29.41	Adriano Greco	6.35.02	Cheto Biavaschi	6.35.18
1995	1st	Alexia Zuberer & Bruna Fanetti	8.34.02			Daniela Gilardi	10.66.33
1996	2nd	Cheto Biavaschi	6.26.12	Fulvio Mazzocchi	6.28.27	Adriano Greco	6.38.51
1996	2nd	Morena Paieri	8.31.26	Daniela Gilardi	8.39.26	Augusta Redaelli	11.06.51
1997	3rd	Mauro Gatta	6.08.15	Fabio Meraldi & Fulvio Mazzocchi	6.18.20		
1997	3rd	Morena Paieri	8.12.29	Gisella Bendotti	8.54.04	Alexia Zuberer	9.22.22
1998	4th	Mauro Gatta	5.49.10	Fabio Meraldi	5.49.46	Fulvio Mazzocchi	6.07.18
1998	4th	Morena Paieri	7.50.41	Gloriana Pellisier	8.20.15	Corinne Favre	8.27.31
1999	5th	Mauro Gatta	6.20.27	Cheto Biavaschi	6.22.40	Giovanni Gianola	6.24.08
1999	5th	Morena Paieri	7.52.53	Teresa Roca I Casas	8.11.44	Gloriana Pellisier	8.24.06
2000	6th	Mario Poletti & Fabio Meraldi	6.00.13			Bruno Brunod	6.10.17
2000	6th	Gloriana Pellisier	7.48.27	Emma Roca Rodriguez	8.37.05	Michela Benzoni	8.42.45
2001	7th	Carlo Bellati	6.04.56	Fabio Meraldi	6.07.07	Gianmarco Bagini	6.19.39
2001	7th	Michela Benzoni	8.18.36	Giovanna Cavalli	8.53.36		
2002	8th	Giovanni Gianola	6.14.05	Riccardo Mejia	6.19.37	Bruno Brunod	6.22.03
2002	8th	Corinne Favre	7.52.31	Gloriana Pellissier	8.04.39	Emma Roca Rodriguez	8.15.53
2003	9th	Mario Poletti & Camillo Vescovi	6.14.12			Cheto Bivaschi	6.35.32
2003	9th	Maria Giovanna Cerutti	8.08.59	Esther Hernandez	8.19.03	Giovanna Cavalli	8.41.57
2004	10th	Mario Poletti	6.21.23	Giovanni Marco Bagini	6.27.28	Dario Songini	6.35.04
2004	10th	Corinne Favre	8.14.14	Roser Espanol	8.29.33	Giovanna Cavalli	8.35.56
2005 *	11th	Mario Poletti	1.53.46	Giovanni Bagini	1.53.49	Fausto Rizzi	1.54.31
2005 *	11th	Sara Rigoni	2.19.39	Roser Espanol	2.21.23	Giovanna Cavalli	2.24.29
2006 *	12th	Carlo Belatti	1.35.20	Dino Melzani	1.35.22	Fabio Bonfanti	1.35.24
2006 *	12th	Corinne Favre	1.48.38	Emanuela Brizio	1.57.23	Federica Boifava	2.08.17
2007 *	13th	Paolo Gotti	3.00.54	Dino Melzani	3.01.22	Franco Sancassani	3.01.52
2007 *	13th	Corinne Favre	3.41.27	Federica Boifava	3.55.53	Sara Rigoni	4.02.22
2008	14th	Paolo Gotti	6.43.29	Fabio Bonfanti	6.53.57	Dino Sala	6.55.19
2008	14th	Emanuela Brizio	7.59.08	Carolina Tiraboschi	8.47.18	Federica Boifava	9.56.25
2010	15th	Kilian Jornet	6.19.03	Miguel Heras	6.29.52	Nicola Golinelli	6.32.50
2010	15th	Emanuela Brizio	7.46.37	Carolina Tiraboschi	7.55.09	Cinzia Bertasa	8.58.08
2012	16th	Kilian Jornet	6.28.52	Tom Owens	6.39.28	Franco Sancassani	6.45.36
2012	16th	Nuria Picas	7.36.21	Emelie Forsberg	7.47.06	Emanuela Brizio	7.47.21
2014	17th	Kilian Jornet	6.12.20	Manuel Merillas	6.28.33	Franco Sancassani	6.38.14
2014	17th	Kasie Enman	7.53.42	Emelie Forsberg	8.22.13	Emanuela Brizio	8.30.52
2016	18th	Bhim Gurung	6.10.44	Marco De Gasperi	6.12.09	Leo Viret	6.13.19
2016	18th	Emelie Forsberg	7.49.06	Ruth Croft	8.06.45	Emanuela Brizio	8.21.42
2018	19th	Kilian Jornet	6.09.19	Alexis Sévennec	6.11.59	Pere Aurell	6.20.50
2018	19th	Hillary Gerardi	7.37.29	Robyn Owen	7.39.01	Mira Rai	7.41.46
2020	20th	Cancelled due to COVID-19					
2022	21st	Finlay Wild	6.10.14	Alexis Sévennec	6.22.35	Stian Angermund	6.22.35
2022	21st	Hillary Gerardi	7.30.38	Marcela Vasinova	7.58.35	Karina Carsiolo	8.02.03
2024	22nd	Finlay Wild	6.05.04	Jack Kuenzle	6.08.15	Cristian Minoggio	6.11.36
2024	22nd	Hillary Gerardi	7.32.58	Elise Poncet	7.35.20	Henriette Albon	7.40.02
2026	23rd	William Boffelli	6.07.43	Mattia Bertoncini	6.12.38	Federico Nicolini	6.17.04
2026	23rd	Hillary Gerardi	7.25.54	Lucille Germain	7.32.04	Roberta Jacquin	7.54.42

Legend: * = Short course

== See also ==
- Skyrunner World Series
