= Agustí Roc =

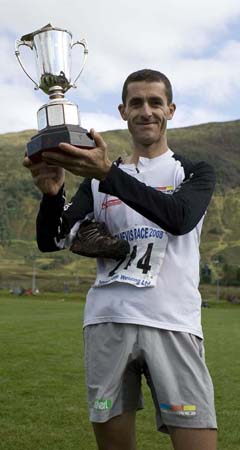
- Agustí Roc Amador, holding aloft the trophy after winning the 2008 Ben Nevis Race, part of the Buff Skyrunner World Series

Personal information
- Full name: Agustí Roc
- Nationality: Spanish
- Born: Agustí Roc Amador; 28 August 1971 (age 54) Molins de Rei, Spain

Sport
- Country: Spain
- Sport: Skyrunning; Ski mountaineer
Medal record
Ski mountaineering
European Championships
Gold medal – first place	2005 Andorra	Vertical race
Silver medal – second place	2007 Avoriaz	Vertical race
Mountain running
Skyrunner World Series
Gold medal – first place	2003	Champion of the year
Gold medal – first place	2004	Champion of the year

Agustí Roc Amador (born 28 August 1971) is a Spanish ski mountaineer and long-distance runner. He is a three-time champion of the Skyrunner World Series from 2002 to 2004, European vertical race champion in 2005, and Spanish vertical race champion from 2005 to 2007.

== Selected results ==
=== Ski mountaineering ===
- 2004:
  - 4th, World Championship relay race, together with Javier Martín de Villa, Dani León Roca, and Manuel Pérez Brunicardi
- 2005:
  - 1st, European Championship vertical race
  - 1st, Spanish Championship vertical race
  - 2nd, Spanish Cup
  - 2nd, Spanish Championship single race
- 2006:
  - 1st, Spanish Championship vertical race
  - 3rd, Spanish Championship single race
  - 4th, World Championship vertical race
  - 6th, World Championship relay race, together with Javier Martín de Villa, Federico Galera Díez, and Manuel Pérez Brunicardi
- 2007:
  - 1st, Spanish Championship vertical race
  - 2nd, European Championship vertical race
  - 4th, European Championship relay race, together with Javier Martín de Villa, Marc Solá Pastoret, and Manuel Pérez Brunicardi
- 2008:
  - 6th, World Championship vertical race

=== Mountain running/skyrunning ===
- 2002: Skyrunner World Series champion
- 2003: Skyrunner World Series champion
  - 1st, Maraton Alpino Madrileno, Spain
- 2004: Skyrunner World Series champion
- 2006:
  - 1st, Dolomites SkyRace, Italy
- 2008:
  - 1st, Mount Kinabalu Climbathon, Malaysia
  - 1st, Ben Nevis Race, Fort William, Scotland
- 2009:
  - 7th, Skyrunner World Series

==== World Cup wins ====
#	Season	Date	Race	Discipline
1	2002	7 July	X-Marathon de la Val d'Aran	SkyRace
2	2002	6 October	Mount Kinabalu International Climbathon	SkyRace
3	2003	15 June	Maraton Alpino Madrileno	Sky Marathon
4	2006	23 July	Dolomites SkyRace	SkyRace
5	2008	24 August	Mount Kinabalu Climbathon	SkyRace
6	2008	6 September	Ben Nevis Race	SkyRace
