= Anna Serra =

Medal record

Mountain running

Skyrunner World Series
| Gold medal – first place | 2004 | Champion of the year |

Anna Serra Salamé (born 1968 in Barcelona) is a Catalan long-distance runner from Alt Urgell. She was champion of the Skyrunner World Series in 2004.
