= ZacUP Skyrace del Grignone =

Annual mountain running competition

- Date: September
- Location: (Italy) Grigna
- Event type: SkyRace
- Distance: 27.5 km / 2,650 m
- Established: 2013
- Website: ZacUP Skyrace del Grignone

The ZacUP Skyrace del Grignone (also known as Sentiero delle Grigne), is an international skyrunning competition held for the first time in 2013. It runs every year along the mountain path of the Grigna (Italy) in September.

Previously this race, for eleven editions from 2002 to 2012, was called the Sentiero delle Grigne (43km / 3,200m D +), and was the race of the Skyrunner World Series circuit. ZacUP is the heir, shorter and less demanding, still keeping the spirit of the previous, so much to award the Trofeo Scaccabarozzi (the full name of the race was in fact the Trofeo Scaccabarozzi-Sentiero delle Grigne) to transit on the Grand Prize of mountain in the summit of the Grigna (2410 m).

== ZacUP Skyrace del Grignone ==
Year	Date	Men's winner	Women's winner
2013	22 September	(Italy) Franco Sancassani	(Italy) Chiara Gianola
2014	21 September	(Italy) Marco De Gasperi	(Italy) Elisa Desco
2015	20 September	(Italy) Daniel Antonioli	(Italy) Debora Cardone
2016	18 September	(Italy) Daniel Antonioli	(Romania) Denisa Dragomir
2017	17 September	(Italy) Daniel Antonioli	(Romania) Denisa Dragomir
2018	16 September	(Rwanda) Jean Baptiste Simukeka	(Rwanda) Primitive Niyirora

== Sentiero delle Grigne ==
Race of Skyrunner World Series

Year	Category	1st		2nd		3rd	
2002	Men	(Italy) Massimo Colombo	5.07.46	(Italy) Gian Marco Bagini	5.09.25	(Italy) Mario Poletti	5.18.03
2002	Women	(Italy) Corinne Favre	5.56.06	(Italy) Francesca Bentivoglio	6.24.38	(Italy) Giovanna Cavalli	6.31.57
2003	Men	(Italy) Mario Poletti	5.03.39	(Italy) Massimo Colombo	5.08.24	(Italy) Fabio Bonfanti	5.08.26
2003	Women	(Italy) Maria Giovanna Cerutti	6.21.58	(Italy) Giovanna Cavalli	6.30.37	(Italy) Maria Poletti	6.59.10
2004	Men	(Italy) Mario Poletti	5.02.03	(Italy) Fabio Bonfanti	5.05.49	(Italy) Fulvio Dapit	5.15.37
2004	Women	(France) Corinne Favre	6.09.50	(Italy) Giovanna Cavalli	6.45.39	(Italy) Maria Poletti	7.06.31
2005	Men (28km)	(Italy) Dennis Brunod	2.44.09	(United Kingdom) Simon Booth	2.44.19	(Italy) Marco Rusconi	2.44.36
2005	Women (28km)	(France) Corinne Favre	3.23.19	(Italy) Daniela Vassalli	3.25.47	(Italy) Emanuela Brizio	3.26.05
2006	Men (28km)	(Italy) Massimo Colombo	2.48.05	(Italy) Marco Rusconi	2.49.01	(Italy) Fausto Rizzi	2.50.53
2006	2006 Women (28km)	(Italy) Daniela Gilardi	3.25.42	(Spain) EsterHernandez	3.27.55	(Andorra) Stephanie Jimenez	3.29.18
2007	Men	(Spain) Kilian Jornet	4.43.54	(Slovenia) Mitja Kosovelj	5.00.10	(Italy) Fabio Bonfanti	5.09.23
2007	Women	(France) Corinne Favre	5.58.07	(Italy) Emanuela Brizio	6.09.50	(Italy) Daniela Gilardi	6.28.57
2008	Men	(Spain) Kilian Jornet	4.44.40	(Spain) Jessed Hernandez Gispert	4.44.41	(Spain) Tofol Castanyer Bernat	4.56.45
2008	Women	(Italy) Emanuela Brizio	5.32.01	(France) Corinne Favre	5.45.45	(United Kingdom) Angela Mudge	5.50.59
2010	Men	(Spain) Miguel Heras	4.48.24	(Italy) Tadei Pivk	4.56.45	(Italy) Nicola Golinelli	4.59.06
2010	Women	(Spain) Mireia Miro Varela	5.32.44	(Spain) Nuria Picas Alberts	5.50.22	(Italy) Emanuela Brizio	5.55.34
2011	Men (21km)	(United Kingdom) Tom Owens	2.23.54	(Italy) Stefano Butti	2.24.13	(Spain) Luis Alberto Hernando Alzaga	2.24.31
2011	Women	(Italy) Emanuela Brizio	2.57.52	(Spain) Oihana Kortazar	2.59.13	(Spain) Nuria Dominquez Azpeceta	3.05.23
2012	Men	(Italy) Tadei Pivk	4.45.38	(Spain) Miguel Heras	4.47.19	(United Kingdom) Tom Owens	4.51.00
2012	Women	(Italy) Silvia Serafini	5.54.39	(Italy) Emanuela Brizio	6.03.22	(Italy) Debora Cardone	6.19.43

== See also ==
- Skyrunner World Series
