= Elbrus Race =

- Date: May
- Location: (Russia) Mount Elbrus
- Event type: SkyRace; SkyMarathon; Vertical Kilometer
- Distance: 7.36 km / 1,862 m D+ 12.2 km / 3,342 m D+ 1,000 m D+
- Established: 2008
- Website: Elbrus Race

The Elbrus Race (or RedFox Elbrus Race), is an international skyrunning competition held for the first time in 2008. It runs each May at Mount Elbrus, Russia. which at 5,642 m is the highest mountain in Europe. The race has formed part of the Skyrunner World Series circuit four times.

== Races ==
- Elbrus SkyRace, a SkyRace (7.36 km / 1,862 m), from 3,780 m up to 5,642 m MSL
- Elbrus SkyMarathon, a SkyMarathon (12 km / 3,342 m), from 2,350 m up to 5,642 m MSL
- Elbrus Vertical, a Vertical Kilometer (1,000 m), from 2,450 m up to 3,450 m MSL

== Results ==
Race of Skyrunner World Series

Year	Vertical Kilometer		SkyRace		SkyMarathon	
Year	Men's winner	Women's winner	Men's winner	Women's winner	Men's winner	Women's winner
2008	not held		(Kyrgyzstan) Semyon Dvornichenko; 2:58:00	(Kyrgyzstan) Ekaterina Andreeva; 3:33:00	not held	
2009	not held		(Kyrgyzstan) Semen Dvornichenko; 2:43:20	(Kyrgyzstan) Ekaterina Shubina; 4:10:00	not held	
2010	(Russia) Dmitry Ploskonosov; 48:41	(United States) Megan Kimmel; 59:07	(Russia) Mikhail Klimov; 2:27:05	(United States) Megan Kimmel; 3:22:16	not held	
2011	not held					
2012	(Italy) Marco De Gasperi; 44:39	(Russia) Larisa Soboleva |56:51	(Russia) Denis Provalov; 3:17:37	(Russia) Zoya Spirina; 5:16:30	(Spain) Luis Alberto Hernando; 3:41:00	(Russia) Zhanna Vokuyeva; 5:02:00
2013	(Italy) Marco Facchinelli; 44:48	(Russia) Larisa Soboleva; 51:08	(Kazakhstan) Aggey Skopin; 2:52:42	(Russia) Varvara Prokhorova; 3:58:38	(Italy) Marco Facchinelli; 3:30:46	(Russia) Oksana Stefanishina; 4:45:01
2014	(Russia) Vitaliy Chernov; 47:22	(Russia) Elena Kravchenko; 54:22	(Belarus) Vladimir Belyay; 2:31:50	(Russia) Svetlana Malova; 3:28:05	(Italy) Marco De Gasperi; 3:03:55*	(Russia) Oksana Stefanishina; 4:32:28*
2015	(Russia) Vitaliy Chernov; 44:16	(Russia) Elena Kravchenko; 52:24	(Belarus) Vladimir Belyay; 2:49:30	(Russia) Tatyana Ufimtseva; 3:45:42	(Russia) Vitaly Shkel; 3:29:04	(Russia) Oksana Stefanishina; 4:42:00
2016	(Spain) Cardona Oriol; 45:43	(Russia) Elena Kravchenko; 54:37	(Belarus) Vladimir Belyay (Belarus) Vyacheslav Khorosavin; 3:11:06	(Russia) Marina Georgieva; 3:40:20	(Ecuador) Karl Egloff; 3:44:43	(Russia) Diana Zelenova; 4:43:17
2017	(Russia) Vitaliy Chernov; 43:14	(Russia) Elena Kravchenko; 54:00	(Mongolia) Dorjsurenkhor Otgonkhuu; 2:59:13	(Russia) Oksana Stefanishina; 2:49:40	(Ecuador) Karl Egloff; 3:24:14	(Russia) Diana Zelenova; 4:30:12

*record of the race
