= Bruno Brunod =

Italian cyclist

Personal information
- Nationality: Italian
- Born: 10 November 1962 (age 63) Aosta, Italy

Sport
- Country: Italy
- Sport: Athletics; Ski mountaineering Skyrunning
- Event: Mountain running

Achievements and titles
- World finals: 1996 Skyrunner World Series; 1st; 1998 Skyrunner World Series; 1st; 2002 Skyrunner World Series; 1st

Bruno Brunod (French: [bʁyno bʁyno]; born 10 November 1962) is an Italian former cyclist who began his career in his thirties. He is twice world champion of the Skyrunner World Series and holds numerous speed records for climbing and descending some of the highest mountains in the world, like the Matterhorn in 1995, broken only in 2013 by a professional 25 years younger than him, Kílian Jornet Burgada. As of 2016 his speed records for the Monte Rosa in 1997 and the Aconcagua in Argentina in 2000 remained unbroken. Brunod produces results like a professional athlete, but has retained the spirit and humility of an amateur, for which he is widely admired, especially amongst fellow mountain runners.

== Biography ==
Brunod grew up in the Aosta Valley. When he was 16 years old, a tourist gave him a bicycling magazine, and he began dreaming of bicycle racing, wanting to emulate his fellow countrymen Fausto Coppi and Gino Bartali. It was not until his military service that Brunod could afford and start bicycling. He entered an amateur team in Brianza. Thanks to his talents he was able to cycle with Claudio Chiappucci, double runner-up of Giro and Tour de France in the 1990s. Brunod left bike racing soon, moving far away from the world of doping.

He returned to his career as a mason, specialising in stone facings and roofs, and took up running in the mountains as a diversion. After 3 years of preparation, he set a record of climb and descent of the Matterhorn from Breuil-Cervinia in 1995 and continued to do so over the next 10 years. (see section "records")

In 2005, he attempted a record ascent time of Mount Everest with a project named Everest Vitesse 2005, but had to stop after about 16 hours, at camp 3 at about 8.200 metres.

In 2012 he wrote the introduction to the book Perseverare è umano by Pietro Trabucchi.

After a pause of about 7 years, dedicating himself to his family and job, he returned to running in 2013.

In 2016, his autobiography was published with a foreword by Kilian Jornet Burgada.

== Personal life ==
Brunod is married and has five children. Kilian Jornet has noted his humility and said "To me and all the rest of mountain runners, he is God".

== Records ==
- 1995 record of climb and descent of the Matterhorn from Breuil-Cervinia in 3 hours and 14 minutes "after a meticulous preparation, spanning 3 years and 34 climbs". In August 2013, Kílian Jornet Burgada broke this record improving it by 22 minutes. Brunod awaited Burgada after his descent and said to the Aosta Sera: "I expected that Kilian would beat my record, he is a professional athlete, as opposed to my times, in which this enterprise was a quasi hobby".
- 1996 Skyrunner World Series World Champion, world record in the "Vertical Kilometre" in the Val d'Isere (France) and record ascent time for Mount Elbert SkyMarathon in 1 hour and 54 minutes.
- 1997 Record for the climb and descent of Monte Rosa (4.459 metres) starting from Gressoney in 4 hours and 45 minutes, unbroken as of 2016
- 1998 Skyrunner World Series World Champion
- 2000 Record for climb and descent of Aconcagua, Argentina, in 5 hours and 57 minutes
- 2001 Record of ascending Kilimanjaro the long way via Marangu in 5 hours and 38 minutes. It was broken in 2010 by Kilian Jornet Burgada with 5 hours, 23 minutes and 50 seconds.
- 2002 winner of the Becca di Nona Skyrace in the Aosta Valley, "Alpine Sky Raid" and second place in the world circuit of Skyrunning.
- 2003 winner of the Becca di Nona Skyrace, course record on the Aosta Valley Alta Via (Haute route, "high trekking route") number 1, 120 kilometres long and over 9,000 metres of vertical descent.
- 2004 winner of the Becca di Nona Skyrace in the Aosta Valley, winner of the Canazei (Trento, Italy) race of the Vincitore della gara di Canazei "Skyrunning World Series" circuit and winner of the finals of the Buff Skyrunner World Series in Malaysia.
- 2013 Tor des Géants 36th place overall
- 2016 First 4 K Alpine Endurance Trail of Valle d'Aosta, 2nd place

== See also ==
- Fabio Meraldi

== Bibliography ==
- Brunod, Bruno (2016). Accornero, Gabriele; Masia, Luca (eds.). Skyrunner. Il corridore del cielo (in Italian). Mondadori. p. 144. ISBN 9788891810021.
