= Urban Zemmer =

Italian sky runner

Personal information
- Nationality: Italian
- Born: 4 July 1970 (age 55) Castelrotto

Sport
- Country: Italy
- Sport: Skyrunning

Achievements and titles
- World finals: 2 Skyrunning World Cup: Vertical Kilometer (2012, 2013)
Medal record
World Championships
Gold medal – first place	2010 Canazei	Vertical Kilometer
Bronze medal – third place	2014 Chamonix	Vertical Kilometer
European Championships
Gold medal – first place	2009 Canazei	Vertical Kilometer
Gold medal – first place	2011 Valencia	Vertical Kilometer
Silver medal – second place	2013 Canazei	Vertical Kilometer

Urban Zemmer (born 4 July 1970) is an Italian male sky runner, world champion in the vertical kilometer at the 2010 Skyrunning World Championships.

== Biography ==
In the specialty of the vertical kilometer he also won the European championships in 2009 and Italian championships in 2009, 2010, 2011,

== National titles ==
- Italian Vertical Kilometer Championships (FISKY version)
  - Vertical kilometer: 2011
