= SkyRace Internazionale Valmalenco Valposchiavo =

- Date: June
- Location: (Italy) Valmalenco (Switzerland) Valposchiavo
- Event type: SkyRace
- Distance: 31 km / 1,850 m D+
- Established: 2002
- Website: international-skyrace.org

The SkyRace Internazionale Valmalenco Valposchiavo was an international skyrunning competition held for the first time in 2002 and for the last time in 2013. It is held every year in June from Lanzada (Valmalenco, Italy) to Poschiavo (Switzerland) and was valid for the Skyrunner World Series.

== Editions ==
Five times the race was valid as SkyRace for the Skyrunner World Series, one of these was part of the Skyrunner World Series Trails.

Race of Skyrunner World Series
Race of Skyrunner World Series Trails

Year	Edition	Men's winner	Time	Women's winner	Time	Notes
2002	1st	(Italy) Dennis Brunod	2:46:24	(Italy) Gloriana Pellissier	3:33:19	
2003	2nd	(Mexico) Ricardo Mejia	3:18:34	(Italy) Gisella Bendotti	4:22:50	
2004	3rd	(Italy) Dennis Brunod	2:44:00	(Italy) Manuela Brizio	3:24:00	
2005	4th	(Mexico) Ricardo Mejia	2:34:39	(Italy) Manuela Brizio	3:20:33	
2006	5th	(Germany) Helmut Schissel	2:41:10	(United Kingdom) Angela Mudge	3:10:18	REC women
2007	6th	(Italy) Marco De Gasperi	2:32:03	(Italy) Pierangela Baronchelli	3:21:07	REC men
2008	7th	(Spain) Kilian Jornet Burgada	2:43:16	(United Kingdom) Angela Mudge	3:10:40	Short race
2009	8th	(Czech Republic) Robert Krupicka	1:49:54	(Czech Republic) Anna Pichrtova	2:08:35	
2010	9th	(Germany) Helmut Schissel	2:43:56	(United Kingdom) Angela Mudge	3:18:49	
2011	10th	(Czech Republic) Robert Krupicka	2:39:59	(Spain) Oihana Kortazar Aranzeta	3:18:46	
2012	11th	(Czech Republic) Robert Krupicka	1:20:40	(Italy) Emanuela Brizio	1:14:33	16 km
2013	12th	(Colombia) Saul Antonio Padua	2:07:29	(Italy) Silvia Serafini	2:39:45	26 km

== See also ==
- Skyrunner World Series
