= High Trail Vanoise =

International sky running competition

- Date: July
- Location: (France) Val d’Isère
- Event type: Ultra SkyMarathon
- Distance: 70 km / 5,400 m
- Established: 2016
- Website: High Trail Vanoise

The High Trail Vanoise is an international skyrunning competition held for the first time in 2016. It is held every year at the Val-d'Isère in the French Alps at the end of July or beginning of May. The race is part of the Skyrunner World Series.

== Races ==
- High Trail Vanoise, an Ultra SkyMarathon (70 km / 5400 m D+)
- Trail des 6 cols, a SkyMarathon (42 km / 3500 m D+)
- Kilomètre Vertical de Val d’Isère, a Vertical Kilometer (3,5 km / 1000 m D+)

== High Trail Vanoise ==
Race of Skyrunner World Series

Year	Date	Men's winner	Women's winner
2016	10 July	(France) Nicolas Martin	(France) Anne-Lise Rousset
2017	8 July	(Spain) Luis Alberto Hernando	(United States) Megan Kimmel

== Kilomètre Vertical de Val d’Isère ==
Also known as Kilomètre Vertical Face de Bellevarde, was interrupted in 2003 and rescheduled in 2014.

Race of Skyrunner World Series
Race of Vertical Kilometer World Circuit

Year	Date	Men's winner	Women's winner
2002	1 September	(Italy) Marco De Gasperi	(Italy) Antonella Confortola
2003	12 July	(Italy) Marco De Gasperi	(France) Corinne Favre
2014	11 July	(Italy) Marco Moletto	(France) Christel Dewalle
2015	10 July	(France) François Gonon	(Spain) Laura Orgué
2016	8 July	(France) Xavier Gachet	(France) Christel Dewalle
2017	7 July	(France) Xavier Gachet	(France) Jessica Pardin

== See also ==
- Skyrunner World Series
