= OSJ Ontake SkyRace =

International skyrunning competition

- Date: August
- Location: (Japan) Nagano
- Event type: SkyRace
- Distance: 32 km / 1,800 m D+
- Established: 2006
- Website: OSJ Ontake SkyRace

The OSJ Ontake SkyRace was an international skyrunning competition held for the first time in 2006 and till 2014. It ran every year in Nagano (Mount Ontake, Japan) in August. The race was valid for the Skyrunner World Series six times consecutively from 2006 to 2011.

== Races ==
- OSJ Ontake SkyRace, a SkyRace (32 km / 1,800 m D+)
- OSJ Ontake Ultra Trail, an Ultra trail (100 km)

== OSJ Ontake SkyRace ==
Race of Skyrunner World Series

Edition	Year	Date	Men's winner	Women's winner
1	2006	25 June	(Italy) Fulvio Dapit	(United Kingdom) Angela Mudge
2	2007	2 September	(Spain) Kílian Jornet Burgada	(Andorra) Stéphanie Jiménez
3	2008	31 August	(Japan) Dai Matsumoto	(Japan) Yasuko Nomura
4	2009	30 August	(Japan) Toru Miyahara	(Japan) Yasuko Nomura
5	2010	29 August	(Japan) Dai Matsumoto	(Japan) Yasuko Nomura
6	2011	29 August	(Japan) Dai Matsumoto	(Japan) Hasegawa Kanako
7	2012		[[ ]]	[[ ]]
8	2013		[[ ]]	[[ ]]
9	2014	24 August	[[ ]]	[[ ]]

== See also ==
- Skyrunner World Series
