= Lou Dalfin =

Italian folk music group

Lou Dalfin is an Italian folk and folk-rock/folk-punk group focused on preserving and modernizing the traditions of Occitania. Founded in 1982 by hurdy-gurdy master Sergio Berardo, the band combines traditional Occitan sounds with modern rock instrumentation.

== Musicians ==
- Sergio Berardo - voice, ghironda
- Dino Tron - accordion, organetto, bag pipe
- Riccardo Serra - drums
- Gianluca Dho - bass
- Enrico Gosmar - guitar
- Luca Biggio - sax
- Mario Poletti - mandolin, bouzouki

== Discography ==
- En franso i ero de grando guero (1982)
- L'aze d'alegre (1984)
- W Jan d' l'eiretto (1992)
- Gibous, Bagase e Bandí (1995)
- Radio Ousitania libra (1997)
- Lo viatge (1998)
- La flor de lo Dalfin (2001)
- Sem encar ici (2003)
- L’òste dal Diau (2004)
- L’òste dal Diau - International Version (2004)
- Al temps de festa en Occitania (DVD, 2005)
- I Virasolelhs (2007)
- Remescla (2009)
- Cavalier Faidit (2012)
- Musica Endemica (2016)
