= Mount Kinabalu International Climbathon =

Skyrunning competition in Malaysia

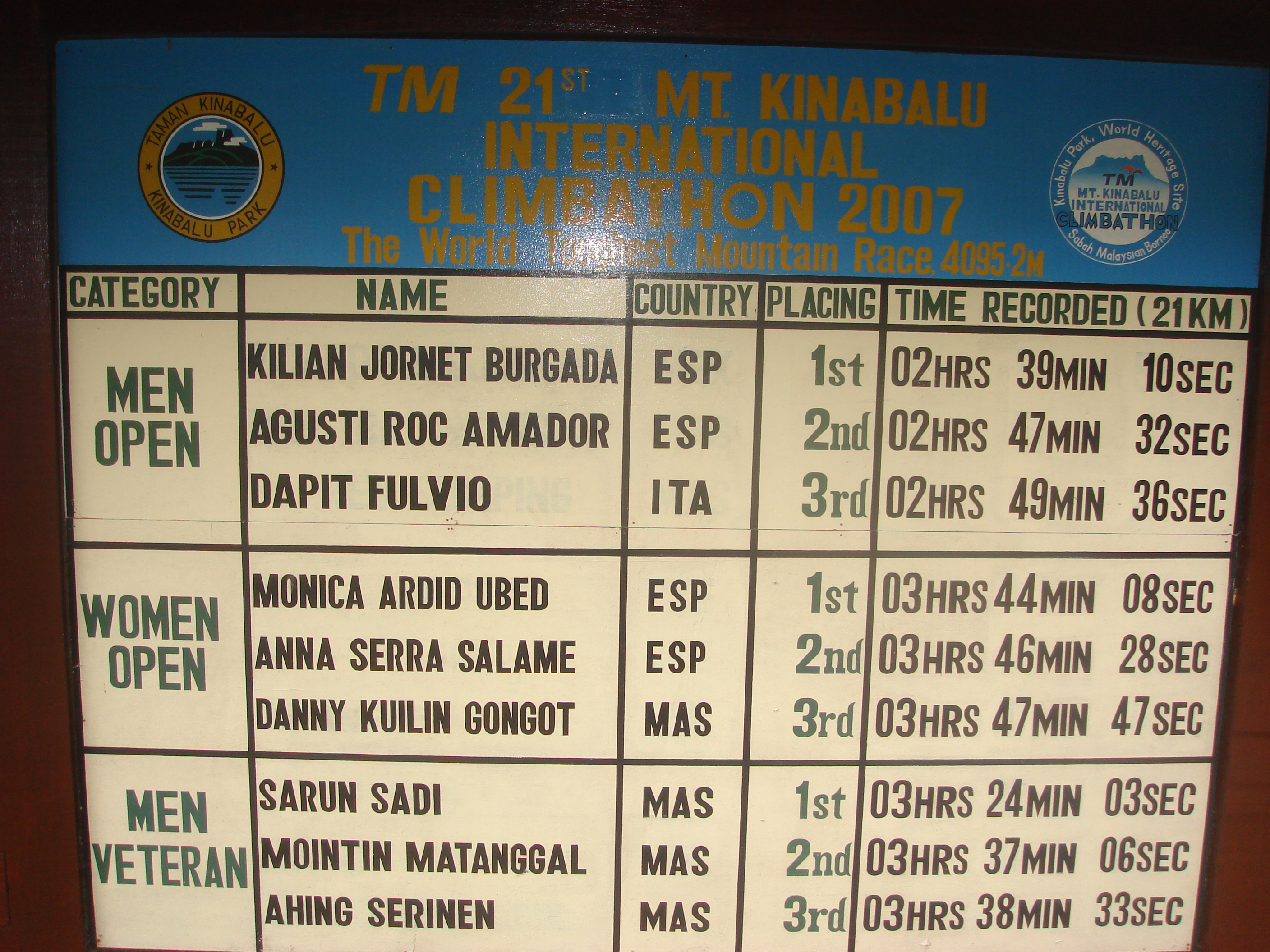
The Hall of fame of 21st Mount Kinabalu International Climbathon

The Mount Kinabalu International Climbathon is an international skyrunning competition held for the first time in 1987 (went international in 1988). It runs every year on Mount Kinabalu in Sabah, Malaysia, in October, within the Kinabalu Park, with the race part of the Skyrunner World Series until 2010.

== Background and history ==
The Kinabalu Climbathon has been held since 1987 and is well-known amongst the international mountain running community, especially since its inclusion in the annual International Skyrunning Federation (ISF) Skyrunner World Series race circuit in 2004. In its early years, the climbathon was only a fun race among the Sabah Parks staff before being expanded internationally. From 1995, the organisation was undertaken by the Sabah Tourism Board (STB) until it remained part of the Skyrunner World Series.

== Winners ==
Edition	Year	Men's winner	Women's winner	Ref.
14th	2000	(Italy) Jean Pellissier	(United Kingdom) Angela Mudge	
15th	2001	(Mexico) Ricardo Mejía	(Czech Republic) Anna Pichrtová	
16th	2002	(Spain) Agustí Roc	(Czech Republic) Anna Pichrtová	
17th	2003	(Italy) Marco De Gasperi	(Malaysia) Danny Kuilin Gongot	
18th	2004	(Italy) Bruno Brunod	(Czech Republic) Anna Pichrtová	
19th	2005	(Mexico) Ricardo Mejía	(Czech Republic) Anna Pichrtová	
20th	2006	(Mexico) Ricardo Mejía	(Czech Republic) Anna Pichrtová	
21st	2007	(Spain) Kílian Jornet	(Spain) Monica Ardid Ubed	
22nd	2008	(Spain) Agustí Roc	(France) Corinne Favre	
23rd	2009	(Spain) Kílian Jornet	(Italy) Emanuela Brizio	
24th	2010	(Italy) Marco De Gasperi	(Spain) Núria Picas	
25th	2011	(Spain) Kílian Jornet	(Malaysia) Danny Kuilin Gongot	
26th	2012	(Spain) Kílian Jornet	(Sweden) Emelie Forsberg	
27th	2013	(Malaysia) Daved Simpat	(New Zealand) Ruth Croft	
28th	2014	(Japan) Dai Matsumoto	(New Zealand) Ruth Croft	
	2015	not held		
29th	2016	(Malaysia) Safrey Sumping	(Philippines) Sandi Menchi Catlona Abahan	
30th	2017	(Malaysia) Safrey Sumping	(Philippines) Sandi Menchi Catlona Abahan	
	2018	not held		
	2019	not held		
	2020	not held		
	2021	not held		
	2022	not held		
	2023	not held		
31st	2024	(Malaysia) Walter Herman	(Philippines) Sandi Menchi Catlona Abahan	
32nd	2025	(Italy) Ghiano Gianluca	(Russia) Anastasia Yurievna Rubtsova	
33rd	2026	(Italy) Alex Oberbacher	(Spain) June Villarroel Olza	

== See also ==
- Skyrunner World Series
