= Zegama-Aizkorri =

Skyrunning competition

- Date: May
- Location: (Basque Country (autonomous community)) Zegama-Aizkorri
- Event type: SkyMarathon
- Distance: 42.195 km / 2,736 m D+
- Established: 2002
- Website: Zegama-Aizkorri

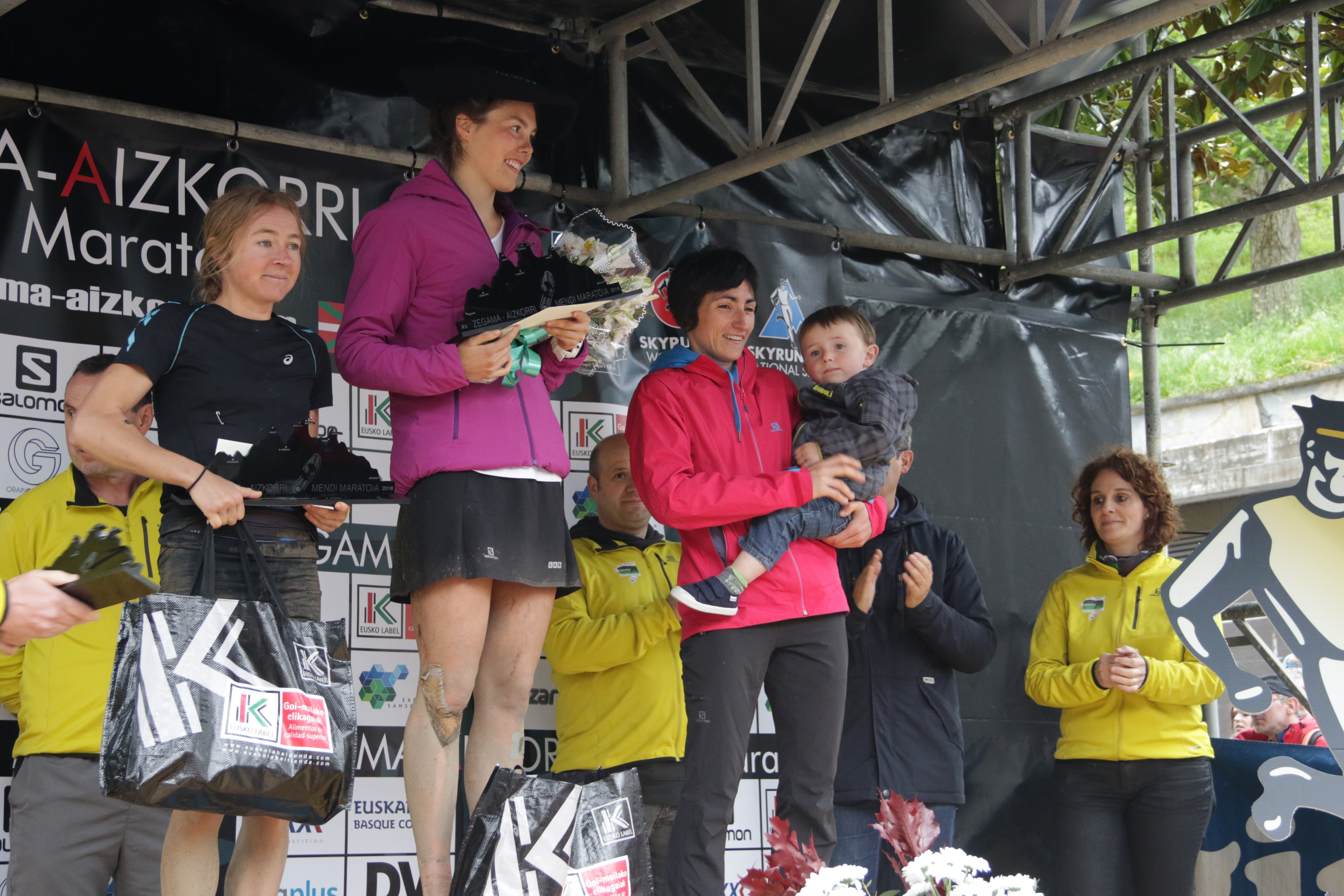
The female podium of the 2016 Zegama-Aizkorri, from left: Megan Kimmel, Yngvild Kaspersen and Oihana Kortazar.

The Zegama-Aizkorri (also known as Zegama-Aizkorri Maratoia in Basque) is an international skyrunning competition held for the first time in 2002. It runs every year in the Basque Country in May, starting from Zegama up to Aizkorri (1551 m MLS) and finishing back in Zegama. It consists of two races, a SkyMarathon (42.195 km) and (since 2015) a Vertical Kilometer. The races were part of the Skyrunner World Series up to 2017, since 2018 the marathon has been part of the Golden Trail Series.

== Winners ==
Since its debut, the Zegama-Aizkorri SkyMarathon's length has been 42.195 km.

| Edition | Year | Men | Time | Women | Time |
|---|---|---|---|---|---|
| 1st | 2002 | (Spain) Juan Martin Tolosa | 4:14.23 | (Spain) Rosa Lasagabaster | 6:05:27 |
| 2nd | 2003 | (Spain) Fernando Garcia | 4:08:44 | (Spain) Esther Hernández | 5:08:52 |
| 3rd | 2004 | (Italy) Mario Poletti | 4:06:46 | (Spain) Anna Serra | 5:27:51 |
| 4th | 2005 | (United Kingdom) Rob Jebb | 3:54:18 | (France) Corinne Favre | 5:03:57 |
| 5th | 2006 | (Mexico) Ricardo Mejia | 4:03:41 | (United Kingdom) Angela Mudge | 4:43:04 |
| 6th | 2007 | (Spain) Kilian Jornet | 3:56:59 | (France) Corinne Favre | 4:50:01 |
| 7th | 2008 | (Spain) Kilian Jornet | 3:59:33 | (France) Corinne Favre | 5:00:46 |
| 8th | 2009 | (United Kingdom) Ricky Lightfoot | 4:03:12 | (Italy) Emanuela Brizio | 4:38:19 |
| 9th | 2010 | (Spain) Kilian Jornet | 3:56:30 | (Italy) Emanuela Brizio | 4:47:51 |
| 10th | 2011 | (Spain) Kilian Jornet | 3:56:30 | (Spain) Oihana Kortazar | 4:42:50 |
| 11th | 2012 | (Spain) Kilian Jornet | 3:56:04 | (Spain) Oihana Kortazar | 4:52:50 |
| 12th | 2013 | (Spain) Kilian Jornet | 3:54:38 | (Sweden) Emelie Forsberg | 4:48:12 |
| 13th | 2014 | (Spain) Kilian Jornet | 3:48:14 | (United States) Stevie Kremer | 4:46:43 |
| 14th | 2015 | (Italy) Tadei Pivk | 3:51:11 | (Spain) Azahara Garcia | 4:41:23 |
| 15th | 2016 | (Spain) Kilian Jornet | 3:50:03 | (Norway) Yngvild Kaspersen | 4:50:58 |
| 16th | 2017 | (Norway) Stian Angermund | 3:45:08 | (Spain) Maite Maiora | 4:34:27 |
| 17th | 2018 | (Switzerland) Rémi Bonnet | 3:53:06 | (Sweden) Ida Nilsson | 4:38:38 |
| 18th | 2019 | (Spain) Kilian Jornet | 3:52:47 | (Norway) Eli Anne Dvergsdal | 4:36:06 |
| 21st** | 2022 | (Spain) Kilian Jornet | 3:36:40* | (Netherlands) Nienke Brinkman | 4:16:43 |
| 22nd | 2023 | (Spain) Manuel Merillas | 3:42:01 | (Germany) Daniela Oemus | 4:31:54 |
| 23rd | 2024 | (Spain) Kilian Jornet | 3:38:07 | (Norway) Sylvia Nordskar | 4:29:12 |
| 24rd | 2025 | (Morocco) Elhousine Elazzaoui | 3:43:28 | (Spain) Sara Alonso | 4:27:25 |
| 25th | 2026 | (Morocco) Elhousine Elazzaoui | 3:45:07 | (Sweden) Tove Alexandersson | 4:08:09* |

* Fastest time ** Edition 19 and 20 cancelled due to the COVID-19 pandemic

== See also ==
- Skyrunner World Series
