= SkyRace Comapedrosa =

International skyrunning competition held in Arinsal, Andorra

- Date: July
- Location: (Andorra) Arinsal, La Massana
- Event type: SkyRace
- Established: 2014
- Website: Skyracecomapedrosa.com

The SkyRace Comapedrosa is an international skyrunning competition held for the first time in 2014. It runs every year in Arinsal, La Massana (Andorra) in July and is a SkyRace part of the Skyrunner World Series.

Although the first edition, with its current name, of this race is of the 2014 (and from 2016 inserted in the World Cup circuit), since 2005 the SkyRace, which took place on Mount Coma Pedrosa, took place on a regular frequency every year, and almost always the race was valid for the Skyrunner World Series.

== Editions ==
Eight times the race was valid as SkyRace for the Skyrunner World Series and one as Sky UltraMarathon. On another occasion it was part of the Skyrunner World Series Trails.

Race of Skyrunner World Series
Race of Skyrunner World Series Trails

Year	Edition	Name	Distance/Climbing	Date	Men's winner	Time	Women's winner	Time	Notes
2005	1st	Cursa d'Andorra	26 km / 3000 m	4 September	(Spain) Raúl García Castán	3:41:52	(Spain) Marta Vidal López	4:32:42	
2006	2nd	SkyRace Andorra	34 km / 3000 m	3 September	(Mexico) Ricardo Mejía	4:02:01	(Spain) Ester Hernandez Casahuga	5:02:02	
2007	3rd	SkyRace Andorra	23 km / 2748 m	22 July	(Spain) Kílian Jornet Burgada	2:25:40	(United Kingdom) Angela Mudge	2:58:54	
2008	4th	SkyRace Andorra	23.7 km / 2850 m	29 June	(Spain) Kílian Jornet Burgada	2:43:29	(Spain) Rosa Madureira	3:22:15	
2009	5th	SkyRace Andorra	35 km / 2700 m	28 June	(Spain) Kílian Jornet Burgada	3:32.21	(Italy) Emanuela Brizio	4:21:31	
2010	23rd	Travessa de Canillo	12 km / 1400 m	6 June	(Spain) Sebastian Sanchez Saez	1:32:44	(New Zealand) Anna Frost	1:41:18	
2011	24th	Travessa de Canillo	23.5 / 1800 m	26 June	(Spain) Luis Alberto Hernando	2:34:48	(Spain) Laura Orgué	3:02:22	
2012	This season no racing in Andorra was valid for the Skyrunner World Series								
2013	5th	Ronda dels Cims	184 km / 12,200 m	21 June	(France) Julien Chorier	28:41:06	(Italy) Francesca Canepa	36:18:55	
2014	1st	SkyRace Comapedrosa	21 km / 2300 m	23 August	(France) Brice Delsoullier	2:58:22	(Spain) Rosa Valls	3:50:01	
2015	2nd	SkyRace Comapedrosa	21 km / 2300 m	26 July	(Spain) Pere Aurell	2:46:42	(Spain) Oihana Kortazar	3:21:15	
2016	3rd	SkyRace Comapedrosa	21 km / 2300 m	31 July	(United Kingdom) Tom Owens	2.40:02	(Spain) Laura Orgué	3:12:27	
2017	4th	SkyRace Comapedrosa	21 km / 2300 m	30 July	(Spain) Jan Margarit Solé	2:35:36	(Spain) Sheila Avilés Castaño	3:17:16	
2018	5th	SkyRace Comapedrosa	21 km / 2300 m	29 July	(Spain) Kílian Jornet Burgada	2:33:18	(Sweden) Lina El Kott Helander	3:03:07	
2019	6th	SkyRace Comapedrosa	21 km / 2300 m	28 July	(Spain) Jan Margarit Solé	2:36:32	(Spain) Sheila Avilés Castaño	3:01:38	

== See also ==
- Coma Pedrosa
- Skyrunner World Series
