= International Skyrunning Federation =

World sports governing body for skyrunning

- Abbreviation: ISF
- Formation: 2008
- Type: Federation of national associations
- Headquarters: Zermatt, Switzerland
- Region served: Worldwide
- President: Marino Giacometti
- Vice-President, Executive Director: Lauri van Houten
- Affiliations: International Climbing and Mountaineering Federation
- Website: https://www.skyrunning.com/

The International Skyrunning Federation (ISF) is the world governing body for skyrunning. As of recent data, it comprises 41 Member nations. it succeeded the federation of sports at Altitude which previously oversaw the development of regulation of skyrunning.

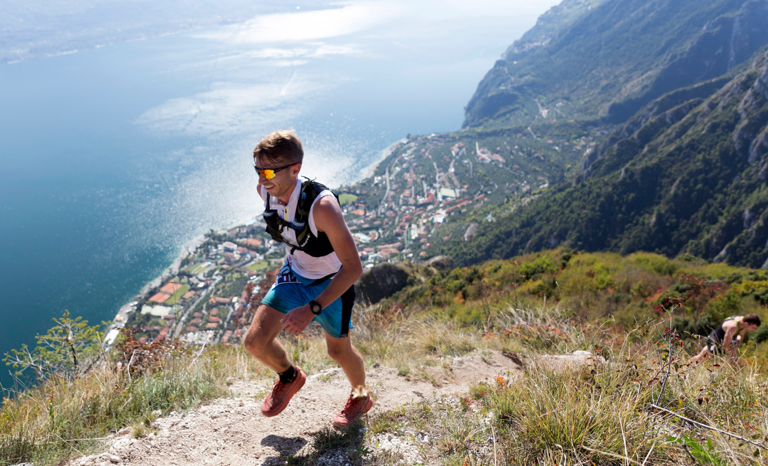
Skyrunning

== History ==
Running across varied and mountain terrain has been long practiced by athletes. However, the discipline of skyrunning is formalized and organized following the establishment of Federation for Sport at Altitude.

The Federation of Sports at Altitude was founded by Marino Giancometti who with other fellow climbers conducted high-altitude races across the world's most famous mountain ranges the Himalayas, Rockies, Mount Kenya, and the Mexican Volcanoes.^{[2]}Marino Giancometti conducted skyrunning races as part of the training for high altitude expeditions in 1992.^{[3]} Marino Giancometti formed the Federation of Sports at Altitude (FSA) in 1995.^{[4]} The Federation of Sports at Altitude (FSA) was replaced by the International Sky Running Federation in 2008.^{[5]}

Today, this organization holds more than 200 races across the world, with about 50,000 athletes from 65 countries.^{[6]} Marino Giacometti serves as the President of the International Skyrunning Federation Board and the Managing Committee.^{[7]}

The federation is also attributed to be the founding organization of the Vertical World Circuit which was formed in 2009. The Vertical World Circuit also is known as Vertical Kilometre World Circuit organizes the vertical kilometre which is a subset of the skyrunning discipline

It has the tag line of ‘Less cloud. More sky’ to inspire its members. It regulates the skyrunning disciplines, which include seven segment that are: SKY, ULTRA and VERTICAL, SKY SPEED, VERTICAL RUNNING, SKYBIKE and SKYRAID. It allows for the training courses that could occur in different environments, like in paths, trail, rocks, or snows. Furthermore, the courses should involve at least 12% of the uphill regions and 6% inclines, but the total altitude should not over 2.000 m. Furthermore, IFS regulates that the total distance should involve no more than 15% of the asphalt.

== Aims and Objectives of the Organisation ==
The Federation is responsible for the following objectives:^{[9]}

- To frame rules and ensure that it is followed in competitions in accordance with the principles laid down in the statutes and regulations.
- To frame and ensure that the rules are followed in the international competitions and the participation in such competitions is in accordance to the regulations.
- To be responsible for determining which international competitions can be officially approved and recognized.
- To be responsible for promotion and control of good sporting practices.
- To prevent doping and any other practices which go against the IOC Medical code and regulations on doping.
- To develop the sports to attain Olympic recognition status.
- To ensure that skyrunning values are maintained.
- To ensure that the rules of the local skyrunning races are in congruence with the ISFs rules.
- To coordinate the calendar of events.

== Skyrunning ==
Skyrunning is a subset of mountain running. Skyrunning is defined as running in mountains which are above 2,000 meters in altitude with an incline over 30% and the difficulty of climbing is not more than II° grade.^{[10]} Skyrunning is a relatively new sport. Despite its newness, this sport has been gaining interest in more than 65 countries.^{[11]}

In the early years of the sports, the sport was simple which included running up and down the mountain as fast as possible but, since it gained attention, the sport has become more extreme with events like the Tromso Skyrace which was held for the first time in 2014 as a result of which it is being called extreme sports.^{[12]}

The seven disciplines of skyrunning are sky, ultra, vertical, skyspeed, skyscraper racing/vertical running, skybike, and skyraid; each of these disciplines vary in distance and altitude.^{[13]} Skyrunning is also of a shorter duration compared to ultrarunning, sometimes shorter than a half marathon.^{[14]} The major factor which differentiates skyrunning from other kinds of running is the altitude. The mountain terrain, elevation and distance are the other defining features of skyrunning.^{[15]} Skyrunning is also held indoors using stairs with an incline of over 45% and the International Skyrunning Federation is working on an IOC recognition to the indoor skyscraper racing. Vertical races serve as a special type of skyrunning that include indoor activities. It requires on the over 45% inclines. It provide good environment for specialists to measure the impacts of skyrunning and conduct easy observation.

Skyrunning is quite popular in the global domain. Races for skyrunning have been accept by 36 countries worldwide, and the number of skyrunners reaches 600,000 in the global domain. In particular, there are 75,000 entrants in the 2015. Currently, this sports activity is still male dominant in the global domain, with 80% of the skyrunners being males. However, the ages are quite diverse, ranging from 18 to 83 years old. However, most of the runners are between the age of 25 and 44. The top three countries with the highest number of skyrunners are Europe, the United States, and Japan.

In 2019, the International Skyrunning Federation (ISF) introduced the North American Skyrunning Championships under its SKY discipline. The initiative involved collaboration with American ultrarunner Matt Carpenter and Nancy Hobbs, director of the American Trail Running Association. Carpenter is regarded as a prominent figure in skyrunning in the United States. Since 2011, local championship events organized with their involvement have attracted more than 300 participants annually from Europe and North America. The collaboration aimed to expand the federation's presence in the United States.

== Skyrunning for New Learners ==
Skyrunning could be undertaken by anyone who can run and show interests. Although it requires the skills and nerves, one could start with some places that could allow for trainings. For those who expect to have mountain adventures, the choice for starting an intensive course might be a starting point. The places selected should consider the heights and also weather matters since it will affect the duration, the time, and risks for skyrunning. Besides, develop the skills of map checking is essential, as those training courses cannot support for this kill. Usually, runners should try for local navigation camp and orienteering club that would allow them to learn from experts. To prepare for skyrunning, one should at least involve a pair of outsole which can resist wet soils and hard rocks and have the right size to make the food comfort during the long journey. Furthermore, a backpack might be useful to prepare some simple food, water, and other relevant stuff like windproof jacket with taped seams and trousers, a rescue blanket, a phone, a hat, as well as gloves.

Skyrunning also calls for some techniques. Although those experienced runners usually have faster speed and stronger duration, they are quite wise in controlling the speed and be careful in developing the strategy for their speeds. For instance, experience runners intend to be slower in uphill trails, but faster in downhill trails. They usually develop specific gestures to make the move more flexible and cost less energy. The upper bodies are usually relaxed to maintain balance, and repeated practices are required for one to develop strong skills for skyrunning.

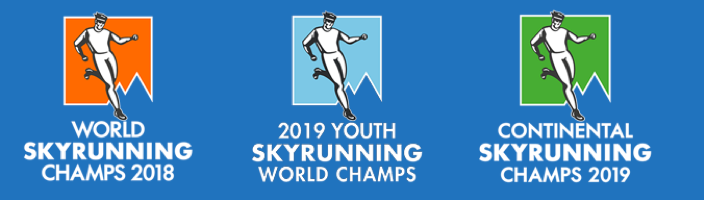
World Championships of IFS

== World Championships ==
The world championships of the skyrunning are biannually skyrunning competitions (only the 2nd edition was held after 4 years), organised for the first time in 2010 by ISF. The Federation conducts Skyrunner World Series every year. The 2018 World Series was held in Kinlochleven, Scotland from 13–15 September 2018. The races were judged on vertical, ultra and sky criterion. The International Skyrunning Federation has recently introduced National Series and Continental Championships. In 2016, the Youth Skyrunning World Championships were introduced.^{[17]}In 2018, 18 countries participated in the Youth Skyrunning World Championship and eleven countries won medals.^{[18]} The 2019 Youth Skyrunning World Championships will be held on 2 and 4 August 2019 in Italy.^{[19]}

In 2004, the Migu Run Skyrunner was introduced. The 2019 Migu Run Skyrunner World Series will be held across countries like Japan, China, Spain, France, Greece, Italy, Norway, Bulgaria and Andorra from April to October 2019.^{[20]}

Apart from these championships, the Federation also conducts the European Championships and the World Series. The federation has taken the sports to new territories and introduced new challenges in the last few years. The federation has recently announced the Skyrunning Continental Championships called as The Skyrunning Oceans Championships which was held at The Buffalo Stampede, Australia in April 2019.^{[21]}

Each year, the Federation puts up these events on the calendar of its website attracting people from all over the world.^{[22]}

== Scientific Research ==
The federation has coordinated with Milan University to conduct scientific studies from 2007 to 2010 on Vertical Sprint races in Milan. The findings of the studies have indicated that skyrunning is ideal for weight loss as 80% of the energy consumed diverts the mass upwards and it has ruled out health risks associated with stair climbing.

Studies reveal that such enduring and extreme running on mountains also bring the health benefits such as low energy costs for those runners. Although there are individual differences, those frequent mountain running could develop much slower energy cost system that could be 14% lower than average individuals. As a type of mountain race, sky running could allow for the strong development in the physical competence, like the prolonged running time, faster speed, and other competitive aspects that will allow an individual to improve their ability in cope with dangers and get survival in some extreme situations. The most important changes in the physical status for different types of mountain runners, including sky runners, is the heart rates. Runners intend to develop stronger physical system with the heart rate stable enough to cope with the extreme situations. that could extend runners’ adaptation to the competition intensity of the races. Heart can be strengthened with improvement in cardiac biomarkers, electro- and echocardiography. Another discovery is that skyrunning will challenge people's physical status for long duration and distance and professional skyrunners usually develop low body mass index and low body fat. Although there are gender differences in the improvement in physical status with women is less strong than male in those indexes, the gender differences are narrowing for those men and women who have participated in those long-distance or long-duration activity.

Despite the healthy benefits, sky running actually face with potential health risks due to its nature of extreme sports. It usually incurs some problems like overuse injuries, which is due to the repetitive activities that lead to the macro-trauma. According to Balendran, Sørlie, and Engebretsen (2019), those sky runners usually report high prevalence of overuse injuries. The questionnaire survey indicates 19% of the overuse injuries among the participants, and 8% of substantial overuse injuries. Sometimes without proper protection, runners might face with broken limbs, abrasions, and some contusions. Actually, ISF has listed seven fatalities during the events of skyrunning, which include one head injury, one hypothermia, and five heart failures. Accordingly, it is essential for those runners to conduct some pre-test to ensure that their body could adapt to the extreme sports. Besides, those who have tried the long-duration running usually face with digest problems and they might also suffer more respiratory infections.

== See also ==
- Skyrunning World Championships
- Skyrunner World Series
- Vertical Kilometer World Circuit
- Towerrunning World Association
- Skyrunning European Championships
- SkySnow Asia-Pacific Championships
