= 2017 Skyrunner World Series =

Winners
- Sky Classic: (Italy) Marco De Gasperi (Spain) Sheila Aviles
- Sky Ultra: (Spain) Luis Hernando (Netherlands) Ragna Debats
- Sky Extreme: (United Kingdom) Jonathan Albon (Spain) Maite Maiora
- Overall: (United Kingdom) Jonathan Albon (Spain) Maite Maiora

Competitions
- Venues: 19 venues
- Individual: 22 events

The 2017 Skyrunner World Series was the 16th edition of the global skyrunning competition, Skyrunner World Series, organised by the International Skyrunning Federation from 2002.

In this edition is deleted the Vertical Kilometer title, but returns the overall title (absent from 2012).

== Sky Classic ==
Bonus races (20% extra points)
2017 Limone Extreme SkyRace

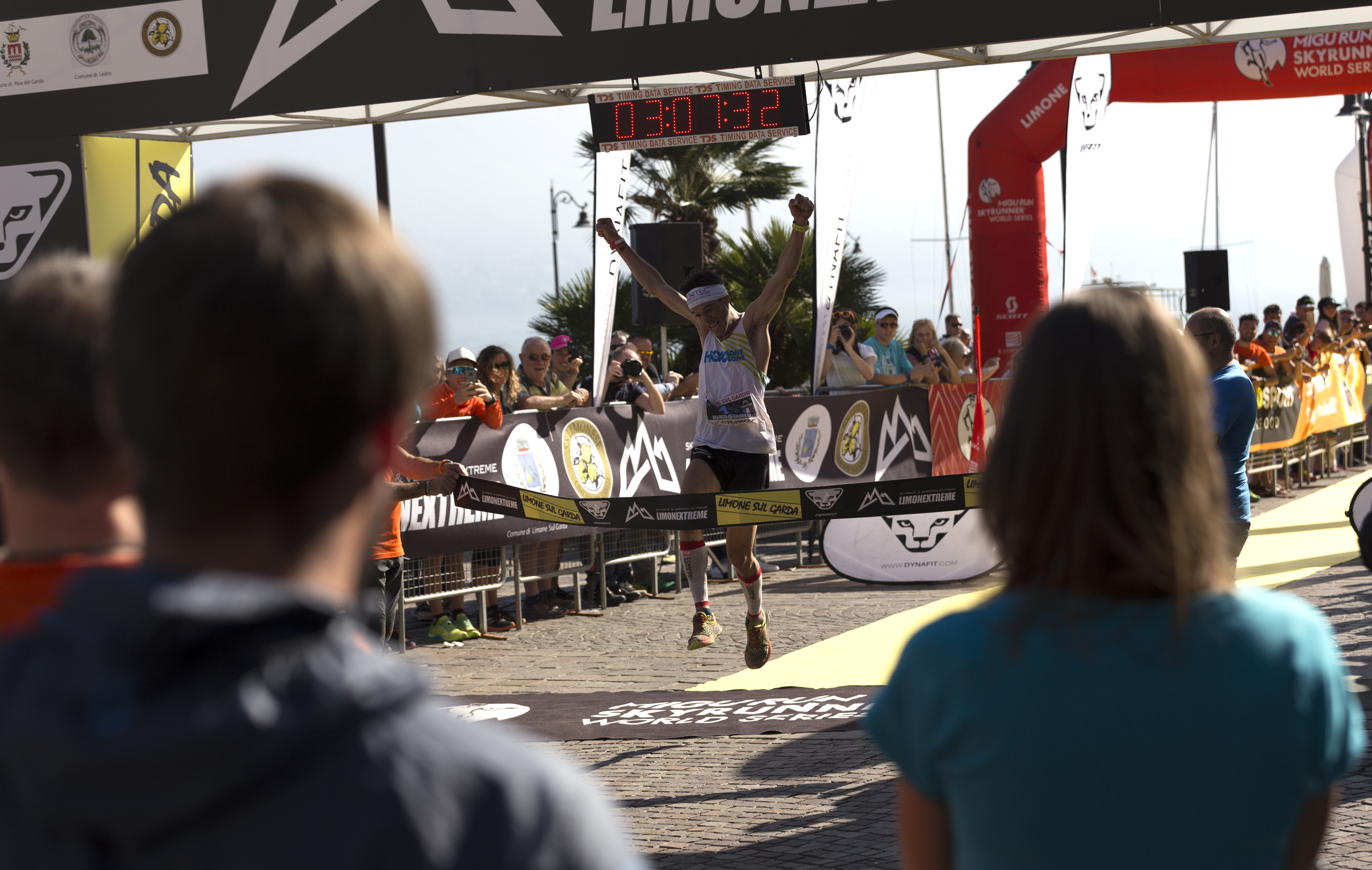
Marco De Gasperi at the finish lane.

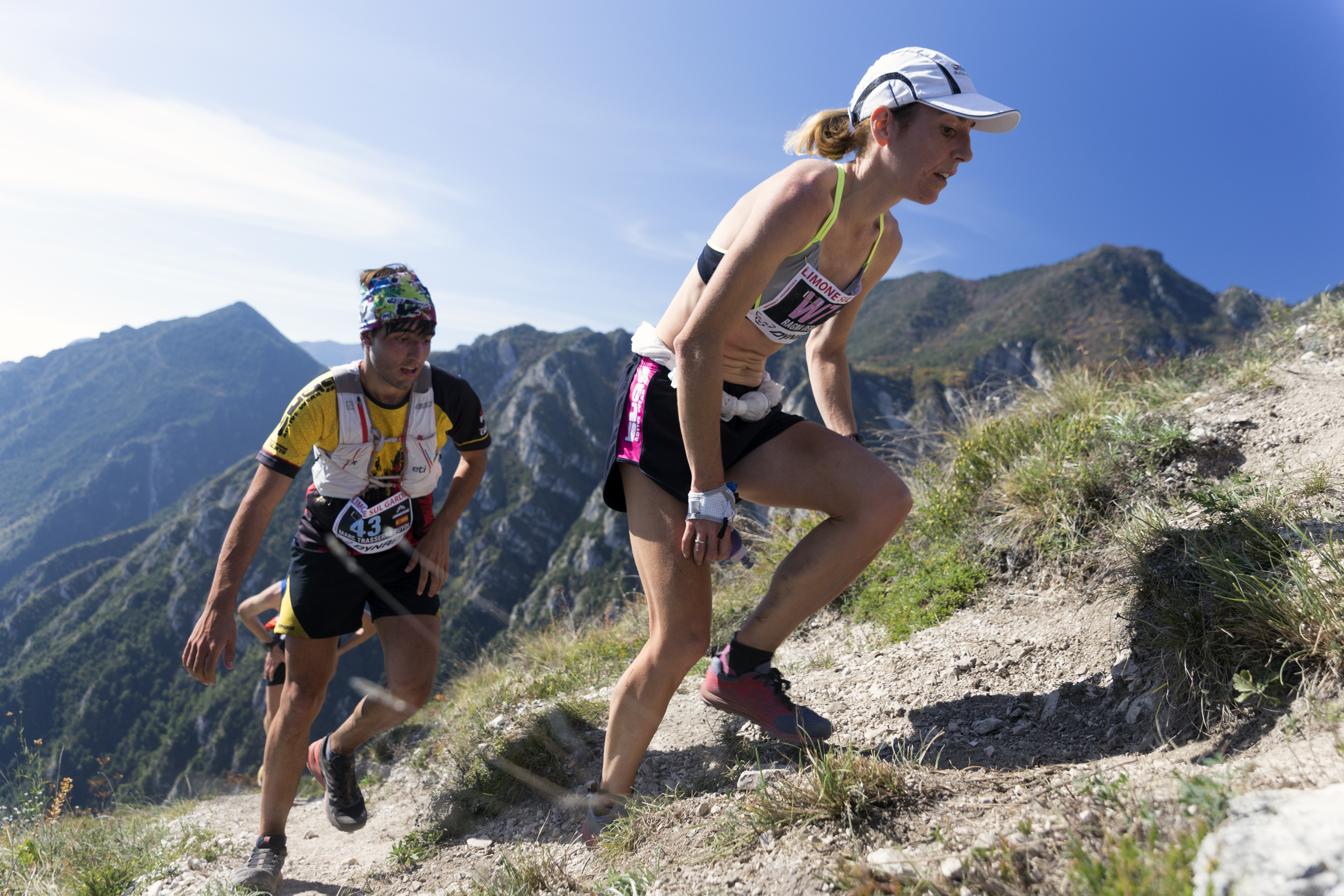
Ragna Debats 3rd at the end.

=== Calendar ===
#	Date	Race	Venue	Men's winner	Women's winner
1	2 May	Yading Skyrun	(China) Yading, Sichuan	(Nepal) Bhim Gurung	(United States) Megan Kimmel
2	28 May	Zegama-Aizkorri	(Spain) Zegama, Basque Country	(Norway) Stian Angermund	(Spain) Maite Maiora
3	18 June	Livigno SkyMarathon	(Italy) Livigno	(Italy) Tadei Pivk	(Spain) Maite Maiora
4	24 June	Olympus Marathon	(Greece) Dion	(Spain) Egea Aritz	(Netherlands) Ragna Debats
5	8 July	Buff Epic Trail	(Spain) Barruera	(Spain) Eugeni Gil Ocaña	(Spain) Oihana Azkorbebeitia
6	22 July	Dolomites SkyRace	(Italy) Canazei	(Spain) Jan Margarit	(Spain) Laura Orgué
7	30 July	SkyRace Comapedrosa	(Andorra) Arinsal, La Massana	(Spain) Jan Margarit	(Spain) Sheila Aviles
8	26 August	Matterhorn Ultraks	(Switzerland) Zermatt	(Italy) Marco De Gasperi	(Netherlands) Ragna Debats
9	2 September	The Rut 25K	(United States) Big Sky, Montana	(Spain) Egea Aritz	(Spain) Laura Orgué
10	16 September	Ring of Steall Skyrace	(United Kingdom) Kinlochleven	(Norway) Stian Angermund	(Spain) Laura Orgué
11	14 October	Limone SkyRace	(Italy) Limone sul Garda	(Italy) Marco De Gasperi	(Sweden) Tove Alexandersson

=== Men ===
Full results.

Rank	Athlete	Points
1	(Italy) Marco De Gasperi	511.6
2	(Spain) Aritz Egea	462.4
3	(Spain) Jan Margarit	455.6
4	(Switzerland) Pascal Egli	355
5	(Bulgaria) Kiril Nikolov	344.2
6	(Spain) Eugeni Gil Ocaña	333.6
7	(Andorra) Marc Casal Mir	319.4
8	(Spain) Eduard Hernandez	313.6
9	(Andorra) Oscar Casal Mir	287
10	(Norway) Stian Angermund	280

=== Women ===
Full results.

Rank	Athlete	Points
1	(Spain) Sheila Aviles	449,6
2	(Spain) Laura Orgué	416,8
3	(Netherlands) Ragna Debats	401,6
4	(United States) Hillary Gerardi	376
5	(Spain) Oihana Azkorbebeitia	364
6	(Spain) Maite Maiora	332,4
7	(Spain) Laura Sola	289,6
8	(United States) Megan Kimmel	226,8
9	(Spain) Laia Andreau	183,6
10	(Italy) Silvia Rampazzo	175,5

== Sky Ultra ==
=== Calendar ===
Bonus races (20% extra points)

Race by race.

#	Date	Race	Venue	Men's winner	Women's winner
1	13 May	Transvulcania Ultramarathon (75 km)	(Spain) La Palma Canary Islands	(United States) Timothy Freriks	(Sweden) Ida Nilsson
2	4 June	Ultra SkyMarathon Madeira (55 km)	(Portugal) Madeira	(United Kingdom) Jonathan Albon	(United States) Hillary Allen
3	9 June	Scenic Trail (113 km)	(Switzerland) Lugano	(Germany) Stephan Hugenschmidt	(Italy) Francesca Canepa
4	8 July	High Trail Vanoise (68 km)	(France) Val d’Isère	(Spain) Luis Alberto Hernando	(United States) Megan Kimmel
5	3 September	The Rut 50K (50 km)	(United States) Big Sky, Montana	(Spain) Luis Alberto Hernando	(Netherlands) Ragna Debats
6	9 September	Devil’s Ridge Ultra (80 km)	(China) Gobi Desert	(China) Qi Min	(Italy) Francesca Canepa
7	16 September	Salomon Ben Nevis Ultra (110 km)	(United Kingdom) Kinlochleven	(United Kingdom) Donald Campbell	(Nepal) Mira Rai
8	23 September	Ultra Pirineu (110 km)	(Spain) Bagà	(Spain) Pablo Villa	(Spain) Maite Maiora

=== Men ===
Full results.

Rank	Athlete	Points
1	(Spain) Luis Alberto Hernando	305
2	(France) Aurélien Dunand-Pallaz	271.6
3	(Russia) Dmitry Mityaev	259.6
4	(Czech Republic) Marek Causidis	179.6
5	(Spain) Francesc Solé	159.4
6	(France) Nicolas Martin	150
7	(Spain) Pere Aurell	148.4
8	(Andorra) Xavier Teixido	134
9	(Czech Republic) Jan Bartas	121.2
10	(United States) Morgan Elliott	105.6

=== Women ===
Full results.

Rank	Athlete	Points
1	(Netherlands) Ragna Debats	295.6
2	(United States) Hillary Allen	262
3	(Italy) Francesca Canepa	257.6
4	(Russia) Ekaterina Mityaeva	214
5	(Spain) Eva Moreda	204.8
6	(Austria) Andrea Huser	142
7	(United States) Kristina Pattison	123.6
8	(United States) Megan Kimmel	120
9	(Spain) Elisabet Bertran	117.6
10	(United States) Brittany Peterson	105.6

== Sky Extreme ==
=== Calendar ===
Bonus races (20% extra points)

#	Date	Race	Venue	Men's winner	Women's winner
1	16 July	Royal Ultra Sky Marathon	(Italy) Ceresole Reale	(Nepal) Bhim Gurung	(Spain) Maite Maiora
2	5 August	Tromsø SkyRace	(Norway) Tromsø	(United Kingdom) Jonathan Albon	(Spain) Maite Maiora
3	17 September	Salomon Glen Coe Skyline	(United Kingdom) Kinlochleven	(Spain) Kilian Jornet	(Sweden) Emelie Forsberg

=== Men ===
Full results.

Rank	Athlete	Points
1	(United Kingdom) Jonathan Albon	208
2	(Nepal) Bhim Gurung	205.6
3	(Sweden) André Jonsson	153
4	(Spain) Pere Aurell	152.4
5	(United Kingdom) Hector Haines	140
6	(United States) Cody Lind	132.8
7	(Morocco) Zaid Ait Malek	126.2
8	(Norway) Hans Smedsrød	110.6
9	(Spain) Eric Moya	106.4
10	(Spain) Javier Bodas	104

=== Women ===
Full results.

Rank	Athlete	Points
1	(Spain) Maite Maiora	220
2	(Netherlands) Ragna Debats	183.6
3	(Norway) Malene Blikken Haukøy	154
4	(United States) Katie Schide	142
5	(Sweden) Emelie Forsberg	100
6	(Spain) Roser Español	100
7	(Spain) Nuria Picas	93.6
8	(United States) Megan Kimmel	88
9	(Russia) Ekaterina Mityaeva	78
10	(Spain) Silvia Puigarnau	78

== Overall ==
=== Men ===
Full results.

Rank	Athlete	Points
1	(United Kingdom) Jonathan Albon	438.8
2	(Spain) Pere Aurell	360.2
3	(Sweden) André Jonsson	356
4	(Morocco) Zaid Ait Malek	349.4
5	(United Kingdom) Hector Haines	275.8
6	(France) Beñat Marmissolle	247.4
7	(Sweden) Sebastian Ljungdahl	107
8	(Czech Republic) Aleš Palko	61.2

=== Women ===
Full results.

Rank	Athlete	Points
1	(Spain) Maite Maiora	540
2	(Netherlands) Ragna Debats	533.6
3	(United States) Megan Kimmel	434.8
4	(Spain) Roser Español	188
5	(United States) Hillary Allen	178
