= 2016 Skyrunner World Series =

Winners
- SkyRace: (Italy) Tadei Pivk (United States) Megan Kimmel
- Sky Ultra: (Spain) Cristofer Clemente (Spain) Gemma Arenas
- Vertical Kilometer: (Italy) Philip Goetsch (France) Christel Dewalle
- Sky Extreme: (United Kingdom) Jonathan Albon (United Kingdom) Jasmin Paris

Competitions
- Venues: 18 venues
- Individual: 23 events

The 2016 Skyrunner World Series was the 15th edition of the global skyrunning competition, Skyrunner World Series, organised by the International Skyrunning Federation from 2002.

From this edition is included a new category, Sky Extreme.

== Results ==
=== Category Sky ===
Sky champions of the season are the Italian Tadei Pivk and the American Megan Kimmel.

Bonus races (20% extra points)

Race	Country	Date	Men's winner	Women's winner
Yading Skyrun	China	30 April	(Nepal) Bhim Gurung	(United States) Megan Kimmel
Maratòn Alpina Zegama-Aizkorri	Spain	22 May	(Spain) Kílian Jornet Burgada	(Norway) Yngvild Kaspersen
Livigno SkyMarathon	Italy	26 June	(Italy) Tadei Pivk	(Italy) Elisa Desco
Dolomites SkyRace	Italy	17 July	(Italy) Tadei Pivk	(Spain) Laura Orgué
SkyRace Comapedrosa	Andorra	31 July	(United Kingdom) Tom Owens	(Spain) Laura Orgué
Matterhorn Ultraks 46K	Switzerland	30 August	(Switzerland) Marc Lauenstein	(United States) Megan Kimmel
The Rut 28K	United States	3 September	(Spain) Hassan Ait Chaou	(United States) Megan Kimmel
Limone Extreme SkyRace	Italy	15 October	(France) Alexis Sévennec	(United States) Megan Kimmel
Champions			(Italy) Tadei Pivk	(United States) Megan Kimmel

=== Category Ultra ===
Bonus races (20% extra points)

Race	Country	Date	Men's winner	Women's winner
Transvulcania Ultramarathon	Spain	7 May	(Spain) Luis Alberto Hernando	(Sweden) Ida Nilsson
Ultra SkyMarathon Madeira	Portugal	4 June	(Spain) Cristofer Clemente	(Spain) Gemma Arenas
High Trail Vanoise	France	10 July	(France) Nicolas Martin	(France) Anne-Lise Rousset
The Rut 50K	United States	4 September	(Spain) Cristofer Clemente	(Sweden) Ida Nilsson
Ultra Pirineu	Spain	24 September	(Spain) Miguel Heras	(Spain) Gemma Arenas
Champions			(Spain) Cristofer Clemente	(Spain) Gemma Arenas

=== Category Vertical ===
Bonus races (20% extra points)

Race	Country	Date	Men's winner	Women's winner
Kilometro Vertical Transvulcania	Spain	5 May	(Colombia) Saul Padua Rodriguez	(United Kingdom) Emily Collinge
Santa Caterina Vertical Kilometer	Italy	24 June	(Italy) Philip Goetsch	(France) Christel Dewalle
Kilomètre Vertical Face de Bellevarde	France	8 July	(France) Xavier Gachet	(France) Christel Dewalle
Dolomites Vertical Kilometer	Italy	15 July	(Italy) Philip Goetsch	(Spain) Laura Orgué
Blåmann Vertical	Norway	5 August	(Norway) Stian Angermund-Vik	(Sweden) Emelie Forsberg
Lone Peak Vertical Kilometer	United States	2 September	(Czech Republic) Ondrej Fejfar	(Spain) Laura Orgué
Vertical Grèste de la Mughéra	Italy	14 October	(Italy) Philip Goetsch	(France) Christel Dewalle
Champions			(Italy) Philip Goetsch	(France) Christel Dewalle

=== Category Extreme ===
Bonus races (20% extra points)

Race	Country	Date	Men's winner	Women's winner
Tromsø SkyRace	Norway	6 August	(United Kingdom) Tom Owens	(United Kingdom) Jasmin Paris
Kima Trophy	Italy	28 August	(Nepal) Bhim Gurung	(Sweden) Emelie Forsberg
Glen Coe Skyline	United Kingdom	18 September	(United Kingdom) Jonathan Albon	(United Kingdom) Jasmin Paris
Champions			(United Kingdom) Jonathan Albon	(United Kingdom) Jasmin Paris
