= 2015 Skyrunner World Series =

Winners
- SkyRace: (Italy) Tadei Pivk (United States) Stevie Kremer
- Sky Ultra: (Spain) Kílian Jornet (Sweden) Emelie Forsberg
- Vertical Kilometer: (Switzerland) Remi Bonnet (Spain) Laura Orgué

Competitions
- Venues: 10 venues
- Individual: 15 events

The 2015 Skyrunner World Series was the 14th edition of the global skyrunning competition, Skyrunner World Series, organised by the International Skyrunning Federation from 2002.

Same format of the seasons 2013 and 2014.

== Results ==
=== Category Sky ===
Bonus races (20% extra points)

Race	Date	Men's winner	Women's winner
Dolomites SkyRace (Italy)	July 19	Tadei Pivk	Megan Kimmel
Matterhorn Ultraks 46K (Switzerland)	August 22	Martin Anthamatten	Elisa Desco
The Rut 25K (USA)	September 5	Remi Bonnet	Megan Kimmel
Lantau 2 Peaks (Hong Kong)	October 4	Remi Bonnet	Yngvild Kaspersen
Limone Extreme SkyRace (Italy)	October 18	Remi Bonnet	Laura Orgué
2015 SkyRace champions		Tadei Pivk	Laura Orgué

=== Category Ultra ===
Bonus races (20% extra points)

Race	Date	Men's winner	Women's winner
Transvulcania Ultramarathon (Spain)	May 9	Luis Alberto Hernando	Emelie Forsberg
Mont Blanc 80K (France)	June 26	Alex Nichols	Mira Rai
Tromsø SkyRace (Norway)	August 2	Jonathan Albon	Emelie Forsberg
The Rut 50K (USA)	September 6	Franco Colle	Emelie Forsberg
Ultra Pirineu (Spain)	September 19	Kílian Jornet Burgada	Emelie Forsberg
2015 Ultra champions		Luis Alberto Hernando	Emelie Forsberg (3)

=== Category Vertical ===
Bonus races (20% extra points)

Race	Date	Men's winner	Women's winner
Kilomètre Vertical Face de Bellevarde (France)	July 10	François Gonon	Laura Orgué
Dolomites Vertical (Italy)	July 17	Philip Goetsch	Christel Dewalle
Blåmann Vertical (Norway)	July 31	Stian Hovind-Angermund	Emelie Forsberg
Lone Peak Vertical Kilometer (USA)	September 4	Remi Bonnet	Laura Orgué
Limone Extreme Vertical Kilometer (Italy)	October 15	Remi Bonnet	Christel Dewalle
2015 VK champions		Remi Bonnet	Laura Orgué (3)
