= Jonathan Albon =

British runner

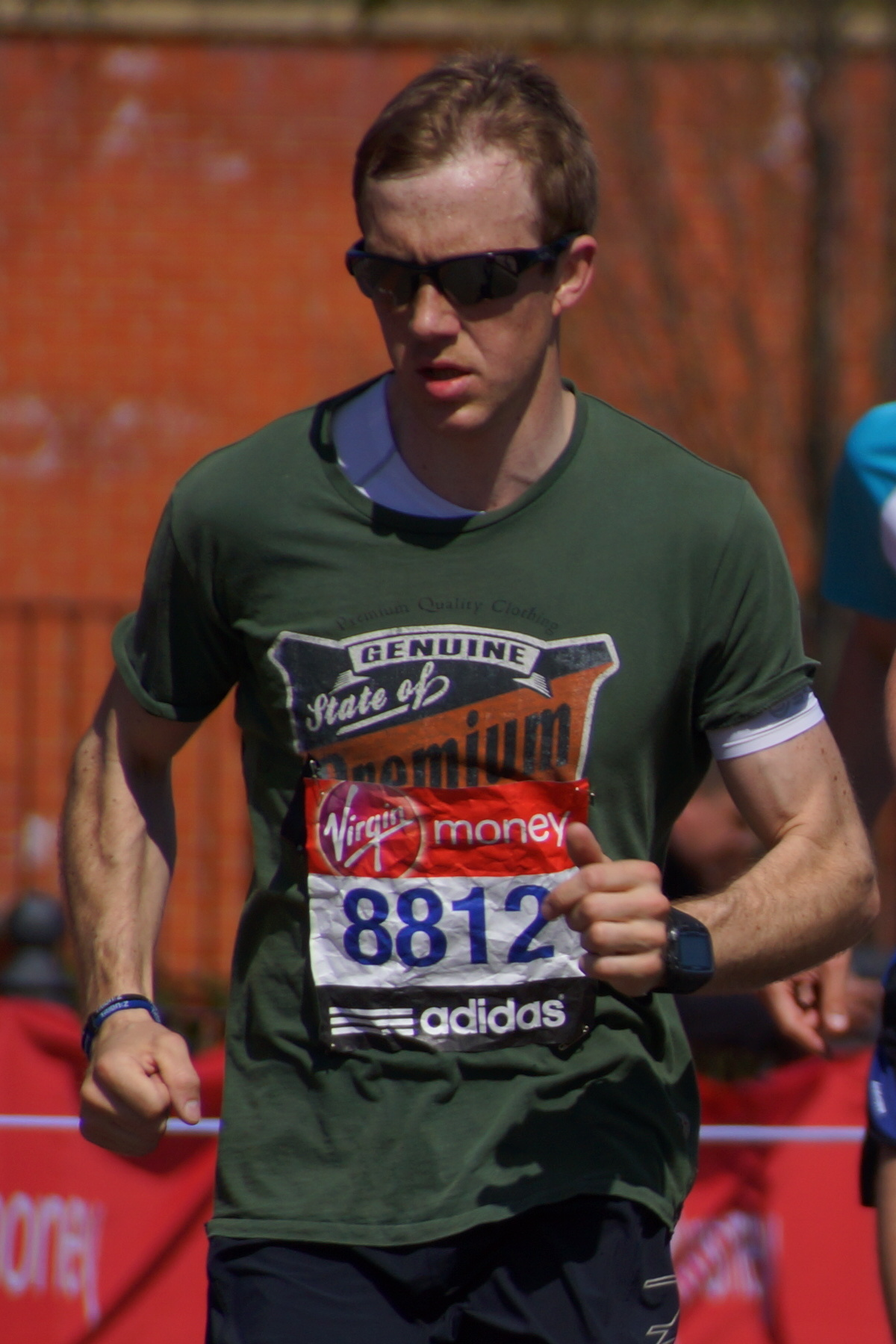
- Jonathan Albon at 2013 London Marathon

Personal information
- Nationality: British
- Born: 19 April 1989 (age 37) Harlow, Essex, England, UK
- Height: 1.79 m (5 ft 10 in)
- Weight: 67 kg (148 lb)

Sport
- Country: Great Britain
- Sport: Sky running, obstacle racing
- Club: Gore Running Wear

Achievements and titles
- World finals: 3 Skyrunning World Cup: Extreme (2016, 2017); Overall (2017)
Medal record
Skyrunning
World Championships
Gold medal – first place	2018 Kinlochleven	Ultra SkyMarathon
Trail running
IAU World Championships
Gold medal – first place	2019 Coimbra	Individual
Silver medal – second place	2019 Coimbra	Team
Bronze medal – third place	2018 Castellón	Team
WMRA World Championships
Gold medal – first place	2023 Innsbruc-Stubai	Short Race Team
Bronze medal – third place	2021 Chiang Mai	Short Race
Bronze medal – third place	2021 Chiang Mai	Short Race Team
Obstacle Course Racing
Adventurey OCR World Championships
Gold medal – first place	2014 Cincinnati	Long course
Gold medal – first place	2014 Cincinnati	Team
Gold medal – first place	2015 Cincinnati	Long course
Gold medal – first place	2015 Cincinnati	Team
Gold medal – first place	2016 Blue Mountains	Long course
Gold medal – first place	2016 Blue Mountains	Team
Gold medal – first place	2017 Blue Mountains	Long course
Gold medal – first place	2017 Blue Mountains	Short course
Gold medal – first place	2018 Essex	Long course
Gold medal – first place	2018 Essex	Short course
Gold medal – first place	2019 Essex	Long course
Gold medal – first place	2019 Essex	Short course
Silver medal – second place	2016 Blue Mountains	Short course
OCR European Championships
Gold medal – first place	2017 Amsterdam	Long course
Gold medal – first place	2017 Amsterdam	Short course
Gold medal – first place	2018 Esbjerg	Long course
Spartan Race World Championships
Gold medal – first place	2014 Vermont	Long course
Gold medal – first place	2018 Lake Tahoe	Long course
Silver medal – second place	2017 Lake Tahoe	Long course
Bronze medal – third place	2019 Lake Tahoe	Long course
Bronze medal – third place	2021 Abu Dhabi	Long course
Spartan Race European Championships
Gold medal – first place	2015 Slovakia	Long course
Gold medal – first place	2016 Edinburgh	Long course
Gold medal – first place	2019 Dolomites	Long course
Gold medal – first place	2021 Verbier	Long course
Spartan Race Trifecta World Championships
Gold medal – first place	2018 Sparta	Individual
Tougher Mudder World Championship
Gold medal – first place	2018 Seattle	Long course
Gold medal – first place	2024 AlUla	Infinity
Tougher Mudder European Championship
Gold medal – first place	2018 Hemel Hempstead	Long course

Jonathan Albon (born 19 April 1989) is a British sky runner and obstacle course racer who has won three Skyrunner World Series.

== Biography ==
Originally from Great Dunmow in Essex, Albon later moved to live in Bergen, Norway.

He twice won the final ranking of Sky Extreme (2016 and 2017) and has once been the overall winner of the Skyrunner World Series. As an obstacle racer, he has won the Adventurey world championships in 2014, 2015, 2016, 2017, 2018 and 2019. He has also won the Spartan World Championships in 2014 and 2018.

Albon won the Trail World Championships in 2019.

In 2021 Albon won the OCC at the Ultra-Trail du Mont-Blanc. The following year, he won the Mont Blanc Marathon. He placed second in CCC at UTMB 2022. In 2023 he won CCC at UTMB. In 2024 Albon won the Transvulcania Ultramarathon. He placed 6th in the 2024 Western States 100miler.

== 2017 SWS Victory ==
Overall race by race.

#	Date	Race	Venue	Category	Points
1	2 May	Yading Skyrun	(China) Yading, Sichuan	SKy Classic	-
2	13 May	Transvulcania Ultramarathon (75 km)	(Spain) La Palma Canary Islands	SKy Ultra	-
3	28 May	Maratòn Alpina Zegama-Aizkorri	(Spain) Zegama, Basque Country	SKy Classic	60
4	3 June	Ultra SkyMarathon Madeira (55 km)	(Portugal) Madeira	SKy Ultra	100
5	9 June	Scenic Trail (113 km)	(Switzerland) Lugano	SKy Ultra	-
6	18 June	Livigno SkyMarathon	(Italy) Livigno	SKy Classic	-
7	24 June	Olympus Marathon	(Greece) Dion	SKy Classic	-
8	8 July	Buff Epic Trail	(Spain) Barruera	SKy Classic	-
9	8 July	High Trail Vanoise (68 km)	(France) Val d’Isère	SKy Ultra	-
10	16 July	Royal Gran Paradiso	(Italy) Ceresole Reale	SKy Extreme	-
11	22 July	Dolomites SkyRace	(Italy) Canazei	SKy Classic	-
12	30 July	SkyRace Comapedrosa	(Andorra) Arinsal, La Massana	SKy Classic	-
13	5 August	Tromsø SkyRace	(Norway) Tromsø	SKy Extreme	120
14	26 August	Matterhorn Ultraks	(Switzerland) Zermatt	SKy Classic	70.8
15	2 September	The Rut 25K	(United States) Big Sky, Montana	SKy Classic	-
16	3 September	The Rut 50K (50 km)	(United States) Big Sky, Montana	SKy Ultra	-
17	9 September	Devil’s Ridge Ultra (80 km)	(China) Gobi Desert	SKy Ultra	-
18	16 September	Salomon Ring of Steall Skyrace	(United Kingdom) Kinlochleven	SKy Classic	-
19	16 September	Salomon Ben Nevis Ultra (110 km)	(United Kingdom) Kinlochleven	SKy Ultra	-
20	17 September	Salomon Glen Coe Skyline	(United Kingdom) Kinlochleven	SKy Extreme	88
21	23 September	Ultra Pirineu (110 km)	(Spain) Bagà	SKy Ultra	-
22	14 October	Limone SkyRace	(Italy) Limone sul Garda	SKy Classic	-
Points total					438.8
