= Emelie Forsberg =

Swedish athlete

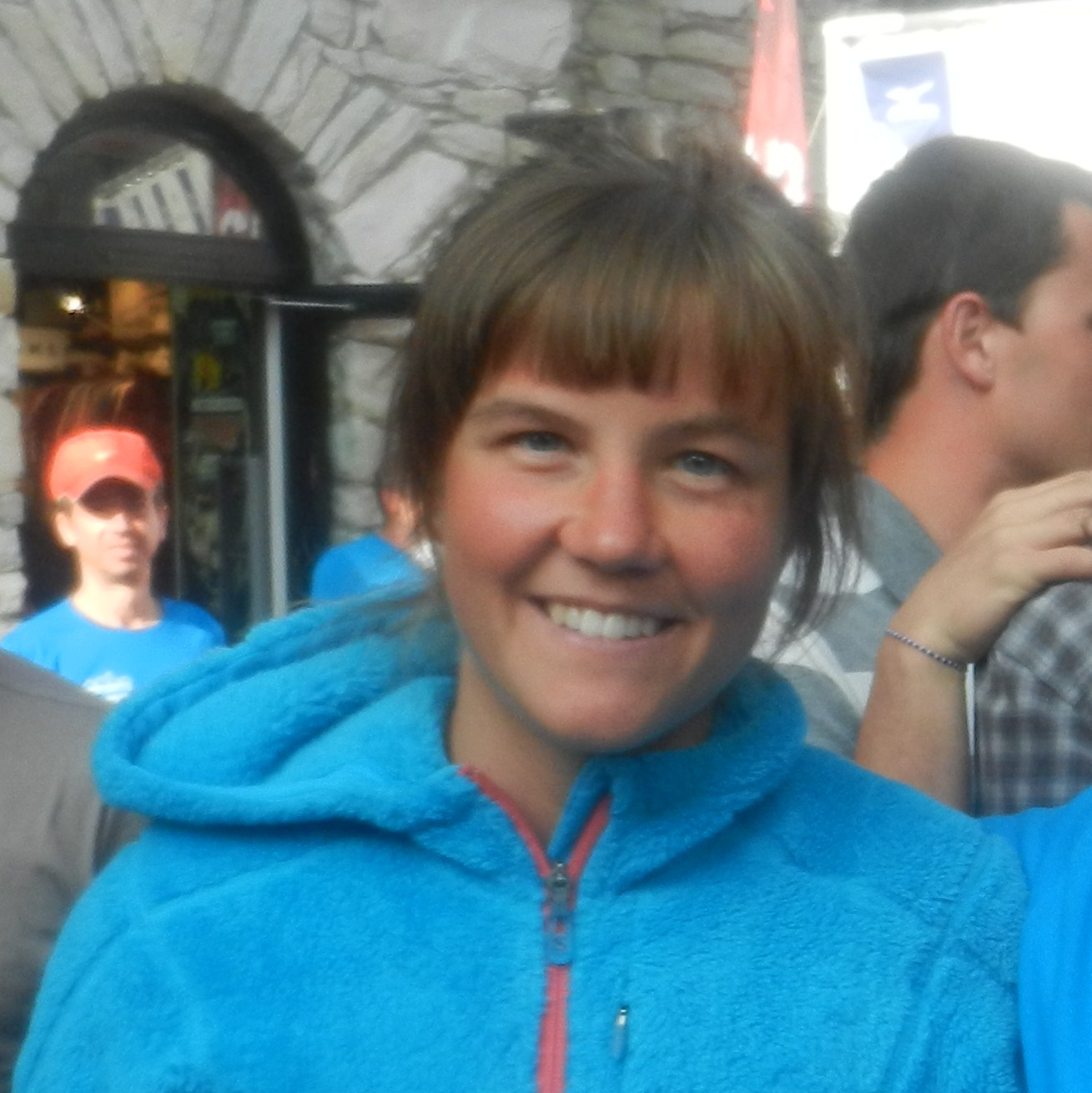
- Forsberg in July 2013

Personal information
- Full name: Emelie Tina Forsberg
- Nationality: Swedish
- Born: 11 December 1986 (age 39)
- Life partner: Kilian Jornet
Medal record
Skyrunning
Skyrunner® World Series (Note: Up to and including 2012 the Skyrunner World Series had a combined winner, but no winners of the individual events. From 2013 there was no combined winner, only winners of the three events Vertical kilometer, Sky and Ultra. From 2016 there are four events: Vertical kilometer, Sky, Sky Extreme and Ultra)
Gold medal – first place	2012	Combined
Gold medal – first place	2013	Ultra
Gold medal – first place	2014	Ultra
Gold medal – first place	2015	Ultra
Silver medal – second place	2013	Sky
Bronze medal – third place	2012	Ultra
World Championships
Gold medal – first place	2014 Chamonix	Ultra SkyMarathon
European Championships
Gold medal – first place	2013 Canazei	Sky
Gold medal – first place	2013 Vicenza	Ultra
Gold medal – first place	2015 Val d’Isère	Ultra
Silver medal – second place	2013 Canazei	Vertical
Ski mountaineering
World Cup (Note: The International Ski Mountaineering Federation sponsors five World Cups: Individual, Vertical, Sprint, Long distance team and General overall)
Bronze medal – third place	2014/2015	Sprint
Bronze medal – third place	2014/2015	Combined
World Championships (Note: Ski Mountaineering World Championships are held odd years and European Championships even years)
Silver medal – second place	2017	Sprint
Silver medal – second place	2017	Vertical
Bronze medal – third place	2013	Sprint
Bronze medal – third place	2013	Vertical
Bronze medal – third place	2015	Individual (Note: Forsberg was originally ranked 4th in the competition but moved up to bronze after one of her competitors was charged with doping)
Bronze medal – third place	2017	Combined
European Championships
Bronze medal – third place	2018	Individual
La Grande Course (Note: La Grande Course consists of the seven most important European team events: Adamello Ski Raid (Italy), Altitoy-Ternua (France), Patrouille des Glaciers (Switzerland), Pierra Menta (France), Millet Tour du Rutor Extrême (Italy) and Mezzalama Trophy (Italy). Some events are held every two years. Although La Grand Course consists of team events the number of team members varies from two to three, and the composition of the teams can vary from one event to another. The combined ranking is therefore calculated on an individual level.)
Bronze medal – third place	2015	Team

Emelie Tina Forsberg (born 11 December 1986) is a Swedish athlete specializing in trail running (skyrunning, mountain running) and ski mountaineering. She has won repeated victories in different disciplines, including European and World Championships.

== Biography ==
=== Childhood and youth ===
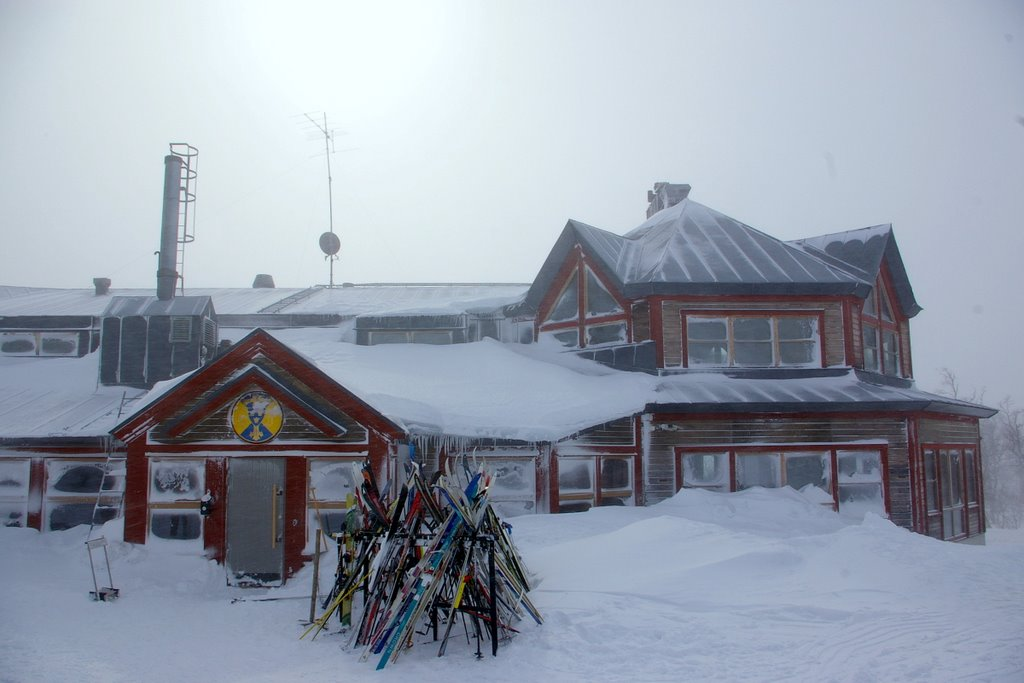
Storulvån Mountain Lodge in Sweden where Forsberg worked in 2004

Emelie Forsberg grew up in the small village Noraström in Kramfors Municipality, some 40 km (25 mi) north of Härnösand on Sweden's High Coast. Her father died when she was new-born and according to Forsberg her mother had a tough time combining work, studies and taking care of her two daughters. Orienteering, trekking, climbing, skiing, foraging for mushrooms and berries were an integral part of her life since she was very young.

In a 2017 public lecture Forsberg stated that between 15 and 20 years of age she defined herself as a climber. She moved to the Swedish mountains at age 18 and worked as a waitress in the Storulvån Mountain Lodge in the Åre Ski Area, where she convinced her boss to send her to a baking course. While living in Storulvån, Forsberg ran in the mountains in her spare time for love of nature, for the fun of it, and as a means of transportation.

=== Early career ===
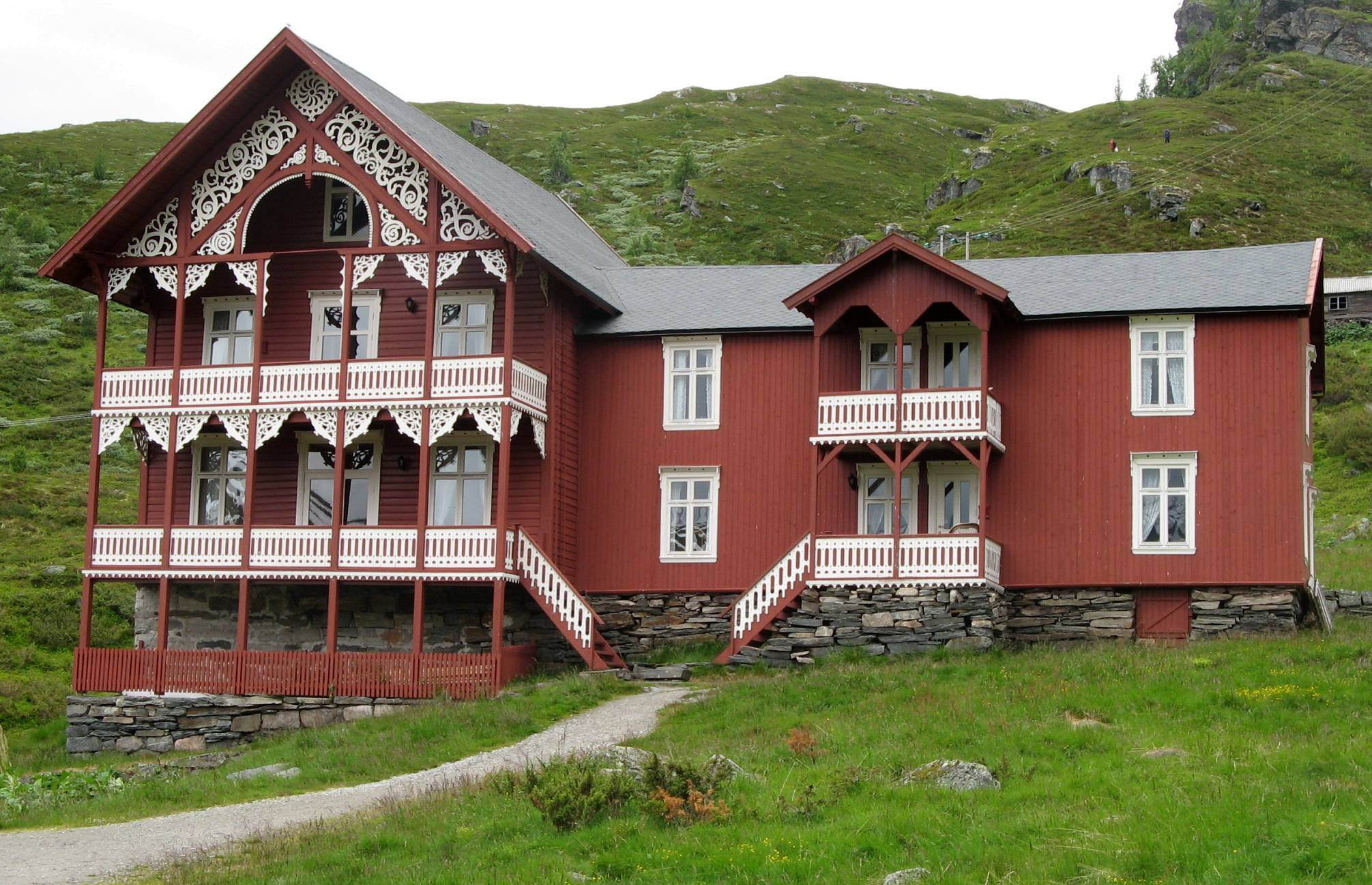
Turtagrø Hotel (old annex) in Norway where Forsberg worked in 2011

Forsberg's first serious trail race was the Swedish Fjällmaraton in 2009. She had borrowed a backpack from a friend and brought a chocolate mud cake that she had baked. Before the last big ascent she stopped for 20 minutes and ate the cake, got new energy and won the race. Two years later she was back, did not stop to eat en route and improved her time by 30 minutes. In 2014 when an established world class runner Forsberg was back again, improved her time by another 30 minutes and set a new course record.

In 2011 Forsberg worked at the Turtagrø Hotel in Hurrungane on the outskirts of Jotunheimen National Park in Norway. In May 2012 she was invited to run in an international trail event, Zegama-Aizkorri Mendi Maratoia, where she finished in 3rd place. Her following trail event in July 2012, the Dolomites Skyrace, she won. Says Forsberg: "It was insane. It was cool to realize that what I had been doing in my solitude in the Swedish mountains was a big sport in the Alps". Forsberg moved from Storulvån to Tromsø in Norway, in order to study at the University of Tromsø, and run in the mountains there.

Prior to late 2012 Forsberg had no serious competition experience in ski mountaineering. Her first race was in Chamonix on 9 December where she placed third. Forsberg: "I was just back form The North Face 50 mile race in San Francisco and had maybe 3 days of skiing on a pair of Kilians old skis and said yes to join the race. Yeay! Oh man it was so fun! I didn't really understood how the binding worked (I was a telemarker and a x country skier!) so I lost my skis in the uphill, I lost my skins and so many more small mistakes. But I enjoyed it, I had fun and I pushed hard." In late December she placed second in a Swedish race in Åre after losing her ski skins and running one out of eight laps on foot. Shortly after, in January 2013, she won the Norwegian Championship by seven minutes over her closest rival, upon which she embarked on another round of skiing so that she was not available for interviews after her victory. She followed up with Alpiniski later in the same month. In early February she became French champion in the vertical event and a week later won bronze medals in the sprint and vertical events at the World Championships.

=== Professional career ===
In the Skyrunning World Series Forsberg has been especially successful in the Ultra Series where she won every race in 2013-2015 except for the 2014 Trofeo Kima where she took a wrong turn when four hours into the race and half an hour below the course record time; she descended 500 metres (1,600 feet) and had to ascend again, losing one hour, then worked her way back up the field to 2nd position. Apart from her favored ultra distance Forsberg runs races varying from the vertical kilometer to 100 miles (160 kilometres), usually finishing in the top five when not winning, and often competing on consecutive days or three days in a row, as in the 2015 the Rut where she ran the vertical kilometer on Friday, the Sky 25 km (16 mi) distance on Saturday and finishing off with the Ultra 50 km (31 mi) distance on Sunday, comfortably winning and setting a new course record.

Forsberg runs 10 km in 36 minutes. She is also a strong uphill runner as witnessed by her results in vertical kilometer races. But her real strength is downhill running where she constantly outruns her competitors and sets new records. Says Forsberg: "I’m so comfortable in that terrain so it doesn’t feel fast at all. Training helps and also I think it makes a lot of difference that I have always just played outside running on trails, rocks etc." Forsberg claims that she has only fallen twice while running, once during the 2014 Transvulcania race where she fell running uphill after being pushed from behind and sustained a hand and arm injury that required immediate medical care, once on a road when running with her boyfriend.

In ski mountaineering Forsberg's greatest achievement is in her own opinion winning the biennial Trofeo Mezzalama in 2015 with teammates Axelle Mollaret and Jennifer Fiechter, barely three minutes ahead of world champions Laëtitia Roux, Mireia Miró Varela and Séverine Pont-Combe and a full hour and a half ahead of the bronze laureats. Said Forsberg a few days later: "I almost feel like I could finish my career." As in Skyrunning she competes in all ski mountaineering distances, as well as team events. She is also able to transition fast from winter to summer events and vice versa; one week after winning the 2015 Trofeo Mezzalama race on skis she won the 73 km (45 mi) Transvulcania by half an hour for her first Skyrunner World Series win of the season. Forsberg herself keeps a low profile; in a 2013 interview she answered the question "What are your strengths in ski mountaineering?" thus: "Hmm. I don't have any direct strengths. I'm a bit mediocre both uphill and downhill, I'd say."

Forsberg was a member of the Salomon team from 2012 to 2022, and was actively involved in the company's product development for trail running. In 2022 Forsberg joined the team of NNormal, a company co-founded by her partner Kilian Jornet.

In 2014 Forsberg and Jornet initiated and organized the first edition of the Tromsø SkyRace in Tromsø, Norway, part of the Skyrunner® World series from 2015. Forsberg does not have a trainer. Says Forsberg: "I like best to control everything myself. Moreover, there is no coach who thinks it is a good approach to compete in two seasons. So I go on my own."

Due to pregnancy and the COVID-19 pandemic Forsberg did not run or ski many races in 2019 and 2020.

=== ACL surgery ===
During the 2016 European Championships of Ski Mountaineering Forsberg broke her cruciate ligament on 5 February after a fellow competitor ran over her skis from behind. She had to abandon a season that had started better than ever, with Forsberg leading the International Ski Mountaineering Federation's World Cup Individual discipline. Prior to this serious injury Forsberg claimed that she had only been injured once (in the Transvulcania incident where she was pushed from behind running uphill), which she credits to taking good care of herself. Forsberg: "And also my love for pastries!". The ACL recovery process has been the subject of many Facebook and blog postings on Forsberg's part, including both rehab training and philosophy. Forsberg: "I think it's important to recognize hopelessness sometimes, but only for a short period of time, so it is important to seize the little hope that is there."

After her ACL surgery in early February 2016 Forsberg made her comeback in mid-June with three local Norwegian races where she ran uphill and walked downhill. On 23 July Forsberg won the Kendall Mountain run in Colorado and on 5 August the Blåmann Vertical km in Tromsø, Norway, that is part of the Skyrunner World Series. On 28 August Forsberg was back on the top international skyrunning scene after winning the biennial Trofeo Kima on her third attempt; in 2012 and 2014 she finished 2nd.

Two weeks after the skiing accident Forsberg started to practise yoga as one path to recovery. In August 2016 she announced in an interview: "I’m travelling to India to do the final 200 hours of yoga teacher training. I think it’ll be pretty intense."

=== Mountaineering ===
In April 2017 Forsberg announced that she and Kilian Jornet would attempt to climb Cho Oyu, a Himalayan peak of 8,188 meters, with a light and fast style spending only two weeks away from home. As preparation the pair slept for two weeks in an altitude tent simulating an altitude of 5,500 to 6,000 meters, and trained for a week at 4,000 meters in the Alps. After 10 days at base camp a summit attempt was made but Forsberg turned around at 7,700 meters due to worsening weather. Jornet continued but is not sure whether he reached the summit since visibility was near zero. She then returned directly to Europe to start the skyrunning season while Jornet stayed to make an attempt on Mount Everest. After her first race Forsberg commented on social media: "... it was still emotional from being awake the whole night waiting for Kilians message saying he was down. Well, cheers to the start of the season, from now it can only be better!"

=== Teams ===
Forsberg has competed for the following teams and clubs: (Note: Teams and clubs are listed as shown in the results from competitions. The first two teams listed are hotels/mountain lodges where Forsberg has worked. A small number of results show no team affiliation at all.)

- Turtagrø Turlag, Norway, 2009 (a mountain lodge where Forsberg worked)
- STF Kebnekaise, Sweden, 2010 (a mountain lodge where Forsberg worked)
- IKSU, Sweden, 2010 (a general sports club at the University of Umeå)
- Dynafit, 2011 (a team sponsored by a sports equipment manufacturer)
- Fjällframfart SK, Sweden, 2012 - (a sports club for alpine sports affiliated with the Swedish Climbing Federation)
- Salomon, 2012 - 2022 (a team sponsored by a sports equipment manufacturer)
- Swedish National Team - Ski mountaineering, 2013 - (selected by the Swedish Climbing Federation)
- Swedish National Team - Ultratrail, 2016 - (selected by the Swedish Athletics Association)
- Öbacka LK, 2016 - (a local running club close to where Forsberg was born)
- Måndalen IL, 2016 - (a local club where Forsberg lives)
- Nnormal, 2022 - (a team sponsored by a sports equipment manufacturer)

=== Motivation and values ===
Forsberg in 2016: "I have started to take pride in being a strong athlete, because 2012 I didn’t think at all that I was strong. I just did what I loved and I happened to be good at it. For me now it’s important to know that I can improve, have the motivation for it, and make a plan of how to get my athletic goal fulfilled. Now I also know how hard it is to be a professional athlete, you need to be motivated and never give up!" "Racing has only been a part of my life since four years, but nature and my passion for being outside– running/skiing/climbing/picking berries/walking/having a picnic/ gardening/farming–has always been there and I would not let anything take away my passion for that. That’s who I am… That is who I define myself as. I don’t define myself as a racer or competitor. But yes, I love winning, of course, it’s big, but at the same time it doesn’t matter at all."

In 2015 Forsberg wrote a blog entitled "Relationship mind, body and soul" that was widely cited in media for its balanced approach to food and weight in competitive running. Forsberg's concluding remark: "Love your hips, breasts, butt and belly. The fat keeps you warm. And healthy." Forsberg says that she follows no restricted diet and takes no food supplements. Forsberg: "I believe everything is good for you in small amount and as natural as possible."

Forsberg is a vegetarian and is fond of gardening. In the garden plot of the house on the outskirts of the valley in Chamonix that Forsberg shared with her boyfriend Kilian Jornet she cultivated green beans, pumpkin, squash, radish, beetroot, various salads, broccoli, cauliflower, and some herbs. Forsberg "It's a dream I've had a long time, to be half self-sufficient and I think about the ecological impact. Thanks to my lifestyle as it looks now, I can give it priority." On the small farm in Måndalen the opportunities for gardening are even better and Forsberg has expanded her ambitions in this area. She also devotes a separate Instagram account to the subject: "Måndalen Country living" (see External links below).

=== Personal life ===
In February 2016 Forsberg and Kilian Jornet bought a house in Måndalen in Rauma Municipality in the Norwegian county Møre og Romsdal. In 2017 the Rauma Chamber of Commerce awarded the title "Rauma Ambassador of the Year" to the couple.

Prior to Rauma they lived in a remodelled old mill in the hamlet Montroc outside of Chamonix in France. Both make a living from skyrunning and ski mountaineering.

Forsberg started studies to become a forester in 2005 but decided that the curriculum was not what she had anticipated. Four years later she instead started to study for a master's degree in biology at University of Umeå in Sweden and University of Tromsø in Norway. Her Masters deposition is on hold while she concentrates on training and racing professionally. At the University of Umeå Forsberg participated in the school's program for elite athletes, designed to facilitate academic studies in parallel with intensive training and competition. She loves to bake and eat buns after working a while as a baker. At times her recipes appear on her blog under the heading Recipes from a mountain lover. Forsberg is very active on social media and has over 190 000 followers on Facebook and 300 000 on Instagram (August 2021).

On 7 September 2013 Forsberg and Kílian Jornet were rescued by the PGHM (Peloton de Gendarmerie de Haute Montagne, Mountain Gendarmerie) on the Frendo spur of the North Face of Aiguille du Midi in the Mont Blanc massif close to Chamonix, France, in degenerating weather and with inadequate equipment for the situation. Both were extremely apologetic afterwards.

Forsberg's sister Evy Tess Therese Forsberg is an accomplished sportswoman who has competed on the Scotland women's national rugby sevens team and become European Weightlifting Champion.

In 2018 Forsberg together with fellow athletes Ida Nilsson and Mimmi Kotka started Moonvalley, an on-line shop dedicated to organic energy bars and sportsdrinks.

Forsberg gave birth to a daughter on 24 March 2019 (with Jornet as father). The couple's second daughter was born on 15 April 2021.

== Results ==
=== Skyrunning ===
The following list includes Forsberg's results in skyrunning. Some of the early events are not skyrunning, but rather traditional trail runs. These are included for the sake of completeness.

Some races are denoted as VK and others as vertical km; in both cases it means that runners go up a steep hill with 1,000 metres (3,300 feet) vertical elevation difference between start and finish.

2009

- 1st, Fjällmaraton 44 km (27 mi), Sweden

2010

- 1st, Björkliden Arctic Mountain Marathon (BAMM) 70 km (43 mi), Sweden, over two days, with Linda Berg
- 47th, Lidingöloppet 30 km (19 mi), Sweden
- 3rd, Molden Opp, VK, Norway

2011

- 1st, Fjällmaraton 44 km (27 mi), Sweden (2nd victory)
- 1st, Salomon Trail Tour Åre 10.9 km (6.8 mi), Sweden
- 1st, Björkliden Arctic Mountain Marathon (BAMM), Sweden, 70 km (43 mi) over two days, with Linda Berg (2nd straight victory)
- 2nd, Besseggløpet 14 km (8.7 mi), Norway
- 1st, Drakloppet 10 km (6.2 mi), Sweden
- 17th, Lidingöloppet 30 km (19 mi), Sweden

2012

- Winner of the World Championship in the Skyrunner® World Series
- Winner of Salomon Trail Tour Sweden (2nd straight victory)
- 1st, Salomon Trail Tour Kristianstad 21 km (13 mi), Kristianstad, Sweden
- 1st, KolmårdsTrailen 21 km (13 mi), Sweden
- 1st, Skatås Ryggar 21 km (13 mi), Sweden
- 1st, Salomon Trail Tour Sälen 21 km (13 mi), Sweden
- 3rd, Salomon Trail Tour Spring Cross 12 km (7.5 mi), Sweden
- 2nd, Yorkshire Three Peaks Race 37 km (23 mi), UK
- 3rd, Maratòn Alpina Zegama-Aizkorri 42 km (26 mi), Spain
- 1st, Kilian's Classik 45 km (28 mi), France
- 1st, Dolomites SkyRace 22 km (14 mi), Italy (new record)
- 5th, Giir di Mont 35 km (22 mi), Italy
- 1st, Pikes Peak Marathon 42 km (26 mi), Colorado, USA (new downhill record)
- 2nd, Trofeo Kima 52 km (32 mi), Italy
- 3rd, Cavalls del Vent 82 km (51 mi), Spain (later renamed Ultra Pirineu)
- 1st, 26th Mt. Kinabalu Climbathon 33 km (21 mi), Borneo, Malaysia
- 2nd, Grand Trail des Templiers 73 km (45 mi), France
- 1st, The North Face Endurance Challenge 50 mi (80 km), San Francisco, USA

2013

- Winner of the World Cup in the ultra skyrace series
- European Champion in skyrunning (Dolomites SkyRace)
- European Champion in ultra distance skyrunning (Trans D'Havet)
- 2nd, World cup of skyrunning
- 1st, Salomon Trail Tour Sälen 21 km (13 mi), Sweden (2nd straight victory)
- 1st, Drakloppet 10 km (6.2 mi), Sweden (2nd victory)
- 1st, Transgrancanaria marathon 42 km (26 mi), Spain
- 1st, Transvulcania 73 km (45 mi), Spain
- 2nd, European Championship in Vertical km (Dolomites Vertical Kilometer)
- 1st, Maratòn Alpina Zegama-Aizkorri 42 km (26 mi), Spain
- 2nd, Marathon du Mont Blanc 42 km (26 mi), France
- 1st, Ice Trail Tarentaise 65 km (40 mi), France (new course record)
- 1st, Dolomites SkyRace 22 km (14 mi), Italy (2nd victory, also 2013 European Championship in skyrunning distance skyrunning)
- 1st, Trans D'Havet 80 km (50 mi), Italy (also 2013 European Championship in ultra distance skyrunning)
- 1st, Matterhorn Ultraks 46 km (29 mi), Switzerland
- 1st, UROC 100 km (62 mi), Colorado, USA
- 3rd, Limone Extreme 23.5 km (14.6 mi) Italy
- 2nd, Grand Raid de la Réunion (aka La diagonale des fous) 100 mi (160 km), Réunion, France
- 3rd, The North Face Endurance Challenge 50 mi (80 km), San Francisco, USA
- 1st, Eideløpene VK, Norway

2014

- Winner of the Skyrunning World Series Ultra distance (2nd straight victory)
- World Champion in ultra distance skyrunning (Mont-Blanc 80K race)
- 2nd, Grimpée du Semnoz 16.5 km (10.3 mi), France
- 4th, Maratòn Alpina Zegama-Aizkorri 42 km (26 mi), Spain
- 1st, Mont-Blanc 80 km (84 km in 2014), France (also 2014 World Championship in ultra distance skyrunning)
- 1st, Resegup Skyrace 22 km (14 mi), Italy
- 1st, Run Richmond Park 10 km (6.2 mi), London, UK (not a skyrunning race)
- 1st, Ice Trail Tarantaise 65 km (40 mi), France (2nd victory)
- 2nd, Dolomites SkyRace 22 km (14 mi), Italy
- 1st, Giir di Mont 35 km (22 mi), Italy
- 5th, Matterhorn Ultraks 46 km (29 mi), Switzerland
- 1st, Fjällmaraton 44 km (27 mi), Sweden (3rd victory, new course record)
- 1st, Ottfjället upp 7 km (4.3 mi), Sweden (new course record)
- 2nd, Trofeo Kima 52 km (32 mi), Italy
- 1st, The Rut 50K, 50 km Montana, USA
- 16th, Limone Extreme 23.5 km (14.6 mi), Italy
- 2nd, Chandolin 2 x VK, Switzerland

2015

- Winner of the World Cup in the ultra skyrace series (3rd straight victory, participated in 5 ultra series races; won all)
- European Champion in ultra distance skyrunning (Ice Trail Tarentaise)
- 3rd, Transvulcania Vertical km, Spain
- 1st, Transvulcania 73 km (45 mi), Spain (2nd victory)
- 4th, Maratòn Alpina Zegama-Aizkorri 42 km (26 mi), Spain
- 1st, Verticale du Môle Vertical km, France
- 1st, Samoëns Trail Tour Verticale du Criou Vertical km, France
- 1st, Samoëns Trail Tour Trail Découverte 18 km (11 mi), France
- 8th, Mont-Blanc Vertical KM
- 2nd, Mont Blanc 10 km, France
- 1st, Mount Marathon Race 5 km (3.1 mi), 921 metres (3,022 feet) vertical return, Alaska, USA (new uphill, downhill and total records)
- 9th, Face de Bellevarde Vertical km, France
- 1st, Ice Trail Tarentaise 65 km (40 mi), France (3rd straight victory, also 2015 European Championship, Ultra skyrunning)
- 14th, Dolomites SkyRace Vertical km, Italy
- 4th, Dolomites SkyRace 22 km (14 mi), Italy
- 1st, Blåmann Vertical km, Norway
- 1st, Tromsø SkyRace 45 km (28 mi), Norway
- 1st, Glen Coe Skyline 53 km (33 mi), Scotland (2nd overall)
- 4th, The Rut - Lone Peak Vertical km, Big Sky Resort, Montana, USA
- 5th, The Rut - 25 km (16 mi), Big Sky Resort, Montana, USA
- 1st, The Rut - 50 km (31 mi), Big Sky Resort, Montana, USA (2nd straight victory, new course record after racing three days in a row)
- 1st, Ultra Pirineu 110 km (68 mi), Bagà, Spain
- 2nd, Altitrail de Chalin 12 km and 2,365 m (7,759 ft) vertical, Switzerland

2016

- 8th, Dalsnibba Run (Norwegian: Nibbeløpet) 21 km (13 mi), Norway (first competitive event after ACL surgery in February)
- 3rd, Lomseggen Upp Vertical km, Norway
- 7th, Besseggløpet 14 km (8.7 mi), Norway
- 1st, Kendall Mountain Run 19 km (12 mi), Colorado, USA
- 1st, Blåmann Vertical km, Norway (2nd straight victory)
- 2nd, Stranda Fjord Trail Race 33 km (21 mi), Norway
- 1st, Trofeo Kima 52 km (32 mi), Italy
- 1st, Trail de l'Arclusaz 26.7 km (16.6 mi), France

2017

- 1st, Åndalsnesløpet 5 km (3.1 mi), Norway
- 6th, Zegama-Aizkorri VK, Spain
- 8th, Maratòn Alpina Zegama-Aizkorri 42 km (26 mi), Spain
- 2nd, Dalsnibba Run (Norwegian: Nibbeløpet) 21 km (13 mi), Norway
- 1st, Mefjellet Opp, Vertical km, Norway
- 1st, Salomon 27K 27 km (17 mi), Sweden
- 2nd, Blåmann Vertical km, Norway
- 1st, Klauva Opp, Vertical km, Norway (course record)
- 4th, Skåla Opp, 1.8 vertical km, Norway
- 2nd Ultra-Trail Orsières - Champex - Chamonix (OCC) 56 km (35 mi), France
- 3rd Salomon Mamores VK, Scotland
- 1st Glen Coe Skyline 55 km (34 mi), Scotland (new course record)
- 3rd, Grand Trail des Templiers 76 km (47 mi), France

2018

- 1st, Bodom Trail 21 km (13 mi), Finland (new course record)
- 7th, Maratòn Alpina Zegama-Aizkorri 42 km (26 mi), Spain
- 2nd, Ultra Skymarathon Madeira 55 km (34 mi), Portugal
- 1st, Lomseggen Upp Vertical km, Norway (new course record)
- 3rd, Monte Rosa SkyMarathon 30 km (19 mi), Italy, competing in the male category in team with Kilian Jornet (female Fastest Known Time)

2019

- 6th, Dalsnibba Run (Norwegian: Nibbeløpet) 21 km (13 mi), Norway (Note: 11 weeks after giving birth to a daughter)
- 1st, Romsdalseggenløpet 8.6 km (5.3 mi), Norway
- 4th, Sky Pirineu 36 km (22 mi), Spain

2021

- 1st, Alle på Jensbu (Vertical km), Norway
- 2nd, Dalsnibba Run (Norwegian: Nibbeløpet) 21 km (13 mi), Norway
- 1st, Romsdalseggenløpet 8.6 km (5.3 mi), Norway (second straight win)
- 4th, Molde 7 Topper 19 km (12 mi), Norway

2022

- 1st, Zegama-Aizkorri VK, Spain
- 24th, Maratòn Alpina Zegama-Aizkorri 42 km (26 mi), Spain
- 1st, Dalsnibba Run (Norwegian: Nibbeløpet) 21 km (13 mi), Norway
- 1st, Besseggløpet 14 km (8.7 mi), Norway (female course record, 3rd overall)
- 1st, Isfjorden Skyrace 23 km (14 mi), Norway
- 1st, Mefjellet Opp, Vertical km, Norway (2nd overall)
- 3rd, Stranda Fjord Trail Race 25 km (16 mi), Norway
- 3rd, Ultra Pirineu 42 km (26 mi), Spain

==== Skyrunning World Series wins ====
The Skyrunning World Series is a race circuit for mountain running from 2002 and onwards.

#	Season	Date	Race	Discipline
1	2012	22 July	Dolomites SkyRace	SkyRace
2	2013	26 May	Maratòn Alpina Zegama-Aizkorri	SkyRace
3	2013	24 August	Matterhorn Ultraks	SkyRace
4	2013	11 May	Transvulcania	Sky Ultra
5	2013	14 July	Ice Trail Tarentaise	Sky Ultra
6	2013	28 September	Ultra Race of Champions	Sky Ultra
7	2014	13 July	Ice Trail Tarentaise	Sky Ultra
8	2014	11 September	The Rut 50K	Sky Ultra
9	2015	9 May	Transvulcania Ultramarathon	Sky Ultra
10	2015	2 August	Tromsø SkyRace	Sky Ultra
11	2015	6 September	The Rut 50K	Sky Ultra
12	2015	19 September	Ultra Pirineu	Sky Ultra
13	2015	31 July	Blåmann Vertical	Vertical
14	2016	5 August	Blåmann Vertical	Vertical
15	2016	28 August	Kima Trophy	Sky Ultra
16	2017	17 September	Salomon Glen Coe Skyline	Sky Ultra

=== Ski mountaineering ===
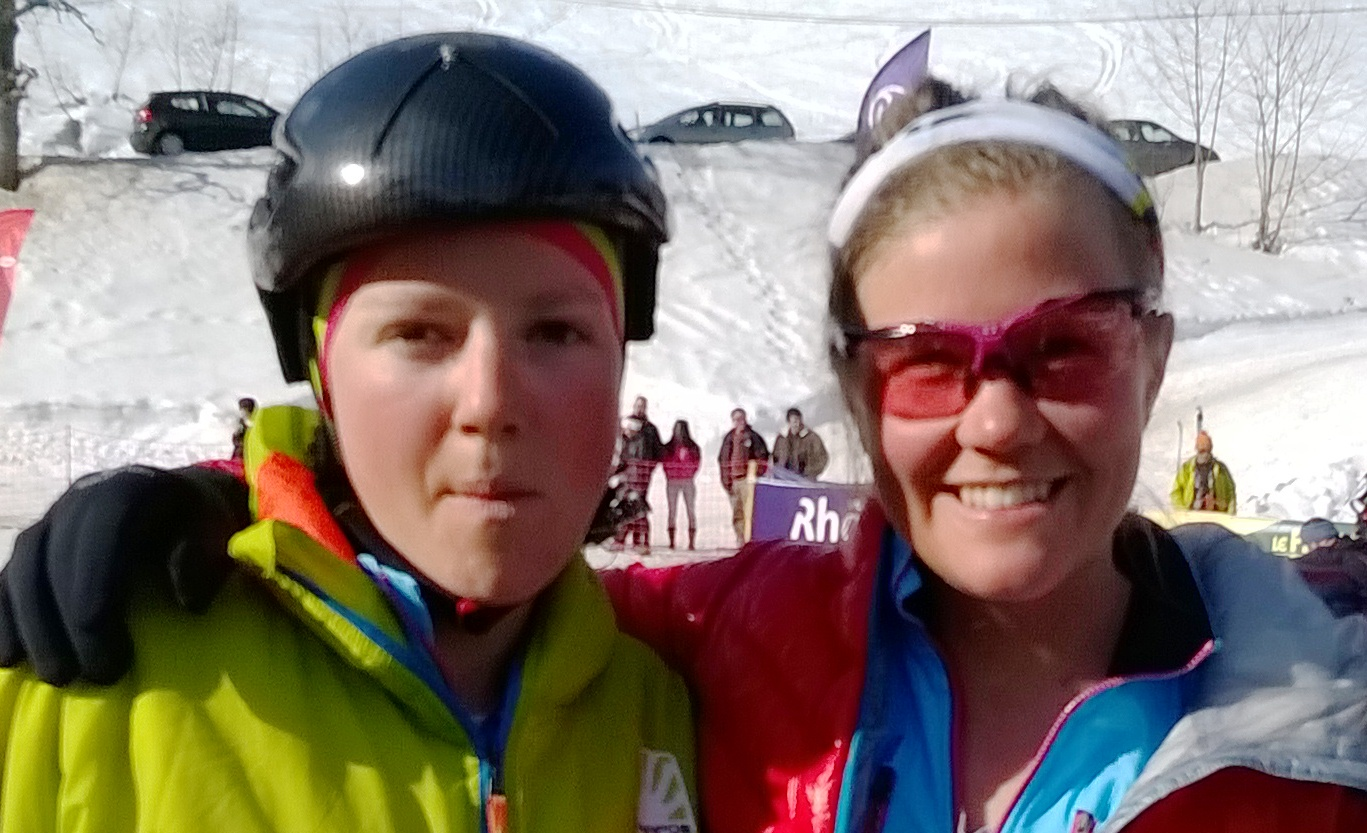
Axelle Mollaret and Emelie Forsberg after winning the first stage of the 2015 Pierra Menta race in France

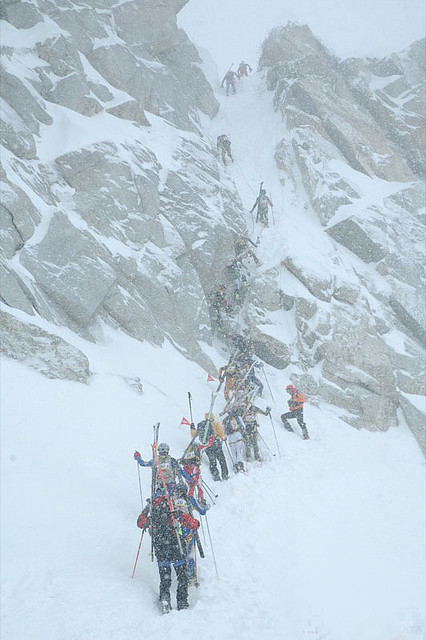
Adamello Ski Raid (2008)

The following list includes Forsberg's results in ISMF ski mountaineering races.

Year	Event	Race result				
Year	Event	Individual	Vertical	Sprint	Team	Teammates
2010	Vértex Vinter Solo, Sweden	2				
2011	Keb Classic, Sweden				2	Linda Berg
2012	Mont Blanc Ski Challenge, France	3				
2012	Expedition Åre Cup, Åre, Sweden	2				
2013	Norwegian Championship, Strengen, Norway	1				
2013	Alpiniski, Switzerland	5		6		
2013	Championnat de France		1			
2013	ISMF World Championship, Pelvoux, France	6	3	3	5	Josefina Wikberg
2013	Blatind Arctic race, Norway			7		
2013	Alpi´Tignes, France		1			
2014	Championnat de France	2				
2014	Verbier Val de Bagnes, France	4	6			
2014	Courchevel, France	5	4			
2014	Diablerets 3D, Italy	3	6			
2014	Ski Alp Race Dolomiti di Brenta, Italy	2				
2014	Blatind Arctic race, Norway	5		4		
2015	Open Vertical Race, Méribel-Mottaret, France		3			
2015	Ski Ecrins, France	11	8	17		
2015	Font Blanca, Andorra	13	4			
2015	ISMF World Championship, Verbier, Switzerland	3	10	10		
2015	Marmotta Trophy, Italy	3		3		
2015	Pierra Menta, France				2	Axelle Mollaret
2015	Mondolè Ski Alp, Italy	2	4	2		
2015	Adamello Ski Raid, Italy				2	Axelle Mollaret
2015	Keb Classic, Sweden				2	Josefina Wikberg, Charlotte Kalla
2015	Trofeo Mezzalama, Italy				1	Axelle Mollaret, Jennifer Fiechter
2015	Mont Blanc Ski Challenge, France	1				
2016	Barlouka's Race, Switzerland		4			
2016	Relais des Chamois, France				1	Ida Nilsson
2016	Championnat de France	1				
2016	Font Blanca, Andorra	1	2			
2016	Valtellina Orobie, Italy	3 (Note: Forsberg was second over the finish line but was penalized two minutes because of equipment failure)		9		
2016	La Reprise, Tignes, France	1				
2016	Norgescup Björli, Norway	1				
2017	Font Blanca, Andorra	3	1			
2017	Catalan Championships, Spain	1				
2017	Cambre d'Aze, France	4		4		
2017	Norgescup Todalen, Norway	1	1			
2017	ISMF World Championship, Tambre/Piancavallo, Italy	4	2	2	7 (Note: Relay race)	Ida Nilsson, Fanny Borgström
2017	Pierra Menta, France				1	Laetitia Roux
2017	Stryn Rando 3000, Norway	1				
2017	Trofeo Mezzalama, Italy				1	Laetitia Roux, Jennifer Fiechter
2017	Vertical Race de Méribel, France		1			
2018	Font Blanca, Andorra		2			
2018	Narvik Rando, Norway	1	1			
2018	ISMF European Championships, Italy	3				
2018	Pierra Menta, France				2	Laetitia Roux
2018	Stryn Rando 3000, Norway	1				
2020	Jennerstier - Berchtesgaden, Germany	8		17		
2022	Norwegian Championship, Vassfjell, Norway	2	2			
2022	Romsdal Rando, Norway	1				

==== World Cup wins ====
#	Season	Date	Race	Discipline
1	2016	16 January	Font Blanca	Individual
2	2017	22 January	Font Blanca	Vertical

==== La Grand Course wins ====
#	Season	Date	Race	Teammate(s)
1	2015	2 May	Trofeo Mezzalama	Axelle Mollaret, Jennifer Fiechter
2	2017	8–11 March	Pierra Menta	Laetitia Roux
3	2017	22 April	Trofeo Mezzalama	Laetitia Roux, Jennifer Fiechter

=== Fastest Known Time (FKT) ===
Forsberg holds the fastest known times on the following routes:

- Grand Teton, Wyoming, USA, Women's FKT up and down, 3h51m, 11 August 2012.
- Mont Blanc, France, Women's FKT up and down from Chamonix, 7h53m12s, 21 June 2018 (improved her previous record of 8h10m from 2013).
- Matterhorn, Italy, Women's FKT up and down, 5h52m, 2013.
- Kebnekaise, Sweden, Women's FKT up and down, 2h00m40s, 7 July 2014. Until 5 August 2014 this was also the Allround FKT.
- Teide, Spain, Women's FKT up and down, 7h06m06s, 23 November 2017.
- Galdhøpiggen, Norway, on ski (from Spiterstulen), Women's FKT up and down 1h45m, 27 April 2018. Most FKT in the list are running, but to Galdhøpiggen was on ski (skis have similar speed uphill but are much faster downhill).
- Monte Rosa, Italy, from Alagna, Women's FKT up and down 5h3m56s, 23 June 2018
- Kungsleden (King of Trails), Allround FKT Abisko - Hemavan, Sweden, 4d 21h 45m 28s, 2–7 July 2018.

== Bibliography ==
- Emelie Forsberg, Sky Runner: Finding Strength, Happiness and Balance in Your Running, Swedish, English, French, Norwegian, Italian, Spanish and Catalan editions, Gawellförlag AB, 2018 ISBN 978-1944515737
- Emelie Forsberg, Ida Nilsson, Mimmi Kotka, Moonvalley DIARIES, Swedish, English and French, Gawellförlag AB, 2019 ISBN 978-9198559804
