= Monte Rosa SkyMarathon =

- Date: June
- Location: (Italy) Alagna Valsesia, Monte Rosa
- Event type: SkyMarathon
- Distance: 35 km - 7,000m +/-
- Established: 1992
- Course records: 4h24'27" (men) 5h34'40" (women)
- Website: www.monterosaskymarathon.com

The Monte Rosa SkyMarathon is an international skyrunning competition held in Alagna Valsesia on Monte Rosa (Italy) which marked the origins of skyrunning.

== History ==
The first edition of the race was in 1992 to and from Alagna, reaching Colle del Lys at 4,250m where the race was turned around due to strong winds. In 1993 and 1994, and from 2018, the race course was from Alagna, 1,192m to the summit of Monte Rosa, 4,554m and back, making it Europe's highest race. (In 1996 the highest point reached was the Gnifetti Hut, 3,647m).

Between 2002 and 2011 the race (also known as Trofeo Stefano Degasparis) took place on a different course to and from Alagna to the Passo dei Salati at 2,980m.

In 2009 the race was valid for the Skyrunner World Series.

When the original course was relaunched in 2018 (the 25th anniversary of the first race to the summit), a new rule was introduced where participants race in teams of two for safety.

The winners of the 2019 edition were Italian William Boffelli with Austrian Jakob Herrmann (men) (4h51'58") and Natalia Tomasiak with Katarzyna Solinska (women) from Poland (6h38'14").

The record holders for the original course (Alagna - Monte Rosa - Alagna) are Italians Fabio Meraldi in 4h24' and Gisella Bendotti in 5h34', both set in 1994. Emelie Forsberg finished in a faster time of 5h03'56" in 2018. She teamed with Kilian Jornet in a mixed gender team which falls into the male category, Bendotti's individual time still stands. Forsberg's time is the best female performance over the course.

== Editions ==
| Year | Max elevation | Men's winner | Women's winner |
|---|---|---|---|
| 1992* | 4,250m | (Italy) Adriano Greco | (Italy) Gisella Bendotti (Italy) Bruna Fanetti |
| 1993 | 4,554m | (Italy) Ettore Champretavy | (Italy) Gisella Bendotti |
| 1994 | 4,554m | (Italy) Fabio Meraldi | (Italy) Gisella Bendotti |
| 1996* | 3,647m | (Italy) Bruno Brunod | (Italy) Gisella Bendotti |
| 2018 | 4,554m | (Italy) Franco Collé (Italy) William Boffelli | (United States) Hillary Gerardi (United Kingdom) Holly Page |
| 2019 | 4,554m | (Austria) Jakob Herrmann (Italy) William Boffelli | (Poland) Natalia Tomasiak (Poland) Katarzyna Solinska |

Legend: *reduced course due to bad weather

== Trofeo Stefano Degasparis ==
From 2002 to 2011 the race took place on a different course from Alagna to the Passo dei Salati at 2,980m and back.

| Year | Max elevation | Men's winner | Women's winner |
|---|---|---|---|
| 2002* | 2,980m | (Italy) Jean Pellissier | (Italy) Gisella Bendotti |
| 2003* | 2,980m | (Italy) Bruno Brunod | (Italy) Gisella Bendotti |
| 2004* | 2,980m | (Italy) Lucio Fregona | (Italy) Gloriana Pellissier |
| 2005* | 2,980m | (Italy) Fulvio Dapit | (Italy) Gisella Bendotti |
| 2006* | 2,980m | (Italy) Lucio Fregona | (Russia) Wera Soukhowa |
| 2007* | 2,980m | (Italy) Lucio Fregona | (Italy) Gisella Bendotti |
| 2008** | 2,980m | (Italy) Paolo Bert | (Italy) Emanuela Brizio |
| 2009 | 2,980m | (Italy) Fulvio Dapit | (Italy) Emanuela Brizio |
| 2010 | 2,980m | (Italy) Tadei Pivk | (Italy) Emanuela Brizio |
| 2011 | 2,980m | (Italy) Fulvio Dapit | (Italy) Gisella Bendotti |

Legend: *28 km course; **reduced course due to snow
