= Natsagdorj Luvsansharav =

Mongolian skyrunner (born 2001)

Personal information
- Nationality: Mongolian

Sport
- Sport: Skyrunning
Medal record
Men's Skyrunning
Representing Mongolia
U-23 World Championships
Gold medal – first place	2023 Fonte Cerreto	Vertical

Natsagdorj Luvsansharav (born 2001) is a Mongolian skyrunner. He took the 2023 U-23 Skyrunning World Championships in the men's 3.8 km long with 1,033m vertical climb, winning the gold medal with a time of 37:28.

Luvsansharav received a silver medal at the 2017 Cadet National Championships in the 5,000 meters.
