= Bhim Gurung =

Nepalese male sky runner (born 1981)

Personal information
- Full name: Bhim Bahadur Gurung
- Nationality: Nepalese
- Born: 22 April 1981 (age 45) Thumi

Sport
- Country: Nepal
- Sport: Skyrunning; Trail running
- Event(s): Vertical Kilometer; SkyMarathon
- Club: Trial Running Nepal

Bhim Gurung (born 22 April 1981) is a Nepalese male sky runner, who won four races of the Skyrunning World Series international circuit, also setting the record in 2016 Kima Trophy.

== Biography ==
In 2017 he was second in Sky Extreme World Cup behind the British Jonathan Albon.

== World Cup wins ==
Race of Skyrunner World Series (4 wins)

Season	Date	Race	Venue	Discipline
2016	30 April	Yading Skyrun	(China) Yading	SkyRace
2016	28 August	Kima Trophy	(Italy) Val Masino	Sky Ultra
2017	2 May	Yading Skyrun	(China) Yading	SkyRace
2017	1 July	Royal Ultra Sky Marathon	(Italy) Ceresole Reale	Sky Ultra
