= Rémi Bonnet =

Swiss runner & ski mountaineer (born 1995)

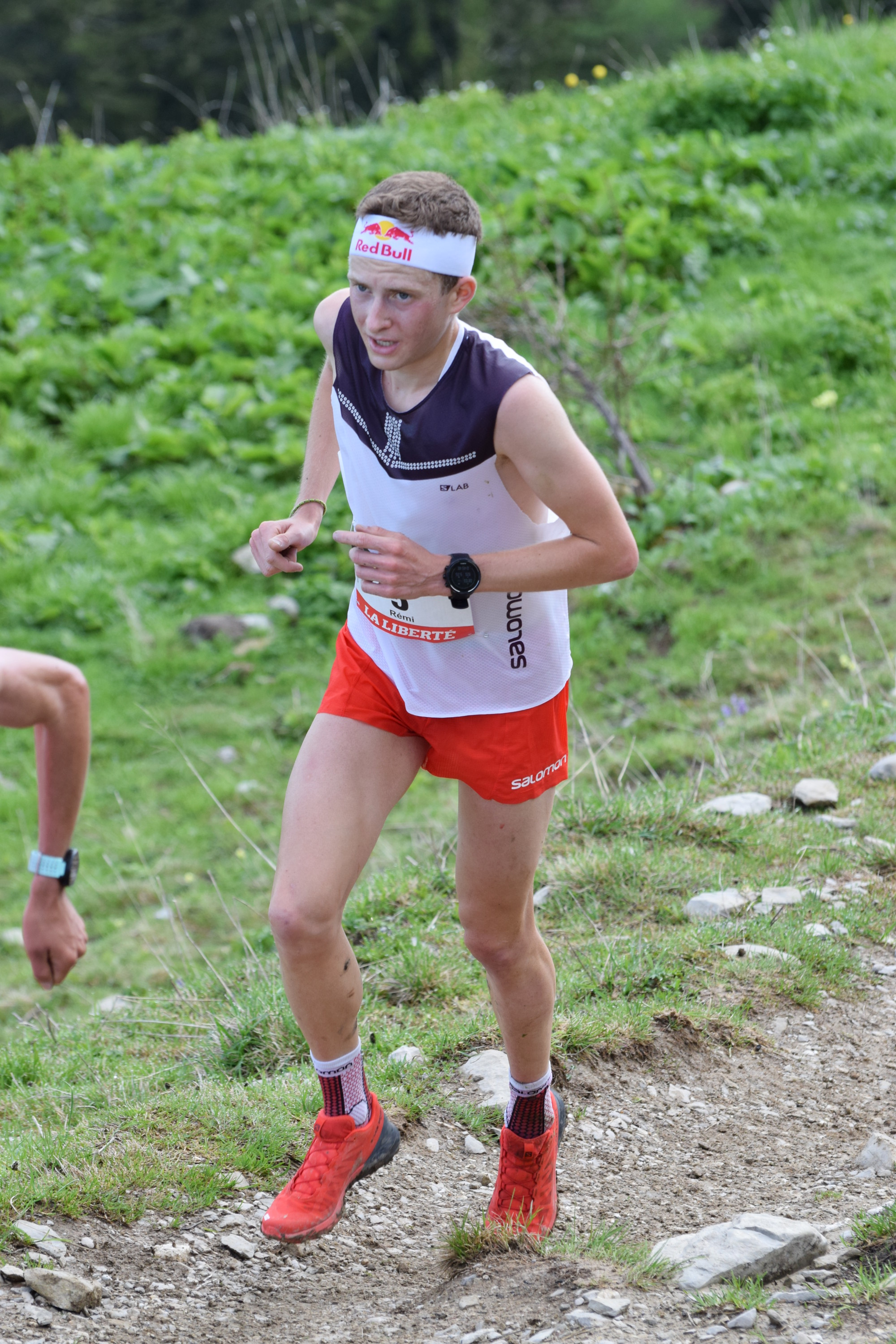

Personal information
- Nationality: Swiss
- Born: 3 March 1995 (age 31) Charmey

Sport
- Country: Switzerland
- Sport: Ski mountaineering Mountain running Skyrunning
- Club: Team Salomon International

Rémi Bonnet (born 3 March 1995) is a Swiss male ski mountaineer, mountain runner, trail runner and sky runner, who won 2015 Skyrunner World Series in the Vertical Kilometer and 2022 Golden Trail Series. He is also the winner of the 2018 Zegama-Aizkorri race and set a course record in the 2023 Pikes Peak Ascent. He also won the Marathon du mont-blanc with the fastest time in 2023. Remi has recorded the highest ever iTRA score by an individual: 970 at Course de montagne Neirivue- Moleson.

== Selected results ==
=== Skyrunning ===
2015

- Champion, Skyrunner World Series (Vertical Kilometer)
- 1st (United States) The Rut 25K
- 1st (Hong Kong) Lantau 2 Peaks
- 1st (Italy) Limone Extreme Vertical Kilometer

2017

- 2nd (Italy) Dolomites Vertical Kilometer

2023

- 1st (United States) Pikes Peak Ascent - new course record of 2:00:20

=== WMTRC - World Mountain and Trail Running championships ===
2025

- Champion, WMTRC - World Mountain and Trail Running (Uphill 6,4 km)
