= The Rut =

American skyrunning race

- Date: September
- Location: (United States) Big Sky, Montana
- Event type: Sky (28 K); Ultra (50 K); Vertical (Lone Peak)
- Distance: 28 km / 2,375 m D+ 50 km / 3,200 m D+ 1,000 m D+
- Established: 2013
- Website: The Rut

The Rut is an international skyrunning competition held for the first time in 2013. It runs every year in Big Sky, Montana (United States) in September and consists of four races, a 50 K, a 25 K, a 11 K (from 2015, before was 12 K) and Vertical Kilometer both valid for the Skyrunner World Series.

== 50 K ==
Race of Skyrunner World Series

Edition	Date	Rank	Men's winner	Time	Rank	Women's winner	Time
1st	14 September 2013	1st	(United States) Paul Hamilton	5:13:08.4	23rd	(United States) Erin Phelps	6:43:51.1
2nd	13 September 2014	1st	(Spain) Kilian Jornet	5:09:31.43	29th	(Sweden) Emelie Forsberg	6:32:39.57
3rd	6 September 2015	1st	(Italy) Franco Collé	5:16:58.53	21st	(Sweden) Emelie Forsberg	6:25:44.21
4th	4 September 2016	1st	(Spain) Cristofer Clemente	3:51:52.55	21st	(Sweden) Ida Nilsson	4:27:29.46
5th	3 September 2017	1st	(Spain) Luis Alberto Hernando	5:10:15.95	13th	(Netherlands) Ragna Debats	6:13:55.81
6th	2 September 2018	1st	(United States) Jackson Brill	5:17:54.64	12th	(United States) Sandra Nypaver	6:13:35.70
7th	1 September 2019	1st	(United States) Cody Lind	5:29:44.85	19th	(United States) Erika Flowers	6:51:52.41

== 28 K / 25 K ==
Race of Skyrunner World Series

Edition	Date	Rank	Men's winner	Time	Rank	Women's winner	Time
1st	6 September 2015	1st	(Switzerland) Remi Bonnet	2:58:55	13th	(United States) Megan Kimmel	3:35:04
2nd	4 September 2016	1st	(Spain) Hassan Ait Chaou	3:06:39	12th	(United States) Megan Kimmel	3:36:23
3rd (28 K)	3 September 2017	1st	(Spain) Aritz Egea Caceres	3:15:49.83	13th	(Spain) Laura Orgué	3:50:12.37
4th (28 K)	1 September 2018	1st	(Switzerland) Pascal Egli	3:06:52.57	12th	(United Kingdom) Holly Page	3:42:06.51
5th (28 K)	31 August 2019	1st	(United States) David Sinclair	3:11:53.50	15th	(United States) Ann Spencer	3:59:32.68

== 11 K / 12 K ==
Edition	Date	Rank	Men's winner	Time	Rank	Women's winner	Time
1st	14 September 2013	1st	(United States) Joshua Pummel	54:21	5th	(United States) Kala Jauquet	1:07:26.6
2nd	13 September 2014	1st	(United States) Craig Hertz	51:30.93	8th	(United States) Cynthia Arnold	58:00.51
3rd (11 K)	6 September 2015	1st	(United States) Jake Neil	53:40:00	4th	(United States) Stevie Kremer	54:29.96
4th (11 K)	4 September 2016	1st	(United States) Forrest Bouge	51:35.39	10th	(United States) Nicole Hunt	59:25.49
5th (11 K)	3 September 2017	1st	(United States) Matt Rock	54:08.40	7th	(United States) Nicole Murray	1:01:51
6th (11k)	2 September 2018	1st	(United States) Jesse Carnes	55:08.70	4th	(United Kingdom) Holly Page	57:27.16
7th (11 K)	1 September 2019	1st	(United States) Patrick Carrier	53:36.24	6th	(United States) Kelsey Walnum	1:01:12.77

== Lone Peak Vertical Kilometer ==
Edition	Date	Rank	Men's winner	Time	Rank	Women's winner	Time
1st	13 September 2014	1st	(Spain) Kilian Jornet	46:12	20th	(Andorra) Stephanie Jimenez	1:02:13
2nd	6 September 2015	1st	(Switzerland) Remi Bonnet	45:58	9th	(Spain) Laura Orgué	52:20
3rd	4 September 2016	1st	(Czech Republic) Ondrej Fejfar	29:25.30	16th	(Spain) Laura Orgue	34:19.61
4th	3 September 2017	1st	(United States) J.P. Donovan	47:27	15th	(Spain) Laura Orgué	54:49
5th	31 August 2018	1st	(United States) Jeff Rome	49:32.81	32nd	(United States) Emmiliese Von Clemm	1:01:43.37
6th	30 August 2019	1st	(United States) Jeff Rome	49:31.46	21st	(United States) Emma Tarbath	59:05.41

== See also ==
- Skyrunner World Series
