= Dolomites SkyRace =

- Date: July
- Location: (Italy) Dolomites
- Event type: SkyRace; Vertical Kilometer
- Distance: 23.5 km / 1,950 m D+ 2.7 km / 1,100 m D+
- Established: 1998
- Website: Dolomites SkyRace

The Dolomites SkyRace is an international skyrunning competition held for the first time in 1998. It runs every year in Italian Dolomites in July and consists of two races SkyRace and Vertical Kilometer both valid for the Skyrunner World Series.

== Dolomites SkyRace ==
=== Men ===
Year	Winner	Second	Third
1998	(Italy) Fabio Meraldi	(Italy) Fausto Bordiga	(Italy) Pio Tomaselli
1999	(Italy) Jean Pellisier	(Italy) Fausto Bordiga	(Italy) Aldo Guadagnini
2000	(Italy) Fausto Bordiga	(Italy) Fabio Bonfanti	(Italy) Paolo Larger
2001	(Italy) Paolo Larger	(Italy) Luigino Bortoluzzi	(Italy) Andrea Martinelli
2002	(Italy) Lucio Fregona	(Italy) Paolo Larger	(Italy) Ettore Girardi
2003	(Colombia) Saul Padua	(Italy) Paolo Larger	(Italy) Martin Planker
2004	(Italy) Fulvio Dapit	(Italy) Bruno Brunod	(Italy) Michele Tavernaro
2005	(Italy) Michele Tavernaro	(United Kingdom) Simon Booth	(United Kingdom) Rob Jebb
2006	(Spain) Agustì Roc Amador	(United Kingdom) Rob Jebb	(Italy) Matteo Piller Hoffer
2007	(Slovenia) Mitja Kosovelj	(Spain) Tofol Castanyer Bernat	(Spain) Agustì Roc Amador
2008	(Spain) Kílian Jornet Burgada	(Spain) Tofol Castanyer Bernat	(Italy) Tadei Pivk
2009	(Spain) Raul Garcia Castan	(Italy) Dennis Brunod	(Italy) Giovanni Tacchini
2010	(Italy) Paolo Larger	(Italy) Michele Tavernaro	(Italy) Fulvio Dapit
2011	(Spain) Luis Alberto Hernando	(Spain) Miguel Caballero Ortega	(Italy) Michele Tavernaro
2012	(Spain) Kílian Jornet Burgada	(Romania) Ionut Zinca	(Slovenia) Mitja Kosovelj
2013	(Spain) Kílian Jornet Burgada	(Italy) Marco De Gasperi	(Italy) Tadei Pivk
2014	(Spain) Kílian Jornet Burgada	(Romania) Ionut Zinca	(Italy) Tadei Pivk
2015	(Italy) Tadei Pivk	(Romania) Ionut Zinca	(Switzerland) Egli Pascal
2016	(Italy) Tadei Pivk	(Norway) Stian Overgaard Aarvik	(Switzerland) Martin Anthamatten
2017	(Spain) Jan Margarit Sole	(Italy) Davide Magnini	(Italy) Marco De Gasperi
2018	(Norway) Stian Angermund	(Norway) Stian Overgaard Aarvik	(Italy) Nadir Maguet
2019	(Italy) Davide Magnini	(Italy) Nadir Maguet	(Morocco) Elhousine Elazzaoui
2020	(Italy) ... ...	(Italy) ... ...	(Italy) ... ...
2021	(Italy) ... ...	(Italy) ... ...	(Italy) ... ...
2022	(Italy) ... ...	(Italy) ... ...	(Italy) ... ...

=== Women ===
Year	Winner	Second	Third
1998	(Italy) Morena Paieri	(Italy) Silvana Iori	(Italy) Daniela Gilardi
1999	(Italy) Morena Paieri	(Spain) Teresa Rocca I Casas	(Italy) Teresa Forn I Munnè
2000	(Italy) Daniela Gilardi	(Italy) Silvana Iori	(Italy) Vera Derrigo
2001	(Italy) Michela Benzoni	(Italy) Annamaria Garelli	(Italy) Armanda Maruzzi
2002	(Italy) Silvana Iori	(Italy) Mariagiulia Canello	(Italy) Rizzi Michela
2003	(Italy) Giovanna Cerutti	(Italy) Cristina Paluselli	(Italy) Mariagiulia Canello
2004	(Spain) Anna Serra	(Italy) Emanuela Brizio	(United Kingdom) Ruth Pickvance
2005	(France) Corinne Favre	(Italy) Emanuela Brizio	(Italy) Anna Serra Salame
2006	(United Kingdom) Angela Mudge	(France) Corinne Favre	(Italy) Paola Romanin
2007	(United Kingdom) Angela Mudge	(Andorra) Stephanie Jimenez	(Italy) Paola Romanin
2008	(Italy) Antonella Confortola	(Andorra) Stephanie Jimenez	(Italy) Pierangela Baronchelli
2009	(Italy) Antonella Confortola	(Spain) Monica Ardid Ubed	(Italy) Nadia Scola
2010	(France) Laetitia Roux	(United Kingdom) Angela Mudge	(Andorra) Stephanie Jimenez
2011	(Spain) Mireia Mirò	(Spain) Oihana Kortazar	(United States) Brandy Erholtz
2012	(Sweden) Emelie Forsberg	(United States) Kasie Enman	(Spain) Mireia Mirò
2013	(Sweden) Emelie Forsberg	(Italy) Silvia Serafini	(Spain) Nu Dominguez Azpeleta
2014	(Spain) Laura Orgué	(Sweden) Emelie Forsberg	(Spain) Maite Maiora
2015	(United States) Megan Kimmel	(Spain) Laura Orgué	(Italy) Elisa Desco
2016	(Spain) Laura Orgué	(Italy) Elisa Desco	(France) Celia Chiron
2017	(Spain) Laura Orgué	(United States) Hillary Gerardi	(Norway) Hilde Ardes
2018	(Spain) Laura Orgué	(United States) Hillary Gerardi	(Sweden) Sanna El Kott Helander
2019	(Switzerland) Judith Wyder	(New Zealand) Ruth Croft	(Switzerland) Maude Mathys

== Dolomites Vertical Kilometer ==
=== Men ===
Year	Winner	Second	Third
2008	(Italy) Manfred Reichegger	(Spain) Agustì Roc Amador	(Italy) Urban Zemmer
2009	(Italy) Urban Zemmer	(Spain) Agustì Roc Amador	(Italy) Manfred Reichegger
2010	(Italy) Urban Zemmer	(Italy) Nicola Golinelli	(Italy) Manfred Reichegger
2011	(Italy) Urban Zemmer	(Slovenia) Nejc Kuhar	(Italy) Alessandro Follador
2012	(Slovenia) Nejc Kuhar	(Spain) Saul Padua Rodriguez	(Spain) Kilian Jornet Burgada
2013	(Spain) Kilian Jornet Burgada	(Italy) Urban Zemmer	(Italy) Philip Götsch
2014	(Italy) Urban Zemmer	(Slovenia) Nejc Kuhar	(Italy) Marco Moletto
2015	(Italy) Philip Götsch	(Italy) Urban Zemmer	(Spain) Saul Padua Rodriguez
2016	(Italy) Philip Götsch	(Slovenia) Nejc Kuhar	(Italy) Hannes Perkmann
2017	(Italy) Patrick Facchini	(Switzerland) Remi Bonnet	(Slovenia) Nejc Kuhar
2018	(Italy) Davide Magnini	(Italy) Nadir Maguet	(Slovenia) Nejc Kuhar
2019	(Italy) Davide Magnini	(Switzerland) Rémi Bonnet	(Italy) Hannes Perkmann

=== Women ===
Year	Winner	Second	Third
2008	(Italy) Antonella Confortola	(Italy) Pierangela Baronchelli	(Spain) Gemma Arrò Ribot
2009	(Italy) Antonella Confortola	(United Kingdom) Angela Mudge	(Spain) Monica Ardid Ubed
2010	(France) Laetitia Roux	(Italy) Antonella Confortola	(United Kingdom) Angela Mudge
2011	(Italy) Nadia Scola	(Italy) Alessandra Valgoi	(Italy) Francesca Simoni
2012	(Italy) Antonella Confortola	(Spain) Mireia Mirò	(Spain) Blanca Maria Serrano
2013	(Italy) Antonella Confortola	(Sweden) Emelie Forsberg	(Czech Republic) Iva Milesova
2014	(Spain) Laura Orguè Vila	(France) Christel Dewalle	(Italy) Antonella Confortola
2015	(France) Christel Dewalle	(Norway) Eli Anne Dvergsdal	(Spain) Laura Orguè Vila
2016	(Spain) Laura Orguè Vila	(Italy) Valentina Belotti	(Italy) Francesca Rossi
2017	(France) Axelle Mollaret	(Finland) Susanna Saapunki	(Switzerland) Victoria Kreuzer
2018	(Switzerland) Victoria Kreuzer	(Sweden) Lina El Kott Helander	(Spain) Laura Orgué
2019	(Switzerland) Victoria Kreuzer	(Italy) Valentina Belotti	(Finland) Susanna Saapunki

== See also ==
- Skyrunner World Series
