= Ultra SkyMarathon Madeira =

- Date: June
- Location: (Portugal) Madeira
- Event type: Ultra SkyMarathon
- Distance: 55.6 km / 5,121 m
- Established: 2014
- Website: Ultra SkyMarathon Madeira

The Ultra SkyMarathon Madeira is an international skyrunning competition held for the first time in 2014. It runs every year in Madeira (Portugal) in July. The race is valid for the Skyrunner World Series.

== Races ==
- Ultra SkyMarathon Madeira, an Ultra SkyMarathon (55.6 km / 5,121 m elevation)
- Santana Sky Race, a SkyRace (23 km / 1,672 m elevation)
- Quinta do Furão Mini Sky Race, a mini SkyRace (13 km / 655 m elevation)
- Santana Vertical Kilometer, a Vertical Kilometer (4.8 km / 1,003 m elevation)

== Ultra SkyMarathon Madeira ==
Race of Skyrunner World Series

Year	Date	Men's winner	Women's winner
2014	21 September	(Portugal) Manuel Faria	(Portugal) Ester Alves
2015	5 August	(United Kingdom) Ricky Lightfoot	(United States) Stevie Kremer
2016	4 June	(Spain) Cristofer Clemente	(Spain) Gemma Arenas
2017	4 June	(United Kingdom) Jonathan Albon	(United States) Hillary Allen

== See also ==
- Skyrunner World Series
