= Buff Epic Trail =

- Date: July
- Location: (Spain) Barruera
- Event type: Sky Ultra
- Distance: 105 km / 5,600 m
- Established: 2014
- Website: Buff Epic Trail

The Buff Epic Trail is an international skyrunning competition held for the first time in 2016. It runs every year in Barruera, Catalonia (Spain) in July. The race is valid for the Skyrunner World Series.

== Races ==
- Buff Epic Trail, an Ultra SkyMarathon (65 km / 5,600 m elevation)
- Buff Epic Trail 42 km, a SkyMarathon (42 km / 3,200 m elevation)
- Buff Epic Trail 22 km, a half SkyMarathon (21 km / 1,879 m elevation)
- Buff Epic Trail 10 km, a Vertical Kilometer (10 km / 800 m elevation)

== Buff Epic Trail 105 km ==
Race of Skyrunner World Series
Race was Ultra SkyMarathon title of the 2016 Skyrunning World Championships

Year	Date	Men's winner	Time	Women's winner	Time
2014	2 August	(Spain) Iker Karrera	13:41:25	(Spain) Núria Picas	16:40:32
2015	12 July	(Spain) Sebas Sánchez Sáez	13:38:06	(Spain) Núria Picas	15:49:38
2016	26 July	(Spain) Luis Alberto Hernando	11:36:20	(France) Caroline Chaverot	13:13:00
2017	9 July	(Spain) Gerard Morales Ramirez	13:27:22	(Spain) Judit Franch Pons	9:37:44

== See also ==
- Skyrunner World Series
