= Sheila Avilés =

Spanish sky runner

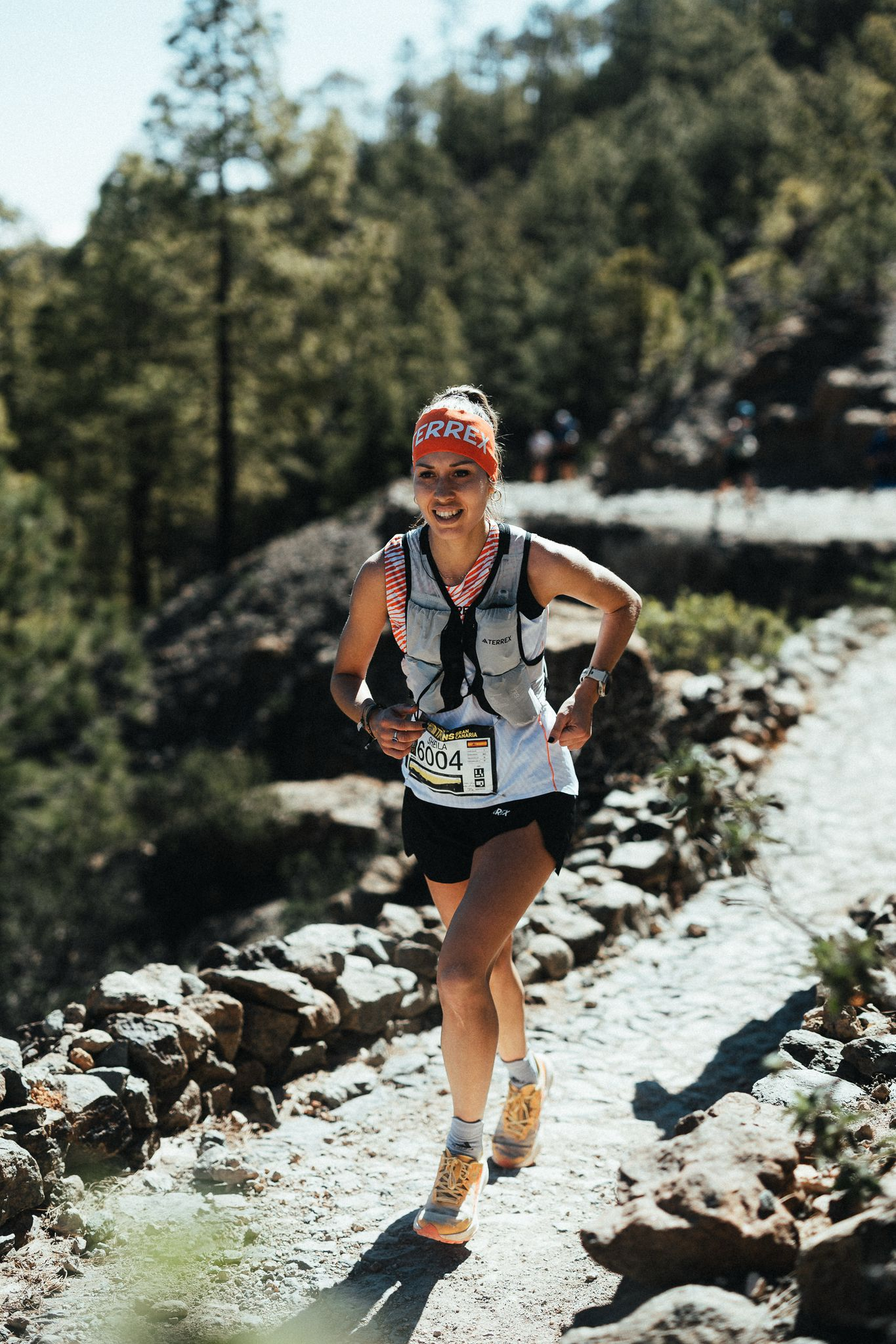

Personal information
- Full name: Sheila Avilés Castaño
- Nickname: avilés castaño
- Nationality: Spanish
- Born: 7 July 1993 (age 32) Santa Margarida de Montbui
- Height: 167 cm (5 ft 6 in)

Sport
- Country: Spain
- Sport: Skyrunning.
- Club: La cameta Coixa

Achievements and titles
- World finals: 1 Sky World Cup: 2017
Medal record
European Championships
Bronze medal – third place	2017 Zeanuri	SkyRace

Sheila Avilés (born 7 July 1993) is a Spanish female sky runner, who won 2017 & 2019 Skyrunner World Series in Sky Classic.

== Biography ==
In 2017 she won also bronze medal at the Skyrunning European Championships.

== World Cup wins ==
Race of Skyrunner World Series (1 win)

Season	Date	Race	Venue	Discipline
2017	30 July	SkyRace Comapedrosa	(Andorra) Arinsal	Sky Classic
