= Devil's Ridge Ultra =

International skyrunning competition

- Date: September
- Location: (China) Gobi Desert
- Event type: Ultra SkyMarathon
- Distance: 60 km / 2,154 m
- Established: 2016
- Website: Devil’s Ridge Ultra

The Devil's Ridge Ultra (a race of the China Mountain Trails such as the Yading Skyrun) is an international skyrunning competition held for the first time in 2016. It runs every year in September in the Gobi Desert (China), and is valid for the Skyrunner World Series.

== Races ==
- Devil’s Ridge 30, a SkyRace (30 km / 781 m D+)
- Devil’s Ridge 60, an Ultra SkyMarathon (60 km / 2154 m D+)

== Devil’s Ridge Ultra ==
Race of Skyrunner World Series

Year	Date	Men's winner	Women's winner
2016	10 September	(China) Yun Yanqiao	(Australia) Lucy Bartholomew
2017	9 September	(China) Qi Min	(Italy) Francesca Canepa

== See also ==
- Skyrunner World Series
- Yading Skyrun
