= Tadei Pivk =

Italian male sky runner (born 1981)

Personal information
- Nationality: Italian
- Born: 20 July 1981 (age 44) Gemona

Sport
- Country: Italy
- Sport: Skyrunning

Achievements and titles
- World finals: 2 Skyrunning World Cup: SkyRace (2015, 2016)
Medal record
Skyrunning
European Championships
Gold medal – first place	2015 Zegama	SkyRace
Bronze medal – third place	2013 Canazei	SkyRace
SkySnow
World Championships
Gold medal – first place	2024 Tarvisio	Vertical

Tadei Pivk (born 20 July 1981) is an Italian male sky runner, who won two Skyrunning World Cup in the SkyRace (2015, 2016).

== Biography ==
He won 2015 Skyrunner World Series and 2016 Skyrunner World Series in SkyRace category.

== Selected results ==
Skyrunning
Year	Rank	Race	Competition
2008	3rd place, bronze medalist(s)	(Italy) Dolomites SkyRace	
2013	3rd place, bronze medalist(s)	(Italy) Dolomites SkyRace	
2014	3rd place, bronze medalist(s)	(Italy) Dolomites SkyRace	
2015	1st place, gold medalist(s)	(Spain) Zegama-Aizkorri	
2015	1st place, gold medalist(s)	(Italy) Dolomites SkyRace	Skyrunner World Series
2016	1st place, gold medalist(s)	(Italy) Livigno SkyMarathon	Skyrunner World Series
2016	1st place, gold medalist(s)	(Italy) Dolomites SkyRace	Skyrunner World Series
2017	1st place, gold medalist(s)	(Italy) Livigno SkyMarathon	Skyrunner World Series

== National titles ==
- Italian Long Distance Mountain Running Championships
  - Long distance mountain running: 2013
- Italian Skyrunning Championships
  - Overall: 2010
  - SkyRace: 2013, 2014
  - SkyMarathon: 2012, 2015, 2016
