= Royal Ultra Sky Marathon =

International skyrunning marathon

- Date: July
- Location: (Italy) Ceresole Reale
- Event type: Ultra SkyMarathon
- Distance: 55 km / 4,141 m
- Established: 2008
- Website: Royal Ultra Sky Marathon

The Royal Ultra Sky Marathon (also known as Royal Gran Paradiso), is an international skyrunning competition held for the first time in 2008. It runs every two years (the SkyRace since 2011) in Ceresole Reale (Italy) in July and consists of two races, the Ultra is valid for the Skyrunner World Series.

== Races ==
- Royal Ultra Sky Marathon, an Ultra SkyMarathon (55 km / 4,141 m vertical climb)
- Roc Sky Race, a SkyRace (31 km / 2,000 m vertical climb)

== Royal Ultra Sky Marathon ==
Royal Ultra Sky Marathon 2008 (46 km – 3600m D+)
Pos	Men		Women	
1st	Marco Aima Boot	5h 55min	Raffaella Miravalle	6h 42min
2nd	Roberto Giacchetto	6h 40min	Lara Cuneo	9h 13min
3rd	Mauro Saroglia	6h 58min		
Royal Ultra Sky Marathon 2009 (46 km – 3600 m D+)
1st	Gian Maria Actis Grosso	6h 09′ 17”	Raffaella Miravalle	6h 03′ 04′
2nd	Simone Milano	6h 20′ 17”	Rosanna Mattè	8h 23′ 30”
3rd	Giuseppe Di Toma	6h 25′ 41”	Mara Salgarella	8h 47′ 31”
Royal Ultra Sky Marathon 2010 (54 km – 2000m D+)
1st	Roberto Giacchetto	7h 40′ 30”	Raffaella Miravalle	8h 04′ 24′
2nd	Francesco Zucconi	7h 57′ 17”	Rosanna Mattè	11h 35′ 12”
3rd		8h 08′ 12”		
Royal Ultra Sky Marathon 2011 (54 km – 4000m D+)
1st	Giuliano Cavallo	7h 19’06”	Raffaella Miravalle	8h 11′ 13”
2nd	Marco Zanchi	7h 19′ 31”	Simonetta Castelli	9h 56′ 39”
3rd	Maurizio Fenaroli	7h 22′ 23”	Stefania Albanese	11h 29′ 05”
Royal Ultra Sky Marathon 2013 (52 km – 4000m D+)
1st	Maurizio Fenaroli	6h 31’49”	Emanuela Brizio	7h 13′ 19”
2nd	Clemente Berlinghieri	6h 34′ 58”	Raffaella Miravalle	7h 50′ 33”
3rd	Claudio Garnier	6h 37′ 20”	Cecilia Mora	8h 01′ 15”
Royal Ultra Sky Marathon 2015 (52 km – 4000m D+)
1st	Fulvio Dapit	6h 33’58”	Raffaella Miravalle	7h 04′ 50”
2nd	Giuliano Cavallo	6h 42′ 04”	Emanuela Brizio	7h 32′ 42”
3rd	Claudio Garnier	6h 43′ 13”	Emanuela Manzoli	9h 16′ 36”
Royal Ultra Sky Marathon 2017 (55 km – 4141 m D+)
1st	Bhim Gurung	6h 41′ 24”	Maite Maiora	8h 05′ 28”
2nd	André Jonsson	6h 51′ 37”	Katie Schide	8h 37′ 02”
3rd	Pere Aurell Bové	6h 52′ 48”	Ekaterina Mityaeva	8h 48′ 23”

== Roc Sky Race ==
Roc Sky Race 2011 (27 km – 2000m D+)
Pos	Men		Women	
1st	Alfonso Bracco	3h 52′ 14”	Marina Plavan	4h 43′ 41”
2nd	Francesco Scimadore	4h 00′ 14”	Morena Almonti	4h 48′ 42”
3rd	Emanuele Gervasoni	4h 07′ 50”	Raffaella Gianotti	4h 49′ 47”
Roc Sky Race 2013 (30 km – 2000 m D+)
1st	Andrea Basolo	3h 40′ 46”	Lisa Borzani	5h 43′ 23”
2nd	Alfonso Bracco	3h 40′ 46”	Martha Kazimierczak	5h 43′ 50”
3rd	Adrian Rodriguez Caballero	3h 58′ 55”	Chiara Boggio	6h 06′ 35”
Roc Sky Race 2015 (30 km – 2000 m D+)
1st	Maurizio Fenaroli	3h 25′ 52”	Isabella Lucchini	4h 50′ 15”
2nd	Alfonso Bracco	3h 37′ 05”	Morena Almonti	5h 06′ 33”
3rd	Luca Carrara	3h 51′ 06”	Sara Ferraro	5h 07′ 43”
Roc Sky Race 2017 (30 km – 2000 m D+)
1st	Luca Carrara	3h 32′ 42”	Cecilia Basso	4h 26′ 27”
2nd	Emmanuel Ranchin	3h 40′ 01”	Giuliana Arrigoni	4h 45′ 44”
3rd	Nicolas D’Oliveira	3h 54′ 29”	Susan Ostano	5h 02′ 31”

== See also ==
- Skyrunner World Series
- Gran Paradiso National Park
