= Yading Skyrun =

Skyrunning competition in Sichuan, China

- Date: April
- Location: (China) Yading
- Event type: SkyRace
- Distance: 29 km / 2345 m
- Established: 2016
- Website: Yading Skyrun

The Yading Skyrun is an international skyrunning competition held for the first time in 2016. It runs every year in Yading (China) at the end of April or beginning of May. The race is valid for the Skyrunner World Series.

== Races ==
- Yading Skyrun, a SkyRace (29 km / 2345 m elevation)
- Yading Kora Ultra, an Ultra SkyMarathon (46 km / 2955 m elevation)
- Yading VK, a Vertical Kilometer (7 km / 1072 m elevation)

== Yading Skyrun ==
Race of Skyrunner World Series

Year	Date	Men's winner	Women's winner
2016	30 April	(Nepal) Bhim Gurung	(United States) Megan Kimmel
2017	2 May	(Nepal) Bhim Gurung	(United States) Megan Kimmel
2018	30 April	(Andorra) Oscar Casal Mir	(United Kingdom) Holly Page
2019	5 May	(China) Jia'e Renjia	(United States) Megan Kimmel

== Yading Kora Ultra ==
Year	Date	Men's winner	Women's winner
2016	30 April		
2017	2 May	(China) Min Qi	(Sweden) Ida Nilsson

== Yading VK ==
Year	Date	Men's winner	Women's winner
2016	29 April		
2017	1 May	(China) Duo Ji	(Sweden) Ida Nilsson

== See also ==
- Skyrunner World Series
