= Cristofer Clemente =

Spanish male trail runner and sky runner

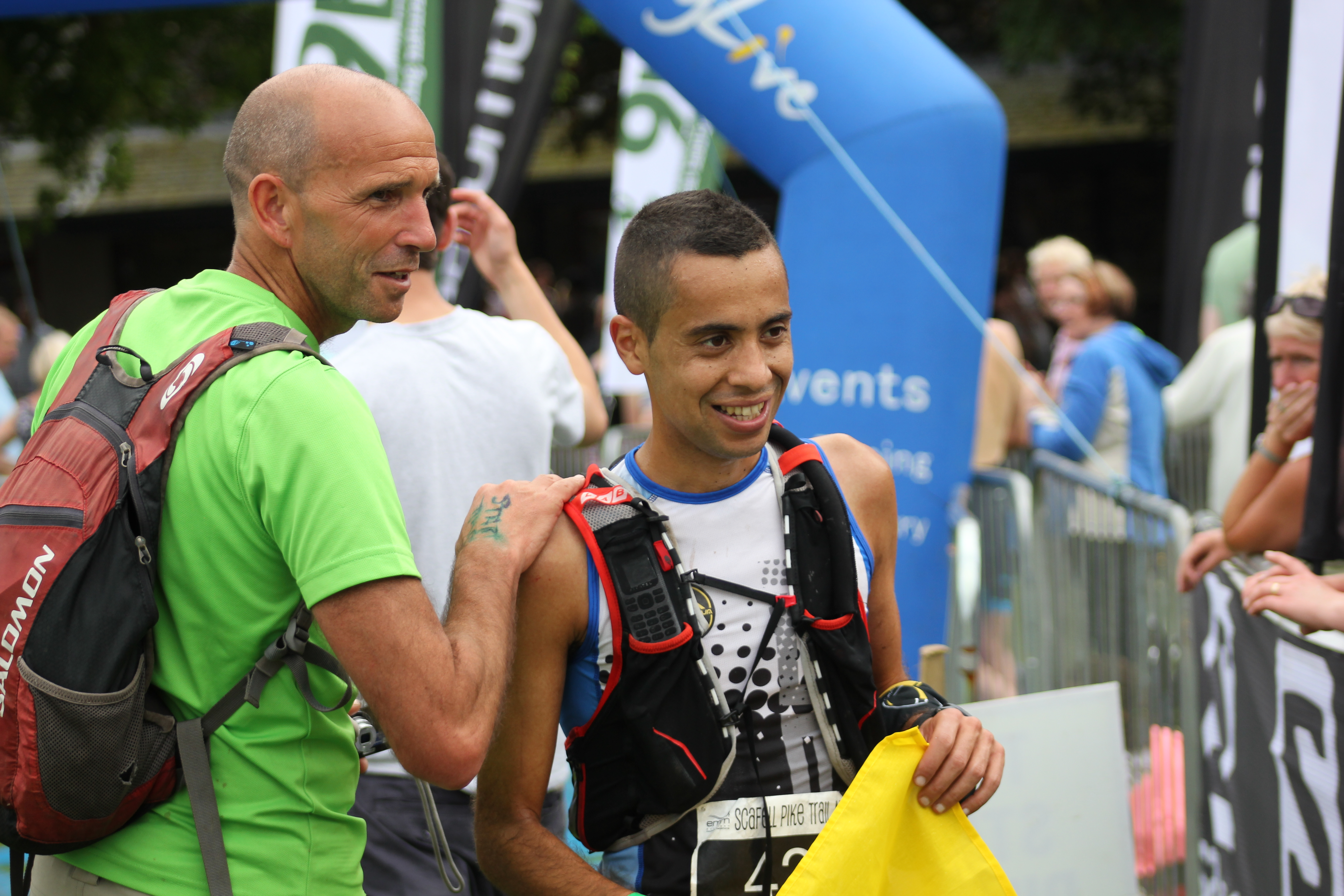
- Clemente at 2014 Scafell Pike Marathon

Personal information
- Full name: Cristofer Clemente Mora
- Nationality: Spanish
- Born: 15 October 1985 (age 40) San Sebastián de La Gomera

Sport
- Country: Spain
- Sport: Trail running Skyrunning
Medal record
Trail running
World Championships
Silver medal – second place	2017 Badia Prataglia	Individual

Cristofer Clemente Mora (Note: In this Spanish name, the first or paternal surname is Clemente and the second or maternal family name is Mora.) (born 15 October 1985) is a Spanish male trail runner and sky runner, who won 2016 Skyrunner World Series in the Sky Ultra and silver medal at the 2017 IAU Trail World Championships held in Badia Prataglia.
