= Dynafit =

Austrian ski equipment company

Dynafit is an Austrian sports company that manufactures skis, ski bindings, and ski boots. Skier Fritz Barthel invented the pin bindings (also known as tech bindings) and patented them in 1983, partnering with Dynafit in 1989 to manufacture his product at scale. As the bindings enabled the skier to switch between locked and free heels for ascending and descending terrain, were lighter the alternative frame bindings, and supported release, they became the most popular ski binding for alpine touring. Since the expiration of the patent in 2016, similar bindings are now produced by other companies.
