= Livigno SkyMarathon =

The Livigno SkyMarathon is an international skyrunning competition held for the first time in 2016. It ran every year until 2024 in Livigno (Italy) in June and is valid for the Skyrunner World Series.

The organizing committee released an official statement on December 9, 2024, announcing that the high-altitude race was stepping out of the summer sports program in Livigno, Italy, to make room for new events.

== Editions ==
SkyRace characteristics: 34 km and 2700 m climbing.

Race of Skyrunner World Series

Year	Date	Men's winner	Women's winner
2016	26 June	(Italy) Tadei Pivk	(Italy) Elisa Desco
2017	18 June	(Italy) Tadei Pivk	(Spain) Maite Maiora

== See also ==
- Skyrunner World Series
