= Philip Götsch =

Italian sky runner

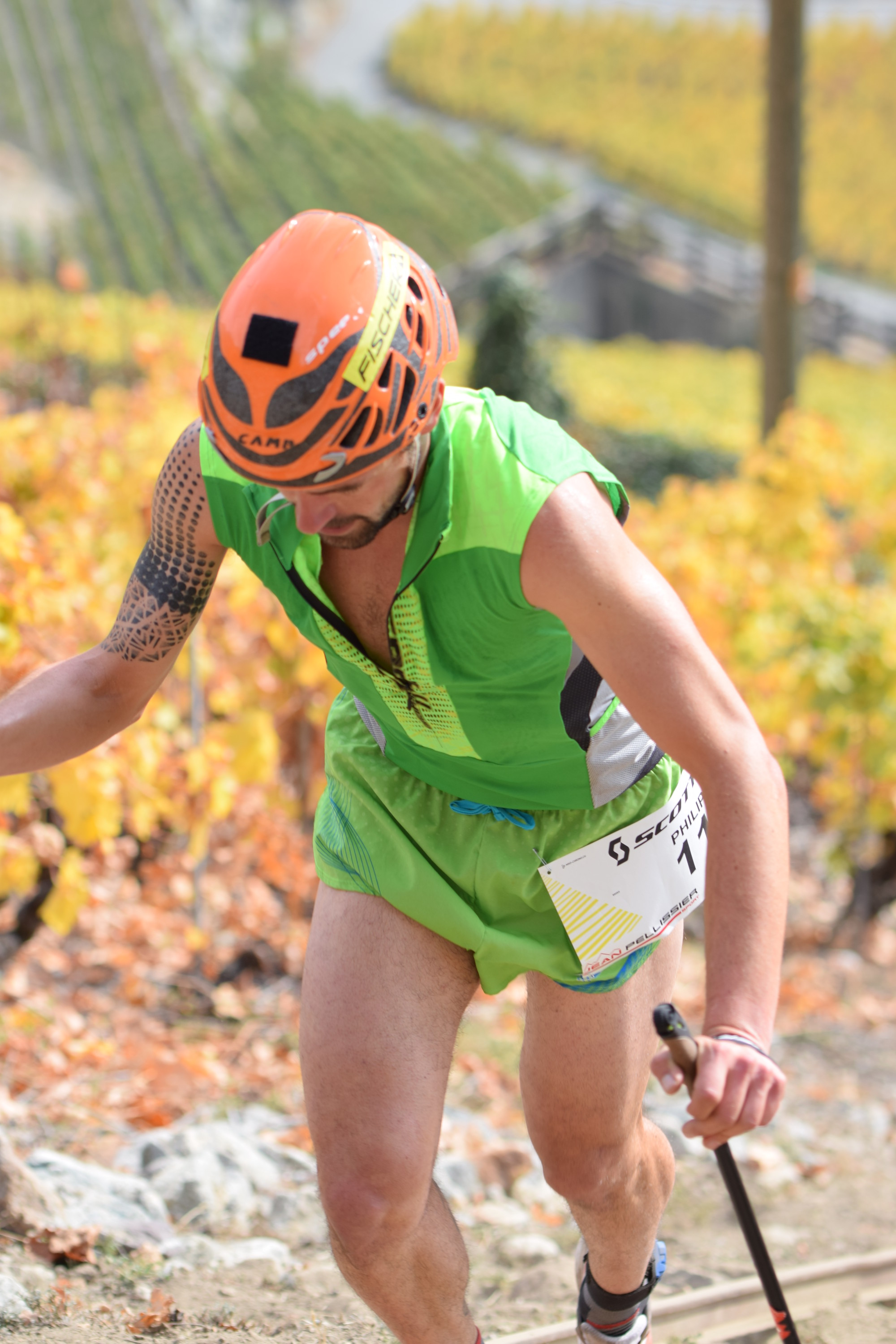
- Philip Götsch at 2017 kilomètre vertical de Fully

Personal information
- Nationality: Italian
- Born: 20 July 1984 (age 41)

Sport
- Country: Italy
- Sport: Skyrunning
- Club: Team Bogn da Nia/Crazy idea

Achievements and titles
- World finals: 1 Skyrunning World Cup: Vertical Kilometer (2016)
Medal record
Skyrunning
European Championships
Gold medal – first place	2016 Limone	Vertical Kilometer

Philip Götsch (born 20 July 1984) is an Italian male sky runner, who won Skyrunning World Cup in the vertical kilometer in 2016.

== Biography ==
In October 2017, winning the Limone Vertical Extreme, won the European champion title of Vertical Kilometer.
