= Megan Kimmel =

American runner (1980–2026)

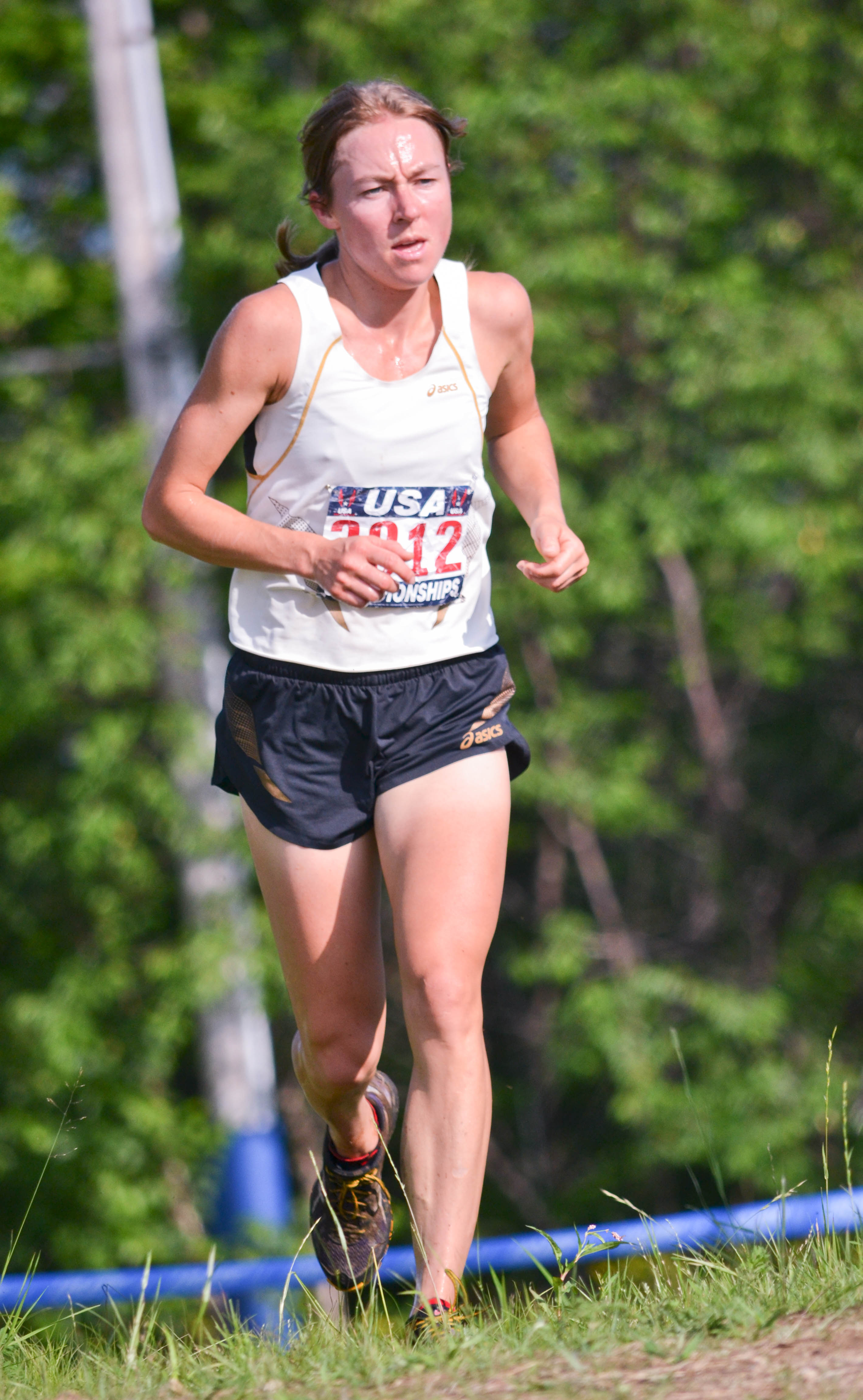
- Kimmel in 2013

Personal information
- Nationality: American
- Born: April 12, 1980 Denver, Colorado, U.S.
- Died: June 10, 2026 (aged 46) Silverton, Colorado, U.S.

Sport
- Country: United States
- Sport: Skyrunning
Medal record
Skyrunning
World Championships
Silver medal – second place	2014 Chamonix	SkyMarathon

Megan Kimmel (April 12, 1980 – June 10, 2026) was an American sky runner and mountain runner who won 2016 Skyrunner World Series in SkyRace.

Kimmel was born on April 12, 1980. She died on June 10, 2026, at the age of 46.

== Achievements ==
Year	Competition	Venue	Position	Event	Time	notes
2014	World Championships	(France) Chamonix	2nd	SkyMarathon (42 km)	3:54:51	
