= Laura Orgué =

Spanish cross country skier and sky runner

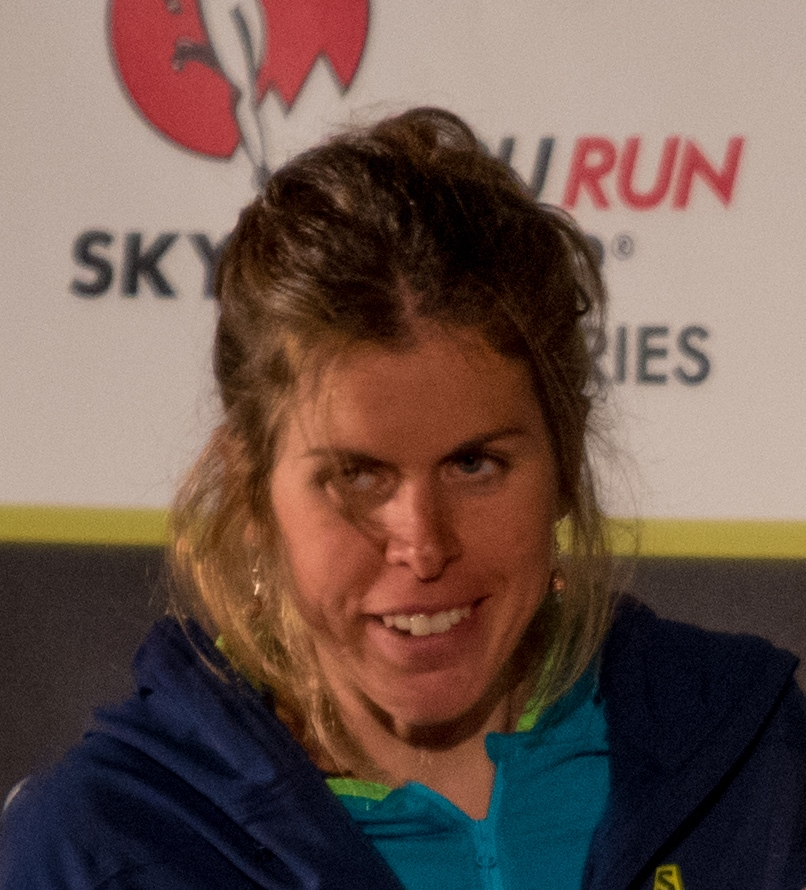
- Laura Orgué in 2017

Personal information
- Full name: Laura Orgué Vila
- Born: September 11, 1986 (age 39) Barcelona, Spain

Sport
- Country: Spain
- Sport: Cross-country skiing Sky running

Achievements and titles
- World finals: 6 Skyrunning World Cup: Vertical Kilometer; 2012; 2013; 2014; 2015; SkyRace; 2015; 2017
Skyrunning
World Championships
Gold medal – first place	2014 Chamonix	Vertical Kilometer
Gold medal – first place	2016 Lleida	Vertical Kilometer
European Championships
Gold medal – first place	2011 Valencia	Vertical Kilometer
Silver medal – second place	2015 Chamonix	Vertical Kilometer

Laura Orgué Vila (born 11 September 1986, in Barcelona, Spain) is a Spanish cross country skier and sky runner who has competed since 2004. Competing in three Winter Olympics, she earned her best finish of 10th in the 30 km skating at Sochi in 2014. In 2014, she switched her focus from skiing to trail running.

== Biography ==
At the FIS Nordic World Ski Championships 2009 in Liberec, Orgue finished 29th in the 30 km, 35th in the 10 km, and did not start the individual sprint event. Same year, in 2009, she reached the bronze medal on 10 km F at the U23 World Championships in Praz de Lys-Sommand. Furthermore, she finished second in the OPA Cup (European league).

Her best World Cup finish was 17th in a 10 km event at Poland in 2014.

== Olympic results ==
Season	Date	Location	Discipline	Place
2006	12 February 2006	Turin, Italy	15km Pursuit	63rd
2006	16 February 2006	Turin, Italy	10km C	63rd
2010	15 February 2010	Vancouver, Canada	10km F	38th
2010	19 February 2010	Vancouver, Canada	15km Pursuit	27th
2010	27 February 2010	Vancouver, Canada	30km C	36th
2014	8 February 2014	Sochi, Russia	15km Skiathlon	25th
2014	13 February 2014	Sochi, Russia	10km C	28th
2014	22 February 2014	Sochi, Russia	30km F	10th

== See also ==
- List of multi-sport athletes - Skyrunning
