= Vertical kilometer =

Mountain running race

Athletics Vertical kilometer
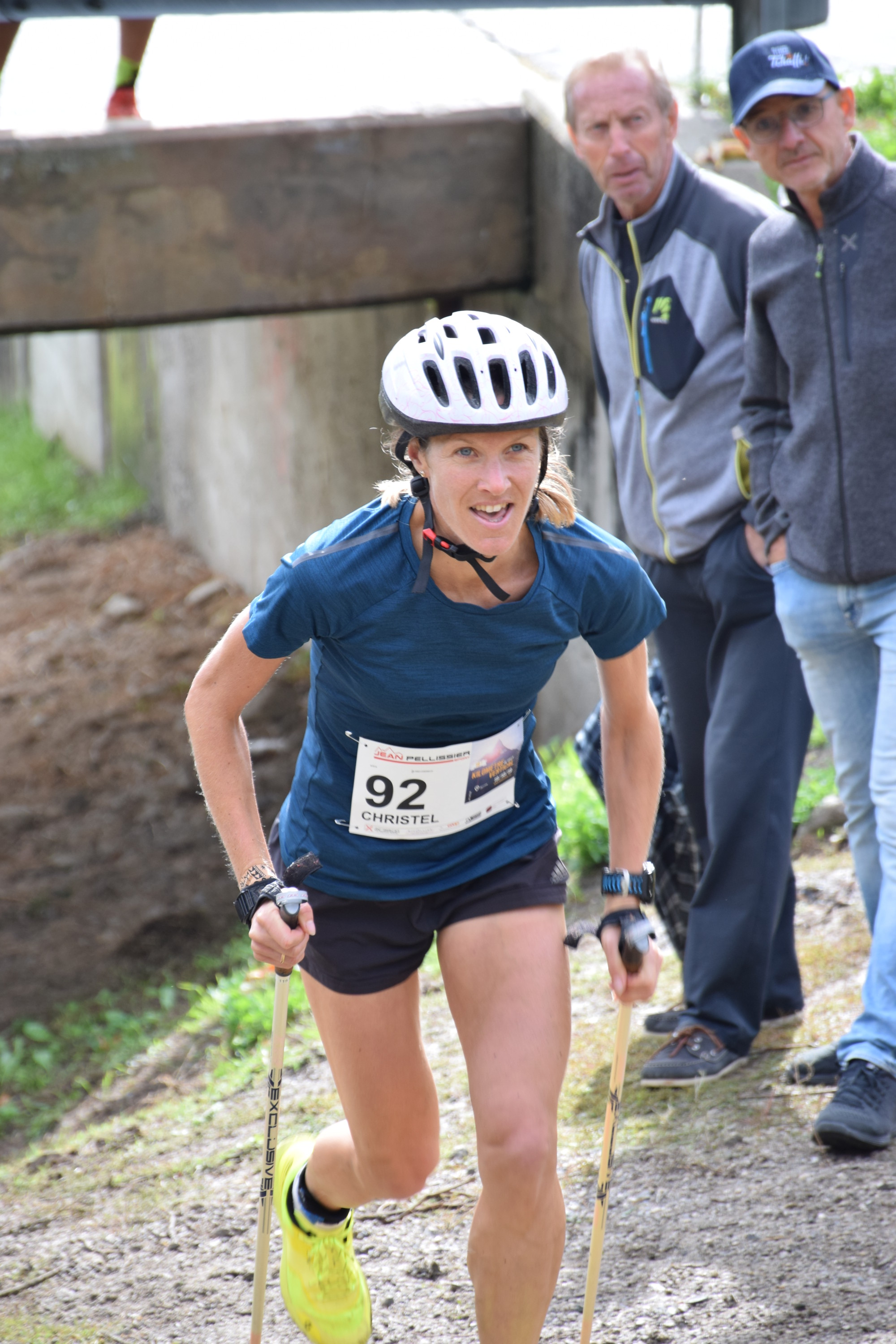
- Christel Dewalle at the 2019 Fully Vertical Kilometer

World records
- Men: (Switzerland) Rémi Bonnet 27:21 (2025)
- Women: (France) Axelle Gachet Mollaret 32:52 (2025)

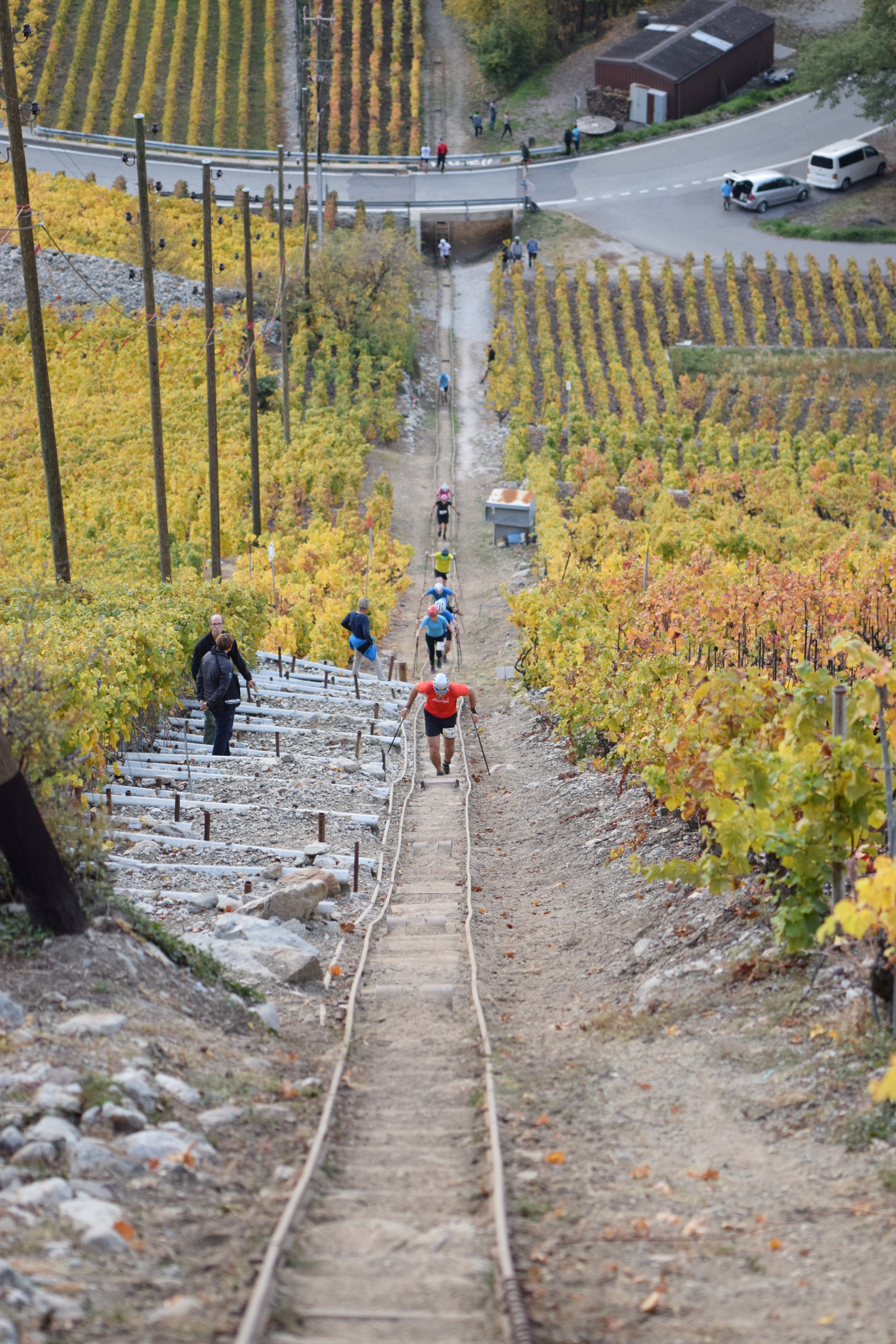
The 2017 Fully Vertical Kilometer

In skyrunning, a vertical kilometer is an uphill mountain running race with an elevation gain of 1,000 metres. The Vertical Kilometer World Circuit also defines it as covering less than 5 km. Trekking poles, which are allowed as optional accessories, are often used in vertical kilometer races.

Related events include the Double Vertical Kilometer and Triple Vertical Kilometer.

== Records ==
The official vertical km record belongs to Rémi Bonnet, who in 2025 won the Kilomètre vertical de Fully with a time of 27:21.

The previous world record was 28:53, set by Philip Götsch in 2017 in Fully.

The women's record belongs to Axelle Mollaret, who in 2025 won the Kilomètre vertical de Fully with a time of 32:52.

The previous women's world record was 33:00, set in September 2025 at Nantau-Montriond, France by French runner Axelle Mollaret.

== Races ==
The Vertical Kilometer World Circuit is an annual international circuit. It was started in 2017 as a spin-off of Skyrunner World Series. The circuit consists of 17 races that are held annually from May to October.

The Kilomètre vertical de Fully (Fully Vertical Kilometer) is one of the best-known vertical kilometer competitions.

Other popular races are the KV Lagunc in Chiavenna and the MelaVertical in Villa di Tirano (SO), Italy.

== See also ==
- Vertical Kilometer World Circuit
- Skyrunning
- Trail running
- Mountain running
