= Skyrunning =

Extreme sport of mountain running above 2,000 metres

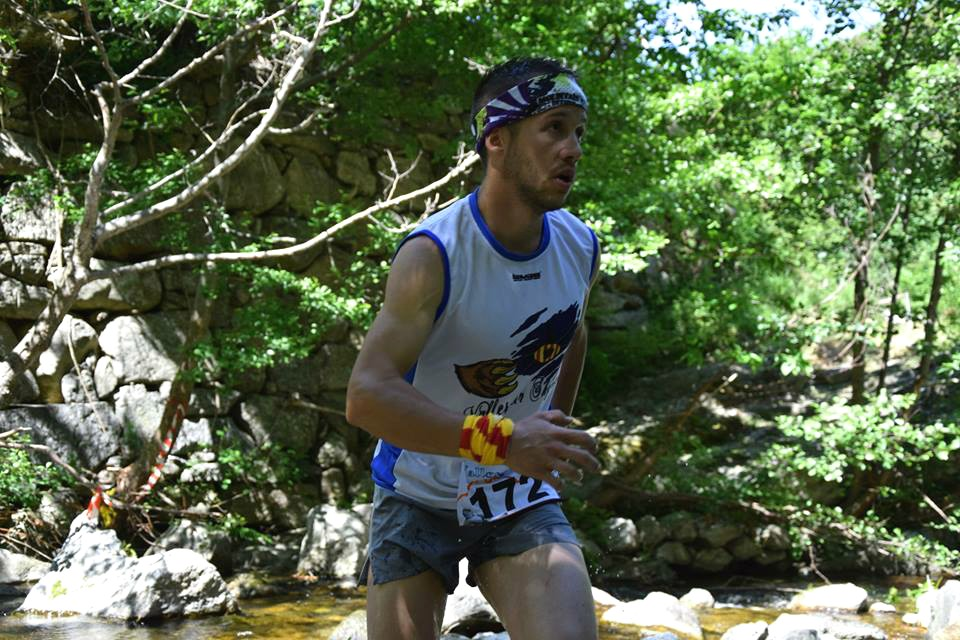
A sky runner.

Skyrunning is a sport of mountain running above 2,000 metres (6,600 ft) where the minimum average incline is 6% over the total distance and at least 5% has an incline of 30% or more. The climbing difficulty does not exceed II grade UIAA. Poles, crampons, and hands may be used to aid progress. The governing body is the International Skyrunning Federation.

The sport comprises a number of different disciplines from the short, steep Vertical Kilometer to the more popular SkyRace and SkyMarathon. Ultra SkyMarathons are becoming increasingly popular as are short vertical SkySpeed races which include skyscraper racing.

== History ==
The idea of skyrunning came from Italian mountaineer Marino Giacometti and a handful of fellow climbers. They pioneered races on Mont Blanc and Monte Rosa in the early 1990s. In 1993, with the support of the Fila sportswear company, skyrunning took off across the world's mountain ranges reaching from the Alps to the Himalayas, to Mount Kenya and the Mexican volcanoes.

In 1995, the Federation for Sport at Altitude (FSA) was founded to address the need for rules to govern the sport and generally manage this fast-growing discipline, which today counts some 200 races worldwide with around 50,000 participants from 65 countries.

The first 10 years of skyrunning history was spent studying the limits of human performance at high altitudes. This was done through the Peak Performance Project, coordinated by Dr. Giulio Sergio Roi, which involved several researchers and has led to the publication of numerous scientific articles.

== International Skyrunning Federation ==
Today, the sport is managed by the International Skyrunning Federation, formed in 2008 by the board and members of the FSA and founding nations. The principal aims of the ISF are the direction, regulation, promotion, development, and furtherance of skyrunning and similar multisport activities on a worldwide basis. ISF sanctions the Skyrunner World Series.

== Skyrunning disciplines ==
The three main disciplines are Sky, SkyUltra, and Vertical. Those are the disciplines contested at the Skyrunning World Championships and Skyrunning Continental Championships. More disciplines are under the ISF regulations:

Discipline	Distance	Vertical climb (minimum)	Extra info
Sky	20–49 km	1,200 m	-
SkyUltra	50–99 km	3,000 m	under 16 hours finishing time
Vertical	max 5 km	1,000 m	minimum average incline must be 20% and 5% of the total distance must be over 33%; double or triple Vertical are also considered
SkySpeed	max 500 m	100 m	minimum of 33% incline
Stair Climbing	-	100 m	races with an incline of over 45% on stairs indoors or outdoors

== Skyrunning competitions ==
- Skyrunning World Championships

Annual world championship.

- Skyrunning European Championships

Annual European championship.

- Skyrunner World Series

Annual world cup, launched in 2004, has grown to represent the peak of outdoor running defined by a vertical climb, altitude, and technical difficulty.

- VK Open Championships

Annual cup to promote the Vertical discipline and highlight the Vertical Kilometer® skyrunning discipline.

== See also ==
- Mountain running
- Mountaineering
- Trail running
- Ultramarathon
