= Skyline Scotland =

Annual skyrunning race events

- Salomon Skyline Scotland logo
- Date: September
- Location: (Scotland): Kinlochleven (2015-2023); Nevis Range, Fort William (2025-)
- Event type: Ultra SkyMarathon; SkyMarathon; SkyRace; Vertical Kilometer
- Distance: 65 km / 4,300 m 52 km / 4,750 m 29 km / 2,500 m 5 km / 1,000 m
- Established: 2015
- Website: Skyline Scotland

Skyline Scotland is a set of annual ultra, trail and mountain running races which take place in the mountains in Lochaber.

The event was originally based at Kinlochleven from 2015 to 2023, where the races were the Mamores VK, the Ring of Steall Skyrace, the Ben Nevis Ultra and the Glen Coe Skyline.

The event is moving in 2025 to be based at the Nevis Range near Fort William, promising 7 completely new race routes in a single day.

The event is sponsored by Salomon.

The courses include some of the most technical terrain found in running races. The Glen Coe Skyline in particular had significant sections of scrambling.

== History ==
The inaugural Glen Coe Skyline took place in 2015.

In 2016 the Mamores VK and Ring of Steall were added, and the Glen Coe Skyline was selected to be the final race in the Skyrunner World Series Extreme.

In 2017 the Ben Nevis Ultra first took place.

In 2018 Skyline Scotland hosted the Skyrunning World Championships. The Mamores VK, the Ben Nevis Ultra and the Ring of Steall were the Championship races. The Glen Coe Skyline, although not part of the World Championships, was one of the races in the 2018 Skyrunner World Series. Starting in 2018, the Ring of Steall has also been one of the races in the Golden Trail World Series.

In 2019, three trail races were added: the Grey Mare's Trail Race (5 km), the Loch Eilde Mór Trail Race (10 km) and the Three Mealls Trail Race (18 km).

In 2020 the event did not take place due to COVID.

2023 was the last time the event took place with Kinlochleven as the main event site. In 2024 there was no Skyline Scotland, and instead organiser Ourea Events hosted the Buttermere Skyline in the Lake District, also sponsored by Salomon. Skyline Scotland is due to return in September 2025 from a new event site at Nevis Range near Fort William.

== List of races (2025-) ==
According to the website, the following races are due to take place in September 2025:

- Aonach Mòr Anarchy (12km, 600m ascent)
- Ben Nevis Skyline (29km, 1800m ascent)
- Steall Marathon (42km, 2200m ascent)
- Jacobite 100 (110km, 2400m ascent)
- Trail races at marathon, half-marathon and 10km distance

== List of races (2015-2023) ==
=== Mamores VK ===
The Mamores VK is a vertical kilometre race in which runners compete on an uphill course with around 1,000 metres of ascent over a distance of approximately 5 kilometres (3.1 mi). The route begins near sea level in Kinlochleven and ends at the top of Na Gruagaichean.

In the inaugural VK race, the runners started at thirty second intervals. The event was won by Alexis Sévennec of France, his time of 42:17 being eight seconds quicker than that of runner-up Stian Angermund-Vik of Norway. The first woman was Georgia Tindley of Great Britain in a time of 54:34.

Angermund-Vik improved on his 2016 result the following year, winning the 2017 edition in a time of 42:04. He was followed by Sam Tosh in second place and Alexis Sévennec in third. The fastest woman was Laura Orgué who finished in a time of 52:22. Second and third places were taken by Beth Hanson and Emelie Forsberg respectively.

The 2018 edition was held in cold and wet weather. Rémi Bonnet set a new course record of 39:23, winning by over two minutes. The second and third positions were taken by Norwegians Thorbjørn Ludvigsen and Stian Angermund-Vik. A new course record was also set in the women's race, with Laura Orgué victorious in a time of 51:35, followed by Lina El Kott Helander in second and Hillary Gerardi in third.

Conditions were warm and sunny for the 2019 race. The winners were both competing in a vertical kilometre for the first time. Zak Hanna was the first man in a time of 44:43, followed by Andrew Barrington and Tom Owens. The woman's race was won by Victoria Wilkinson in 52:49, with Aoife Quigly and Claire Gordon taking second and third positions.

=== Results ===
Year	Men's winner	Women's winner
2016	(France) Alexis Sévennec	(United Kingdom) Georgia Tindley
2017	(Norway) Stian Angermund-Vik	(Spain) Laura Orgué
2018	(Switzerland) Rémi Bonnet	(Spain) Laura Orgué
2019	(Republic of Ireland) Zak Hanna	(United Kingdom) Victoria Wilkinson
2020	Cancelled due to the COVID-19 pandemic	
2021	(United Kingdom) Alastair Thomas	(United Kingdom) Rachel Smith

=== Ben Nevis Ultra ===
The Ben Nevis Ultra is to be distinguished from the annual Ben Nevis Race. In 2017, the Ultra ran from the southern shore of Loch Ness, through glens and over the summit of Ben Nevis before finishing in Kinlochleven. The distance was around 120 kilometres (75 mi) and the route had roughly 4,000 metres (13,000 ft) of ascent. It was won by Donald Campbell in 12:20. The ladies' race was won by Mira Rai in 14:24.

In 2018, the planned route was 52 kilometres (32 mi) in length with 3,820 metres (12,530 ft) of ascent but bad weather conditions meant that the alternative route avoiding some of the higher ground and technical sections was used instead, giving a distance of 47 kilometres (29 mi) with 1,750 metres (5,740 ft) of climbing. Jonathan Albon and Ragna Debats took the wins with clear margins of victory, their times being 3:48:02 and 4:36:20 respectively.

Good weather in 2019 allowed the 52 km course to be used, with runners traversing the Càrn Mòr Dearg Arête to Ben Nevis before joining the Ring of Steall route later in the race. Murray Strain was the first to finish in a time of 7:51:31. The women's winner was Katie Kaars Sijpesteijn whose time of 8:05:28 gave her third position overall in the race.

==== Results ====
Sky Ultra of Skyrunner World Series

Year	Men's winner	Women's winner
2017	(United Kingdom) Donald Campbell	(Nepal) Mira Rai
2018	(United Kingdom) Jonathan Albon	(Netherlands) Ragna Debats
2019	(United Kingdom) Murrary Strain	(United Kingdom) Katie Kaars Sijpesteijn
2020	Cancelled due to the COVID-19 pandemic	
2021	(United Kingdom) Alan Hilley	(Wales) Anwen Darlington
2022	(United Kingdom) Jack Oates	(United Kingdom) Lynne Allen
2023	(New Zealand) David Haunschmidt	(United Kingdom) Alicia Schwarzenbach

==== Ring of Steall Skyrace ====
The Ring of Steall Skyrace course is based on the Ring of Steall ridge-walking route in the Mamores. The race starts and finishes in Kinlochleven and visits checkpoints including Sgùrr a' Mhàim, Steall Waterfall, An Gearanach, Stob Coire a' Chàirn and Am Bodach. The distance is approximately 29 kilometres (18 mi) and the route has around 2,500 metres (8,200 ft) of ascent. Much of the ground is very rough.

A landslide in the area a few days before the 2016 race meant that a section of the course had to be rerouted.

The leading competitors in the previous day's VK race were also prominent in the 2016 Ring of Steall. The Skyrace was won by Stian Angermund-Vik in 3:25:28, followed by Alexis Sévennec in second place around four minutes behind. The first lady to finish was Georgia Tindley in a time of 4:39:20.

The 2017 race was also won Angermund-Vik, his time being 3:24. The next two places were taken by Pascal Egli and Kris Jones. Laura Orgué won the ladies' race in 4:05, closely followed by Sheila Avilés, with Oihana Azkorbebeitia in third.

New course records for both men and women were set in 2018. Kilian Jornet won in a time of 3:04:34 after a close race with runner-up Nadir Maguet. Stian Angermund-Vik took third place. Among the women, Tove Alexandersson led for the majority of the race, taking the victory in 3:46:28. Victoria Wilkinson finished in second place, with Holly Page taking the bronze medal.

Nadir Maguet moved up to the top position in 2019, his winning time being 3:14:47. He was followed by Marc Lauenstein and Max King in 3:19 and 3:20 respectively. In the women's race, Judith Wyder set a new course record by nearly ten minutes with a time of 3:36:46. The next two positions were taken by Holly Page in 3:54 and Fanny Borgström in 4:02.

==== Results ====
Sky Classic of Skyrunner World Series

Year	Men's winner	Women's winner
2016	(Norway) Stian Angermund-Vik	(United Kingdom) Georgia Tindley
2017	(Norway) Stian Angermund-Vik	(Spain) Laura Orgué
2018	(Spain) Kilian Jornet Burgada	(Sweden) Tove Alexandersson
2019	(Italy) Nadir Maguet	(Switzerland) Judith Wyder
2020	Cancelled due to the COVID-19 pandemic	
2021	(United Kingdom) Sebastian Batchelor	(United Kingdom) Eleanor Davis
2022	(United Kingdom) Alan Cherry	(United Kingdom) Naomi Lang
2023	(United Kingdom) Gavin Dale	(United Kingdom) Sara Willhoit

=== Glen Coe Skyline ===
The Glen Coe Skyline route takes in the technical Curved Ridge on Buachaille Etive Mòr, then heads west over Stob Coire Sgreamhach before an out-and-back section to Stob Coire nan Lochan. It then drops down to the valley near Loch Achtriochtan before climbing steeply up to the Aonach Eagach, a rocky ridge which is traversed from west to east before the route joins the West Highland Way to the finish. In 2015, the Skyline started and finished at Glencoe Mountain Resort but for the following year, the start and finish was moved to Kinlochleven and the runners reached Curved Ridge via the West Highland Way and a descent of the Devil's Staircase. The race is around 55 kilometres (34 mi) in length with 4,750 metres (15,580 ft) of ascent.

The 2015 race was won by Joe Symonds in 7:36:21, with the first woman Emelie Forsberg finishing second overall in 7:44:19.

In 2016, four runners featured prominently at the front of the race for much of the way: Tom Owens, Jonathan Albon, Marc Lauenstein and Finlay Wild. Albon and Owens lost a few minutes in low cloud locating the checkpoint on Stob Coire Sgreamhach but were still leading together with Lauenstein at the start of the long climb up to the Aonach Eagach. By the top of the climb, Albon had pulled ahead and he held the lead on the crossing of the exposed ridge and the descent to the finish, winning in a time of 6:33:52. Owens finished second around three minutes later. Jasmin Paris won the women's race in a time of 8:15:56.

The 2017 edition was won by Kilian Jornet in a course record of 6:25:39, with Jonathan Albon second in 6:31 and Alexis Sévennec third in 6:40. The first woman was Emelie Forsberg in 7:53:30. Megan Kimmel was second in 8:14, with Ragna Debats third in 8:22.

Windy and wet conditions for the 2018 event resulted in a bad weather course being used. This was 32 kilometres (20 mi) in length with around 2,700 metres (8,900 ft) of ascent. Kilian Jornet was the men's winner in 3:37, after having won the Ring of Steall race the previous day. There was a close finish in the women's Glen Coe Skyline, with Hillary Gerardi winning in 4:17:48, seven seconds ahead of Jasmin Paris.

The men's race was close in the 2019 edition, with Erik Johannes Husom taking the victory in 7:55, followed by Andy Berry in 7:58 and Greg Vollet in 8:03. Georgia Tindley was a clear winner in the women's race in 8:29. Second and third places were taken by Ann Penelope Spencer in 9:10 and Megan Wilson in 9:20.

==== Results ====
Sky Ultra of Skyrunner World Series
Sky Extreme of Skyrunner World Series

Year	Men's winner	Women's winner
2015	(United Kingdom) Joe Symonds	(Sweden) Emelie Forsberg
2016	(United Kingdom) Jonathan Albon	(United Kingdom) Jasmin Paris
2017	(Spain) Kilian Jornet Burgada	(Sweden) Emelie Forsberg
2018	(Spain) Kilian Jornet Burgada	(United States) Hillary Gerardi
2019	(Norway) Erik Johannes Husom	(United Kingdom) Georgia Tindley
2020	Cancelled due to the COVID-19 pandemic	
2021	(United Kingdom) Andrew Fallas	(United Kingdom) Georgia Tindley
2022	(United Kingdom) Andrew Lamont	(Switzerland) Noëmi Löw
2023	(United Kingdom) Philip Rutter	(United Kingdom) Naomi Lang
