= Na Gruagaichean =

Mountain in Scotland

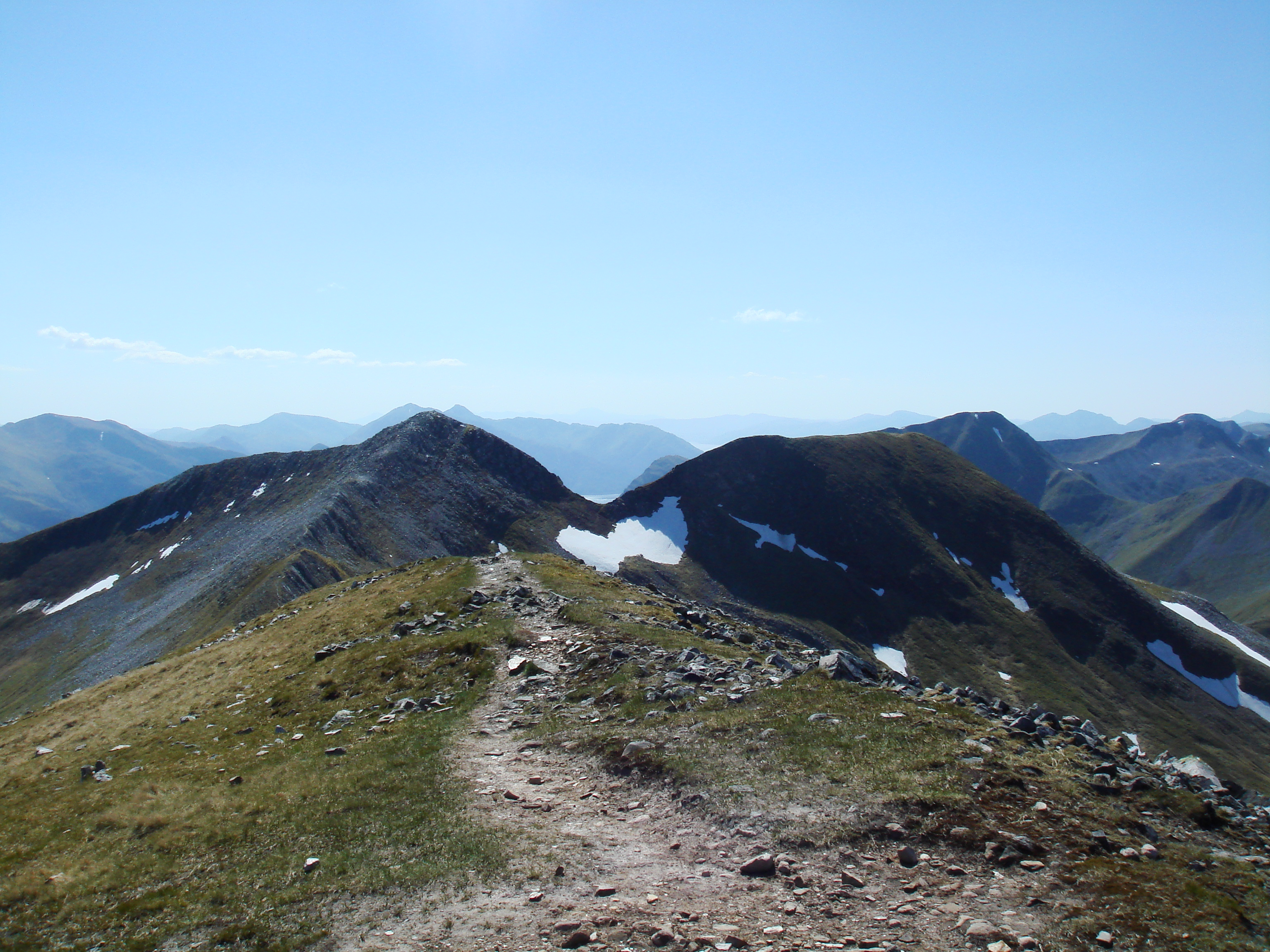
- Looking towards Na Gruagaichean, 1 km to the east.

Highest point
- Elevation: 1,056 m (3,465 ft)
- Prominence: 98 m (322 ft)
- Parent peak: Binnein Mòr
- Listing: Munro
- Coordinates: 56.7437°N 4.9399°W

Naming
- English translation: The Maidens
- Language of name: Gaelic

Geography
- Location within Scotland
- Location: Highland, Scotland
- Parent range: Mamores
- OS grid: NN20316519
- Topo map: OS Landranger 41

Na Gruagaichean (Scottish Gaelic for 'the maidens') is one of the Mamores mountains in the Scottish Highlands, between Glen Nevis to the north and the village of Kinlochleven to the south. It has twin peaks, the highest of which rises to 1,056 m (3,465 ft), and it is classed as a Munro. The mountain is one of the most accessible from the village, due in part to its nearness and a well-defined path leading most of the way to the summit.

== Landscape ==
The mountain lies four kilometres north north-east of the village of Kinlochleven. The mountain is double topped at the intersection of three ridges, the South top being the higher and therefore the summit. The narrow North-East ridge connects to Binnein Mòr via a minor top (1062 m) and the narrow West-North-West ridge connects to Stob Coire a' Chàirn (981 m) where a path ascends from Coire na Bà. The third South ridge leads to steep slopes overlooking Kinlochleven which provides excellent views of the village and the area. The mountain has a stony and, in places, craggy summit which gives great views of surrounding mountains such as Ben Nevis and Binnein Mòr.

== Climbing ==
Ascent up towards Na Gruagaichean usually starts at sea level in Kinlochleven. From there it is usually climbed using the old stalkers path heading north away from the village before eventually turning east towards the summit. The mountain can also be climbed from Glen Nevis together with Binnein Beag and Binnein Mòr as a ridge walk or a part as the challenging Ring of Steall ridge walk.

The Mamores VK race, which starts in Kinlochleven, finishes at the top of Na Gruagaichean.

On Saturday 8 June 2019, a group of seven walkers were on Na Gruagaichean during a lightning storm. One was killed and another injured. HM Coastguard helicopter, Glencoe Mountain Rescue Team and Scotland's Air Ambulance service all aided the rescue effort.

== Folktale ==
The following is a folktale in Gaelic and English about Na Gruagaichean or The Maidens.

Bha uair-eigin a’ fuireachd an Callairt duin’-uasal a bha ’na shealgair fhiadh ro ainmeil…

There once lived in Callart a gentleman who was a very famous deer hunter. He had a greyhound the equal of which was not then to be found in Lochaber; but, like his master, he was growing old and losing his speed. One day in Autumn the gentleman, followed by his old greyhound, ascended the hill above Kinloch More to chase the deer. He reached the corries he used to frequent; but though he saw herd after herd of them and followed them all day long, he never got near enough to shoot an arrow or to slip the dog after them. At length, when the sun was slipping down in the west, he came upon a fine-full grown stag all by himself, and he slipped the dog in pursuit of him. The dog stretched away with all his might, and at first was gaining on the stag, but as soon as the stag laid his antlers down over his shoulders, and lifted his nostrils in the air, the dog began to fall behind, and soon lost sight of him altogether. Wearied and vexed, the gentleman sat down on a green hillock in a deep glen between two lofty mountains. He was not long there when two maidens of fairest form and mien stood before him, one of them holding a noble dog on a leash. The other was the first to speak, and she said: "You are tired, hunter of the deer," said she, "and vexed because the old dog has allowed the big stag to escape."

"I am tired, indeed, and grieved, that the grey dog’s best days have passed," answered the hunter.

"Courage, and take this dog with you," said the second maiden, "and there is not a four-hoofed creature on the face of the earth, from the little hare to the full-antlered stag, but he will catch, and bring to you."

"What is his name?" asked the hunter.

She replied that it was Brodum. He took the leash out of her hand, and thanked her for the dog. He then bade farewell to herself and her companion, and went away home.

As soon as he rose the next day, he brought everyone in the house out with him, and after turning his face towards the two mountains between which he had seen the maidens, he said: "Do you see yonder two mountains opposite you? From henceforth, remember that you are to call them the Maidens," and that is what they are called to the present day.

The dog followed the gentleman as long as he lived, Never was a leather strap placed on a better dog. Whatever he was asked to do he did, and no creature he was sent after but he caught. And there was no man living he would follow, or answer, save his master.

When his master died he lost heart. He followed the funeral as far as the ravine between Callart and the next farm; but he stopped there and descended the ravine where he was seen entering a cave, out of which he never returned. His name is preserved in the names of these two places; for they are still called Brodum’s Ravine and Brodum’s Cave.
