= Stob Bàn (Mamores) =

Mountain in Scotland

Coordinates: 56.74330°N 5.03157°W

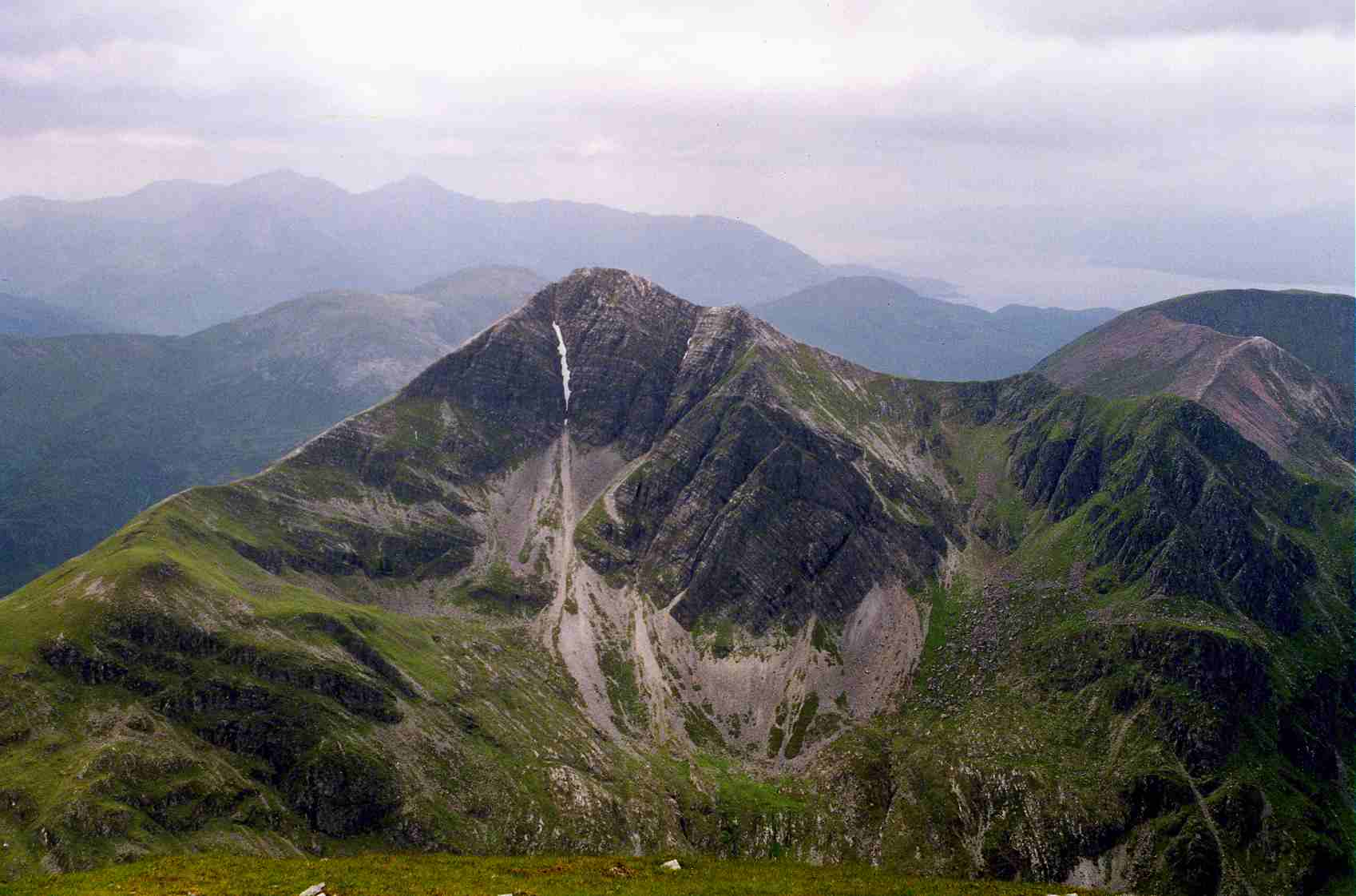
- Stob Bàn and its north eastern face seen from Sgurr a' Mhàim 2.5 km to the NE.

Highest point
- Elevation: 999 m (3,278 ft)
- Prominence: c. 234 m
- Parent peak: Sgurr a' Mhàim
- Listing: Munro, Marilyn

Naming
- English translation: White Peak
- Language of name: Gaelic
- Pronunciation: Scottish Gaelic: [ˈs̪t̪op ˈpaːn] English approximation: stop-BAHN

Geography
- Location: Highland, Scotland
- Parent range: Mamores
- OS grid: NN147654
- Topo map: OS Landranger 41, OS Explorer 392

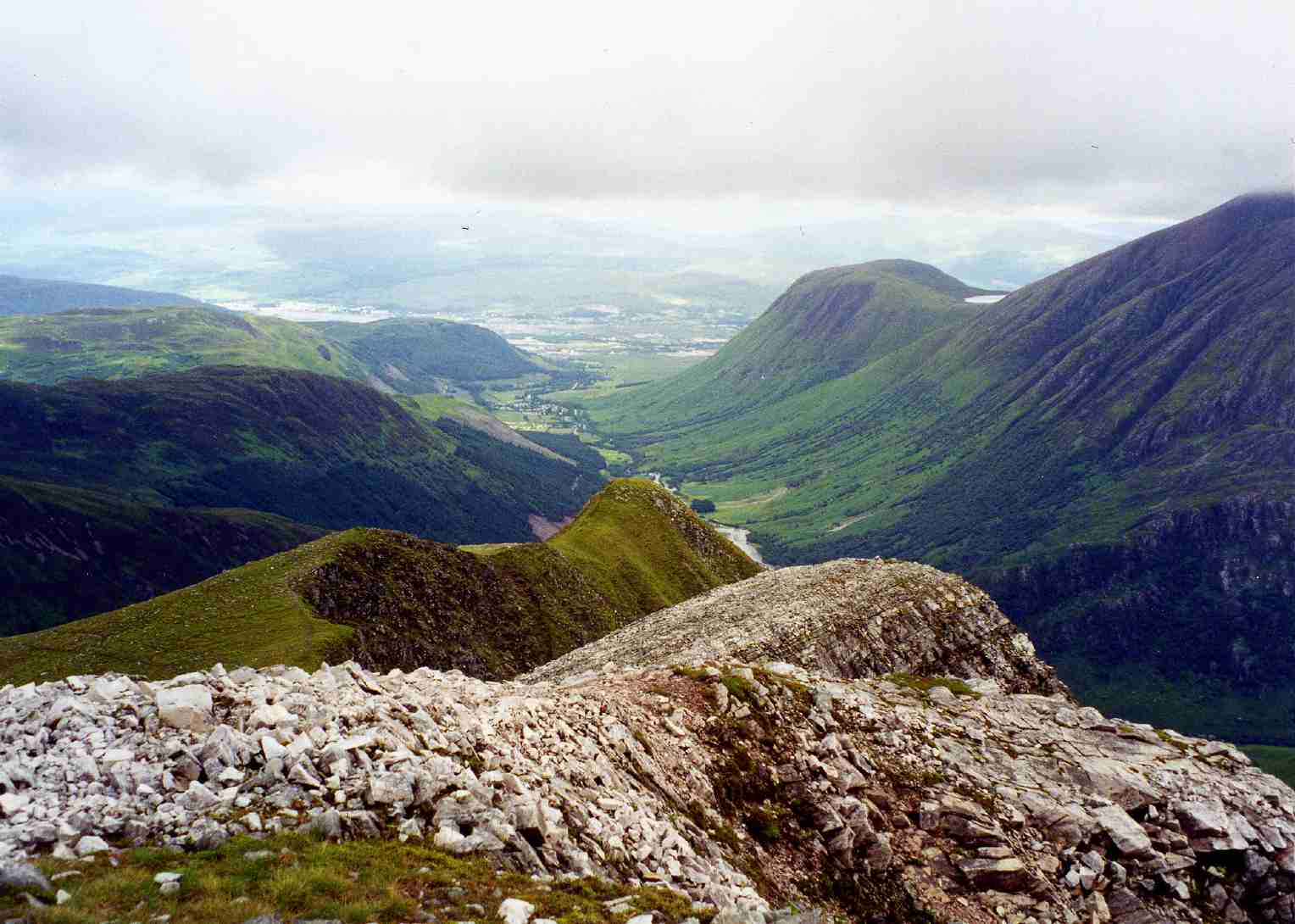
Looking down Stob Bàn's undulating northern ridge to Glen Nevis .

Stob Bàn is a Scottish mountain situated at the western end of the Mamores ridge, five and a half kilometres north-west of Kinlochleven. With a height of 999 metres (3,278 feet) it qualifies as a Munro. Stob Bàn is a distinctive sight when viewed from lower Glen Nevis with its sharp peak and capping of white quartzite rocks which are often mistaken for snow; its Gaelic name translates as White Peak or Light Coloured Peak.

Stob Bàn exhibits striking examples of Dalradian rock geology and has been identified by the Joint Nature Conservation Committee (JNCC) as an important site in its Geological Conservation Review. Dalradian rocks were characteristically formed in the high ground to the east and south of the Great Glen of Scotland. Dalriada was the name for this ancient Celtic region. The mountain should not confused with another Stob Bàn, also a Munro which is located in the Grey Corries above Spean Bridge.

Stob Bàn has three main ridges: the east ridge connects to the former Munro of Sgor an Iubhair via the top of the Coire a' Mhusgain (Corrie of the Shellfish), the western ridge links to the adjoining Munro of Mullach nan Coirean while the northern ridge drops steeply to Glen Nevis over a series of terraced rocky outcrops. There is a less significant fourth ridge which gives a steep descent south west to the West Highland Way en route from Kinlochleven to Fort William and is quick way off the mountain for walkers who have approached from the south. Stob Bàn can be climbed as part of the Highland High Way, a high level alternative of the West Highland Way, walkers often do the final day between Kinlochleven and Fort William over some of the Mamores peaks if the weather is fine.

Stob Bàn's most striking physical characteristic are its crags on the north eastern face; these fall precipitously to Coire a' Mhusgain over 400 metres below and contribute greatly to the mountain's classic pyramidal shape. The buttresses on the northern ridge of the mountain attract winter ice climbers. South Buttress has several good winter gully climbs, Central Buttress features three gully lines, a rocky rib and an arete all giving good winter climbs on broken rock.

Stob Bàn is usually climbed from Glen Nevis to the north; direct ascents start at Achriabhach and take the stalkers path which ascends Coire a' Mhusgain to reach the col between Stob Bàn and Sgor an Iubhair before climbing steeply up the eastern ridge to the summit. From the same starting point it is also possible to ascend the rough and undulating north ridge; on this route there is a significant false top at a height of 900 metres which is often mistaken for the summit. Stob Bàn is also quite often climbed in conjunction with the neighbouring Munro of Mullach nan Coirean which lies three kilometres to the west. The view from the summit takes in fine views of Ben Nevis and the Aonachs.
