= Sgùrr Eilde Mòr =

Mountain in Scotland

Coordinates: 56.749863°N 4.89424°W

Sgurr Eilde Mor
- Sgùrr Èilde Mhòr
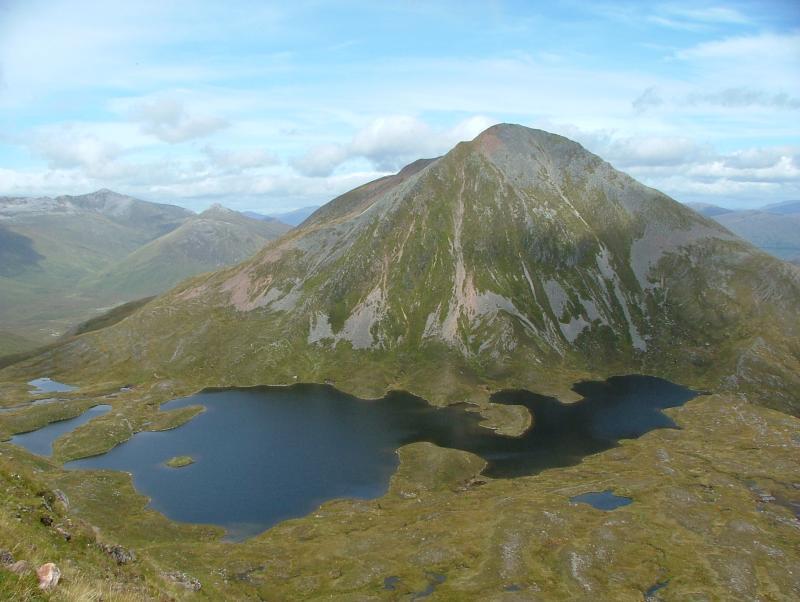
- Sgùrr Eilde Mòr and Coire an Lochan from Sgòr Eilde Beag

Highest point
- Elevation: 1,010 m (3,310 ft)
- Prominence: 271 m (889 ft)
- Parent peak: Binnein Mòr
- Listing: Munro, Marilyn

Naming
- English translation: big peak of the hind
- Language of name: Gaelic
- Pronunciation: Scottish Gaelic: [ˈs̪kuːrˠ ˈeːltʲə moːɾ] English approximation: skoor-AYLT-yə-mor

Geography
- Location: Highland, Scotland
- Parent range: Mamores
- OS grid: NN230657
- Topo map: OS Landranger 41, OS Explorer 392

Sgùrr Eilde Mòr or Sgùrr Èilde Mhòr (in Gaelic) is a mountain in the Mamores range of the Grampian Mountains, Scotland. It is 6 kilometres north-east of Kinlochleven. It is a steep, conical peak of scree and quartzite boulders, capped with a layer of schist. With a height of 1010 m (3314 ft) it is classed as a Munro, so is popular with hillwalkers. It is most commonly climbed from Kinlochleven by way of a stalker's path which leads to a col at Coire an Lochan, and then by either the south or the west ridge - both routes involving an ascent of steep, bouldery terrain.
