= An Gearanach =

Mountain in Scotland

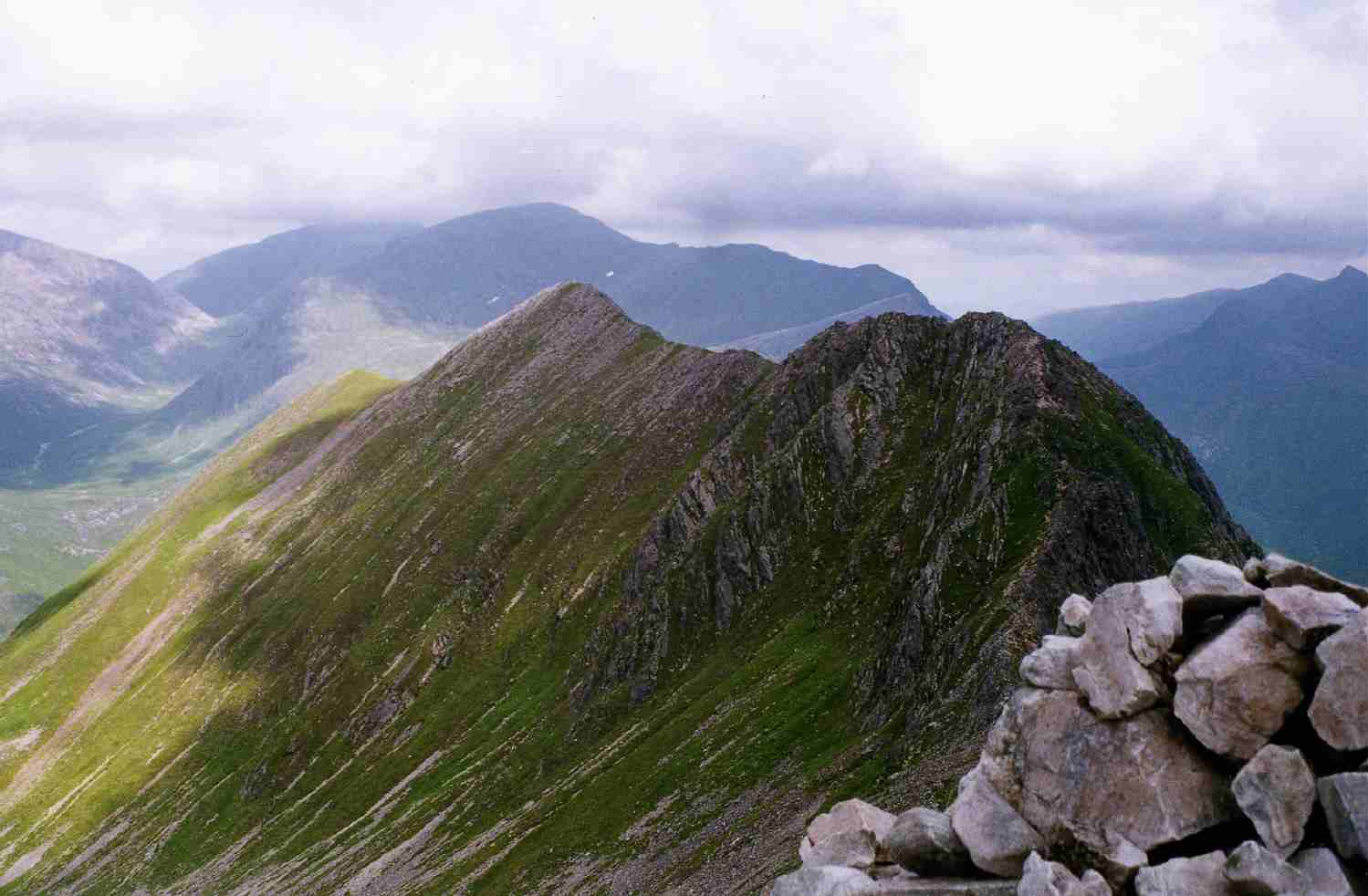
- An Gearanach (left) and An Garbhanach (right) from Stob Coire a' Chàirn

Highest point
- Elevation: 982 m (3,222 ft)
- Prominence: 151 m (495 ft)
- Parent peak: Am Bodach
- Listing: Munro, Marilyn
- Coordinates: 56°45′30″N 4°58′02″W

Naming
- English translation: short ridge or the complainer
- Language of name: Gaelic
- Pronunciation: Scottish Gaelic: [əŋʲˈkʲɛɾanəx] English approximation: ənk-YERR-ə-nəkh

Geography
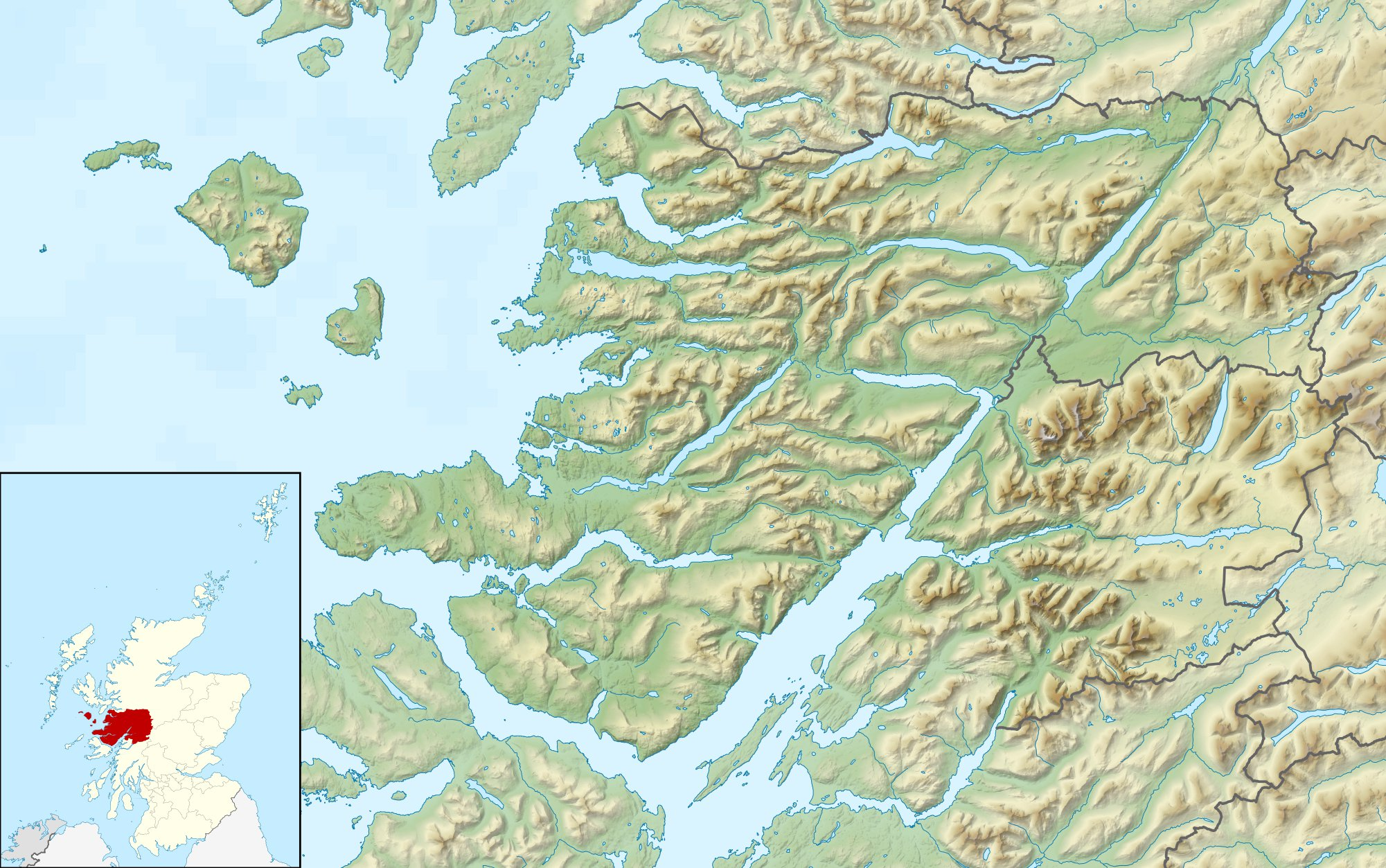
- Location within Lochaber
- Location: Highland, Scotland
- Parent range: Mamores
- OS grid: NN187669
- Topo map: OS Landranger 41, OS Explorer 392

Listed summits of An Gearanach
Name	Grid ref	Height	Status
An Garbhanach	NN188665	975 m (3,199 ft)	Munro Top

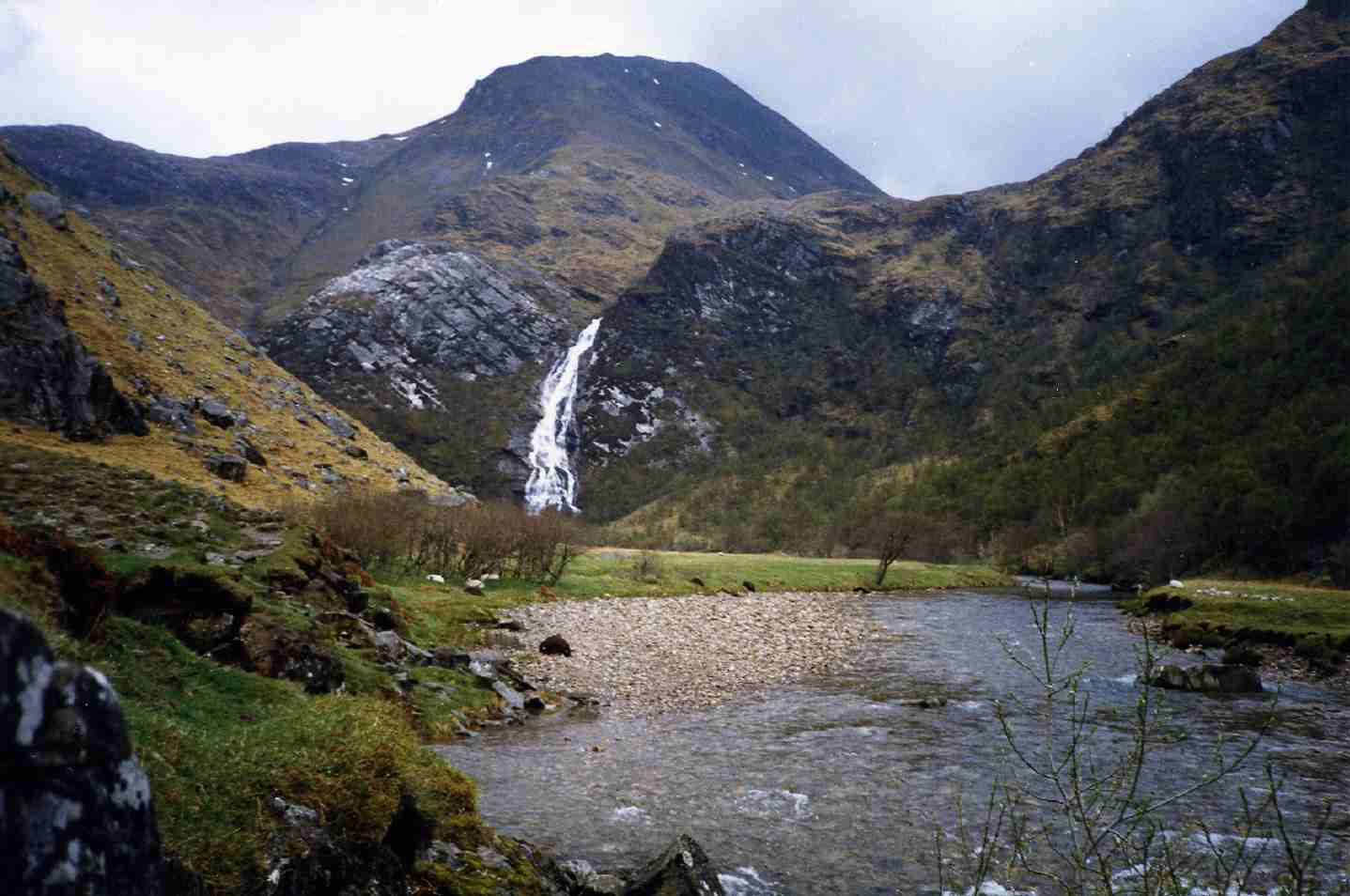
The waterfall of An Steall Bàn flows into Glen Nevis on An Gearanach's lower northern slopes.

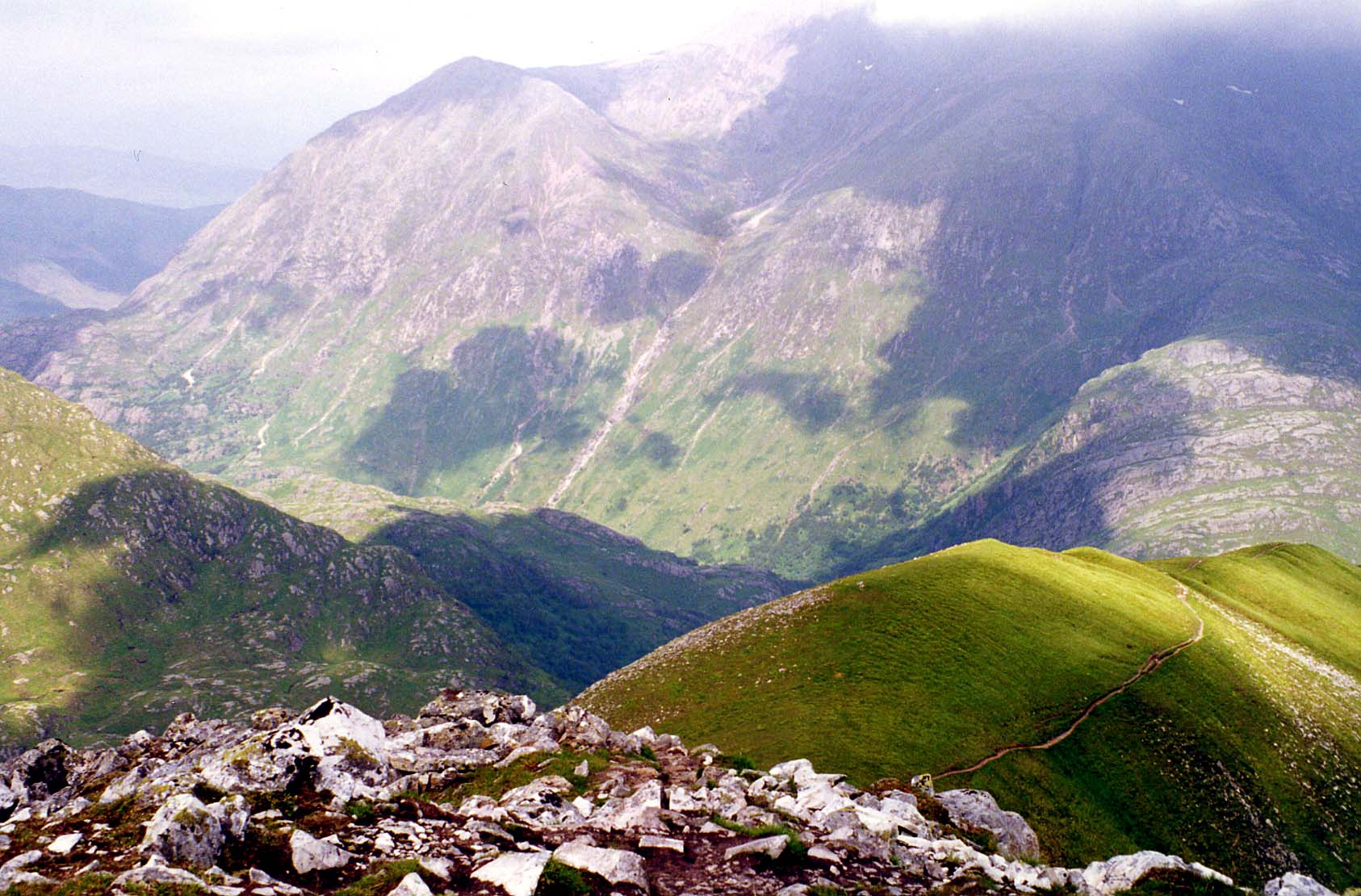
Glen Nevis from the summit of An Gearanach

An Gearanach is a Scottish mountain situated in the Mamore Forest, five and a half kilometres north of Kinlochleven in the Lochaber region of the Highland council area.

== Overview ==
An Gearanach reaches a height of 982 metres (3222 feet) making it Munro number 167 in height order and with a prominence of 151 metres it just qualifies as a Marilyn. It is part of a group of mountains commonly called the Mamores which lie between Loch Leven and Glen Nevis and consist of 10 Munros and two Corbetts. The translation of the mountains name from Gaelic is uncertain with some publications giving it as "short ridge" from "Geàrr Aonach" while others give a translated name of "the complainer" or "the sad place".

== Geography ==
The upper slopes of An Gearanach are basically a north-south summit ridge just over a kilometre in length with steep flanks which drop into the valleys of the Allt Coire a' Mhail to the west and the Allt Coire na Gabhalach to the east. At the northern end of the mountain are three ridges which go roughly NW, north and NE descending to upper Glen Nevis. To the south is a ridge which descends to the Bealach a' Chadah (857 metres) before continuing to the adjoining Munro of Stob Coire a' Chàirn. An Gearanach is a popular mountain, not just because of its Munro status but because it is part of one of the best and most exposed ridge walks in the whole of Scotland, the Ring of Steall. This route takes in the three other Munros of Stob Coire a' Chàirn, Am Bodach and Sgurr a' Mhàim during a circuit of the Allt Coire a' Mhàil, a glen which feeds the An Steall Ban waterfall. The An Steall Bàn ("the white spout") is a fine sight as it drops 120 metres down the northern lower slopes of An Gearanach. The base of the falls is passed on the approach to the mountain from Glen Nevis.

An Gearanach has a subsidiary peak, An Garbhanach ("rough ridge"), which lies 400 metres to the south: the two are connected by a narrow ridge which at one point is quite tricky as it tapers to a knife edge arête dropping into deep glens on either side and requires a good head for heights. There has always been some uncertainty about which is the highest point, with both An Gearanach and An Garbhanach given a height of 3,200 feet on pre metric maps in the 1970s. An Garbhanach reaches a height of 975 metres and in 1921 was accidentally elevated to Munro status and An Gearanach reduced to a "top" due to the vagaries of old fashioned mapping techniques. The mistake was rectified in the 1933 revision of Munro's tables with an explanation that it had all been a mistake. The northern slopes of An Gearanach require some care when descending from the mountain to Glen Nevis and there have been fatalities as walkers have left the stalkers path and tried to descend directly to Glen Nevis and got into difficulties on the crags above the An Steall Ban waterfall.

== Ascents ==
An Gearanach can be climbed from either Glen Nevis or Kinlochleven. The approach from Glen Nevis is shorter and has the advantage of approaching through the lovely Nevis gorge and past the foot of the An Steall Ban waterfall. After crossing the Water of Nevis on a wire suspension bridge and passing the foot of the waterfall, a stalkers path zig zags up the hillside to gain the NNE ridge and up to the summit. The approach from Kinlochleven involves firstly ascending Stob Coire a' Chàirn by the stalkers' path up Coire na Ba before continuing to An Gearanach giving an out and back trip of 14 kilometres.
