= Am Bodach =

Mountain in Scotland

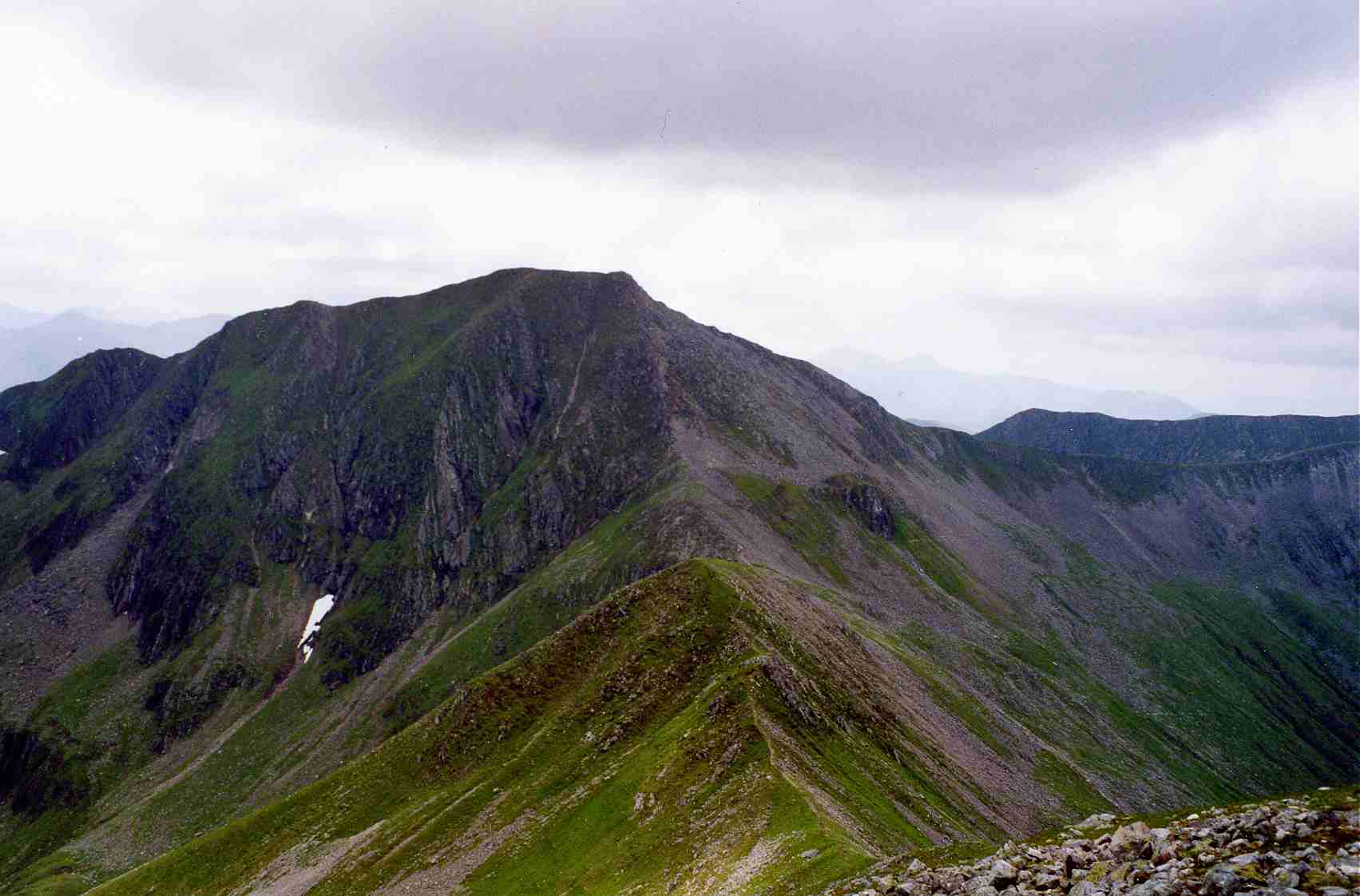
- Am Bodach seen from Stob Coire a' Chàirn, 1.5 km to the NE.

Highest point
- Elevation: 1,032 m (3,386 ft)
- Prominence: 151 m (495 ft)
- Parent peak: Sgurr a' Mhàim
- Listing: Munro, Marilyn
- Coordinates: 56°44′27″N 4°59′02″W

Naming
- English translation: The Old Man
- Language of name: Gaelic
- Pronunciation: Scottish Gaelic: [əmˈpɔt̪əx] English approximation: əm-BOT-əkh

Geography
- Location within Highland
- Location: Highland, Scotland
- Parent range: Mamores
- OS grid: NN176650
- Topo map: OS Landranger 41, OS Explorer 392

Am Bodach is a Scottish mountain which lies in the Mamores range, four kilometres north of Kinlochleven in the Highland council area.

== Overview ==
Am Bodach is a Munro which reaches a height of 1032 metres (3386 feet) making it the 100th highest mountain in that classification, it is situated on the main ridge of the Mamores in a central position and is the most accessible of the group. The closest approach to the mountain is from Kinlochleven to the south, however the mountain is often approached along its north eastern or eastern ridges as part of the highly rated “Ring of Steall” ridge walk which starts and finishes in Glen Nevis and climbs the other Munros of An Gearanach, Stob Coire a' Chàirn and Sgurr a' Mhàim. Am Bodach translates from the Gaelic as “The Old Man”, this name was often given to a conspicuous hill overlooking a community and it was probably named by settlers at the head of Loch Leven which the mountain overlooks. The mountain should not be confused with another Am Bodach at the eastern end of the Aonach Eagach ridge in Glen Coe.

== Geography ==
Am Bodach is a fine looking mountain with a sharp peak formed by its three steep and rocky faces, the eastern face above the Coire na Ba is especially precipitous and craggy and holds patches of snow well into summer. Am Bodach has three ridges radiating from its summit, the western one connects to the former Munro of Sgurr an Iubhair (downgraded to a "Top" in the 1997 revisions) while the north eastern ridge, which is steep and rocky, connects to the Munro of Stob Coire a' Chàirn, it is along these two ridges that walkers undertaking the Ring of Steall walk will arrive and leave the mountain. A third ridge goes southerly over the minor top of Sgurr an Fhurain before descending steeply to Kinlochleven.

== Ascents ==
The ascent of Am Bodach starts at sea level at Kinlochleven; various routes, including the path initially followed by the West Highland Way from the western end of the village, can be followed to reach the old military road to Fort William built by General Caulfield, which the West Highland Way then follows; all routes from the south involve initially reaching this track. The easiest route is to leave the track 500 metres further west of where the West Highland Way joins it and follow a stalker's path up Coire na h-Eirghe to the main Mamores ridge, turning east along the ridge to ascend to the summit; the most direct approach via Sgùrr an Fhuarain is very steep in places. It can also be approached via a stalker's path up Coire na Bà which reaches the main Mamores ridge east of Stob Coire a' Chàirn; this summit is then traversed, joining the Ring of Steall, before continuing south westwards to reach the north east ridge of Am Bodach. The view from the summit takes in Ben Nevis to the north and Loch Leven and the mountains surrounding Glen Coe to the south, with Bidean nam Bian looking especially fine.
