= Mullach nan Coirean =

Mountain in Scotland

- Sgùrr a' Chaorainn
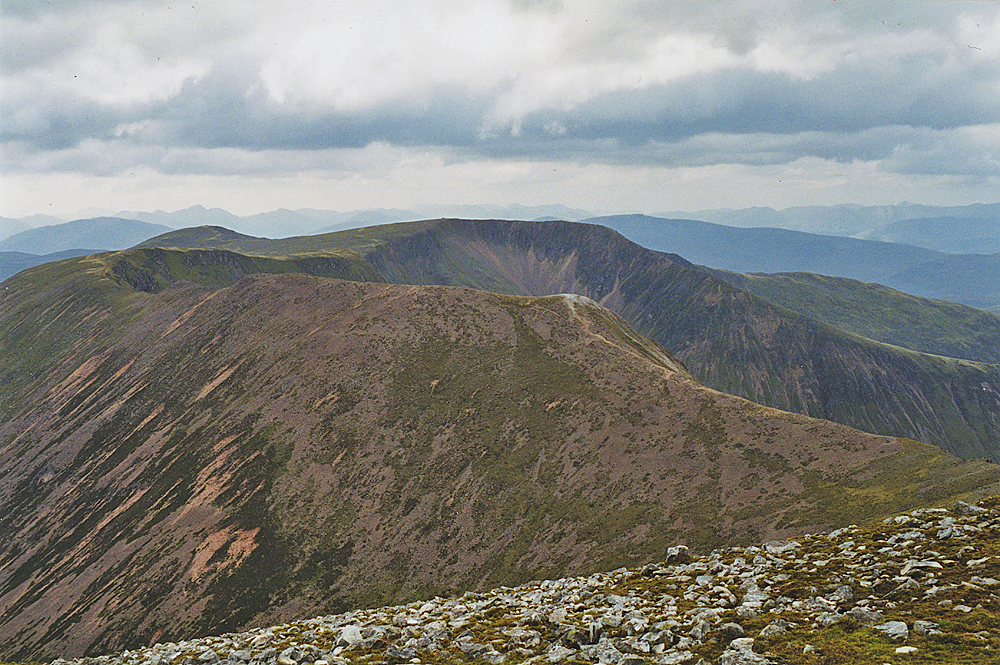
- Mullach nan Coirean seen from Stob Bàn

Highest point
- Elevation: 939 m (3,081 ft)
- Prominence: 93 m (305 ft)
- Parent peak: Stob Bàn
- Listing: Munro
- Coordinates: 56.749867°N 5.072397°W

Naming
- Language of name: Scottish Gaelic
- Pronunciation: Scottish Gaelic: [ˈmul̪ˠəx nəŋ ˈkʰɔɾʲən] English approximation: MOO-ləkh-nən-KOR-yən

Geography
- Location: Highland, Scotland
- Parent range: Mamores
- OS grid: NN122662
- Topo map: OS Landranger 41, OS Explorers 392

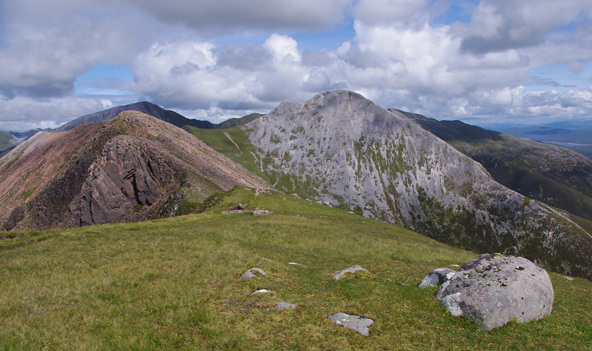
Mullach nan Coirean (left) and Stob Ban

Mullach nan Coirean (Scottish Gaelic for 'summit of the corries') or Sgùrr a' Chaorainn ('peak of the rowan') is one of the Mamores mountains in the Scottish Highlands. It reaches a height of 939 metres (3081 feet) and is the most westerly of the ten Munros in the Mamores. It has a lower peak to the west, Meall a' Chaorainn (910 m). To the east, it is linked to the neighbouring mountain Stob Bàn by a bealach at a height of 846 metres; these two Munros are often climbed together from Glen Nevis.

== Landscape ==
Mullach nan Coirean stands in stark contrast to the adjoining Stob Bàn, which is a pointed and light-shaded peak, owing to its crown of quartzite. Mullach nan Coirean is a large sprawling mountain of ridges and corries, with its granite rock giving it a red shade (see picture). The mountain has three north-facing corries: the finest of these is Coire Dearg (Red Corrie) which is drained by the Allt a' Choire Dheirg into Glen Nevis and is overlooked by Mullach nan Coirean's South East Top (917 metres) which is listed as a "top" in Munro's Tables. The South East Top was previously called "Coire Dearg Top" but was changed to avoid confusion as the main summit also overlooks Coire Dearg. The other two northern corries are smaller: Coire Riabhach also drains to Glen Nevis while Coire a' Mhuillinn empties further west into the River Kiachnish which delineates the mountain's western boundary. A fourth corrie, Coire Carach stands on the mountain's southern slopes.

Mullach nan Coirean has four ridges radiating from its summit. The eastern ridge links to the adjoining Munro of Stob Bàn, which is three kilometres away, whilst the south western ridge links to the subsidiary top of Meall a' Chaorainn (910 metres) before descending steeply to the glen of the River Kiachnish. The northern ridge is four kilometres long and has the vitrified fort of Dùn Deardail ("Fort of the Red Eye") near its end, just before it joins Glen Nevis. The fort is probably named after Deirdre, the princess of Ulster, and is one in a line of vitrified forts that stretches from Craig Phàdraig (near Inverness) to the west coast. The northeast ridge also descends to Glen Nevis but is much shorter. The mountain's lower northern slopes are covered by the coniferous woodland of the Nevis Forest.

== Climbing ==
Mullach nan Coirean is often climbed together with the neighbouring Stob Bàn; this walk starts at Achriabhach and climbs Coire a' Mhusgain before crossing Stob Bàn to reach Mullach nan Coirean. A direct ascent of the mountain starts at the same place and goes through the Nevis Forest to reach Mullach nan Coirean's northeast ridge which is ascended to the summit. The top of the mountain is an excellent place to view Loch Linnhe.
