= Stob Bàn =

Stob Bàn may refer to:

- Stob Bàn (Grey Corries), a 977m Scottish mountain
- Stob Bàn (Mamores), a 999m Scottish mountain
