= Mira Rai =

Nepalese trail runner and sky runner (born 1988)

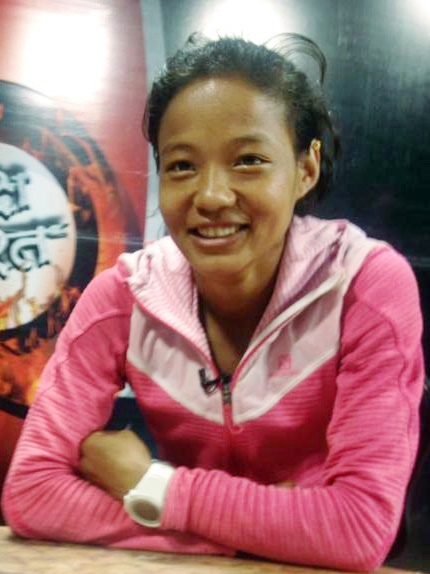

Personal information
- Nationality: Nepalese
- Born: 31 December 1988 (age 37)

Sport
- Country: Nepal
- Sport: Trail running Skyrunning
- Club: Trail Running Nepal

Mira Rai (born 31 December 1988) is a Nepalese trail runner and sky runner. She has participated in many international competitions and has won numerous awards. Though she has never won the title of a World Champion, much of her fame came as a result of winning the 2017 National Geographic Adventurer of the Year title.

== Biography ==
She also participated in some of the world’s most challenging trail races.

=== Early life ===
Mira Rai hails from a remote village in Bhojpur, in the east of the country. Growing up, her family struggled to meet everyday necessities through farming. She left school at age 12 to help her parents with daily household chores, and because her family could not afford her education. She regularly walked up and down the mountainous terrain to collect water and go to market. At the age of 14, she left home in the middle of the night, without telling her parents, to join the Maoist insurgency when they came recruiting through her village. As she was a minor, when the civil war came to an end, she was ineligible for integration into the Nepal Army and was subsequently discharged. After returning home, she dreamed of doing something more with her life to support her family and travelled to Kathmandu to pursue karate and running.

=== Career ===
She was a good runner, but didn’t know what ultra-running was when she participated in her first ultra-marathon, the 50 km Himalayan Outdoor Festival trail race. One morning, when she was running in the hills surrounding Kathmandu, she met a group who were training on the same trails. After running together for some time, they asked her to meet them the following week for another run. When she arrived for that run, she found it was the starting point of the 50 km race. Despite being unprepared, without carrying proper food or water, or wearing technical running clothes, she won the race and caught the attention of race organizers with her positive attitude and dedication to the sport.

After more intensive training for trail running, with her mentor Richard Bull of Trail Running Nepal, she began to travel overseas to participate in international ultra-trail running competitions, where she quickly became a well-known name, winning one race after another and breaking several records. In early 2016, she suffered a knee injury during competition in the United Kingdom and had to take some time off from international competition to recover. During that time, she turned her attention to promoting trail running across Nepal and helping to train other promising young female athletes from rural Nepal to compete on the international stage. She has organized many trail races in Kathmandu and also in her native Bhojpur to promote the sport among Nepali youth. She has been featured in both national and international media, which have covered her life from a remote and rural village to that of a national hero. In a patriarchal society, she has become an inspiration to many girls across the country.

In 2017, Mira re-joined the competitive ultra-trail running world, with her first competition in September 2017 at the 120 km Ben Nevis Ultra Trail Race in Scotland, UK, where she won the race and set a new course record in a time of 14 hours and 24 minutes. She is a professional trail runner and part of the Salomon Running team.

== Achievements ==
These are her main results.

Race of Skyrunner World Series (2 wins)

Year	Date	Race	Position	Notes
2017	16.09	Ben Nevis Ultra	1st	(new record)
2016	30.04	Three Peaks Race	2nd	
2015	19.09	Ultra Pirineu	2nd	
2015	19.07	Dolomites Skyrace	13th	
2015	04.07	Barro Sky Night	1st	
2015	26.06	Mont-Blanc 80 km	1st	(new record)
2015	12.04	Buffalo Stampede Skyrunning	3rd	(42 km 4:52)
2015	21.03	Himalayan Outdoor Festival 50 km	1st	
2015	07.02	MSIG HK50 Sai Kung - Asia Skyrunning Championship	1st	
2015	01.02	King of the Hills	1st	
2015	03.01	The North Face Kathmandu Ultra	1st	
2014	07.12	MSIG Lantau 50 - HK 50 Series	2nd	
2014	05.12	HK MSIG Vertical Kilometer	1st	
2014	28.11	KOTH	2nd	
2014	08.10	Manaslu Trail Race	1st	
2014	26.10	MSIG HK 50 km	1st	(5:30:32 5th overall)
2014	28.09	Trail Degli Eroi (83 km)	1st	(9:16)
2014	13.09	Sellaronda Trail Race (57 km)	1st	(6:36:30)
2014	21.04	Mustang Trail Race	1st	
2014	23.03	Himalayan Outdoor Festival 50 km	1st	
