= Binnein Mòr =

Mountain in Scotland

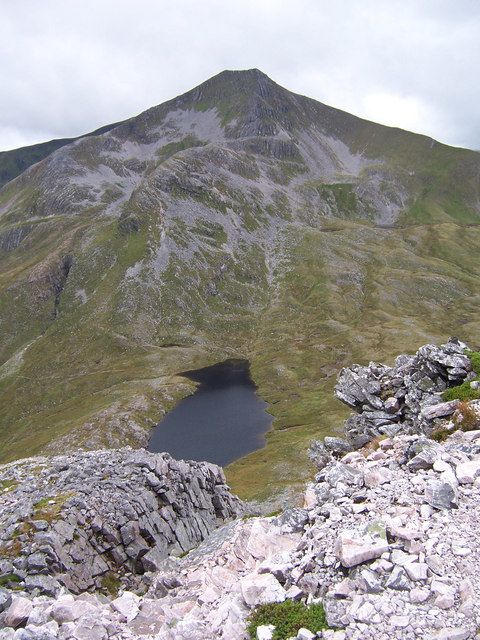
- Binnein Mòr from Binnein Beag

Highest point
- Elevation: 1,130 m (3,710 ft)
- Prominence: 759 m (2,490 ft)
- Parent peak: Ben Nevis
- Listing: Munro, Marilyn
- Coordinates: 56°45′16″N 4°55′27″W

Naming
- English translation: big pinnacle
- Language of name: Gaelic
- Pronunciation: Scottish Gaelic: [ˈpiɲɛɲ ˈmoːɾ] English approximation: BIN-yen-MOR

Geography
- Location within Scotland
- Location: Highland, Scotland
- Parent range: Mamores
- OS grid: NN212663
- Topo map: OS Landranger 41

Binnein Mòr is the highest peak in the Mamores, the range of mountains between Glen Nevis and Loch Leven in the Highlands of Scotland, located about five kilometres north-northeast of Kinlochleven. The pyramidal summit of Binnein Mòr lies above the uninhabited upper section of Glen Nevis, north of the main Mamores ridge. To the south, a short narrow ridge links to the main ridge at an unnamed 1062 m subsidiary top listed in Munro's Tables as Binnein Mòr south top. Binnein Mòr's second subsidiary top, Sgòr Eilde Beag (956 m), lies about a kilometre to the southeast and forms the eastern end of the main Mamores ridge.

Despite being the highest mountain in the Mamores, Binnein Mòr is not one of the most commonly visited, due in part to its relative remoteness. It is most frequently climbed from Kinlochleven, often together with Na Gruagaichean, the next peak to the west.

== See also ==
- Ben Nevis
- List of Munro mountains
- Mountains and hills of Scotland
