= Achriabhach =

Coordinates: 56.770°N 5.042°W

Scottish Gaelic: An t-Achadh Riabhach
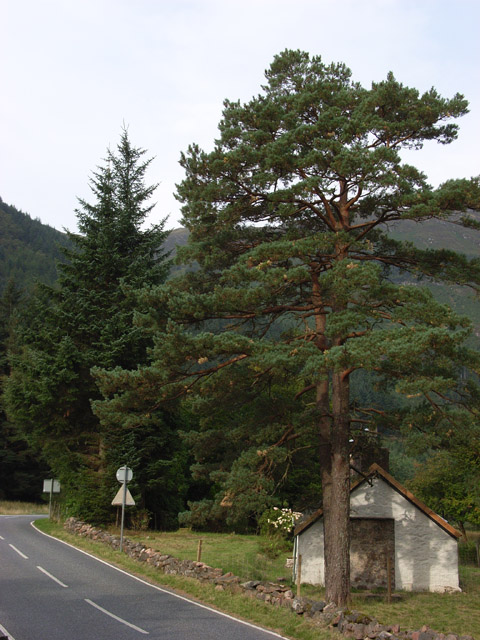
- Beside the road through Glen Nevis

- Location within the Lochaber area
- OS grid reference: NN142684
- Council area: Highland
- Country: Scotland
- Sovereign state: United Kingdom
- UK Parliament: Inverness, Skye and West Ross-shire
- Scottish Parliament: Skye, Lochaber and Badenoch

Achriabhach (Scottish Gaelic: An t-Achadh Riabhach) is a hamlet in Glen Nevis, Lochaber, Highland, Scotland.

Achriabhach is adjacent to the Ben Nevis Site of Special Scientific Interest as designated by Scottish Natural Heritage.
