= Mamores =

Coordinates: 56.750°N 4.969°W

The Mamores are a group of mountains in the Lochaber area of the Grampian Mountains in the Scottish Highlands. They form an east–west ridge approximately fifteen kilometres in length lying between Glen Nevis to the north and Loch Leven to the south.

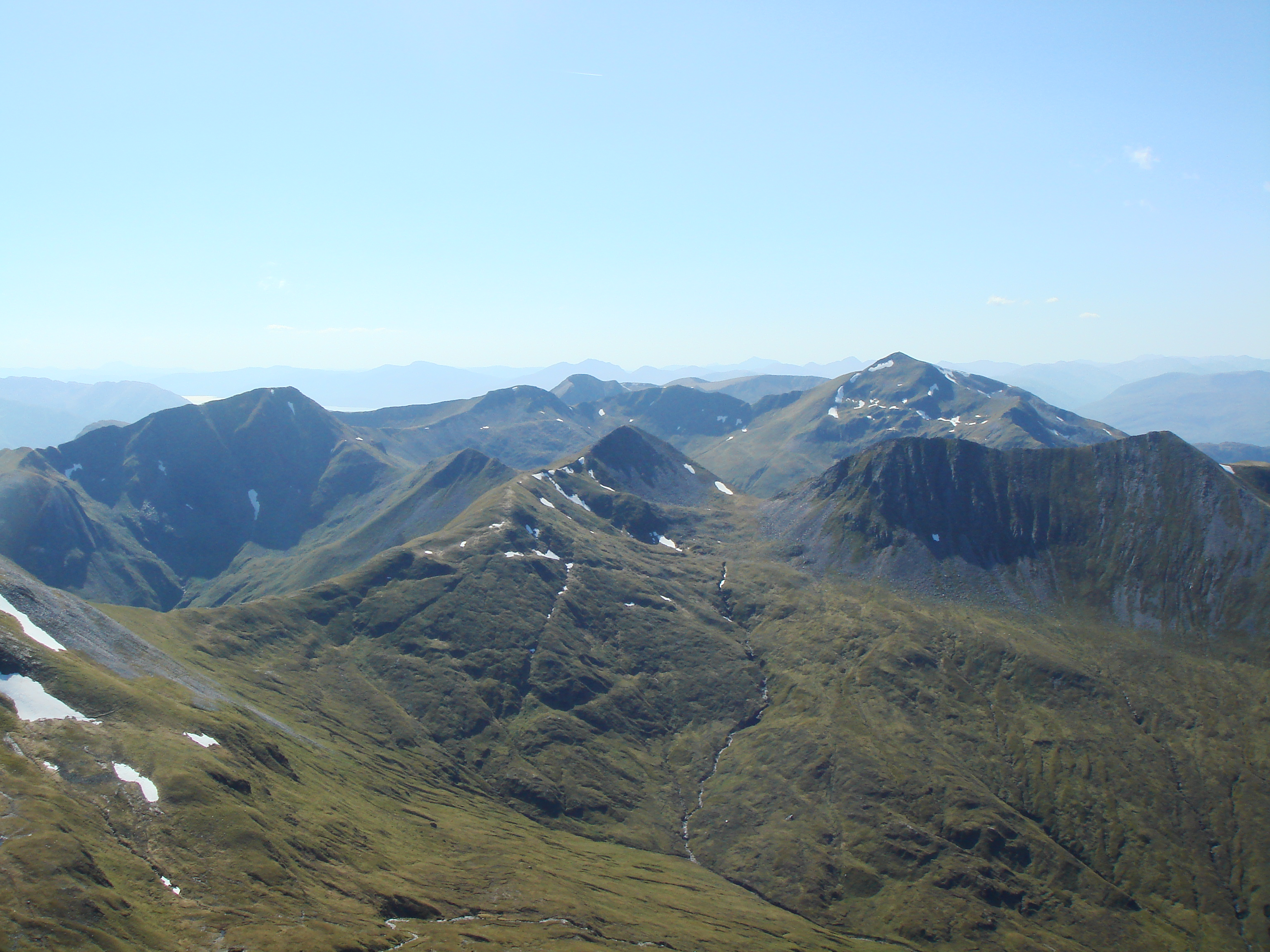
The Mamores

Ten of the peaks are classified as Munros. The peaks are listed below with their heights (from west to east):

- Mullach nan Coirean (939 metres (3,081 ft))
- Stob Bàn (999 metres (3,278 ft))
- Sgurr a' Mhàim (1,099 metres (3,606 ft))
- Sgor an Iobhair (1,001 metres (3,284 ft))
- Am Bodach (1,032 metres (3,386 ft))
- Stob Coire a' Chàirn (981 metres (3,219 ft))
- An Gearanach (982 metres (3,222 ft))
- Na Gruagaichean (1,055 metres (3,461 ft))
- Binnein Mòr (1,128 metres (3,701 ft))
- Binnein Beag (940 metres (3,080 ft))
- Sgurr Eilde Mòr (1,008 metres (3,307 ft))

The main backbone of the Mamores stretches from Meall a' Chaorainn, a subsidiary top of Mullach nan Coirean, at the western end of the ridge, to Sgòr Eilde Beag, a top of Binnein Mòr some 10 km to the east. Three narrow arêtes run north from the main ridge connecting to the summits of Sgurr a' Mhàim, An Gearanach and Binnein Mòr. Beyond the eastern end of the ridge are two steep outlying peaks: Binnein Beag and Sgurr Eilde Mòr. Sandwiched between the remote upper section of Glen Nevis, and Lochs Eilde Mòr and Eilde Beag, these two peaks are the remotest in the Mamores.

For hillwalkers the Mamores are accessible from either side - the village of Kinlochleven lies on the southern side, whilst upper Glen Nevis gives access from the north. The full traverse is challenging, either as a long day for fit walkers or as a multi-day trip. Given the relative ease of access, several peaks can be combined to give a number of shorter day's walking. Probably the best known shorter route is the Ring of Steall, a circuit of the corrie above Steall Falls. This route takes in four Munro peaks: Sgurr a' Mhàim, Am Bodach, Stob Coire a' Chàirn and An Gearanach. It forms the basis for the Ring of Steall Skyrace course.
