= Binnein Beag =

Mountain in Highland, Scotland

Coordinates: 56.767467°N 4.910328°W

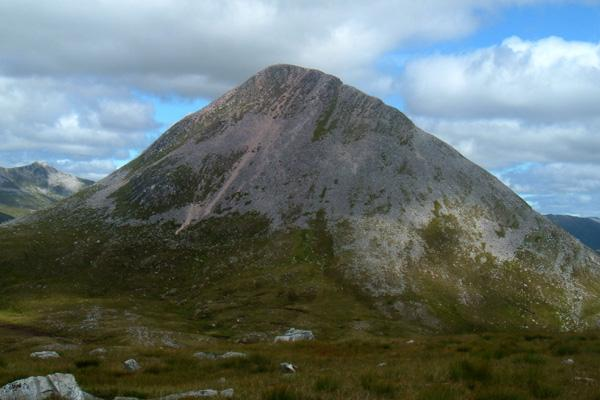
- Binnein Beag

Highest point
- Elevation: 943 m (3,094 ft)
- Prominence: 197 m (646 ft)
- Parent peak: Binnein Mòr
- Listing: Munro, Marilyn

Naming
- English translation: small peak
- Language of name: Gaelic
- Pronunciation: Scottish Gaelic: [ˈpiɲɛɲ ˈpek] English approximation: BIN-yen-BEK

Geography
- Location: Highland, Scotland
- Parent range: Mamores
- OS grid: NN221677
- Topo map: OS Landranger 41, OS Explorer 392

Binnein Beag is a Scottish mountain situated at the eastern end of the Mamores range seven kilometres north north-east of Kinlochleven. It is a relatively small, conical peak which is connected to its larger neighbour, Binnein Mòr, by a bealach at 750m. Despite being overshadowed by Binnein Mòr, it is listed as a Munro with a height of 943 m (3094 ft). It is commonly climbed from Kinlochleven in combination with Binnein Mòr. Its summit gives good views of Ben Alder to the east, the Grey Corries to the north, and the vast bulk of Binnein Mòr to the south-west.
