= Sgùrr a' Mhàim =

Mountain in Scotland

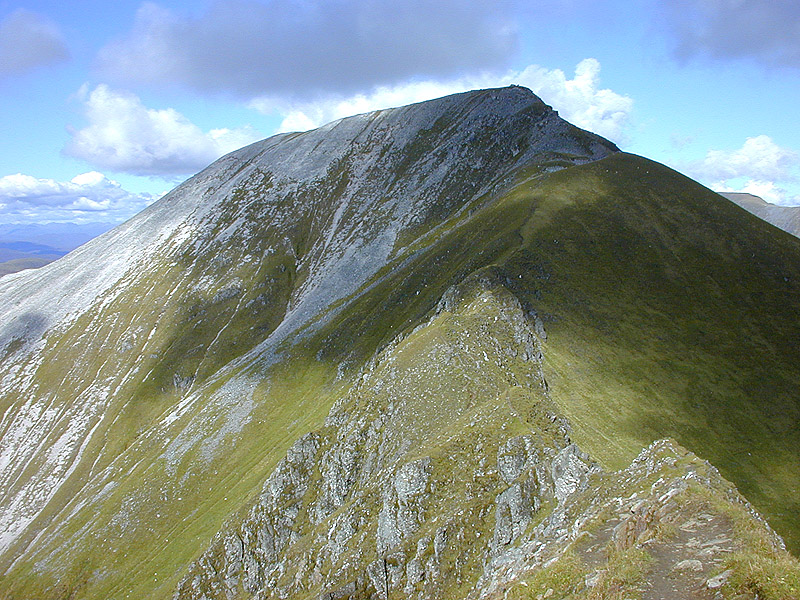
- Sgùrr a' Mhàim with its quartzite cap seen from the Devil’s Ridge

Highest point
- Elevation: 1,099 m (3,606 ft)
- Prominence: 316 m (1,037 ft)
- Parent peak: Binnein Mòr
- Listing: Munro, Marilyn
- Coordinates: 56.7559°N 5.0038°W

Naming
- English translation: peak of the large rounded hill
- Language of name: Gaelic

Geography
- Location: Lochaber, Scotland
- Parent range: Mamores
- OS grid: NN164667
- Topo map: OS Landranger 41, OS Explorer 392

Listed summits of Sgùrr a' Mhàim
| Name | Grid ref | Height | Status |
|---|---|---|---|
| Sgùrr an Iubhair | NN165655 | 1,001 m (3,284 ft) | Munro Top |
| Stob Choire a’ Mhàil | N163659 | 990 m (3,248 ft) | Munro Top |

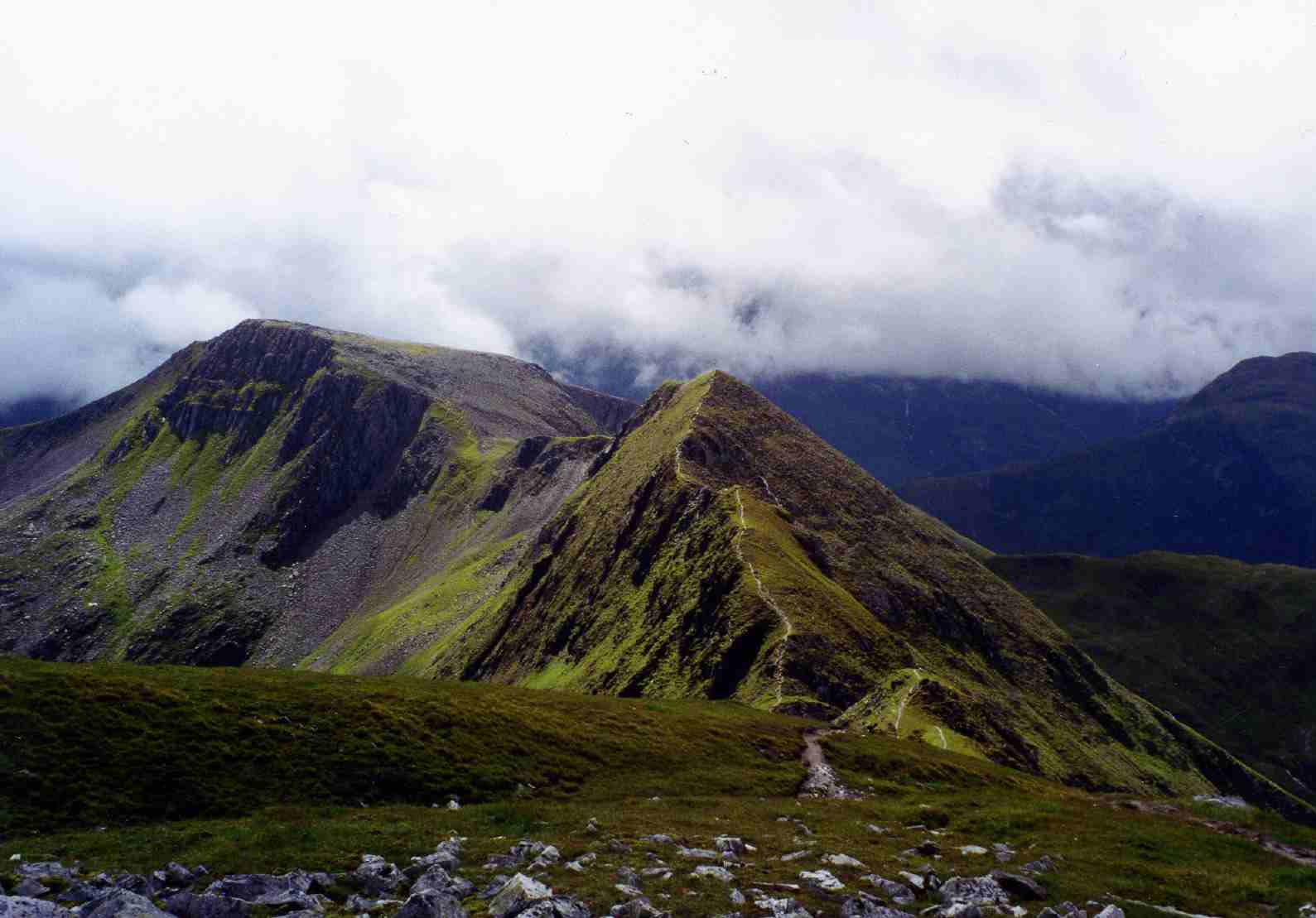
Looking along the Devil’s Ridge from the lower slopes of Sgùrr a' Mhàim. The demoted Munro Sgor an Iubhair is on the left hand side.

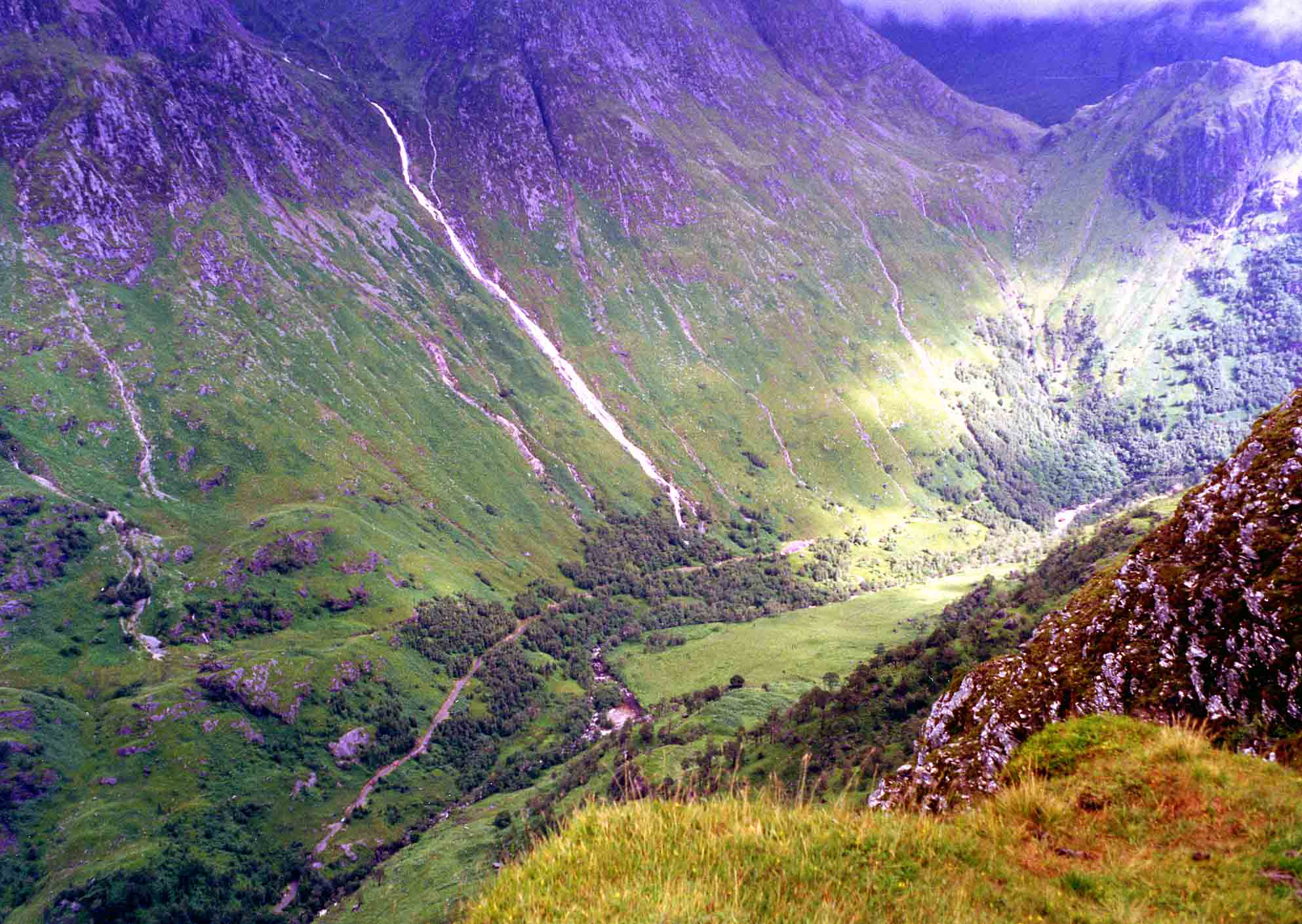
Upper Glen Nevis from the summit of Sgùrr a' Mhàim. The Allt Coire Eoghainn can be seen cascading from Coire Eoghainn on Ben Nevis down to the glen.

Sgùrr a' Mhàim (Scottish Gaelic: [ˈs̪kuːrˠ ə ˈvãːjm]) (Scottish Gaelic for 'rocky peak of the rounded hill') is a mountain of the Mamores range in the Scottish Highlands. It is directly south of Ben Nevis, on the other side of Glen Nevis. With a height of 1,099 metres (3,605 feet), Sgùrr a' Mhàim is a Munro and the second-highest peak in the Mamores. Its cap of quartzite stones give it a light grey appearance which can be mistaken for a covering of snow.

== Landscape ==
Sgùrr a' Mhàim is the first or last peak of the 'Ring of Steall', a ridge walk taking in the other Munros of An Gearanach, Stob Coire a' Chàirn and Am Bodach. It is linked to the main spine of the Mamore group on its southern side by a feature called The Devil's Ridge, which is a one-kilometre undulating ridge with a few exposed sections which require care. The most difficult part is a rock gap known as 'The Bad Step' with Scottish hill walker Hamish Brown commenting, "The ‘Bad Step’ on the ridge is perhaps exaggerated - it can be jumped across. If you missed of course, a couple of bounces would land you down in the corries".

The Devil's Ridge has its own peak at the midpoint called Stob Choire a' Mhàil (990 metres high). At the southern end of the ridge is Sgùrr an Iubhair ('peak of the yew'), a 1,001 m peak that briefly gained Munro status in 1981 only to lose it again in 1997. When viewed from the ridge, Sgùrr an Iubhair appears to be a separate mountain, but both the above peaks are listed as "tops" of Sgùrr a' Mhàim in the Munro Tables. Sgùrr a' Mhàim's northern side contrasts to its southern flank (where the Devil's Ridge is). The northern slopes drop steeply to Glen Nevis, and there are two corries which end abruptly in cliffs which fall steeply into the Nevis gorge.

== Climbing ==
From the northern flank, the mountain can be ascended directly using one of the three ridges that descend to the glen. The most popular of these is up the north west ridge from Achriabhach where there is a carpark but it is also possible to ascend from upper Glen Nevis via the north east or east ridges which spring from the Allt Coire a' Mhàil above the An Steall Ban waterfall. Both these routes require some scrambling. A more circuitous ascent goes up to the head of Coire a' Mhusgain from Achriabhach to cross the ridge to the summit. The summit cairn is substantial being made up of light coloured quartzite stones and gives a view of the southern side of Ben Nevis, and also an aerial view down into Glen Nevis.
