= Stob Coire a' Chàirn =

Mountain in Scotland

Coordinates: 56.75018°N 4.96996°W

Stob Coire a’ Chàirn
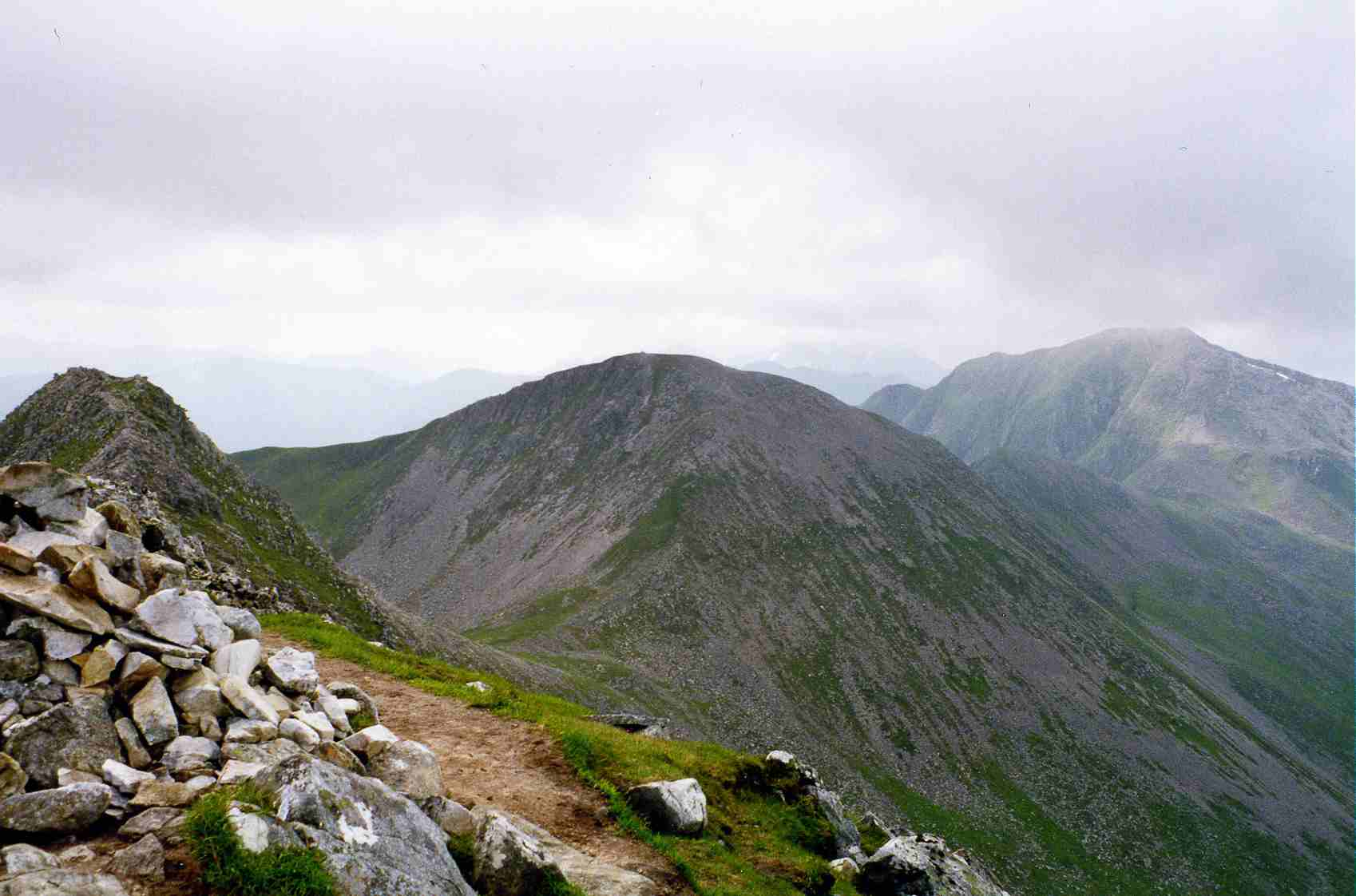
- Stob Choire a’ Chàirn with Am Bodach in the distance seen from An Gearanach, One Km to the north.

Highest point
- Elevation: 981 m (3,219 ft)
- Prominence: 124 m (407 ft)
- Parent peak: An Gearanach
- Listing: Munro

Naming
- English translation: Peak of the Corrie of the Cairn
- Language of name: Gaelic
- Pronunciation: Scottish Gaelic: [ˈs̪t̪op ˈkʰɔɾʲ ə ˈxaːrˠn] English approximation: stop-KOR-yə-KHARN

Geography
- Location: Highland, Scotland
- Parent range: Mamores
- OS grid: NN185660
- Topo map: OS Landranger 41, OS Explorers 392

Stob Coire a’ Chàirn is a Scottish mountain situated in the Mamores range, 3.5 kilometres north of Kinlochleven. The mountain reaches a height of 981 metres (3218 feet) and is regarded as one of the more modest peaks of the ten Munros in the Mamores, indeed for many years it was not named on OS maps. Despite this, it is situated at a strategically important point and could be said to be the most central of the group with three ridges radiating out to other Munros. The mountains name translates from Gaelic as “Peak of the Corrie of the Cairn”.

Stob Coire a’ Chàirn, despite its Munro status is probably best known for being part of the Ring of Steall which is regarded as one of the best ridge walks in Scotland which also takes in the other Munros of An Gearanach, Am Bodach and Sgurr a' Mhàim. Stob Coire a’ Chàirn has three main ridges, the northern one connects to An Gearanach, the south east to Na Gruagaichean and the south west to Am Bodach. On the southern flank of the mountain is the broad expanse of the Coire na Ba which is drained by the Allt Coire na Ba which flows south to join the River Leven at Kinlochleven. Coire na Ba has an excellent and well graded stalkers path which gives easy access to the Mamores ridge from the south.

The direct ascent of Stob Coire a’ Chàirn starts at Kinlochleven and uses the aforementioned stalkers path up Coire na Ba to reach the east ridge of the mountain which is followed to the summit. Because of its central position in the Mamores, Stob Coire a’ Chàirn is usually climbed with other Munros in the group and many permutations are possible. The summit of the mountain is marked by a rough pile of stones with the outlook from the top giving a good view of Glen Coe and its hills.
