= Càrn Mòr Dearg =

Mountain in the Scottish Highlands

Coordinates: 56.80549°N 4.98744°W

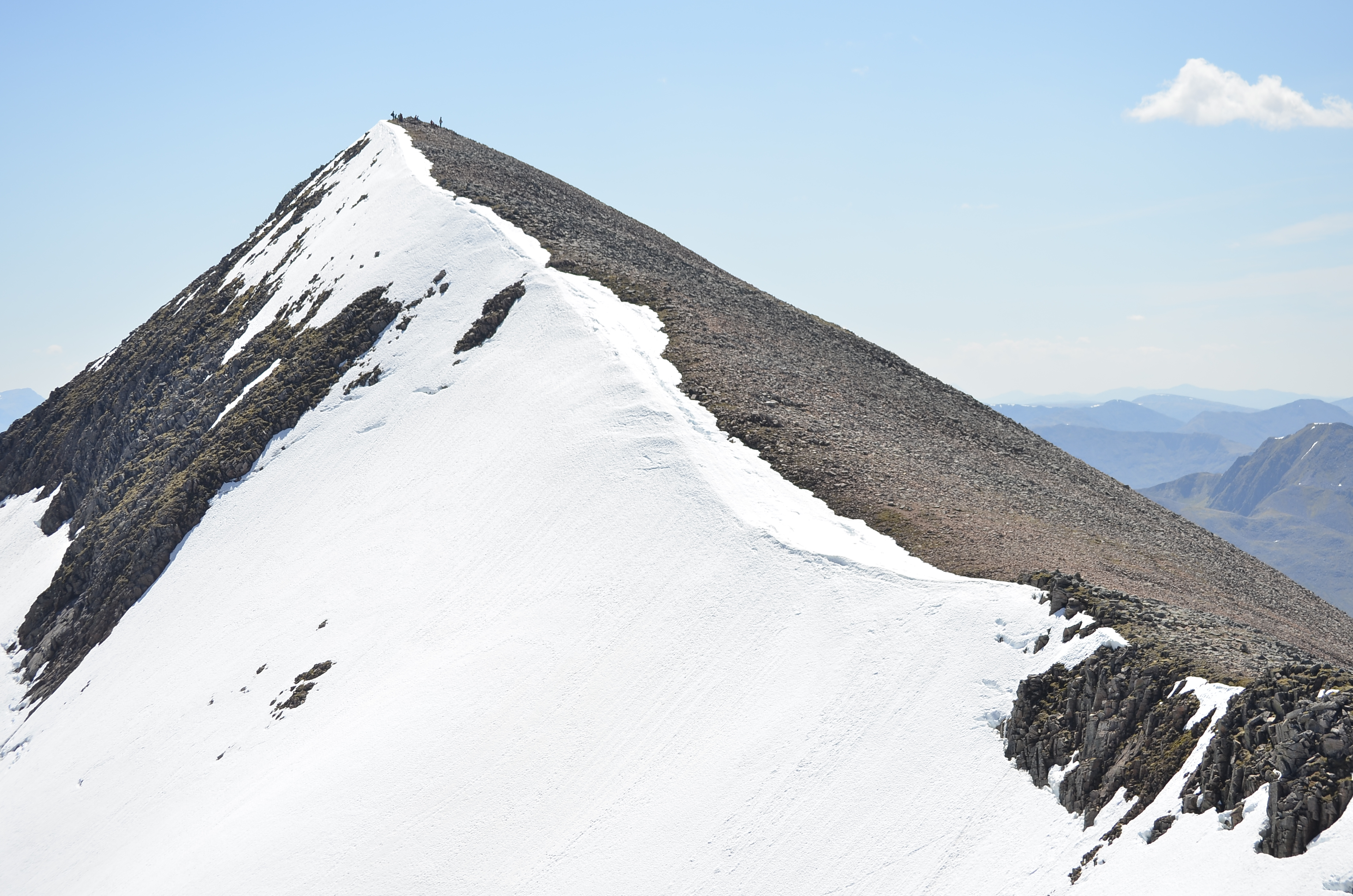
- Càrn Mòr Dearg, with several climbers on the summit

Highest point
- Elevation: 1,221.1 m (4,006 feet)
- Prominence: 164.1 m (538 ft)
- Parent peak: Ben Nevis
- Listing: Munro, Marilyn

Naming
- English translation: Great red cairn
- Language of name: Scottish Gaelic
- Pronunciation: Scottish Gaelic: [ˈkʰaːrˠn ˈmoːɾ ˈtʲɛɾɛk] English approximation: KARN-mor-JERR-ek

Geography
- Location: Lochaber, Scotland
- Parent range: Grampian Mountains
- OS grid: NN177722
- Topo map: OS Landranger 41

Càrn Mòr Dearg (Scottish Gaelic for 'great red cairn') is the eighth-highest mountain in Scotland and the British Isles, with a height of 1,221.1 metres (4,006 ft). It stands a short distance northeast of Ben Nevis, the highest mountain in Britain, to which it is linked by the Càrn Mòr Dearg arête (commonly abbreviated to "CMD arête"). Along with Càrn Dearg Meadhanach ("middle red cairn") and Càrn Beag Dearg ("little red cairn"), it makes up the eastern ridge of the horseshoe-shaped Ben Nevis massif in the Scottish Highlands.

== Climbing ==
The ascent of Càrn Mòr Dearg from the north (start from the North Face Car Park), the traverse of the arête, and the scramble up the north side of Ben Nevis make one of the best horse-shoe routes in Scotland.

== Snow sports ==
Càrn Mòr Dearg is attractive to ski mountaineers and off piste skiers and boarders. In good conditions the summit can be reached from the nearby Nevis Range Ski areas in two hours or less. With enough snow, the descent from the summit to the CIC Hut gives a long, pleasant grade 1 descent. The eastern flank of the mountain has three fine bowls which give descents graded between 2 and 5 in K. Biggin's guide.

== Gallery ==
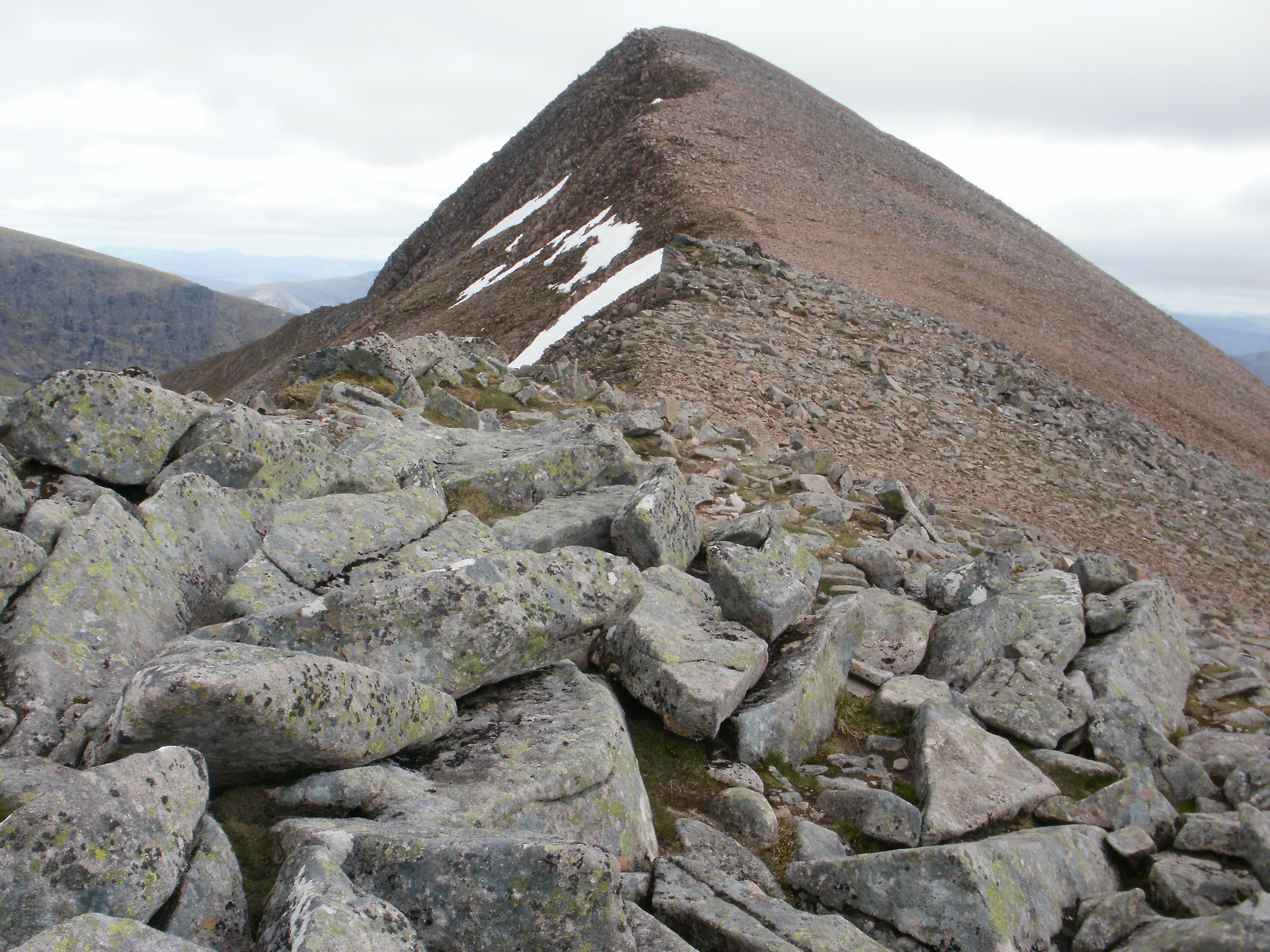
Càrn Mòr Dearg summit

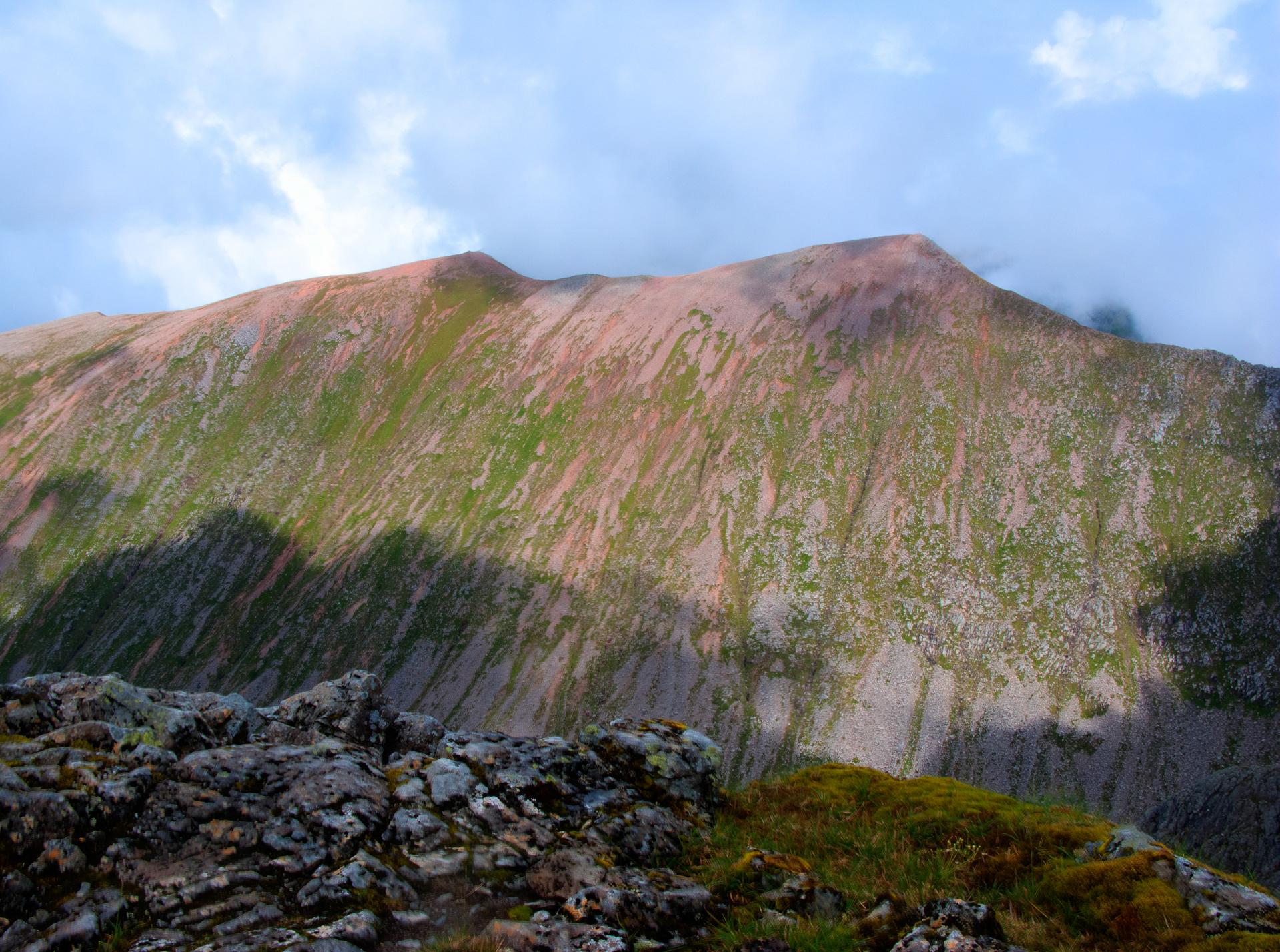
Càrn Mòr Dearg and Càrn Dearg Meadhanach, from Ben Nevis to the west

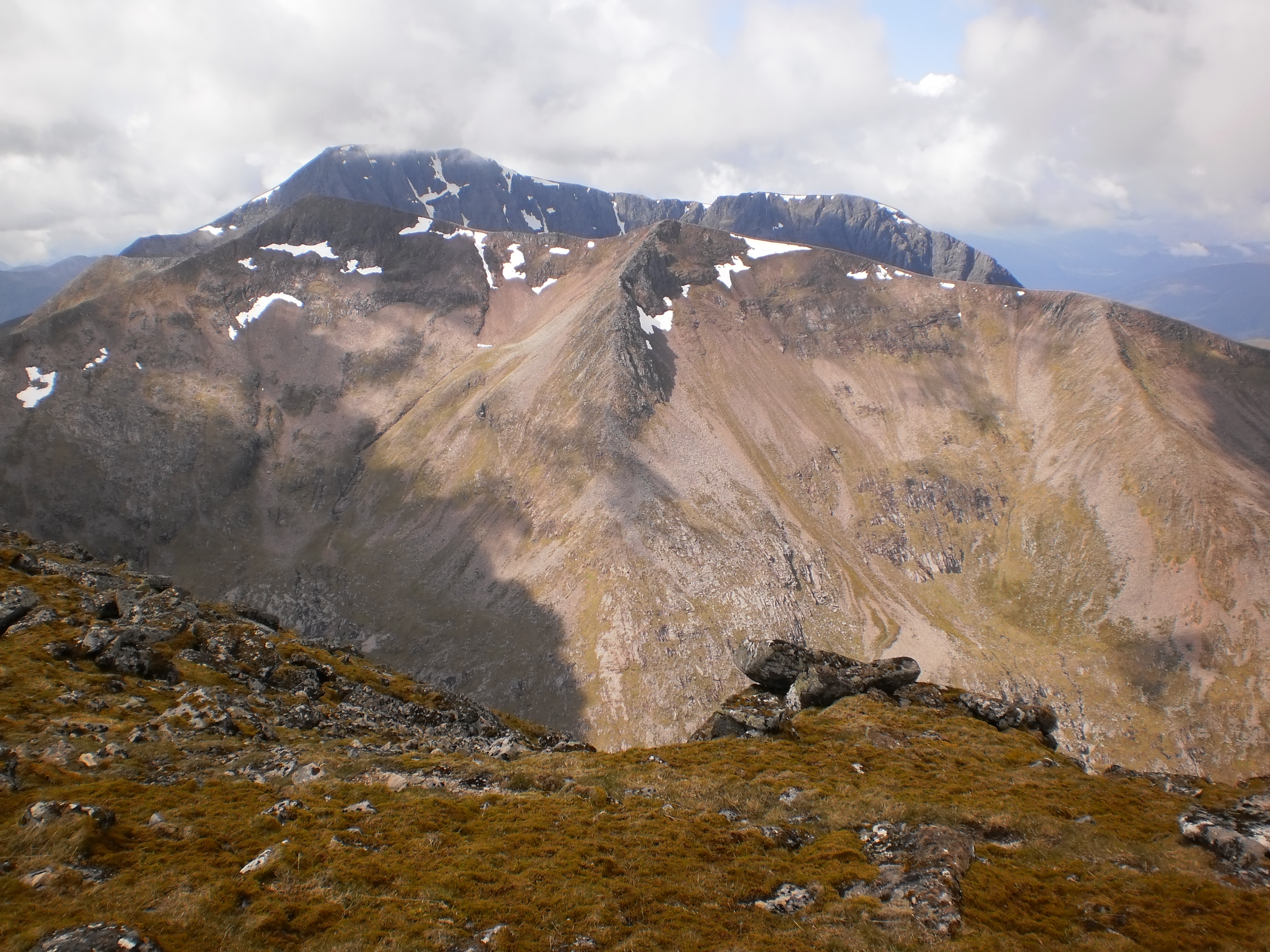
Càrn Mòr Dearg (left), Càrn Dearg Meadhanach (middle) and Càrn Beag Dearg (right), with Ben Nevis behind, from Aonach Mòr to the east

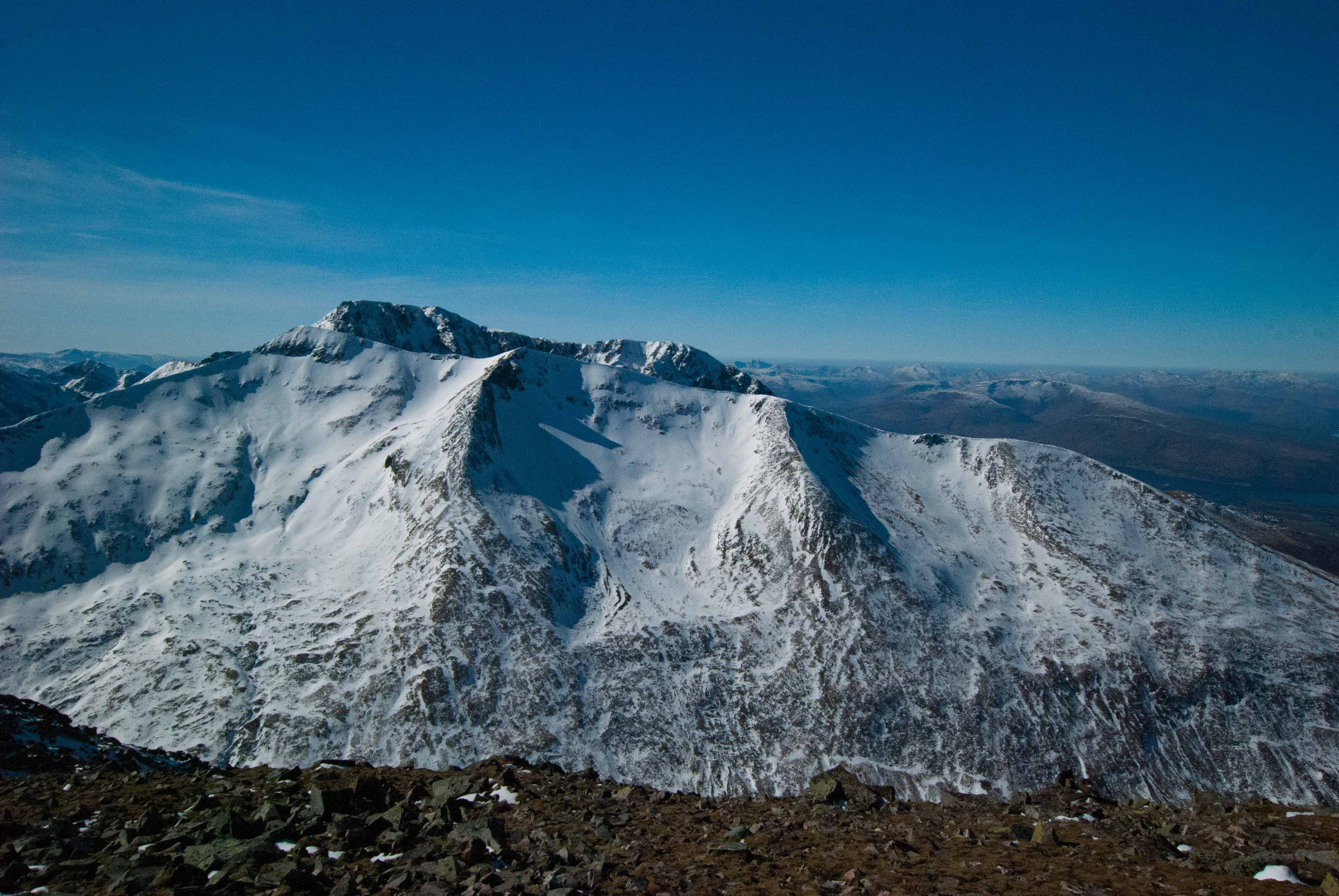
Càrn Mòr Dearg from Aonach Mòr showing the snow bowl that attracts off-piste snowsports enthusiasts

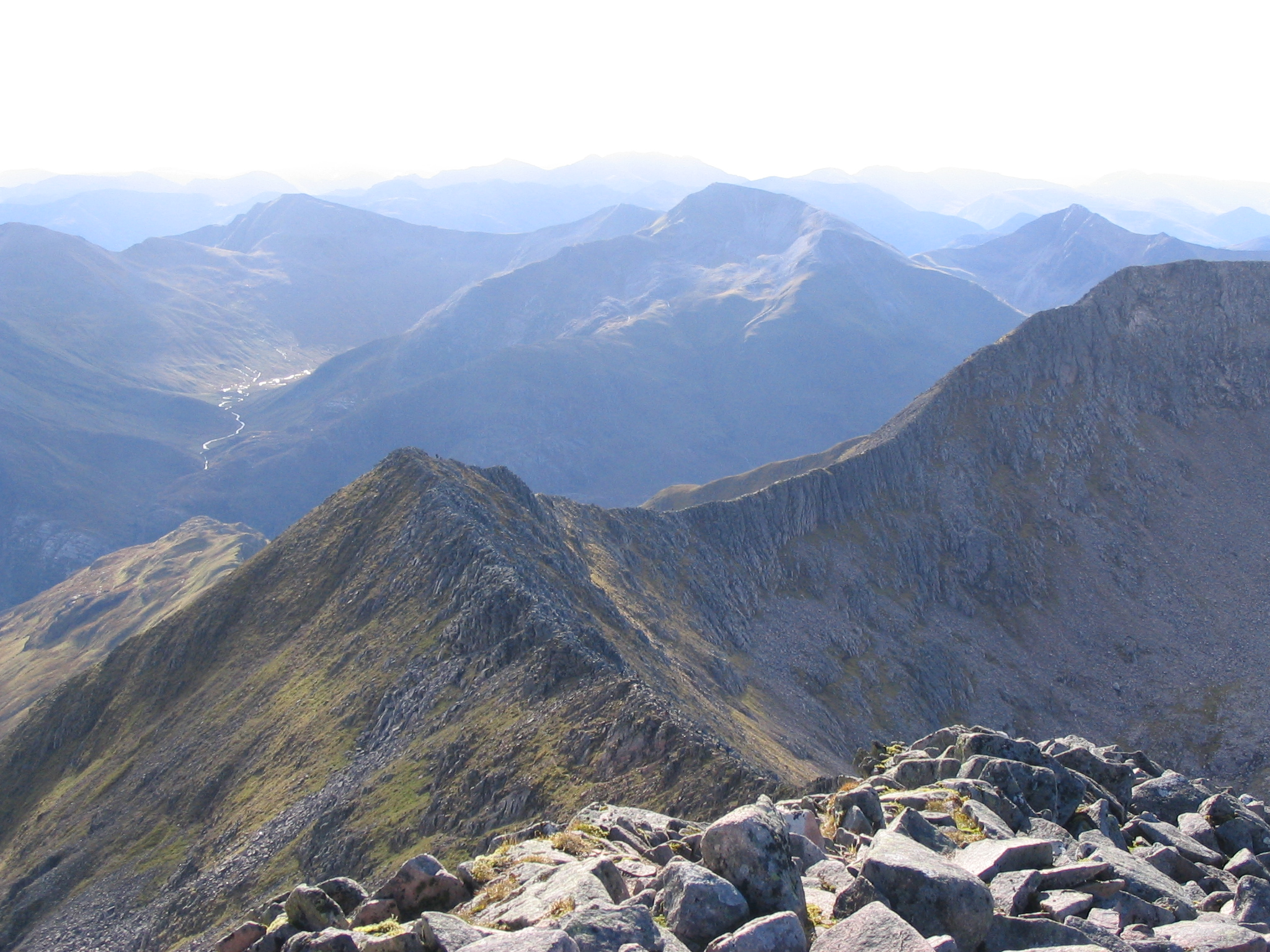
Càrn Mòr Dearg arête

== See also ==
- Geology of Scotland
- List of Munro mountains
- Mountains and hills of Scotland
