= Glen Nevis =

Valley in Scotland

Coordinates: 56°46′14″N 5°2′8″W

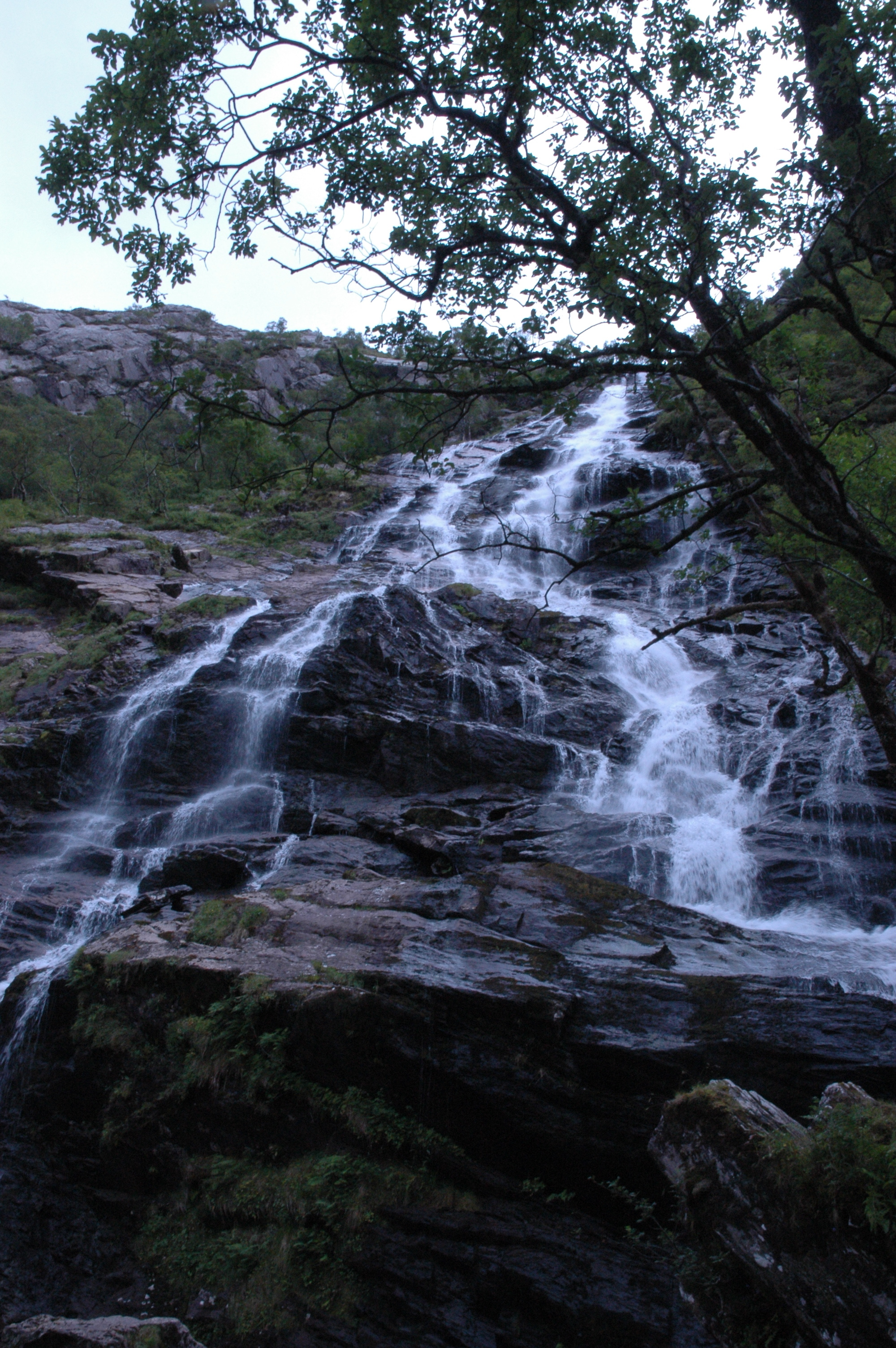
The Steall Falls from below

Glen Nevis (Scottish Gaelic: Gleann Nibheis) is a glen in Lochaber, Highland, Scotland, with Fort William at its foot. It is bordered to the south by the Mamore range, and to the north by the highest mountains in the British Isles: Ben Nevis, Càrn Mor Dearg, Aonach Mòr, and Aonach Beag. It is home to one of the three highest waterfalls in Scotland, Steall Falls, where the Allt Coire a'Mhail joins the Water of Nevis in the glen. Below the waterfall is a steeply walled and impressive gorge. The scenic beauty of the glen has led to its inclusion in the Ben Nevis and Glen Coe National Scenic Area, one of 40 such areas in Scotland. Several films have been shot in Glen Nevis, including some scenes from the Harry Potter movies, Highlander, Highlander III: The Sorcerer, Braveheart and Rob Roy.

A public road runs for 10 km up the Glen, becoming single track after 7 km. There is a hotel, Scottish Youth Hostels Association hostel, and campsite at the bottom of the glen, near Fort William, and a small hamlet further up at Achriabhach.

From the car park at the end of the Glen Nevis road, a path continues through a gorge. After a scramble up this rocky path, the view opens up and the path leads into the peaceful upper glen. A wire bridge crosses to the base of the waterfall. This bridge was closed for three months in 2010 when one of the cables snapped.

== Risks ==
The path has been improved periodically to ease access and to reduce the damaging effects of soil erosion caused by many walkers, but it remains challenging in places and, as the sign at the car park warns, potentially fatal. There have been several accidents in Glen Nevis, including the death of a young walker in August 2006. In 2020, a 42-year-old hiker fell from the Stob Ban path and was fatally injured. In April 2025, a 37-year-old man died after falling while climbing in Glen Nevis.

== Glen Nevis river race ==
A two-mile (three-kilometre) race down the River Nevis has been run in the summer since 1973. Competitors use floating aids such as LiLos to navigate the river. The race can take from 20 minutes to 2 hours dependent upon water flow. After a hiatus of several years, the race was run again from 2008 to the present.

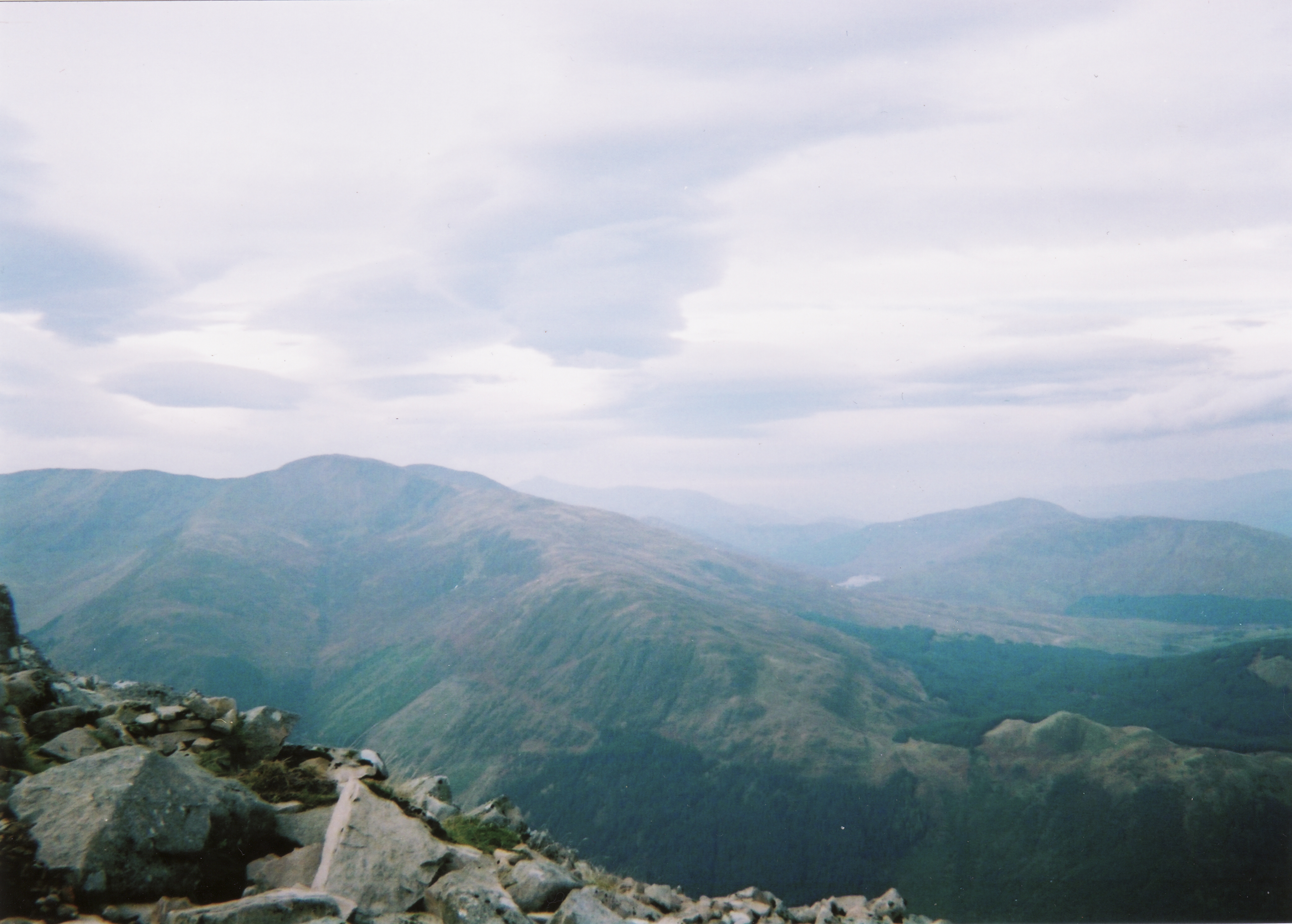
View of Glen Nevis from Ben Nevis
