= Kinlochleven =

Coordinates: 56.713248°N 4.965287°W

Kinlochleven: Scottish Gaelic: Ceann Loch Lìobhann
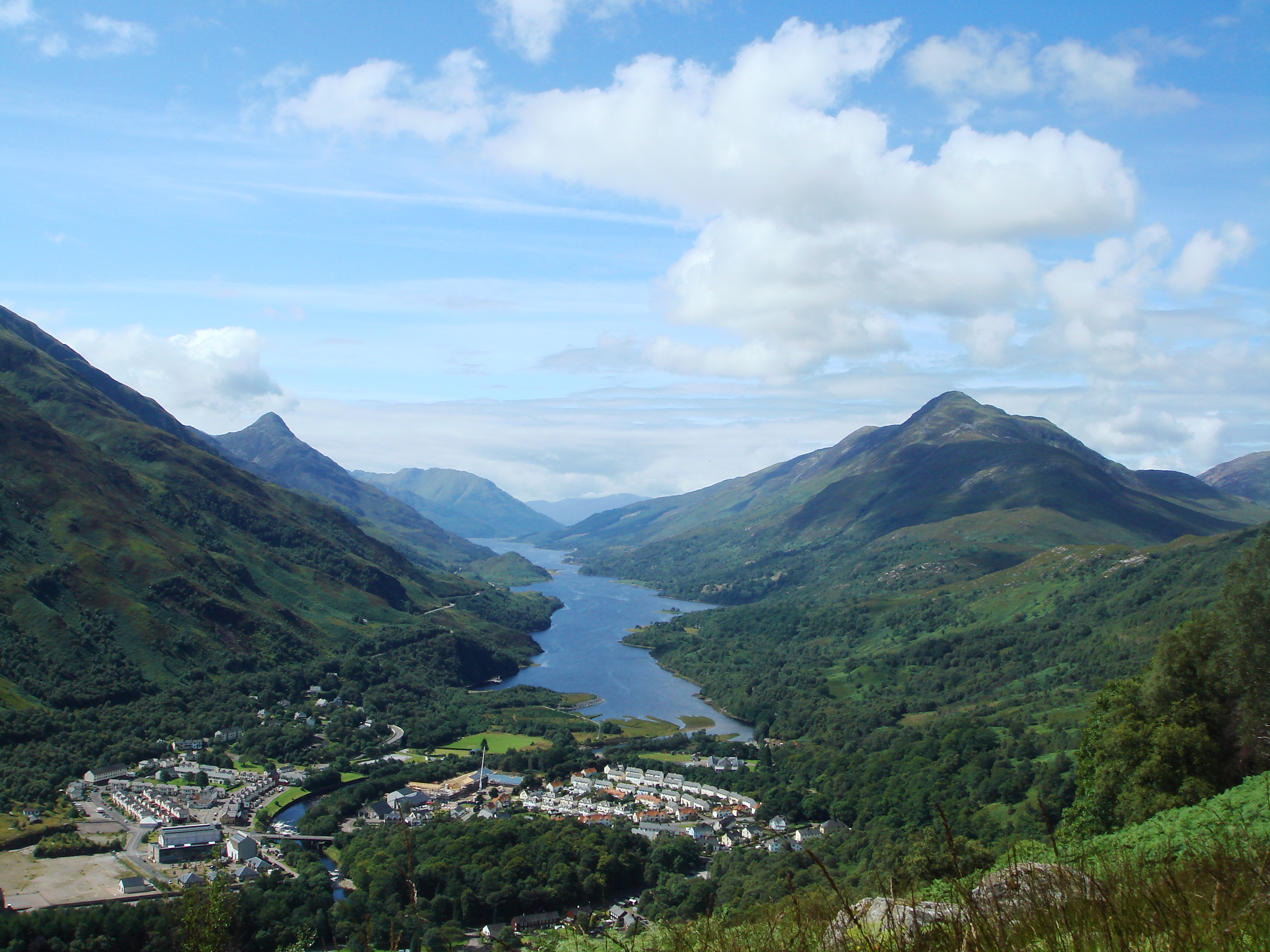
- Kinlochleven

- Location within the Lochaber area
- Population: 760 (2020)
- OS grid reference: NN186618
- Council area: Highland
- Country: Scotland
- Sovereign state: United Kingdom
- Post town: KINLOCHLEVEN
- Postcode district: PH50
- Dialling code: 01855
- Police: Scotland
- Fire: Scottish
- Ambulance: Scottish
- UK Parliament: Argyll, Bute and South Lochaber
- Scottish Parliament: Skye, Lochaber and Badenoch

Kinlochleven (/ˌkɪnlɒxˈliːvən/) (Scottish Gaelic: Ceann Loch Lìobhann) is a village located at the eastern end of Loch Leven, Lochaber, Scottish Highlands. To the north lies the Mamores ridge; to the south are mountains flanking Glen Coe.

Kinlochleven as it is now known, was formed from two previously separate small communities divided by the River Leven following construction of an aluminium smelter; Kinlochmore to the north in Inverness-shire and Kinlochbeg to the south in Argyll. The processing plant was powered by a hydroelectric scheme situated in the mountains above, and made Kinlochleven the first village in the world to have every house connected to electricity, coining the phrase "The Electric Village". In 1991, the village (according to annual census returns) had just over 1000 inhabitants in some 420 households. Today, Kinlochleven is a notable tourist destination for hiking, mountaineering and stopping-point on the West Highland Way.

== Smelter ==
Work on the dam and water supply system began in 1905 and was completed in 1907. The hydro-electric scheme was constructed for the British Aluminium Company and was designed by engineer brothers Patrick and Charles Meik. The chief assistant resident engineer on the project was a young William Halcrow. The scheme involved the construction of a gravity dam over 914 m long (the longest in the Highlands) and 27 m high, creating the Blackwater Reservoir. It was built at an elevation of over 305 m in rugged and almost inaccessible terrain, and involved the construction of some 6 km of concrete aqueduct and nearly 13 km of steel pipe. It has been described as the last major creation of the traditional 'navvy' whose activities in the construction of canals and railways left an indelible mark on the British countryside.

The construction of the Blackwater Dam and the associated aluminium smelter featured in the novel Children of the Dead End by Patrick MacGill who worked on the project as a navvie. Some incidents in the book were based on actual characters and events on the Blackwater site; for example, one morning a worker drove his pick into a rock, inadvertently hitting a buried explosive charge which drove his pick into his neck and killed him. This incident was recorded as happening to an Inverness man in April 1908.

The British Aluminium Company was merged in 1982 with the Canadian company Alcan to form British Alcan. In November 2007, British Alcan was acquired by Rio Tinto and became Rio Tinto Alcan.

In its early days the aluminium reduction plant employed some 700 people. Although producing some of the highest grade aluminium, its small size in comparison to modern US smelters led to its closure in June 2000. The associated hydro-electric plant was converted into a general purpose power station connected to the National Grid.

== Tourism ==
Kinlochleven is the penultimate stop on the West Highland Way and an important tourism destination in the Scottish Highlands. The village lies at the head of the fjord-like Loch Leven and is surrounded on three sides by steep mountains. There are 10 Munro mountains (mountains over 3,000 feet or 914.4 metres) in the Mamores above Kinlochleven with Binnein Mòr the highest. Indeed, the area around and above Kinlochleven contains more wild mountain land than all of the mountain national parks in England and Wales combined. There is a significant network of mountain biking and hiking trails, and the Ice Factor National Ice Climbing Centre, one of the top five visitor attractions in the highlands.

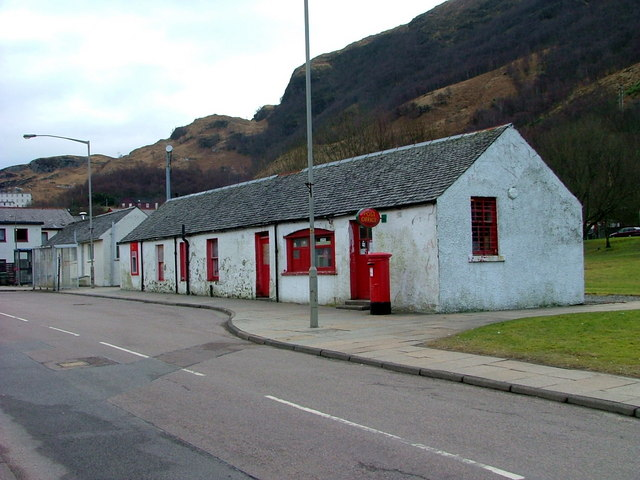
Post office

The West Highland Way attracts over 85,000 walkers each year and plays a vital role in the Kinlochleven economy. An economic impact assessment of Mountaineering confirms the value to the highlands to be £163.7m each year, and because of this there has been continued support to expand the existing long-distance hiking and biking trails. This has seen new developments, such as the Great Glen Way and the Stevenson Way, which follows the route of Alan Breck Stewart and Jamie Balfour as they flee pursuing redcoats in the Kidnapped novel.

There are various accommodation options including hotels, guest houses, bed and breakfast, bunkhouses and campsites in the village, which also has a store, ATM banking facilities. A visitor centre, "The Aluminium Story", tells the story of the creation of the village to serve the aluminium smelting facility.

There is a hostel, microlodge facility and campsite close to the river. It has eight microlodges comprising a mixture of two and four berth accommodation. There are toilets, showers and dishwashing facilities. The refurbished hostel building, located on Lab Road, was previously used as the research and testing facility for British Aluminium.

The Tailrace Inn opened in 1995 and provides accommodation, food and beverages for walkers, visitors and locals alike. It is located centrally in the village and is named after the fast flowing water outlet that enters the River Leven from the power house of the old aluminium factory. The Tailrace can be viewed from the bridge across the river.

=== Ice Factor: The National Ice Climbing Centre ===
A major mountain activity centre, the Ice Factor, opened to the public in 2003. It was formally opened by Queen Elizabeth and Prince Philip on 5 June 2005. It includes the biggest indoor ice climbing wall in the world, the UK's highest indoor articulated rock climbing wall and a competition bouldering wall voted the best in the UK.

Ice Factor catered for climbers and adventure seekers of all ages and abilities, from beginner to expert. In 2010 a new Giant Outdoor Aerial Adventure Course was added. Throughout the year Ice Factor also offers bespoke guided days on the local mountains of Glen Coe and Ben Nevis; each winter it ran specialist winter skills and mountaineering courses. The centre was also an important staging post on the West Highland Way, providing facilities for walkers, including a bar, sauna and steam room. It also had a mountaineers' cafe and a shop stocking gifts and mountaineering and camping equipment. Due to its contribution to the local economy it secured several awards, including Visit Scotland Thistle Awards for Tourism Excellence and a Green Apple Award as Best Environmental Business Europe.

Ice Factor was the base for the Skyline Scotland races in 2016.

Ice Factor closed in March 2023 following an unpaid rent dispute. Plans to reopen in September 2023 came to nothing. In September 2025, it was reported that Ice Factor could reopen under a new operator, a community interest company called Point Five, in 2027.

=== Micro-brewery ===
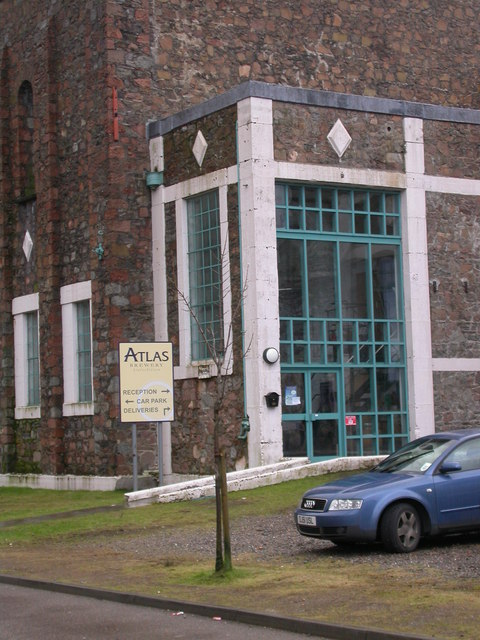
Atlas Brewery

A smaller part of the former coke bunker – for carbon production – for the aluminium reduction works, was transformed in 2002 into Atlas Brewery which, together with Orkney Brewery, was taken over in 2006 to form Sinclair Brewery Ltd. Atlas was closed in July 2010 and its production transferred to Orkney. The micro-brewery was re-opened in 2011 by Harry Heskey (former head brewer for Atlas) and now provides River Leven Ales.

== Recent regeneration ==
The Kinlochleven Community Trust, a partnership consisting of the local community, (Rio Tinto) Alcan, Lochaber Enterprise, Highland Council and Scottish Natural Heritage, supported by other agencies in Scotland and the European Union and chaired by Highland Councillor Drew McFarlane-Slack led the economic revival of the village. To date environmental improvements, new business pavilions, extensive path works and decontamination works have contributed to growth in the village and surrounding area.

The biggest recent development was a new campus, consisting of Kinlochleven High School, Primary School and Nursery which opened in August 2008. A local library is shared with the school. It has books, local information and computer internet access.

== Churches ==
Within Kinlochleven lies a Salvation Army Hall, The Good Shepherd Catholic Church, Kinlochleven Parish Church of Scotland (now part of the wider South Lochaber Church parish), and St. Paul's Episcopal Church.

== Infrastructure ==
The B863 road runs round the head of Loch Leven through Kinlochleven, connecting to Glencoe to the south-west and North Ballachulish to the north-west. There was no road along the south side of Loch Leven until c. 1918.

Kinlochleven was never connected to the railway network, however the station in nearby South Ballachulish was renamed in 1908 as Ballachulish (Glencoe) for Kinlochleven.

A pier was constructed on the southern shore of Loch Leven for the construction of the hydroelectric scheme and aluminium smelter. A narrow-gauge railway approximately one mile (1.5 kilometres) long linked the pier and the smelter.

== Wildlife ==
The Kinlochleven area is home to many protected species, including tawny owls, barn owls, European pine martens, pipistrelle bats and otters. A hybrid wildcat was captured on film in 2018. White-tailed eagles are regularly seen, while stags regularly walk through the village. Golden eagles have been seen in the mountains surrounding the village.
