= 2003 World Mountain Running Trophy =

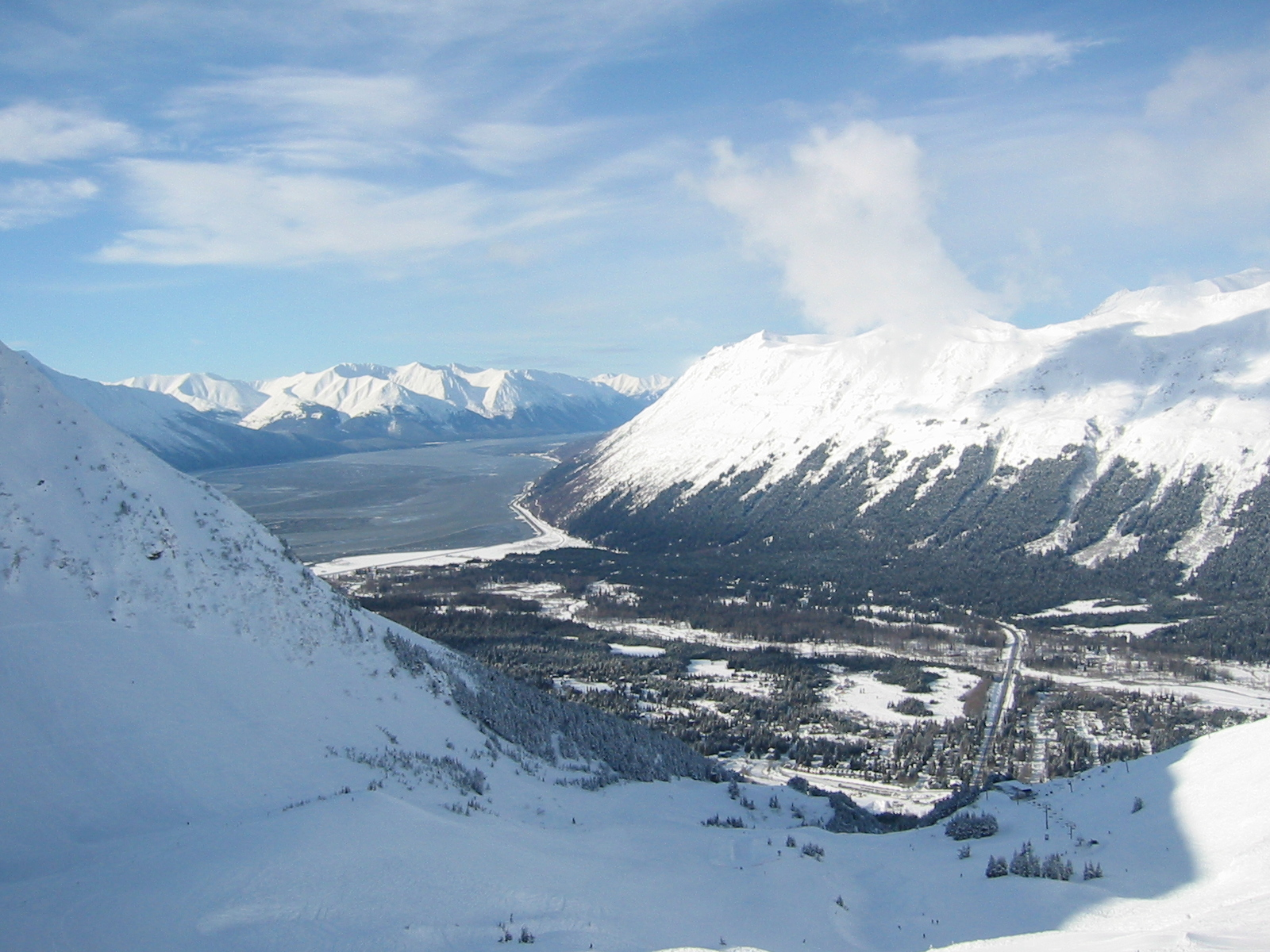
- Girdwood Valley
- Organisers: WMRA
- Edition: 19th
- Dates: 21 September
- Host city: Girdwood, United States
- Level: Senior and Junior
- Events: 8

The 2003 World Mountain Running Championships was the 19th edition of the global mountain running competition, World Mountain Running Championships, organised by the World Mountain Running Association.

== Results ==
=== Men Senior ===
Distance 11.48 km, difference in height 900 m, participants 115.

Individual

Rank	Runner	Country	Time
1st place, gold medalist(s)	Marco De Gasperi	Italy	50:29
2nd place, silver medalist(s)	Florian Heinzle	Austria	51:16
3rd place, bronze medalist(s)	Marco Gaiardo	Italy	51:55
4	Andrew Jones	England	52:10
5	Tim Davies	Wales	52:46
6	Alexis Gex-Fabry	Switzerland	53:03
7	Emanuele Manzi	Italy	53:05
8	Helmut Schiessl	Germany	53:19
9	Ricardo Mejía	Mexico	53:35
10	Sebastien Epiney	Switzerland	53:42

Team

Rank	Team	Athletes	Points
1st place, gold medalist(s)	Italy	Marco De Gasperi, Marco Gaiardo, Emanuele Manzi, Claudio Cassi, Alessio Rinaldi, Marco Agostini	24
2nd place, silver medalist(s)	England	Andrew Jones, Simon Bailey, Lloyd Taggart, Simon Booth, Andrew Symonds, Mark Roberts	48
3rd place, bronze medalist(s)	Germany	Helmut Schiessl, Markus Jenne, Timo Zeiler, Max Frei	67

=== Women Senior ===
Distance 7.7 km, difference in height 600 m, participants 65.

Individual

Rank	Runner	Country	Time
1st place, gold medalist(s)	Melissa Moon	New Zealand	39:02
2nd place, silver medalist(s)	Angela Mudge	Scotland	39:41
3rd place, bronze medalist(s)	Tracey Brindley	Scotland	39:59
4	Antonella Confortola	Italy	40:27
5	Izabela Zatorska	Poland	40:54
6	Sylvie Claus	France	40:56
7	Andrea Mayr	Austria	41:02
8	Anita Ortiz	United States	42:33
9	Patricia Farget	France	42:41
10	Anna Pichrtova	Czech Republic	43:03

Team

Rank	Team	Athletes	Points
1st place, gold medalist(s)	Scotland	Angela Mudge, Tracey Brindley, Lyn Wilson	23
2nd place, silver medalist(s)	France	Sylvie Claus, Patricia Farget, Isabelle Guillot, Isabelle Grenier	29
3rd place, bronze medalist(s)	Austria	Andrea Mayr, Cornelia Heinzle, Sandra Baumann, Patrizia Rausch	34

=== Junior Men ===
Distance 7.7 km, difference in height 600 m, participants 55.

Individual

Rank	Runner	Country	Time
1st place, gold medalist(s)	Mitja Kosovelj	Slovenia	35:41
2nd place, silver medalist(s)	Peter Lamovec	Slovenia	36:01
3rd place, bronze medalist(s)	Sedat Gunen	Turkey	36:06
4	Iain Donnan	Scotland	36:44
5	Alexis Traub	France	37:10
6	Matthew Prosser	New Zealand	37:34
7	Radoslaw Kleczek	Poland	37:45
8	Antonio Toninelli	Italy	37:56
9	Ruggero Ghezzi	Italy	38:01
10	Nicola Spada	Italy	38:06

Team

Rank	Team	Athletes	Points
1st place, gold medalist(s)	Slovenia	Mitja Kosovelj, Peter Lamovec, Uros Tomec, Andrej Cimpersek	23
2nd place, silver medalist(s)	Italy	Antonio Toninelli, Ruggero Ghezzi, Nicola Spada, Luca Orlandi	27
3rd place, bronze medalist(s)	Turkey	Sedat Gunen, Adem Pekdogan, Hamdullah Gul, Erdal Bulut	49

=== Junior Women ===
Distance 4.2 km, difference in height 285 m, participants 32.

Individual

Rank	Runner	Country	Time
1st place, gold medalist(s)	Karrissa Hawitt	England	17:24
2nd place, silver medalist(s)	Turkan Bozkurt	Turkey	17:48
3rd place, bronze medalist(s)	Mateja Kosovelj	Slovenia	18:00
4	Lucija Krkoc	Slovenia	18:09
5	Natalia Nemkina	Russia	18:23
6	Lisa Reisinger	Germany	18:31
7	Juliane Doll	Germany	18:42
8	Rachael Thompson	England	18:50
9	Dominika Wisniewska	Poland	18:53
10	Iwona Bota	Poland	18:54

Team

Rank	Team	Athletes	Points
1st place, gold medalist(s)	Slovenia	Mateja Kosovelj, Lucija Krkoc, Suza Mladenovic	7
2nd place, silver medalist(s)	England	Karrissa Hawitt, Rachael Thompson, Katie Ingram	9
3rd place, bronze medalist(s)	Germany	Lisa Reisinger, Juliane Doll	13

== Medal table (junior events included) ==
Rank	Country	1st place, gold medalist(s)	2nd place, silver medalist(s)	3rd place, bronze medalist(s)	Tot.
1	Italy	3	1	0	4
2	New Zealand	2	1	1	4
3	Eritrea	1	1	0	2
3	France	1	1	0	2
5	Scotland	1	0	0	1
6	Austria	0	3	0	3
7	Germany	0	1	2	3
8	Poland	0	0	2	2
8	Switzerland	0	0	2	2
10	Czech Republic	0	0	1	1
