= Snowdon Race =

Endurance running competition in Wales

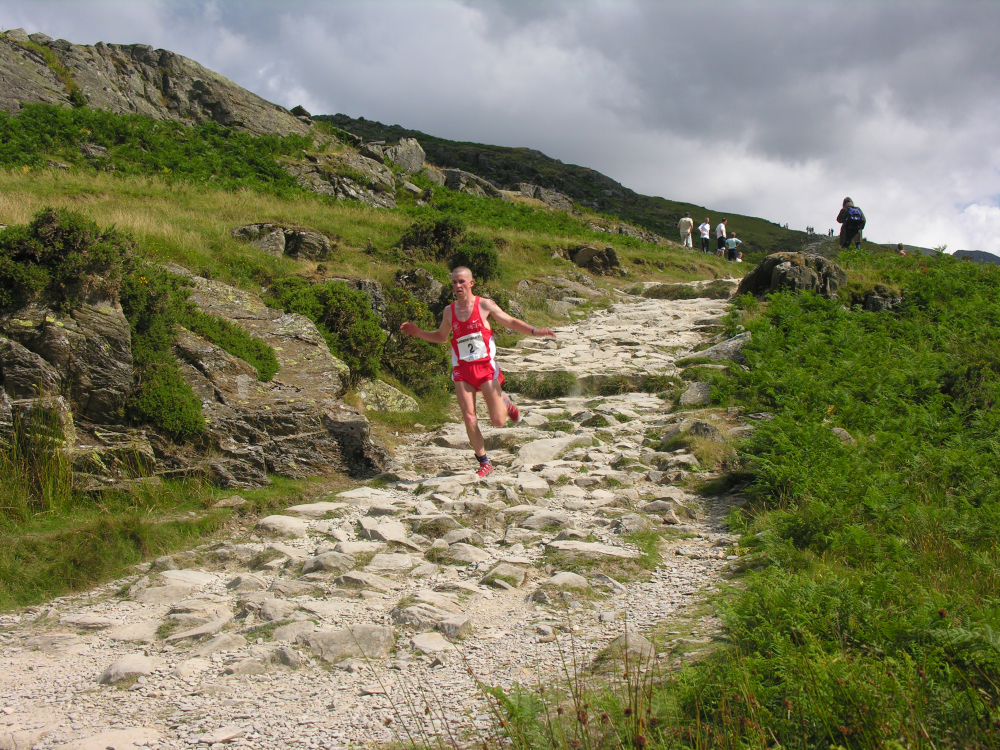
- Tim Davies during his 2005 victory
- Date: July
- Location: Llanberis, Wales
- Event type: Mountain
- Distance: c. 10 miles
- Established: 1976
- Course records: 1:02:29 (Kenny Stuart, 1985); 1:12:48 (Carol Greenwood, 1993)
- Website: snowdonrace.co.uk

The Snowdon Race (Welsh: Ras Yr Wyddfa) is a ten-mile endurance running competition in Gwynedd, from Llanberis to the peak of Snowdon. Contestants must make the five miles up the Llanberis Path to the summit (1,085 metres or 3,560 feet above sea level) and return down. Currently entrants must be over-18 to compete in either the men's or women's race. In 2009 a junior race was incorporated.

The race was first held in 1976 when Ken Jones from Llanberis put forward the idea to the village's Carnival Committee. 86 runners took part in the first race. In 2010, nearly 500 runners competed, with the nations represented including Scotland, Italy and Kenya.

The men's course record stands at 1:02:29, set by Kenny Stuart in 1985. It was during this same race that the record time for just an ascent was set by Robin Bryson, who reached the summit in 39 minutes and 47 seconds, ten seconds ahead of Stuart. The women's course record stands at 1:12:48, set by Carol Greenwood in 1993.

Radio Cymru broadcasts live from the event, and S4C produces a television highlights programme showing profiles on individual racers.

In 1996, the course was used for the European Mountain Running Trophy, run on the same weekend but separately from the annual Snowdon Race. Frenchman Jaime Dejesus-Mendes was the winner of the men's race in 1:03:16. The women ran a shorter course, with Isabelle Guillot finishing first in 53:09.

In 2001, the race was part of the World Mountain Running Association Grand Prix.

== Results ==
Year	First place man	Time	Second place man	Time	Third place man	Time	First place woman	Time	Second place woman	Time	Third place woman	Time
1976	(England) Dave Francis	1:12:05	(Wales) Tacwyn Davies	1:13:31	(England) Ray Rawlinson	1:14:38	(Wales) Bridget Hogge	1:40:15	missing data	--	missing data	--
1977	(England) Ricky Wilde	1:06:07	(England) Jeff Norman	1:07:34	(England) Mike Short	1:08:42	(Wales) Joan Glass	1:39:46	missing data	--	missing data	--
1978	(England) Ricky Wilde	1:04:28	(England) Dave Francis	1:07:25	(England) Jeff Norman	1:07:53	(Wales) Joan Glass	1:31:24	missing data	--	missing data	--
1979	(England) Jeff Norman	1:05:00	(England) Ricky Wilde	1:07:07	(England) Dave Francis	1:07:11	(Wales) Joan Glass	1:29:02	missing data	--	missing data	--
1980	(Italy) Privato Pezzoli	1:06:53	(Wales) Andy Darby	1:08:43	A. Giupponi	1:09:07	(England) Pauline Haworth	1:25:18	missing data	--	missing data	--
1981	(England) John Wild	1:05:18	(Italy) Gianni Rovedatti	1:05:31	S. Lazzaroni	1:08:08	(Scotland) Ros Coats	1:24:49	missing data	--	missing data	--
1982	(England) John Wild	1:05:55	(Italy) Privato Pezzoli	1:06:36	(Italy) Fausto Bonzi	1:06:41	(Wales) Rosie Naish	1:24:10	missing data	--	missing data	--
1983	R. Keeney	1:08:39	M. Bishop	1:09:23	(England) Jeff Norman	1:09:55	(Wales) Bridget Hogge	1:39:32	missing data	--	missing data	--
1984	(Italy) Fausto Bonzi	1:03:46		1:		1:	(England) Pauline Haworth	1:24:03	missing data	--	missing data	--
1985	(England) Kenny Stuart	1:02:29		1:		1:	(England) Pauline Haworth	1:20:29	missing data	--	missing data	--
1986	(Italy) Luigi Bortoluzzi	1:04:24		1:		1:	(England) Carol Haigh	1:14:36	missing data	--	missing data	--
1987	(Switzerland) Martin May	1:03:43		1:		1:	(Wales) Angela Carson	1:24:19	missing data	--	missing data	--
1988	(Scotland) Colin Donnelly	1:04:38		1:		1:	(England) Sue Dilnot	1:22:10	missing data	--	missing data	--
1989	(Republic of Ireland) John Lenihan	1:04:12	(England) Malcolm Patterson	1:04:50	(Switzerland) M May	1:05:00	(Wales) Angela Carson	1:22:38	missing data	--	missing data	--
1990	(Italy) Lucio Fregona	1:03:43		1:		1:	(Scotland) Tricia Calder	1:17:25	missing data	--	missing data	--
1991	(England) Mark Croasdale	1:04:48		1:		1:	(England) Anne Buckley	1:19:35	missing data	--	missing data	--
1992	(England) Mark Croasdale	1:05:09		1:		1:	(Scotland) Tricia Calder	1:18:37	missing data	--	missing data	--
1993	(England) Ian Holmes	1:04:14		1:		1:	(England) Carol Greenwood	1:12:48	missing data	--	missing data	--
1994	(Italy) Fabio Ciaponi	1:04:44		1:		1:	(England) Lucy Wright	1:22:35	missing data	--	missing data	--
1995	(England) Mark Kinch	1:02:58		1:		1:	(Northern Ireland) Patricia Sloan	1:22:33	missing data	--	missing data	--
1996	(England) Martin Roscoe	1:07:18		1:		1:	(England) Lesley Leavesley	1:26:56	missing data	--	missing data	--
1997	(England) Ian Holmes	1:04:50		1:		1:	(England) Carol Greenwood	1:16:11	missing data	--	missing data	--
1998	(Wales) Colin Jones	1:05:14		1:		1:	(Scotland) Angela Mudge	1:16:14	missing data	--	missing data	--
1999	(England) Neil Wilkinson	1:05:51		1:		1:	(England) Helen Jackson	1:25:12	missing data	--	missing data	--
2000	(England) Neil Wilkinson	1:05:45	(Italy) Fabio Ciaponi	1:07:24	(England) Ian Holmes	1:07:48	(Scotland) Angela Mudge	1:20:28	missing data	--	missing data	--
2001	(Italy) Marco De Gasperi	1:05:51	(Italy) Emanuele Manzi	1:	(England) John Taylor	1:	(Poland) Izabela Zatorska	1:19:04	missing data	--	missing data	--
2002	(Wales) Tim Davies	1:07:11	(England) Ian Holmes	1:08:13	(Italy) Fabrizio Triulzi	1:08:21	(Scotland) Tracey Brindley	1:20:37	missing data	--	missing data	--
2003	(Wales) Tim Davies	1:05:57	(England) Simon Bailey	1:06:41	(England) Ian Holmes	1:07:11	(Scotland) Dawn Scott	1:25:40	missing data	--	missing data	--
2004	(England) Ian Holmes	1:05:38	(France) Julien Rancon	1:06:04	(Wales) Alun Vaughn	1:06:12	(Scotland) Claire Whitehead	1:18:28	missing data	--	missing data	--
2005	(Wales) Tim Davies	1:06:37	(England) William Levett	1:07:20	(Italy) Alessio Rinaldi	1:08:24	(England) Mary Wilkinson	1:17:44	missing data	--	missing data	--
2006	(England) Andi Jones	1:07:25	(Wales) Tim Davies	1:07:57	(England) Ian Holmes	1:09:10	(England) Mary Wilkinson	1:19:38	missing data	--	missing data	--
2007	(England) Andi Jones	1:05:38	(England) Ian Holmes	1:08:16	(England) Ben Bardsley	1:08:26	(England) Mary Wilkinson	1:20:36	missing data	--	missing data	--
2008	(England) Andi Jones	1:06:02	(England) Morgan Donnelly	1:09:24	(England) Ian Holmes	1:10:37	(England) Katie Ingram	1:20:44	missing data	--	missing data	--
2009	(England) Andi Jones	1:08:15	(England) Ian Holmes	1:09:00	(Scotland) Murray Strain	1:09:43	(England) Katie Ingram	1:15:34	(England) Philippa Jackson	1:23:10	(England) Emma Clayton	1:25:38
2010	(Scotland) Robbie Simpson	1:07:59	(Italy) Alex Baldaccini	1:09:11	(England) Ian Holmes	1:09:11	(Scotland) Catriona Buchanan	1:21:19	(England) Pippa Jackson	1:21:54	(England) ~~Lauren Jeska~~*	~~1:24:33~~
2011	(England) Andi Jones	1:05:57	(Scotland) Murray Strain	1:06:03	(Scotland) Robbie Simpson	1:07:36	(England) Pippa Maddams	1:20:53	(Scotland) Catriona Buchanan	1:22:12	(Scotland) Christina Rankin	1:22:42
2012	(Scotland) Murray Strain	1:05:10	(Scotland) Robbie Simpson	1:06:43	(Italy) Fabio Ruga	1:07:25	(England) Tessa Hill	1:21:26	(England) Helen Fines	1:23:09	(England) Katie Walshaw	1:24:22
2013	(England) Andi Jones	1:08:50	(Scotland) Murray Strain	1:10:14	(England) Rob Hope	1:10:54	(Republic of Ireland) Sarah Mulligan	1:26:25	(Scotland) Jill Mykura	1:27:14	(Wales) Jackie Lee	1:27:51
2014	(Italy) Cesare Maestri	0:47:20	(Italy) Erik Rosaire	0:47:43	(Republic of Ireland) Tim O'Donoghue	0:47:51	(Republic of Ireland) Sarah McCormack	0:55:21	(Scotland) Tessa Hill	0:57:56	(Italy) Elisa Compagnoni	0:58:04
2015	(Italy) Emanuele Manzi	1:10:18	(Italy) Massimo Farcoz	1:11:29	(England) Ben Mounsey	1:11:39	(Republic of Ireland) Sarah McCormack	1:20:56	(England) Lindsey Brindle	1:24:13	(England) Katie Walshaw	1:25:14
2016	(England) Chris Smith	1:05:48	(England) Chris Farrell	1:07:14	(Italy) Luca Cagnati	1:07:17	(Republic of Ireland) Sarah Mulligan	1:20:52	(England) Heidi Dent	1:21:11	(Scotland) Stephanie Provan	1:23:54
2017	(Italy) Davide Magnini	1:06:42	(England) Chris Farrell	1:07:46	(England) Tom Adams	1:09:16	(England) Annie Conway	1:20:15	(Scotland) Louise Mercer	1:22:30	(England) Katie White	1:23:03
2018	(Italy) Alberto Vender	1:06:41	(England) Chris Holdsworth	1:07:30	(Wales) Rob Samuel	1:07:53	(Wales) Bronwen Jenkinson	1:20:41	(Scotland) Miranda Grant	1:22:20	(England) Sophie Noon	1:23:42
2019	(Scotland) Andy Douglas	1:04:04	(Italy) Martin Dematteis	1:06:33	(Italy) Bernard Dematteis	1:07:06	(Republic of Ireland) Sarah McCormack	1:14:49	(Italy) Elisa Sortini	1:15:11	(England) Hatti Archer	1:17:17
2020	Cancelled due to the COVID-19 pandemic											
2021	Cancelled due to the COVID-19 pandemic											
2022	(Scotland) Ross Gollan	1:09:21	(Italy) Luca Merli	1:10:04	(England) Nathan Edmondson	1:10:19	(England) Hannah Russell	1:18:48	(England) Sara Willhoit	1:19:12	(Scotland) Holly Page	1:19:27
2023	(Italy) Isacco Costa	38:59	(England) Chris Richards	39:05	(Scotland) Andy Douglas	39:33	(Scotland) Holly Page	46:01	(England) Phillipa Williams	46:25	(England) Caroline Lambert	47:18
2024	(England) Joe Steward	1:05:41	(Italy) Lorenzo Cagnati	1:08:13	(England) Grant Cunliffe	1:08:22	(Scotland) Naomi Lang	1:15:48	(England) Eve Pannone	1:18:28	(Italy) Beatrice Bianchi	1:18:32
2025	(Italy) Luca Magri	1:06:11	(Italy) Michael Galassi	1:06:58	(Italy) Roberto Giacomotti	1:07:39	(England) Nancy Scott	1:20:31	(Italy) Beatrice Bianchi	1:21:58	(England) Eve Pannone	1:22:13
2026	(Italy) Massimiliano Berti	1:04:12	(Italy) Tiziano Moia	1:05:46	(Italy) Giulio Simonetti	1:07:14	(Scotland) Emily McNicol	1:16:55	(England) Hannah Russell	1:17:37	(Italy) Luna Giovanetti	1:18:17

- All Jeska's athletics results were declared null and void when she failed to produce samples of her testosterone levels.
