= 1999 World Mountain Running Trophy =

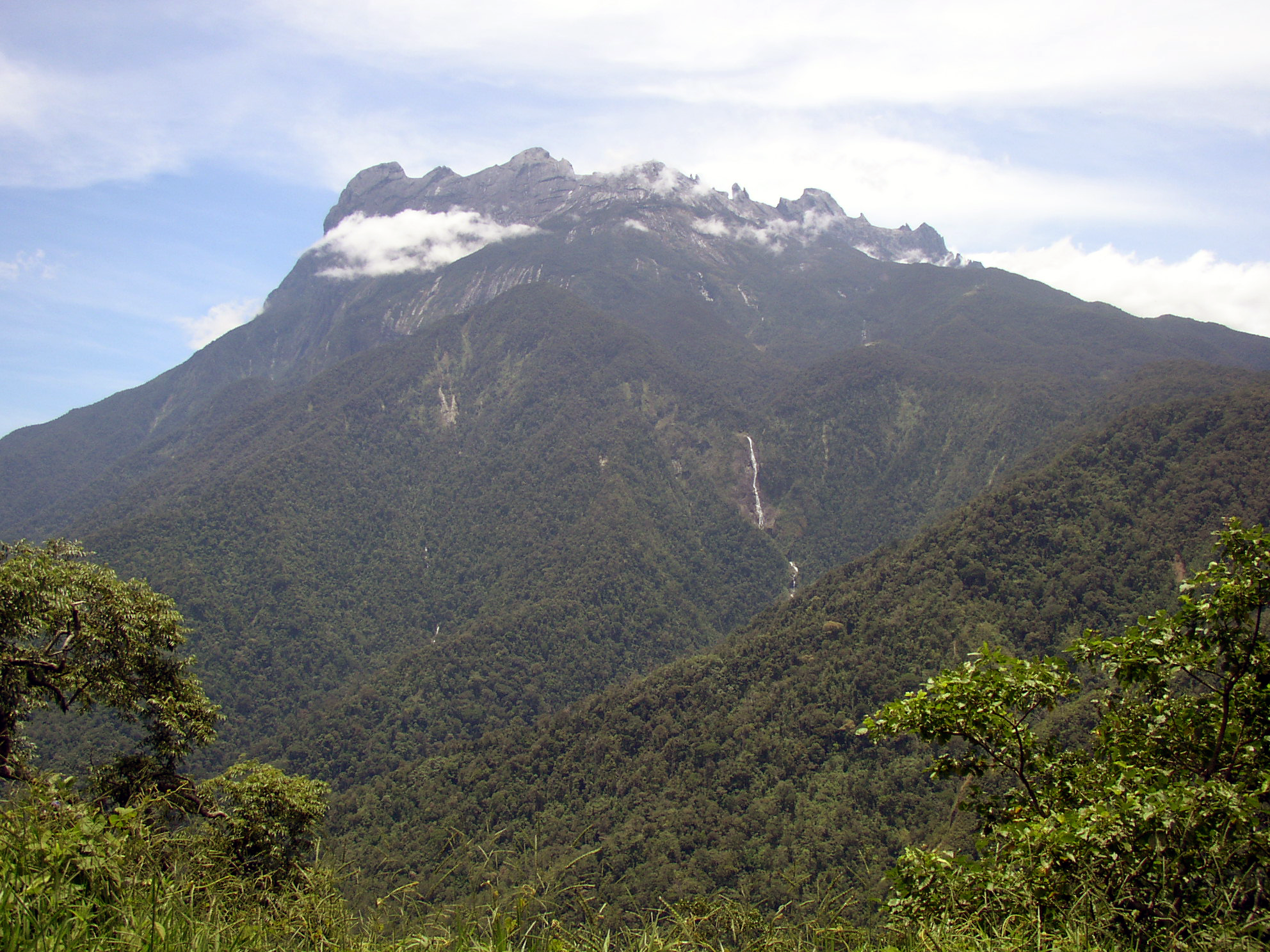
- Mount Kinabalu landscape.
- Organisers: WMRA
- Edition: 15th
- Dates: 19 September
- Host city: Kinabalu Park, Malaysia
- Level: Senior and Junior
- Events: 8

The 1999 World Mountain Running Championships was the 15th edition of the global mountain running competition, World Mountain Running Championships, organised by the World Mountain Running Association.

== Results ==
=== Men Senior ===
Distance 12.5 km, difference in height 860 m, participants 99.

Individual

Rank	Runner	Country	Time
1st place, gold medalist(s)	Marco De Gasperi	Italy	54:56
2nd place, silver medalist(s)	Richard Findlow	England	56:17
3rd place, bronze medalist(s)	Gino Caneva	Italy	56:21
4	Billy Burns	England	56:23
5	Scott Gall	United States	56:42
6	Lucio Fregona	Italy	56:56
7	Jonathan Wyatt	New Zealand	57:04
8	Aaron Strong	New Zealand	57:10
9	Robert Quinn	Scotland	57:13
10	Regis Roux	France	57:28

Team

Rank	Team	Athletes	Points
1st place, gold medalist(s)	Italy	Marco De Gasperi, Gino Caneva, Lucio Fregona, Antonio Molinari, Simone Lenzi	23
2nd place, silver medalist(s)	France	Regis Roux, Thierry Icart, Thierry Breuil, Arnaud Fourdin, Giles Icart, Raymond Fontaine	51
3rd place, bronze medalist(s)	New Zealand	Jonathan Wyatt, Aaron Strong, Philip Starr, Wayne Atkins, Simon Maunder, Paul Morrow	74

=== Men Junior ===
Distance 7.8 km, difference in height 510 m, participants 53.

Individual

Rank	Runner	Country	Time
1st place, gold medalist(s)	Beniamino Lubrini	Italy	35:51
2nd place, silver medalist(s)	Florian Heinzle	Austria	36:07
3rd place, bronze medalist(s)	Jason Woolhouse	New Zealand	36:15
4	Ben Ruthe	New Zealand	36:33
5	Simon Bailey	England	36:36
6	Emmanuel Meyssat	France	36:51
7	Johnny Cattaneo	Italy	36:56
8	Raphael Ivan Bizet	France	37:00
9	Julien Rancon	France	37:08
10	Pavel Dobsicek	Czech Republic	37:12

Team

Rank	Team	Athletes	Points
1st place, gold medalist(s)	Italy	Beniamino Lubrini, Johnny Cattaneo, Matteo Massi, Alesandro Tonazzi	21
2nd place, silver medalist(s)	France	Emmanuel Meyssat, Raphael Ivan Bizet, Julien Rancon, Nicolas Collias	23
3rd place, bronze medalist(s)	Austria	Florian Heinzle, Florian Duerer, Thomas Heigl, Markus Hohenwarter	28

=== Women Senior ===
Distance 7.8 km, difference in height 510 m, participants 66.

Individual

Rank	Runner	Country	Time
1st place, gold medalist(s)	Rosita Rota Gelpi	Italy	38:00
2nd place, silver medalist(s)	Izabela Zatorska	Poland	38:41
3rd place, bronze medalist(s)	Maree Bunce	New Zealand	39:11
4	Flavia Gaviglio	Italy	39:48
5	Pierangela Baronchelli	Italy	39:58
6	Melissa Moon	New Zealand	40:46
7	Angela Mudge	Scotland	40:49
8	Karen Murphy	New Zealand	40:52
9	Isabelle Guillot	France	41:03
10	Tracey Brindley	Scotland	41:05

Team

Rank	Team	Athletes	Points
1st place, gold medalist(s)	Italy	Rosita Rota Gelpi, Flavia Gaviglio, Pierangela Baronchelli, Maria Grazia Roberti	10
2nd place, silver medalist(s)	New Zealand	Maree Bunce, Melissa Moon, Karen Murphy, Megan Edhouse	17
3rd place, bronze medalist(s)	Scotland	Angela Mudge, Tracey Brindley, Trudi Thomson, Sonia Armitage	39

=== Women Junior ===
Distance 4.1 km, difference in height 320 m, participants 33.

Individual

Rank	Runner	Country	Time
1st place, gold medalist(s)	Cornelia Heinzle	Austria	23:47
2nd place, silver medalist(s)	Ines Hizar	Slovenia	24:17
3rd place, bronze medalist(s)	Kate Bailey	England	24:21
4	Valentina Belotti	Italy	24:30
5	Wanti Shinta	Indonesia	24:58
6	Tina Hizar	Slovenia	25:01
7	Lara Huges	England	25:07
8	Murrihy Demezza	New Zealand	24:34
9	Svetlana Bajic	Scotland	25:48
10	Emilia Krawczyk	Poland	25:52

Team

Rank	Team	Athletes	Points
1st place, gold medalist(s)	Slovenia	Ines Hizar, Tina Hizar, Svetlana Bajic	8
2nd place, silver medalist(s)	England	Kate Bailey, Lara Huges, Louise Kelly	10
3rd place, bronze medalist(s)	Italy	Valentina Belotti, Erika Teani, Rosella Cravetto	18

== Medal table ==
Rank	Country	1st place, gold medalist(s)	2nd place, silver medalist(s)	3rd place, bronze medalist(s)	Tot.
1	Italy	6	0	2	8
2	Austria	1	1	1	3
3	Slovenia	1	1	0	2
4	England	0	2	1	3
5	France	0	2	0	2
6	New Zealand	0	1	3	4
7	England	0	1	1	2
8	Poland	0	1	0	1
9	Scotland	0	0	1	1
