= Angela Mudge =

Scottish hill runner and skyrunner (born 1970)

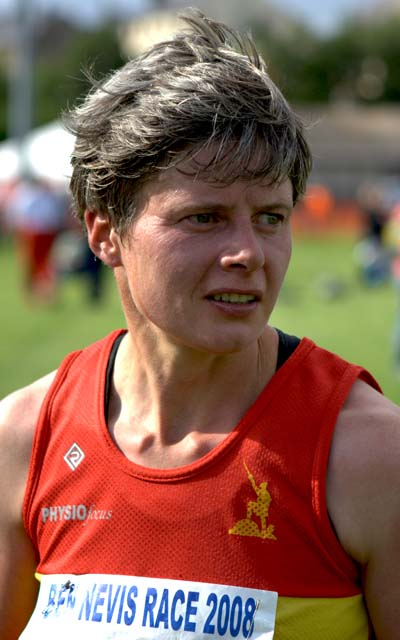
- Angela Mudge, photographed after winning the 2008 Ben Nevis Race, part of the Skyrunner World Series

Personal information
- Born: 8 July 1970 (age 56) Tavistock, Devon, England, UK
- Website: angelamudge.co.uk

Sport
- Sport: Skyrunning, Fell running
Medal record
Skyrunning
World Championships
Bronze medal – third place	2010 Canazei	Vertical km
Ultra running
World Trail Championships
Silver medal – second place	2009 Briançon	68 km trail
Commonwealth Championships
Silver medal – second place	2011 Llandudno	55 km trail
Silver medal – second place	2011 Llandudno	Team
Mountain running
World Championships
Gold medal – first place	2000 Bergen	Individual
Gold medal – first place	2003 Girdwood	Team
Silver medal – second place	2003 Girdwood	Individual
Silver medal – second place	2005 Wellington	Team
Bronze medal – third place	1999 Sabah	Team
European Championships
Silver medal – second place	1999 Carinthia	Individual
Silver medal – second place	2001 Cerklje	Individual
Silver medal – second place	2003 Trento	Individual
Bronze medal – third place	2002 Madeira	Team
Bronze medal – third place	2003 Trento	Team
Commonwealth Championships
Silver medal – second place	2009 Keswick	Team overall
Bronze medal – third place	2009 Keswick	Team uphill
World Masters Championships
Gold medal – first place	2005 Keswick	Over 35's
Gold medal – first place	2010 Korbielow	Over 40's

Angela Mudge (born 8 July 1970) is a Scottish champion hill runner and skyrunner. Despite being born with birth defects in both legs, and finding track athletics not to her liking, she discovered her sport while a postgraduate student in Scotland in the mid-1990s, and developed rapidly.

She has won the Scottish Hill Running Championships three times (1997, 1998, 2006), the British Fell Running Championships five times (1997–2000, 2008), and holds the women's record on more than thirteen courses in Scotland alone. On the international stage she won the Women's World Mountain Running Trophy in 2000, the World Masters Mountain Running Championships in 2005, and the Buff Skyrunner World Series in 2006 and 2007. She was named on a list of "100 things we still love about sport" by The Observer newspaper in June 2008.

== Early years ==
Mudge's start in life did not augur well for a future in endurance running, after she was born with pedal defects; both of Angela's feet and one of her twin sister Janice's were pointing backwards. She has commented that "[w]e got a bit squashed in the womb", and for the first few years of their lives both girls were required to have their legs in braces and plaster to rectify this.

When she was a teenager she raced on the track, but gave it up out of dissatisfaction with "running in circles". Even cross-country courses were insufficiently challenging, and it was only following her graduation from the University of Leicester with a BSc in chemistry, when she moved north to the University of Stirling to obtain her master's degree, that she discovered hill running and began to fulfil her potential. When she subsequently moved to the University of Edinburgh to study for her PhD, she joined the Carnethy Hill Running Club, where she remains an active member and competitor. She obtained her doctorate in 2000.

Although born and raised in Devon, Mudge has only ever represented Scotland at international level, commenting that "[i]t would've been tough to have gone back down south and tried to gain selection there. Once I started running for Scotland there seemed no point in changing because they gave me my opportunity."

== National and international career ==
Mudge came late to hill running by comparison with more mainstream athletics competitors, not recording results until her mid-twenties, but developed quickly thereafter. Placed only 49th in the British Fell Running Championship in 1995, she won the event four times in succession from 1997 to 2000. In between times, she scored a fourth-place finish in the 1997 European Mountain Running Trophy, and also won the Scottish Hill Running Championships in 1997 and 1998, and the Scottish Cross Country Championship in 1999. She showed equally rapid development on the international stage, placing 46th in the 11th World Mountain Running Trophy when it was held in Scotland in 1995, five years prior to winning the event outright in 2000.

She continued her international success in 1999, the year she broke the course record for the prestigious 4,100 metres (13,500 ft) Mount Kinabalu Climbathon in Sabah, Malaysia, as she won the race and the US$2,500 prize. Mudge also triumphed in similar record-breaking style in the 2001 Cinq 4,000s in Sierre-Zinal, Switzerland, becoming the first woman to achieve a sub-three-hour time on the 31 kilometres (19 mi) course.

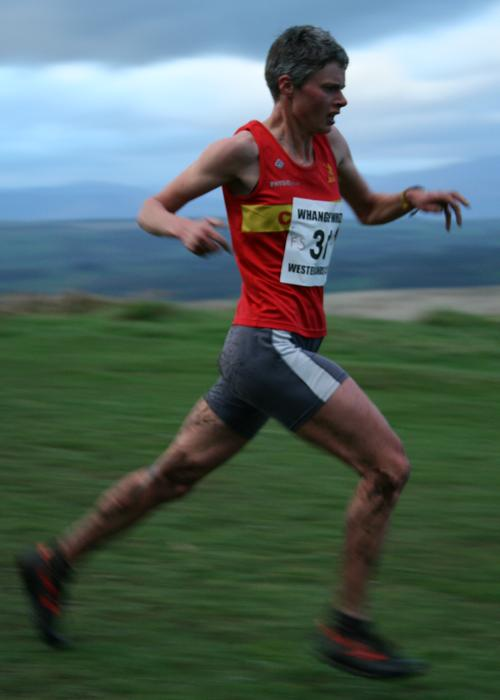
Angela Mudge, competing at the 2007 "Whangie Whizz" race in Scotland, when she set a course record for women. She is wearing her usual colours, a red shirt with yellow horizontal band, representing Carnethy Running Club.

In the European Mountain Running Trophy, her best results have been as runner up in Bad Kleinkirchheim, Carinthia, Austria in 1999, which she repeated in 2001 in Slovenia, finishing behind Russian Svetlana Demidenko, and again in 2003 in Trento, Italy, when Belgium's Catherine Lallemand won. She won the women's World Mountain Running Trophy in Bergen, Germany against expectations in 2000; as with all even-numbered years, the Trophy race followed the international style, which typically only involves an ascent. Mudge is more experienced in British fell-running, which includes running up and down hills, but found success despite being unable to exploit her greater descending experience. Mudge herself described the WMRT win as "the pinnacle of my career" in a June 2008 interview.

Following her World Mountain Running Trophy win, she was one of only five Britons nominated at the 2001 Laureus World Sports Awards, alongside footballer David Beckham, rower Steve Redgrave, triple jumper Jonathan Edwards and boxer Lennox Lewis. However, she was unable to attend the ceremony at the Royal Albert Hall in London because she had already booked a long-planned holiday to the Antipodes and, she claimed, "...didn't possess a little black dress, and would only have wandered around collecting autographs."

She finished second behind New Zealand's Melissa Moon in the 2003 World Mountain Running Trophy, held in Girdwood, Alaska. Compatriots Tracey Brindley finished third and Lyn Wilson eighteenth, and these combined results meant Scotland won the Women's Team championship. She also won the 2003 Pikes Peak Marathon, which she only entered as a warm up for the Alaska race. Her victory in 4h 19m 38s not only set an age-group record for the 4,300 metres (14,100 ft) peak, it marked the only defeat in six years for Los Alamos, New Mexico runner Erica Larson, the most successful woman in the event's history.

== 2005 injuries ==
Mudge missed much of the 2005 season, first recuperating from an operation to rehabilitate a damaged knee which left her on crutches, and then succumbing to a bout of plantar fasciitis between May and July. Of her surgery, Mudge said: "I'd worn away all my knee cartilage – more to do with my running style than the sport itself. I was running on the bare bone of my femur, so the surgeon drilled a lot of holes, which stimulates scar tissue, and eventually, I could run again. My knee was more painful afterwards than before. I was prepared for that, but was allowed to run for only ten minutes even months after the operation. I deliberately did not ask about the success or failure rate in order to keep a positive frame of mind. It was only six months later that a physiotherapist told me there were lots of people for whom the operation did not work."

On her return from injury, she won three races in Switzerland and placed second in their National Championship. Her prizes included a large raclette cheese and a CHF50 voucher for a local florist. She had to decline the latter, as she had no place for a vase of flowers—she lives in a tent when touring the circuit, cooking over a gas stove and travelling to events by bicycle.

Although she missed most of the summer, she recovered sufficiently to win the fifth World Masters Mountain Running Championships in England's Lake District in September.

== Skyrunning ==
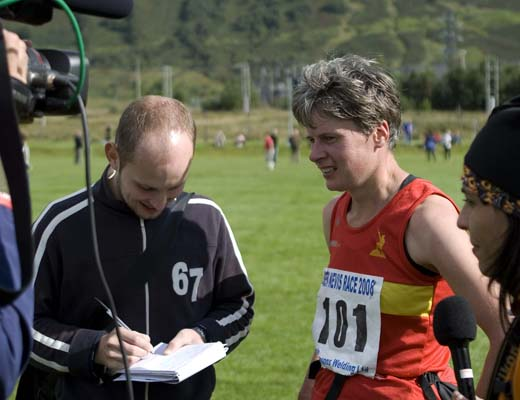
Angela Mudge participating in post-race interviews following her victory in the 2008 Ben Nevis Race

For 2006 Mudge became a member of the Team SaabSalomon Adventure Running Team, and competed in the Buff Skyrunner World Series, a grand prix of eight high altitude endurance races around the globe. She did not participate in the opening race in Hidalgo, Mexico, but was victorious in four successive subsequent rounds in Zegama, Spain, Valposchiavo, Switzerland, Nagano, Japan, and Canazei, the Dolomites, Italy, breaking the course record on each occasion. She missed two subsequent events following the loss of her twin sister to cancer, but her third place in the 20th Mount Kinabalu Climbathon in Malaysia in the final event of the season ensured she won the Series overall, along with the €3000 prize. She also regained her Scottish Hill Running Championship title in 2006, winning all four of the events she entered.

Team SaabSalomon retained Mudge's services for the 2007 Skyrunner Series, and she subsequently won the first three races in which she competed, in Berga, Berguedà, in the Catalan region of Spain, Vallnord in Andorra, and the Dolomites in Italy. A second-place finish in the Zegama-Aizkorri Alpine Marathon was enough to see her retain her title in 2007.

After her skyrunning success, Mudge travelled to Nepal in November 2007 to participate in the twelfth Everest Marathon, the world's highest marathon which starts only two hours from Everest Base Camp, at an altitude of 5,200 metres (17,100 ft). She finished eighth overall, the first woman and the second westerner out of 80 participants, setting a course record of 5h 3m, thirteen minutes ahead of the previous mark.

She was an occasional competitor in the 2008 series, winning in Valposchiavo, Switzerland, and her home event in Fort William, Scotland. She also finished second in the other two races she entered, the WMRA Grand Prix in Saillon-Ovronaz, Switzerland, and the Sky Marathon de la Grigne in Italy. However, a record-breaking performance by rival Corinne Favre in the latter denied Mudge a third successive championship.

In domestic competition, she became the British Fell Running Champion for the fifth time in 2008, after winning all four races in which she competed.

== Selected results ==
Year	Event		Location	Result
1997	European Mountain Running Trophy	Individual championship	Ebensee, Austria	4th
1997	European Mountain Running Trophy	Team championship	Ebensee, Austria	9th
1997	British Fell Running Championship			1st
1997	Scottish Hill Running Championship			1st
1998	British Fell Running Championship (2)			1st
1998	Scottish Hill Running Championship (2)			1st
1999	European Mountain Running Trophy	Individual championship	Bad Kleinkirchheim, Carinthia, Austria	2nd
1999	European Mountain Running Trophy	Team championship	Bad Kleinkirchheim, Carinthia, Austria	5th
1999	British Fell Running Championship (3)			1st
1999	Inter-Counties Cross Country Championship		Wollaton Park, Nottingham, United Kingdom	1st
1999	World Mountain Running Trophy	Individual championship	Mount Kinabalu, Sabah, Malaysia	7th
1999	World Mountain Running Trophy	Team championship	Mount Kinabalu, Sabah, Malaysia	3rd
1999	Mount Kinabalu Climbathon		Mount Kinabalu, Sabah, Malaysia	1st
2000	European Mountain Running Trophy	Individual championship	Miedzygorze, Poland	5th
2000	European Mountain Running Trophy	Team championship	Miedzygorze, Poland	10th
2000	World Mountain Running Trophy	Individual championship	Bergen, Germany	1st
2000	World Mountain Running Trophy	Team championship	Bergen, Germany	8th
2000	British Fell Running Championship (4)			1st
2001	Cinq 4,000s		Sierre-Zinal, Switzerland	1st
2001	European Mountain Running Trophy	Individual championship	Cerklje, Slovenia	2nd
2001	European Mountain Running Trophy	Team championship	Cerklje, Slovenia	6th
2001	World Mountain Running Trophy	Individual championship	Arta Terme, Italy	5th
2001	World Mountain Running Trophy	Team championship	Arta Terme, Italy	4th
2002	European Mountain Running Trophy	Individual championship	Câmara de Lobos—Madeira, Portugal	5th
2002	European Mountain Running Trophy	Team championship	Câmara de Lobos—Madeira, Portugal	3rd
2002	World Mountain Running Trophy	Individual championship	Innsbruck, Austria	2nd
2002	World Mountain Running Trophy	Team championship	Innsbruck, Austria	8th
2003	European Mountain Running Trophy	Individual championship	Trento, Italy	2nd
2003	European Mountain Running Trophy	Team championship	Trento, Italy	3rd
2003	Pikes Peak marathon		Pikes Peak, Colorado	1st
2003	World Mountain Running Trophy	Individual championship	Girdwood, Alaska	2nd
2003	World Mountain Running Trophy	Team championship	Girdwood, Alaska	1st
2004	Mount Kinabalu Climbathon (2)		Sabah, Malaysia	1st
2004	Scottish Cross Country Championship			3rd
2005	World Mountain Running Trophy	Individual championship	Wellington, New Zealand	20th
2005	World Mountain Running Trophy	Team championship	Wellington, New Zealand	2nd
2005	World Masters Mountain Running Championship		Keswick, Cumbria, England	1st
2006	Buff Skyrunner Series	Zegama-Aizkorri Mendi Maratoia	Zegama, Spain	1st
2006	Buff Skyrunner Series	5^ SkyRace Internaz. Valmalenco/Valposchiavo	Valposchiavo, Switzerland	1st
2006	Buff Skyrunner Series	OSB Mount Ontake SkyRace	Nagano, Japan	1st
2006	Buff Skyrunner Series	Dolomites SkyRace	Canazei, Italy	1st
2006	Buff Skyrunner Series	20th Mount Kinabalu International Climbathon	Sabah, Malaysia	3rd
2006	Buff Skyrunner Series	2006 Female World Championship		1st
2006	Scottish Hill Running Championship (3)			1st
2007	Buff Skyrunner Series	IV Marató de Muntaya de Berga	Berga, Berguedà, Spain	1st
2007	Buff Skyrunner Series	III Sky Race Vallnord	Vallnord, Andorra	1st
2007	Buff Skyrunner Series	Dolomites SkyRace	Canazei, Italy	1st
2007	Buff Skyrunner Series	Maratòn Alpina Zegama-Aizkorri	Zegama, Spain	2nd
2007	Buff Skyrunner Series	2007 Female World Championship (2)		1st
2007	Everest Marathon		Gorak Shep–Namche, Nepal	1st
2008	Buff Skyrunner Series	7^ SkyRace Internaz. Valmalenco/Valposchiavo	Valposchiavo, Switzerland	1st
2008	Buff Skyrunner Series	WMRA Grand Prix	Saillon-Ovronaz, Switzerland	2nd
2008	Buff Skyrunner Series	Ben Nevis Race	Fort William, Scotland	1st
2008	Buff Skyrunner Series	Sky Marathon de la Grigne	Sentiero delle Grigne, Pasturo, Italy	2nd
2008	Buff Skyrunner Series	2008 Female World Championship		2nd
2008	British Fell Running Championship (5)			1st
2009	IAU Trail World Championships		Serre Chevalier, France	2nd
2009	Commonwealth Mountain and Ultra Distance Running Championships	Uphill race	Keswick, Cumbria, England	7th
2009	Commonwealth Mountain and Ultra Distance Running Championships	Uphill team race	Keswick, Cumbria, England	2nd
2009	Commonwealth Mountain and Ultra Distance Running Championships	Up and downhill race	Keswick, Cumbria, England	5th
2009	Commonwealth Mountain and Ultra Distance Running Championships	Up & downhill team race	Keswick, Cumbria, England	3rd
2010	World Masters Mountain Running Championship		Korbielow, Poland	1st
2010	Skyrunning World Championships	Vertical Kilometer	Canazei, Italy	3rd
2011	Commonwealth Mountain and Ultra Distance Running Championships	55 km trail	Llandudno, Conwy, Wales	2nd
2011	Commonwealth Mountain and Ultra Distance Running Championships	Team championship	Llandudno, Conwy, Wales	2nd

== World Cup wins ==
#	Season	Date	Race	Discipline
1	2006	May 28	Maratòn Alpina Zegama-Aizkorri	SkyRace
2	2006	June 11	Valmalenco-Valposchiavo	SkyRace
3	2006	June 25	OSJ Ontake SkyRace	SkyRace
4	2006	July 23	Dolomites SkyRace	SkyRace
5	2007	May 20	Marató de Muntanya de Berga	Sky Marathon
6	2007	July 22	SkyRace Andorra	SkyRace
7	2007	July 29	Dolomites SkyRace	SkyRace
8	2008	June 8	Valmalenco-Valposchiavo	SkyRace
9	2008	September 6	Ben Nevis Race	SkyRace
