= NACAC Mountain Running Championships =

Annual sporting competition

- Sport: Mountain running
- Founded: 2004
- Continent: North America (NACAC)

The NACAC Mountain Running Championships is an annual Mountain running competition organized by NACAC for athletes representing the countries of its member associations. Until 2012, only the participation of athletes from Canada, Mexico, and the United States was reported. The event was established in 2004.

The 2020 championships were cancelled. It was not held again until 2023, when it became part of the new NACAC Mountain and Trail Running Championships event alongside a trail running race. The 2024 edition of this combined event was also cancelled.

== Editions ==
	Year	City	Country	Date
I	2004	Vail, Colorado	United States	July 4
II	2005	Vail, Colorado	United States	June 4
III	2006	Ajijic, Jalisco	Mexico	June 25
IV	2007	Canmore, Alberta	Canada	July 28
V	2008	Tepatitlán, Jalisco	Mexico	June 15
VI	2009	Mount Cranmore, North Conway, New Hampshire	United States	June 28
VII	2010	Canmore, Alberta	Canada	July 9
VIII	2011	Ajijic, Jalisco	Mexico	July 17
IX	2012	Cypress Mountain, West Vancouver, British Columbia	Canada	July 21
X	2013	Mount Cranmore, North Conway, New Hampshire	United States	July 21
XI	2014	Ajijic, Jalisco	Mexico	July 20
XII	2015	Cypress Mountain, West Vancouver, British Columbia	Canada	July 18
XIII	2016	Cerro Gordo, Tepatitlán	Mexico	July 10
XIV	2017	Golden, British Columbia	Canada	September 24
XV	2018	Loon Mountain	United States	July 8
XVI	2019	Cerro Gordo, Tepatitlán	Mexico	October 20

== Results ==
Americans Morgan Arritola and Joe Gray won the women's and men's title respectively at the 2013 championships.

=== Men ===
Year	Gold	Silver	Bronze
2004	Paul Low; United States	Peter de la Cerda; United States	Simon Gutierrez; United States
2005	Matt Carpenter; United States	Tim Parr; United States	Clint Wells; United States
2006	Ranulfo Sánchez; Mexico	Juan Carlos Carera; Mexico	Tomás Perez Nava; Mexico
2007	Nick Schuetze; United States	Ivan Babikov; Canada	Adrian Lambert; Canada
2008	Juan Carlos Carera; Mexico	Ranulfo Sánchez; Mexico	Shiloh Mielke; United States
2009	Joe Gray; United States	Rickey Gates; United States	Eric Blake; United States
2010	Joe Gray; United States	Taylor Murphy; Canada	Adrian Lambert; Canada
2011	Joe Gray; United States	Ranulfo Sánchez; Mexico	James Gosselin; Canada
2012	Joe Gray; United States	James Gosselin; Canada	Robert Krar; Canada
2013	Joe Gray; United States	Max King; United States	Glenn Randall; United States
2014	Mario Alberto Ramiro Allende; Mexico	Enrique Camarena Camberos; Mexico	Ángel Orlando Quintero Ramírez; Mexico
2015	Nick Elson; Canada	Kristopher Swanson; Canada	Shaun Stephens-Whale; Canada
2016	Juan Carlos Carera; Mexico	Josh Eberly; United States	Victor Mercado; Mexico
2017	Juan Carlos Carera; Mexico	Mike Popejoy; United States	Josh Eberly; United States
2018	Joe Gray; United States	Andy Wacker; United States	Mike Popejoy; United States
2019	Andy Wacker; United States	Jesús Nava Águila; Mexico	Flore Brayan Rodríguez; Mexico

=== Women ===
Year	Gold	Silver	Bronze
2004	Kelly Ryan; United States	Kelly Low; United States	Rene Frazee; United States
2005	Laura Haefeli; United States	Chris Lundy; United States	Lisa Isom; United States
2006	Federica Villa Márquez; Mexico	Daniela Saucedo; Mexico	María Elizabeth Vera; Mexico
2007	Chris Lundy; United States	Lisa Goldsmith; United States	Katrina Driver; Canada
2008	Kasie Enman; United States	Laura Flores Dávila; Mexico	Alison Bryant; United States
2009	Chris Lundy; United States	Brandy Erholtz; United States	Laura Haefeli; United States
2010	Brandy Erholtz; United States	Megan Lund; United States	Chris Lundy; United States
2011	Maria Dalzot; United States	Chris Lundy; United States	Amber Moran; United States
2012	Brandy Erholtz; United States	Amber Moran; United States	Maria Dalzot; United States
2013	Morgan Arritola; United States	Megan Lizotte; United States	Amber Reece-Young; United States
2014	Brandy Erholtz; United States	Maria Dalzot; United States	Chris Lundy; United States
2015	Chessa Adsit-Morris; Canada	Megan Roche; United States	Mandy Ortiz; United States
2016	Megan Roche; United States	Ladia Albertson; United States	Meggan Franks; Canada
2017	Susana Bautista Villegas; Mexico	Megan Roche; United States	Colleen Wilson; Canada
2018	Allie McLaughlin; United States	Citlali Cristian; Mexico	Addie Bracy; United States
2019	Dani Moreno; United States	Sam Lewis; United States	Susana Bautista; Mexico

== See also ==
- World Mountain Running Championships
- European Mountain Running Championships
- South American Mountain Running Championships
- World Long Distance Mountain Running Championships
- Commonwealth Mountain and Ultradistance Running Championships
