= Matthew Carpenter =

Matthew Carpenter may refer to:

- Matthew H. Carpenter (1824–1881), U.S. senator from Wisconsin
- Matt Carpenter (born 1985), American baseball infielder
- Matt Carpenter (runner) (born 1964), American ultramarathoner

== See also ==
- Carpenter (surname)
