= Pikes Peak Marathon =

Annual race in the United States held since 1956

Coordinates: 38°50′26″N 105°02′39″W

- Date: September
- Location: Manitou Springs, Colorado, United States
- Event type: Road and trail
- Distance: Marathon and half-marathon
- Established: 1956 (70 years ago)
- Course records: Ascent: 2:00:20 (M), 2:24:58 (F); Marathon: 3:16:39 (M), 4:02:45 (F)
- Website: www.pikespeakmarathon.org
- Participants: 1354 finishers (Ascent) (2023); 616 finishers (Marathon) (2023)

The Pikes Peak Ascent and Marathon is a trail running competition that begins at the base of Pikes Peak, in Manitou Springs, Colorado, and climbs over 7,815 feet (2382 m) to the top of the 14,115 foot (4302 m) peak. Since 1956, the event takes place each year in late summer, with the Ascent taking place on Saturday (slightly longer than a half-marathon, at 13.3 miles), and the round-trip marathon on Sunday.

== History ==
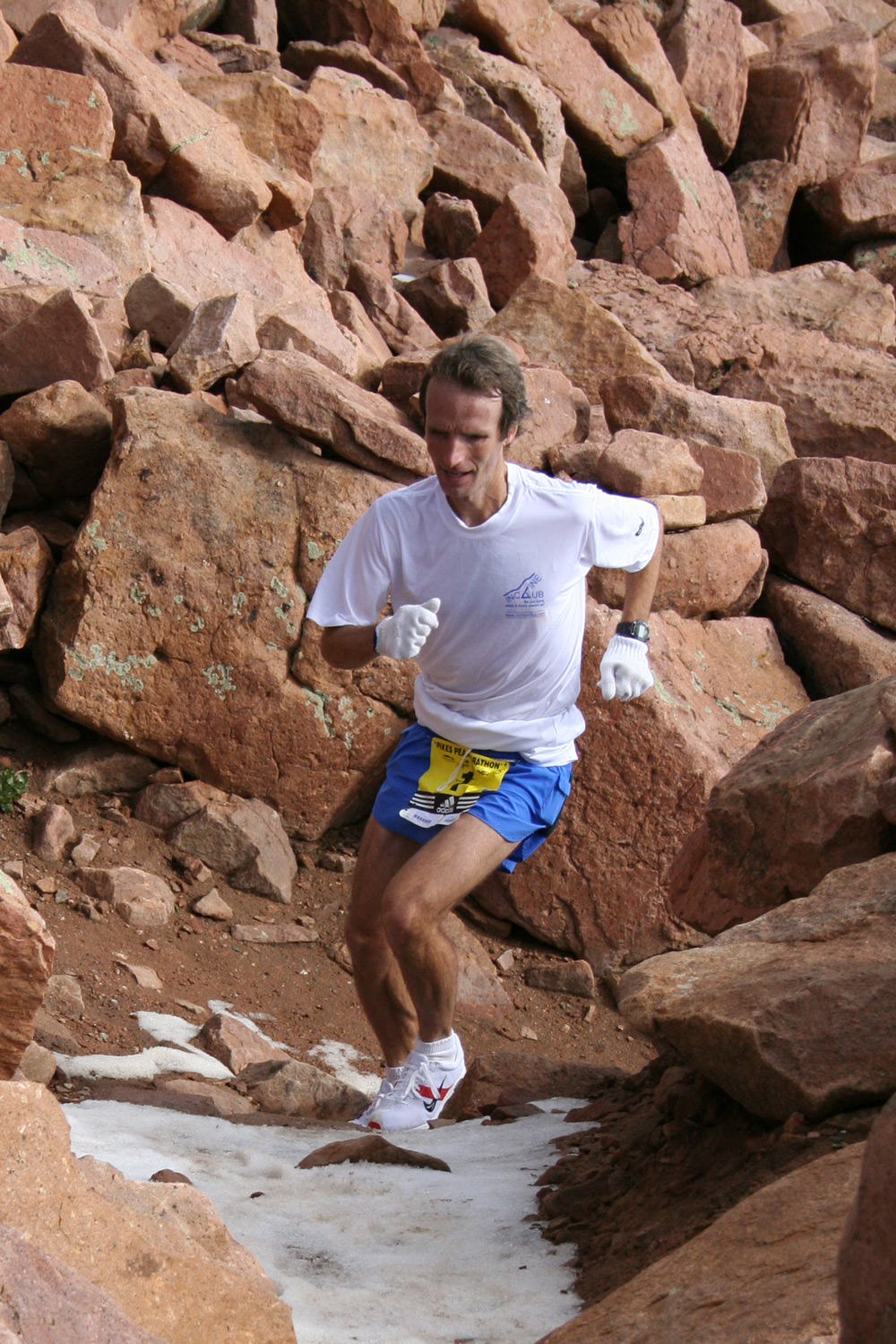
Matt Carpenter, 42, approaching the summit of Pikes Peak during the 2006 Pikes Peak Marathon. Carpenter reached the summit in 2:08:27 on his way to a 3:33:07 win in the Marathon.

On August 10, 1956, Dr. Arne Suominen of Del Ray Beach, Fla., challenged smokers and nonsmokers to race up and down Pikes Peak, a 26-mile (42 km) race, in conjunction with the 150th anniversary of the discovery of America's most famous mountain by Zebulon Montgomery Pike. He enlisted 58-year-old real-estate salesman and holistic-lifestyle practitioner Rudy Fahl as the race director. The 56-year-old Suominen, a Finnish former marathon champion and outspoken critic of tobacco, wanted to prove that smoking diminished one's physical endurance. Of the 13 runners that accepted the challenge, only three were smokers. Lou Wille, champion of two Pikes Peak races in the late 1930s and a two-pack-a-day smoker, was likely the biggest threat to Suominen's hypothesis.

Although he had beaten Suominen to the summit, Wille was disqualified for not finishing the race. In fact none of the smokers completed the round trip. "I think I've proven my point," Suominen said afterwards. "I finished the race and none of the smokers did."

It was widely rumored that the runner Jecker's motivation came from an American Tobacco Association offer to reward a victorious smoker with $20,000.

The Pikes Peak Marathon was the first American marathon to allow female competitors, allowing them from the beginning of the marathon in 1956, although no woman entered until 1958. In 1959, Arlene Pieper became the first woman to officially finish a marathon in the United States when she finished the Pikes Peak Marathon. Her daughter, Kathie, aged 9, became the youngest competitor at that time to finish the race to the summit; however, she did not finish the whole marathon.

In 1966 a well-organized marathon was initiated, making the race the third-oldest marathon in the United States. In 1980 a good friend Rudy Faul and fellow runner Carl McDaniel took over as race director; he served as director until 1998 and was named director emeritus in 1999 until his death on August 23, 1999, only one day after the race was held that year.

The Pikes Peak Ascent race has twice incorporated the World Long Distance Mountain Running Challenge competition, first in 2006 then again in 2010.

The 2020 edition of the ascent was canceled due to the coronavirus pandemic, with all registrants given the option of either transferring their entry to 2021, (Note: With this option, qualifying times for 2020 would be honored for 2021.) obtaining a partial refund and priority registration for 2021, (Note: With this option, half of the entry fee would be refunded, and the other half donated to Rocky Mountain Field Institute and the El Paso County Search and Rescue. In addition, prices and qualifying times for 2020 would be honored for 2021.) or obtaining a full refund. At the time the ascent was canceled, the race directors were still hopeful that the marathon could be held, due to the limited number of runners in the marathon and the comparatively lower level of logistics required at the summit, since runners would be making their own way down the mountain. However, registered marathon runners were also given the same options as those registered for the ascent, should they choose to withdraw from the race. Eventually, the race organizers announced that the marathon would be held, with coronavirus considerations, including canceling or paring down related events, requiring masks or other face coverings before and after the race, enforcing social distancing regulations at the start and finish, starting the runners in small waves, (Note: Runners usually started in waves of about 100 runners.) and eliminating some aid stations.

== Course ==
External image
- Course map of full marathon in 2020

Because of the nature of the run (dirt trails, rock, and other natural obstacles) and the high altitude, the race is much more difficult than standard 42.195-kilometre (26.219 mi) marathons. Winning times for the marathon are typically just under four hours (compared to elite "flatland" marathon times of just over two hours). Although the average grade of the slope is 11%, some sections are much steeper because the central portion of the race is relatively flat. The initial three miles (5 km) are very steep. The central 7 miles (11 km) start as rolling terrain, but become progressively steeper toward the end. The top 3 miles (4.8 km) are above timberline and require some rock scrambling to reach the summit. Oxygen levels drop progressively as altitude rises, further compounding the uphill ordeal.

Winning race times differ significantly from year to year, often depending on weather and trail conditions. Some races have been associated with hot, dry conditions, and others have been associated with snow and cold at the top of the peak.

The race attracts hundreds of runners for both the ascent and for the round-trip. The USDA Forest Service limits the number of runners to 1,800 for the ascent and 800 for the marathon, and the race registration typically fills in one or two days.

== Winners ==
=== Marathon ===
The following table shows the official winners of the marathon. Course records are highlighted with green background.

The race was lengthened by 1.1 miles in 1976, so that 7–8 minutes must be added to the pre-1976 times for comparison purposes.

The most successful male and female athletes in the history of the marathon are Matt Carpenter, outright record holder and winner of the marathon on twelve occasions between 1988 and 2011, and Erica Larson, who has won the women's race five times. Carpenter won six times in a row in 2006–2011, as did Steve Gachupin in 1966–1970. Larson won four times in a row in 1999–2002, as did Danelle Ballengee in 1994–1997.

In 2024, the marathon was shortened due to snow and ice. Runners turned around at Barr Camp instead of the peak, which meant the race was shortened by about a third of the typical 26.2 mile distance.

Year	Country	Man	Time	Country	Woman	Time	Notes
2026	USA	Darren Thomas	3:57:00	USA	Chrissy Lofgren	5:01:08	
2025	USA	Jonathan Aziz	3:54:07	USA	Kristina M Mascarenas	4:35:10	
2024	USA	Jonathan Aziz	1:46:10*		Sarah Guhl	2:10:55*	*2024 race was cut short due to weather
2023	USA	Jonathan Aziz	3:43:45	USA	Kristina M Mascarenas	4:31:30	
2022	USA	Jonathan Aziz	3:40:41	USA	Kristina M Mascarenas	4:37:31	
2021	USA	Seth DeMoor	3:36:33	USA	Stevie Kremer	4:34:45	
2020	USA	Seth DeMoor	3:36:31	USA	Brittany Charboneau	4:25:21	
2019	ESP	Kilian Jornet Burgada	3:27:28	SUI	Maude Mathys	4:02:41	
2018	USA	Dakota Jones	3:32:21	USA	Megan Kimmel	4:15:06	
2017	SUI	Rémi Bonnet	3:37:08	USA	Kristina Marie Mascarenas	4:38:54	
2016	USA	Alex Nichols	3:40:29	USA	Kim Dobson	4:44:44	
2015	USA	Alex Nichols	3:46:40	USA	Hirut Guangul	4:29:06	
2014	SUI	Marc Lauenstein	3:37:21	USA	Anita M Ortiz	5:00:54	
2013	JPN	Touru Miyahara	3:43:23	USA	Stevie Kremer	4:17:10	
2012	ESP	Kilian Jornet Burgada	3:40:26	SWE	Emelie Forsberg	4:28:07	
2011	USA	Matt Carpenter	3:48:08	USA	JoAnna C Masloski	5:09:38	
2010	USA	Matt Carpenter	3:51:34	USA	Keri A Nelson	4:34:24	
2009	USA	Matt Carpenter	3:37:02	USA	Anita M Ortiz	4:28:20	
2008	USA	Matt Carpenter	3:36:54	USA	Keri A Nelson	4:39:00	
2007	USA	Matt Carpenter	3:48:41	USA	Salynda E Fleury	5:00:42	
2006	USA	Matt Carpenter	3:33:07	AUS	Emma J Murray	4:21:09	
2005	ITA	Fulvio Dapit	3:58:49	FRA	Corinne Favre	4:31:20	
2004	USA	Galen Burrell	4:00:04	USA	Erica Larson	4:28:27	
2003	USA	Matt Carpenter	3:43:46	UK	Angela Mudge	4:19:38	
2002	USA	Jesse T Rickert	4:10:15	USA	Erica Larson	4:41:53	
2001	USA	Matt Carpenter	3:53:53	USA	Erica Larson	4:49:10	
2000	USA	Stephen D Smalzel	3:54:46	USA	Erica Larson	4:50:37	
1999	USA	Stephen D Smalzel	3:49:09	USA	Erica Larson	4:46:01	
1998	USA	Matt Carpenter	3:44:27	USA	Mariko Shirazi	4:54:34	
1997	MEX	Ricardo Mejía	3:30:55	USA	Danelle Ballengee	4:43:46	
1996	MEX	Ricardo Mejía	3:29:22	USA	Danelle Ballengee	4:36:52	
1995	MEX	Ricardo Mejía	3:21:32	USA	Danelle Ballengee	4:38:55	
1994	MEX	Martin Rodriguez	3:35:04	USA	Danelle Ballengee	4:24:38	
1993	USA	Matt Carpenter	3:16:39	USA	Karen E Gorman	4:42:03	
1992	MEX	Ricardo Mejía	3:24:25	USA	Jo H Gathercole	4:44:15	
1991	USA	Stephen D Smalzel	3:46:43	USA	Deborah Wagner	4:45:59	
1990	MEX	Ricardo Mejía	3:35:03	USA	Cylinda Engelman	4:44:18	
1989	USA	Matt Carpenter	3:39:26	USA	Linda Quinlisk	4:41:51	
1988	USA	Matt Carpenter	3:38:05	USA	Linda Quinlisk	4:29:59	
1987	USA	Sheldon A Larson	3:41:56	USA	Gail Ladage Scott	4:26:59	
1986	USA	Stan W Fox	3:41:57	USA	Margie Loyd-Allison	4:55:43	
1985	USA	Creighton J King	3:39:39	USA	Linda Quinlisk	4:37:32	
1984	USA	Wesley Smith	3:39:00	USA	Gail Ladage Scott	4:48:26	
1983	USA	Creighton J King	3:39:50	USA	Margie Loyd-Allison	4:39:59	
1982	USA	Al Waquie	3:29:53	USA	Gabrielle Andersen	4:25:13	
1981	USA	Al Waquie	3:26:17	USA	Lynn Bjorklund	4:15:18	
1980	USA	Chris G Reveley	3:45:52	USA	Linda Quinlisk	4:38:00	
1979	USA	Chris G Reveley	3:39:08	USA	Sue Gladney	4:42:45	
1978	USA	Ken Young	3:50:44	USA	Donna L Messenger	5:08:08	
1977	USA	Rick Trujillo	3:46:21	USA	Ellen O'Connor	5:50:09	
1976	USA	Rick Trujillo	3:34:15	USA	Donna L Messenger	5:05:40	
1975	USA	Rick Trujillo	3:31:05	USA	Joan Ullyut	5:20:21	
1974	USA	Rick Trujillo	3:36:40	USA	Marcia Trent	5:23:10	
1973	USA	Rick Trujillo	3:39:46	USA	Joan Ullyut	5:28:00	
1972	USA	Chuck Smead	3:44:21	USA	Isa C Varela	7:25:00	
1971	USA	Steve Gachupin	3:46:26	USA	Joyce Swannack	7:07:36	
1970	USA	Steve Gachupin	3:45:52				
1969	USA	Steve Gachupin	3:44:50				
1968	USA	Steve Gachupin	3:39:47				
1967	USA	Steve Gachupin	3:58:51				
1966	USA	Steve Gachupin	3:57:04				
1965	USA	John R Rose	3:53:57				
1964	USA	Donald Lakin	4:03:33				
1963	USA	John R Rose	4:01:22				
1962	USA	Robert Mohler	4:10:03				
1961	USA	Calvin Hansen	4:07:15				
1960	USA	Calvin Hansen	4:14:25				
1959	USA	Calvin Hansen	4:20:18	USA	Arlene Pieper	9:16:00	
1958	USA	Calvin Hansen	4:29:40				
1957	USA	Monte Wolford	5:15:53				
1956	USA	Monte Wolford	5:39:58				

=== Ascent ===
The following table shows the official winners of the Ascent. Course records are highlighted with green background. The longest-standing men's Ascent record (set during the Marathon in 1993 by Matt Carpenter with a time of 2:01:06) was broken after 30 years in the 2023 Ascent by Rémi Bonnet with a time of 2:00:20.

The 2018 Ascent was run on a shortened course of 7.6 miles, finishing at Barr Camp, due to inclement weather being forecast.

Year	Country	Man	Time	Country	Woman	Time
2026	USA	Joseph Gray	2:15:14	USA	Anna Gibson	2:37:22
2025	USA	Brian Whitfield	2:13:31	USA	Sarah Carter	2:46:49
2024	USA	Joseph Gray	2:11:13	USA	Allie McLaughlin	2:45:36
2023	SWI	Rémi Bonnet	2:00:20	USA	Sophia Laukli	2:35:54
2022	SWI	Rémi Bonnet	2:07:02	NED	Nienke Frederiek Brinkman	2:27:24
2021	USA	Joseph Gray	2:12:38	USA	Allie McLaughlin	2:49:40
2020	canceled due to coronavirus pandemic					
2019	USA	Joseph Gray	2:09:00	USA	Kim Dobson	2:41:44
2018	ERI	Azerya Tekay Weldemariam	1:06:28	USA	Kim Dobson	1:15:51
2017	USA	Joseph Gray	2:08:19	USA	Serkalem Biset Abrha	2:42:19
2016	USA	Joseph Gray	2:05:28	USA	Kim Dobson	2:34:39
2015	JPN	Touru Miyahara	2:15:42	USA	Kim Dobson	2:40:44
2014	USA	Sage Canaday	2:10:03	USA	Allie McLaughlin	2:33:42
2013	USA	Eric Blake	2:13:45	USA	Kim Dobson	2:41:43
2012	USA	Jason Delaney	2:13:18	USA	Kim Dobson	2:24:58
2011	USA	Mario Macias	2:08:57	USA	Kim Dobson	2:34:07
2010	USA	Glenn Randall	2:09:28	USA	Brandy Erholtz	2:41:38
2009	USA	Tim Parr	2:12:32	USA	Megan Kimmel	2:40:16
2008	USA	Simon Gutierrez	2:18:09	USA	Brandy Erholtz	2:41:26
2007	USA	Matt Carpenter	2:12:56	USA	Maria Portilla	2:35:46
2006	USA	Simon Gutierrez	2:18:06	USA	Lisa Goldsmith	2:46:07
2005	USA	Ryan Hafer	2:21:30	USA	Lisa Goldsmith	2:50:02
2004	USA	Scott Elliott	2:23:31	USA	Anita Ortiz	2:44:58
2003	USA	Simon Gutierrez	2:13:29	USA	Anita Ortiz	2:52:11
2002	USA	Matt Carpenter	2:23:22	USA	Anita Ortiz	2:44:33
2001	USA	Matt Carpenter	2:16:13	USA	Anita Ortiz	2:47:09
2000	USA	Scott Elliott	2:16:00	USA	Cindy O'Neill	2:50:52
1999	USA	Jeremy Wright	2:18:32	USA	Cindy O'Neill	2:45:17
1998	USA	Jeremy Wright	2:26:48	USA	Cindy O'Neill	2:45:11
1997	USA	Matt Carpenter	2:10:41	USA	Kirsten Ames	2:46:43
1996	MEX	Martin Rodriguez	2:11:11	USA	Marti Cooksey	2:50:11
1995	USA	Michael Tobin	2:12:03	USA	Marie Boyd	2:44:36
1994	USA	Matt Carpenter	2:09:35	USA	Marie Boyd	2:38:22
1993	USA	Scott Elliott	2:13:39	USA	J'ne Day-Lucore	2:43:51
1992	USA	Scott Elliott	2:11:11	USA	J'ne Day-Lucore	2:48:28
1991	USA	Scott Elliott	2:11:58	USA	Allison Shayne	2:48:36
1990	USA	Matt Carpenter	2:07:36	USA	J'ne Day-Lucore	2:44:40
1989	USA	Scott Elliott	2:06:47	USA	J'ne Day-Lucore	2:37:35
1988	USA	Scott Elliott	2:11:10	USA	Lynn Brown	2:48:39
1987	USA	Scott Elliott	2:09:33	USA	Christine Maisto	2:39:01
1986	USA	Chester Carl	2:10:54	USA	Judy Chamberlin	2:52:11
1985	USA	Al Waquie	2:10:06	USA	Judy Chamberlin	2:41:25
1984	USA	Chester Carl	2:13:25	USA	Judy Chamberlin	2:49:31
1983	USA	Chester Carl	2:12:54	USA	Lize Brittin	2:39:44
1982	USA	Ron McCurley	2:17:18	USA	Diane Israel	2:47:32
1981	USA	Pat Porter	2:12:35	USA	Joyce Rankin	3:09:15
1980				USA	Lynn Bjorklund	2:41:06
1979						
1978				USA	Marti Cooksey	2:46:44
1977	USA	David Casillas	2:12:24	USA	Donna Messenger	3:11:15
1976	USA	Chuck Smead	2:05:22	USA	Lynn Bjorklund	2:44:47
1975				USA	Donna Messenger	3:02:24
1974	USA	Chuck Smead	2:09:59	USA	Donna Messenger	23:04:54
1973						
1972				USA	Donna Messenger	3:28:26
1971						
1970				USA	Pamela Schmidt	7:21:00
1969						
1968						
1967						
1966						
1965						
1964				USA	Mary Felts	3:52:15
1963				USA	Mary Felts	4:05:00
1962				USA	Mary Felts	4:15:29
1961				USA	Kathleen Bernard	4:42:24
1960						
1959				USA	Katherine Heard-Fahl	5:17:52
1936	USA	Lou Wille	3:00:55	USA	Agnes Nellesen	6:42:00

== See also ==
- Mount Lemmon Marathon
