= Moray Marathon =

Scotland running event

The oldest running marathon in Scotland, the first Moray Marathon was held in 1982 and since then it has developed into a 3 in 1 running event incorporating the Marathon, Half Marathon and 10K Road Races. In 2014 the venue was changed from the Cooper Park to the Glen Moray Distillery, and was run on a different course.

== Moray Marathon 2006 ==
The 2006 event celebrated the 25th anniversary of the marathon with Simon Pride (Forres Harriers) finishing in 2:39:53 to win the event for the 5th time and Kate Jenkins (Gala Harriers) first woman home in 2:58:29 to win her 8th Moray Marathon.

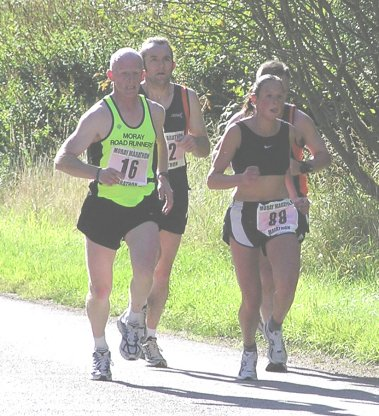
Kate Jenkins on her way to her 8th win.

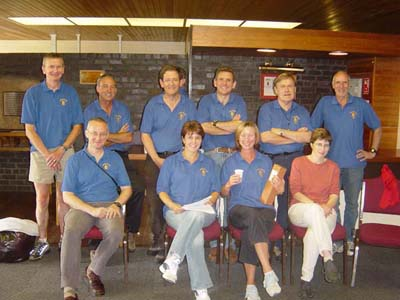
The Marathon organisers

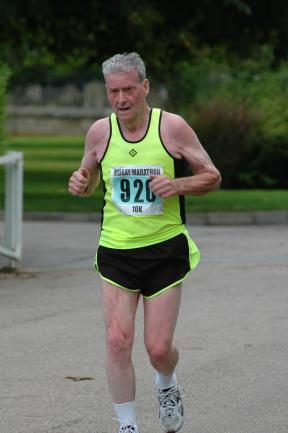
Moray Roadrunner Jim McArthur.

The half marathon was won by John Goodall (Keith and District) in 1:15:35 with Sarah Liebnitz (U\A ex Moray Roadrunners Jnr) first woman in 1:33:59.
The 10K was won by Mike Stewart (Keith and District) in 33:51, first woman home was Elaine Whyte (Fraserburgh RC) in 39:58.

== Glen Moray Marathon 2016 ==
A Moray road race was thrown into chaos yesterday a dozen runners were forced to run an extra four miles after being led in the wrong direction. The winner of the Glen Moray Marathon eventually completed more than 30 miles after marshalls directed him along the wrong route. Connell Drummond, from Kilmarnock, had a clear lead over the pack but had to battle back from 16th place following the navigation error. Instead of heading away from Elgin the competitors almost ended up back in the town when the escort car realised the mistake.

Last night organisers explained they felt “physically sick” after being told about the error over radio – initially fearing the entire field had taken a wrong turn. Mr Drummond said: “I was only about three miles into it and I could see the lead car was slowing down – I knew something wasn’t right. I was just jogging on the spot and he shouted out the marshal had sent him the wrong way and I better turn round, which was good advice I suppose.”

It is understood that a local entrant following further down the field realised the mistake and prevented all 55 runners becoming lost. On his way back to the track Mr Drummond passed other runners and told them to follow him following the blunder. Co-organiser Paul Rogan said a miscommunication between a marshal and the escort car resulted in the wrong-turn at a T-junction near Mosstowie Primary School. He said: “It looks like by the time they’ve realised the mistake about a dozen runners have gone the wrong way. It’s very frustrating. “Everyone has taken it in good spirits though. It was human error, these things can happen.”

A contingency plan was put in place, giving runners the option of a short-cut to get to the finish after running 26 miles. Entrants at the finish line who declined the shorter route joked it was good preparation for an ultra-marathon. Mr Drummond was not put off by the extra distance and fought back through the field to win the race despite with a time of 3hours 16minutes and 11seconds – 35 minutes slower than his personal best set earlier this year. He said: “I was annoyed at the time but these things happen. I just got my head down and battled back through.”

== Marathon winners 1982– ==
Year	Time (h:m:s)	Men	Club	Time (h:m:s)	Women	Club
1982		Don Ritchie	Forres Harriers		C Wallach	U\A
1983		Don Ritchie	Forres Harriers		Eileen Forbe & Morag Thow	U\A
1984		Don Ritchie	Forres Harriers		Sheila Cluley	Forfar RR
1985		Graham Flatters	Dundee Hawkhill Harriers		Morag Taggart	Pitreavie
1986		Don Ritchie	Forres Harriers		Margret Robertson	Dunndee RR
1987		Don Ritchie	Forres Harriers		Frances Guy	Belgrove H
1988		Mick Francis	Forres Harriers		Margaret McDonald	Peterhead RR
1989		Charlie McIntyre	Fraserburgh		Sheila Catford	U\A
1990		Eric Seedhouse	City of Hull		Margret Robertson	Dundee RR
1991		Ron Kirkton	Milburn Harriers		Fiona Nicholson	Forfar RR
1992		Fraser Clyne	Metro Aberdeen		Trudi Thomson	Pitreavie
1993		David Lancaster	Rowantree Club, York		Diane Harvey	Tipton Harriers
1994		David Lancaster	Rowantree Club, York		Morag Cumming	Aberdeen AAC
1995		Alan Reid	Peterhead AAC		Lynda Bain	Garioch RR
1996		Allan Stewart	Moray Roadrunners		Linda Trahan	Garioch
1997		Fraser Clyne	Metro Aberdeen		Kate Jenkins	Carnethy
1998		Simon Pride	Keith & District		Kate Jenkins	Carnethy
1999		David Lancaster	Rowantree Club, York		Kate Jenkins	Carnethy
2000		Simon Pride	Keith & District		Kate Jenkins	Carnethy
2001		Simon Pride	Keith & District		Trudi Thomson	Pitreavie
2002		Brian Fieldsend	Inverness Harriers		Kate Jenkins	Carnethy
2003	2:34:08	Jamie Reid	Ron Hill Cambuslang	3:09:18	Kate Jenkins	Carnethy
2004	2:36:49	Simon Pride	Metro Aberdeen	3:07:48	Jenny Robertson	U\A
2005	2:32:22	Ian Fisher	Altrincham AAC	3:08:18	Kate Jenkins	Carnethy
2006	2:39:53	Simon Pride	Forres Harriers	2:58:29	Kate Jenkins	Gala Harriers
2007	2:33:11	Jamie Reid	Cambuslang	3:10:43	Kate Jenkins	Gala Harriers
2008	2:43:11	Niku Millot	Metro Aberdeen	3:02:06	Kate Jenkins	Gala Harriers
2009	2:41:47	Martin Ferguson	Edinburgh AC	2:57:59	Kate Jenkins	Hunters Bog Trotters
2010	2:45:57	Steven Reid	Fife AC	3:01:30	Kate Jenkins	Hunters Bog Trotters
2011	2:44:12	Gareth Mayze	Teviotdale	3:00:17	Kate Jenkins	Hunters Bog Trotters
2012	2:48:15	Paul Carrol	U\A	3:03:25	Kate Jenkins	Hunters Bog Trotters
2013	2:39:17	Tony Jackson	Perth Roadrunners	2:53:52	Ellie Greenwood	Serpentine / Montrail / Vancouver Falcons
2014	2:45:40	Wayne Dashper	Forres Harriers	3:21:47	Elaine Sheridan	Garioch RR
2015	2:46:26	John Hammond	Carnethy Hill Running Club	3:16:12	Debbie Moore	N/A
2016	3:16:14	Connell Drummond	Kilmarnock Harriers & AC	3:21:05	Mary McCutcheon	Giffnock North AAC
2017	Cancelled					

== Course records (Finish at Cooper park 1982-2013) ==
- Marathon
  - Men – Simon Pride – Keith & District – 2 h 21 min 17 s
  - Women - Trudi Thomson – Pitreavie AAC – 2 h 49 min 43 s
- Half marathon
  - Men – Graham Crawford – Springburn Harriers – 1 h 06 min 09 s
  - Women – Lyn Harding – Houghton AC – 1h 14 min 58 s
- 10 K
  - Men – Chris Hall – Aberdeen AAC – 29 min 46 s
  - Women – Lyn Harding – Houghton AC – 33 min 58 s

== Course records (Finish at Glen Moray Distillery since 2014) ==
- Marathon
  - Men – Wayne Dashper - Forres Harriers - 2 h 45 min 40 s (2014)
  - Women - Debbie Moore - Unattached - 3 h 16 min 12 s (2015)
- Half marathon
  - Men – John Newsom - Inverness Harriers - 1h 12 min 55 s (2015)
  - Women – Sarah Liebnitz - Inverness Harriers - 1 h 22 min 10 s (2014)
- 10 K
  - Men – Gordon Lennox - Forres Harriers - 33 min 10 s (2014 & 2015)
  - Women – Sarah Liebnitz - Inverness Harriers - 38 min 16 s (2016)
