= Trudi Thomson =

British distance runner

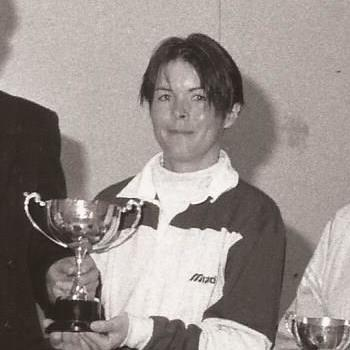
- Thomson in 1996

Personal information
- Nationality: British
- Born: 18 January 1959 (age 67)
- Years active: 1991–2005
- Spouse: Iain Thomson

Sport
- Sport: Running
- Events: Half marathon; Marathon; Ultramarathon
- Club: Pitreavie AAC
Medal record
Ultramarathon
Representing Great Britain
IAU 100 km World Championships
Silver medal – second place	1994 Lake Saroma	100 km
Silver medal – second place	1993 Flanders	Women's team
Bronze medal – third place	1994 Lake Saroma	Women's team

Trudi Thomson (née Green; born 18 January 1959) is a British former distance runner and ultramarathon runner who competed for Great Britain at the IAU 100 km World Championships in 1993 and 1994, the IAAF 1995 World Cup Marathon, the IAAF 1995 World Championships Marathon and the IAAF 1995 World Championships Half Marathon. She represented Scotland at the 1999 World Mountain Running Trophy.

She finished second at IAU 100 km World Championships in 1994, setting a British record (7:42:17).

Thomson was the Scottish marathon champion twice and was in the top ten in the Scottish rankings for the marathon for every year from 1992 to 2004, topping the rankings in 1999 and 2003. She was Scottish masters cross country champion five times.

== Biography ==
Trudi Thomson was born in Middlesex and lives in Dunfermline, Fife. She married Iain Thomson in Dunfermline in 1981 and they had three daughters. They divorced in 2014.

Thomson took up running in her early thirties in order to get fit and lose weight after the birth of her third daughter in 1989. She had started smoking at 11 and had smoked twenty cigarettes a day from the age of 18. After starting running in 1990, it took her four years to give up smoking. She had had rheumatoid arthritis since the birth of her first daughter in 1982 and this caused her a lot of pain. She also had the eating disorder bulimia and spoke openly about how this had affected her.

=== Distance racing career ===
Thomson joined Pitreavie Amateur Athletics Club and competed for the club throughout her running career. She quickly made her mark at the marathon distance, winning the Black Isle Festival of Running Marathon in November 1991 in a time of 3:12:39.

In June 1992, Thomson won the Loch Rannoch Marathon. This was followed on 2 August with a win at the Moray Marathon in Elgin, the first of Thomson's two Scottish Marathon Championship wins. In October, she lowered her personal best time to 3:05:43 when she won the Selby Marathon.

In 1993 and 1994, Thomson steadily improved her marathon times and in October 1994 she finished third in the Dublin Marathon in a time of 2:43:18. She was coached for some time by John Linnaker, the former Scottish steeplechase record holder, and began to concentrate on the marathon and shorter distances.

In 1995, Thomson was selected to represent Great Britain in the IAAF World Cup Marathon in Athens alongside another Scottish runner, Alison Rose. Thomson finished 25th in a personal best time of 2:42:44. Her 25th place qualified her for selection for the 5th IAAF World Championships held in Gothenburg, Sweden, in August 1995. The women's marathon took place on the opening day, 5 August. Thomson finished in 22nd place in what would have been a new personal best time. However, later that day the event organiser admitted that the course had been 400 metres short.

On 30 October that year, Thomson won the Dublin Marathon in her all-time personal best – 2:38:23.

Over the course of her running career, Thomson competed in over 40 marathons winning 14 of them. Her marathon wins were: Black Isle Festival of Running (1991, 1993), Loch Rannoch (1992, 1993), Moray (1992, 2001), Selby (1992), Abingdon (1993), Lochaber (1994), Dublin (1995), Belfast City (1996, 2002, 2003) and Loch Ness (2003). She was invited to run marathons in many countries including at Sliema in Malta (1994), Walt Disney World in Florida (1995), Las Vegas (1996), Singapore (1996), Dubai (2000, 2001), Stockholm (2000, 2002), Pyongyang, North Korea (2001), Seville (2002), Beirut (2003) and Mumbai (2004). Her second win at the Scottish Marathon Championship was in 2001, again at the Moray Marathon. She competed in the London Marathon four times, placing 18th in 1994.

Thomson was in the top ten in the Scottish rankings for the marathon for every year from 1992 to 2004, topping the rankings in 1999 and 2003.

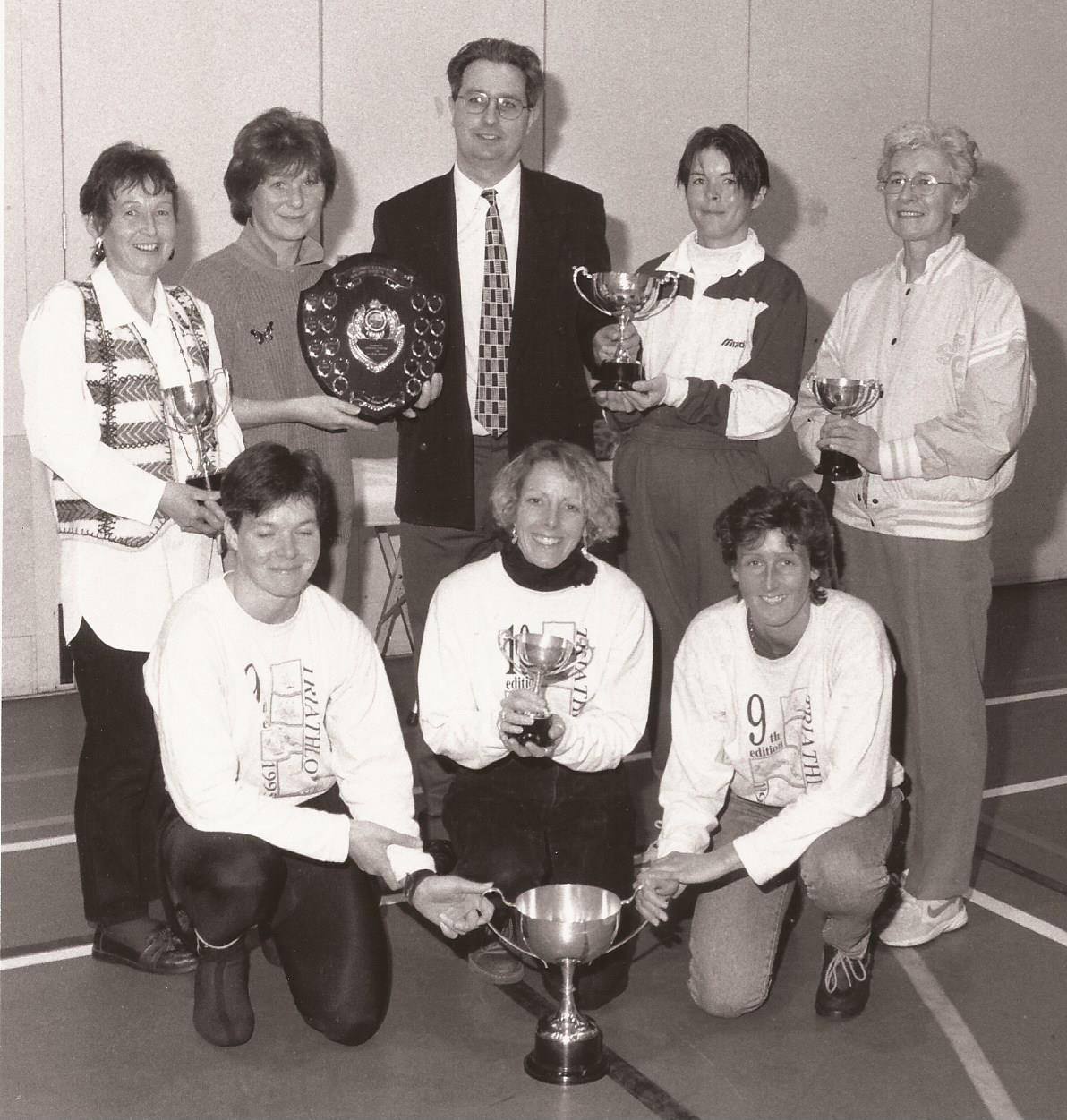
At a 10K Smokies race in 1996 – Thomson is in the back row, second from the right

Thomson raced a lot, particularly in Scotland, and this included shorter distance road races, track races and cross country races. Between 1993 and 1995, she won several Scottish half marathons: Glen Clova three times, Inverness and St Andrews. In March 1995, she finished second in the Bath Half Marathon in a personal best time of 76:06. She was selected to represent Great Britain at the IAAF 1995 World Championships Half Marathon, held on 1 October in Montbéliard, France. Thomson finished 48th in an all-time personal best of 75:48.

Thomson was the overall Scottish masters cross country champion five times between 1994 and 2000.

In 1998, she became the first and only woman to run a leg of the Edinburgh to Glasgow Relay race.

In 1999, she was selected to represent Scotland in the World Mountain Running Trophy in Mount Kinabalu Park, Sabah. She finished 22nd in the 7.8-kilometre race and was part of the bronze medal-winning team. It was the first time the Scottish women's team had won a medal in the fifteen-year history of the event.

=== Ultramarathon career ===
On 2 August 1992, Thomson took part in her first ultramarathon race, the 36-mile Two Bridges race in Scotland, winning in 4:38:51. She won the race again in 1993 and in 1994 when she set a new course record of 4:06:45 which remained unbeaten. In April 1993, Thomson ran her first 100-kilometre race at Greenwich, completing the distance in 8:36:53, a new Scottish track record. In June 1993, she completed over 79 miles in a 24-hour road race in Brechin. On the strength of these performances she was selected to represent Great Britain at the IAU 100 km World Championships at Torhout in Belgium on 7–8 August 1993. Thomson finished ninth in 8:12:05 and was part of the silver medal-winning team along with Carolyn Hunter-Rowe (1st) and Hilary Walker (5th). She was selected again for the 1994 Championships held in June at Lake Saroma in Japan. She finished second. Her time of 7:42:17 was a British record and placed her eighth on the world all-time list.

On 2 April 1994, Thomson competed for the first time in the Two Oceans Marathon, a 56-kilometre road race in South Africa. She finished fifth and was first in the v35 masters age category. She returned in 1996 and 1997, finishing third and fourth respectively.

=== End of competitive racing career ===
The Mumbai Marathon in 2004 was Thomson's last marathon. In 2005, she competed in four Scottish half marathons, winning two of them, and in some shorter races. This marked the end of her competitive racing career.

== Awards ==
In 1994, Runner's World magazine named Trudi Thomson "Veteran Woman Runner of the Year". The following year, she received the John Jewell Award from the Road Runners Club.
