= Kenny Stuart =

British distance runner

Kenny Stuart (born 25 February 1957 in Penrith) is a former fell and road runner from Threlkeld in the Lake District.

Early in his career, when there was still a split between professional and amateur fell racing, Stuart competed in professional races, converting to amateur status in 1982. His first full amateur season in 1983 was marked by close competition with John Wild who had won the previous year's championship. Stuart won the last 1983 championship race at Thieveley Pike, thereby becoming British champion.

Stuart was also British champion in 1984 and 1985 and among the course records he set in those years were 1:02:18 at Skiddaw, 1:25:34 at Ben Nevis, 1:02:29 at Snowdon, and 3:20:57 at the Ennerdale Horseshoe, all of which still stand. In 1985 he won the short race at the inaugural World Mountain Running Cup in Italy. Kenny married fellow fell runner Pauline Haworth in 1985.

In 1986, Stuart turned his attention to road running and won his debut marathon that year at Glasgow in 2:14:03. He went on to set his best marathon time of 2:11:36 at Houston in 1989 but his career was curtailed by increasing allergy and virus problems.

His life story is told in Steve Chilton's 'Running Hard: the story of a rivalry' (Dingwall, 2017).

== See also ==
- Pauline Stuart
