= Arlene Pieper =

American marathon runner (1930–2021)

Arlene on the day she became the first woman to officially finish a marathon in the United States, in her race attire

Arlene Pieper Stine (born Arlene Val Richter; 18 March 1930 – 11 February 2021) became the first woman to officially finish a marathon in the United States, at 29 years old in 1959, when she finished the Pikes Peak Marathon in Manitou Springs, Colorado. Her daughter Katherine, 9 years old, also ran in 1959 and became the youngest competitor at the time to finish the race to the summit of a mountain that was part of the marathon, and the first female runner to reach the summit that year, but did not finish the whole marathon.

Arlene finished the marathon with a time of 9 hours and 16 minutes. During it she did not eat and drank water from a stream. A few days later she lost all her toenails due to the conditions of the race and her shoes. In an interview years later with The Gazette, she stated, "That mountain is something else. Once was enough."

She did the marathon to promote the all-female gym she and her husband owned in Colorado Springs, called Arlene's Health Studio.

After spending four years in Colorado, she and her husband returned to California, where she had lived as a teenager and where they had run gyms for exercise guru Harold Zinkin. They were also acquainted with exercise guru Jack LaLanne and Arnold Schwarzenegger.

Arlene was unaware of the groundbreaking nature of her marathon until she was contacted by the President of the Pikes Peak Marathon, Ron Llegan, in 2009. Llegan began his search for her in the early 2000s but found it difficult to find her due to her relocations over time as well as her three marriages. Llegan eventually ran an ad in a local newspaper offering money as a reward for finding her, after which genealogist Linda Vixie began searching and was able to find Arlene and tell her that she was the first woman to complete an authorized marathon in the United States. When Arlene was asked about her reaction when she found out about her accomplishment in an interview with WBUR, she stated, “It just -- just blew me away-I said, 'I'm the first?"

She served as the official starter for the Pikes Peak Marathon in 2009, and hung the Pikes Peak Marathon medal around the neck of the 2009 women's winner, who credited her win to Arlene's inspiration. Afterward Arlene attended the Pikes Peak Marathon every year until at least 2013 as part of the ceremonies.

Arlene died on February 11, 2021, at age 90.

== Personal life ==
Arlene was married to Wallen Pieper, Eddie Garza, and Richard Stine, with all of those marriages ending in divorce. She was the mother of four children.

== Honors ==
In 2014, she was named as one of the Heroes of Running by Runner's World.

In 2016, she was inducted into the Colorado Springs Sports Hall of Fame.

In 2019, a group of women honored Arlene a week before the Pikes Peak Marathon by running up Pikes Peak while wearing white shorts, white hats and white shirts, which was the same outfit Arlene wore when she ran the marathon in 1959.
