= Chuck Smead =

American long-distance runner

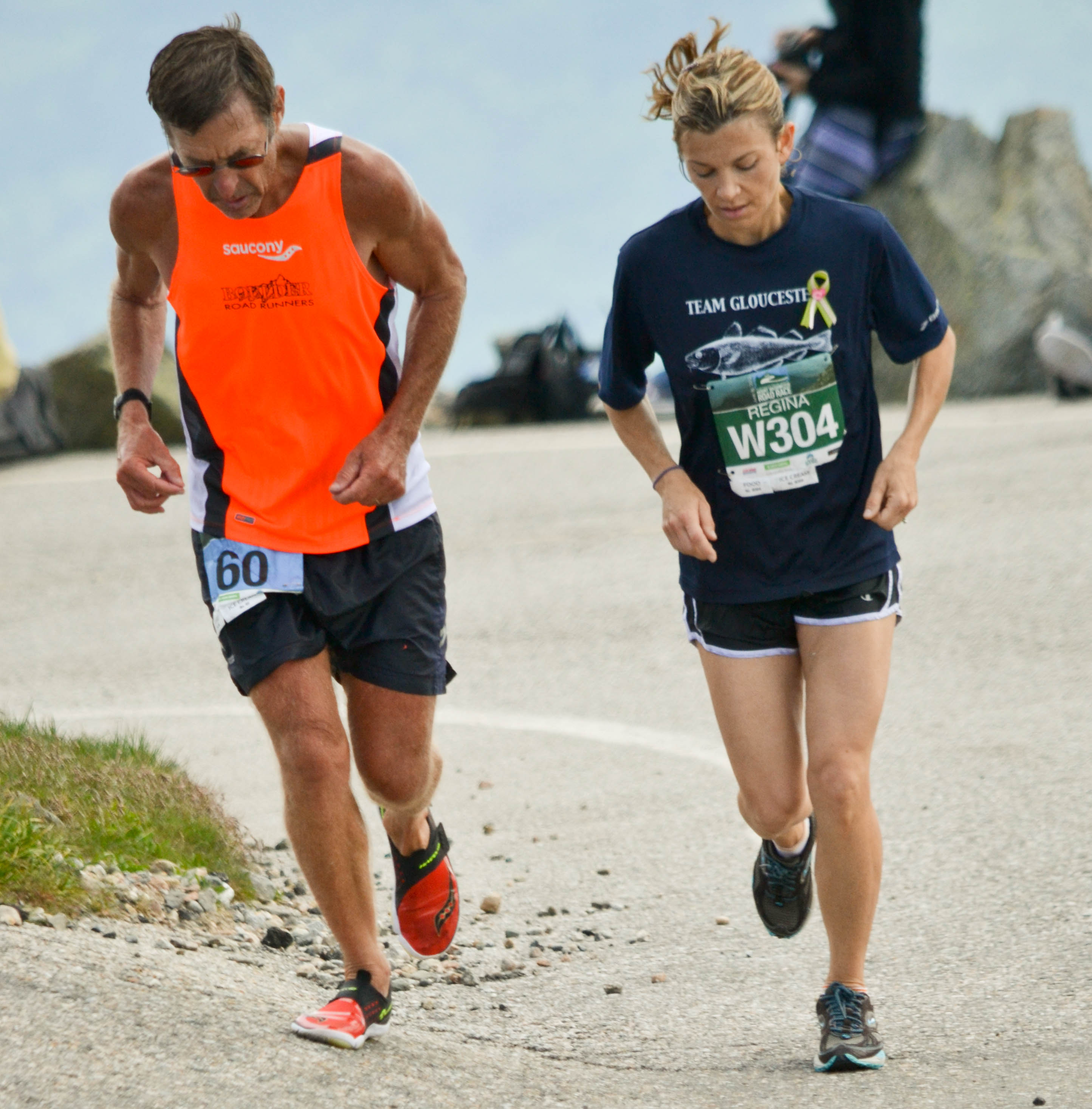
- Chuck Smead (left) at 2012 Mount Washington Road Race

Personal information
- Born: August 4, 1951 (age 74)
Medal record
Men's Athletics
Representing the United States
Pan American Games
Silver medal – second place	1975 Mexico City	Marathon

Charles Smead (born August 4, 1951) is an American long-distance runner, who made his mark on the sport by taking second in the Marathon at the 1975 Pan American Games in Mexico City.

Originally from Santa Paula High School in Santa Paula, California, where he was an outstanding two-miler, taking second place at the prestigious Arcadia Invitational in 1968.

He continued to excel in long distance at Humboldt State University, where he won the NCAA Division II 6 mile/10000 metre Championship twice. In 1972 he began a string of three straight wins in the famous Pikes Peak Marathon, he added a fourth victory in 1976. He has completed the race six times, the most recent as a 57-year-old. He also won the Avenue of the Giants Marathon in 1974 In 1980, he was runner up at the Chicago Marathon.

In the 1970s he was one of the early luminaries of ultramarathoning, yet as a Senior athlete he is not above sprinting 100 metres. He was twice ranked in the United States top ten in the marathon. He continues to be active, winning the M60 division of the 2012 USA Masters 5 km Cross Country Championships in October 2012.

Smead has been credited with spreading an interest in European mountain races among American runners.
