= Brandy Erholtz =

American mountain runner

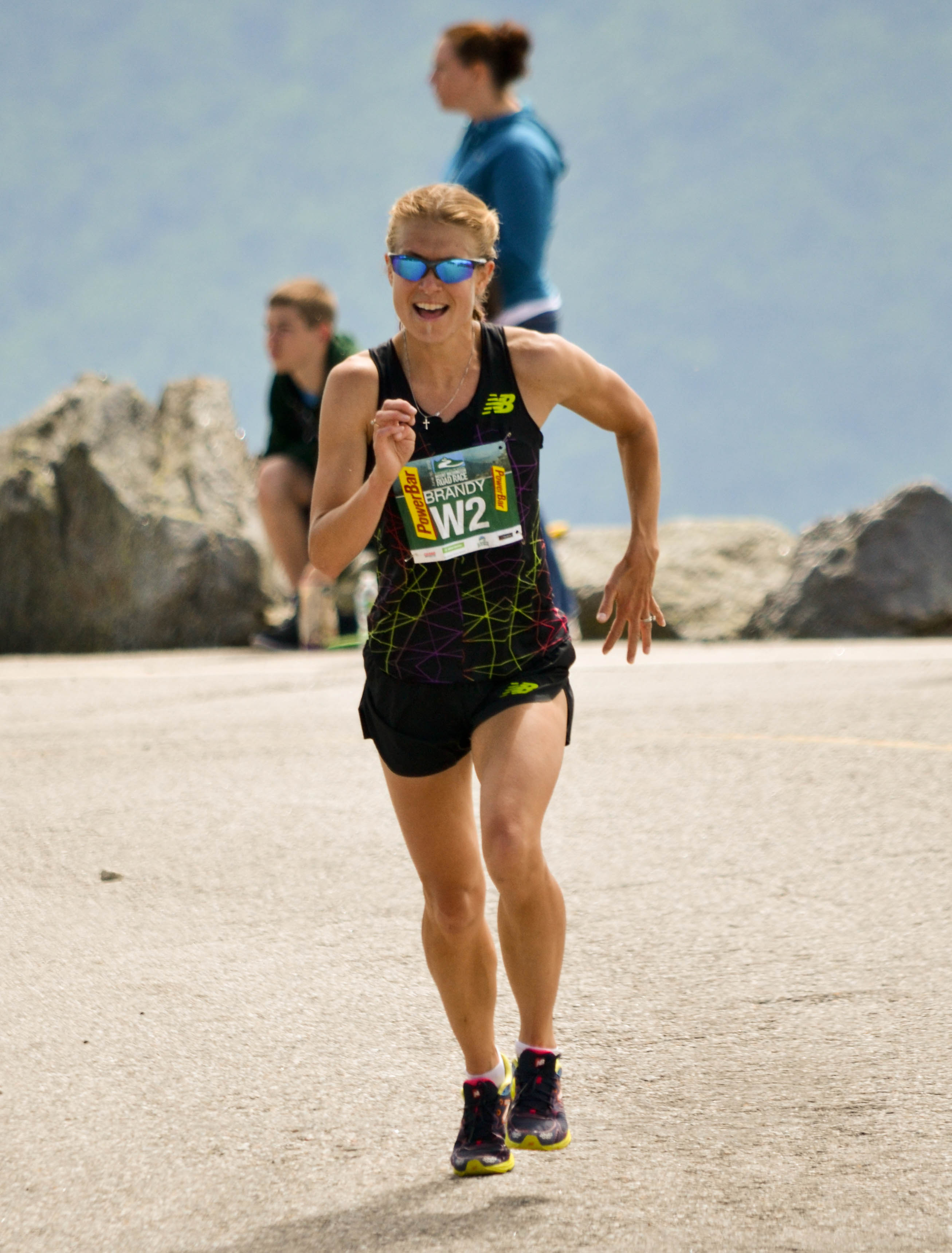

Personal information
- Full name: Brandy Griffith Erholtz
- Born: August 22, 1977 (age 48) International Falls, Minnesota, United States

Sport
- Country: United States
- Sport: Sport of athletics; Mountain running
- Event: Long-distance running

Achievements and titles
- Personal best: Half marathon: 1:19:31 (2007)
Medal record
Mountain running
Event	1st	2nd	3rd
World Championships (team)	0	1	0
World LD Championships (individual)	2	0	1
Total	2	1	1

Brandy Erholtz (née Griffith, born August 22, 1977) is a former American female mountain runner, world champion at the World Long Distance Mountain Running Championships (2010).

== Biography ==
Erholtz won others three medals (two gold) with the national team at the World Long Distance Mountain Running Championships.

She won twice Mount Washington Road Race (2008 and 2009) and three times the NACAC Mountain Running Championships (2010. 2012, 2014).
