= South American Mountain Running Championships =

- Sport: Mountain running
- Founded: 2004
- Continent: South America (CONSUDATLE)

The South American Mountain Running Championships (Spanish: Campeonatos Sudamericanos de Carreras de Montaña) is an annual Mountain running competition organized by CONSUDATLE for athletes representing the countries of its member associations. The event was established in 2006.

== Editions ==
	Year	City	Country	Date
I	2006	Tunja, Boyacá	Colombia	August 19
II	2007	Caracas	Venezuela	August 12
III	2008	Caleu, Chacabuco	Chile	July 27
IV	2009	Quito	Ecuador	August 1
V	2010	Mendoza	Argentina	July 18
VI	2011	Caracas	Venezuela	August 7
VII	2012	Aratoca, Santander	Colombia	August 11
VIII	2013	Cajamarca, Cajamarca	Peru	July 21

== Results ==
Complete results were published.

== See also ==
- World Mountain Running Championships
- European Mountain Running Championships
- NACAC Mountain Running Championships
- World Long Distance Mountain Running Championships
- Commonwealth Mountain and Ultradistance Running Championships
