= Erica Larson =

American distance runner

Erica Larson Baron (born August 11, 1971) is a chemist at the Los Alamos National Laboratory and a champion mountain runner. She has won the Pikes Peak marathon on five occasions, more than any other woman since the event's inception in 1959.

She was raised in Fond du Lac, Wisconsin, the daughter of two music teachers, before enrolling at Marquette University in Milwaukee, Wisconsin. After graduating with a Bachelor's degree in chemistry, she earned her doctorate at the University of Kansas aged 27, before moving to Los Alamos, New Mexico. The city, at over 7,001 ft above sea level, offers an extensive network of nearby trails which Larson frequents while training. On August 28, 2005, she married fellow scientist and runner Miles Baron, who won the Bandelier marathon in New Mexico for three straight years until the race was cancelled in 2005.

After participating in the Pikes Peak ascent in 1994 and 1998, Larson won the "up and down" marathon at her first attempt in 1999, and repeated this result in each of the following three years. She was runner-up to Angela Mudge in 2003, but regained the top step on the podium with her fifth win overall in 2004, when the Scottish runner did not return to defend her title. Her preparations for the 50th-anniversary marathon in 2005 were curtailed by a calf muscle injury and strep throat, but she reversed her earlier decision to withdraw, saying "I'd be really bummed out if I didn't run it this year". Despite her health issues she still managed to finish third.

She is also a two-time winner of the Leadville Marathon, and finished 34th at the U.S. Women's Olympic Marathon Trials in 2004, which she describes as her proudest achievement.
