= Timothy Davies (runner) =

British athlete (born 1977)

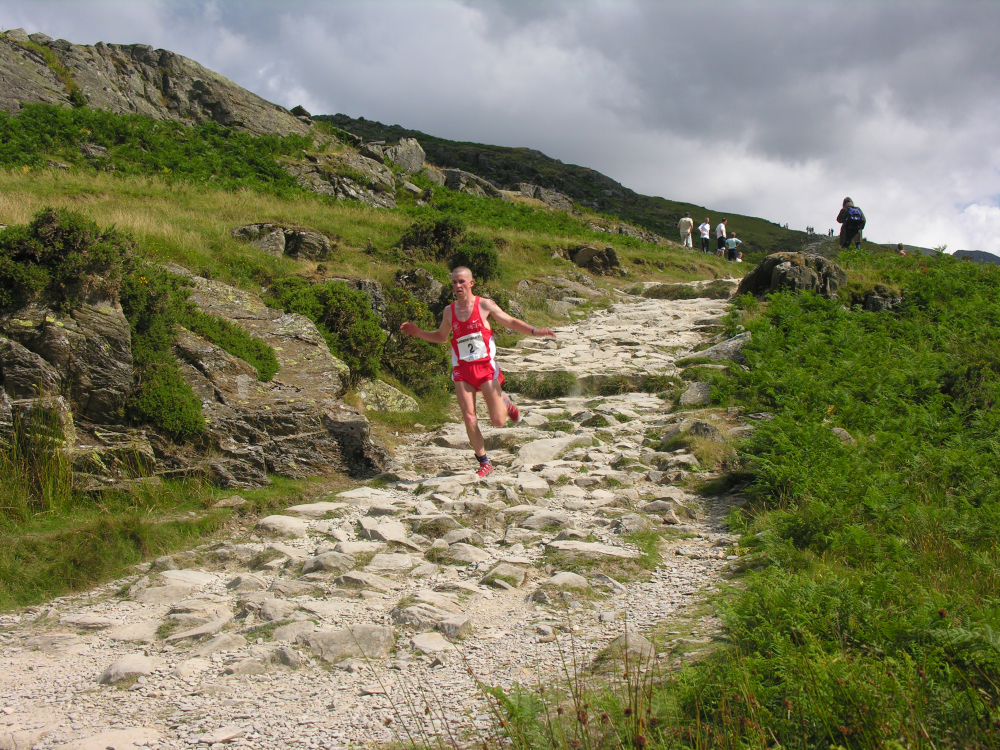
Tim Davies during the 2005 Snowdon Race

Timothy "Tim" Davies (born 1977) is a Welsh athlete who specialises in mountain and fell running.

Born in Welshpool, Wales, Tim was raised into a family with a farming background and was heavily influenced by the hills surrounding him during his childhood. Many of his family run, most notably his brother Andrew Davies.

Davies was fifth in the World Mountain Running Trophy in 2003, also winning a silver medal at the 2004 European Mountain Running Championships in the team event alongside Andi Jones and John Brown. At the European Mountain Running Championships 2006 he finished in seventh position in the individual race, just behind Jones.

Davies is a three-time winner of the Snowdon Race, and became the first Welshman to win it twice in succession. In 2010 he won the British Fell Running Championships.

Tim is a former Royal Marine and runs a farm in Powys, Wales
