= Simon Bailey (runner) =

English runner

Simon Roger Arthur Bailey (born 23 January 1980) is an English runner who has been a national fell running champion several times and who has represented his country at the World Mountain Running Trophy.

He is the son of Roger and Vanessa Bailey of Rushton Spencer near the border between Staffordshire and Cheshire.

Bailey’s potential was noticed when he finished second in the Shutlingsloe Fell Race at the age of fourteen and he was encouraged to focus on fell running by the race winner Dave Neill. As young athletes, Simon and his sister Kate both became national champions in their age groups and represented England in the junior races at the World Mountain Running Trophy in 1999, when Simon finished in fifth place and Kate was the bronze medallist.

As a senior athlete, Simon ran at the World Mountain Running Trophy in 2003, finishing eleventh.

In the 2004 season, Bailey became the youngest man to win both the British and English Fell Running Championships in the same year, when he won five out the eight championship races in which he competed and set course records in three of them. He went on to win the English Championships again in 2005 (jointly with Rob Hope), 2007, 2009, 2012, 2013, 2015 and 2016 and his tally of eight wins is higher than that of any other runner in the history of the competition. He was also the British Open Fell Runners Association champion in 2016.

Bailey finished fourth in the up and down race at the Commonwealth Mountain Running Championships in 2009 and in 2015, he took second place in the over-35 category at the World Masters Mountain Running Championships.

In 2006 he married Kirstin Bailey. Kirstin has also competed in fell running and was the Yorkshire champion in 2002.
