= Tracey Brindley =

British runner

Tracey Brindley (born 25 August 1972) is a British runner who has been a medallist at the World Mountain Running Trophy and a national fell running champion.

Brindley won the individual bronze and a team gold medal at the World Trophy in Girdwood, Alaska, in 2003. She improved her individual result to second place at the 2005 World Trophy which was held in Wellington.

She won the over-35 women's race at the World Masters Mountain Running Championships in 2007 and finished second in the mountain race at the Commonwealth Mountain and Ultradistance Running Championships in 2011.

Domestically, Brindley's fell race wins include the Three Peaks and Snowdon. In 2004, she was both British fell running champion and Scottish Athletics hill running champion.

She has also competed in road running, winning the Morpeth To Newcastle Road Race in 1999 and the Inverness Half Marathon in 2001.
