= Matt Carpenter (runner) =

American ultramarathon runner

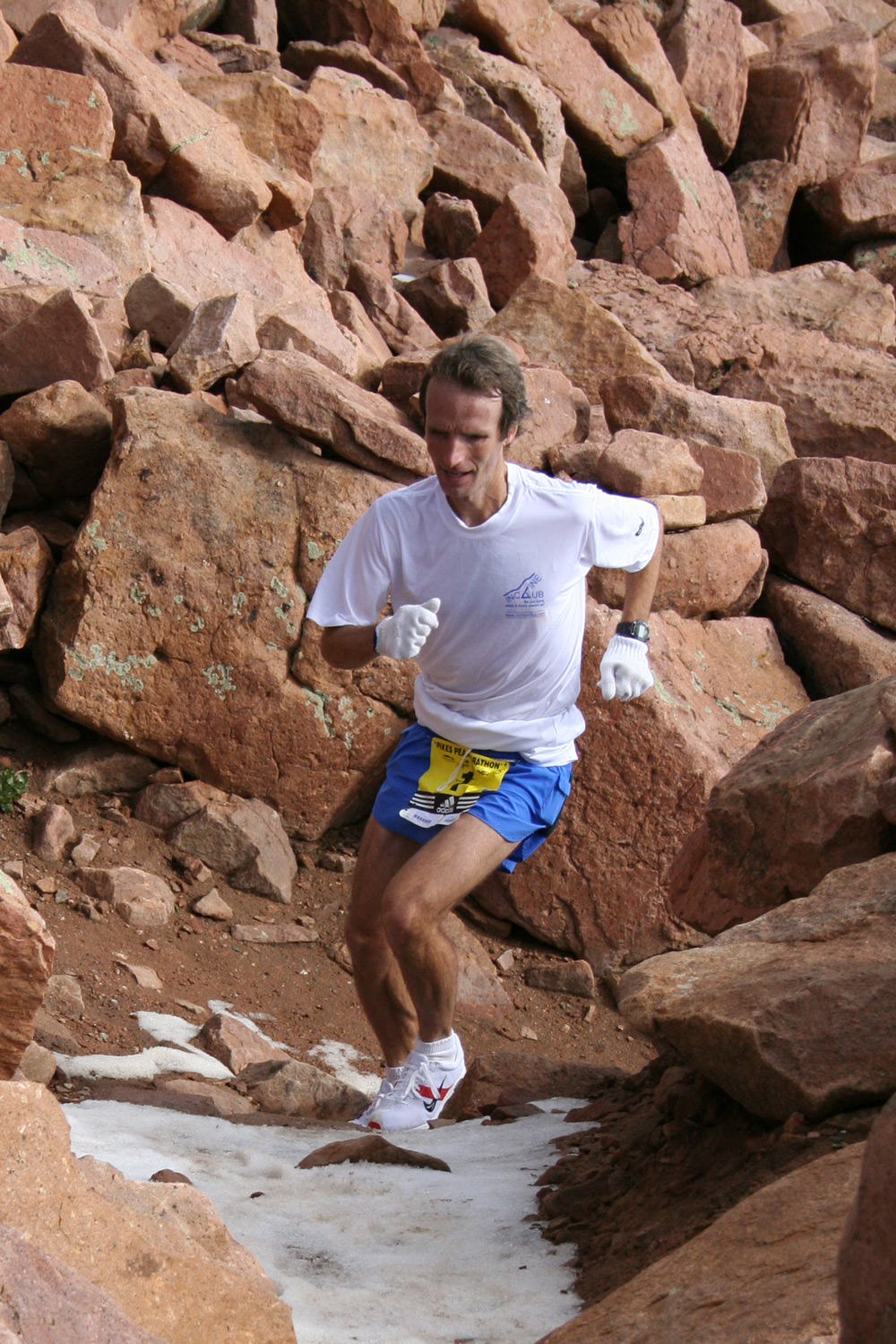
- Matt Carpenter, approaching the summit of Pikes Peak during the 2006 Pikes Peak Marathon. Aged 42, he reached the summit in 2:08:27 on his way to a 3:33:07 win in the Marathon.

Personal information
- Born: July 20, 1964 (age 62) Asheville, North Carolina
- Height: 1.70 m (5 ft 7 in)
- Weight: 55.8 kg (123 lb)

Sport
- Country: United States
- Sport: Ultramarathoner
- Event: high altitude marathons - Trail running

Matthew Edwin Carpenter (born July 20, 1964) is an American Ultramarathoner as a trail runner and in high altitude marathons.

== Early life ==
Carpenter was born in North Carolina, before moving to Kentucky and then Mississippi while in high school. He took up running while living there, because he had "nothing else to do". Over time it became a way to fund his college education, and subsequently an escape from bereavement in the period following the death of his mother.

As a student at the University of Southern Mississippi he frequently visited Colorado, and moved there after graduation, first to Vail in 1987, then to Colorado Springs four years later, before settling in Manitou Springs in 1998.

== Physiology ==
Carpenter stands at 1.70 m (5 ft 7 in) and weighs 55.8 kg (123 lb). In 1990, his VO_{2} max, a measure of the body's ability to intake oxygen, was calculated to be 90.2 during tests at the U.S. Olympic Training Center, the highest they had recorded. This, and his rigorous training regime—he claims to have run daily for over five years between 1997 and his daughter's birth in 2002—are credited as the keys to his enduring success.

== Endorsement and dominance ==
Whenever we race, I know it’s going to be a good competition — unless it’s at high altitude, and then I don’t stand a chance.

— Uli Steidl, long-distance runner and rival of Carpenter, speaking in 2009.

After signing with Fila Skyrunners in 1993, he won either thirteen or fifteen of the seventeen high altitude marathons he entered, setting records at both 14,350 feet (4,370 m) (with a time of 2:52:57) and 17,060 feet (5,200 m) (a time of 3:22:25). Later in his career he moved to ultrarunning, and sustained his previous success, setting course records in the San Juan Solstice 50-mile race in Lake City, Colorado in 2004, and breaking the record for the Leadville Trail 100 race in 2005 by over an hour and a half.

Carpenter has won the Pikes Peak Marathon on twelve occasions, the Vail Hill Climb eight times, the Imogene Pass Run six times, the Barr Trail Mountain Race, Everest SkyMarathon Tibet, and Aspen SkyMarathon five times each, and holds the course record for all of these events. He is also the record holder for running the fastest flat marathons run at altitude at both 14,000 and 17,000 feet. His success in the sport has been so extensive and dominant that he has been compared to Lance Armstrong, and described as "one of the greatest mountain runners of all time".

Carpenter's greatest dominance has been on Pikes Peak. He has won eighteen races; six ascents and twelve marathons, including an unprecedented double, winning both on consecutive days in 2001. On the ascent he holds the age group record for both 40- to 44-year-olds, and 25- to 29-year-olds, and held the overall fastest Ascent record for 30 years with a time of 2:01:06 during the first half of the 1993 marathon. His overall ascent record was bested by 46 seconds at the 2023 Pikes Peak Ascent by Rémi Bonnet, who summited in 2:00:20. In the marathon itself, he holds the record for the 20- to 24-, 25- to 29-, 35- to 39- and 40- to 44-year-old age groups, as well as the outright fastest time of 3:16:39, also in 1993.

In October 2013, Carpenter was the first distance runner inducted into the Colorado Springs Sports Hall of Fame.

== Later life ==
He currently lives with his Brazilian-born wife Yvonne and their daughter Kyla, born in 2002. The couple are both members of the Incline Club, their local trail-running group, and are so dedicated to their sport that their wedding was held during a Sunday morning training run along the Waldo Canyon Trail in February 2000.

Carpenter served on the Manitou Springs City Council 2010-2013. From 2012 to 2023, Carpenter and his wife owned and operated the Colorado Custard Company, a small shop in Manitou Springs, Colorado. He sold the shop in 2024.

Carpenter states he’s never had alcohol, cigarettes, or recreational or performance enhancing drugs and that he’s never consumed caffeine in training or competition.
