= Commonwealth Mountain and Ultra Distance Running Championships =

Fell running tournament

The Commonwealth Mountain and Ultradistance Running Championships, founded in 2009, was a biennial fell running tournament operated by the Commonwealth Games Federation. It had its last edition in 2011.

== Editions ==
Year	Host
2009	Cumbria, England
2011	North Wales, Wales

== See also ==
- World Mountain Running Championships
- European Mountain Running Championships
- World Long Distance Mountain Running Championships
- Commonwealth Mountain and Ultradistance Running Championships
- NACAC Mountain Running Championships
- South American Mountain Running Championships
