= Predigtstuhl =

Predigtstuhl is German for "pulpit", but may also refer to:

== Mountains or hills ==
- Predigtstuhl (Schladming Tauern), 2543 m, in the Schladminger Tauern, Styria
- Predigtstuhl (Wetterstein), also Predigtstein, 2234 m, in the Gaistal, Wettersteingebirge, Tyrol
- Predigtstuhl (Kaiser), 2116 m, in the Wilder Kaiser, Tyrol
- Predigtstuhl (Karwendel), 1920 m, in the Karwendel east of Mittenwald, Bavaria
- A subpeak, 1903 m, of the Rax (mountain range), in Upper Styria on the border with Lower Austria
- Predigtstuhl (Latten Mountains), 1613 m, in the Latten Mountains, Berchtesgaden Alps, south of Bad Reichenhall, Bavaria
- Predigtstuhl, 1562 m, a mountain in Bavaria, see Blauberge
- Predigtstuhl (Chiemgau Alps), 1494 m, in the Chiemgau Alps
- Predigtstuhl (Lower Bavaria), 1024 m, in the Bavarian Forest, Bavaria
- Predigtstuhl (Nöchling), 520 m, near Nöchling in the Strudengau, Upper and Lower Austria
- Gallitzinberg, Wilhelminenberg, 449 m, hill in Vienna-Ottakring
- Predigtstuhl (Dunkelstein Forest), ~440 m, near Göttweig in the Dunkelstein Forest, Lower Austria
- Predigtstuhl (Wieningerberg), 718 m, the highest mountain of the Thaya-Highland near Dietmanns, Lower Austria

== See also ==
- Preikestolen, Norwegian for Predigtstuhl, hill in Norway
- Predigtstuhl Cable Car
