= Großgmain =

- Municipality
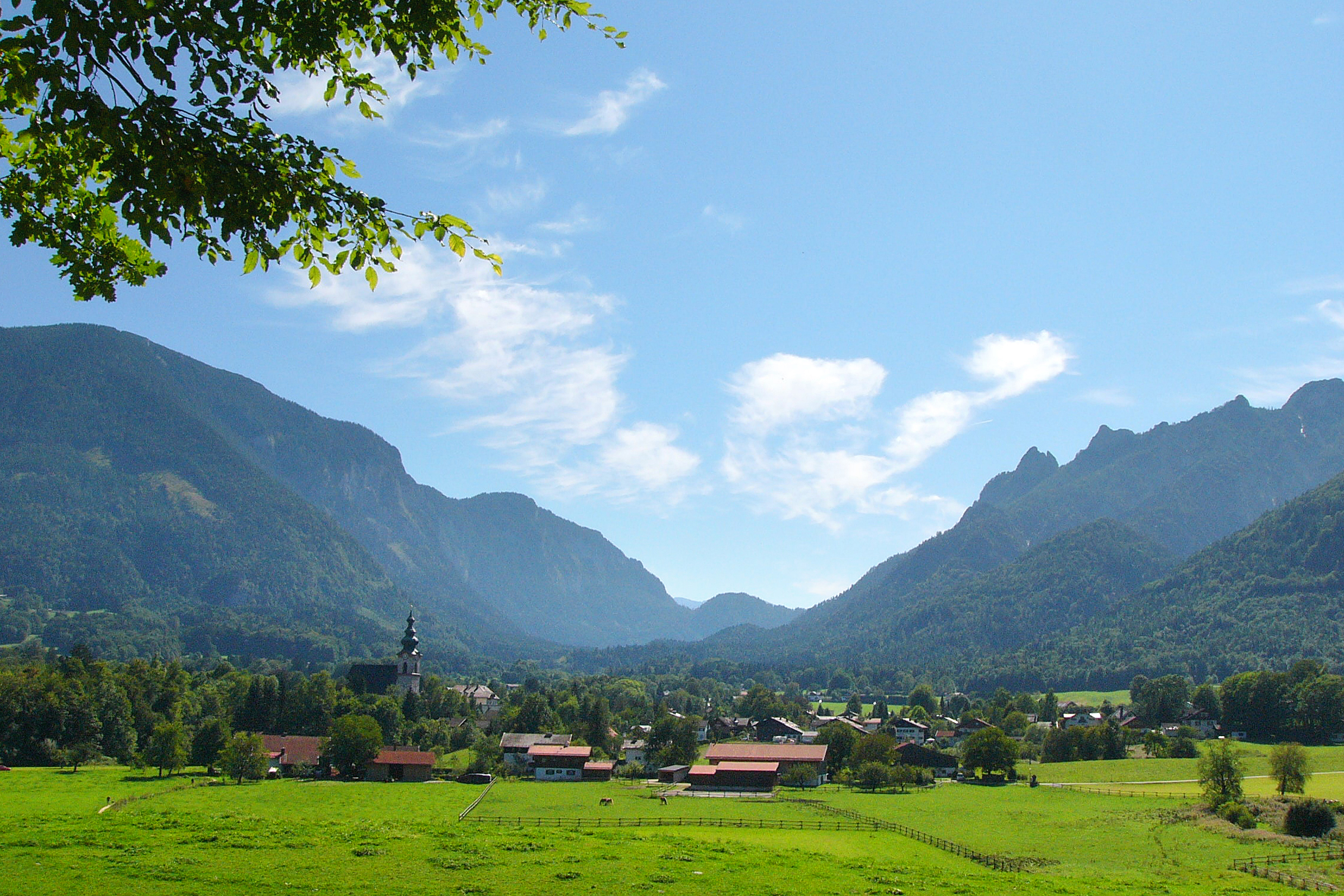

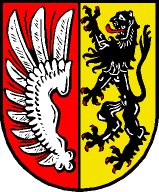
- Coat of arms

- Location within Austria
- Coordinates: 47°43′30″N 12°54′31″E
- Country: Austria
- State: Salzburg
- District: Salzburg-Umgebung

Government
  - Mayor: Sebastian Schönbuchner (ÖVP)

Area
  - Total: 22.82 km^{2} (8.81 sq mi)
- Elevation: 520 m (1,710 ft)

Population (2018-01-01)
  - Total: 2,615
  - Density: 114.6/km^{2} (296.8/sq mi)
- Time zone: UTC+1 (CET)
  - Summer (DST): UTC+2 (CEST)
- Postal code: 5084
- Area code: 06247
- Vehicle registration: SL
- Website: www.grossgmain.salzburg.at

Großgmain is a municipality in the district of Salzburg-Umgebung in the state of Salzburg in Austria.

== Geography ==
Großgmain lies in the Salzburg Flachgau region in the northern foothills of the Untersberg massif, directly on the border with Bayerisch Gmain in the German state of Bavaria. The Austrian-German border runs along the Weißbach creek, a tributary of the Saalach river.

== History ==
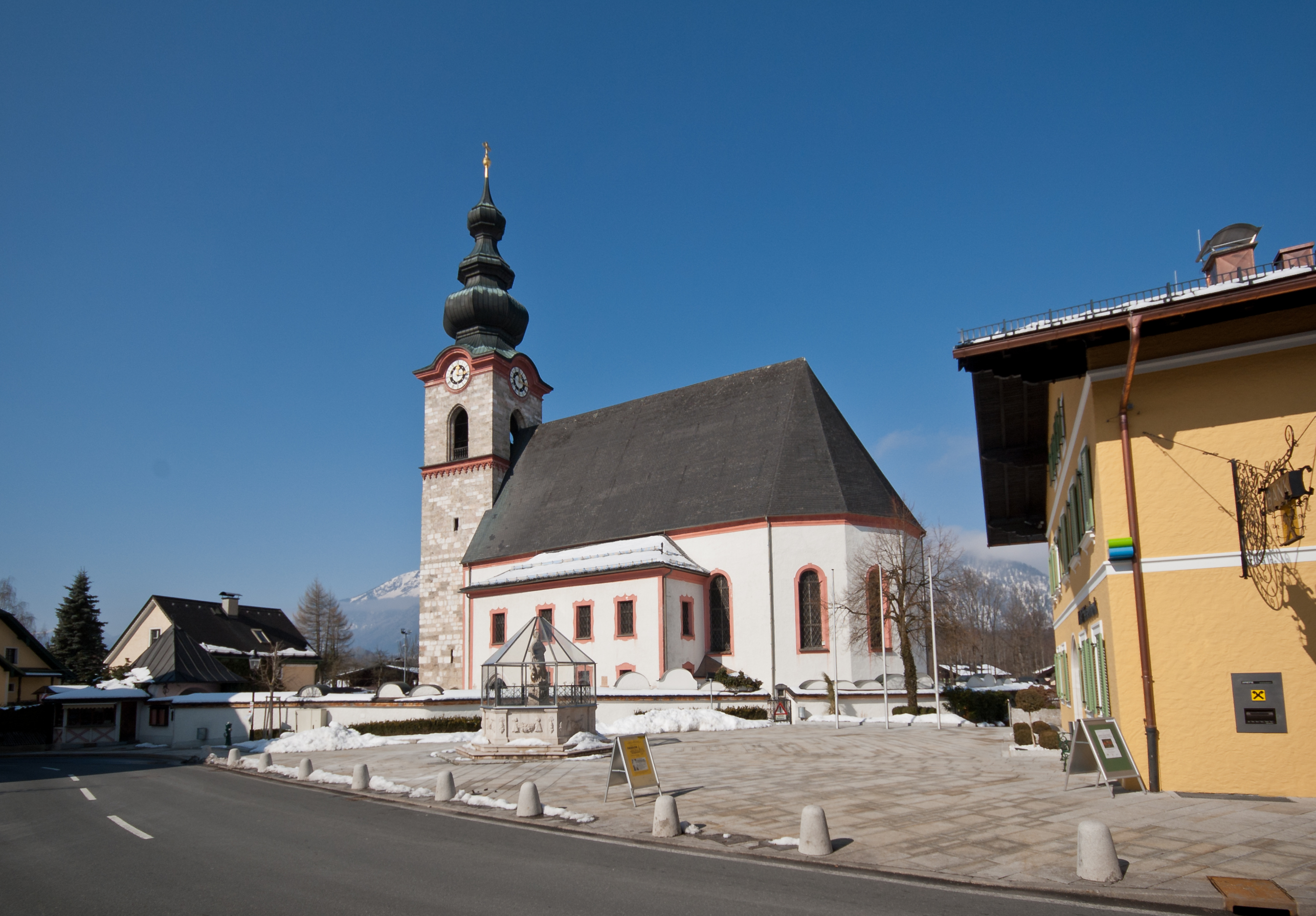
Parish church

The Gmain area, first mentioned in a 712 deed of donation issued by Duke Theodbert of Bavaria, is an old settlement ground, a fertile plain stretching along the northern rim of the Berchtesgaden Alps. Archaeological findings date back to the Bronze Age; in the Middle Ages it became the centre of the dominions held by the Bavarian counts of Plain, who had the Plainburg erected as their residence.

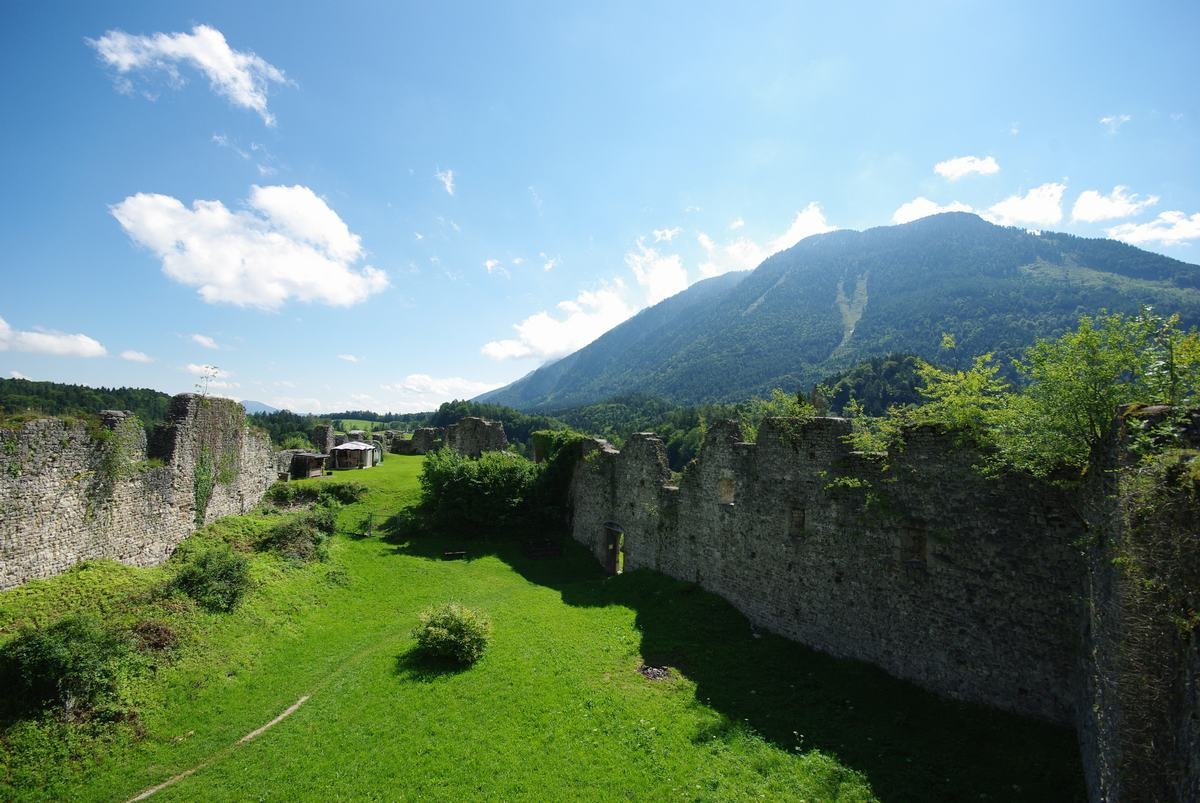
Ruins of the Plainburg castle

Plainburg is an 11th-century ruined castle in the town.

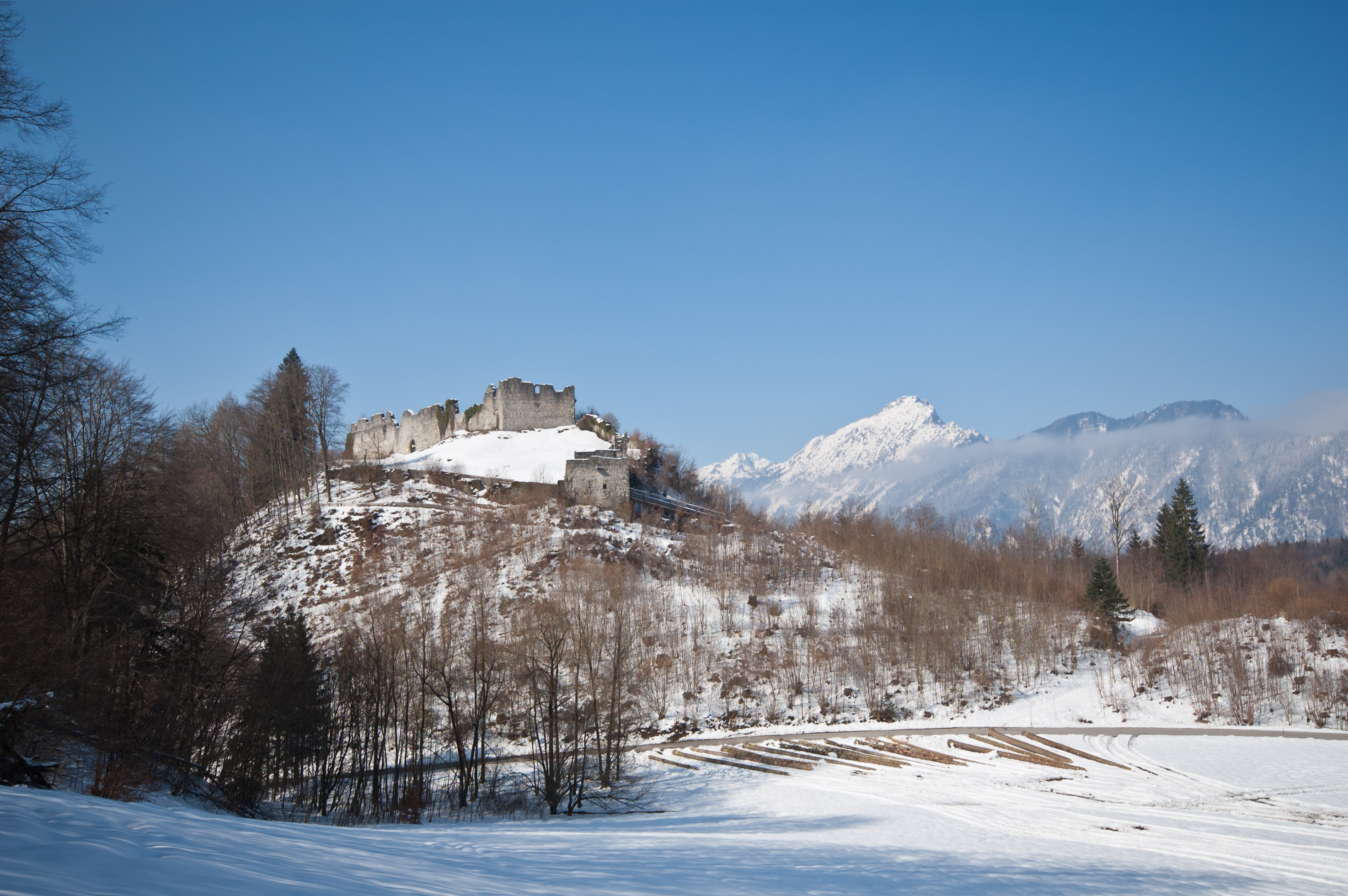
Plainburg in the winter

When the archbishops of Salzburg achieved the status of prince-bishops, the Weißbach became the western border of the immediate estates in the region. Though the villages of Großgmain and Bayerisch Gmain were part of different dominions, the sense of a common bond among the local population has been preserved to this day.

In 1938, it was annexed by Germany, and in April 1941, the Oflag 78 prisoner-of-war camp was established in the town. However, it was relocated to Hohenfels, Bavaria.

== Politics ==
Seats in the municipal assembly (Gemeinderat) as of the 2014 local elections:

- Austrian People's Party (ÖVP): 10
- Social Democratic Party of Austria (SPÖ): 3
- Freedom Party of Austria (FPÖ): 3
- The Greens – The Green Alternative: 3

== Notable people ==
- Ilse Aichinger (born 1921), writer, lived in Großgmain from 1963 to 1981
- Cesar Bresgen (1913–1988), composer, lived in Großgmain from 1956
- Lolita (1931–2010), singer, lived in Großgmain until her death
- Josef Meinrad (1913–1996), actor, died in Großgmain
