= Dreisesselberg =

Dreisesselberg may refer to:

- Dreisesselberg (Bavarian Forest), a mountain of Bavaria, Germany, in the Bavarian Forest
- Dreisesselberg (Lattengebirge), a mountain of Bavaria, Germany
