= Weißbach (Lattengebirge) =

River in Bavaria, Germany

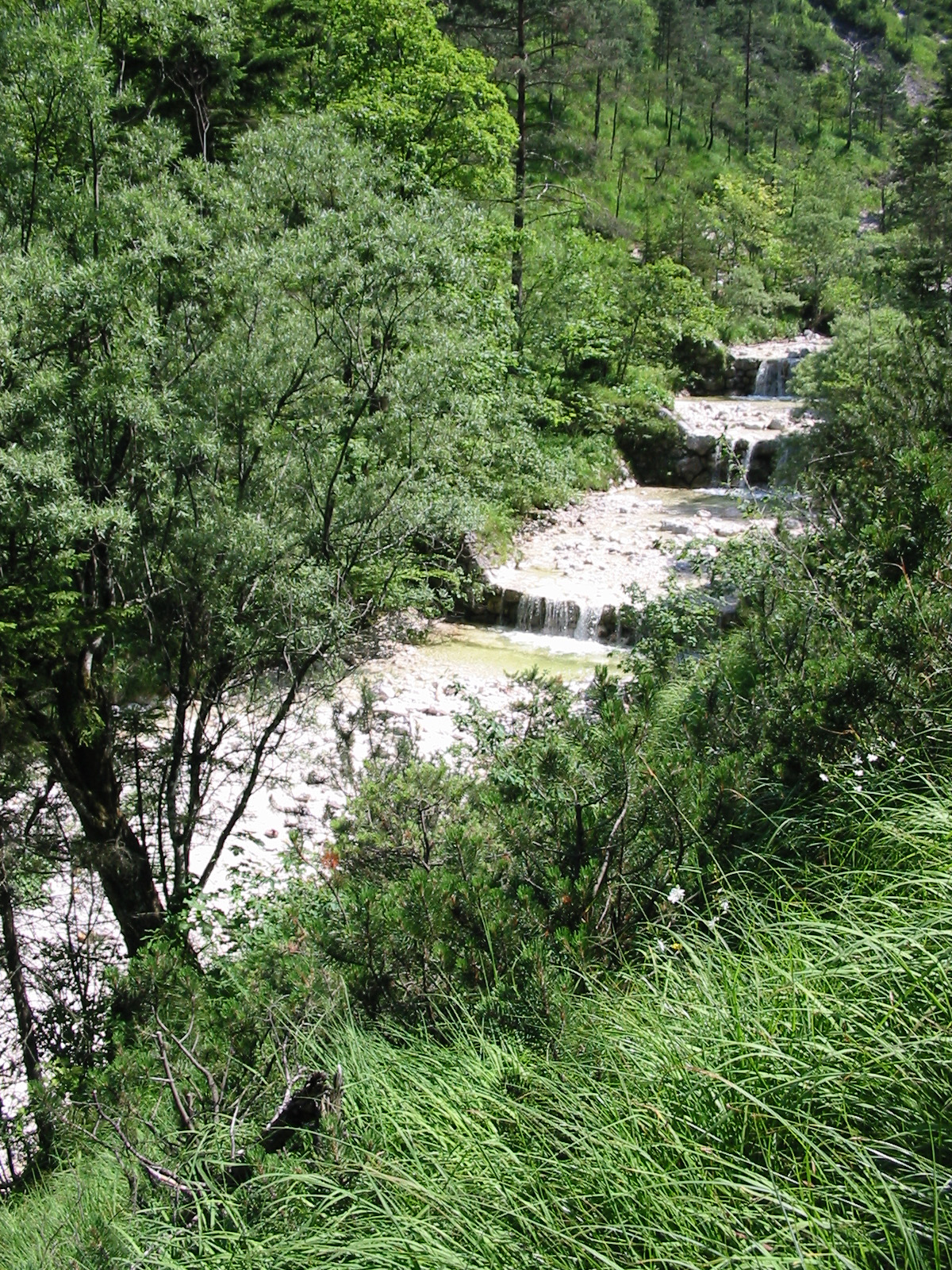
- The Weißbach with check dams

Location
- Countries: Austria and Germany
- States: Salzburg and Bavaria

Physical characteristics
- Source
  - location: At the northern slope of the mountain Dreisesselberg
  - coordinates: 47.7000°N 12.9046°E
- Mouth
  - location: Grabenbach
  - coordinates: 47.7502°N 12.9082°E
- Length: 7.4 km (4.6 mi)

Basin features
- Progression: Grabenbach→ Saalach→ Salzach→ Inn→ Danube→ Black Sea

Weißbach is a river of Bavaria, Germany and Salzburg, Austria. Its source lies at the northern slope of the Dreisesselberg which is one of the Latten Mountains. Part of its course forms a section of the Austria–Germany border. It discharges in Weißbach, a district of Bad Reichenhall, into the Grabenbach, which itself discharges into the Saalach.

== See also ==
- List of rivers of Bavaria
