= Predigtstuhl (Latten Mountains) =

Mountain in Bavaria, Germany

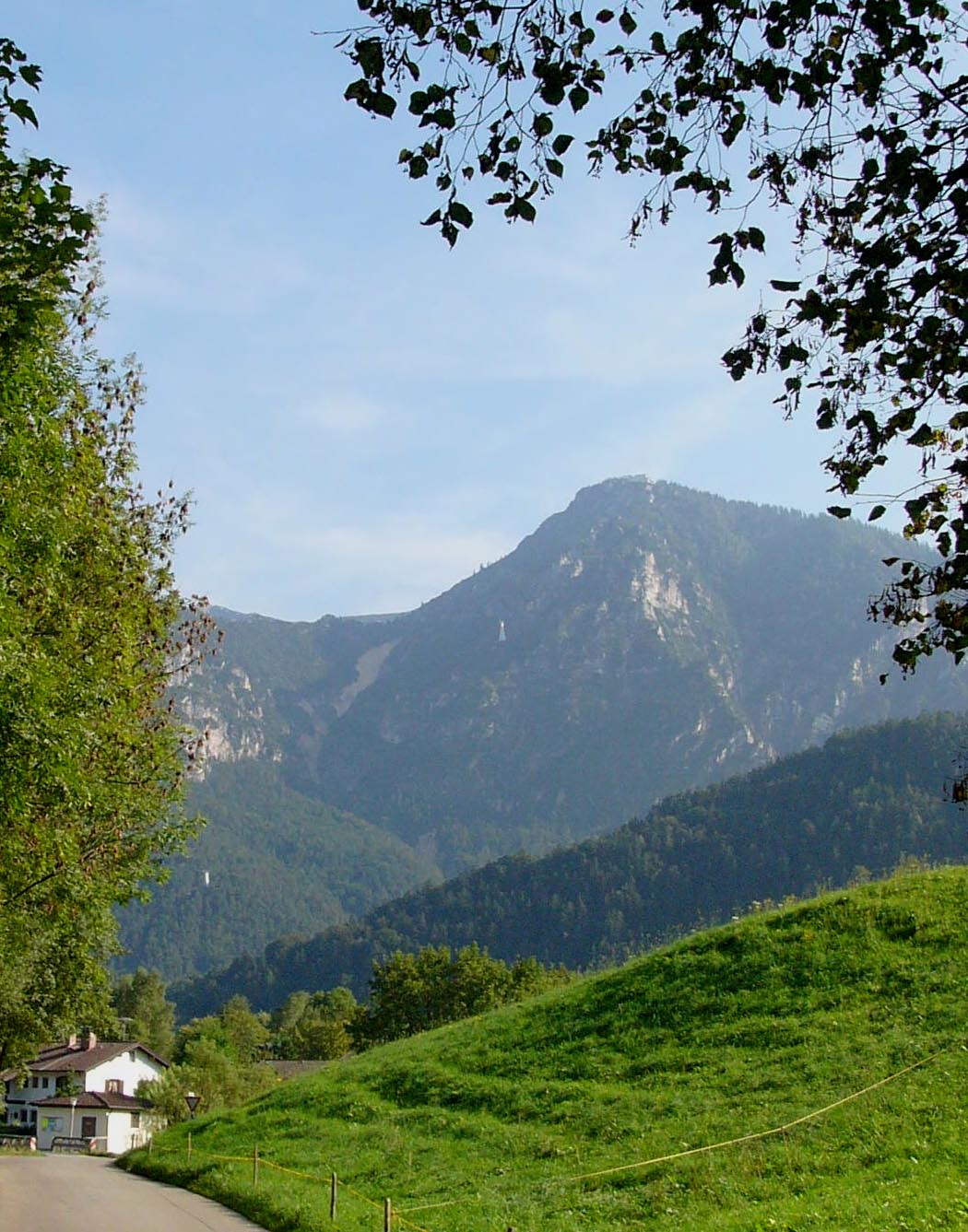
- View from Bad Reichenhall

Highest point
- Elevation: 1,613 m (5,292 ft)
- Prominence: 64 m (210 ft)
- Coordinates: 47°41′50″N 12°52′43″E

Geography
- Location within Alps
- Location: Bavaria, Germany
- Parent range: Berchtesgaden Alps

The Predigtstuhl (German for "pulpit") is a mountain, 1,613 m (5,292 ft) above sea level (NHN), in the Lattengebirge range of the Berchtesgaden Alps. It is located about 2.5 km south of the town of Bad Reichenhall and one of the few mountains in the area that is accessible by cable car, making it a popular tourist attraction.

== Infrastructure ==
The Predigtstuhl was opened up for tourism in 1928 with the construction of the Predigtstuhl Cable Car which runs from Bad Reichenhall to the summit, as well as a restaurant and a hotel near the cable car's top station. An alpine hut serving food is located at nearby Schlegelmulde. The hotel has been closed for renovations since 2014.

== Activities ==
The summit can be reached on foot from the surrounding towns of Bad Reichenhall, Bayerisch Gmain and Schneizlreuth. It is commonly used as a starting point for hikes to mountains deeper in the Lattengebirge such as the Dreisesselberg and the Karkopf.

There are paragliding launch sites in the Schlegelmulde and on the neighboring Hochschlegel. The Bad Reichenhall Paragliding Club recommends them only to experienced pilots due to the difficult wind situation.

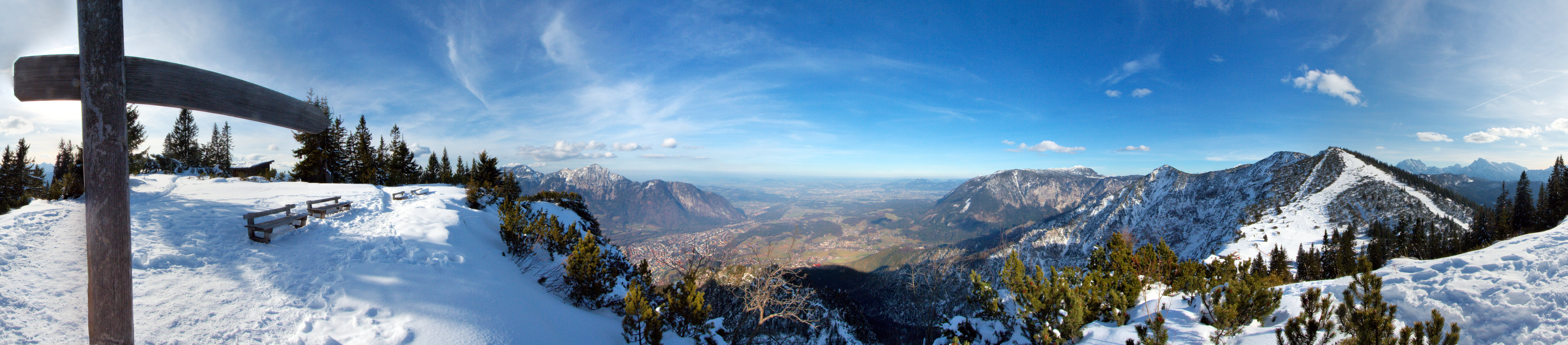
Panorama from the summit
