= Bayerisch =

Bayerisch may refer to the following places in Bavaria, Germany:

- Bayerisch Eisenstein, municipality in the Regen district
- Bayerisch Gmain, municipality in the district of Berchtesgadener Land
