= David Affengruber =

David Affengruber may refer to:

- David Affengruber (footballer, born 1992), SC Zwettl goalkeeper
- David Affengruber (footballer, born 2001), Fulham defender
