= Claire Waldoff =

German singer (1884–1957)

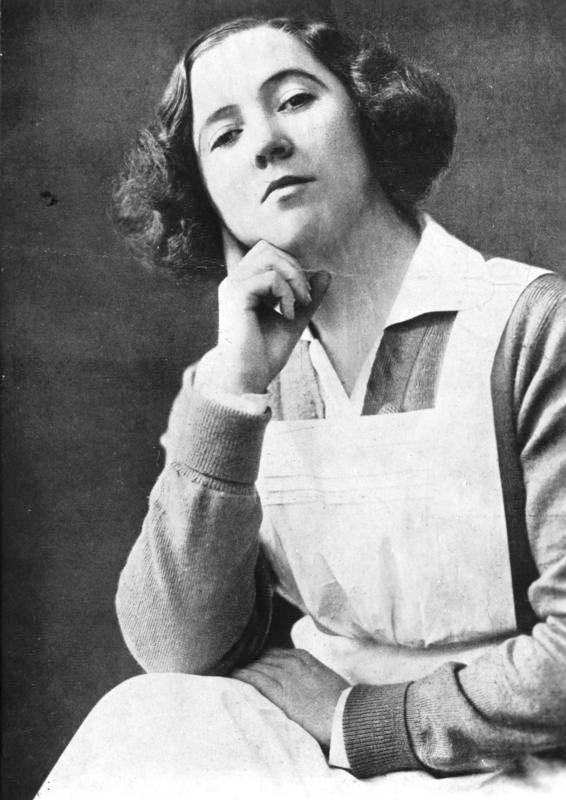

Background information
- Birth name: Clara Wortmann
- Born: 21 October 1884 Gelsenkirchen, Westphalia, Prussia, German Empire
- Died: 22 January 1957 (aged 72) Bad Reichenhall, Bavaria, West Germany
- Genres: Cabaret (Kabarett), Music hall, Operetta, Revue, Schlager
- Occupation(s): Singer, actress
- Instrument: Vocals
- Years active: 1903–1942

Claire Waldoff (21 October 1884 – 22 January 1957), born Clara Wortmann, was a German singer. She was a famous kabarett singer and entertainer in Berlin during the 1910s to the 1930s, chiefly known for performing ironic songs in the Berlin dialect and with lesbian undertones and themes.

== Biography ==
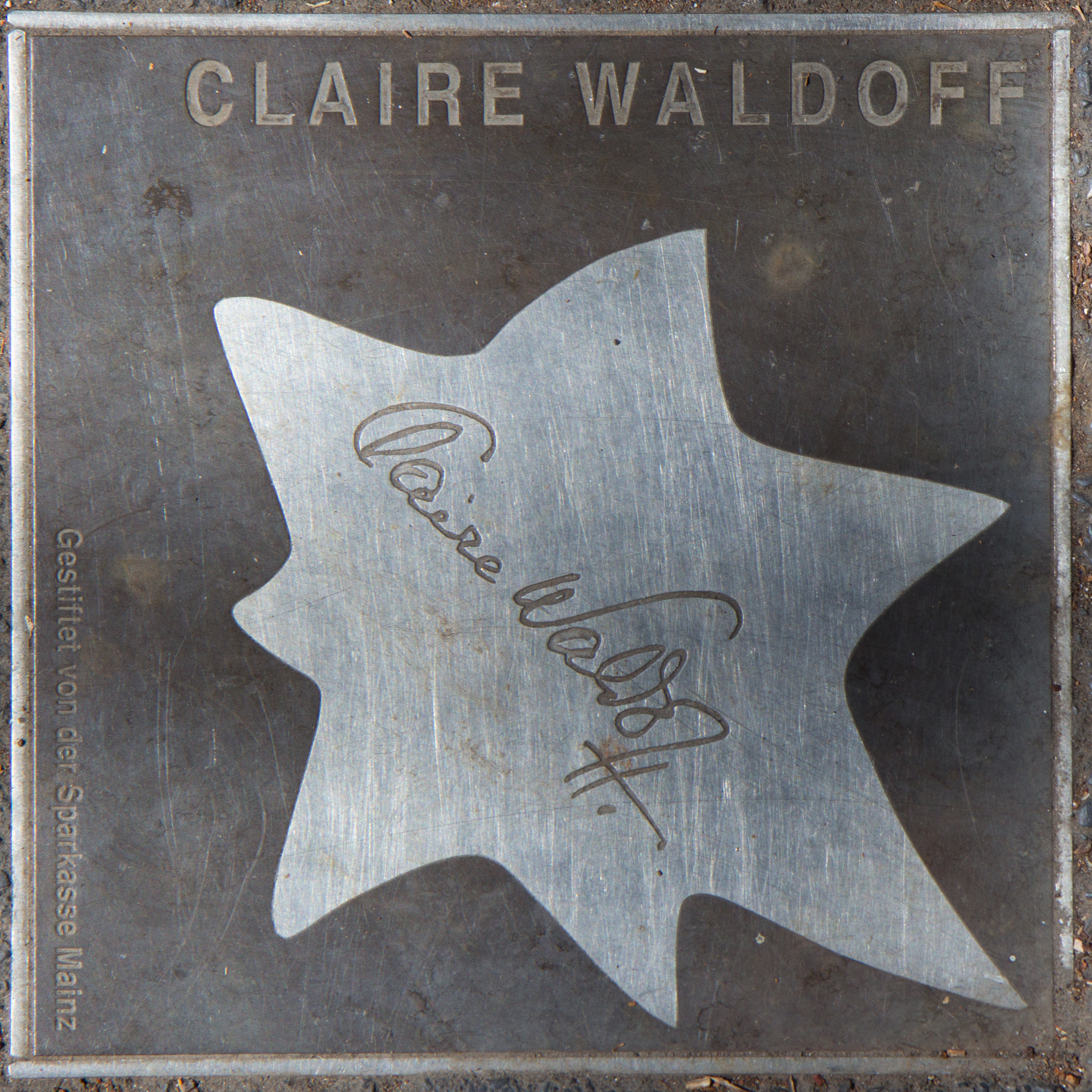
Walk of Fame of Cabaret, Mainz

Wortmann was born the eleventh child of sixteen in Gelsenkirchen, Westphalia, where her parents owned a tavern. After completing Gymnasium school in Hanover, she trained as an actress and chose as her pseudonym Claire Waldoff. In 1903, she got her first theatre jobs in Bad Pyrmont and in Kattowitz (Katowice), Silesia. In 1906, Waldoff went to Berlin, where she performed at the Figaro-Theater on Kurfürstendamm. In 1907, she also began a working as a cabaret singer.

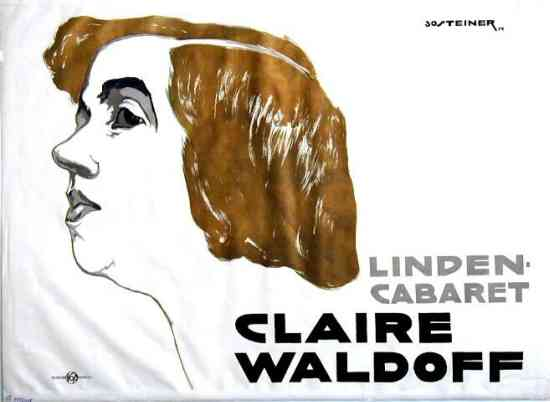
Claire Waldoff poster, 1914

She made her breakthrough when Rudolf Nelson gave her a job at the Roland von Berlin theatre near Potsdamer Platz. Initially planning to perform antimilitarist pieces by Paul Scheerbart in a men's suit, Waldoff had greater success with less offensive catchy songs written by Walter Kollo. During the next several years in German cabaret, she sang at Chat Noir on Friedrichstraße and at the Linden-Cabaret on Unter den Linden. During World War I, when many cabarets were closed, she performed at the Theater am Nollendorfplatz and in Königsberg.

Waldoff's success reached its peak in the Weimar Republic era of the 1920s. She was known for singing her songs in distinctive Berliner slang, attired in a shirt with a tie and the fashionable crop hairstyle, cursing and smoking cigarettes on stage. From 1924 she performed at the two great Berlin varieté theatres, Scala and Wintergarten, sang together with young Marlene Dietrich, and had her songs played on the radio as well as released on record. Her repertoire included around 300 original songs.

Waldoff lived together with her significant other Olga "Olly" von Roeder (12 June 1886 – 11 July 1963) until her death. The couple lived happily in Berlin during the 1920s. Part of the queer scene, they associated with celebrities like Anita Berber in the milieu around Damenklub Pyramide near Nollendorfplatz. Waldoff was also close friends with Kurt Tucholsky and Heinrich Zille.

During the Great Depression in 1932, Waldoff performed in an event hosted by the Communist Rote Hilfe organization at the Berlin Sportpalast, which earned her a temporary professional ban (Berufsverbot) when the Nazis and Hitler came to power the next year. After she joined the Reichskulturkammer association the ban was lifted, but Propaganda Minister Joseph Goebbels continued to regard her with suspicion because her manners and appearance contradicted the official role model of women in Nazi Germany. Waldoff had to cope with further stage and publication bans. In 1939, she and Olga von Roeder left Berlin together to retire in Bayerisch Gmain, Bavaria. In World War II she made last appearances in Wunschkonzert broadcasts of the Großdeutscher Rundfunk and in Wehrmacht troop entertainment shows.

After the war, she lost her savings in the West German monetary reform of 1948 and from 1951 relied on little monetary support by the Senate of Berlin. In 1953, she wrote her autobiography. Waldoff died aged 72 after a stroke and was buried in the Pragfriedhof cemetery in Stuttgart. In 1963, her life partner Olly von Roeder was buried alongside Waldoff's grave.

Claire Waldoff has a star on the Walk of Fame of Cabaret, Mainz.

== Songs by Waldoff ==
- Wer schmeißt denn da mit Lehm
- Hermann heeßt er!
- Nach meine Beene is ja janz Berlin verrückt!
- Wegen Emil seine unanständ´ge Lust
- An de Panke – an de Wuhle – an de Spree
- Was braucht der Berliner, um glücklich zu sein?
- Romanze vom Wedding
- Da geht mir der Hut hoch
- 1909:
  - Das Varieté (1909)
  - Das Schmackeduzchen (M.: Walter Kollo, T.: Hermann Frey)
- 1910:
  - Det Scheenste sind die Beenekins (M: Walter Kollo, T.: C. Waldoff).
  - Kuno der Weiberfeind (Rudolf Nelson).
  - Morgens willste nicht und abends kannste nicht (E. Hartmann).
  - Mir hab’n se de Gurke vom Schnitzel weggemopst.
- 1911:
  - ’ne dufte Stadt ist mein Berlin (M.: Walter Kollo, T.: Hardt).
  - Wenn der Bräutigam mit der Braut so mang die Wälder geht (M.: Walter Kollo, T.: Hardt).
  - Nach meine Beene is ja janz Berlin verrückt (M.: Walter Kollo, T.: Hardt).
  - Was liegt bei Lehmann unterm Apfelbaum (M.: Walter Kollo, T.: A.O. Alberts).
  - Knoll der Trommler (Soldatenlied).
  - Der kleine Kadett (Soldatenlied).
  - Und wieder stand ich Wache (Soldatenlied).
  - Knoll, jawoll (Soldatenlied).
- 1912:
  - Soldatenmarschlied (or, Wenn die Soldaten durch die Stadt marschieren). (J.F. Rollers).
  - Er ist nach mir verrückt (M.: Max Kluck, T.: Ludwig Mendelssohn).
  - Er stand beim Train (or, Die Tante aus Hamburg). (Heinrich Lautensack)
  - Gustav mit’m Simili (M.: O.B. Roeser, T.: Harry Senger).
  - Das noble Berlin (M.: Georg Mewes, T.: Harry Senger).
  - Na, dann laß es dir mal jut bekommen (M.: Walter Kollo, T.: Hartmann).
- 1913:
  - Mir ist so trübe (Soldatenlied).
  - Klärchen aus dem Gartenhaus (Harry Senger).
  - For mir (Köchinnenlied) (Harry Senger).
  - Ich gehe meinen Schlendrian (Studentenlied).
  - So denkt im Frühling die Berlinerin (Hermann Schultze-Buch).
  - Was meinste Mensch, wie man sich täuschen kann (M.: Gutkind, T.: Willy Hagen).
  - Es ist nicht gerade angenehm (Jobst Haslinde).
  - Kusslehre (Jobst Haslinde).
  - Herr Meyer, Herr Meyer, wo bleibt denn bloß mein Reiher (from the operetta "So bummeln wir") (Jean Gilbert).
  - Die Berliner Pflanze (M.: Otto Erich Lindner, T.: Alexander Tyrkowski).
  - Berlin, so siehste aus (Niklas-Kempner).
  - Hermann heeßt er (Ludwig Mendelssohn).
  - Zippel-Polka (Hermann Schultze-Buch).
  - Moritat (Ludwig Mendelssohn).
  - Argentinisch (M.: Ehrlich, T.: Alexander Tyrkowski).
  - Fern der Heimat (Soldatenlied).
  - Das Produkt unserer Zeit (before 1914)
  - Des Treulosen Entschuldigung (before 1914)
- 1914:
  - Kann ich dafür? (Jobst Haslinde).
  - Burlala (Studentenlied).
  - Der Soldate (Marsch-Duett aus der Operette "Immer feste druff", with Karl Gessner) (Walter Kollo).
  - Auf der Banke, an der Panke (aus der Operette "Immer feste druff", with Karl Gessner) (Walter Kollo).
  - Soldaten-Romanze (around 1914)
- 1915:
  - Waldmar-Mieze-Duett (aus der Operette "Woran wir denken", mit Guido Thielscher) (M.: Jean Gilbert, T.: Walter Turzinsky).
  - Mein Justav (aus der Operette "Woran wir denken") (M.: Jean Gilbert, T.: Walter Turzinsky).
  - Da kann kein Kaiser und kein König was machen (T.: Claire Waldoff).
  - Es steht ein Storch auf einem Bein
- 1916:
- Wozu hat der Soldat eine Braut? (Bromme).
- Maxe von der schweren Artillerie! (Leander).
- Kriegslied eines Tertianers (Ludwig Mendelssohn).
- Dann hat Reserve Ruh (Konrad Scherber).
- Schlesisches Soldatenlied (Willy Prager).
- Jetzt ist's zu Ende mit der Schiesserei (Hartmann).
- ... (1917–1932)
- 1933:
- Werderlied (or, Was willst du denn im Engadin?) (M.: Erwin Strauss, T.: Käthe Huldschinsky).
- Ich kann um zehne nicht nach Hause geh’n (M.: Claus Clauberg, T.: Erich Kersten).
- Unsere Minna (M.: Claus Clauberg, T.: Erich Kersten).
- Menschliches – Allzumenschliches (M.: Claus Clauberg, T.: Erich Kersten).
- Mach’ kein Meckmeck’ (M.: Mac Rauls, T.: Erich Kersten).
- Hätt’ste det von Ferdinand jedacht? (M.: Mac Rauls, T.: Willy Hagen).
- Bei mir da häng’ste (or, über meinem Bett) (M.: Alex Stone and Walter Borchert, T.: Alex Stone and Friedrich Schwarz).
- Dann wackelt die Wand (M.: Mac Rauls, T.: Erich Kersten).
- Gruß an unsere Heimat (M.: Werner Schütte, T.: Erich Kersten and Koenigsborn).
- Nu schön, da haben wir eben Pech gehabt (or, Ich hab ein Herz) (M.: Werner Schütte, T.: Erich Kersten and Koenigsborn).

== Recordings ==
Claire Waldoff Die Königin der Kleinkunst Folge 1 und 2; Membran Music documents 2005 (Distribution Grosser und Stein) Folge 1: ISBN 3865623123, EAN 4011222232267, Folge 2: ISBN 3865623131, EAN 4011222232274. Two digipack in book format (14 x 25 cm), each containing a 20 page booklet and 4 CDs with 77 tracks spanning from 1910 to 1951 (one unpublished recording), however not all of the tracks could be dated. The 154 recordings in this edition are at present the most comprehensive compilation of her musical work.

== Books by Waldoff ==
- Claire Waldoff: Weeste noch ...! Aus meinen Erinnerungen. Progress-Verlag, Düsseldorf/Munich 1953; new edition: „Weeste noch ...?“ Erinnerungen und Dokumente. Parthas, Berlin 1997, ISBN 3-932529-11-1

== Literature ==
- Helga Bemmann: Wer schmeißt denn da mit Lehm. Eine Claire-Waldoff-Biographie. VEB Lied der Zeit, Berlin Ost [1984?]; new edition: Claire Waldoff. „Wer schmeißt denn da mit Lehm?“ Ullstein, Frankfurt/Berlin 1994, ISBN 3-548-35430-0
- Maegie Koreen: Immer feste druff. Das freche Leben der Kabarettkönigin Claire Waldoff. Droste, Düsseldorf 1997, ISBN 3-7700-1074-4
