= David Affengruber (footballer, born 1992) =

Austrian footballer

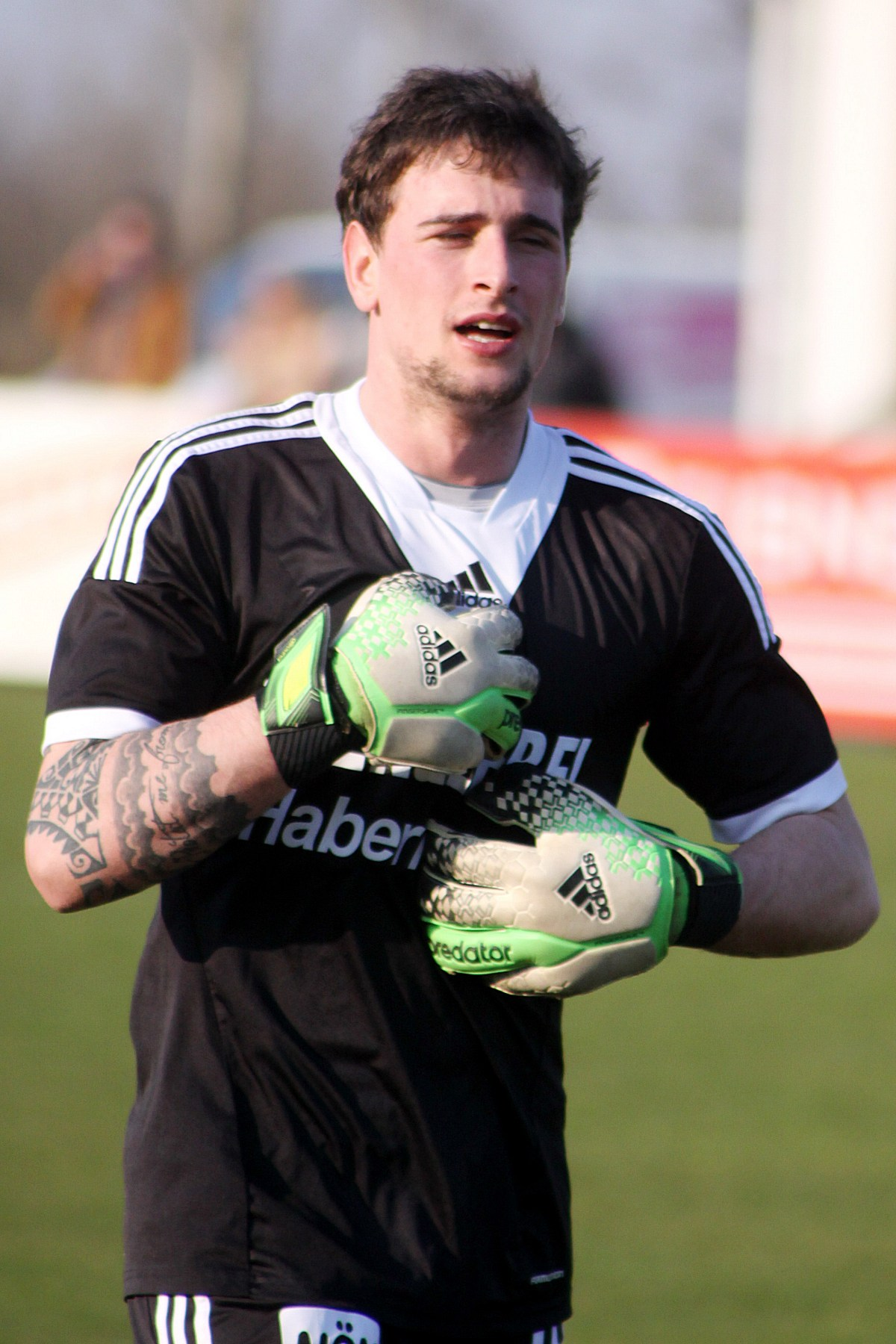
- Affengruber in 2014

Personal information
- Date of birth: 4 March 1992 (age 34)
- Place of birth: Nöchling, Austria
- Height: 1.85 m (6 ft 1 in)
- Position: Goalkeeper

Team information
- Current team: SV Horn II; SV Horn (goalkeeping coach)

Youth career
- 1998–2006: TSV Nöchling
- 2006–2010: AKA St. Polten

Senior career*
Years	Team	Apps	(Gls)
2010–2012	SV Gaflenz	59	(0)
2012–2022	SKU Amstetten	149	(0)
2022–2023	SC Zwettl	26	(0)
2023–2024	SV Yspertal	0	(0)
2024–	SV Horn II	1	(0)

Managerial career
- 2023–: SV Horn (goalkeeping coach)
- * Club domestic league appearances and goals as of 19:48, 2 November 2024 (UTC)

David Affengruber (born 4 March 1992) is an Austrian football goalkeeper who plays for 2. Landesliga club SV Horn II, and is the goalkeeping coach of their first team.

== Coaching career ==
In July 2023, Affengruber was appointed goalkeeping coach of SV Horn.
