= Lattengebirge =

Mountain range in Germany

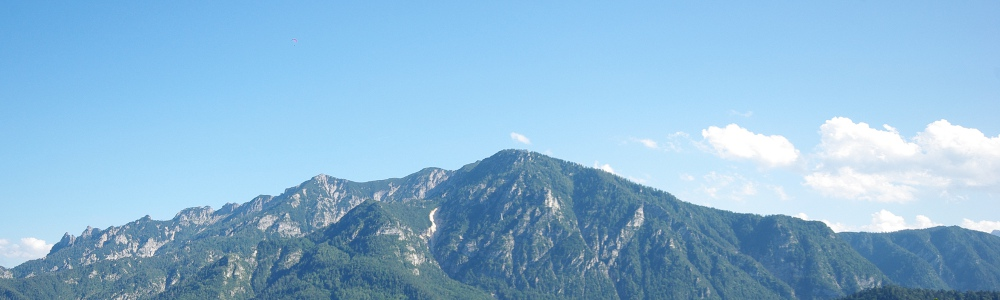
- The Lattengebirge from the north

Highest point
- Peak: Karkopf
- Elevation: 1,738 m above NN

Dimensions
- Length: 9 km (5.6 mi)

Geography
- Location within Alps
- State: Bavaria
- Range coordinates: 47°41′00″N 12°53′00″E
- Parent range: Berchtesgaden Alps

The Lattengebirge, also sometimes called the Latten Mountains, are a mountain range up to 1,738 m above sea level (NN) in the county of Berchtesgadener Land in the German state of Bavaria. They form a subgroup of the Berchtesgaden Alps and forms the northern end of its parent range.

== Geography ==
=== Location ===
The Lattengebirge lie northeast of the Reiteralm, from which they are separated by the mountain pass of Schwarzbachwacht, and west of the Untersberg, from which they are separated by the Hallthurm Pass. They are located within the municipalities of Ramsau, Bischofswiesen, Bayerisch Gmain, Bad Reichenhall and Schneizlreuth, as well as the former unparished areas (now parishes of the respective municipalities of) Forst Taubensee (Ramsau), Forst St. Zeno (Bayerisch Gmain, Bad Reichenhall und Schneizlreuth) and Bischofswiesener Forst (Bischofswiesen), and they are also within the Berchtesgaden Biosphere Reserve. The Saalach, a southwestern tributary of the Salzach, flows past the Lattengebirge to the northwest running in a southwest to northeast direction.

=== Peaks ===
The highest peak of the Lattengebirge is the Karkopf (1,738 m). Important touring summits are the Predigtstuhl (1,613 m) with its mountain hotel, the Dreisesselberg (1,680 m) and the Dötzenkopf (1,001 m).

== Topography and geology ==
The Lattengebirge consist mainly of Dachstein limestone and Ramsau Dolomite, the dolomite containing various proportions of magnesium. Because the rocks have weathered unevenly, bizarre formations have been created in the Lattengebirge; these include Steinerne Agnes ("Stony Agnes", ca. 1,400 m), the rugged crags below the Predigtstuhl Cable Car and the striking formation of the Rotofen pinnacles at the eastern end of the Lattengebirge. These are known locally as the Schlafende Hexe (the "Sleeping Witch") or Montgelas-Nase ("Montgelas' Nose"). Less well known is the roughly 1,585 m Teufelsloch ("Devil's Bowl"). This is a roughly 5-metre-long natural rock arch with a diameter of around 2.5 metres and lies in a hillock-like eminences on the southeastern rocky ridge between the Schlafende Hexe and the Alpgarten.

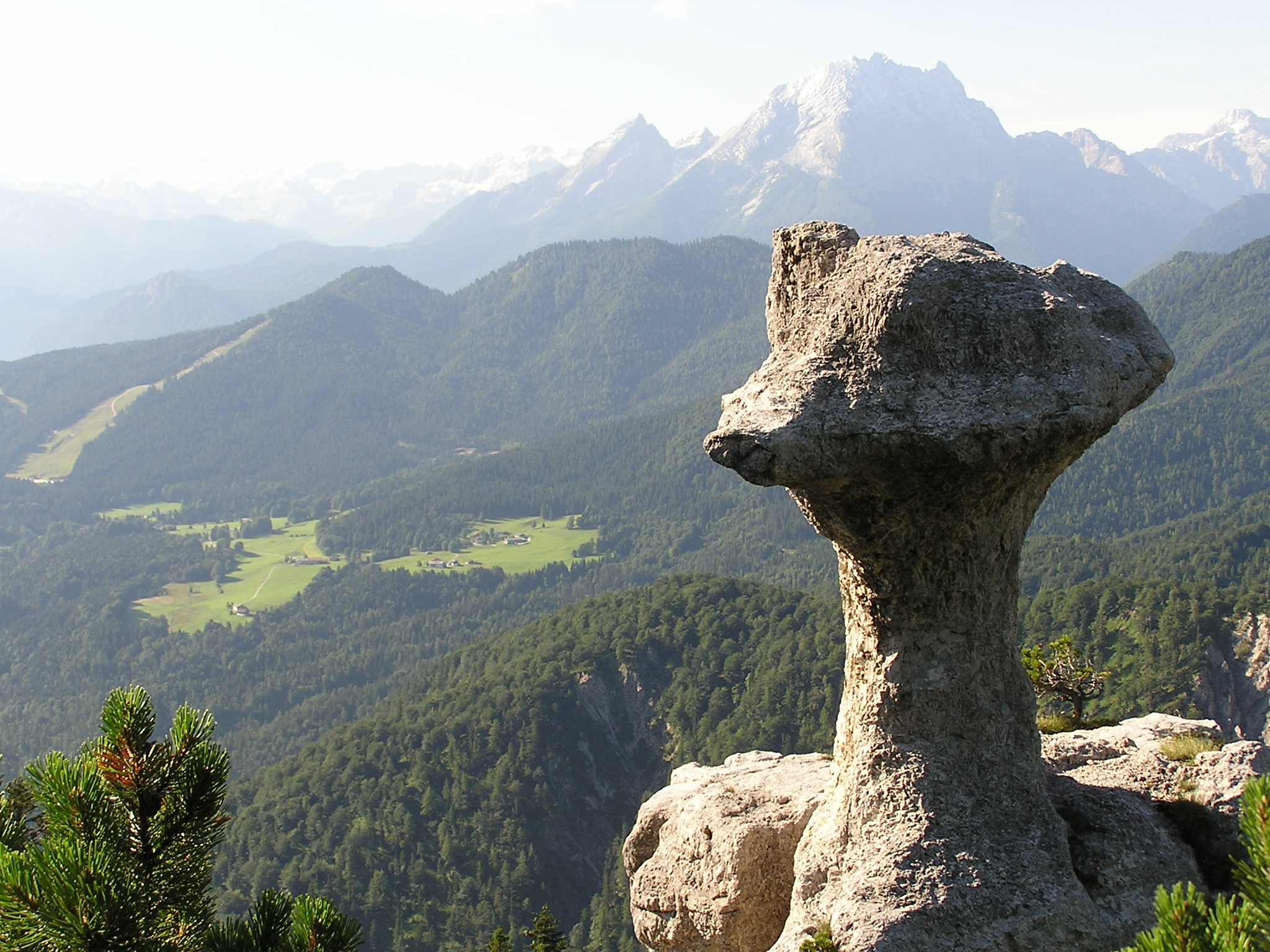
The Steinerne Agnes

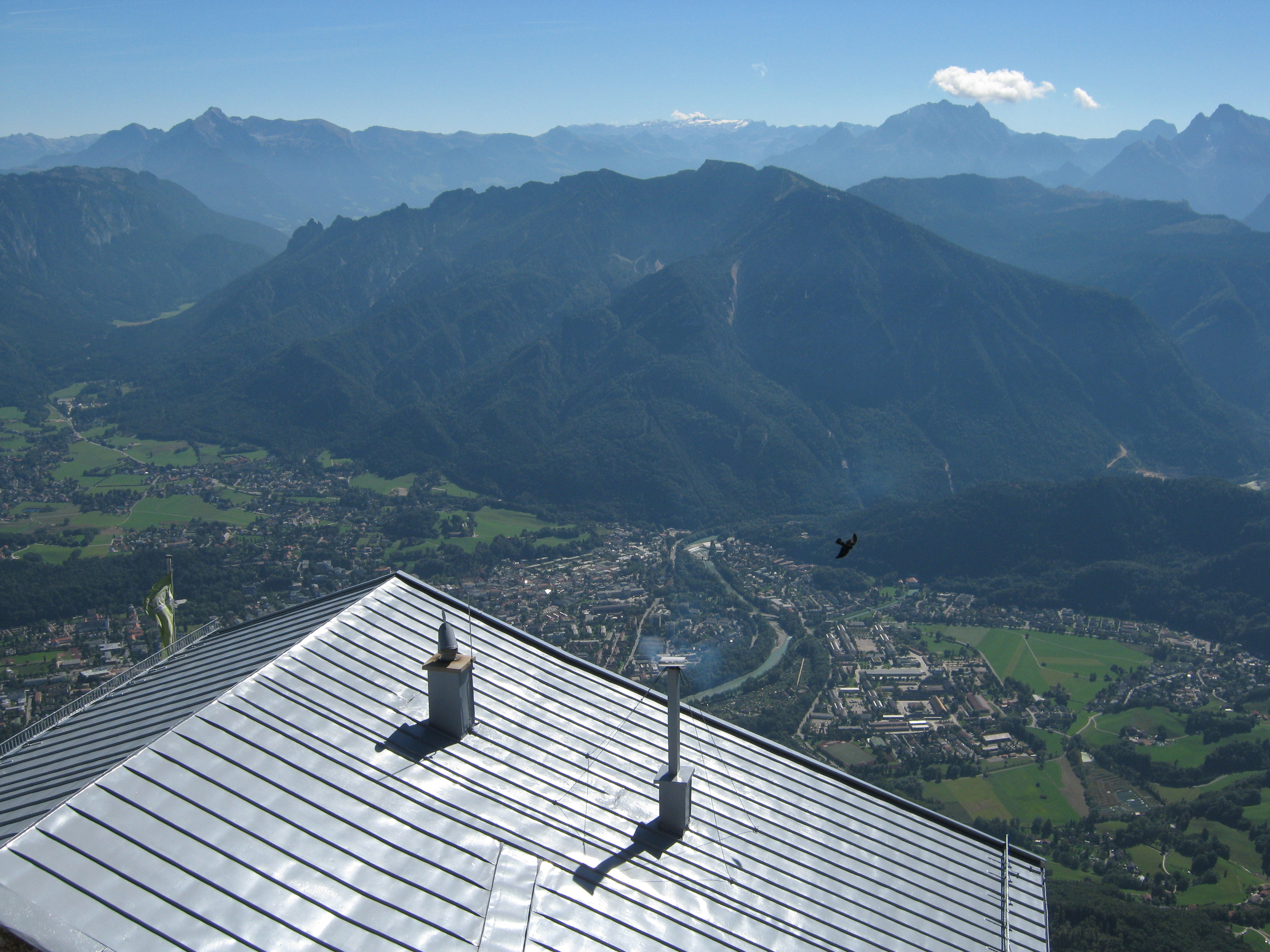
The Schlafende Hexe and Predigtstuhl

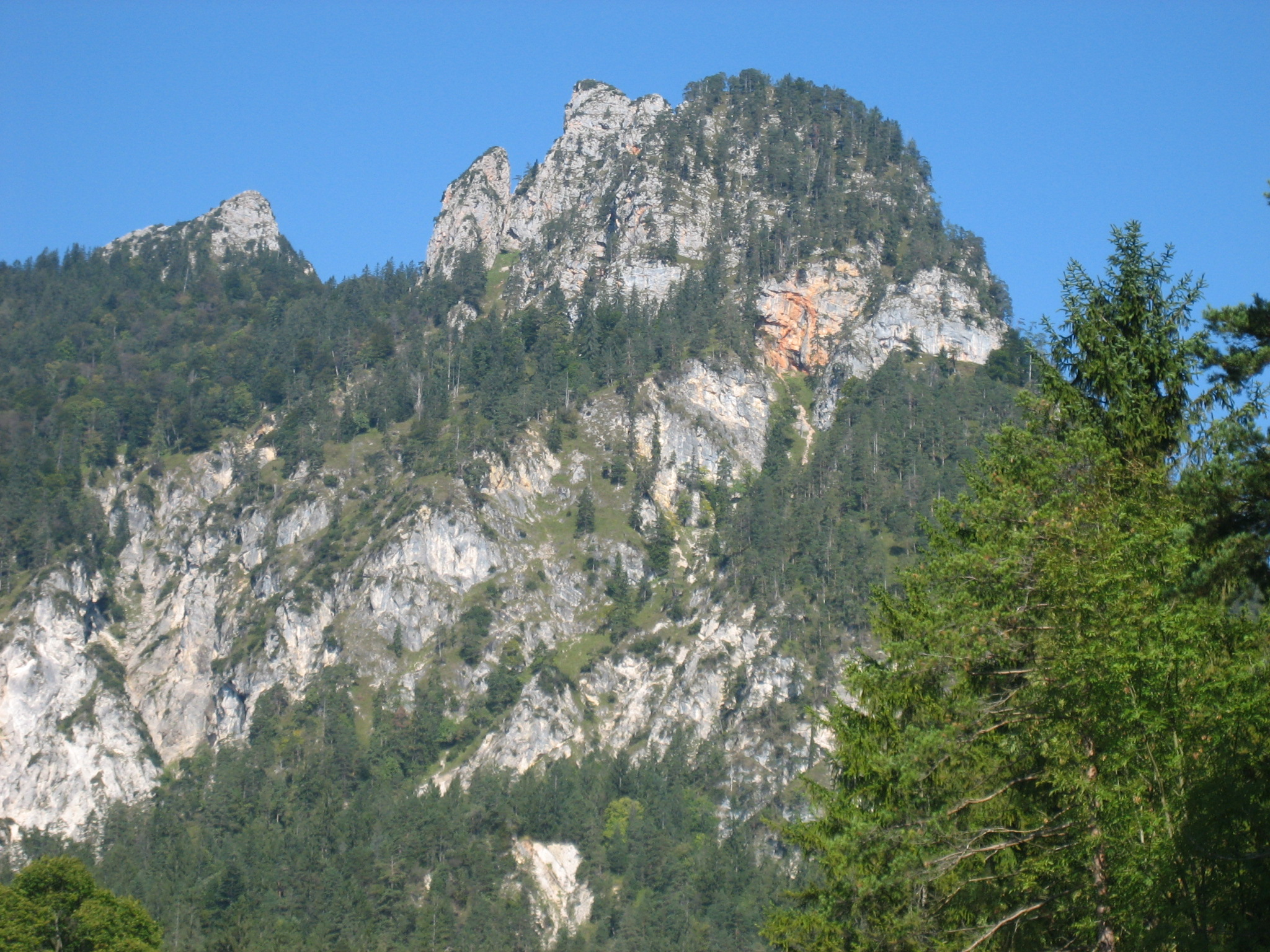
Rotofen towers

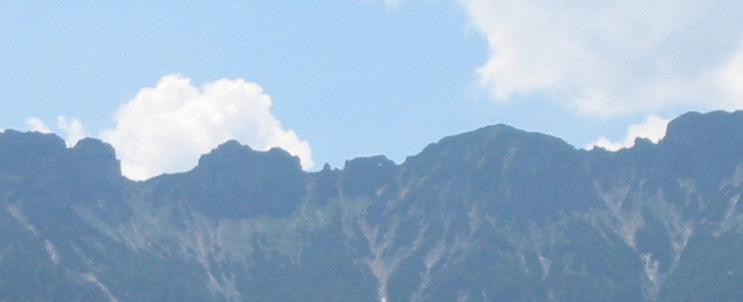
The Teufelsloch

== Tourism and development ==
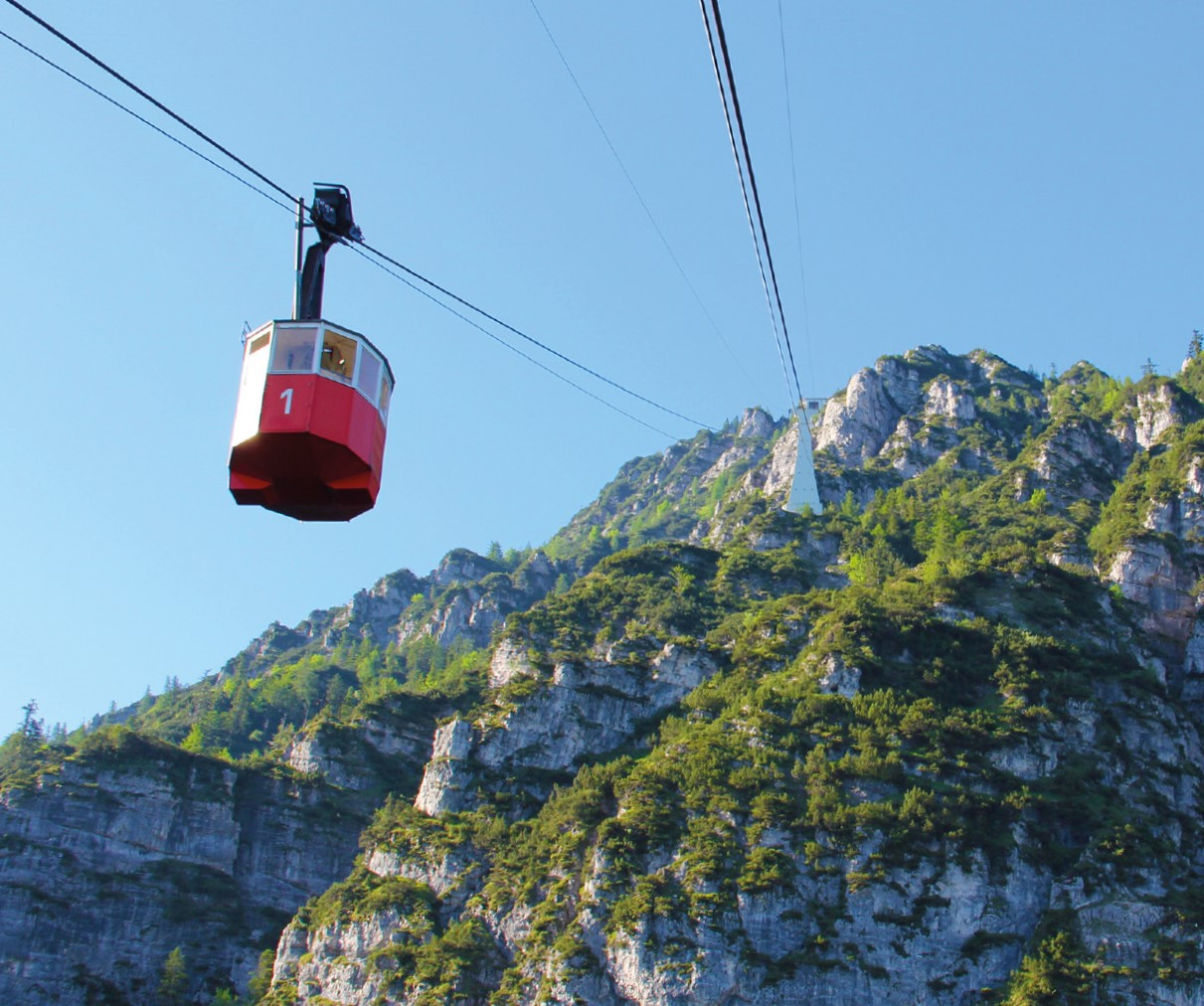
Predigtstuhl Cable Car

From Bad Reichenhall, visitors can take the Predigtstuhl Cable Car to the Predigtstuhl mountain top. The cable car dates to 1928 and is the oldest surviving original large cabin cable car in the world. On the site of the mountain station, there is a restaurant with a panoramic terrace. It takes about 15 minutes by foot to reach the rustic alpine hut on the Schlegelmulde which serves traditional local specialties. The walking path from the mountain station to the alpine hut is well-maintained all year round.

In addition, the Lattengebirge are home to ski areas of Hochschwarzeck near Ramsau and Götschen near Bischofswiesen-Loipl.
