= Karkopf =

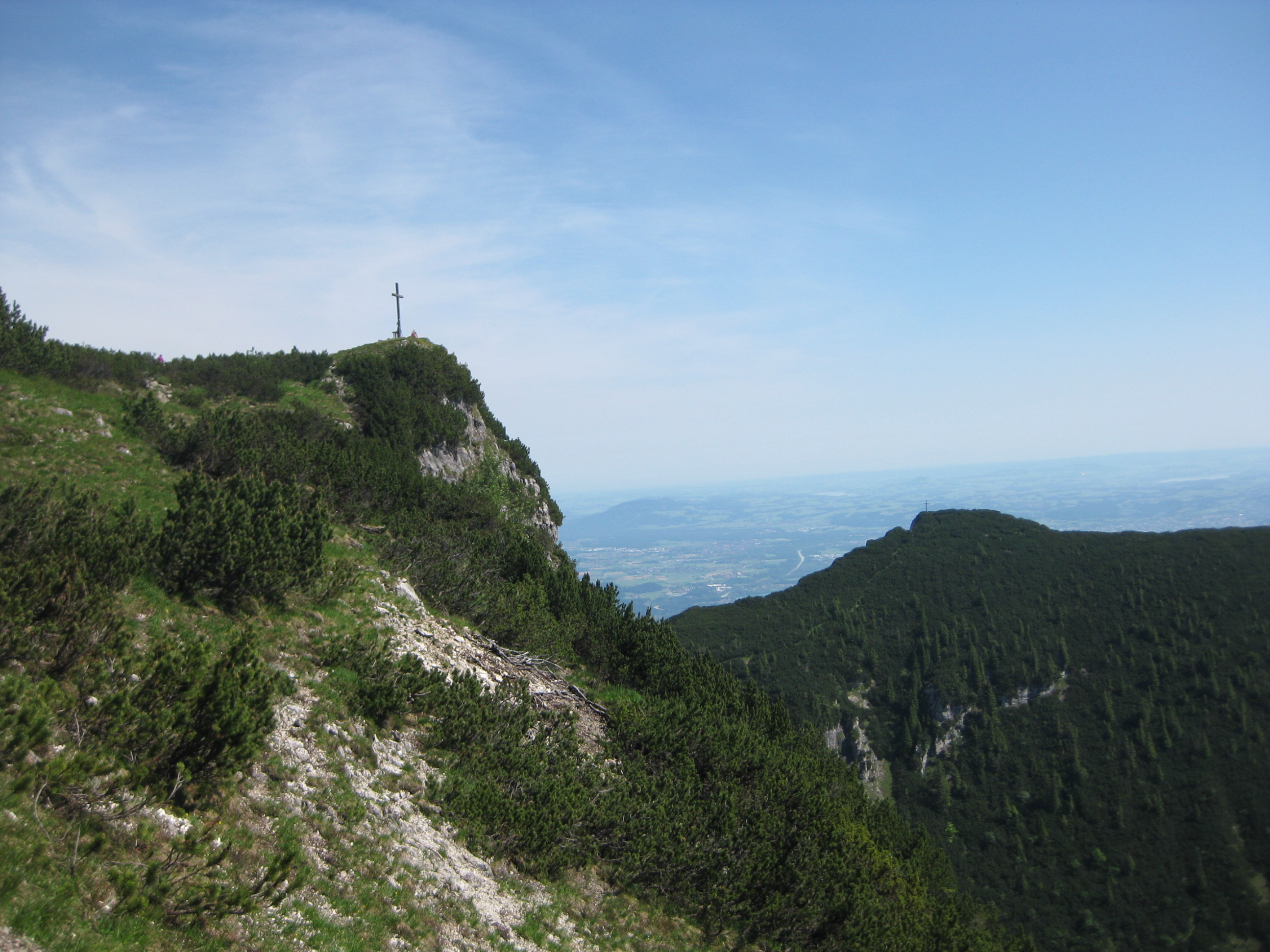

Highest point
- Elevation: 1,738 m (5,702 ft)
- Prominence: 842 m (2,762 ft)
- Coordinates: 47°41′11″N 12°53′32″E

Geography
- Location: Bavaria, Germany

The Karkopf is a mountain, 1,738 m, and the highest peak of the whole Lattengebirge range in the German state of Bavaria. It lies exactly on the boundary between the municipality of Bayerisch Gmain (parish of Forst St. Zeno) to the west and the municipality of Bischofswiesen (parish of Bischofswiesener Forst) to the east.

As a consequence of its good long-distance views over the whole mountain massif, the mountain is a popular walking area. The mountains of Untersberg, Hoher Göll and Watzmann may be seen to the south, and the Zwiesel and Hochstaufen to the north. The summit may be ascended from various sides, e.g. via the Predigtstuhl or along the Törlschneid from Winkl. The ascent on the Alpgartensteig path has an easy klettersteig character with several ladders, steps and cables as protection. The route is only suited to experienced mountain walkers, because you need to have a head for heights and sure-footedness. From the top, you can walk to the top station of the Predigtstuhl Cable Car and from there get to the Bad Reichenhall Cable Car. It is also possible to walk from the Steinerne Agnes rocks and to the Rotofen rock towers.
