= Dötzenkopf =

Coordinates: 47°42′32″N 12°53′18″E

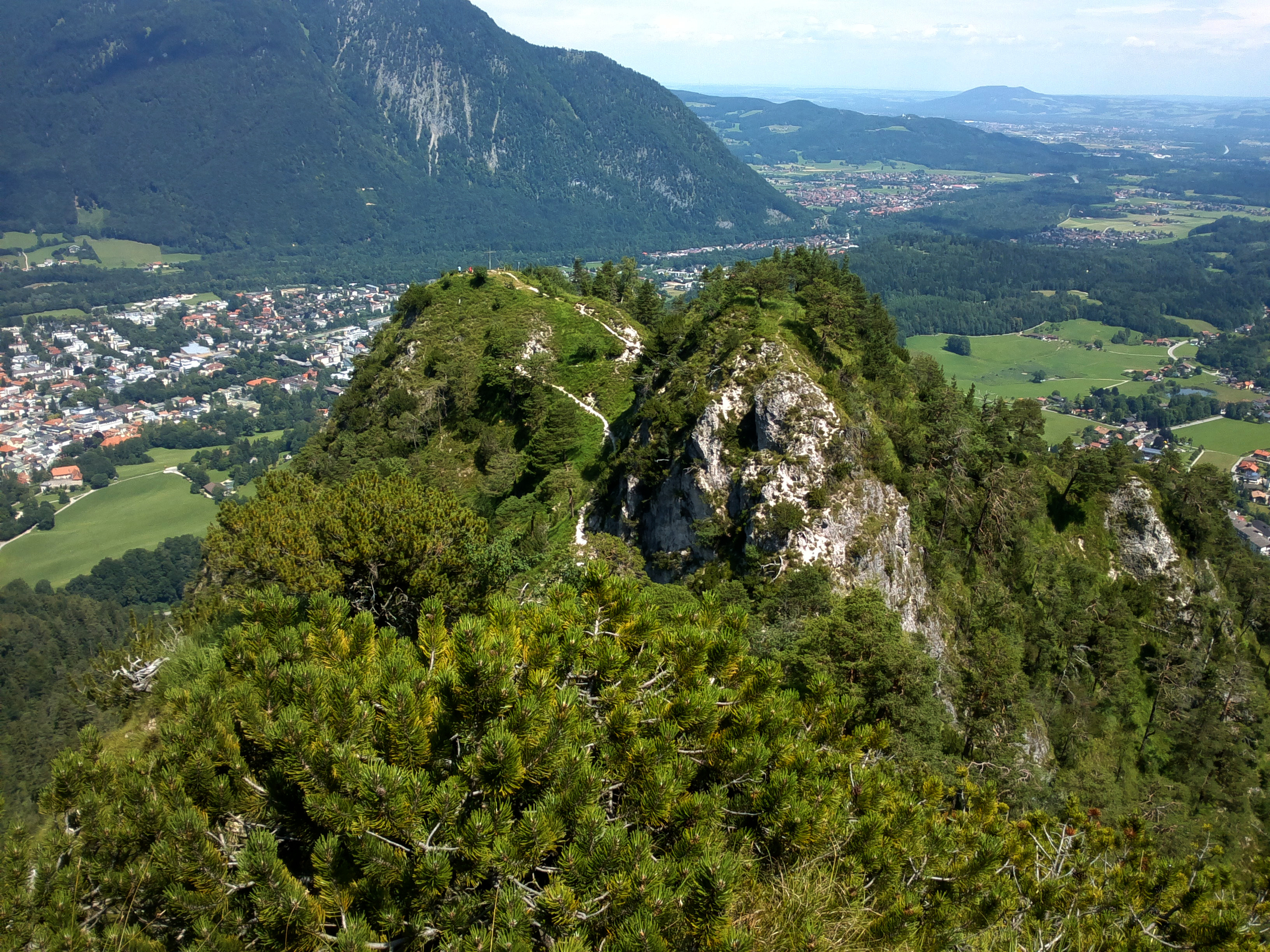

Highest point
- Elevation: 1,001 m (3,284 ft)

Geography
- Location: Bavaria, Germany

Dötzenkopf is a mountain of Bavaria, Germany.
