= Grabenbach (Bad Reichenhall) =

River in Bavaria, Germany

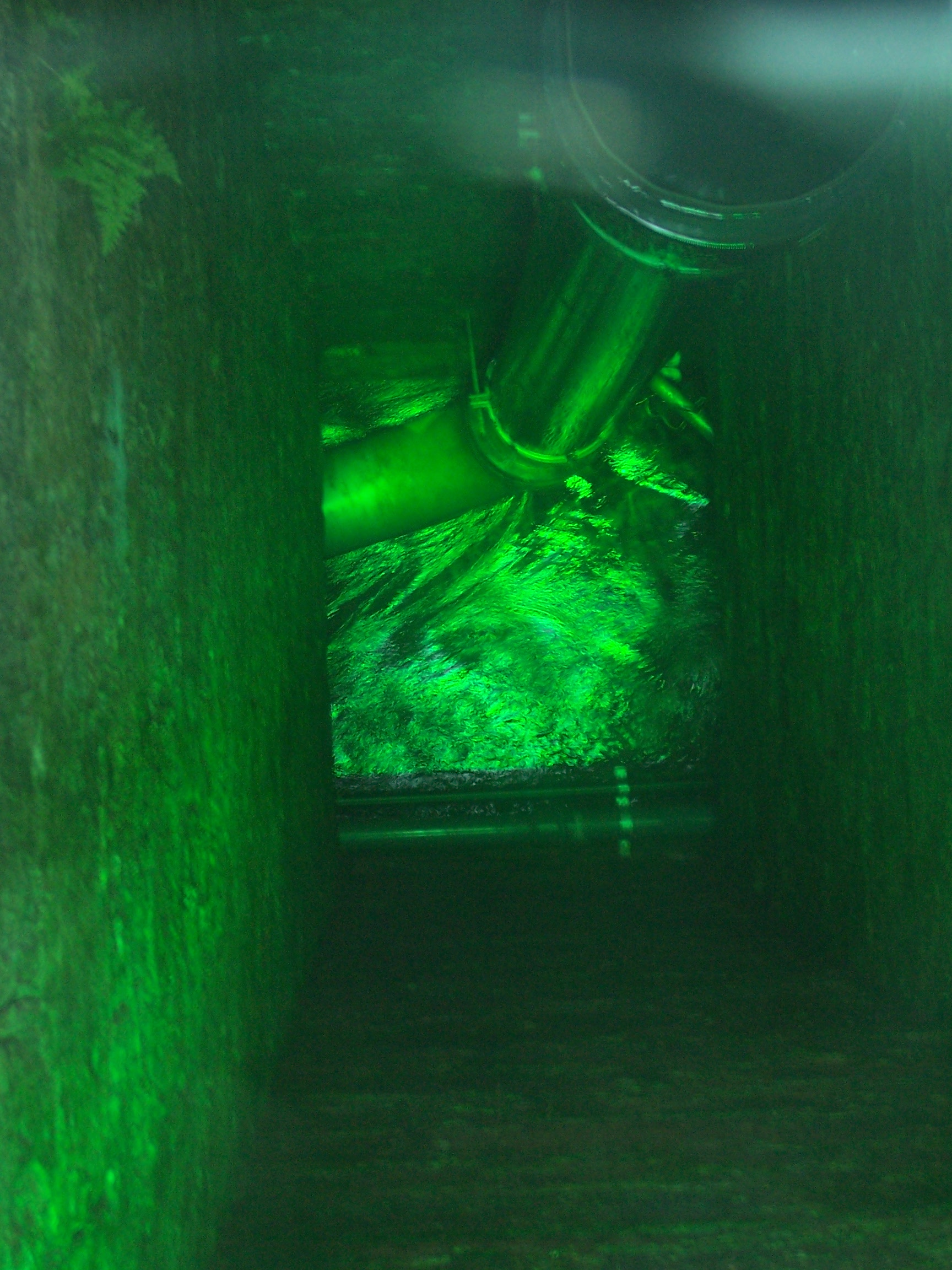
- Tunnel at the spa garden (the green colour is due to the illumination)

Location
- Country: Germany
- States: Bavaria

Physical characteristics
- Mouth
  - location: Saalach
  - coordinates: 47.7538°N 12.9100°E

Basin features
- Progression: Saalach→ Salzach→ Inn→ Danube→ Black Sea

Grabenbach is a small river located in Bavaria, Germany.

The Grabenbach is a tributary of the Saalach, and is about 4 kilometres (2.5 mi) long. For the first 1,878 metres (6,161 ft) the river flows in an underground channel below the city of Bad Reichenhall. In this section the deepest part flows 11 metres (36 ft) under the surface.

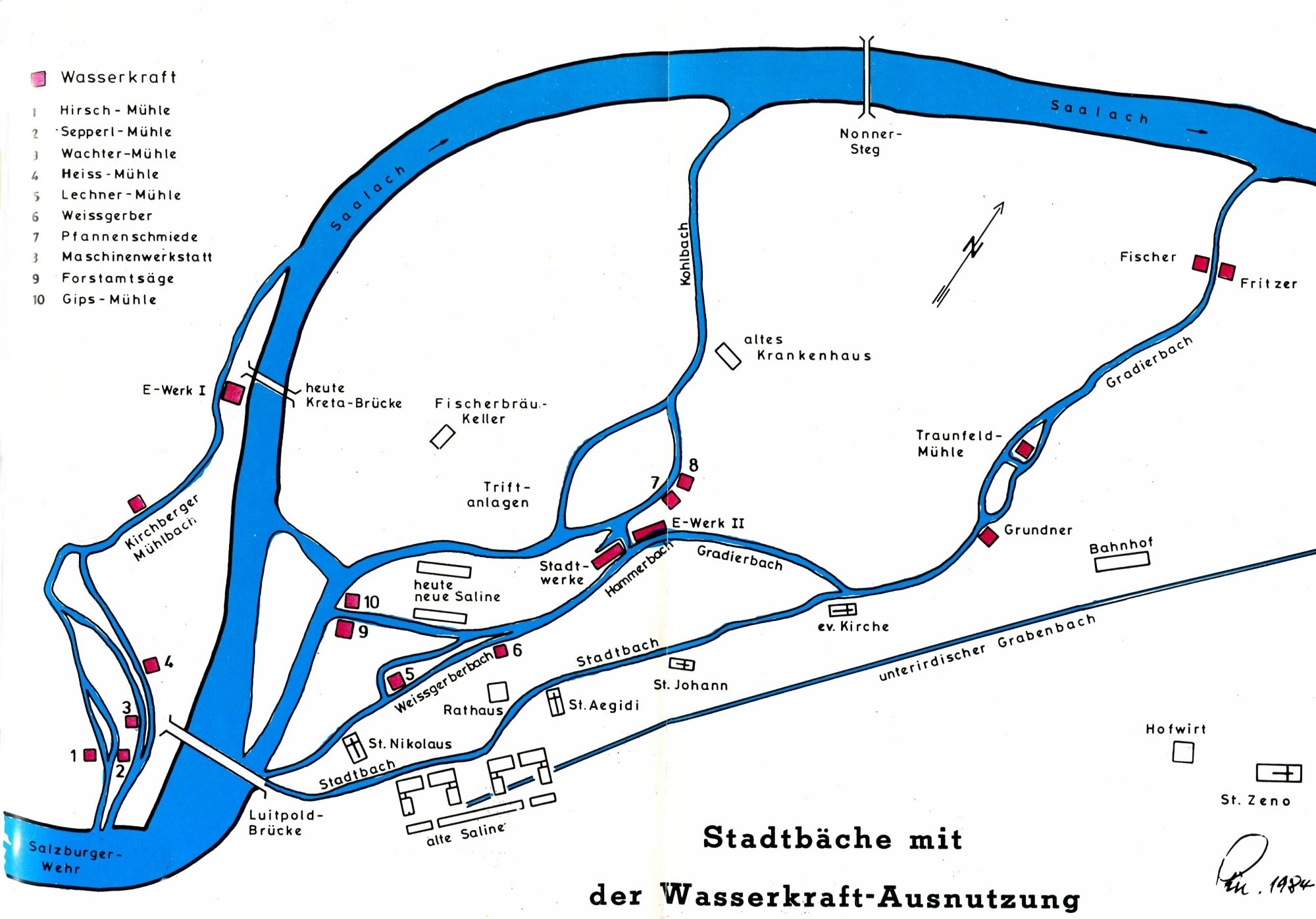
Course of streams and Grabenbach in Bad Reichenhall around 1900. The red squares are places where hydropower was used, e.g. mills.

== History ==
The tunnel was built according to the plans of Erasmus Grasser from about 1524 to 1538. After the route was determined in 1522, construction started in 1524 under the direction of master builder Fabian Zehentner and the supervision of the Salzmaier (supervisor of the saline) Hans Humbs. The tunnel was dug from north to south, towards the higher saline. Therefore as work progressed one had to dig deeper and deeper, since a gradient of 8.5 metres (28 ft) had to be compensated for. For 1,975 metres (6,480 ft) of its length, the canal was walled at 2 metres (6 ft 7 in) high and 2.5 metres (8 ft 2 in) wide, vaulted, and then filled with soil again. In 1534, the well shaft was reached and in 1538 the construction work was finished.

== Course ==
The Grabenbach begins in the old saline and reaches the surface again near the street Gewerkenstraße. Over the nearly 2 kilometres (1.2 mi) long line, there are five air shafts. Then it flows for another 2,550 metres (8,370 ft) through the Marzoller Au to the Saalach. At Kurstraße street, one of the shafts was renovated, and now through a glass plate one can see the Grabenbach flowing in the deep. The river is passable by boat, and at irregular intervals guided tours through the tunnel are offered for small groups.

== Purpose ==
The Grabenbach leads intruding fresh water and water driving the wheels out of the galleries, so that it does not mix with the salty water. Today a part of the water is used for a water-treading basin in the pedestrian zone. Additionally, there are pipes in the canal that carry the brine to the graduation tower and the spa pump room. Also, rainwater of the pedestrian zone is led into the Grabenbach.

== See also ==
- List of rivers of Bavaria
