= Predigtstuhl Cable Car =

Aerial lift in Germany

Coordinates: 47.7165°N 12.8722°E

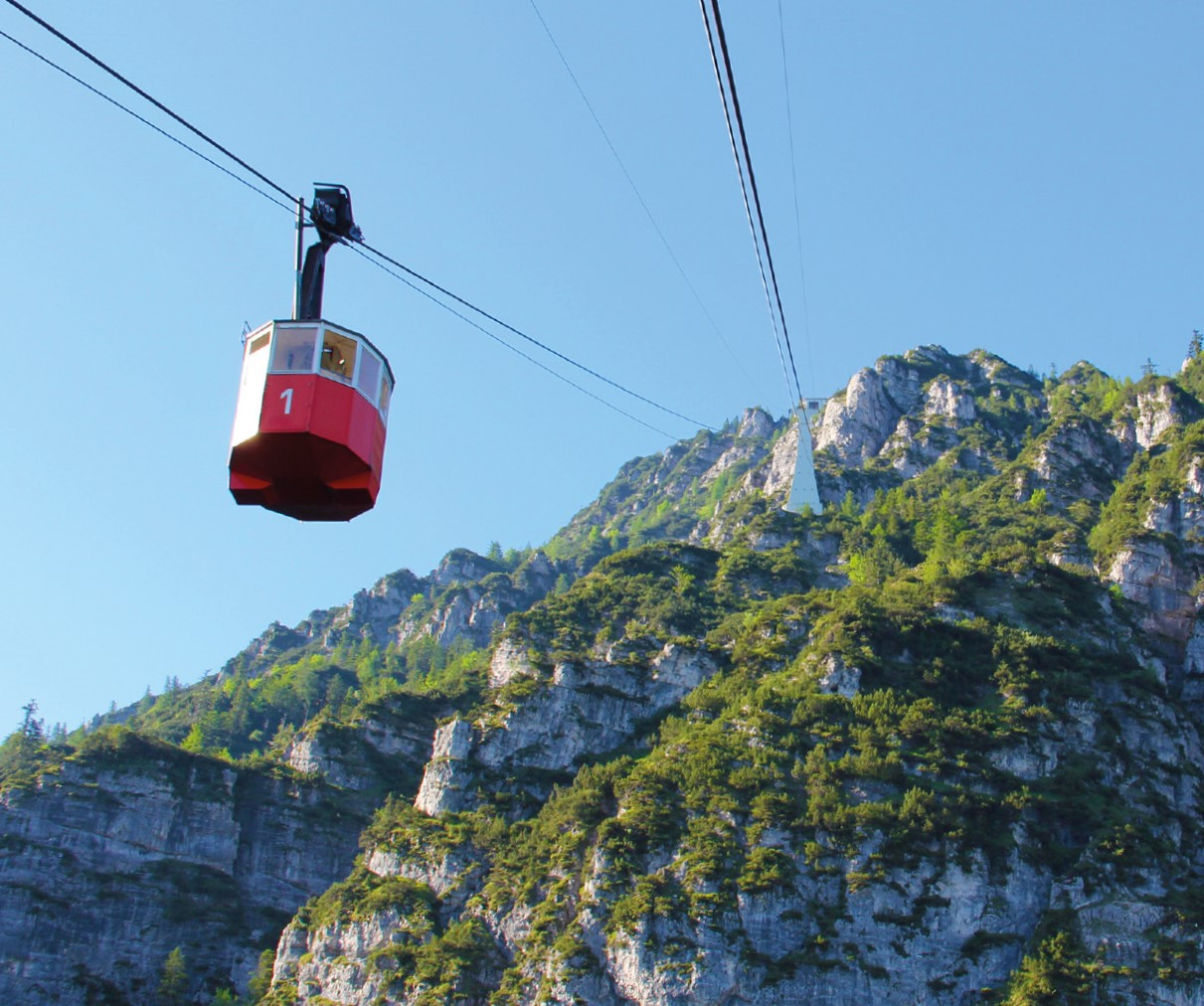
Predigtstuhl cable car and pavilion cabin

The Predigtstuhl Cable Car (German: Predigtstuhlbahn) is an aerial lift in Bad Reichenhall in Bavaria, Germany which connects the city with the top of the Predigtstuhl mountain in the Berchtesgaden Alps. It has been in operation since 1928. As the world’s oldest large-cabin cable car preserved in its original condition, the cableway is listed as a protected monument.

== History and construction ==
The Predigtstuhl Cable Car is considered a landmark achievement of early cableway engineering. It was developed in the 1920s to help the spa town regain competitiveness after World War I and the economic crises that followed. Key initiators included hotelier Alois Seethaler and spa director Josef Niedermeier, who brought leading experts to the town, notably engineer Alois Zuegg, a pioneer of modern aerial ropeway technology. The heartpiece, the wire ropeway drive technology and the two pavilion passenger cabins, was manufactured by Adolf Bleichert from Leipzig, Europe's leading company for wire ropeways at that time. For the cabins, a completely new design was developed, which, as a dodecagon, was not only visually pleasing but also more aerodynamic than the previously common bulky box-like carriages. A damper was installed which cushions the swaying after passing over the support towers. The steel wire ropes were supplied by Westfälische Drahtindustrie AG of Hamm. The original carrying cable remains in service to this day (as of 2018).

Together with Adolf Bleichert, Zuegg refined the innovative Bleichert–Zuegg system. In the years that followed, approximately three quarters of all cable cars worldwide were built using the patented "Bleichert-Zuegg system".

The Predigtstuhlbahn's architecture was designed by Wilhelm Kahrs of Hochtief from Munich, while the three distinctive skyward-reaching support towers were engineered by Otto Streck and Alfred Zenns. These monumental support towers as well as the mountain restaurant and the upper and lower stations are examples of New Objectivity, a short-lived architectural movement that is closely associated with the Bauhaus.

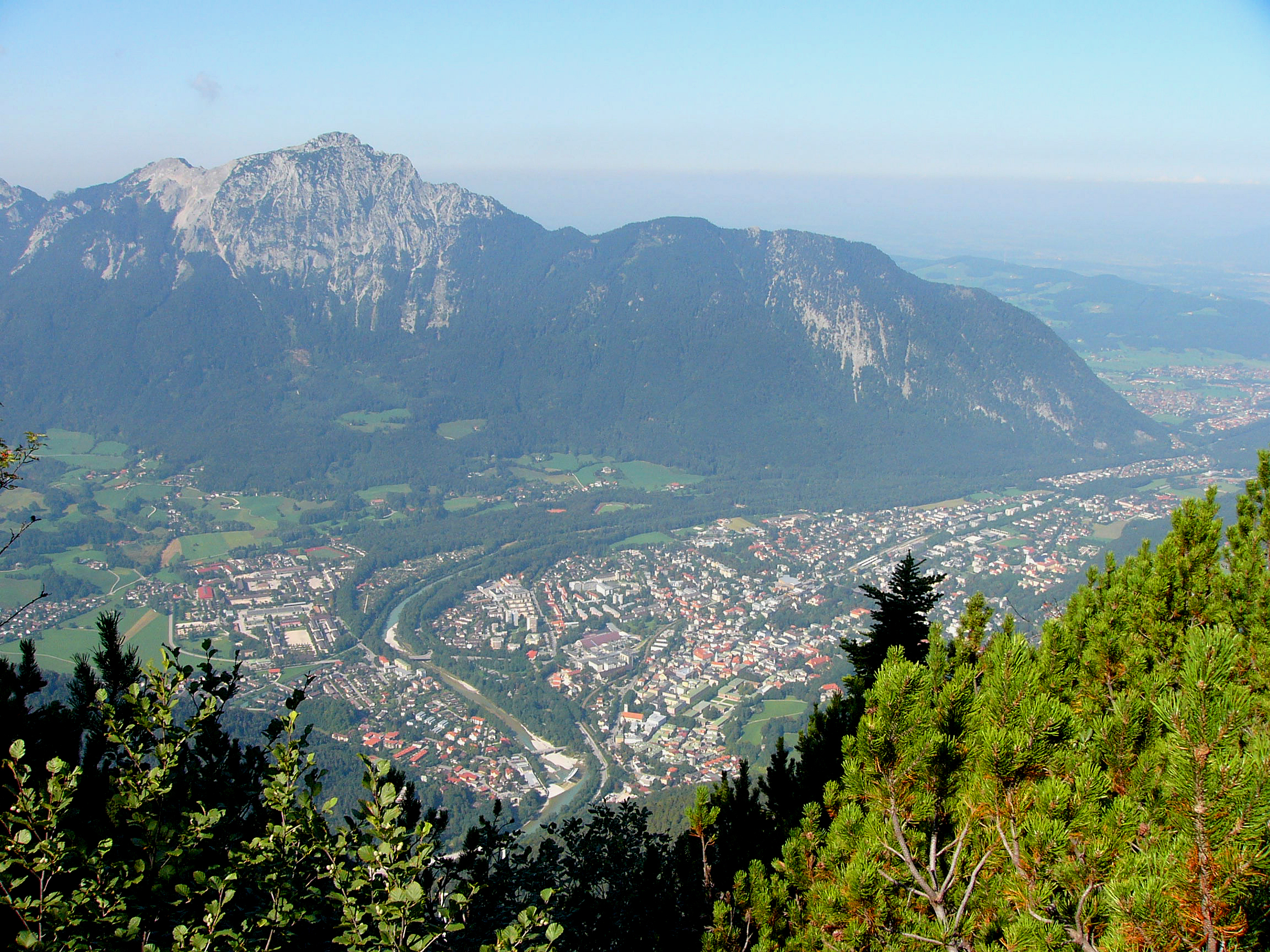
View from the top of the mountain Predigtstuhl onto Bad Reichenhall and the mountain Hochstaufen

The mountain and valley stations were constructed from 1927 to 1928 and are architecturally reduced to their essential function. The dominant central structure housing the cabins and platforms is emphasized, while the waiting areas, administrative offices, storage, and technical rooms are visually subordinated. The window openings decrease in size toward the upper levels, intended to reflect the increasing height of the mountain. The mountain restaurant reinforces the character of the summit and is conceived as an extension of the city. Its façade therefore exhibits a formal austerity. The use of wood as a building material was deliberately avoided, creating a conscious contrast to traditional alpine huts and appealing to a more urbane and sophisticated clientele.

After a year of construction, the Predigtstuhl Cable Car began operations on 1 July 1928. Contemporary international press praised its speed, quiet operation, and safety. For Bad Reichenhall, the cable car was regarded as a symbol of economic revival. The Predigtstuhl mountain soon became a social meeting place for elite visitors.

Two years after its completion, Bleichert built the Aeri de Montserrat cable car to the Benedictine monastery of Montserrat near Barcelona, following the same principle. In 1931, the Port Vell Aerial Tramway was inaugurated there as well which is also an almost identical copy of the Predigtstuhl Cable Car.

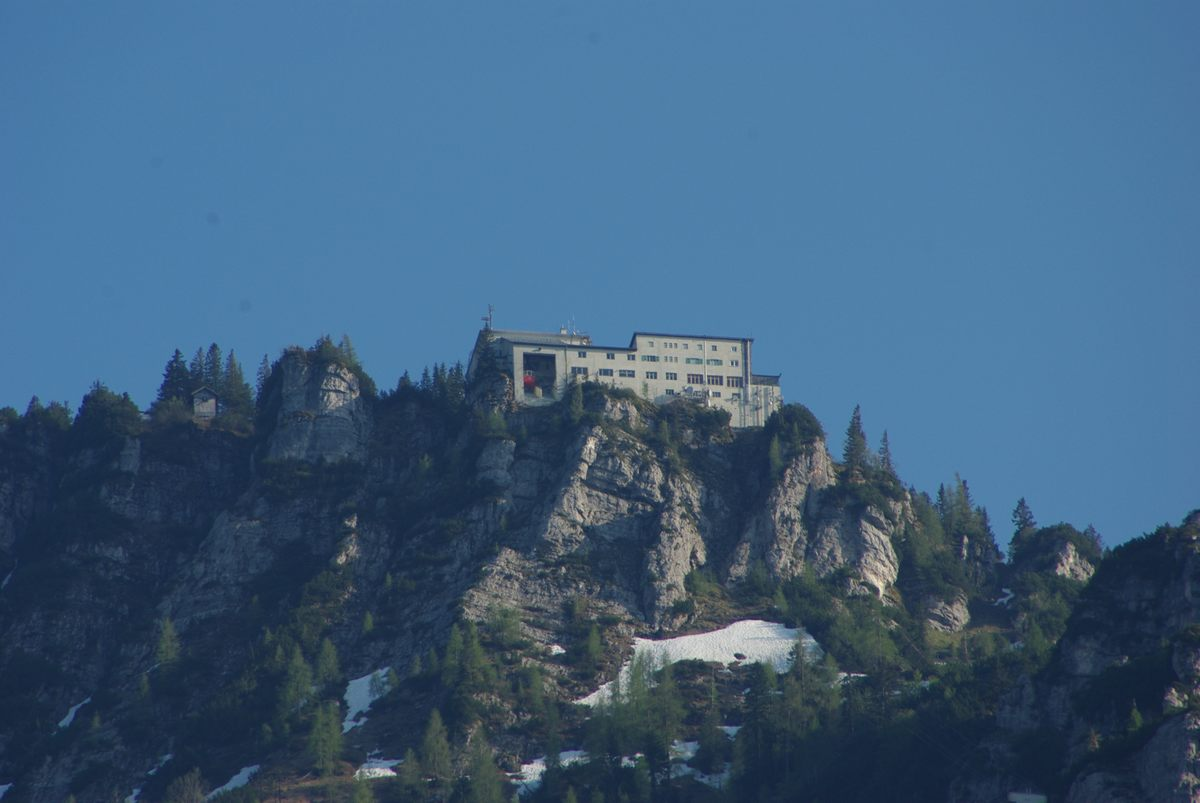
Mountain station and hotel

Since 2006, it is listed as a protected monument by the Bavarian State Office for Monument Protection. The Predigtstuhl cable car is also known as the "Grande Dame of the Alps" due to its age. The German newspaper Die Welt once named it one of the ten most spectacular cable cars in the world.

In early 2009, Predigtstuhlbahn GmbH had to file for insolvency, presumably due to financial irregularities on the part of one of its shareholders. At the beginning of 2013, the company was acquired by Josef und Marga Posch GmbH & Co. KG, which belongs to the Bad Reichenhall-based corporate group Max Aicher.

== Technical data ==
The Predigtstuhl Cable Car is a reversible aerial cableway with two cabins traveling synchronously uphill and downhill, operating in shuttle service. Each cabin runs on a separate track cable and is moved by one haul rope and one counter-haul rope. The downhill cabin pulls the other cabin uphill, thus ensuring maximum energy efficiency. The control and drive systems are located at the mountain station. The steeply routed cable line is approximately 2,400 m in length and supported by three concrete pylons, with a maximum span of almost 1,000 m.

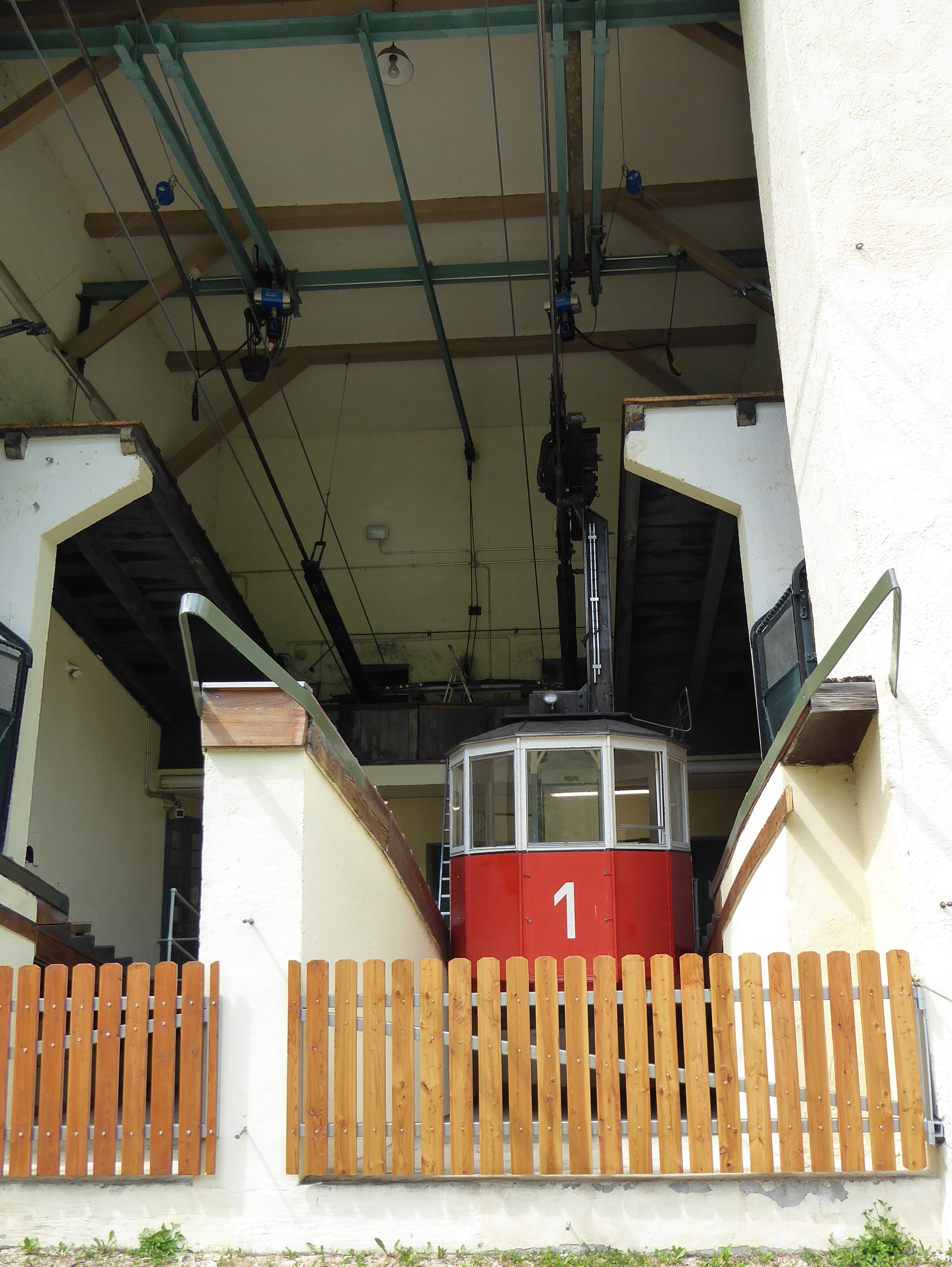
Cabin of the Predigtstuhl cable car at the valley station

=== Technical specifications ===
- Height of valley station: 474 m (1,555 ft)
- Height of mountain station: 1,614 m (5,295 ft)
- Height difference: 1,140 m (3,740 ft)
- Length: 2,380 m (1.48 miles)
- Maximum height above ground: 180 m (591 ft)
- Power: 150 hp
- Capacity: 150 persons/hour
- Passenger capacity: two 25-passenger cabins
- Speed: 18 km/h (11.2 mph)
- Journey time: 8.5 minutes

=== Museum ===
The museum at the mountain station presents the construction history, technical innovations, and original components of the cable car, illustrating its historical engineering significance. At the valley station, exhibits and information panels provide an overview of the history of the cable car, the mountain, and the surrounding region.

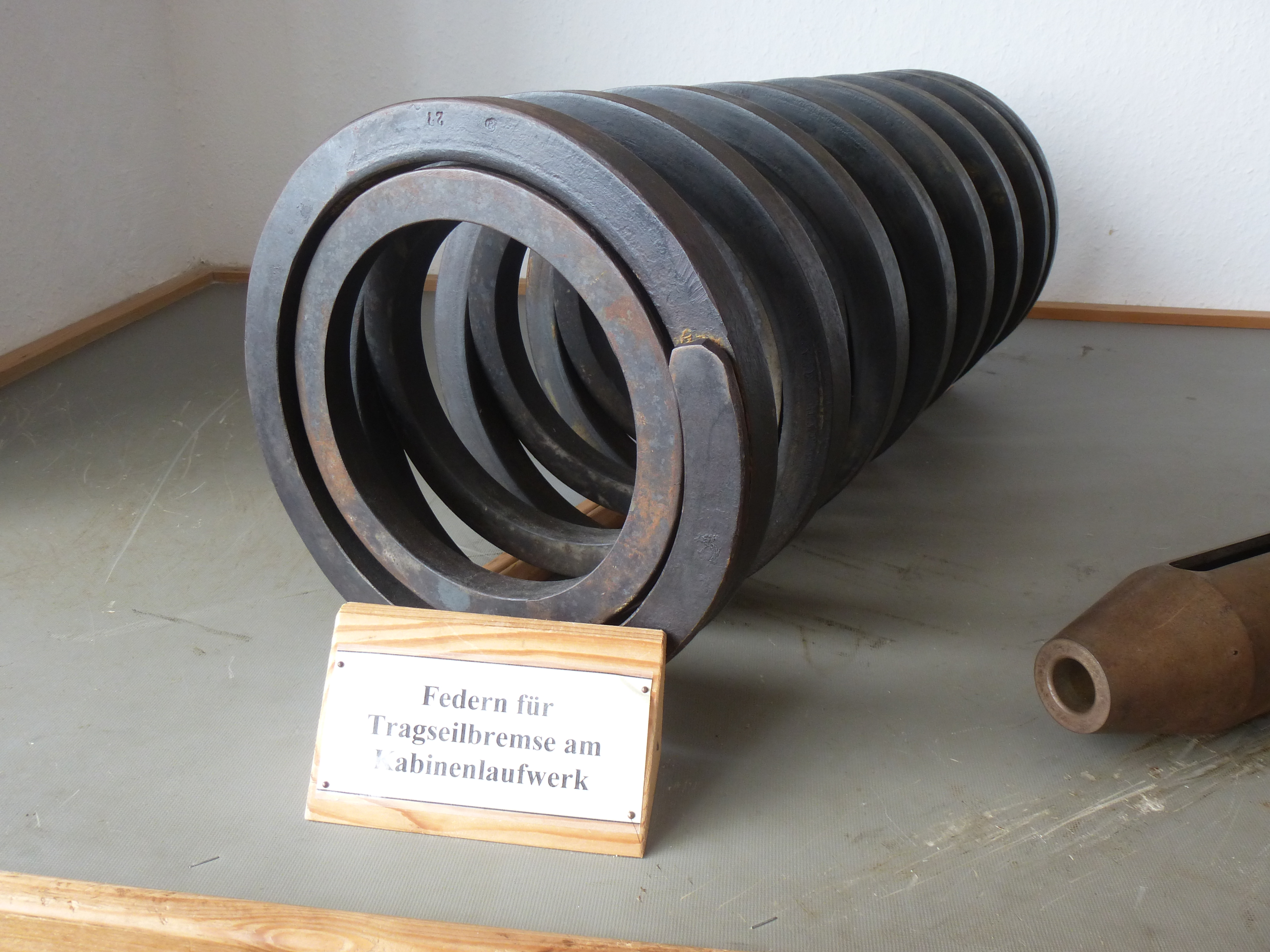
Springs for the cable brake of the gondolas

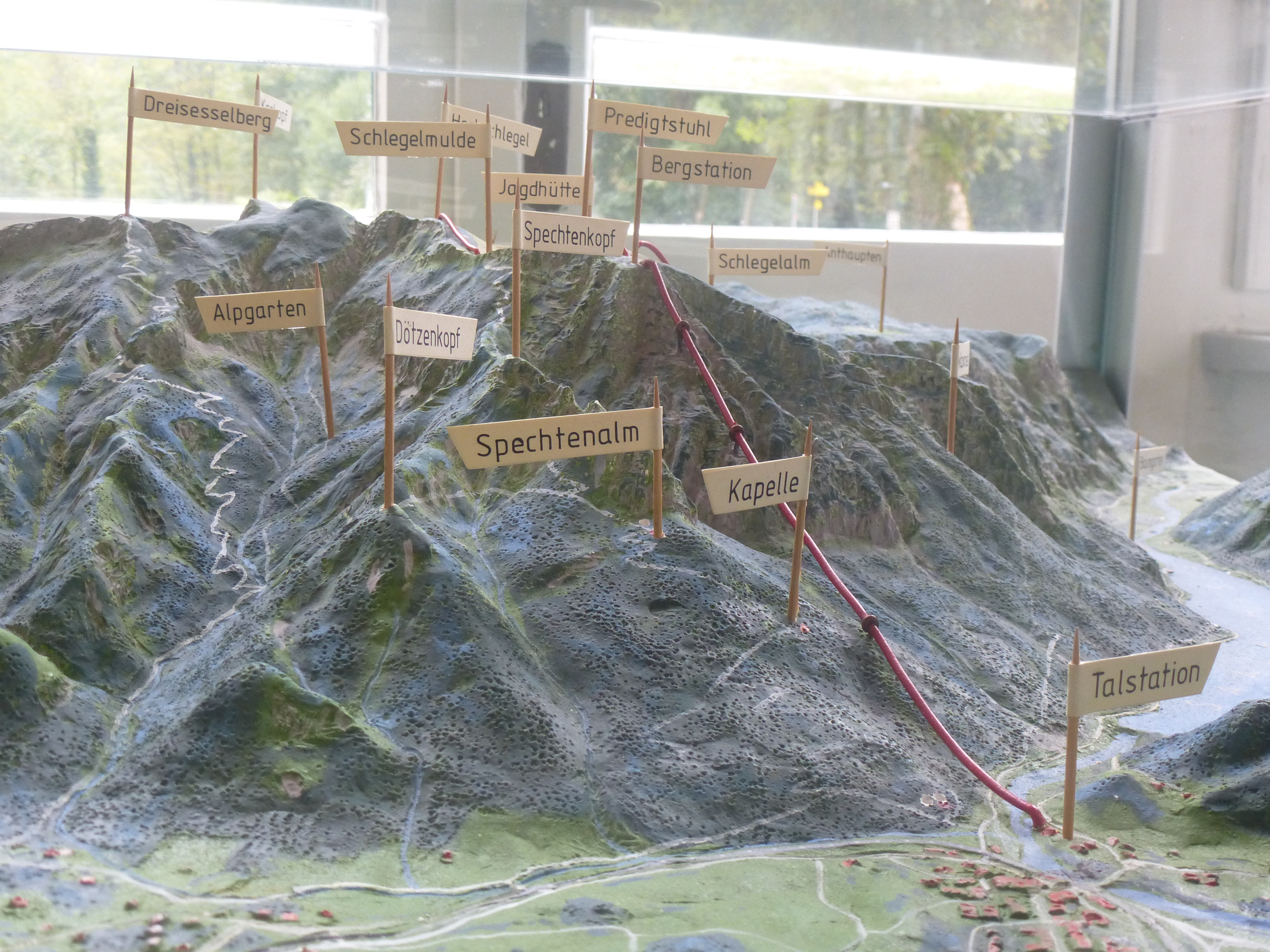
Model route of the Predigtstuhl cable car

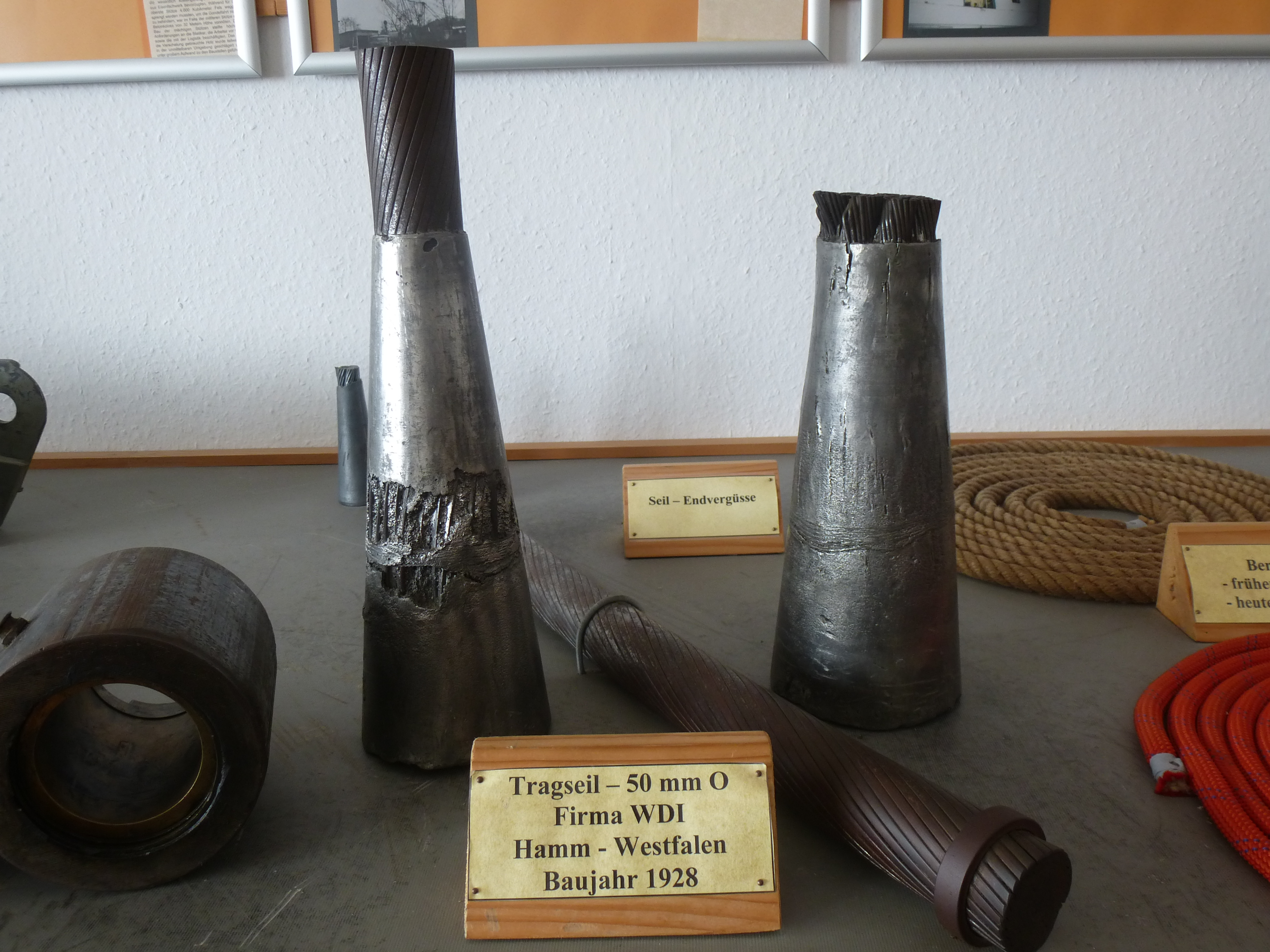
Support cable and potting cone

== Access ==
The valley station of the Predigtstuhlbahn is located at Max‑Aicher‑Platz 1 in Bad Reichenhall and can be reached by car via the B20/B21 bypass, where signposted parking is available directly at the station, with additional spaces a short walk uphill. Travelers arriving by train can use services of the Berchtesgadener Land Bahn, Deutsche Bahn, or the Austrian Federal Railways to the "Bad Reichenhall–Kirchberg" stop; from there, the valley station is approximately a five‑minute signposted walk across the river. The bus stop “Tiroler Tor/Predigtstuhlbahn,” located about a five‑minute walk from the valley station, is served by Bad Reichenhall city bus line 1, the regional RVO line 841, and the Austrian Postbus.

== Tourism and hospitality ==
=== Mountain restaurant and hotel ===
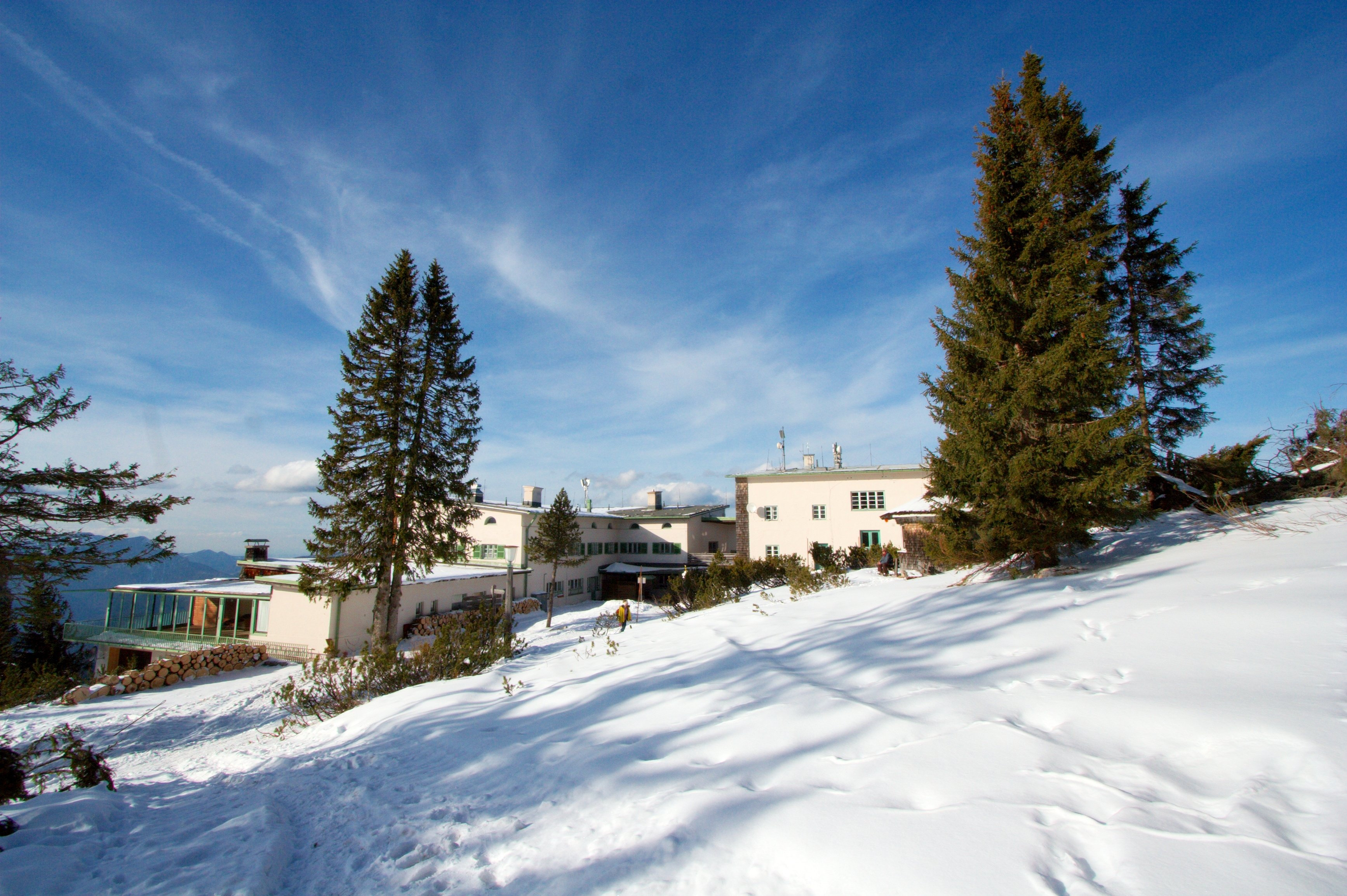
Mountain station and restaurant

Near the mountain station, a restaurant and a hotel were opened on October 6, 1928, at an altitude of 1,583 m (5,193 ft). The restaurant's terrace offers panoramic views of Bad Reichenhall and Salzburg, as well as the Chiemgau and Berchtesgaden Alps. Like the cable car itself, the restaurant building is a listed monument. The restaurant re-opened in 2014 after renovation work. Due to further necessary renovation work, the hotel has been closed since 2014.

In 2018, a registry office was added to the basement of the mountain restaurant. Its design echoes the original 1920s architectural style, known as Neue Sachlichkeit.

=== Almhütte Schlegelmulde ===
The alpine hut on the Schlegelmulde is situated at an elevation of 1,549 m (5,082 ft) and can be reached from the mountain station of the Predigtstuhl cable car in approximately 10 to 15 minutes. It is accessible via the "Bad Reichenhaller Höhenkurweg", a well-maintained walking path open all year round. The rustic alpine hut features a sun terrace, deck chairs, and a lounge with a fireplace, and serves traditional regional specialties.

== Leisure and sports ==
From the Predigtstuhlbahn mountain station in the Lattengebirge, several marked hiking routes and walking paths are accessible. These range from short summit walks to longer alpine routes across the ridge system.

Short walks and easy routes

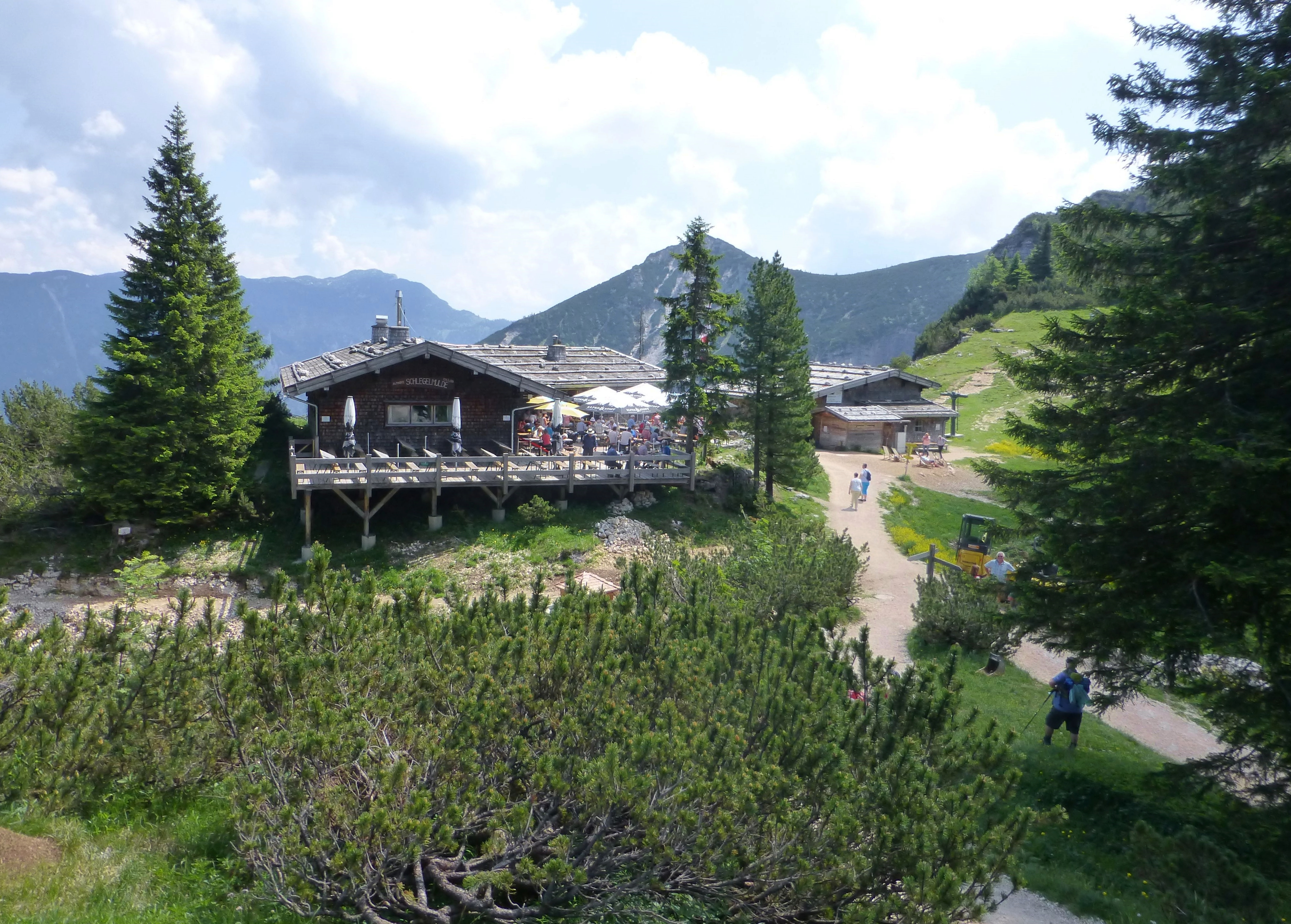
The Schlegelmulde alpine hut in the summer time

- Predigtstuhl summit walk: A short, signposted path leads from the mountain station to the Predigtstuhl summit, offering panoramic views of the Berchtesgadener Land and the Salzburg basin.
- Schlegelmulde: An easy walk from the mountain station to the Schlegelmulde alpine pasture area.

Longer and alpine routes

- Alpgartensteig (trail no. 477): This trail provides a longer ascent or descent through steep, forested terrain; it typically requires several hours and is recommended for experienced hikers.
- Toni-Michl-Steig via Dreisesselberg (trail nos. 477/479): This trail traverses ridge terrain north of the Predigtstuhl and connects to neighbouring summits such as Hochschlegel and Karkopf.
- Other paths lead toward the Lattengebirge from Hallthurm or Winkl via the Steinerne Agnes and from Schwarzbachwacht or Ramsau via the Moosensteig (no. 470) or Mordau-Alm (no. 479); these are longer mountain routes passing alpine landmarks and typically require good fitness.
- From the west, the Waxriessteig (no. 478) is a steeper climb linking lower valleys with the Predigtstuhl area.

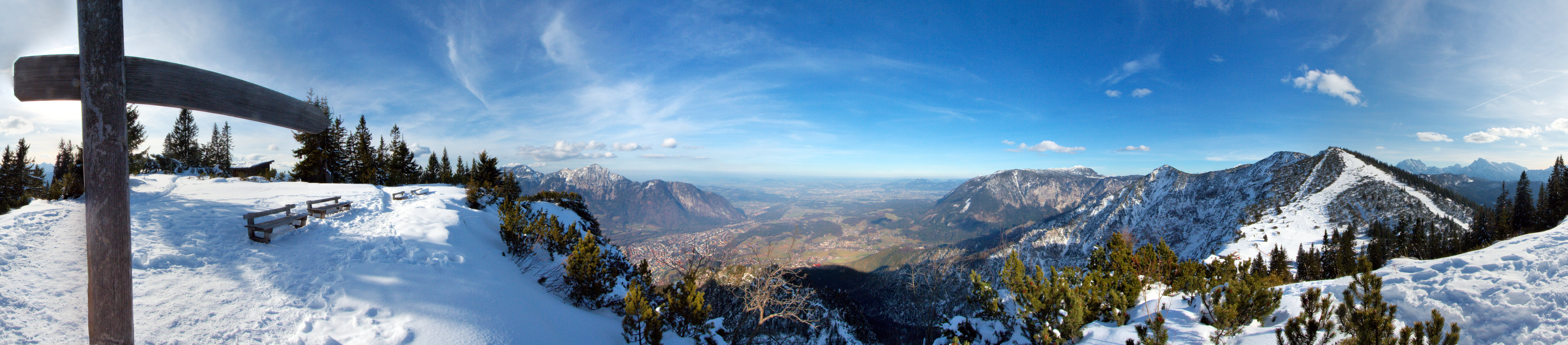
360° panoramic view from the summit of the Predigtstuhl

== See also ==
- List of aerial tramways
