= Dreisesselberg (Latten Mountains) =

Mountain in Bavaria, Germany

Coordinates: 47°41′29″N 12°53′51″E

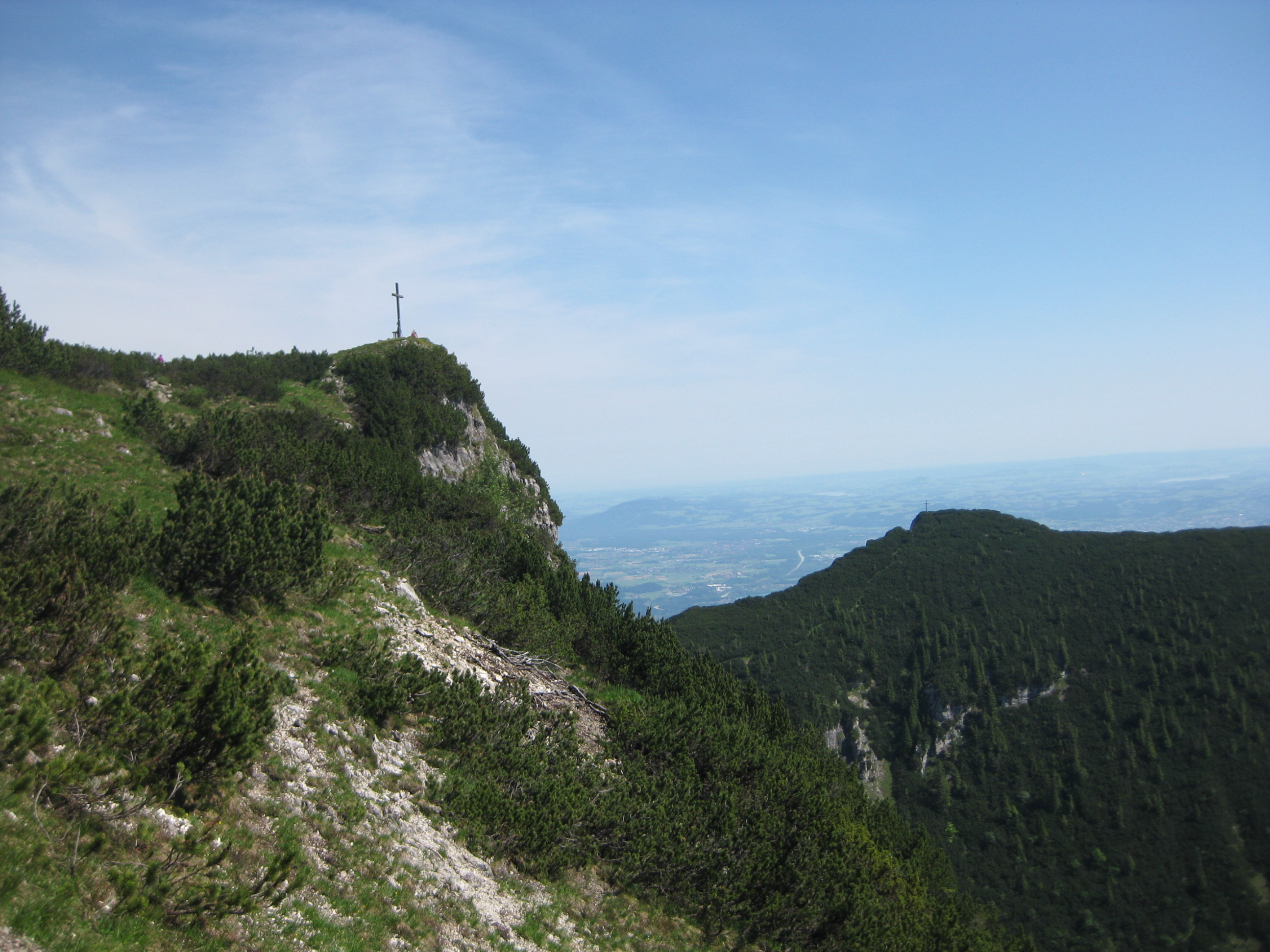
- In the foreground the Karkopf, in the background the Dreisesselberg

Highest point
- Elevation: 1,664 m (5,459 ft)

Geography
- Location: Bavaria, Germany

The Dreisesselberg is a mountain in Bavaria, Germany, in the mountain range Lattengebirge.
