= Nöchling =

- Municipality
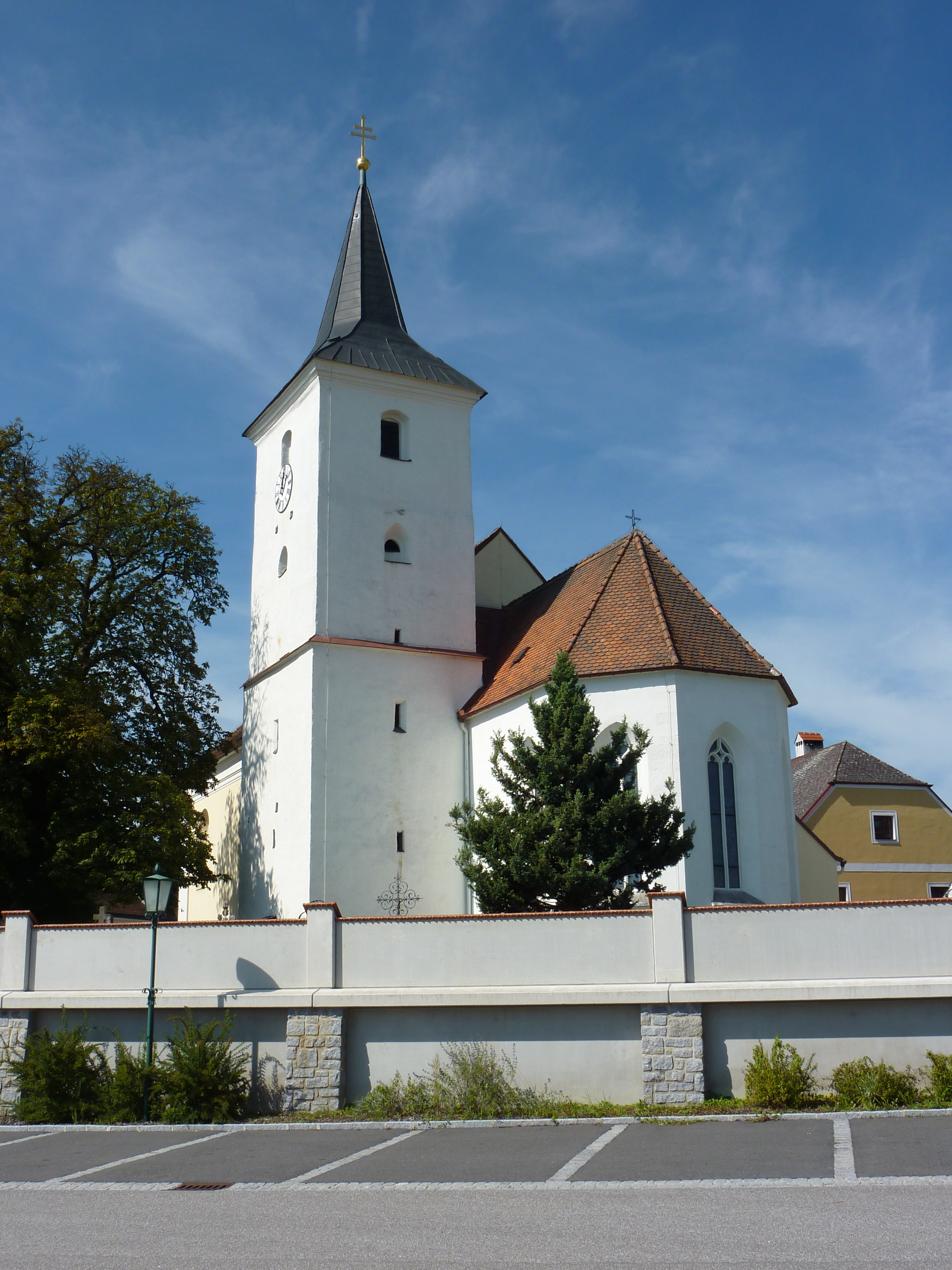
- Nöchling parish church

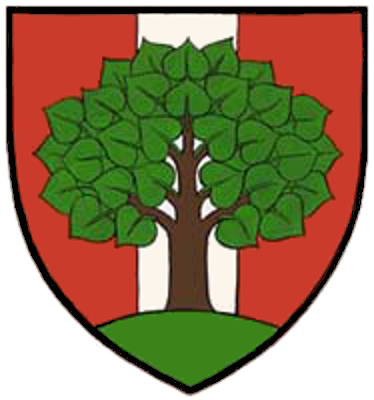
- Coat of arms

- Location within Austria
- Coordinates: 48°13′N 14°59′E
- Country: Austria
- State: Lower Austria
- District: Melk

Government
  - Mayor: Georg Strasser

Area
  - Total: 19.58 km^{2} (7.56 sq mi)
- Elevation: 533 m (1,749 ft)

Population (2018-01-01)
  - Total: 1,077
  - Density: 55.01/km^{2} (142.5/sq mi)
- Time zone: UTC+1 (CET)
  - Summer (DST): UTC+2 (CEST)
- Postal code: 3680
- Area code: 07414
- Website: https://www.noechling.gv.at/

Nöchling is a town in the district of Melk in the Austrian state of Lower Austria.

== Population ==
Historical population
Year	Pop.	±%
1971	905	—
1981	898	−0.8%
1991	951	+5.9%
2001	1,019	+7.2%
