= Bayerisch Gmain =

- Municipality
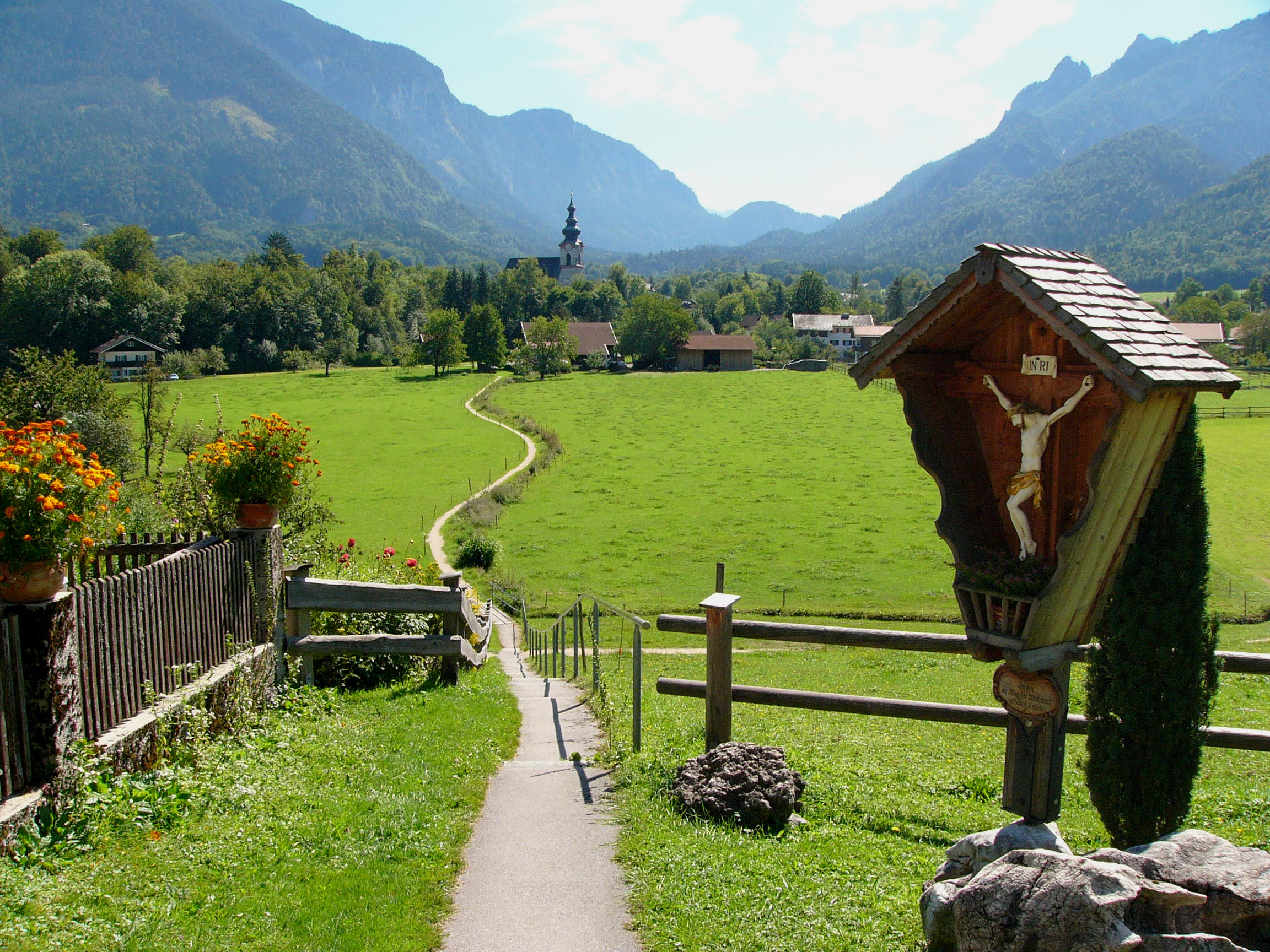

- Coat of arms

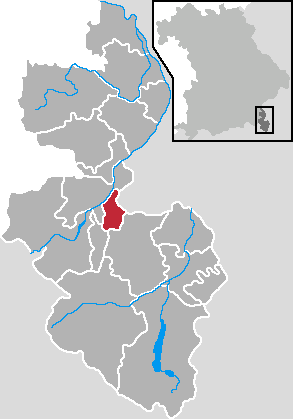
- Location of Bayerisch Gmain within Berchtesgadener Land district
- Interactive map of Bayerisch Gmain
- Location within Germany Location within Bavaria
- Coordinates: 47°43′N 12°54′E
- Country: Germany
- State: Bavaria
- Admin. region: Oberbayern
- District: Berchtesgadener Land

Government
  - Mayor (2019–25): Armin Wierer (FW)

Area
  - Total: 11.40 km^{2} (4.40 sq mi)
- Elevation: 540 m (1,770 ft)

Population (2025-12-31)
  - Total: 2,954
  - Density: 259.1/km^{2} (671.1/sq mi)
- Time zone: UTC+01:00 (CET)
  - Summer (DST): UTC+02:00 (CEST)
- Postal codes: 83457
- Dialling codes: 08651
- Vehicle registration: BGL
- Website: www.bayerisch-gmain.de

Bayerisch Gmain is a municipality and a village in the district of Berchtesgadener Land in Bavaria in Germany.

== History ==
“Auf der Gmain” is a name used for centuries for the settlement area between Untersberg and Lattengebirge, Hallthurm and Kirchholz.

Even the Bronze Age people appreciated the richness of the soil (salt in Reichenhall) and the favorable location of the surrounding area and settled here permanently. During Roman times, the area was called Mona, from which the name "Gmain" developed. The place name first appears in connection with a donation from the Bavarian Duke Theotpert (reigned c. 711–716) to Nonnberg Abbey in Salzburg in 712. Around 1100, the Counts of Plain appear, who, with the construction of Plainburg Castle, made the Gmain area the center of the upper county in the Salzburg region. Despite the territorial border, which divided the widely scattered farms into a Bavarian and a Salzburgian half after the decline of Plain's rule even before 1300 (around 1295), the village community was always perceived by the inhabitants as a single entity.

The former ducal Bavarian catchment area of the municipality thus socio-culturally distinguishes itself within the district of Berchtesgadener Land from its southern region of Berchtesgadener Land within the historical borders of the prince-provost's core territory and at the same time formed a link to the former Archbishopric of Salzburg.

In the practice of religious life, the unity of canon law formed a community-building foundation for all the inhabitants of Gmain. Regarding the economic structure, cultural life in general, and schooling in particular, the state border along the Weißbach stream played virtually no role. The numerous family ties across the border also naturally formed a strong bond. The only dividing line was the Salzburg and Bavarian jurisdiction, which ended at the Weißbach and established the different sovereignties.

The separation of the two towns only gained real significance from 1816 onwards, when, after a brief period of unity under Bavarian administration, the political differences became increasingly pronounced throughout the 19th century. Despite the formation of two independent municipalities, a sense of community remained. Shared economic interests, particularly in tourism, contributed to this, as did the practicality of shared technical facilities. The special appeal – and also an obligation – lies in preserving their shared historical heritage despite the independence that has since developed.

On December 1, 1905, part of the dissolved municipality of Sankt Zeno was incorporated, namely the hamlet of Leopoldstal, a small exclave of Sankt Zeno east of the Kirchholz on the Weißbach.

On November 10, 1926, the municipality of Gmain was renamed to its current name.

After the end of World War II, there were numerous children among the displaced persons without parents or relatives. For them, the US occupation authorities established over two dozen children's centers, administered by the UNRRA and, from 1947, by the International Refugee Organization (IRO). One of these was located in Bayerisch Gmain in the former Hotel Am Forst, which became the Jehuda Makabi Children's Center. It operated from the summer of 1946 to the summer of 1948 and initially housed 210 children, eventually reducing the number to 143. It included a football club, a kindergarten, a primary school, and a vocational school. Twelve of these children appeared in Fred Zinnemann's film The Search, which Zinnemann himself had selected in Bayerisch Gmain. The children's home in Bayerisch Gmain was officially under the auspices of the UN relief organization, and its staff and residents were involved in Zionist youth organizations. Consequently, the vast majority of the children emigrated to Palestine or Israel. After the children and young people moved out, the International Refugee Organization (IRO) operated a rehabilitation center for Jewish tuberculosis patients in the building from the summer of 1948.

In 1961, the municipality still covered an area of 779 hectares. It reached its current size as part of the Bavarian regional reform through the incorporation of the northern part of the former unincorporated area of Forst Sankt Zeno (261.80 hectares) in the late 1970s, which consolidated the municipal boundaries, and through a further incorporation: On January 1, 1981, the unincorporated area of Kirchholz, located to the north, was dissolved, and almost two-thirds of it (96.13 out of 155.29 hectares) was incorporated into Bayerisch Gmain. Only Forst St. Zeno remains a separate, second cadastral district within the municipality. The other incorporated areas (Leopoldstal, Kirchholz) belong to the cadastral district of Bayerisch Gmain (972.55 hectares).

When the unincorporated area of Bischofswiesener Forst, bordering to the south, was dissolved on the cut-off date of January 1, 2010, part of this area was incorporated into the municipality and district of Bayerisch Gmain.

== Heraldry ==
| Coat of arms of Bayerisch Gmain | Blazon: Divided; the top lozenge of silver and blue, the bottom in red two horizontal silver fish one above the other. |

== Notable residents ==
- Hans Erlwein (1872–1914), architect, town councilor in Bamberg and Dresden
- Claire Waldoff (1884–1957), cabaret artist, singer, lived from 1939 until her death in Bayerisch Gmain
- Ines Papert (born 1974), German sport climber and ice climbing champion
- Johannes Frießner (1892-1971) German Commander of XXIII Army Corps during World War Two
