= 2013 Winter Military World Games =

Sports competition

II Winter Military World Games Jeux mondiaux militaires d'hiver de 2013
- Host city: Annecy, France
- Nations: 40
- Events: 36 in 8 sports
- Opening: 24 March 2013
- Closing: 30 March 2013

Winter

Summer

The 2nd CISM World Winter Games were held in Annecy, France from 24–30 March 2013.

== Participating nations ==
Overall, athletes from 40 countries participated.

- Afghanistan
- Albania
- Austria
- Belgium
- Bosnia and Herzegovina
- Brazil
- Bulgaria
- Chile
- China
- Cyprus
- Czech Republic
- Ecuador
- Estonia
- Finland
- France
- Georgia
- Germany
- Iran
- Italy
- Kazakhstan
- Latvia
- Lebanon
- Lithuania
- Morocco
- Netherlands
- North Macedonia
- Norway
- Pakistan
- Poland
- Romania
- Russia
- Serbia
- Slovakia
- Slovenia
- South Korea
- Spain
- Sweden
- Switzerland
- Ukraine
- United States

== Medal table ==
The host countries are highlighted in lavender blue.

Rank	Nation	Gold	Silver	Bronze	Total
1	France*	12	7	11	30
2	Italy	11	10	3	24
3	Switzerland	6	3	3	12
4	Russia	5	6	3	14
5	Austria	2	4	3	9
6	China	2	1	2	5
7	Slovenia	1	2	2	5
8	Germany	0	2	4	6
9	Bulgaria	0	1	0	1
9	Norway	0	1	0	1
11	Kazakhstan	0	0	4	4
12	Czech Republic	0	0	1	1
12	Finland	0	0	1	1
12	Sweden	0	0	1	1
Totals (14 entries)		39	37	38	114

== Medal winners ==
=== Alpine skiing ===
==== Men ====
Event	Gold		Silver		Bronze	
Slalom	Giuliano Razzoli; Italy	1:39.52	Maxime Tissot; France	1:40.17	Marco Tumler; Switzerland	1:40.59
Giant slalom	Manuel Pleisch; Switzerland	2:05.31	Massimiliano Blardone; Italy	2:05.68	Marc Berthod; Switzerland	2:06.05
Team slalom	Switzerland; Marco Tumler; Manuel Pleisch; Gino Caviezel	5:02.89	Austria; Stefan Brennsteiner; Martin Bischof; Matthias Tippelreither	5:05.85	France; Maxime Tissot; Steve Missillier; Adrien Théaux	5:06.87
Team giant slalom	Italy; Massimiliano Blardone; Michael Gufler; Cristian Deville	6:18.43	Switzerland; Manuel Pleisch; Marc Berthod; Marco Tumler	6:18.79	France; Steve Missillier; Maxime Tissot; Adrien Théaux	6:24.23

==== Women ====
Event	Gold		Silver		Bronze	
Slalom	Michela Azzola; Italy	1:44.64	Anémone Marmottan; France	1:45.33	Fanny Chmelar; Germany	1:45.39
Giant slalom	Elena Curtoni; Italy	2:08.32	Tessa Worley; France	2:08.46	Anémone Marmottan; France	2:09.93
Team slalom	Italy; Michela Azzola; Elena Curtoni; Sarah Pardeller	5:16.43	France; Anémone Marmottan; Marion Bertrand; Tessa Worley	5:19.17	Germany; Fanny Chmelar; Maren Wiesler; Anne Kissling	5:20.12
Team giant slalom	France; Tessa Worley; Anémone Marmottan; Marion Bertrand	6:29.82	Italy; Elena Curtoni; Camilla Borsotti; Sarah Pardeller	6:32.14	Austria; Julia Dygruber; Bernadette Schild; Lisa-Maria Zeller	6:37.11

=== Biathlon ===
==== Men ====
Event	Gold		Silver		Bronze	
10 km sprint	Lukas Hofer; Italy	24:48.7 (0+0)	Benjamin Weger; Switzerland	25:12.1 (0+0)	Simon Fourcade; France	25:27.9 (0+0)
10 km team sprint	Switzerland; Benjamin Weger; Mario Dolder; Claudio Böckli	1:17:18.68	Italy; Lukas Hofer; Markus Windisch; Dominik Windisch	1:17:58.72	France; Simon Fourcade; Martin Fourcade; Simon Desthieux	1:18:26.58
25 km patrol race	Switzerland; Benjamin Weger; Remo Fischer; Mario Dolder; Ivan Joller	1:06:38.53	Austria; Dominik Landertinger; Michael Reiter; Peter Brunner; Johannes Dürr	1:07:26.69	Italy; Lukas Hofer; Christian Martinelli; Markus Windisch; Dominik Windisch	1:07:58.01

==== Women ====
Event	Gold		Silver		Bronze	
7,5 km sprint	Marine Bolliet; France	21:12.3 (0+0)	Karin Oberhofer; Italy	21:15.3 (0+1)	Michela Ponza; Italy	21:20.7 (0+0)
7,5 km team sprint	Italy; Karin Oberhofer; Michela Ponza; Dorothea Wierer	1:04:34.21	France; Marine Bolliet; Anaïs Bescond; Sophie Boilley	1:05:01.07	Germany; Evi Sachenbacher-Stehle; Helena Gnaedinger; Carolin Hennecke	1:08:19.70
15 km patrol race	France; Anaïs Bescond; Marine Bolliet; Coraline Hugue; Sophie Boilley	44:22.0	Italy; Michela Ponza; Dorothea Wierer; Karin Oberhofer; Nicole Gontier	45:24,1	Sweden; Elin Mattsson; Emelie Larsson; Mona Brorsson; Maria Gräfnings	45:55.3

=== Cross-country skiing ===
==== Men ====
Event	Gold		Silver		Bronze	
15 km free style	Robin Duvillard; France	37:37.3	Ivan Perrillat Boiteux; France	37:43.0	Mathias Wibault; France	37:55.8
15 km free style team	France; Robin Duvillard; Ivan Perrillat Boiteux; Mathias Wibault	1:53:16.13	Switzerland; Jonas Baumann; Dario Cologna; Remo Fischer	1:57:43.52	Austria; Johannes Dürr; Bernhard Tritscher; Max Hauke	1:59:08.23
Team sprint	Switzerland; Jonas Baumann; Gianluca Cologna	16:11.8	Austria; Max Hauke; Bernhard Tritscher	16:12.3	Czech Republic; Martin Jakš; Dušan Kožíšek	16:12.7

==== Women ====
Event	Gold		Silver		Bronze	
10 km free style	Coraline Hugue; France	29:42.7	Anaïs Bescond; France	29:44.9	Anouk Faivre-Picon; France	30:38.1
10 km free style team	France; Coraline Hugue; Anaïs Bescond; Anouk Faivre-Picon	1:30:05.7	Russia; Svetlana Nikolaeva; Natalja Iljina; Natalya Korostelyova	1:34:01.8	Kazakhstan; Marina Matrossova; Elena Kolomina; Tatyana Ossipova	1:34:02.1
Team sprint	France; Anouk Faivre-Picon; Célia Aymonier	18:28.9	Russia; Natalja Iljina; Svetlana Nikolaeva	18:30.2	Kazakhstan; Marina Matrossova; Elena Kolomina	18:38.4

=== Short track ===
==== Men ====
Event	Gold		Silver		Bronze	
500 m	Song Weilong; China	42.651	Nie Xin; China	42.692	Maxime Chataignier; France	51.532
1500 m	Nie Xin; China	2.16.337	Christoph Schubert; Germany	2.16.431	Song Weilong; China	2.16.531

==== Women ====
Event	Gold		Silver		Bronze	
500 m	Arianna Fontana; Italy	44.066	Martina Valcepina; Italy	44.148	Veronika Windisch; Austria	45.754
1500 m	Arianna Fontana; Italy	2.37.365	Martina Valcepina; Italy	2.37.468	Sun Huizhu; China	2.37.571

=== Ski mountaineering ===
==== Men ====
Event	Gold		Silver		Bronze	
Individual	Matteo Eydallin; Italy Alexis Sévennec-Verdier; France	1:15:37.5 1:15:37.5	Not awarded as there was a tie for gold.		Robert Antonioli; Italy	1:16:47.8
Relay	Italy; Manfred Reichegger; Matteo Eydallin	39:23.5	Italy; Robert Antonioli; Damiano Lenzi	39:24.0	France; Tony Sbalbi; Alexis Sévennec-Verdier	41:05.5

==== Women ====
Event	Gold		Silver		Bronze	
Individual	Laëtitia Roux; France	1:27:52.0	Gloriana Pellissier; Italy	1:31:56.6	Valentine Fabre-Malavoy; France	1:38:23.6
Relay	France; Valentine Fabre-Malavoy; Laëtitia Roux	47:13.0	Italy; Gloriana Pellissier; Lorenza Bettega	52:30.2	Germany; Beatrice Soyter; Christin Spindler	58:33.7

=== Ski orienteering ===
==== Men ====
Event	Gold		Silver		Bronze	
Middle	Eduard Khrennikov; Russia	00:46:34	Stanimir Belomazhev; Bulgaria	00:48:27	Vadim Tolstopyatov; Russia	00:50:28
Relay	Russia; Eduard Khrennikov; Vadim Tolstopyatov; Egor Zorin	1:39:59	Norway; Eivind Tonna; Ola Berger; Eirik Watterdal	1:44:36	Finland; Lauri Nenonen; Tero Linnainmaa; Tuomas Kotro	1:52:15

==== Women ====
Event	Gold		Silver		Bronze	
Middle	Natalia Tomilova; Russia	00:44:57	Natalia Naumova; Russia	00:48:02	Élodie Bourgeois-Pin; France	00:48:33
Relay	France; Élodie Bourgeois-Pin; Charlotte Bouchet; Fanny Roche	1:56:11	Russia; Natalia Tomilova; Natalia Naumova; Tatiana Vlasova	1:57:38	Kazakhstan; Mariya Vlassova; Elmira Moldasheva; Riana Khassanova	3:00:53

=== Sport climbing ===
==== Men ====
Event	Gold		Silver		Bronze	
Lead	Klemen Bečan; Slovenia	39.5+	Markus Hoppe; Germany	37.0+	Benjamin Blaser; Switzerland	32.0+
Bouldering	Jakob Schubert; Austria		Kilian Fischhuber; Austria		Klemen Bečan; Slovenia	
Speed	Benjamin Blaser; Switzerland	18.08 (F)	Klemen Bečan; Slovenia	19.55 (F)	Nikita Devyaterikov; Kazakhstan	21.91 (F)

==== Women ====
Event	Gold		Silver		Bronze	
Lead	Evgeniya Malamid; Russia	29.0	Mina Markovič; Slovenia	28.0+	Yana Chereshneva; Russia	28.0+
Bouldering	Anna Stöhr; Austria		Evgeniya Malamid; Russia		Mina Markovič; Slovenia	
Speed	Yana Chereshneva; Russia	20.44 (F)	Alina Gaidamakina; Russia	24.19 (F)	Evgeniya Malamid; Russia	32.64 (F)
