= Lyndsay Meyer =

American ski mountaineer (born 1973)

Personal information
- Born: December 26, 1973 (age 52) Minnetonka, Minnesota, United States

Sport
- Sport: Skiing
Medal record
Representing United States

Lyndsay Meyer (born December 26, 1973) is an American ski mountaineer.

Maeyer was born in Minnetonka, Minnesota, and attended the Blake School, before she studied at Colgate University. She lives in Aspen, Colorado.

== Selected results ==
- 2009:
  - 8th, Pierra Menta, together with Nina Cook Silitch
  - 10th, Trofeo Mezzalama, together with Chantal Daucourt and Cécile Pasche
- 2010:
  - 3rd, Zermatt-Rothorn run
  - 7th, Patrouille des Glaciers, together with Nina Cook Silitch and Monique Merrill
  - 9th, Pierra Menta, together with Nina Cook Silitch
- 2011:
  - 5th USA National Championships in Jackson Hole
  - 2nd, Power of Four, Aspen Mountain, women's team, together with Jessica Phillips
  - 6th, Trofeo Mezzalama, together with Nina Cook Silitch and Valentine Fabre
- 2012:
  - 2nd Power of Four with Sari Anderson
  - 4th, North American Championship, sprint
  - 8th, North American Championship, individual
  - 8th, North American Championship, total ranking
- 2013
  - 2nd Power of Four with Jari Kirkland
  - 1st America's Uphill
  - 3rd Matterhorn Ultraks with Melanie Bernier and Janelle Smiley
  - 1st Mezzalama mixed coed team with Stevie Kremer and Marshall Thompson
