= Grassl =

Grassl or Graßl is an Upper German and Austrian family name, mainly widespread in the southern region of the Berchtesgadener Land district, especially in the municipalities Ramsau bei Berchtesgaden and Schönau am Königsee. Notable people with the surname include:

- Andreas Grassl (born 1984), German man found in England
- Daniel Grassl (born 2002), Italian figure skater
- Florian Grassl (born 1980), German skeleton racer
- Franz Graßl (born 1965), German ski mountaineer
- Judith Graßl (born 1968), German ski mountaineer
- Wolfgang Graßl (1970-2010), German skier
