= Thoni =

Thoni or Thöni is a surname. Notable people with the surname include:

- Dietmar Thöni (born 1968), Austrian alpine skier
- Gustav Thöni (born 1951), Italian alpine ski racer
- Reiner Thoni (born 1984), Canadian ski mountaineer
- Roland Thöni (1950–2021), Italian alpine ski racer
