= Berchtesgaden =

Municipality in Bavaria, Germany

Berchtesgaden Berchtsgoan (Bavarian)
- Municipality
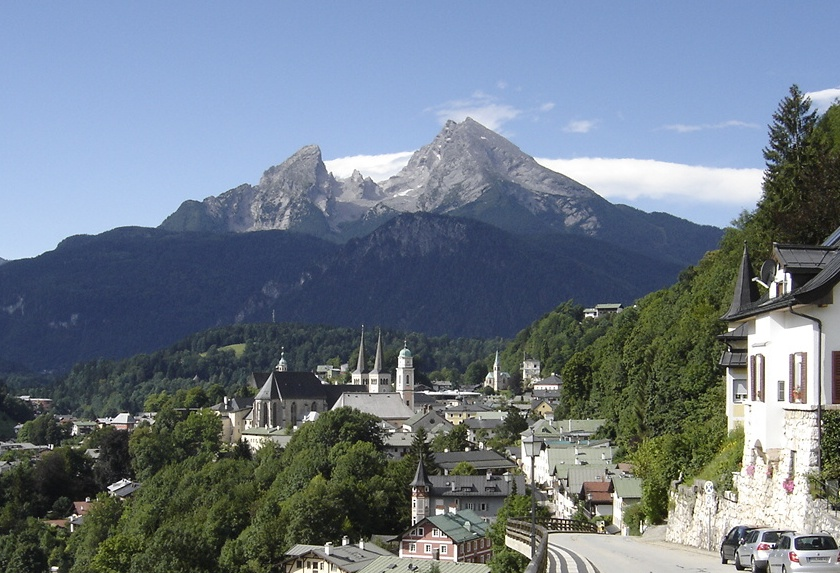
- Berchtesgaden and the Watzmann in August 2010

- Coat of arms

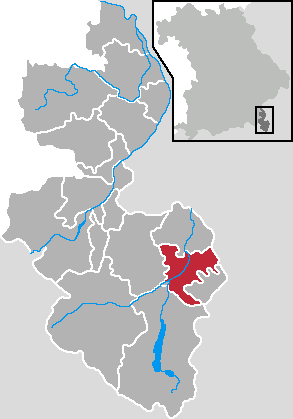
- Location of Berchtesgaden within Berchtesgadener Land district
- Interactive map of Berchtesgaden
- Location within Germany Location within Bavaria
- Coordinates: 47°37′53″N 13°0′15″E
- Country: Germany
- State: Bavaria
- Admin. region: Oberbayern
- District: Berchtesgadener Land

Government
  - Mayor (2020–26): Franz Rasp (CSU)

Area
  - Total: 35.63 km^{2} (13.76 sq mi)
- Elevation: 700 m (2,300 ft)

Population (2025-12-31)
  - Total: 7,697
  - Density: 216.0/km^{2} (559.5/sq mi)
- Time zone: UTC+01:00 (CET)
  - Summer (DST): UTC+02:00 (CEST)
- Postal codes: 83471
- Dialling codes: 08652
- Vehicle registration: BGL
- Website: www.gemeinde.berchtesgaden.de

Berchtesgaden (German pronunciation: [ˈbɛɐ̯çtəsˌɡaːdn̩]; Bavarian: Berchtsgoan) is a municipality in the district Berchtesgadener Land, Bavaria, in southeastern Germany, near the border with Austria, 30 km (19 mi) south of Salzburg and 180 km (110 mi) southeast of Munich. It lies in the Berchtesgaden Alps. South of the town, the Berchtesgaden National Park stretches along three parallel valleys.

The Kehlstein mountain (1,835 m or 6,020 ft), with its Kehlsteinhaus (Eagle's Nest), is located in the area.

== Etymology ==
The name was recorded in 1121 as Perehtgeresgadem. The first element is a masculine personal name, Per(c)htger, while the second is the word gadem, meaning "one-roomed house".

== History ==
The first known record of the area, from 1102, mentions the area's rich salt deposits. Salt mining began in the area in 1517, and subsequently produced much of Berchtesgaden's wealth.

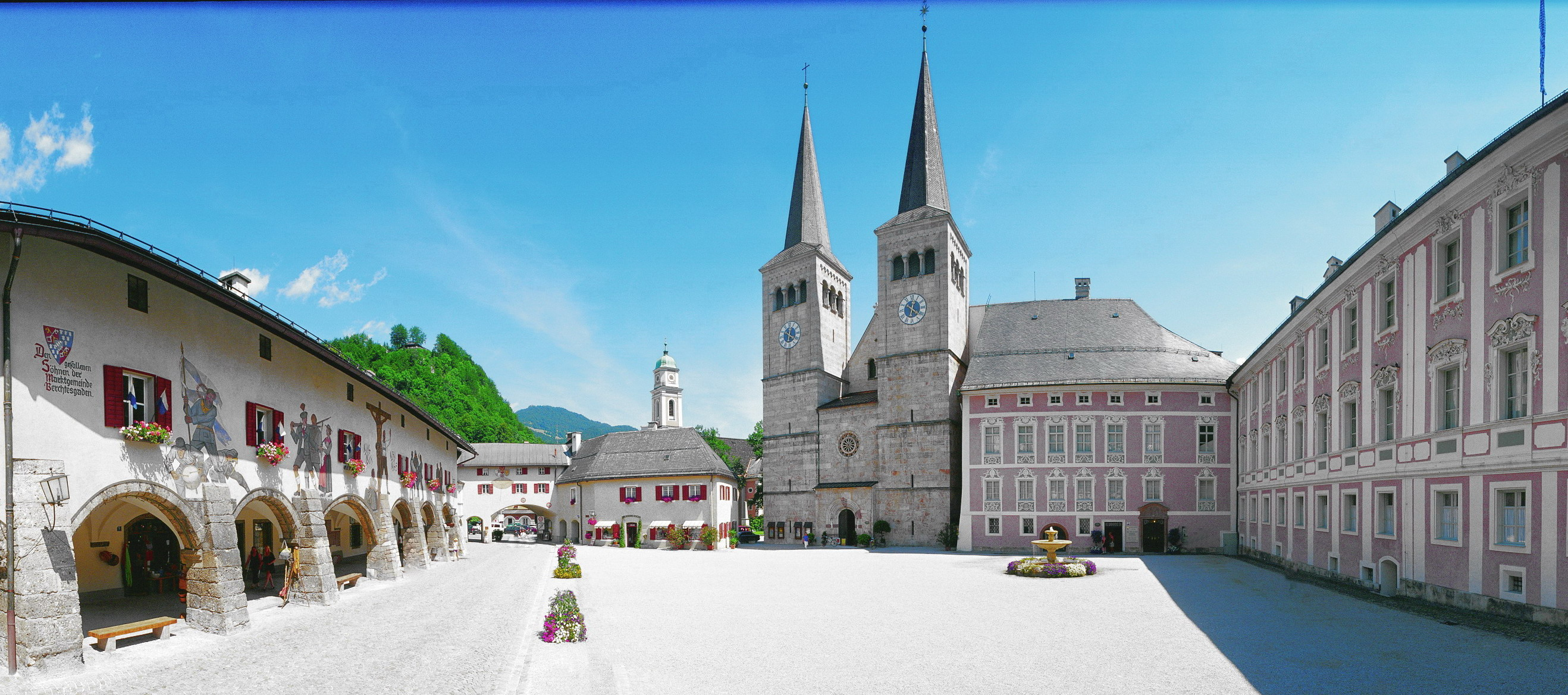
The former Royal Palace at Berchtesgaden, originally an Augustinian monastery

The town and its surroundings belonged to the Berchtesgaden Provostry, an independent state of the Holy Roman Empire (called Fürstpropstei Berchtesgaden) and was ruled by the Prince-provost of the Augustinian monastery in the town. It remained independent until the Reichsdeputationshauptschluss in 1803. During the Napoleonic Wars, Berchtesgaden changed hands a few times, such as in 1805 under the Treaty of Pressburg, when the area was ceded to Austria.

Berchtesgaden came under the rule of the Kingdom of Bavaria in 1810. It soon became popular with the Bavarian royal family, the House of Wittelsbach, who often visited Königssee and maintained a hunting residence in the former Augustinian monastery (still used today by Franz, Duke of Bavaria). Tourism began to evolve, and several artists came to the area, which reportedly gave rise to Malereck ("painters' corner") on the shore of the Königssee in nearby Schönau am Königssee. The most famous author who lived in Berchtesgaden was Ludwig Ganghofer.

=== Nazi era ===
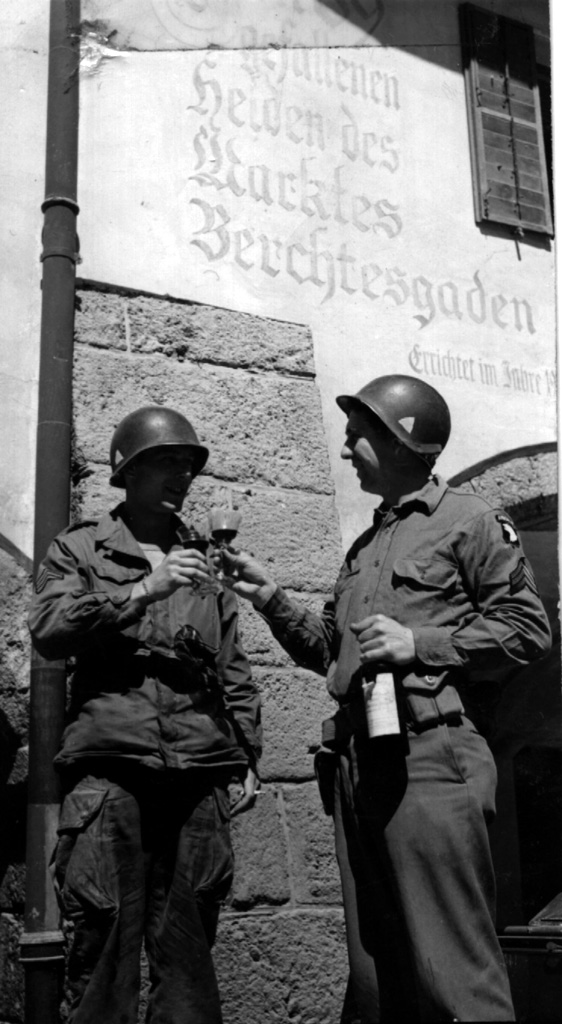
U.S. soldiers toast the capture of Berchtesgaden (1945).

Adolf Hitler began vacationing in the Berchtesgaden area in the 1920s. He purchased a home in the Obersalzberg above the town on the flank of the Hoher Goll and began extensive renovations on his Berghof in the following years. As other top Third Reich figures, such as Hermann Göring, Joseph Goebbels, Martin Bormann, Heinrich Himmler, and Albert Speer, began to frequent the area, the Nazi Party began to purchase and requisition land in the Obersalzberg.

To serve as an outpost of the German Reichskanzlei (Imperial Chancellery), Berchtesgaden and its environs (Stanggass) saw substantial expansion of offices, security, and support services, mainly on the Obersalzberg. Included in the town were a new railway station, with a reception area for Hitler and his guests, and an adjacent post office. The Berchtesgadener Hof Hotel, where famous visitors such as Neville Chamberlain and David Lloyd George stayed, was substantially upgraded.

Berchtesgaden was where Hitler met Chamberlain in 1938 before the Munich Agreement.

Even though a feared Alpine Fortress last stand of the Nazi regime in the Alps failed to materialize late in World War II, the Allies launched a devastating air raid on the Berchtesgaden area in the spring of 1945. The April 25 bombing of Obersalzberg did not damage the town. On 4 May 1945, forward elements of the 7th Infantry Regiment of the 3rd Infantry Division arrived and received the town's surrender.

=== Post–World War II ===
After the war, Berchtesgaden became a military zone and most of its buildings were requisitioned by the U.S. Army. Hotel Platterhof was rebuilt and renamed the General Walker Hotel in 1952. It served as a U.S. Armed Forces Recreation Center through the Cold War and beyond. Remnants of homes of former Nazi leaders were demolished in the early postwar years, though traces of some remained. In 1995, fifty years after the end of World War II and five years after German reunification, the AFRC Berchtesgaden was turned over to Bavarian authorities to facilitate military spending reductions mandated within the Base Realignment and Closure program by the U.S. Congress and Pentagon during the administration of President Bill Clinton. The General Walker Hotel was demolished in 2000–2001.

In 1986, Berchtesgaden was a first-round candidate city to host the XVI Olympic Winter Games to be held in 1992. The vote eventually went to Albertville, France, in October of that year.

=== Berchtesgaden today ===
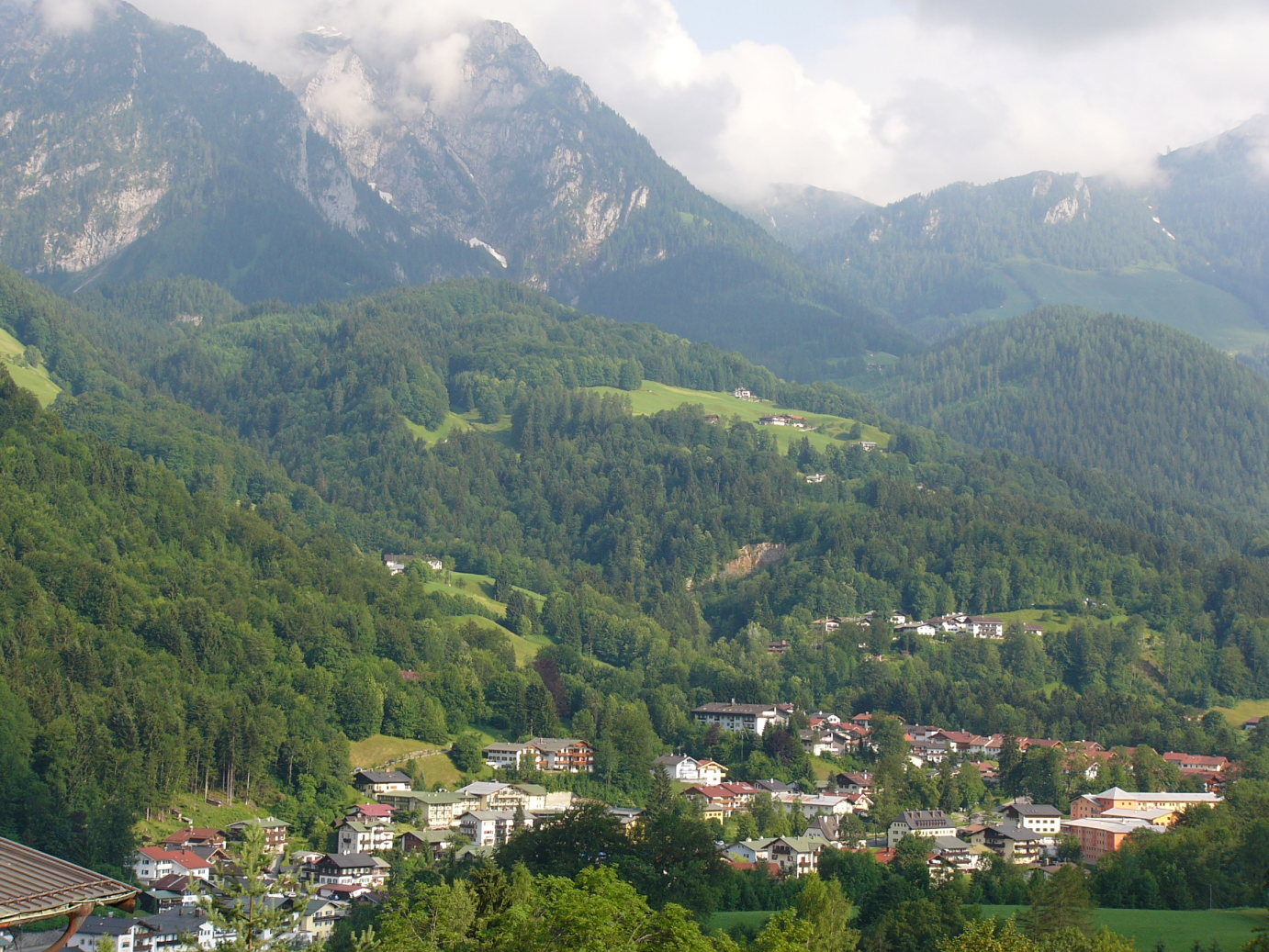
Aerial view of Berchtesgaden

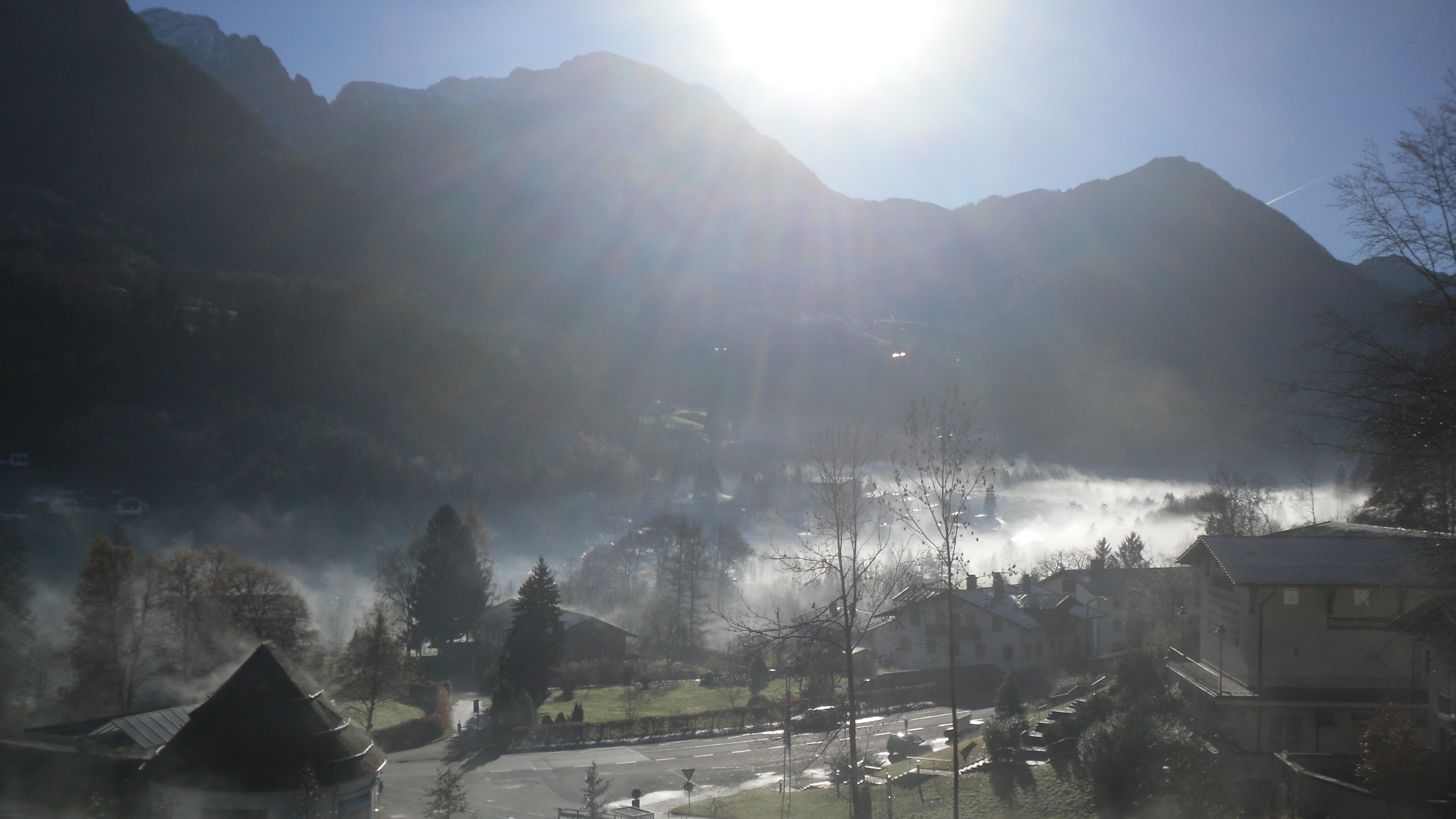
Berchtesgaden in the morning

The Hotel Türken, which was near the Nazi buildings and was often used by the SS and then by the Generalmajor of the Police, was badly damaged in 1945. It was rebuilt in 1950 and reopened as a hotel before Christmas. Visitors can still explore the historic underground hallways and tunnels that had been used by the Nazis.

In 1972, local government reform united the then-independent municipalities of Salzberg, Maria Gern, and Au (consisting of Oberau and Unterau) under the administration of the town of Berchtesgaden. Another suggested reform uniting all remaining five municipalities in the Berchtesgaden valley (Bischofswiesen, Ramsau, Marktschellenberg, and Schönau am Königssee) failed to gain enough popular support; it passed in Berchtesgaden but failed elsewhere.

The Berchtesgaden National Park was established in 1978 and has gradually become one of Berchtesgaden's largest draws. Mass tourism is confined to a few popular spots, leaving the rest to nature-seekers. Other tourist draws are the Königssee, the salt mine, the Kehlsteinhaus which was operated seasonally as a restaurant until a fire damaged the building in 2026, and the Dokumentationszentrum Obersalzberg museum about the area's history, has been operated by the Munich Institut für Zeitgeschichte since 1999.

Recreational and competitive sports have grown in importance. The town's ski slope is popular. The Königssee bobsleigh, luge, and skeleton track has hosted ski-running and several international events and competitions. Berchtesgaden's most famous sports personality is Georg Hackl, a multiple Olympic medal winner. The city is home to the International Luge Federation (FIL).

Unlike the northern part of Berchtesgadener Land and the Salzburg area, Berchtesgaden has virtually no manufacturing industry.

The Bavarian state government facilitated the erection of a hotel, which opened in 2005 and is operated by the InterContinental Hotels Group. Since May 2015, the hotel has been the Kempinski Berchtesgaden.

== Geography ==
Berchtesgaden's neighbouring towns are Bischofswiesen, Marktschellenberg, Ramsau, and Schönau am Königssee.

The municipality counts the following villages (Ortsteile): Am Etzerschlößl, Anzenbach, Hintergern, Metzenleiten, Mitterbach, Oberau, Obergern, Obersalzberg, Resten, Unterau, Untersalzberg I, Untersalzberg II, and Vordergern.

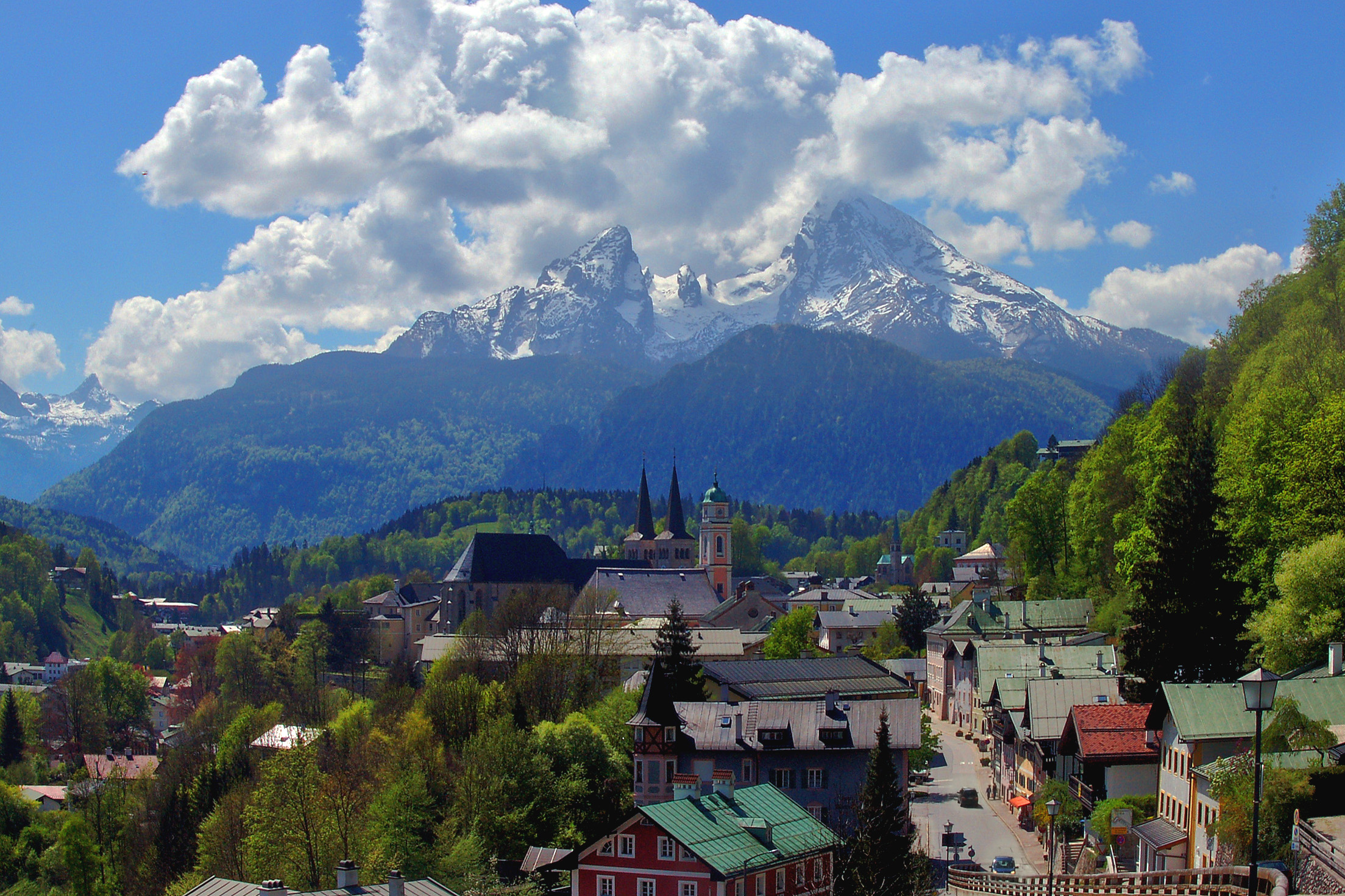
The Watzmann from Berchtesgaden

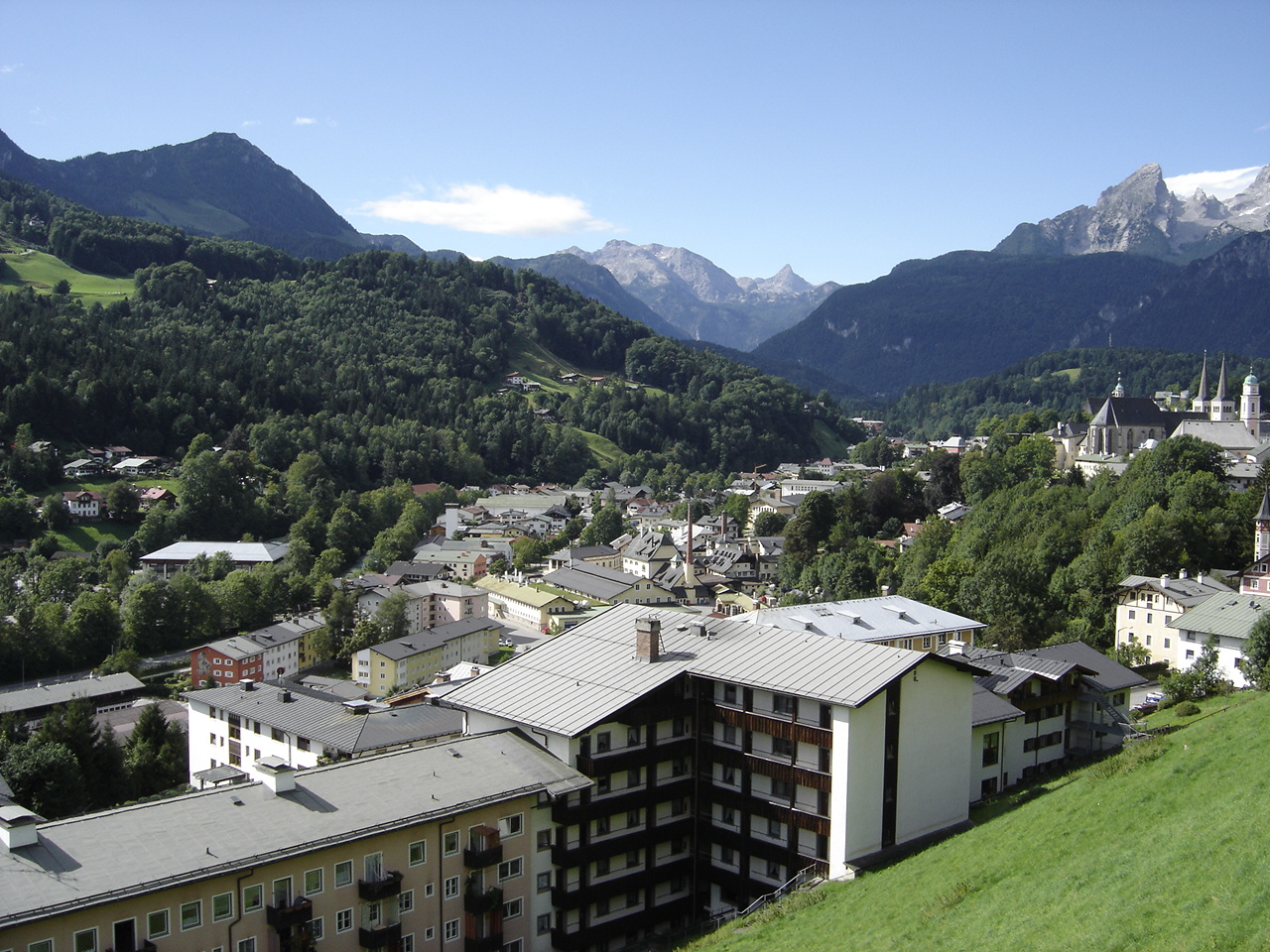
View of Berchtesgaden towards the Königssee

== Transportation ==
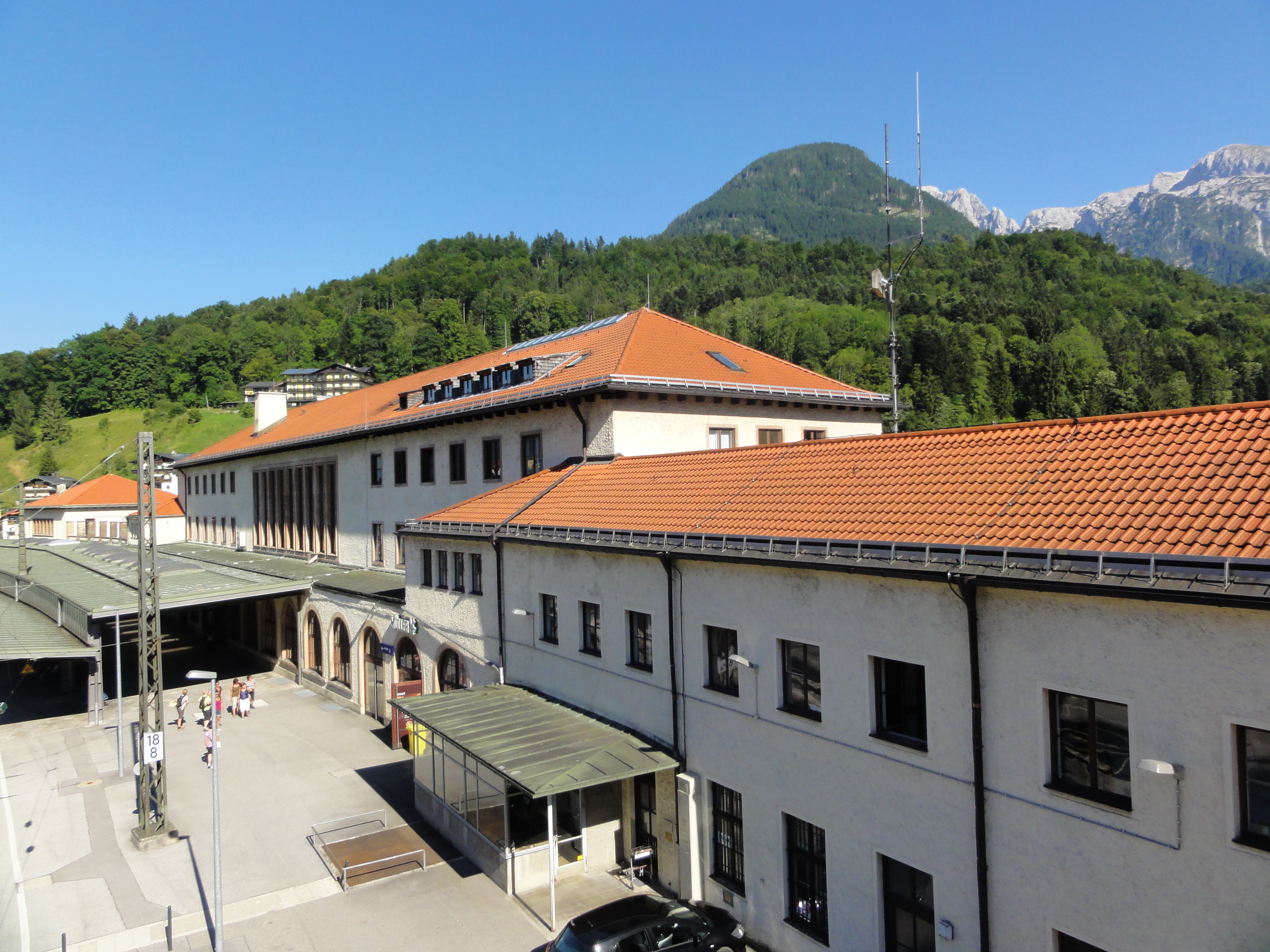
Berchtesgaden Hbf

The town has a tram stop named Berchtesgaden Hbf (Hbf means Hauptbahnhof, "main station") on line S4 of the Salzburg S-Bahn which runs from Freilassing station (where it connects with the Rosenheim–Salzburg railway) to Berchtesgaden.

The epithet Hauptbahnhof is somewhat ambitious, and in fact this is the smallest town in Germany to have a station named Hauptbahnhof.

The nearest airport to the town is Salzburg Airport, 25.5 km (16 mi) to the north of the town.

== Notable people ==
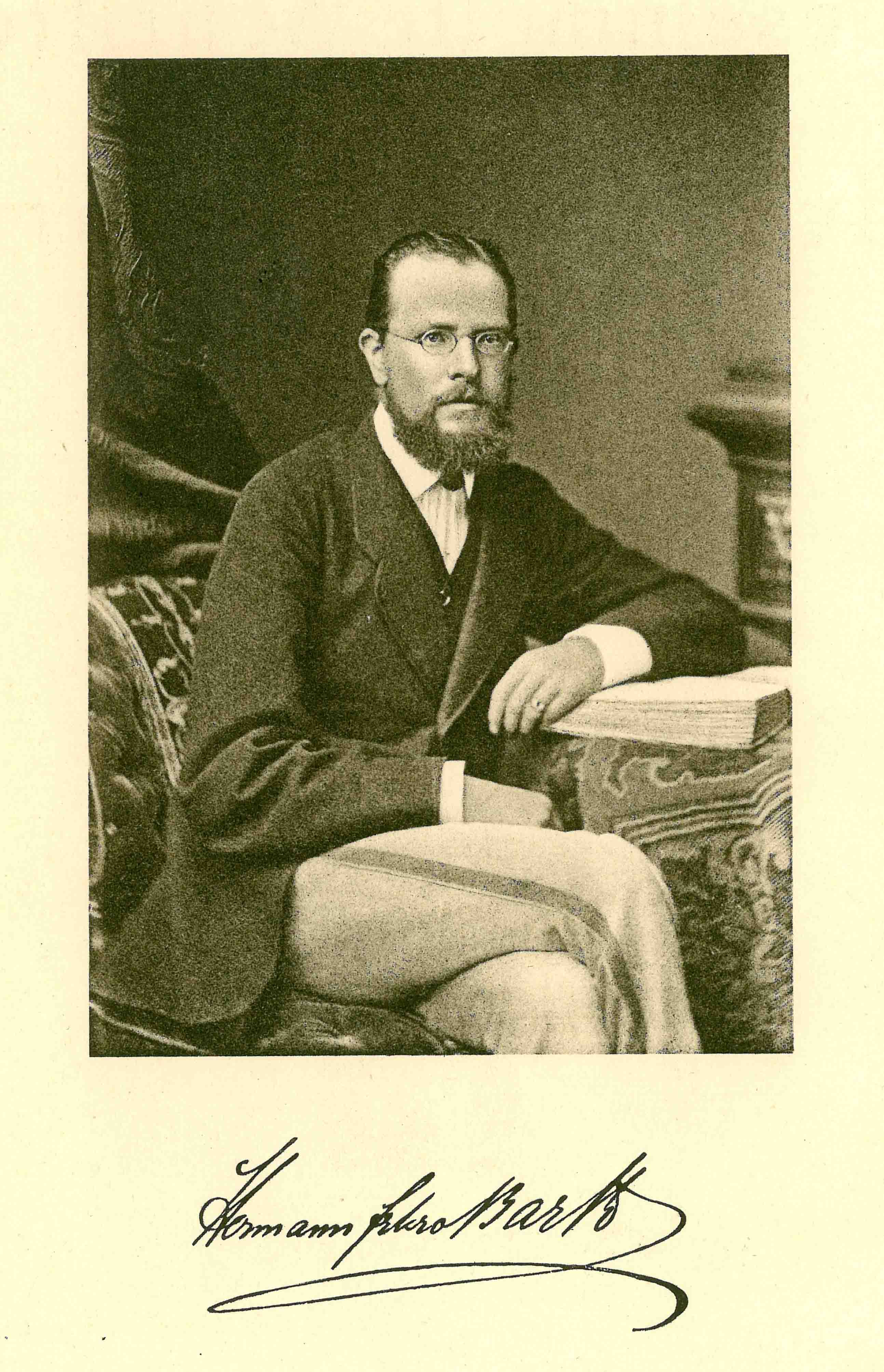
Hermann von Barth

- Wolfgang Bartels, (1940–2007), Olympic alpine skier bronze medalist
- Karl Bartos, (born 1952), electronic musician, former electronic percussionist in the band Kraftwerk
- Sigmund Freud (1856–1939), psychoanalyst, owned a house for family holidays in Schönau near Obersalzberg. His villa was taken over during the Second World War by Heinrich Himmler.
- Franz Graßl, (born 1965), ski mountaineer
- Judith Graßl, (born 1968), ski mountaineer
- Georg Hackl, (born 1966), first Winter Olympics competitor to win five consecutive medals with consecutively two silver and three gold medals in the men's single luge event
- Adolf Hitler, (1889–1945), leader of the Nazi Party and German dictator 1933–1945; owned the Eagle's Nest mountain retreat in Berchtesgaden
- Kathrin Hölzl, alpine ski racer and gold medalist in the giant slalom at the 2009 World Championships
- Princess Irmingard of Bavaria, Nazi resister and survivor of Oranienburg-Sachsenhausen, Flossenbürg and Dachau concentration camps
- Katrya Hrynevycheva, Ukrainian writer and community leader.
- Jutta Kleinschmidt, (born 1962), German offroad automotive racing competitor
- Toni Kurz, (1913–1936), German 20th century mountaineer
- Patric Leitner, five-time winner of luge World Cup and four-time World Championship titles (in men's doubles with Alexander Resch)
- Felix Loch, four-time luge gold medalist (two in singles and two in mixed team) FIL World Luge Championships
- Johannes Lochner, world and Olympic champion bobsledder
- Manuel Machata (born 1984), German former bobsledder
- Peter Öttl, Grand Prix motorcycle road racer
- Hans Plenk, Olympic bronze-medalist in the men's single luge event
- Romy Schneider, (1938–1982), German-French film actress
- Kaspar Stanggassinger, (1871-1899), Redemptorist priest, declared Blessed in 1988
- Silvia Treimer, ski mountaineer
- Hermann von Barth, (1845–1876), German 19th century mountaineer
- John Allan Wyeth (1894–1981), American war poet and Post-Impressionist painter, was a regular visitor to Berchtesgaden, where he would indulge in his passion for landscape painting, during the 1930s.

== Toy symphonies ==
In the 1760s, several anonymous toy symphonies (including the famous Toy Symphony often attributed to Haydn or Leopold Mozart) were composed at Berchtesgaden, then a manufacturing centre for toy instruments. Some of the instruments used for these can be seen in the Museum Carolino Augusteum in Salzburg.
