= Monique Merrill =

Personal information
- Born: May 26, 1969 (age 57)

Sport
- Sport: Skiing
Medal record
Representing United States

Monique Merrill (born May 26, 1969) is an American world champion adventure racer, ski mountaineer and marathon mountain biker. She studied at the University of Virginia.

Merrill attended the Pine Crest School until 1987, and studied at the University of Virginia until 1991. She lives in Crested Butte, Colorado.

== Selected results ==
- Six-time champion and record holder for Imperial Challenge Multisport, Breckenridge
- Three-time champion and record holder, Co-ed Grand Traverse-Crested Butte to Aspen ski race
- 1999:
  - 1st, Montezuma's Revenge Mountain Bike 24 Hour Race
- 2000:
  - 1st, Montezuma's Revenge Mountain Bike 24 Hour Race
- 2003:
  - 1st, Xterra National Overall, Keystone
  - 1st, Montezuma's Revenge Mountain Bike 24 Hour Race
- 2005:
  - 1st, Life-Link Ski Mountaineering Series
- 2006:
  - 1st, World Championship Adventure Racing, Sweden
  - 1st, Primal Quest Adventure Race, Utah
  - 1st, Raid Galouise, Alberta, Canada
  - 3rd, Xterra National Championships, Colorado
  - 10th, World Championship vertical race
- 2007:
  - 1st, World Championship Adventure Racing, Scotland
  - 1st, North American Randonnee Rally, Jackson Hole
  - 1st, 100 Mile Mountain Bike Marathon, Breckenridge
  - 1st, Mountain Crest Marathon 27.2 miles, Breckenridge
- 2009:
  - 1st, US Ski Mountaineering National Championship, Jackson Hole
- 2010:
  - 7th, World Championship team race (together with Amy Fulywer)
  - 9th, World Championship single race
  - 9th, World Championship vertical race
  - 9th, World Championship combination ranking
- 2011:
  - 1st, Power of Four, Aspen Mountain, mixed team, together with Mike Kloser

=== Pierra Menta ===
- 2009: 7th, together with Sari Anderson

=== Patrouille des Glaciers ===
- 2010: 7th (and 4th in the "international civilian women" ranking), together with Lyndsay Meyer and Nina Cook Silitch
