= Melanie Bernier =

Melanie Bernier may refer to:

- Mélanie Bernier (born 1985), French actress
- Melanie Bernier (ski mountaineer) (born 1981), Canadian ski mountaineer
