= Steurer =

Steurer is a surname. Notable people with the surname include:

- Florence Steurer (later Penz, born 1949), French alpine skier
- Glen Steurer (born 1955), American racing driver
- Toni Steurer (born 1978), German ski mountaineer and extreme sports athlete
