= Dennis Brunod =

Italian ski mountaineer, mountain and skyrunner

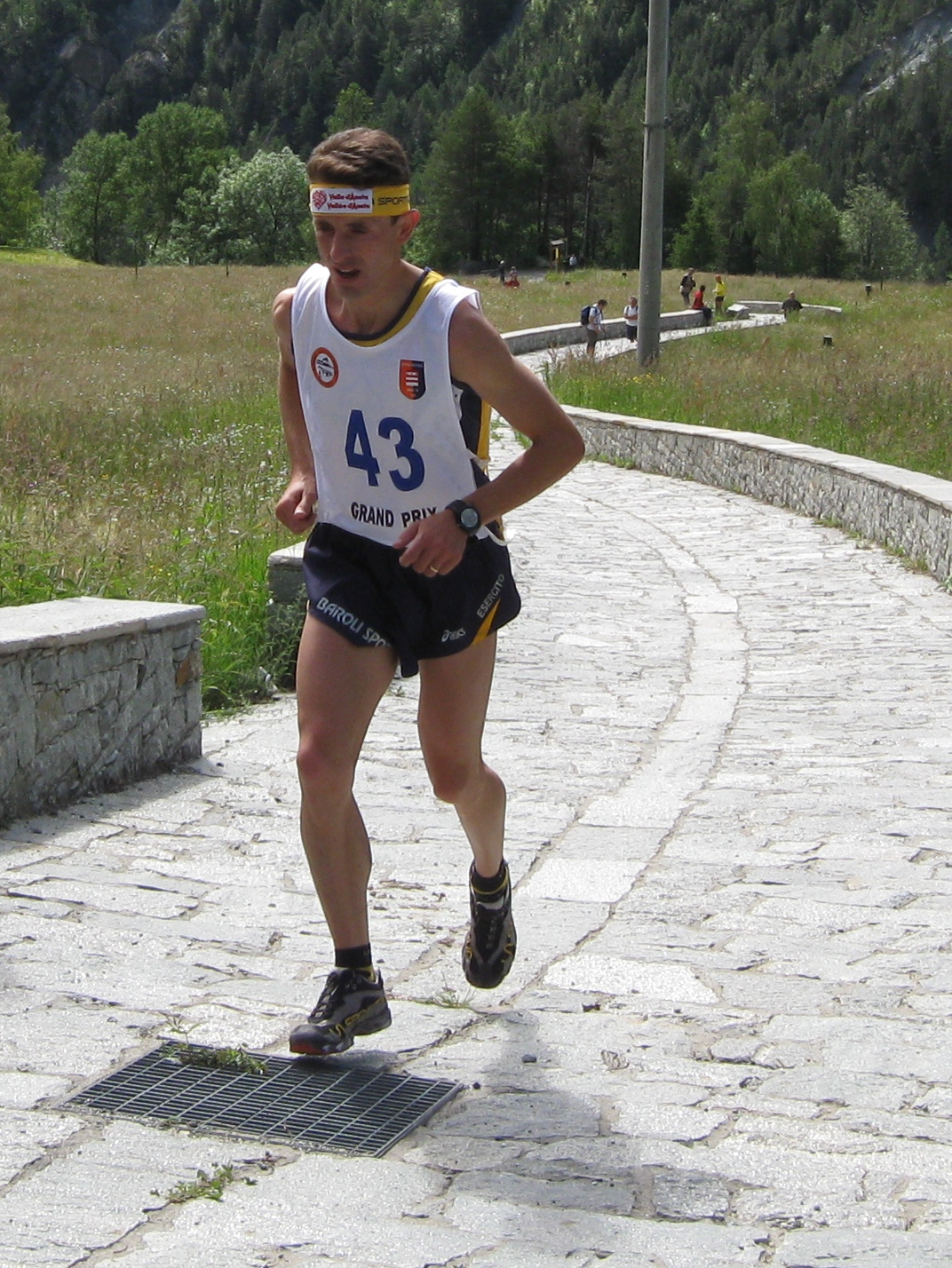
- Brunod during the race "Trofeo Mont Avic 2010"

Personal information
- Born: 16 June 1978 (age 48) Aosta, Italy

Sport
- Sport: Skiing
Medal record
Ski mountaineering
Representing Italy
World Championships
Gold medal – first place	2006 World Championship	Relay
Gold medal – first place	2008 World Championship	Relay
Gold medal – first place	2010 World Championship	Relay
Silver medal – second place	2008 World Championship	Vertical race
Silver medal – second place	2010 World Championship	Vertical race
Bronze medal – third place	2004 World Championship	Single
Bronze medal – third place	2004 World Championship	Team
Bronze medal – third place	2006 World Championship	Team
Bronze medal – third place	2008 World Championship	Single race
European Championships
Gold medal – first place	2005 European Championship	Relay
Gold medal – first place	2007 European Championship	Relay
Gold medal – first place	2009 European Championship	Relay
Silver medal – second place	2003 European Championship	Team
Silver medal – second place	2007 European Championship	Single
Bronze medal – third place	2009 European Championship	Team
Skyrunning
European Championships
Bronze medal – third place	2007 Poschiavo	SkyRace

Dennis Brunod (born 16 June 1978 in Aosta) is an Italian ski mountaineer, mountain and skyrunner.

== Life ==
Born in Aosta but living in Châtillon, Brunod added ski mountaineering to his favorite sports in 2000, when he first competed in the Mountain Attack race in Saalbach. He was member of the Italian national team after 2002.

== Selected results ==
=== Ski mountaineering ===
- 2002:
  - 1st, Italian Cup team (together with Manfred Reichegger)
  - 1st, Tour du Rutor (together with Manfred Reichegger)
  - 2nd, Transcavallo (together with Manfred Reichegger)
- 2003:
  - 1st, Italian Cup team (together with Manfred Reichegger)
  - 2nd, European Championship team race (together with Manfred Reichegger)
  - 4th, European Championship combination ranking
  - 6th, European Championship single race
- 2004:
  - 1st, Dolomiti Cup team (together with Manfred Reichegger)
  - 2nd, Transcavallo (together with Manfred Reichegger)
  - 3rd, World Championship single race
  - 3rd, World Championship team race (together with Manfred Reichegger)
  - 3rd, World Championship combination ranking
- 2005:
  - 1st, European Championship relay race (together with Guido Giacomelli, Manfred Reichegger and Matteo Pedergnana)
  - 1st, Italian Cup team (together with Manfred Reichegger)
  - 5th, World Cup team (together with Manfred Reichegger)
  - 6th, European Championship vertical race
- 2006:
  - 1st, World Championship relay race (together with Hansjörg Lunger, Manfred Reichegger, and Guido Giacomelli)
  - 1st, World Cup team (together with Manfred Reichegger)
  - 1st, Tour du Rutor (together with Manfred Reichegger)
  - 3rd, World Championship team race (together with Manfred Reichegger)
- 2007:
  - 1st, World Cup single
  - 1st, World Cup team (together with Federico Pedranzini)
  - 1st, European Championship relay race (together with Denis Trento, Manfred Reichegger and Guido Giacomelli)
  - 1st, Traça Catalana race
  - 1st, Tour du Rutor (together with Manfred Reichegger)
  - 2nd, European Championship single race
  - 3rd, European Championship combination ranking
  - 4th, European Championship team race (together with Manfred Reichegger)
- 2008:
  - 1st, World Championship relay race (together with Manfred Reichegger, Denis Trento and Martin Riz)
  - 1st, World Cup, Val d'Aran
  - 2nd, World Championship vertical race
  - 2nd, World Championship combination ranking
  - 3rd, World Championship single race
- 2009:
  - 1st, European Championship relay race (together with Lorenzo Holzknecht, Manfred Reichegger and Damiano Lenzi)
  - 3rd, European Championship team race (together with Manfred Reichegger)
- 2010
  - 1st, World Championship relay race (together with Damiano Lenzi, Lorenzo Holzknecht and Manfred Reichegger)
  - 2nd, World Championship vertical race
  - 6th, World Championship team race (together with Manfred Reichegger)
  - 8th, World Championship combination ranking
  - 2nd, Trophée des Gastlosen (ISMF World Cup), together with Manfred Reichegger

==== Trofeo Mezzalama ====
- 2001: 5th, together with Nicola Invernizzi and Emanuel Conta
- 2003: 3rd, together with Manfred Reichegger and Nicola Invernizzi
- 2005: 3rd, together with Manfred Reichegger and Jean Pellissier
- 2007: 3rd, together with Manfred Reichegger and Denis Trento

==== Pierra Menta ====
- 2004: 1st, together with Manfred Reichegger
- 2009: 1st, together with Manfred Reichegger
- 2010: 3rd, together with Manfred Reichegger

=== Mountain running / skyrunning ===
Brunod won the Mezzalama Skyrace in 2004, and from 2006 to 2008.

- 2001: 3rd, Sentiero 4 Luglio SkyMarathon
- 2002: 1st, Sentiero 4 Luglio SkyMarathon
- 2004: 1st, Valposchiavo-Valmalenco-Skyrunning (Skyrunner World Series race)
- 2005: 1st, Sentiero delle Grigne-Skyrunning (SkyRunner World Series race)
