= Stefan Klinger =

German ski mountaineer (born 1978)

Personal information
- Born: 24 April 1978 (age 48) Anger, Germany

Sport
- Sport: Skiing
Medal record
Representing Germany
Ski mountaineering
| Bronze medal – third place | 2005 European Championship | Relay |

Stefan Klinger (born 24 April 1978) is a German ski mountaineer.

Klinger was born in Anger. He inspired his girl friend Stefanie Koch to compete also in the national ski mountaineering team.

== Selected results ==
- 2003:
  - 1st, Predigtstuhl race
- 2004:
  - 6th, Mountain Attack
  - 11th, World Championship relay race (together with Tim Stachel, Gerhard Reithmeier and Toni Steurer)
- 2005:
  - 4th, German Championship single
  - 3rd, European Championship relay race (together with Toni Steurer, Franz Graßl and Georg Nickaes)
  - 5th, Mountain Attack
- 2007:
  - 3rd, German Championship single
  - 3rd, German Championship vertical race
  - 4th, European Championship relay race (together with Toni Steurer, Konrad Lex and Martin Echtler)
- 2008:
  - 1st, German Championship team
  - 6th, World Championship relay race (together with Toni Steurer, Andreas Strobel and Konrad Lex)
  - 8th (and 6th in the "international men" ranking), Patrouille des Glaciers (together with Toni Steurer and Franz Graßl)
