= 2012 North American Ski Mountaineering Championship =

The 2012 North American Ski Mountaineering Championship was the first edition of a North American Championship of Ski Mountaineering.

The 2012 Crested Butte Ski Mountaineering Race, supported by the United States Ski Mountaineering Association (USSMA), held in Colorado from 27 to 29 January 2012 was billed as the North American Championship of the International Ski Mountaineering Federation (ISMF). Participants were competition ski mountaineers from Canada and the United States. Some competitors from other continents (italic in the ranking lists below) also participated in the Crested Butte Ski Mountaineering Race events, but appear only in the World ranking and not in the North American Championship's ranking (abbreviated NAC in the lists below).

== Results ==
=== Sprint race ===
Event held on January 28, 2012

List of the best 10 participants by gender:

==== Women ====
NAC	participant	total time	World
	(Canada) Melanie Bernier	05' 39"	
	(United States) Janelle Smiley	05' 57"	
	(United States) Sari Anderson	06' 28"	
––––––	(Spain) Gemma Arró Ribot	06' 41"	4
4	(United States) Lyndsay Meyer	07' 11"	5
5	(Canada) Julie Matteau	07' 14"	6
6	(United States) Stevie Kremer	07' 49"^{1)}	7
7	(United States) Jari Kirkland	08' 42"	8
8	(United States) Jen Gersbach	08' 53"^{1)}	9
9	(United States) Sarah Stubbe	09' 23"	10
10	(United States) Lindsay Plant	08' 42"	11

^{1)} includes 5 penalty seconds

==== Men ====
NAC	participant	total time	World
––––––	(Italy) Manfred Reichegger	04' 48"	
	(Canada) Reiner Thoni	05' 09"	
––––––	(Italy) Lorenzo Holzknecht	05' 10"	
	(Canada) Andrew McNab	05' 19"	4
––––––	(Slovakia) Jan Koles	05' 24"	5
	(United States) Travis Scheefer	05' 27"	6
4	(United States) Andrew "Andy" Dorais	05' 36"	7
5	(United States) Marshall Thomson	05' 39"	8
6	(United States) Jared Inouye	05' 44"	9
7	(United States) Jon Brown	05' 53"	10
8	(United States) Brian Smith	05' 54"	11
9	(United States) Simon Gilna	05' 57"	12
10	(United States) Mike Schilling	05' 58"	13

=== Single race ===
Event held on January 29, 2012

List of the best 10 participants by gender:

==== Women ====
NAC	participant	total time	World
	(United States) Janelle Smiley	02h 39' 42"	
	(United States) Sari Anderson	02h 44' 03"	
	(United States) Stevie Kremer	03h 00' 24"^{1)}	
––––––	(Spain) Gemma Arró Ribot	03h 12' 24"	4
4	(Canada) Melanie Bernier	03h 13' 51"	5
5	(United States) Jari Kirkland	03h 15' 52"	6
6	(Canada) Julie Matteau	03h 36' 20"	7
7	(United States) Lindsay Plant	03h 46' 43"	8
8	(United States) Lyndsay Meyer	03h 50' 17"	9
9	(United States) Jen Gersbach	03h 52' 23"	10
10	(United States) Andrea Koenig	04h 20 58"	11

^{1)} includes 1 penalty minute

==== Men ====
NAC	participant	total time	World
––––––	(Italy) Manfred Reichegger	01h 58' 35"	
––––––	(Italy) Lorenzo Holzknecht	02h 02' 06"	
	(Canada) Reiner Thoni	02h 07' 38"	
	(United States) Luke Nelson	02h 13' 32"	4
	(United States) Jason Dorais	02h 18' 20"	5
4	(United States) Marshall Thomson	02h 21' 04"	6
5	(United States) Jared Inouye	02h 23' 53"	7
6	(Canada) Andrew McNab	02h 26' 55"	8
7	(United States) Travis Scheefer	02h 29' 45"	9
8	(United States) Andrew "Andy" Dorais	02h 28' 54"^{1)}	10
9	(United States) Jon Brown	02h 30' 47"	11
10	(United States) Brian Smith	02h 35' 05"	13^{2)}

^{1)} includes 1 penalty minute
^{2)} 12th in World ranking was the Slovak runner Jan Koles.

=== Total Ranking ===
(total time of the sprint and the single races)

List of the best 10 teams by gender:

==== Women ====
NAC	team	sprint	single	total time	World
	(United States) Janelle Smiley	05' 57"	02h 39' 42"	02h 45' 39"	
	(United States) Sari Anderson	06' 28"	02h 44' 03"	02h 50' 31"	
	(United States) Stevie Kremer	07' 49"^{1)}	03h 00' 24"^{2)}	03h 09' 14"	
––––––	(Spain) Gemma Arró Ribot	06' 41"	03h 12' 24"	03h 19' 05"	4
4	(Canada) Melanie Bernier	05' 39"	03h 13' 51"	03h 19' 30"	5
5	(United States) Jari Kirkland	08' 42"	03h 15' 52"	03h 24' 35"	6
6	(Canada) Julie Matteau	07' 14"	03h 36' 20"	03h 43' 34"	7
7	(United States) Lindsay Plant	09' 51"	03h 46' 43"	03h 56' 34"	8
8	(United States) Lyndsay Meyer	07' 11"	03h 50' 17"	03h 57' 27"	9
9	(United States) Jen Gersbach	08' 48"^{1)}	03h 52' 23"	04h 01' 16"	10
10	(United States) Andrea Koenig	10' 28"	04h 20 58"	04h 31' 27"	11

^{1)} includes 5 penalty seconds
^{2)} includes 1 penalty minute

==== Men ====
NAC	team	sprint	single	total time	World
––––––	(Italy) Manfred Reichegger	04' 48"	01h 58' 35"	02h 03' 22"	
––––––	(Italy) Lorenzo Holzknecht	05' 10"	02h 02' 06"	02h 07' 16"	
	(Canada) Reiner Thoni	05' 09"	02h 07' 38"	02h 12' 47"	
	(United States) Luke Nelson	06' 39"	02h 13' 32"	02h 20' 11"	4
	(United States) Jason Dorais	06' 38"	02h 18' 20"	02h 24' 58"	5
4	(United States) Marshall Thomson	05' 39"	02h 21' 04"	02h 26' 43"	6
5	(United States) Jared Inouye	05' 44"	02h 23' 53"	02h 29' 37"	7
6	(Canada) Andrew McNab	05' 19"	02h 26' 55"	02h 32' 14"	8
7	(United States) Travis Scheefer	05' 27"	02h 29' 45"	02h 35' 12"	9
8	(United States) Andrew "Andy" Dorais	05' 36"	02h 28' 54"^{1)}	02h 35' 30"	10
9	(United States) Jon Brown	05' 53"	02h 30' 47"	02h 36' 40"	11
10	(United States) Brian Smith	05' 54"	02h 35' 05"	02h 40' 59"	13^{2)}

^{1)} includes 1 penalty minute
^{2)} 12th in World total ranking was the Slovak

runner Jan Koles.
