= Cary Smith (ski mountaineer) =

American ski mountaineer

Personal information
- Born: September 22, 1968 (age 57)

Sport
- Sport: Skiing
Medal record
Representing United States

Cary Smith (born September 22, 1968) from Jackson, Wyoming, is an American ski mountaineer and member of the United States Ski Mountaineering Association (USSMA) ski team. Together with Pete Swenson, Chris Kroger and Steve Romeo he finished ninth in the relay event of the 2006 World Championship of Ski Mountaineering.
