= 2006 World Championship of Ski Mountaineering =

The 2006 World Championship of Ski Mountaineering (Italian: Campionato del Mondo di Scialpinismo 2006) was the third World Championship of Ski Mountaineering sanctioned by the International Council for Ski Mountaineering Competitions (ISMC), held in the Italian Province of Cuneo from February 27 to March 4, 2006.

The participating athletes were from 33 nations. Because the relay event for the "Senior" athletes had to be canceled to bad snow conditions, there was consequently no combined ranking.

== Results ==
=== Nation ranking and medals ===
(all age groups)

ranking	country	vertical Race				team				relay				individual (Juniors)				
ranking	country	points				points				points				points				total points
1	Italy	1320	1	3	2	458	1		1	400	2			164			1	2342
2	Switzerland	1412	1	3	2	354			1	344		1	1	180		1		2290
3	France	1210	5	2	3	420	1	2		344		1	1	200	1			2174
4	Spain	1028	1			162				284				144				1618
5	Germany	443				290				296								1029
6	Slovakia	644			1	100				152				152				922
7	Greece	447				11				100				136				694
8	Czech Republic	286				160				124								680
9	Andorra	383				160				132								675
10	United States	331				130				128								589
11	Slovenia	416				24				136								576
12	Poland	214				26				120				140				500
13	Norway	214				81				108								403
14	Romania	343																343
15	Russia	152				8				96								256
16	Sweden	85				22				116								223
17	Bulgaria	192				22												214
18	Chile	105				2				92								199
19	United Kingdom	53				32				112								197
20	Japan	50				24				104								178
21	Liechtenstein	72																72
22	Venezuela	62																62
22	Denmark	62																62
24	Finland	51																51
25	Croatia	49																49
26	Canada	44																44
27	Argentina	42																42
28	Belgium	13				1												14
29	Morocco	9																9
30	South Korea	2																2
31	Austria																	
31	China																	
31	Turkey																	

=== Vertical race ===
Event held at Crissolo on February 28, 2008

- altitude of the starting point: 1,365m
- distance: 4.7 km lange Strecke
- altitude difference (ascent): 1000m

List of the best 10 participants by gender:

==== Women ====
ranking	participant	total time
	Natascia Leonardi Cortesi	00h 50' 11.5"
	Roberta Pedranzini	00h 51' 55"
	Catherine Mabillard	00h 52' 27.2"
4	Gloriana Pellissier	00h 52' 54.8"
5	Corinne Favre	00h 53' 13.3"
6	Chiara Raso	00h 53' '41.4 "
7	Nathalie Etzensperger	00h 54' 00.7"
8	Barbara Gruber	00h 55' 19.8"
9	Laëtitia Roux	00h 55' 54.2"
10	Monique Merrill	00h 55' 58.1"

==== Men ====
ranking	participant	total time
	Patrick Blanc	00h 39' 11.3"
	Tony Sbalbi	00h 41' 13.9"
	Florent Perrier	00h 41' 14.1"
4	Agustí Roc Amador	00h 42' 21.8"
5	Sébastien Epiney	00h 43' 39.7"
6	Alain Rey	00h 43' 40.4"
7	Manuel Pérez Brunicardi	00h 44' 03.2"
8	Denis Trento	00h 44' 19.1"
9	Olivier Nägele	00h 44' 20.9"
10	Mirco Mezzanotte	00h 44' 22.7"

=== Team ===
Event held at Crissolo on March 1, 2006

- altitude of the starting point: 1,725m
- highest altitude: 3,019m
- distance (long distance): 20.3 km
- altitude difference:
  - ascent: 2,088m
  - downhill: 2,088m

List of the best 10 teams by gender:

==== Women ====
ranking	team	total time
	Pedranzini/Martinelli	02h 21' 10.3"
	Favre/Toïgo	02h 26' 07.2"
	Mabillard/Pont-Combe	02h 26' 23.2"
4	J. Graßl/Koch	02h 28' 45.1"
5	Bourillon/Lathuraz	02h 31' 11.1"
6	Magnenat/Zimmermann	02h 31' 37.4"
7	Renzler/Calliari	02h 35' 05.3"
8	Raso/Martinale	02h 36' 54.6"
9	C. Bes Ginesta/Zubizarreta Guerendiain	02h 42' 10.4"
10	Echtler-Schleich/Treimer	02h 45' 10.6"

==== Men ====
ranking	team	total time
	Brosse/P. Blanc	01h 48' 41.5"
	Perrier/Gachet	01h 50' 21.1"
	Brunod/Reichegger	01h 51' 15.1"
4	Hug/Elmer	01h 54' 05.8"
5	Giacomelli/Lunger	01h 55' 31.6"
6	J. Pellissier/Battel	01h 57' 32.5"
7	D. Blanc/Premat	01h 57' 44."
8	Pellicier/Gignoux	01h 58' 17.3"
9	Ecoeur/A. Rey	01h 58' 33.2"
10	Moret/Taramarcaz	01h 59' 36.4"

=== Individual (canceled) ===
Route:

- distance: 17.1 km
- highest altitude: 2,400m
- altitude difference:
  - ascent: 1,740m
  - downhill: 1,750m

=== Relay ===
Event held in Artesina on March 4, 2006

- distance: 1.92 km
- altitude of starting point: 1,363m
- highest altitude: 1,503m
- altitude difference:
  - ascent: 140m
  - downhill: 140m

List of the best 10 relay teams by gender:

==== Women ====
ranking	team	total time
	Francesca Martinelli/Chiara Raso/Roberta Pedranzini/Gloriana Pellissier	01h 13' 21"
	Gabrielle Magnenat/Nathalie Etzensperger/Catherine Mabillard/Séverine Pont-Combe	01h 14' 23"
	Carole Toïgo/Véronique Lathuraz/Corinne Favre/Nathalie Bourillon	01h 14' 26"
4	Judith Graßl/Barbara Gruber/Silvia Treimer/Stefanie Koch	01h 18' 32.2"
5	Gemma Arró Ribot/Naila Jornet Burgada/Izaskun Zubizarreta/Cristina Bes Ginesta	01h 27' 25"

==== Men ====
ranking	team	total time
	Dennis Brunod/Hansjörg Lunger/Manfred Reichegger/Guido Giacomelli	00h 57' 47.2"
	Grégory Gachet/Stéphane Brosse/Florent Perrier/Patrick Blanc	00h 59' 57.1"
	Alexander Hug/Alain Rey/Rico Elmer/Florent Troillet	00h 59' 58.4"
4	Peter Svätojánsky/Miroslav Leitner/Milan Blaško/Milan Madaj	01h 02' 50"
5	Toni Steurer/Franz Graßl/Martin Echtler/Georg Nickaes	01h 03' 12.4"
6	Javier Martín de Villa/Federico Galera Díez/Manuel Pérez Brunicardi/Agustí Roc Amador	01h 03' 31"
7	Anže Šenk/Jernej Karničar/Tomaž Soklič/Nejc Kuhar	01h 06' 44"
8	Toni Casals Rueda/Xavier Capdevila Romero/Joan Albós Cavaliere/Joan Vilana Díaz	01h 07' 15.4"
9	Pete Swenson/Cary Smith/Chris Kroger/Steve Romeo	01h 07' 48.3"
10	Jaroslav Bánský/Marcel Svoboda/Michal Němec/Miroslav Duch	01h 10' 14.7"
