= 2005 European Championship of Ski Mountaineering =

The 2005 European Championship of Ski Mountaineering (Catalan: Campionat d’Europa d’Esquí de Muntanya 2005) was the sixth European Championship of ski mountaineering and was held in Andorra from March 1, 2005 to March 5, 2005. The competition was organized by the International Council for Ski Mountaineering Competitions (ISMC) of the Union Internationale des Associations d'Alpinisme (UIAA).

== Results ==
=== Nation ranking and medals ===
Compared to the 2003 European Championship a vertical race and a relay race event were held but were not added to the total ranking of the Federació Andorrana de Muntanyisme (FAM).

(all age groups)

ranking	country	team				individual					vertical race			relay		
ranking	country	points				points				total points						
1	Switzerland	478	1	1	1	1230	2	3	4	1708	3	3	4	2	1	1
2	Italy	300		1		1170	4	1		1470	2	3	2	1	1	
3	France	312	1			1062		1		1374		1	1		1	
4	Spain	190				708		1		898	2					
5	Germany	314			1	336				650			1			2
6	Slovakia	66				574		1	1	640	1	1				
7	Czech Republic	202				394				596						
8	Slovenia	46				318				364						
9	Greece	64				257				321						
10	Andorra	96				141				237						
11	Poland	82				106				188						
12	Romania					174				174						
13	Russia	38				112				150						
14	Austria					140				140						
15	Bulgaria					31				31						

=== Vertical race ===
Event held in Canillo on March 1, 2005

List of the best 10 participants by gender:

==== Women ====
ranking	participant	total time
	(Switzerland) Cristina Favre-Moretti	00h 53' 35.44"
	(Italy) Gloriana Pellissier	00h 53' 48.92"
	(Germany) Barbara Gruber	00h 54' 04.33"
4	(Switzerland) Isabella Crettenand-Moretti	00h 54' 25.31"
5	(Switzerland) Catherine Mabillard	00h 56' 17.45"
6	(Italy) Francesca Martinelli	00h 56' 40.37"
7	(France) Nathalie Bourillon	00h 57' 16.22"
8	(Switzerland) Séverine Pont-Combe	00h 57' 17.22"
9	(Switzerland) Marie Troillet	00h 58' 35.65"
10	(Germany) Christine Echtler-Schleich	00h 59' 42.7"

==== Men ====
ranking	participant	total time
	(Spain) Agustí Roc Amador	00h 42' 45.08"
	(France) Florent Perrier	00h 43' 00.31"
	(Italy) Mirco Mezzanotte	00h 44' 28.4"
4	(Switzerland) Alexander Hug	00h 44' 58.84"
5	(Switzerland) Emmanuel Vaudan	00h 45' 10.77"
6	(Italy) Dennis Brunod	00h 45' 21.78"
7	(Spain) Manuel Pérez Brunicardi	00h 46' 48.98"
8	(France) Tony Sbalbi	00h 46' 19.13"
9	(Switzerland) Alain Rey	00h ' 29.94"
10	(Austria) Alexander Lugger	00h 46' 33.84"

=== Team ===
Event held in the Gran Valira on March 2, 2005

List of the best 10 teams by gender:

==== Women ====
ranking	team	total time
	(Switzerland) Crettenand-Moretti/Favre-Moretti	02h 41' 04"
	(Switzerland) Mabillard/Magnenat	02h 47' 45"
	(Germany) J. Graßl/Gruber	02h 50' 52"
4	(Switzerland) Pont-Combe/Zimmermann	02h 54' 03"
5	(Spain) C. Bes Ginesta/Roca Rodríguez	02h 59' 27"
6	(Italy) Nex/Pellissier	02h 57(+3)' 00"
7	(Italy) Martinelli/Renzler	03h 03' 03"
8	(France) Bourillon/Lathuraz	03h 11' 33"
9	(Germany) Echtler-Schleich/Treimer	03h 16' 44"
10	(Czech Republic) Korbová/Oršulová	03h 24' 38"

==== Men ====
ranking	team	total time
	(France) Gachet/Perrier	02h 12' 36"
	(Italy) Boscacci/Murada	02h 15' 41"
	(Switzerland) Moret/Pittex	02h 16' 47"
4	(France) B. Blanc/Meilleur	02h 17' 11"
5	(Italy) Battel/J. Pellissier	02h 18' 38"
6	(France) C. Champange/Pellicier	02h 19' 07"
7	(Switzerland) Masserey/J.-Y. Rey	02h 20' 45"
8	(Slovakia) Leitner/Svätojánsky	02h 22' 57"
9	(Germany) F. Graßl/Steurer	02h 23' 24"
10	(Switzerland) Ecoeur/Vaudan	02h 26' 50"

=== Individual ===
Event held on March 3, 2005

List of the best 10 participants by gender:

==== Women ====
ranking	participant	total time
	(Switzerland) Cristina Favre-Moretti	02h 16' 38"
	(Italy) Gloriana Pellissier	02h 18' 11"
	(Switzerland) Isabella Crettenand-Moretti	02h 22' 36"
4	(Switzerland) Gabrielle Magnenat	02h 24' 30"
5	(Switzerland) Séverine Pont-Combe	02h 29' 01"
6	(Italy) Francesca Martinelli	02h 31' 02"
7	(Italy) Roberta Pedranzini	02h 31' 28"
8	(Switzerland) Marie Troillet	02h 34' 10"
9	(Germany) Judith Graßl	02h 36' 57"
10	(Spain) Emma Roca Rodríguez	02h 37' 08"

==== Men ====
ranking	participant	total time
	(Italy) Guido Giacomelli	01h 51' 43"
	(France) Florent Perrier	01h 52' 52"
	(Switzerland) Alexander Hug	01h 55' 37"
4	(France) Grégory Gachet	01h 56' 04"
5	(Austria) Alexander Lugger	01h 57' 36"
6	(Germany) Toni Steurer	01h 59' 43"
7	(Switzerland) Jean-Yves Rey	02h 00' 32"
8	(France) Bertrand Blanc	02h 00' 56"
9	(Spain) Manuel Pérez Brunicardi	02h 1' 06"
10	(France) William Bon Mardion	02h 01' 53"

=== Combination ranking ===
combination ranking including the results of the individual and team races

List of the best 10 participants by gender

==== Women ====
ranking	participant
4	
5	
6	
7	
8	
9	
10	

==== Men ====
ranking	participant
4	
5	
6	
7	
8	
9	
10	

=== Relay race ===
Event held near Soldau-El Tarter on March 5, 2005

List of the best 10 teams by gender:

==== Women ====
ranking	team	total time
	(Switzerland) Cristina Favre-Moretti/Isabella Crettenand-Moretti/Gabrielle Magnenat	00h 43' 48.7"
	(Italy) Gloriana Pellissier/Francesca Martinelli/Christiane Nex	00h 45' 58.7"
	(Germany) Judith Graßl/Barbara Gruber/Silvia Treimer	00h 47' 24.5"
4	(France) Nathalie Bourillon/Véronique Lathuraz/Valentine Fabre	00h 47' 44.9"
5	(Spain) Cristina Bes Ginesta/Emma Roca Rodríguez/Sara Gros Aspiroz	00h 52' 02.8"

==== Men ====
ranking	team	total time
	(Italy) Guido Giacomelli/Dennis Brunod/Manfred Reichegger/Matteo Pedergnana	00h 47' 39.61"
	(Switzerland) Alexander Hug/Christian Pittex/Jean-Yves Rey/Yannick Ecoeur	00h 49' 35.16"
	(Germany) Franz Graßl/Toni Steurer/Stefan Klinger/Georg Nickaes	00h 51' 33.19"
4	(France) Florent Perrier/Bertrand Blanc/Grégory Gachet/Tony Sbalbi	00h 51' 58.42"
5	(Slovakia) Peter Svätojánsky/Milan Madaj/Miroslav Leitner/Branislav Kačina	00h 53' 22.53"
6	(Spain) Manuel Pérez Brunicardi/Javier Martín de Villa/Germán Cerezo Alonso/Fernando Navarro Aznar	00h 53' 34.41"
7	(Andorra) Toni Casals Rueda/Xavier Comas Guixé/Xavier Capdevila Romero/Joan Vilana Díaz	00h 55' 34.09"
8	(Romania) Ionuţ Găliţeanu/Silviu Manea/Rareş Manea/Lucian Clinciu	00h 57' 44.57"
9	(Czech Republic) Michal Štantejský/Miroslav Duch/Michal Němec/Marcel Svoboda	00h 58' 49.42"
10	(Poland) Adam Gomola/Andrzej Chrobák/Mariusz Wargocki/Marcin Trybała	01h 01' 02.82"
