= Stefanie Koch =

German ski mountaineer (born 1981)

Personal information
- Born: 13 October 1981 (age 44) Anger, Germany

Sport
- Sport: Skiing
Medal record
Representing Germany

Stefanie "Steffi" Koch (born 13 October 1981) is a German ski mountaineer.

Koch was born in Anger and grew on the farm of their parents with her three siblings. In her teens she started mountain biking and participated in triathlon competitions. She passed the clerical administrative assistant training and was inspired of ski mountaineering by her boyfriend Stefan Klinger. Her aunt Resi was the first female German, who climbed on the Nanga Parbat in 2001.

== Selected results ==
- 2004:
  - 2nd, Mountain Attack team
- 2005:
  - 5th, German Championship single
  - 2nd, Mountain Attack race
- 2006:
  - 3rd, German Championship single
  - 2nd, "International Open", Saalbach
  - 4th, World Championship relay race (together with Judith Graßl, Barbara Gruber and Silvia Treimer)
  - 4.th, |World Championship team race (together with Judith Graßl)
- 2007:
  - 1st, German Championship single
  - 2nd, Mountain Attack Trace
  - 2nd, Sellaronda Skimarathon (together with Judith Graßl)
  - 3rd, Trofeo Mezzalama (together with Judith Graßl and Silvia Treimer)
  - 4th, European Championship relay race (together with Judith Graßl and Silvia Treimer)
  - 4th, European Championship team race (together with Judith Graßl)
  - 10th, European Championship combination ranking
- 2008:
  - 1st, German Championship team
  - 2nd, German Championship single
  - 2nd, German Championship vertical race
  - 2nd, Rofan Xtreme
  - 6th, World Championship team race (together with Judith Graßl)
  - 7th, Pierra Menta (together with Judith Graßl)
  - 9th, World Championship single race

=== Patrouille des Glaciers ===
- 2006: 3rd, together with Judith Graßl and Silvia Treimer
- 2008: 4th, together with Judith Graßl and Silvia Treimer
