= Nejc Kuhar =

Slovenian ski mountaineer (born 1985)

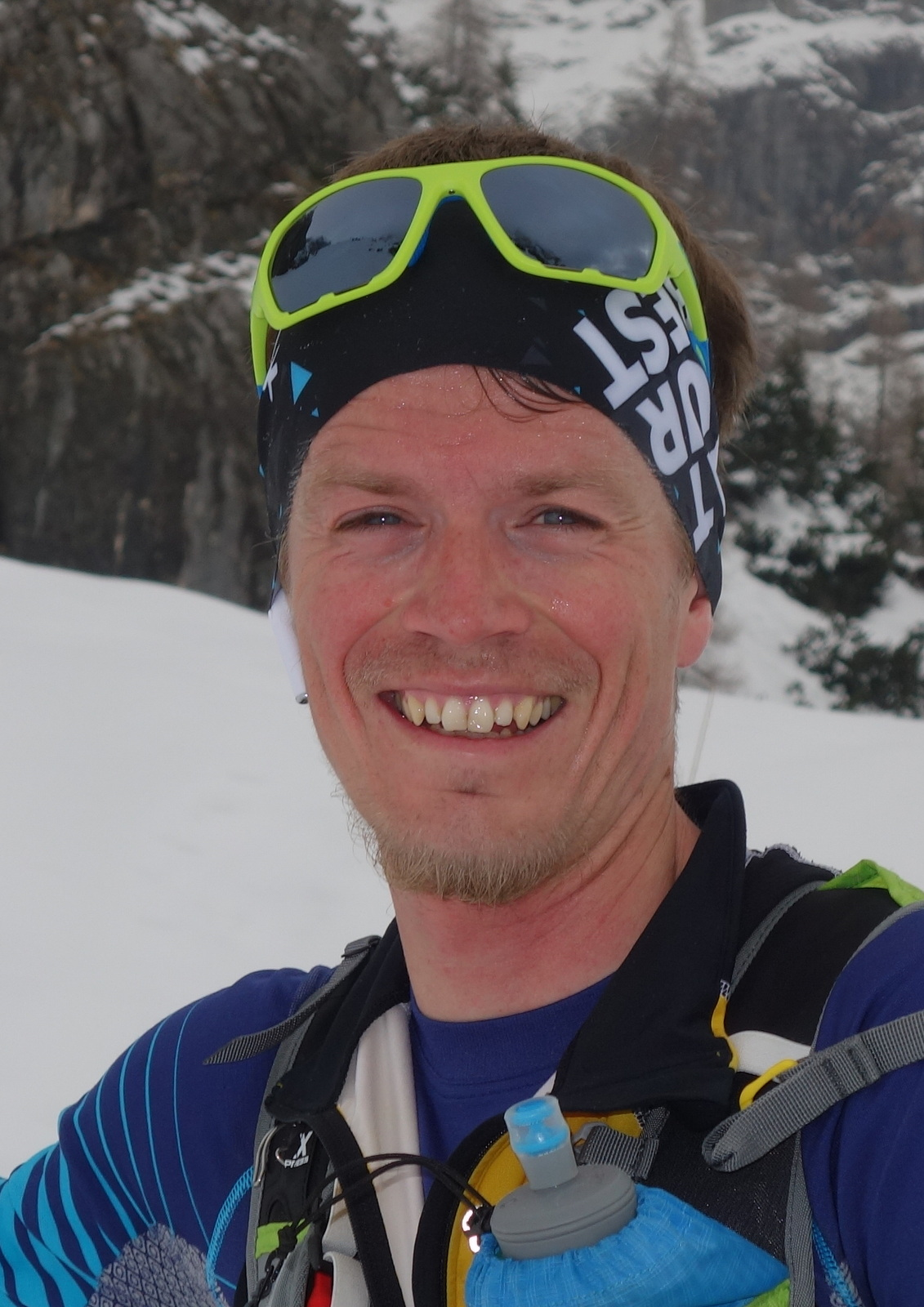

Personal information
- Born: October 19, 1985 (age 40) Ljubljana, SFR Yugoslavia

Sport
- Sport: Skiing

Nejc Kuhar (born October 19, 1985) is a Slovenian ski mountaineer.

Kuhar was born in Ljubljana. He started ski mountaineering in 2000 and competed first in the Rally Jezersko event in 2001. He has been member of the national selection since 2004 and lives in Kokra.

== Selected results ==
- 2006:
  - 4th, World Championship team race (together with Anže Šenk, Jernej Karničar and Tomaž Soklič)
- 2009:
  - 9th, European Championship combination ranking
- 2010:
  - 6th, World Championship relay race (together with Anže Šenk, Matjaž Mikloša and Klemen Triler)
  - 10th, World Championship team race (together with Anže Šenk)
  - 1st, Mountain Attack tour
- 2011:
  - 7th, World Championship relay, together with Anže Šenk, Matjaž Mikloša and Klemen Triler
  - 8th, World Championship vertical race
  - 4th, Trofeo Mezzalama, together with Alessandro Follador and Thomas Trettel
- 2012:
  - 3rd, Sellaronda Skimarathon, together with Filippo Beccari
  - 8th, Pierra Menta, together with Filippo Beaccari
