= Andrew McNab =

Canadian ski mountaineer (born 1984)

Personal information
- Born: April 11, 1984 (age 42) Revelstoke, British Columbia, Canada

Sport
- Sport: Skiing
Medal record
Men's ski mountaineering
Representing Canada
North American Championship
Silver medal – second place	2012 Colorado	Sprint

Andrew McNab (born April 11, 1984) is a Canadian ski mountaineer and member of the national selection.

McNab was born in Revelstoke, British Columbia, and studied at Thompson Rivers University.

== Selected results ==
- 2012:
  - 2nd (and 4th in the World ranking), North American Championship, sprint
  - 6th (and 8th in the World ranking), North American Championship, individual
  - 6th (and 8th in the World ranking), North American Championship, total ranking
