= Andreas Grassl =

German previously unidentified man (born 1984)

- Born: October 25, 1984 (age 42)
- Known for: Mute and distressed man found on English beach

Andreas Grassl (born 25 October 1984) is a German man found in England in April 2005, who remained unidentified for a long time due to his refusal to speak, communicating instead through drawing and playing the piano. The story drew media attention, with Grassl being dubbed the "Piano Man" until he revealed his identity four months after his appearance.

== Return to Germany ==
The Daily Mirror article said that the Piano Man had told the medical staff that he was a gay German man, who had come to Britain on a Eurostar train after losing his job in Paris. According to the newspaper's source, the man said that he had been planning to commit suicide when he was discovered on the beach in Sheerness, that he did not talk to the police due to his distressed state, and that he then continued to act mute. The unnamed source also suggested that the Piano Man used to work with the mentally ill, and thus was able to mimic their behaviour, thereby fooling the hospital staff. According to the tabloids, he was flown back to Germany where his father (a farmer) and his two sisters live.

Later the same day the BBC reported that the German foreign ministry had confirmed that the man was a 20 -year-old Bavarian who had flown home on 20 August. The German embassy in London confirmed that they had been contacted by the Little Brook Hospital, confirmed the man's identity and provided him with replacement travel documents.

Following the media reports, the West Kent NHS and Social Care Trust issued a statement stating that the man was no longer in the care of the trust, that he had been "discharged from [their] care following a marked improvement in his condition", and that their "involvement with this man has now ceased and will not be resuming at any stage". The statement also expressed that no further information was to be released.

In a follow-up to the story on 24 August, the Daily Mirror named the man as Andreas Grassl and published an interview with his parents, farmers in Prosdorf, a village belonging to Waldmünchen in the Cham district of the Upper Palatinate in eastern Bavaria. According to the interview, their son had upon his return told them that he had "no idea what happened to me. I just suddenly woke up and realised who I was." Grassl's father expressed anger with some allegations made in the original Mirror article, in particular the suggestions that his son's behaviour during treatment was not genuine. "I know he would never make something like this up," the father said. He denied that his son was gay, and told the newspaper that his son in fact was an accomplished piano player, albeit not to a professional standard. Grassl's lawyer said he might have experienced a psychotic episode.

Friends of Grassl told The Times that he had spent hours in internet chat rooms, where he was known as "Scatman", and that he was a columnist for a local newspaper, writing about pop music.

In October 2014, AllthePigs Theatre Company announced that they were writing a play based on the theories and events at the New Diorama in London.
