= Barbara Gruber =

German ski mountaineer (born 1977)

Personal information
- Born: 15 December 1977 (age 48) Bad Reichenhall, Germany

Sport
- Sport: Skiing
- Club: Dynafit team
Medal record
Representing Germany
Ski mountaineering
Bronze medal – third place	2005 European Championship	Vertical race
Bronze medal – third place	2005 European Championship	Team
Bronze medal – third place	2005 European Championship	Relay

Barbara Gruber (born 15 December 1977) is a German ski mountaineer and mountain biker.

Gruber was born in Bad Reichenhall. Like her parents and siblings, she passed the framer training. She started with sports after the birth of her son Johannes, at first with mountain biking. She became a member of the German ski mountaineering team and has been a member of the international Dynafit team since 2005. Together with her husband Herbert she lives near Weißbach bei Lofer.

== Selected results ==
=== Ski mountaineering ===
- 2004:
  - 1st, Mountain Attack race
- 2005:
  - 1st, German Championship single
  - 1st, Mountain Attack race
  - 2nd, European Cup team (together with Judith Graßl)
  - 3rd, European Championship vertical race
  - 3rd, European Championship team race (together with Judith Graßl)
  - 3rd, European Championship relay race (together with Judith Graßl and Silvia Treimer)
  - 7th, World Cup team (together with Judith Graßl)
- 2006:
  - 1st, German Championship single
  - 1st, Mountain Attack race
  - 4th, World Championship relay race (together with Judith Graßl, Silvia Treimer and Stefanie Koch)
  - 8th, World Championship vertical race
- 2007:
  - 1st, German Championship vertical race
  - 2nd, Mountain Attack race
  - 4th, European Championship vertical race
- 2008:
  - 1st, German Championship single
  - 1st, German Championship vertical race
  - 1st, Mountain Attack race
  - 1st, Hochgrat ski rallye
- 2009:
  - 1st, German Championship vertical race
- 2010:
  - 1st, Mountain Attack tour
  - 2nd, Sellaronda Skimarathon, together with Judith Graßl
- 2011:
  - 1st, Champ Or Cramp
  - 2nd, Sellaronda Skimarathon, together with Patrizia Wacker
- 2012:
  - 8th, European Championship single
  - 10th, European Championship vertical race
  - 1st, Sellaronda Skimarathon, together with Judith Graßl
  - 1st, Hochgrat ski rallye

=== Mountain biking ===
- 2007:
  - 1st, "Glockner‌könig light" race
  - 1st, "Hochstein‌trophy"
  - 1st, St.Veit mountain race team
  - 1st, Heutal mountain single time race
  - 1st, Bike Festival Kaprun
  - 1st, "Saalach‌taltrophy"
