= Laurent Fabre =

French ski mountaineer (1968–2012)

Laurent Fabre (French pronunciation: [lɔʁɑ̃ fabʁ]; 1968 - August 22, 2012) was a French ski mountaineer, high mountain guide and non-commissioned officer of the Chasseurs Alpins corps. He served at the 93rd Mountain Artillery Regiment and was married to the ski mountaineer Valentine Fabre. He was killed in a training accident on the Mont Blanc massif while serving as an instructor at the High Mountain Military School. He was married to the ski mountaineer Valentine Favre.

== Selected results ==
- 2000:
  - 6th, Patrouille des Glaciers (international military teams ranking), together with Sgt chef Tony Sbalbi and Adj Patrick Rassat
- 2001:
  - 6th, European Championship team race (together with Tony Sbalbi)
- 2002:
  - 1st, Corssa race (together with Olivier Pasteur)
  - 2nd, Trophée des Gastlosen (together with Olivier Pasteur)

=== Pierra Menta ===
- 1999: 9th, together with Tony Sbalbi
- 2002: 9th, together with Olivier Pasteur
- 2003: 8th, together with Gabriel Degabai
