= Georg Nickaes =

German ski mountaineer

Personal information
- Born: 12 June 1971 (age 55) Bad Reichenhall, Germany

Sport
- Sport: Skiing
Medal record
Representing Germany
Ski mountaineering
Bronze medal – third place	2005 European Championship	Relay

Georg "Schorsch" Nickaes (born 12 June 1971) is a German ski mountaineer and speaker of the German ski mountaineering team.

Nickaes was born in Bad Reichenhall. He enjoys also mountain running and ice climbing, and finished the army mountain guide training in 1994. He started in international ski mountaineering races after 1999. He was buried with two companions by a snow slab during a three-day ski mountaineering a few years ago, but they freed themselves. Nickaes is married with one child.

== Selected results ==
- 1999:
  - German record time, "DIAMIR-Race"
- 2001:
  - German record time, Trofeo Mezzalama (together with Gerhard Reithmeier and Matthias Robl)
  - 2nd, Mountain Attack race
- 2002:
  - 3rd, "International Open", Saalbach
- 2004:
  - 3rd, German Championship single
  - 7th, Mountain Attack race
- 2005:
  - 5th, German Championship single
  - 3rd, European Championship relay race (together with Franz Graßl, Stefan Klinger and Toni Steurer)
- 2006:
  - 5th, World Championship relay race (together with Toni Steurer, Franz Graßl and Martin Echtler)

=== Patrouille des Glaciers ===
- 2006: 7th ("seniors II" ranking), together with Wolfgang Palzer and Tim Stachel
- 2008: 2nd ("seniors I" ranking), together with Gerhard Reithmeier and Benedikt Böhm
