= Travis Scheefer =

American ski mountaineer (born 1985)

Personal information
- Full name: Travis R. Scheefer
- Born: August 14, 1985 (age 41)

Sport
- Sport: Skiing
Medal record
Men's ski mountaineering
Representing United States
North American Championship
Bronze medal – third place	2012 Colorado	Sprint

Travis R. Scheefer (born August 14, 1985) is an American ski mountaineer and mountain biker.

Scheefer currently lives at Gunnison, Colorado.

== Selected results (ski mountaineering) ==
- 2010:
  - 10th, World Championship, relay, together with Max Taam, Ben Parsons and Brandon French
- 2012:
  - 3rd (and 6th in the World ranking), North American Championship, sprint
  - 7th (and 9th in the World ranking), North American Championship, individual
  - 7th (and 9th in the World ranking), North American Championship, total ranking
