= Luke Nelson (ski mountaineer) =

American ski mountaineer (born 1980)

Personal information
- Born: September 16, 1980 (age 45)

Sport
- Sport: Skiing
Medal record
Men's ski mountaineering
Representing United States
North American Championship
Silver medal – second place	2012 Colorado	Individual

Luke Nelson (born September 16, 1980) is an American ski mountaineer.

Nelson attended the Blackfoot High School in Idaho, and studied at Idaho State University until 2006. He started skiing in 2005. He lives in Pocatello, Idaho.

== Selected results ==
- 2012:
  - 2nd (and 4th in the World ranking), North American Championship, individual
  - 2nd (and 4th in the World ranking), North American Championship, total ranking
