= Sari Anderson =

American multisport and endurance athlete

Personal information
- Full name: Sarah R. Anderson
- Born: December 30, 1978 (age 47)

Sport
- Sport: Skiing
Medal record
Women's ski mountaineering
Representing United States
North American Championship
| Silver medal – second place | 2012 Colorado | Individual |
| Bronze medal – third place | 2012 Colorado | Sprint |

Sarah "Sari" R. Anderson (born December 30, 1978) from Carbondale, Colorado, is an American multisport and endurance athlete.

Anderson grew up in Rhode Island and played ice hockey and soccer before she moved to Colorado, where she started competing in trail running, snowshoe, and mountain biking events. She was introduced to ski mountaineer by Pete Swenson and Monique Merrill introduced in 2007. She is married with two children.

== Selected results (ski mountaineering) ==
- 2009:
  - 7th, Pierra Menta, together with Monique Merrill
- 2012:
  - 2nd, North American Championship, individual
  - 2nd, North American Championship, total ranking
  - 3rd, North American Championship, sprint
