= Silvia Treimer =

German ski mountaineer (born 1970)

Personal information
- Born: 29 March 1970 (age 56) Berchtesgaden, West Germany

Sport
- Sport: Skiing
Medal record
Representing Germany
Ski mountaineering
Bronze medal – third place	2005 European Championship	Relay

Silvia Treimer (born 29 March 1970) is a German ski mountaineer.

Treimer was born in Berchtesgaden and lives in Rosenheim. She is married to the mountain guide Christian Treimer with one daughter named Anna, and works as judicial officer in Rosenheim.

== Selected results ==
- 2003:
  - 3rd, European Cup team
  - 5th, European Championship team race (together with Christine Echtler-Schleich)
- 2004:
  - 3rd, European Cup team
  - 9th, World Championship team race (together with Christine Echtler-Schleich)
  - 10th, World Championship combination ranking
- 2005:
  - 3rd, European Championship relay race (together with Judith Graßl and Barbara Gruber)
  - 3rd, Mountain Attack race
  - 9th, European Championship team race (together with Christine Echtler-Schleich)
- 2006:
  - 4th, World Championship relay race (together with Judith Graßl, Barbara Gruber and Stefanie Koch)
  - 10th, World Championship team race (together with Christine Echtler-Schleich)
- 2007:
  - 2nd, German Championship team
  - 3rd, Trofeo Mezzalama (together with Judith Graßl and Stefanie Koch)
  - 3rd, Mountain Attack race
  - 4th, European Championship relay race (together with Judith Graßl and Stefanie Koch)

=== Patrouille des Glaciers ===
- 2006: 3rd, together with Judith Graßl and Stefanie Koch
- 2008: 4th, together with Judith Graßl and Silvia Treimer
