= Hansjörg Lunger =

Italian ski mountaineer

Personal information
- Born: 4 September 1964 (age 61) Karneid, Italy

Sport
- Sport: Skiing
Medal record
Ski mountaineering
Representing Italy
World Championships
Gold medal – first place	2006 World Championship	Relay
Silver medal – second place	2008 World Championship	Team

Hansjörg Lunger (born 4 September 1964) is an Italian ski mountaineer.

Lunger was born in Karneid. He started ski mountaineering in 1985, competed first in 2003 and was member of the national team after 2006. Lunger is dairyman of the Schutzhaus Latzfonser Kreuz, a mountain hut in the Sarntal Alps. His daughter Tamara is also a competition ski mountaineer.

== Selected results ==
- 2004:
  - 8th (and 1st in "seniors II" class ranking), Patrouille des Glaciers (together with Oswald Santin and Manfred Dorfmann)
- 2005:
  - 1st, Sellaronda Skimarathon (together with Alberto Gerardini)
- 2006:
  - 1st, World Championship relay race (together with Manfred Reichegger, Dennis Brunod and Guido Giacomelli)
  - 1st, Adamello Ski Raid (together with Guido Giacomelli and Mirco Mezzanotte)
  - 2nd, "Fitschi Dachstein Xtreme" race
  - 5th, World Championship team race (together with Guido Giacomelli)
- 2007:
  - 1st and course record, Sellaronda Skimarathon (together with Guido Giacomelli)
  - 2nd, Mountain Attack race
  - 3rd, Traça Catalana race
- 2008:
  - 1st and course record, Sellaronda Skimarathon (together with Guido Giacomelli)
  - 2nd, World Championship team race (together with Guido Giacomelli)
  - 2nd, Mountain Attack race
  - 9th, World Cup race, Val d'Aran
- 2010:
  - 1st, Sellaronda Skimarathon (together with Guido Giacomelli)

=== Pierra Menta ===
- 2006: 2nd, together with Guido Giacomelli
- 2007: 2nd, together with Guido Giacomelli
- 2008: 2nd, together with Guido Giacomelli

=== Trofeo Mezzalama ===
- 2005: 4th, together with Alexander Lugger and Olivier Nägele
- 2007: 3rd, together with Dennis Brunod and Manfred Reichegger
