= Nina Cook Silitch =

American ski mountaineer

Nina Silitch
Personal information
- Full name: Nina Cook Silitch
- Born: December 5, 1972 (age 53) Boston, Massachusetts, U.S.

Sport
- Sport: Ski mountaineering
- Club: Chamonix

World Cup career
- Indiv. podiums: 13
- Indiv. wins: 9
Medal record
Representing United States

Nina Cook Silitch (born December 5, 1972) is an American ski mountaineer, is married to Michael Silitch, has 2 children; Birken and Anders Silitch.

== Selected results ==
- 2010:
  - 1st, World Championship team race, together with Jari Kirkland
- 2011:
  - 1st, World Championship relay (together with Jari Kirkland and Janelle Smiley)
  - 1st, World Championship team race (together with Janelle Smiley)
  - 1st, World Championship sprint race. (Individual)

=== Pierra Menta ===
- 2009: 1st, together with Lyndsay Meyer
- 2010: 1st, together with Lyndsay Meyer
- 2011: 1st, together with Veronika Swidrak
- 2012: 1st, together with Valentine Fabre

=== Patrouille des Glaciers ===
- 2010: 1st (and 1st in the "international civilian women" ranking), together with Lyndsay Meyer and Monique Merrill

=== Trofeo Mezzalama ===
- 2011: 1st, together with Valentine Fabre and Lyndsay Meyer
