= Matteo Pedergnana =

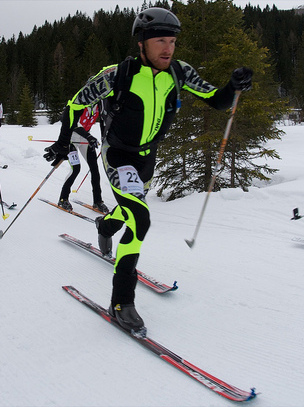
- Pedergnana (N° 22); 2010 Palaronda SkiAlp

Personal information
- Born: 14 August 1980 (age 45)

Sport
- Sport: Skiing
- Club: Sci Club Alta Valtellina
Medal record
Ski mountaineering
| Gold medal – first place | 2005 European Championship | Relay |

Matteo Pedergnana (born 14 August 1980) from Valfurva is an Italian ski mountaineer. He is member of the Sci Club Alta Valtellina as well as member of the national team.

== Selected results ==
Pedergnana placed third in the 2002 World Championship single race ("espoirs" class) and won four times the Pierra Menta (1999/2000/2001/2002) in younger class events, before he competed in "senior" events.

- 2003:
  - 8th, Trofeo Mezzalama (together with Matteo Riz and Mario Scanu)
- 2005:
  - 1st, European Championship relay race (together with Guido Giacomelli, Dennis Brunod and Manfred Reichegger)
- 2010:
  - 2nd, Sellaronda Skimarathon, together with Thomas Martini
