= Benedikt Böhm =

German extreme ski mountaineer (born 1977)

Personal information
- Born: 15 August 1977 (age 48) Munich, West Germany

Sport
- Sport: Skiing
- Club: Dynafit Gore-Tex team
Medal record
Representing Germany

Benedikt "Bene" Böhm (born 15 August 1977 in Munich) is a German extreme ski mountaineer and alpinist. Together with Sebastian Haag, he has set records in speed ski mountaineering on Muztagata and the Gasherbrum II.

Böhm grew up with five siblings in Harlaching, a borough of Munich. One of his brothers is the German artist Corbinian Böhm. Böhm is a member of the national German Skimountaineering Team and member of the Dynafit Gore-Tex team. He is the CEO of Dynafit, an outdoor equipment retailer.

== Selected results ==
- 2004:
  - 5th, German Championship
- 2005:
  - 5th, German Championship
  - speed record in high altitude mountaineering with downhill skiing at the Muztagata together with Sebastian Haag under the leadership of Matthias Robl, 23 August 2005
- 2006:
  - speed record in high altitude mountaineering with downhill skiing at the Gasherbrum II together with Sebastian Haag under the leadership of Luis Stitzinger, 3 August 2006

=== Patrouille des Glaciers ===
- 2008: 2nd ("seniors I" ranking), together with Georg Nickaes and Gerhard Reithmeier
- 2010: 2nd ("seniors II" ranking), together with Javier Martín de Villa and Pete Swenson
