= Gerhard Reithmeier =

German ski mountaineer (born 1977)

Personal information
- Born: 26 June 1977 (age 49)

Sport
- Sport: Skiing
Medal record
Representing Germany

Gerhard Reithmeier (born 26 June 1977) from Bergen is a German ski mountaineer.

== Selected results ==
- 2001:
  - German record time, Trofeo Mezzalama (together with Georg Nickaes and Matthias Robl)
- 2004:
  - 4th, German Championship
  - 11th, World Championship relay race (together with Stefan Klinger, Tim Stachel and Toni Steurer)
- 2006:
  - 6th, German Championship
- 2008:
  - 2nd ("seniors I" ranking), Patrouille des Glaciers (together with Georg Nickaes and Benedikt Böhm)
