= Andreas Strobel =

Personal information
- Born: 13 May 1972 (age 54) Selb, Germany

Sport
- Sport: Skiing
Medal record
Representing Germany

Andreas Strobel (born 13 May 1972) is a German ski mountaineer and marathon mountain biker.

Strobel was born in Selb, and started bike sports as condition training in 1991. After bad results at the "Ronda Extrema" race in Riva del Garda in 1997, he intensified the training. He is also member of the national ski mountaineering team.

== Selected results ==
=== Ski mountaineering ===
- 2006:
  - 4th, German Championship single
- 2005:
  - 2nd, German Championship vertical race
- 2007:
  - 2nd, Dammkarwurm race
- 2008:
  - 1st, German Championship vertical race
  - 3rd, German Championship single
  - 3rd, German Championship team
  - 6th, World Championship relay race (together with Toni Steurer, Stefan Klinger and Konrad Lex)
- 2009:
  - 2nd, German Championship vertical race
  - 9th, European Championship relay race (together with Toni Steurer, Konrad Lex and Alexander Schuster)
- 2010:
  - 9th, World Championship relay race (together with Martin Echtler, Konrad Lex and Alexander Schuster)

=== Mountain biking ===
- 2003:
  - 1st, Transrockies race
  - 3rd, Transalpchallenge
- 2004:
  - 1st, Bavarian Championship
  - 1st, MV-Marathon serie
  - 2nd, Cape Epic race
  - 3rd, German Championship of bike marathon
- 2005:
  - 1st, Transcreta race
- 2006:
  - 1st, Bavarian Championship
  - 1st, Ritchey MTB Challenge
