= Pete Swenson =

American ski mountaineer

Personal information
- Born: December 25, 1967 (age 58)

Sport
- Sport: Skiing
Medal record
Representing United States

Pete Swenson (born December 25, 1967) from Breckenridge, Colorado, is an American ski mountaineer and Competition Director of the United States Ski Mountaineering Association (USSMA).

Swanson attended the Colorado College until 1990.

== Selected results ==
- 2006:
  - 9th, World Championship, relay, together with Cary Smith, Chris Kroger and Steve Romeo
- 2009:
  - 1st, US Ski Mountaineering National Championship, Jackson Hole
- 2010:
  - 2nd (seniors II), Patrouille des Glaciers, together with Benedikt Böhm and Javier Martín de Villa
