= Valentine Fabre =

French ski mountaineer

Personal information
- Born: 26 September 1976 (age 49)

Sport
- Sport: Skiing
Medal record
Ski mountaineering
Representing France
World Championships
Bronze medal – third place	2008 World Championship	Relay

Valentine Fabre (French pronunciation: [valɑ̃tin fabʁ]; born 26 September 1976) is a French ski mountaineer. She works as a military physician in the 93rd Mountain Artillery Regiment and was married to the late ski mountaineer Laurent Fabre.

== Selected results ==
- 2005:
  - 2nd, French Championship team
  - 4th, European Championship relay race (together with Nathalie Bourillon and Véronique Lathuraz)
- 2008:
  - 3rd, World Championship relay race (together with Corinne Favre, Véronique Lathuraz and Nathalie Bourillon)
  - 5th, World Championship team race (together with Véronique Lathuraz)
- 2010:
  - 5th, World Championship relay race (together with Sandrine Favre and Laëtitia Roux)
- 2021:
  - Set women's speed record for traverse of the Haute Route of 26 hours, 21 minutes with teammate Hillary Gerardi.

=== Pierra Menta ===
- 2006: 5th, together with Muriel Vaudey
- 2007: 3rd, together with Véronique Lathuraz
- 2008: 9th, together with Magali Jacquemoud
- 2012: 5th, together with Nina Cook Silitch

=== Trofeo Mezzalama ===
- 2011: 6th, together with Nina Cook Silitch and Lyndsay Meyer
