= Marion Bertrand =

French alpine skier (born 1984)

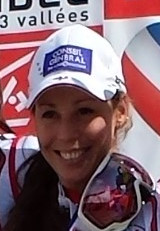
- Marion Bertrand in 2014.

Personal information
- Born: 2 November 1984 (age 41) Grasse, France
- Height: 1.63 m (5 ft 4 in)
- Weight: 58 kg (128 lb)

Sport
- Country: France
- Sport: Alpine skiing

Marion Bertrand (born 2 November 1984 in Grasse, France) is an alpine skier from France. She competed for France at the 2014 Winter Olympics in the alpine skiing events.
