= Judith Graßl =

German ski mountaineer (born 1968)

Personal information
- Born: 6 April 1968 (age 58) Berchtesgaden, West Germany

Sport
- Sport: Skiing
Medal record
Representing Germany
Ski mountaineering
Bronze medal – third place	2005 European Championship	Team
Bronze medal – third place	2005 European Championship	Relay

Judith Graßl (born 6 April 1968) is a German ski mountaineer.

Graßl was born in Berchtesgaden. She is married to the ski mountaineer Franz Graßl with two children. They live in Ramsau bei Berchtesgaden.

== Selected results ==
- 2003:
  - 4th, European Championship single race
  - 5th, European Championship team race (together with Traudl Maurer)
  - 6th, European Championship combination ranking
- 2004:
  - 1st, German Championship single
- 2005:
  - 2nd, European Cup team (together with Barbara Gruber)
  - 3rd, European Championship relay race (together with Barbara Gruber and Silvia Treimer)
  - 3rd, European Championship (together with Barbara Gruber)
  - 7th, World Cup team (together with Barbara Gruber)
  - 9th, European Championship single race
- 2006:
  - 2nd, German Championship single
  - 4th, World Championship relay race (together with Barbara Gruber, Silvia Treimer and Stefanie Koch)
  - 4th, World Championship team race (together with Stefanie Koch)
- 2007:
  - 2nd, Sellaronda Skimarathon (together with Stefanie Koch)
  - 3rd, German Championship single
  - 3rd, Trofeo Mezzalama (together with Stefanie Koch and Silvia Treimer)
  - 4th, European Championship team race (together with Stefanie Koch)
  - 4th, European Championship (together with Stefanie Koch and Silvia Treimer)
  - 7th, European Championship combination ranking
  - 8th, European Championship single race
- 2008:
  - 1st, German Championship team
  - 3rd, German Championship single
  - 3rd, German Championship vertical race
  - 3rd, Rofan Xtreme
  - 6th, World Championship team race (together with Stefanie Koch)
  - 7th, Pierra Menta (together with Stefanie Koch)
- 2010:
  - 2nd, Sellaronda Skimarathon, together with Barbara Gruber
- 2012:
  - 1st, Sellaronda Skimarathon, together with Barbara Gruber

=== Patrouille des Glaciers ===
- 2006: 3rd, together with Silvia Treimer and Stefanie Koch
- 2008: 4th, together with Stefanie Koch and Silvia Treimer
