= Fanny Chmelar =

German alpine skier (born 1985)

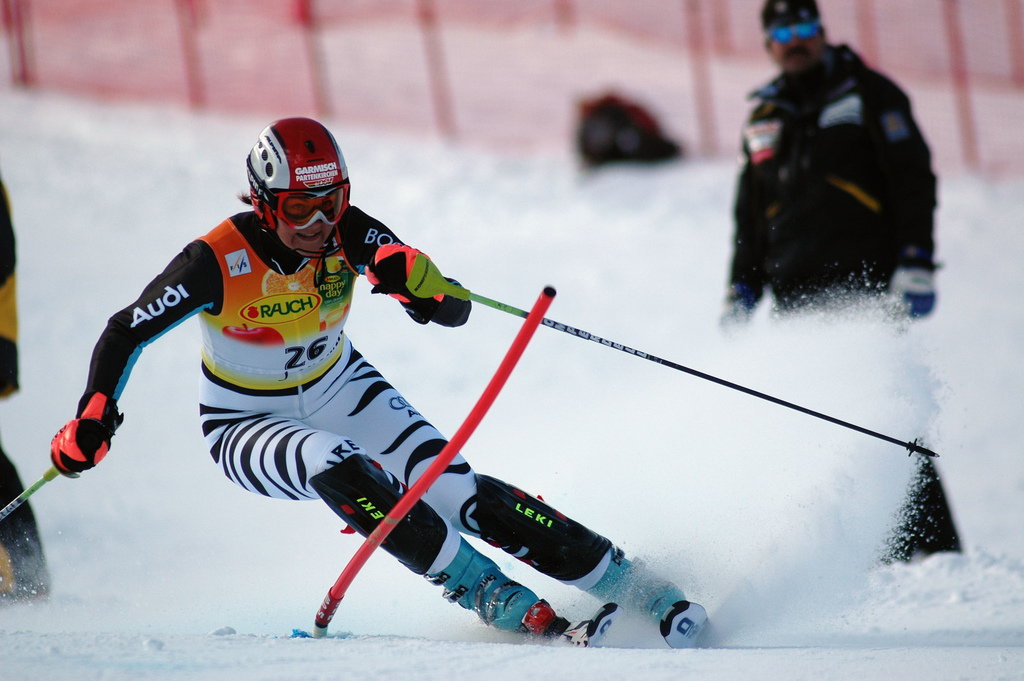
- Chmelar in Aspen, 2006

Personal information
- Born: 31 October 1985 (age 41) Weilheim, Bavaria, West Germany
- Height: 187 cm (6 ft 2 in)

Skiing career
- Sport: Alpine skiing ♀
- Club: Skiclub Partenkirchen, Germany
- Retired: 10 March 2013
- Disciplines: Slalom and Giant slalom

World Cup
- Podiums: 1
- Updated on 3 December 2025

Fanny Chmelar (German pronunciation: [ˈfani ˈʃmɪːlaʁ]; born 31 October 1985) is a German former alpine skier who largely competed in Slalom.

== Biography ==
Fanny Chmelar was born in Weilheim in Oberbayern, Bavaria, Germany on 31 October 1985.

Chmelar first competed in a FIS event in Austria in December 2000 at age 16, where she finished 34th in the Slalom. Two years later, she would make her European Cup debut. Earning two victories and 12 podiums over the course of her European Cup career.

Chmelar made her first appearance in the FIS Alpine Ski World Cup during the 2004–05 season, over the course of her World Cup career, she had one podium finish, a second place in the slalom at Åre, Sweden in 2009. 2009 and 2010 would be the high point of her career, finishing the years 13th and 12th on the World rankings. As well as qualifying for the Slalom at the 2010 Winter Olympics in Vancouver, Canada. Although she did not finish her run.

After poor performances and being removed from the national team, Chmelar retired from professional skiing in March 2013, wearing a ballerina's tutu over her ski-suit for her final run. She cited a lack of enjoyment from competitive skiing for her decision to retire. She said that she wished to become a ski instructor.

== In popular culture ==
Chmelar gained widespread notability in the United Kingdom after she was the subject of a question on ITV game show The Chase in 2011, after which host Bradley Walsh burst into laughter, owing to the pronunciation of her name in English, which sounds similar to "fanny smeller", the former word being a slang term for the vagina. In January 2024, she appeared on Michael McIntyre's Big Show, where she played a prank on Walsh, who apologised for his original reaction.
