= Toni Steurer =

German extreme sports athlete

Personal information
- Full name: Anton Steurer
- Born: 1 December 1978 (age 47) Oberstdorf, Germany

Sport
- Sport: Skiing
Medal record
Representing Germany
Ski mountaineering
Bronze medal – third place	2005 European Championship	Relay

Anton "Toni" Steurer (born 1 December 1978) is a German extreme sports athlete and non-commissioned officer.

Steurer was born in Oberstdorf. Having climbed the Eiger Nordwand at the age of seventeen, he is one of the youngest mountaineers to have ever done so. He is currently deployed as a medical service soldier and army mountain guide in Kempten, Germany. He is member of the DAV section Oberstaufen and part of the German skimountaineering team. Besides mountain climbing, he also practices biking, skiing and other sports. In 2002, the UN International Year of Mountains, he and Walter Hölzler from Thalkirchdorf climbed the three summits of Piz Palü in a Hat-trick within 24 hours.

== Selected results ==
=== Mountain running ===
- 2000:
  - 2nd, CISM Military World Games, Kamerun (20 January)
  - German course record, Tour de Matterhorn (together with Matthias Robl and Christian Kerber)

=== Ski mountaineering ===
- 2004:
  - 3rd, German Cup long distance race
  - 11th, World Championship relay race (together with Tim Stachel, Gerhard Reithmeier and Stefan Klinger)
- 2005:
  - 1st, German Cup long distance race
  - 1st, German Championship single
  - 3rd, European Championship relay race (together with Franz Graßl, Stefan Klinger and Georg Nickaes)
  - 6th, European Championship single race
  - 9th, European Championship team race (together with Franz Graßl)
  - 9th, World Cup race, Salt Lake City
- 2006:
  - 3rd, German Cup single
  - 5th, World Championship relay race (together with Franz Graßl, Martin Echtler and Georg Nickaes)
- 2007:
  - 4th, European Championship relay race (together with Konrad Lex, Martin Echtler and Stefan Klinger)
- 2008:
  - 1st, German Cup ranking
  - 2nd, German Championship single
  - 2nd, German Championship vertical race
  - 3rd, German Championship team
  - 6th, World Championship relay race (together with Andreas Strobel, Stefan Klinger and Konrad Lex)
  - 10th, World Championship combination ranking
- 2009
  - 1st, German Championship single
  - 1st, German Championship team
  - 1st, military brigade championship, Hohenzollern stadium in Langdorf (with military equipment)
  - 9th, European Championship relay race (together with Alexander Schuster, Andreas Strobel and Konrad Lex)
- 2011:
  - 6th, World Championship relay, together with Philipp Reiter, Anton Palzer and Konrad Lex

==== Patrouille des Glaciers ====
- 2006: 7th (and 2nd "seniors II" ranking) as well as German record, together with Franz Graßl and Martin Echtler
- 2008: 8th (and 6th in the "international men" ranking), together with Franz Graßl and Stefan Klinger
