= Franz Graßl =

German ski mountaineer (born 1965)

Personal information
- Born: 7 March 1965 (age 61) Berchtesgaden, West Germany

Sport
- Sport: Skiing
Medal record
Representing Germany
Ski mountaineering
Bronze medal – third place	2005 European Championship	Relay

Franz Graßl (born 7 March 1965) is a German ski mountaineer.

Graßl was born in Berchtesgaden. He is member of the Berchtesgaden branch of the German Alpine Club (DAV) and the Bergwacht. He was member of the German ski-mountaineering team until the end of 2006. He is married to the ski mountaineer Judith Graßl with two children. They live in Ramsau bei Berchtesgaden.

== Selected results ==
- 2003:
  - 2nd, German Championship single
- 2004:
  - 1st, German Championship single
  - 2nd, German Cup long distance
  - 5th, Mountain Attack race
- 2005:
  - 3rd, European Championship relay race (together with Toni Steurer, Stefan Klinger and Georg Nickaes)
  - 9th, European Championship team race (together with Toni Steurer)
  - 10th, Trofeo Mezzalama (together with Wolfgang Panzer and Martin Echtler)
- 2006:
  - 1st, German Cup single
  - 5th, World Championship relay race (together with Toni Steurer, Stefan Klinger and Georg Nickaes)
- 2008:
  - 1st, German Championship single
- 2009:
  - 3rd, German Cup vertical race

=== Patrouille des Glaciers ===
- 2006: 7th (and 2nd "seniors II" ranking) as well as German record, together with Toni Steurer and Martin Echtler
- 2008: 8th (and 6th in the "international men" ranking), together with Toni Steurer and Stefan Klinger
