= Maxime Tissot =

French alpine skier (born 1985)

Maxime Tissot (French: [maxim tiso]; born 2 October 1986 in Sallanches) is an alpine skier and soldier from France. He competed for France at the 2010 Winter Olympics where he finished 16th.
