= Reiner Thoni =

Canadian ski mountaineer (born 1984)

Personal information
- Born: August 22, 1984 (age 41) Jasper, Alberta, Canada

Sport
- Sport: Skiing
Medal record
Men's ski mountaineering
Representing Canada
North American Championship
Gold medal – first place	2012 Colorado	Sprint
Gold medal – first place	2012 Colorado	Individual

Reiner Thoni (born August 22, 1984) is a Canadian ski mountaineer and member of the national selection.

Thoni is born in Jasper, Alberta. He lives in Valemount, British Columbia, Canada.

== Selected results ==
- 2012:
  - 1st (and 2nd in the World ranking), North American Championship, sprint
  - 1st (and 3rd in the World ranking), North American Championship, individual
  - 1st (and 3rd in the World ranking), North American Championship, total ranking
