= Michela Azzola =

Italian alpine skier (born 1991)

Michela Azzola (born 20 November 1991) is an Italian alpine skier.

== Career ==
She competed at the 2009 and 2010 Junior World Championships with a 20th place as her best result.

She made her FIS Alpine Ski World Cup debut in October 2012 in Sölden. She collected her first World Cup points in December 2012, finishing 19th in the Semmering slalom. She repeated the placement in January 2013 in Maribor before improving to an 11th place in January 2014 in Bormio. She did not compete in the 2014–15 and 2015–16 World Cup circuits, and competed without finishing a single race in the 2016–17, 2017–18 and 2018–19 World Cup circuits. She also competed in the 2013 World Championships slalom without finishing the race.

She represents the sports club GS Fiamme Gialle.
