= Jari Kirkland =

American ski mountaineer and marathon mountain biker

Jari aka "Yari" Kirkland (born 1976) is an American ski mountaineer and marathon mountain biker. She has been member of the national ski mountaineering selection since 2010.

== Selected results ==
- 2010:
  - 9th, World Championship relay race, together with Molly Zurm and Amy Fulywer
  - 10th, World Championship team race, together with Nina Cook Silitch
- 2011:
  - 7th, World Championship relay, together with Nina Cook Silitch and Janelle Smiley
  - 1st, Power of Four, Aspen Mountain, women's team, together with Eva Hagen
- 2012:
  - 5th, North American Championship, individual
  - 5th, North American Championship, total ranking
  - 7th, North American Championship, sprint
- 2013:
  - 1st, 12 Hours of the Hill of Truth
