= AllthePigs Theatre Company =

- Logo of the AllthePigs Theatre Company
- Type: Theatre group
- Location: London, England, United Kingdom
- Website: allthepigs.co.uk

AllthePigs Theatre Company is an independent theatre company based in London. Their stated mission is to "showcase the hidden gems of the past, champion up-and-coming playwrights, and give both the platform to shine".

== History ==
AllthePigs were formed by Ami Stidolph and Sam Carrack upon graduating the Oxford School of Drama.

The company's first plays were written by first time writers, and were presented at the Hen and Chickens Theatre and played alongside Isabelle Wright's Peepshow.

== Previous productions ==
Name of Play	Writer	Director	Venue	Year
In The Shadow of the Black Dog	Daniel Hallissey		Junkyard Dogs: The Doghouse (Brighton Fringe Festival)	2019
The Piano Man	Devised by the ensemble	Sam Carrack	New Diorama Theatre	2014
Cornwall vs China	Daniel Hallissey	Beth Pitts	The Old Red Lion Theatre	2014
A Beginner's Guide to the Apocalypse	Kieron O'Rourke	Sarah Bradnum	The Vaults	2014
Gizmo Love	John Kolvenbach	Sam Carrack	New Diorama Theatre	2013
Boldy Gone	Kieron O'Rourke	Sam Carrack	The Vaults	2013
Stacy	Jack Thorne (writer)	Sam Carrack	New Diorama Theatre	2012
Scooter Thomas Makes it to the Top of the World	Peter Parnell	Sam Carrack	New Diorama Theatre	2012
AGM	Daniel Hallissey	Sam Carrack	Greenside (Edinburgh Festival Fringe)	2011
Peepshow	Isobelle Wright	Sam Carrack	Greenside (Edinburgh Festival Fringe)	2010 & 2011

== First Time Writers Initiative ==
Running from the beginning the First Time Writers Initiative was set up by the AllthePigs and selects individuals who have never had a play professionally produced before and takes them on a 16-week intensive course of workshops, readings and rehearsals, eventually creating a 30-minute play, and pairing them up with an up-and-coming director.

Each short play then runs alongside a published production as selected by AllthePigs.

From 2010 to 2012 each writer had two performances of their play. In 2013, each writer had a full week of performances.

"This process appears to be an effective one, judging by the high quality of dialogue and characterisation"

== Awards ==
- Peepshow and AGM received a commendation by the National Student Drama Festival and Spotlight Emerging Artists' Award at the Hen and Chickens Theatre.
- Recipients of Old Vic New Voices Start Up Fund in 2011.
