= Janelle Smiley =

American ski mountaineer (born 1981)

Personal information
- Born: 1981 (age 44–45) Aspen, Colorado, United States

Sport
- Sport: Skiing
Medal record
Women's ski mountaineering
Representing United States
North American Championship
Gold medal – first place	2012 Colorado	Individual
Silver medal – second place	2012 Colorado	Sprint

Janelle Smiley (born 1981) is an American ski mountaineer and mountain climber.

Smiley was born in Aspen, Colorado, and lives in Jackson Hole, Wyoming.

== Selected results ==
- 2011:
  - 7th, World Championship, vertical race
  - 7th, World Championship, relay, together with Nina Cook Silitch and Jari Kirkland
  - 8th, World Championship, team, together with Nina Cook Silitch
  - 9th, World Championship, individual
- 2012:
  - 1st, North American Championship, individual
  - 1st, North American Championship, total ranking
  - 2nd, North American Championship, sprint
