= Ramsau bei Berchtesgaden =

- Municipality
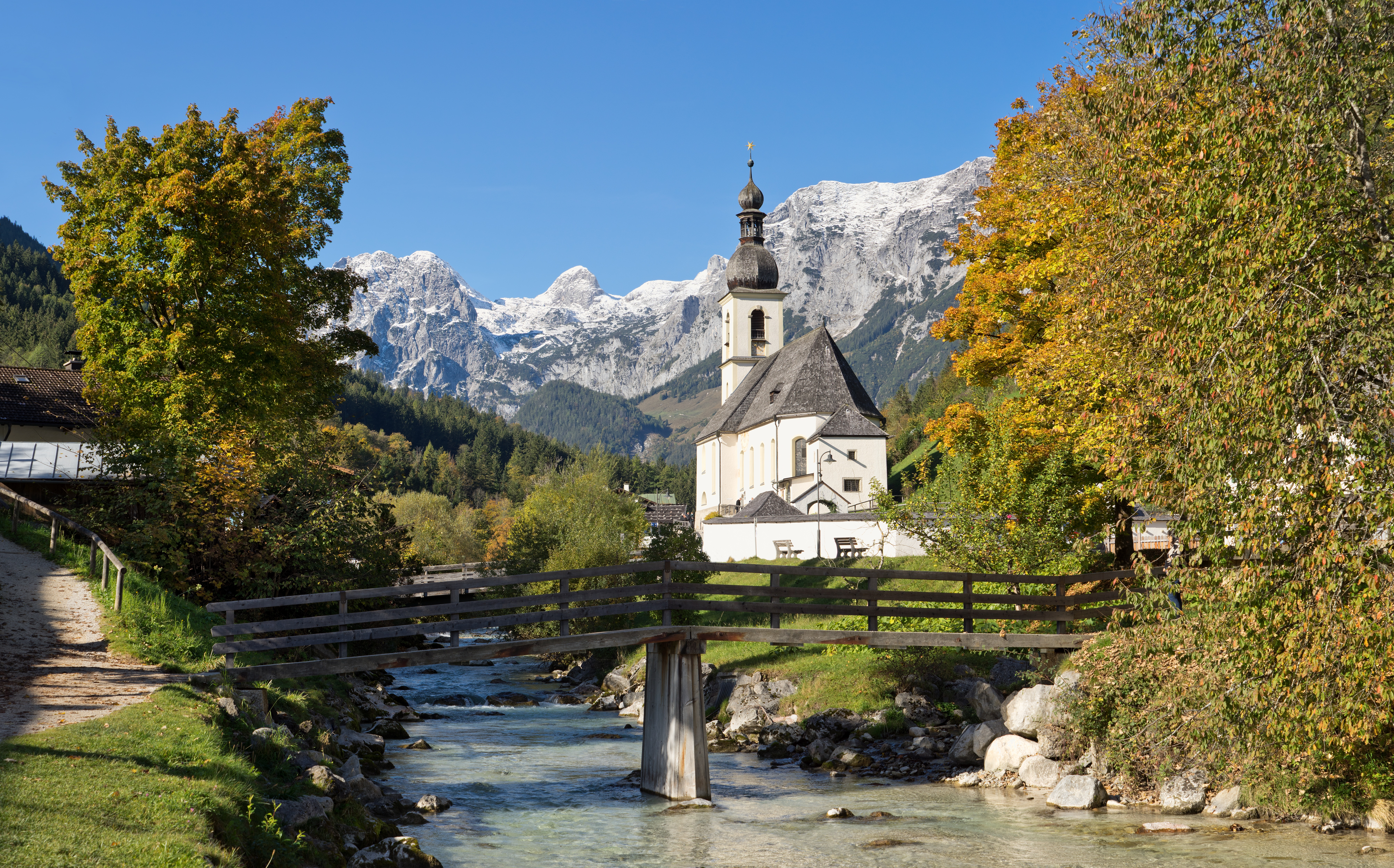
- The Church of St. Sebastian, with the Reiter Alpe in background

- Coat of arms

- Location of Ramsau bei Berchtesgaden within Berchtesgadener Land district
- Interactive map of Ramsau bei Berchtesgaden
- Location within Germany Location within Bavaria
- Coordinates: 47°36′26″N 12°53′42″E
- Country: Germany
- State: Bavaria
- Admin. region: Oberbayern
- District: Berchtesgadener Land

Government
  - Mayor (2020–26): Herbert Gschoßmann (CSU)

Area
  - Total: 129.18 km^{2} (49.88 sq mi)
- Elevation: 670 m (2,200 ft)

Population (2025-12-31)
  - Total: 1,694
  - Density: 13.11/km^{2} (33.96/sq mi)
- Time zone: UTC+01:00 (CET)
  - Summer (DST): UTC+02:00 (CEST)
- Postal codes: 83486
- Dialling codes: 08657
- Vehicle registration: BGL
- Website: www.ramsau.de

Ramsau is a German municipality in the Bavarian Alps with a population of around 1,800. It is a district located in the Berchtesgadener Land in Bavaria, close to the border with Austria, 35 km south of Salzburg and 150 km south-east of Munich. It is situated north of the Berchtesgaden National Park.

Notable sights of Ramsau include the third-highest mountain in Germany, called the Watzmann, Lake Hintersee, and the village's church.

== Gallery ==
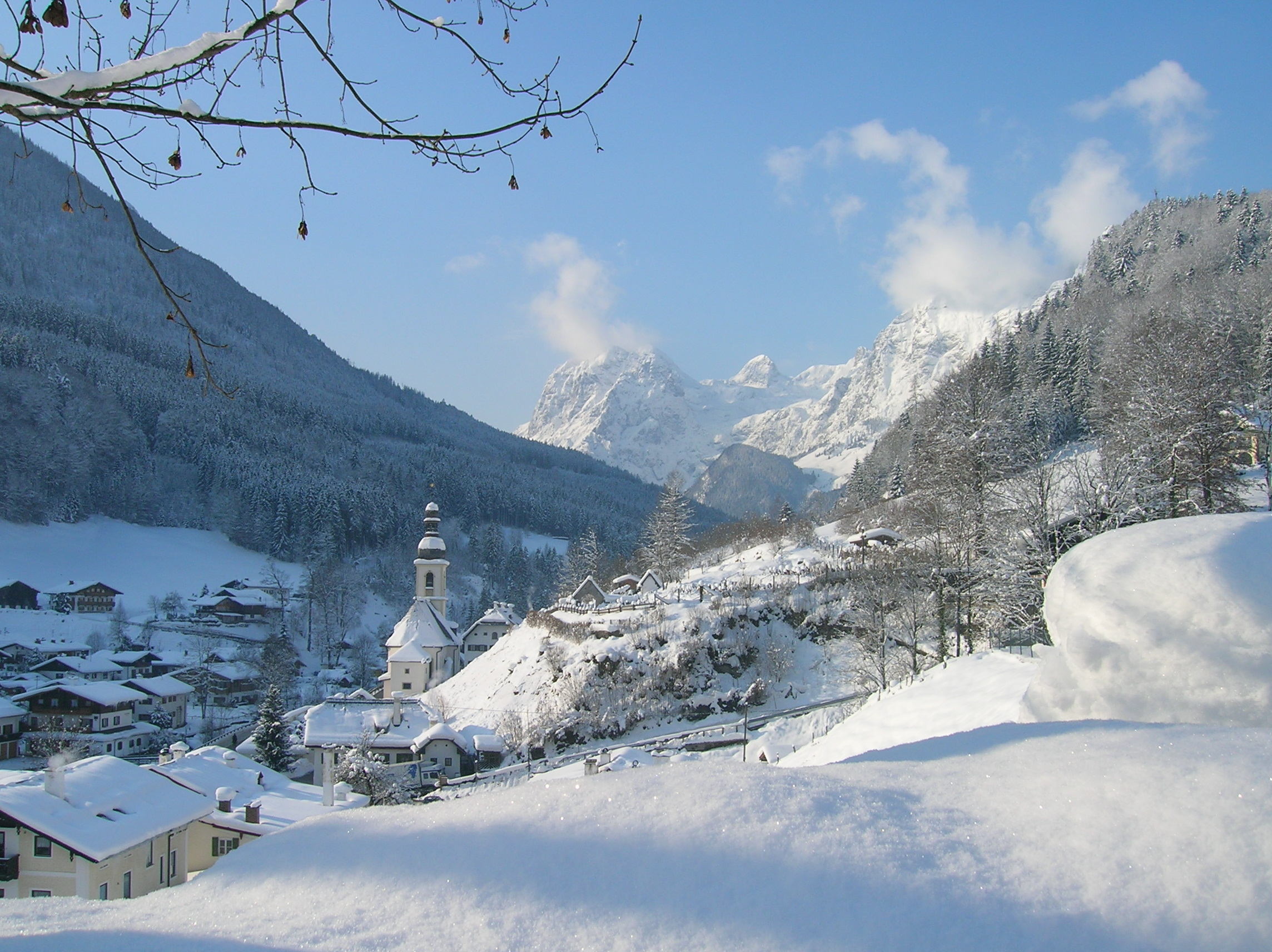
Village of Ramsau

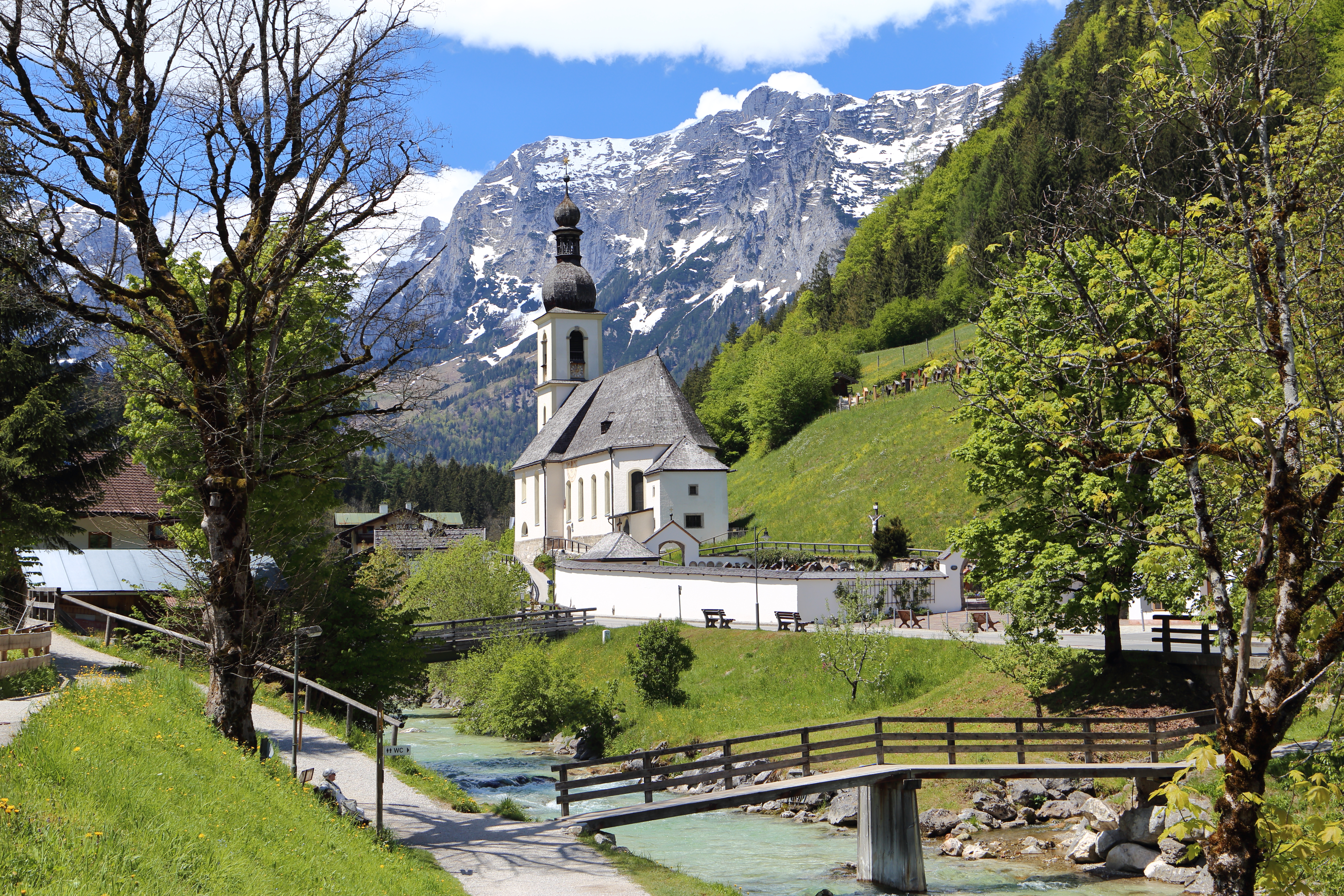
The Church of St. Sebastian

== Notable people ==
- Wolfgang Bartels
- Hans Brandner
- Hermann Buhl
- Mirko Eichhorn
- Carolin Fernsebner
- Franz Graßl
- Hartmut Graßl
- Judith Graßl
- Johann Grill
- Matej Juhart
- Will Klinger-Franken
- Manuel Machata
- Anton Palzer
- Franz Pöschl
- Armin Roßmeier
- Willy Schlieker
