= Melanie Bernier (ski mountaineer) =

Canadian ski mountaineer

Personal information
- Born: April 27, 1981 (age 45)

Sport
- Sport: Skiing
Medal record
Women's ski mountaineering
Representing Canada
North American Championship
Gold medal – first place	2012 Colorado	Sprint

Melanie Bernier (born April 27, 1981) from Quebec is a Canadian ski mountaineer and member of the national selection.

== Selected results ==
- 2010:
  - 7th, World Championship relay race (together with Julie Matteau and Billie Velisek)
  - 9th, World Championship team race (together with Julie Matteau)
- 2011:
  - 5th, World Championship sprint
  - 9th, World Championship team race (together with Julie Matteau)
  - 9th, World Championship vertical, total ranking
  - 10th, World Championship single race
- 2012:
  - 1st, North American Championship, sprint
  - 4th, North American Championship, individual
  - 4th, North American Championship, total ranking
