= Power of Four =

Power of Four, The Power of Four, or (The) Power of 4 may refer to:

== Entertainment ==
- "The Power of Four", a 2005 song by Neil Myers, a joint anthem composed for the British & Irish Lions rugby union team
- "The Power of Four" (Battle for Dream Island), a 2025 web series episode
- The Powerpuff Girls: The Power of Four, a 2017 five-part television film consisting of five episodes of The Powerpuff Girls
- TMNT: Power of 4, a 2006 mobile game

== Mathematics ==
- "Power of four", a number of the form 4^{n} (a subset of powers of two)
- Fourth power, a number of the form n^{4}
