= Dent de Combette =

Mountain in Switzerland

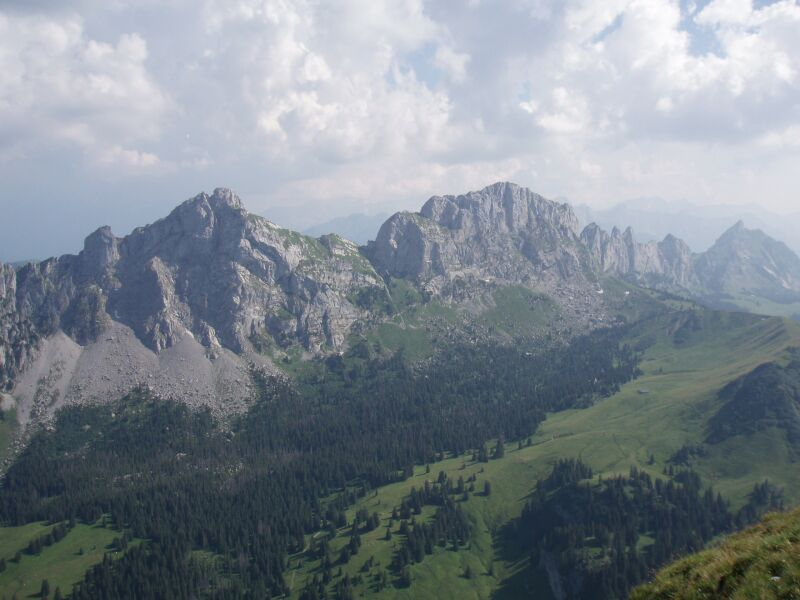
- Dent de Ruth (left), Dent de Savigny (centre) and Dent de Combette (far-right)

Highest point
- Elevation: 2,082 m (6,831 ft)
- Prominence: 242 m (794 ft)
- Parent peak: Dent de Savigny
- Coordinates: 46°31′39.4″N 7°12′13.6″E

Geography
- Location within Switzerland
- Location: Vaud, Switzerland
- Parent range: Bernese Alps

The Dent de Combette (2,082 m) is a mountain of the western Bernese Alps, located north of Rougemont in the Swiss canton of Vaud. It lies south of the border with the canton of Fribourg, on the chain culminating at the Dent de Savigny.

A secondary summit on the south side of the mountain (2,026 m) is named Rochers des Rayes.
