= Pierre-Marie Taramarcaz =

Personal information
- Born: 23 April 1968 (age 58) Martigny VS, Switzerland

Sport
- Sport: Skiing

Pierre-Marie Taramarcaz (born 23 April 1968) from Verbier is a Swiss ski mountaineer.

Taramarcaz was born in Martigny VS and has been member of the national team since 1998.

== Selected results ==
- 1996:
  - 1st, Patrouille de la Maya A-course, together with Daniel Hediger and Laurent Perruchoud
- 2000:
  - 1st, Patrouille de la Maya A-course, together with Jean-Yves Rey and Jean-Daniel Masserey
- 2001:
  - 2nd, Swiss Cup, scratch (and 1st seniors)
- 2002:
  - 6th, World Championship single race
- 2003:
  - 2nd, Trophée des Gastlosen, together with Pius Schuwey
  - 5th, European Championship single race
  - 5th, European Championship team race (together with Alexander Hug)
  - 7th, European Championship combination ranking
- 2004:
  - 1st, Patrouille de la Maya A-course, together with Jean-Yves Rey and Sébastien Epiney
  - 1st, Trophée des Gastlosen, together with Florent Troillet
  - 8th, World Championship combination ranking
  - 9th, World Championship single race
  - 10th, World Championship team race (together with Florent Troillet)
- 2006:
  - 10th, World Championship team race (together with Didier Moret)
- 2009:
  - 2nd, Trophée des Gastlosen, together with Jean-Yves Rey

=== Pierra Menta ===
- 2001: 7th, together with Jean-François Cuennet
- 2005: 6th, together with Christian Pittex

=== Patrouille des Glaciers ===
- 2000: 2nd (and 1st in "seniors I" class ranking), together with Jean-Yves Rey and Jean-Daniel Masserey
- 2004: 2nd, together with Jean-Yves Rey and Jean-Daniel Masserey
- 2008: 2nd, together with Jean-Yves Rey and Jean-Daniel Masserey
