= Florent Troillet =

Swiss ski mountaineer (born 1981)

Personal information
- Born: 7 June 1981 (age 45) Lourtier, Switzerland

Sport
- Sport: Skiing
Medal record
Ski mountaineering
Representing Switzerland
World Championships
Gold medal – first place	2010 World Championship	Single
Silver medal – second place	2008 World Championship	Single
Silver medal – second place	2008 World Championship	Relay
Silver medal – second place	2010 World Championship	Team
Silver medal – second place	2010 World Championship	Relay
Bronze medal – third place	2006 World Championship	Relay
European Championships
Bronze medal – third place	2009 European Championship	Relay

Florent Troillet (born 7 June 1981) is a Swiss ski mountaineer.

Troillet was born in Lourtier. He competed first in 1995. He has been member of the national team since 1996 and member of the Dynafit team since 2003. In 2007, in a team with Simon Anthamatten (leader), Ernest Farquet and Marcel Marti, he climbed the Matterhorn via the Swiss side in a record time of 3 hours 45 minutes. The record was beaten by Andreas Steindl in 2011.

His sister Marie is also a competition ski mountaineer.

== Selected results ==
- 2004:
  - 1st, Trophée des Gastlosen, together with Pierre-Marie Taramarcaz
  - 1st, World Championship ("cadetts" and "juniors")
  - 2nd, World Championship ("juniors")
  - 10th, World Championship team race ("seniors" ranking; together with Pierre-Marie Taramarcaz)
- 2005:
  - 6th, World Cup team (together with Alexander Hug)
  - 10th, World Cup race, Salt Lake City
- 2006:
  - 1st, Swiss Championship single race
  - 3rd, Trophée des Gastlosen, together with Yannick Ecoeur
  - 3rd, World Championship relay race (together with Alexander Hug, Alain Rey and Rico Elmer)
  - 3rd, European Cup team (together with Rico Elmer), Albosaggia
- 2007:
  - 1st, Dachstein Xtreme race
  - 3rd, World Cup single
  - 5th, European Championship team race (together with Alexander Hug)
  - 5th, European Championship single
  - 7th, European Championship combination ranking
- 2008:
  - 2nd, World Championship single race
  - 2nd, World Championship relay race (together with Pierre Bruchez, Martin Anthamatten and Didier Moret)
  - 2nd, World Cup race, Val d'Aran
  - 4th, World Championship long distance race
  - 8th, World Championship vertical race
  - 9th, World Championship combination ranking
  - 1st, Trophée des Gastlosen, together with Alexander Hug
- 2009:
  - 1st, Valtellina Orobie World Cup race
  - 3rd, European Championship relay race (together with Marcel Marti, Pierre Bruchez and Yannick Ecoeur)
  - 8th, European Championship single race
- 2010:
  - 1st, World Championship single race
  - 2nd, World Championship team race (together with Martin Anthamatten)
  - 2nd, World Championship relay race (together with Martin Anthamatten, Yannick Ecoeur and Pierre Bruchez)
  - 4th, World Championship single race
  - 4th, World Championship combination ranking
  - 8th, World Championship vertical race
  - 3rd, Trophée des Gastlosen (ISMF World Cup), together with Martin Anthamatten
- 2012:
  - 1st, Zermatt-Rothorn run
  - 2nd, Sellaronda Skimarathon (together with Pietro Lanfranchi)
  - 2nd, Patrouille de la Maya, together with Martin Anthamatten and Yannick Ecoeur

=== Trofeo Mezzalama ===
- 2003: 6th, together with Christian Pittex and Didier Moret
- 2005: 2nd, together with Alexander Hug and Christian Pittex
- 2007: 1st, together with Guido Giacomelli and Jean Pellissier

=== Pierra Menta ===
- 2006: 3rd, together with Rico Elmer
- 2008: 1st, together with Kílian Jornet Burgada
- 2009: 5th, together with Marcel Marti
- 2010: 1st, together with Kílian Jornet Burgada

=== Patrouille des Glaciers ===
- 2004: 4th, together with Christian Pittex and Alexander Hug
- 2006: 3rd (and 1st in international military teams ranking), together with Cpl Rico Elmer and Pvt E-2 Yannick Ecoeur
- 2008: 1st, together with Didier Moret and Alexander Hug
- 2010: 1st, together with Martin Anthamatten and Yannick Ecoeur
