= Emmanuel Vaudan =

Swiss ski mountaineer and long-distance runner

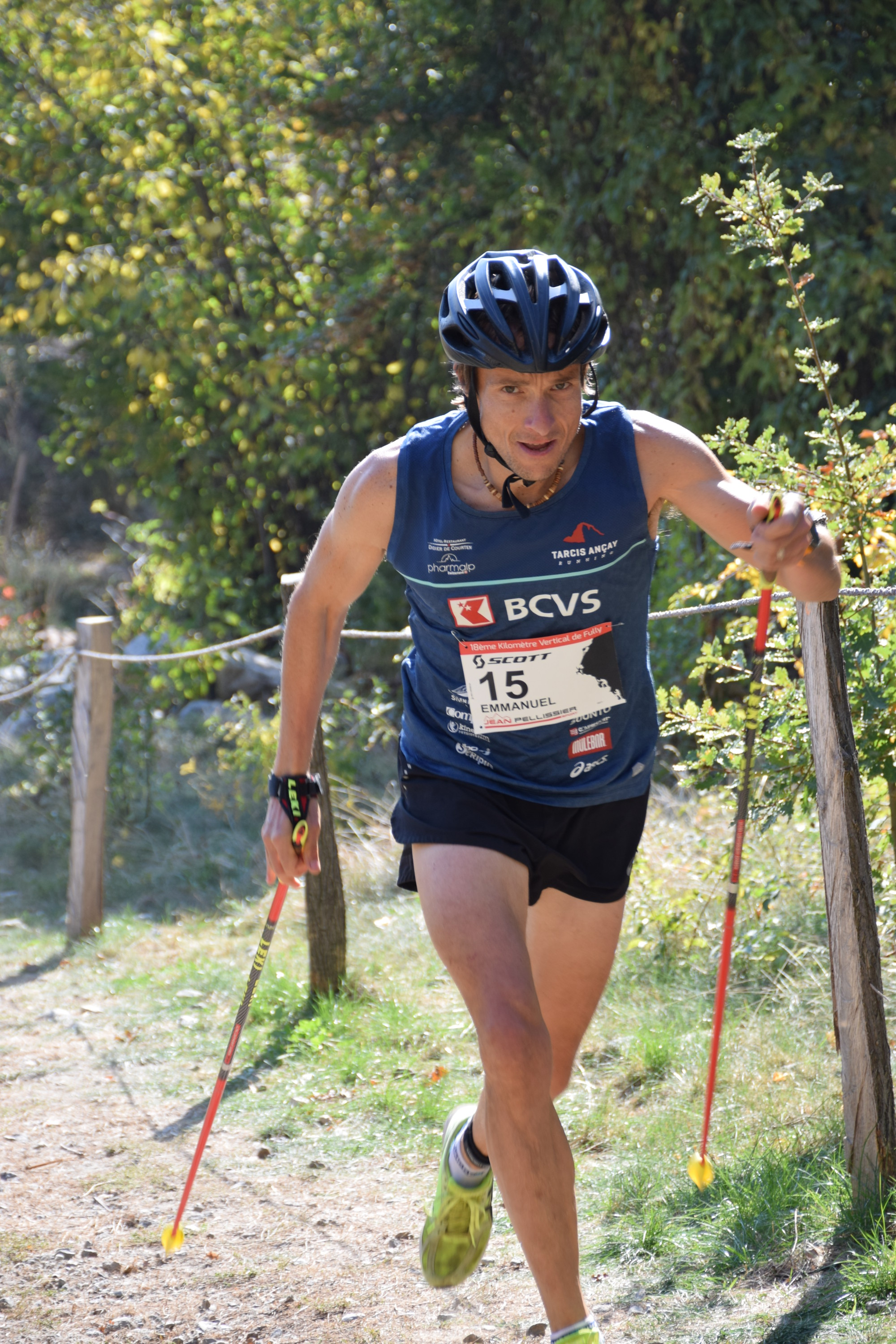
- Vaudan in 2018

Personal information
- Born: 21 December 1971 (age 54)

Sport
- Sport: Skiing

Emmanuel Vaudan (born 21 December 1971) from Monthey is a Swiss ski mountaineer and long-distance runner.

== Selected results ==
=== Ski mountaineering ===
- 2001:
  - 3rd, Swiss Cup, scratch (and 2nd seniors)
- 2002:
  - 2nd, Trophée de la Tête de Balme team race (together with Pierre-Marie Taramarcaz)
  - 2nd, Diamir-Race, Diemtig valley (together with Christian Pittex)
  - 2nd, Trophée du Muveran (together with Christian Pittex)
  - 3rd, Suisse Cup
- 2005:
  - 5th, European Championship vertical race
  - 10th, European Championship team race (together with Yannick Ecoeur)
- 2008:
  - 2nd, Kilomètre Vertical de Fully race
- 2011:
  - 1st, Zermatt-Rothorn mountain run

==== Patrouille des Glaciers ====
- 2004: 5th, together with Pius Schuwey and Didier Moret
- 2006: 5th (and 3rd in "senior I" class ranking), together with Alain Rey and Marcel Marti

=== Running ===
- 2003:
  - 1st, Jeizibärg-Lauf, Gampel
- 2004:
  - 3rd (men II), Jeizibärg-Lauf, Gampel
- 2005:
  - 1st (men II), Jeizibärg-Lauf, Gampel
  - 1st, Jeizibärg-Lauf & Dérupe Vercorin Trophy
  - 1st, half marathon within the Mystery Inferno
- 2006:
  - 1st, Jeizibärg-Lauf & Dérupe Vercorin Trophy
  - 2nd, Jeizibärg-Lauf, Gampel
  - 3rd, half marathon within the Mystery Inferno
- 2007:
  - 1st, Jeizibärg-Lauf, Gampel
  - 1st, half marathon within the AlpenMarathon – Marathon des Alpages
- 2008:
  - 3rd, Dérupe Vercorin
- 2010:
  - 3rd, Jeizibärg-Lauf / Mountain Running Cup, Gampel
- 2011:
  - 1st, Trail Verbier-St Bernard - "La Traversée", 61 km
- 2011:
  - 1st, and overall record, climbing 1723 m altitude in 55 minutes 55 seconds
