= Sébastien Epiney =

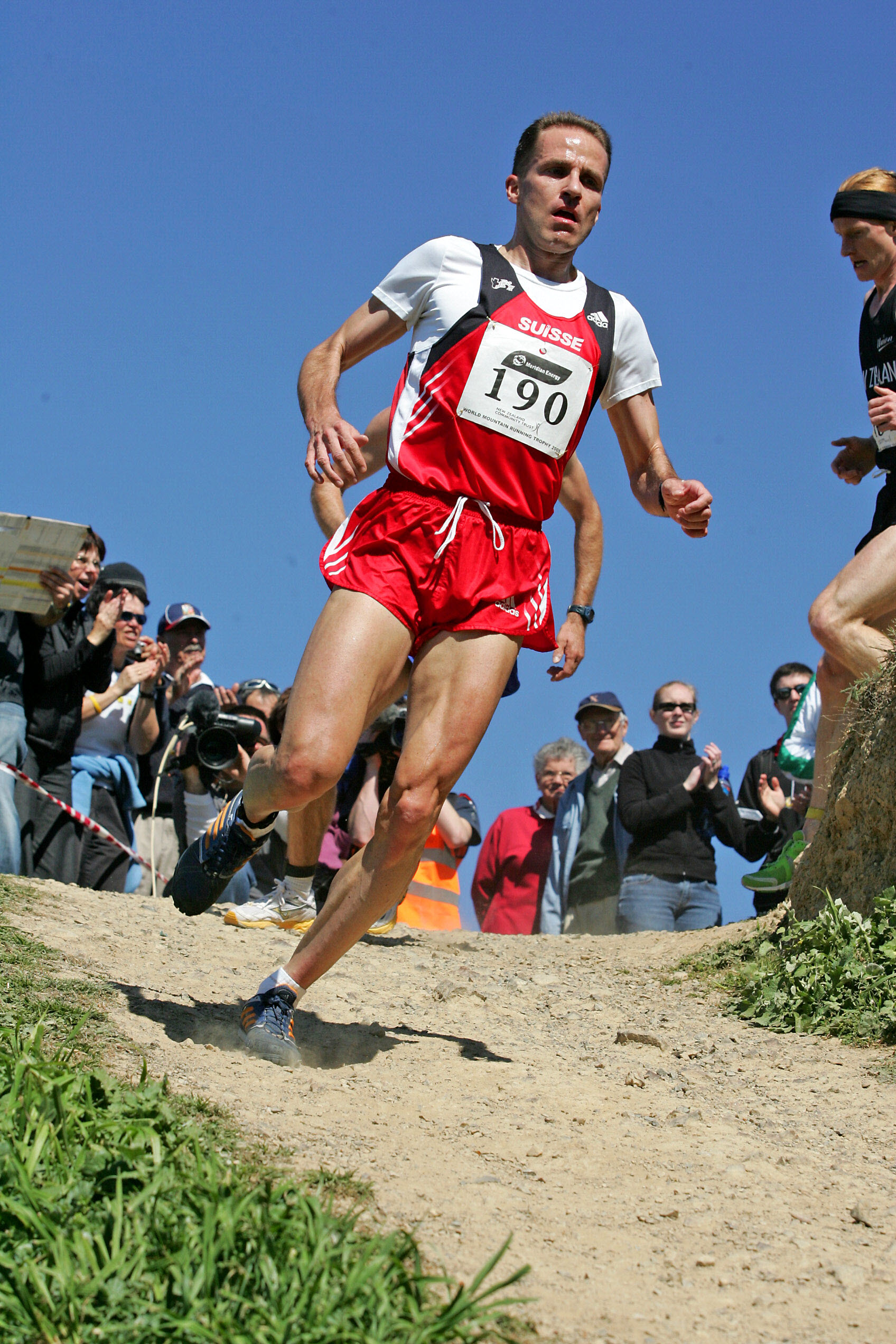
- Sébastien Epiney at 2005 World Mountain Running Trophy

Personal information
- Born: 29 August 1967 (age 58) Paris

Sport
- Sport: Skiing
Medal record
Ski mountaineering
Representing Switzerland
World Championships
Bronze medal – third place	2004 World Championship	Vertical race

Sébastien Epiney (born 29 August 1967 in Paris) is a Swiss ski mountaineer and long distance runner. Epiney started ski mountaineering in 2001.

== Selected results ==
=== Ski mountaineering ===
- 2004:
  - 1st, Patrouille de la Maya A-course, together with Jean-Daniel Masserey and Jean-Yves Rey
  - 3rd, Trophée des Gastlosen, together with Pius Schuwey
  - 3rd, World Championship vertical race
  - 4th, World Championship team race (together with Jean-Yves Rey)
- 2005:
  - 1st, Swiss Championship
- 2006:
  - 5th, World Championship vertical race
  - 2nd, Trophée des Gastlosen, together with Didier Moret
- 2007:
  - 4th, European Championship vertical race
- 2008:
  - 1st, Swiss Championship
  - 7th, World Championship vertical race
- 2009:
  - 10th, European Championship vertical race
- 2010:
  - 1st, Zermatt-Rothorn run

=== Mountain running ===
- 2004: 3rd, Matterhorn run
- 2005: 1st, Matterhorn run
- 2008: 1st (veterans 1) and course record, Jeizibärg-Lauf, Gampel
