= Pius Schuwey =

Swiss ski mountaineer (1970–2020)

Pius Schuwey (1970–2020) was a Swiss ski mountaineer from Jaun.

== Selected results ==
- 1999:
  - 5th, Pierra Menta (together with Heinz Blatter)
- 2002:
  - 1st, Swiss Cup
  - 3rd, European Cup race, Gros Roig
  - 3rd, Trophée des Gastlosen (together with Laurent Gremaud)
  - 7th, World Championshipg team race (together with Alexander Hug)
- 2003:
  - 2nd, Trophée des Gastlosen (together with Pierre-Marie Taramarcaz)
- 2004:
  - 1st, Zermatt-Rothorn run
  - 3rd, Trophée des Gastlosen, together with Sébastien Epiney
- 2006:
  - 1st, Zermatt-Rothorn run
  - 4th, Swiss Championship vertical race
- 2008:
  - 1st and course record, Zermatt-Rothorn run
- 2009:
  - 1st, Montée nocturne de la Berra
  - 2nd, L'Américaine de Chia race (together with Eric Charriere)

=== Patrouille des Glaciers ===
- 1998: 4th "seniors II" ranking, together with François Bussard and Daniel Thurler
- 2000: 4th (and 1st "seniors II" ranking), together with Jean-François Cuennet and Eric Seydoux
- 2004: 5th, together with Emmanuel Vaudan and Didier Moret
- 2006: 4th (and 2nd international military teams ranking), together with Cpl Ernest Farquet and Cpl Stéphane Gay
