= Alexander Hug (ski mountaineer) =

Swiss ski mountaineer (born 1975)

Personal information
- Born: 11 May 1975 (age 51) Walenstadt, Switzerland

Sport
- Sport: Skiing
Medal record
Ski mountaineering
Representing Switzerland
World Championships
Bronze medal – third place	2004 World Championship	Relay
Bronze medal – third place	2006 World Championship	Relay
European Championships
Silver medal – second place	2005 European Championship	Relay
Bronze medal – third place	2005 European Championship	Single

Alexander Hug (born 11 May 1975) is a Swiss ski mountaineer.

== Biography ==
Hug was born in Walenstadt and used for his first ski mountaineering attempts on the Garmil years self-tinkered touring bindings, when he was eleven years old. He started armateur ski mountaineering sports in 1990 and competed first at the "Arflina race". In 1999 and 2000 he won the "Pizol Challenge", and has been member of the national team since 2000. He enjoys also mountain biking, climbing and mountain running. Together with Beat Good and Andreas Zimmermann he created the "Pizol Altiski", which he organized in 2003. In autumn of 2005 he was trained as a landscape gardener in London. He currently works at Golf Club Bad Ragaz. He lives in Sargans.

== Selected results ==
- 2002:
  - 7th, World Championship single race
  - 7th, World Championship team race (together with Pius Schuwey)
  - 8th, World Championship combination ranking
- 2003:
  - 5th, European Championship team race (together with Pierre-Marie Taramarcaz)
  - 10th, European Championship combination ranking
- 2004:
  - 3rd, World Championship relay race (together with Rico Elmer, Alain Richard and Pierre Bruchez)
  - 5th, World Championship (together with Christian Pittex)
- 2005:
  - 1st, Swiss Championship single
  - 2nd, European Championship relay race (together with Christian Pittex, Jean-Yves Rey and Yannick Ecoeur)
  - 3rd, European Championship single race
  - 4th, European Championship vertical race
  - 4th, World Cup race, Salt Lake City
  - 6th, World Cup team (together with Florent Troillet)
- 2006:
  - 1st, Swiss Championship vertical race
  - 2nd, Adamello Ski Raid (together with Christian Pittex and Didier Moret)
  - 3rd, World Championship relay race (together with Alain Rey, Rico Elmer and Florent Troillet)
  - 4th, World Championship team race (together with Rico Elmer)
- 2007:
  - 5th, European Championship team race (together with Florent Troillet)
  - 9th European Championship combination ranking
- 2008:
  - 1st, Trophée des Gastlosen, together with Florent Troillet

=== Pierra Menta ===
- 2001: 10th, together with Olivier Nägele
- 2007: 6th, together with Alain Rey

=== Trofeo Mezzalama ===
- 2001: 8th, together with Olivier Nägele and Nicolao Leone Lanfranchi
- 2005: 2nd, together with Florent Troillet and Christian Pittex
- 2011: 8th, together with Marcel Theux and Didier Moret

=== Patrouille des Glaciers ===
- 2000: 6th (and 2nd international military teams ranking), together with Pvt E-2 Laurent Perruchoud and Pvt E-2 Daniel Hediger
- 2004: 4th, together with Florent Troillet and Christian Pittex
- 2006: 2nd, together with Didier Moret and Christian Pittex
- 2008: 1st, together with Florent Troillet and Didier Moret
