= Farquet =

Farquet may refer to:

- Damien Farquet (b. 1971), Swiss ski mountaineer and cross-country skier
- Ernest Farquet (b. 1975), Swiss ski mountaineer
