= Rolf Zurbrügg =

Rolf Zurbrügg (born 1971) is a Swiss ski mountaineer and national ski-mountaineering coach. He is also a cross-country skier and a trained mountain guide.

Zurbrügg was born in Adelboden. Professionally he is deployed in the Border Guard Corps and works at the border station of Brig. By order of the Swiss Alpine Club he has coached the national ski mountaineering team since November 2005.

== Selected results ==
Zurbrügg won several Swiss Cup races.

- 2002: 1st, Patrouille de la Maya A-course, together with Damien Farquet and Rico Elmer
- 2003: 1st, Trofeo Mezzalama, together with Damien Farquet and Rico Elmer
- 2004: 2nd, Zermatt-Rothorn run

=== Patrouille des Glaciers ===
- 2000: 5th (international military teams ranking), together with Pvt E-2 Ernest Farquet and Pvt E-2 Gregoire Saillen
- 2004: 3rd, together with Damien Farquet and Rico Elmer
