= Jean-Daniel Masserey =

Swiss ski mountaineer (born 1972)

Personal information
- Born: February 27, 1972 (age 54)

Sport
- Sport: Skiing

Jean-Daniel Masserey (born February 27, 1972) is a Swiss ski mountaineer.

== Selected results ==
- 1998:
  - 1st, Patrouille de la Maya A-course, together with Gabriel Besson and Jean-Yves Rey
- 1999:
  - 7th, Pierra Menta (together with Jean-Yves Rey)
- 2000:
  - 1st, Patrouille de la Maya A-course, together with Pierre-Marie Taramarcaz and Jean-Yves Rey
- 2003:
  - 6th, European Championship team race (together with Jean-Yves Rey)
- 2004:
  - 1st, Patrouille de la Maya A-course, together with Sébastien Epiney and Jean-Yves Rey
  - 2nd, Trophée des Gastlosen, together with Jean-Yves Rey
- 2005:
  - 7th, European Championship team race (together with Jean-Yves Rey)
- 2004:
  - 1st, Patrouille de la Maya A-course, together with Pierre-Marie Taramarcaz and Jean-Yves Rey

=== Patrouille des Glaciers ===
- 1998: 3rd (international military teams ranking), together with Jean-Yves Rey and Gabriel Besson
- 2000: 2nd (and 1st in "seniors I" class ranking), together with Jean-Yves Rey and Pierre-Marie Taramarcaz
- 2004: 2nd, together with Pierre-Marie Taramarcaz and Jean-Yves Rey
- 2008: 2nd, together with Pierre-Marie Taramarcaz and Jean-Yves Rey
- 2010: 3rd, together with Rico Elmer and Jean-Yves Rey
