= Bruchez =

Bruchez may refer to:

- Jules Bruchez American professional mixed martial arts (MMA) fighter
- Pierre Bruchez (b. 1985) is a Swiss ski mountaineer
