= Ernest Farquet =

Swiss ski mountaineer

Personal information
- Born: 28 November 1975 (age 50)

Sport
- Sport: Skiing

Ernest Farquet (born 28 November 1975) is a Swiss ski mountaineer.

== History ==
In 2007, in a team with Simon Anthamatten (leader), Marcel Marti and Florent Troillet, he climbed the Matterhorn in a record time of 3 hours 45 minutes. The record was beaten by Andreas Steindl in 2011.

== Selected results ==
- 2006:
  - 3rt, Zermatt-Rothorn run
- 2008:
  - 3rd, Trophée des Gastlosen, together with Jon Andri Willy
  - 8th, Pierra Menta (together with Marcel Marti)
- 2009:
  - 9th, European Championship team race (together with Reynold Ginier)

=== Patrouille des Glaciers ===
- 2000: 5th (international military teams ranking), together with Pvt E-2 Rolf Zurbrügg and Pvt E-2 Gregoire Saillen
- 2004: 6th (and 1st international military teams ranking), together with Cpl Dominique Di Nino and Cpl Stéphane Gay
- 2006: 4th (and 2nd in international military teams ranking), together with Cpl Stéphane Gay and Pvt E-2 Pius Schuwey
- 2008: 3rd, together with Jon Andri Willy and Martin Anthamatten
- 2010: 2nd ("military international" class ranking), together with Thomas Delamorclaz and Antoine Jean

=== Trofeo Mezzalama ===
- 2005: 7th: together with Stephane Millius and Philippe Blanc
- 2007: 8th, together with Yannick Ecoeur and Alain Rey
- 2009: 5th, together with Didier Moret and Pierre Bruchez
