= Gastlosen =

Coordinates: 46.5841°N 7.2814°E

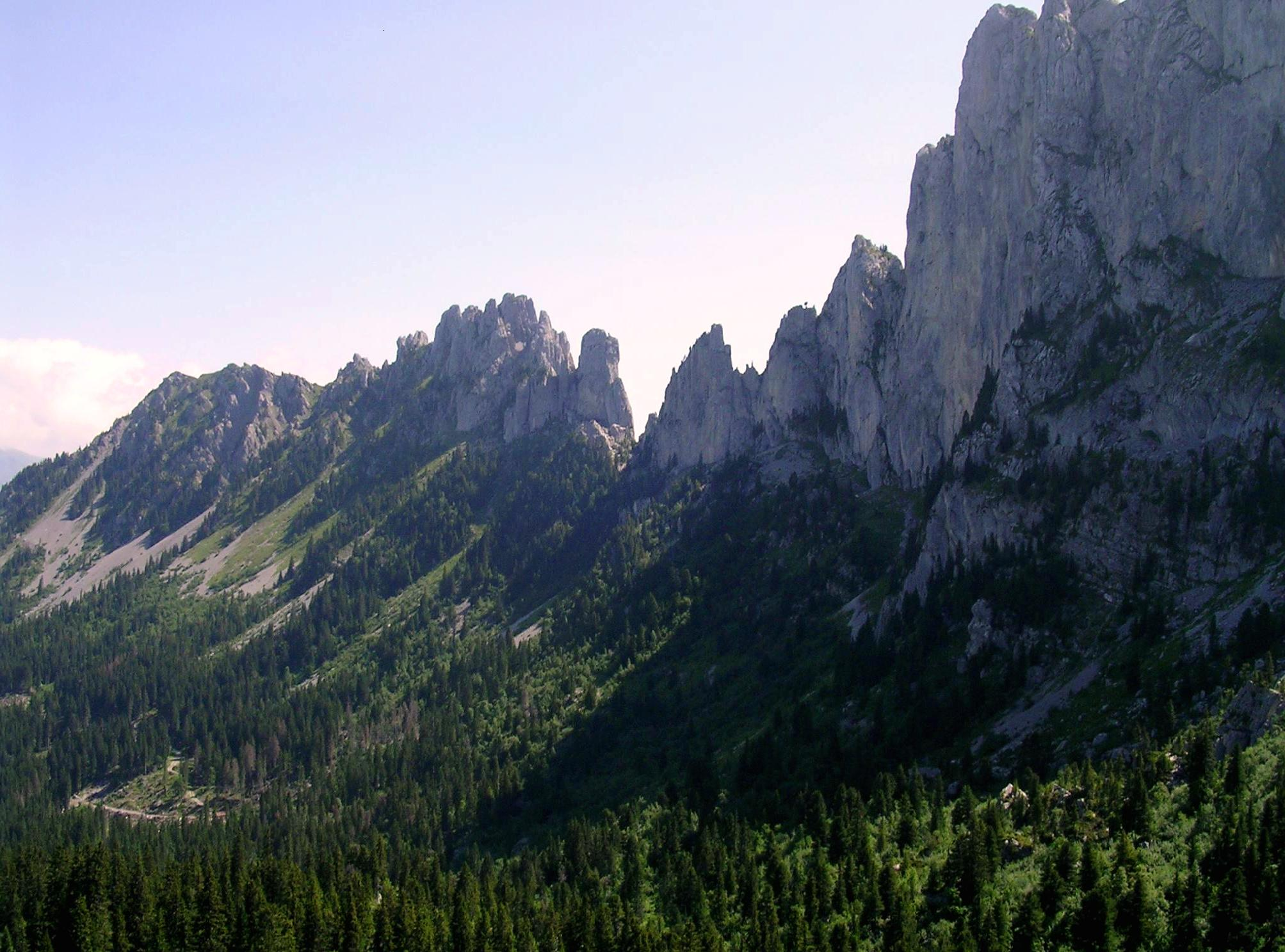
View of the northern end from the west side (near Jaun)

The Gastlosen (local Arpitan: Lè Gachtiyè [le ɡaʃˈtije]) are a mountain range of the Swiss Prealps, lying between the cantons of Fribourg, Bern and Vaud. They form a 12 km (7.5 mi) chain stretching from Jaun to Rougemont, culminating at the Dent de Savigny, elevation 2,252 m (7,388 ft), just south-west of the Dent de Ruth, where the three cantonal borders meet.

The Trophée des Gastlosen is a competition of ski mountaineering which takes place in the area.
