= Alain Richard (ski mountaineer) =

Swiss ski mountaineer (born 1985)

Personal information
- Born: 1 May 1985 (age 41)

Sport
- Sport: Skiing
Medal record
Ski mountaineering
Representing Switzerland
World Championships
Bronze medal – third place	2004 World Championship	Relay

Alain Richard (born 1 May 1985) is a Swiss ski mountaineer.

== Selected results ==
- 2002:
  - 1st, Patrouille de la Maya B-course, together with Marcel Marti and William Marti
- 2003:
  - 1st (juniors), Trophée des Gastlosen, together with Marcel Marti
- 2004:
  - 1st, Trophée des Gastlosen, together with Pierre Bruchez
  - 3rd, World Championship relay race (together with Alexander Hug, Pierre Bruchez and Rico Elmer)
- 2005:
  - 1st (espoirs), Trophée des Gastlosen, together with Pierre Bruchez
- 2006:
  - 6th "senior I" class ranking, Patrouille des Glaciers (together with Mathieu Charvoz and Pierre Bruchez)
