= Jean-Yves Rey =

Swiss ski mountaineer and long-distance runner

Personal information
- Born: November 24, 1970 (age 55) Sierre, Switzerland

Sport
- Sport: Skiing
Medal record
Ski mountaineering
Silver medal – second place	2005 European Championship	Relay
Silver medal – second place	2008 World Championship	Long distance

Jean-Yves Rey (born November 24, 1970) is a Swiss ski mountaineer and long-distance runner.

Rey was born in Sierre. He started ski mountaineering in 1990, competing first in the Patrouille des Glaciers short-distance race. He was a member of the national team from 1999 to 2006.

== Selected results ==
=== Ski mountaineering ===
- 1998:
  - 1st, Patrouille de la Maya A-course, together with Gabriel Besson and Jean-Daniel Masserey
- 1999:
  - 7th, Pierra Menta, together with Jean-Daniel Masserey
- 2000:
  - 1st, Patrouille de la Maya A-course, together with Pierre-Marie Taramarcaz and Jean-Daniel Masserey
- 2003:
  - 6th, European Championship team race (together with Jean-Daniel Masserey)
- 2004:
  - 1st, Patrouille de la Maya A-course, together with Sébastien Epiney and Jean-Daniel Masserey
  - 2nd, Trophée des Gastlosen, together with Jean-Daniel Masserey
  - 4th, World Championship team race (together with Sébastien Epiney)
  - 9th, World Championship vertical race
- 2005:
  - 2nd, European Championship relay race (together with Alexander Hug, Christian Pittex and Yannick Ecoeur)
  - 7th, European Championship single race
  - 7th, European Championship team race (together with Jean-Daniel Masserey)
- 2008:
  - 1st, Patrouille de la Maya A-course, together with Pierre-Marie Taramarcaz and Jean-Daniel Masserey
- 2009:
  - 2nd, Trophée des Gastlosen, together with Pierre-Marie Taramarcaz

==== Patrouille des Glaciers ====
- 1998: 3rd (international military teams ranking), together with Jean-Daniel Masserey and Gabriel Besson
- 2000: 2nd (and 1st in "seniors I" class ranking), together with Pierre-Marie Taramarcaz and Jean-Daniel Masserey
- 2002: 2nd, together with Pierre-Marie Taramarcaz and Jean-Daniel Masserey
- 2004: 2nd, together with Pierre-Marie Taramarcaz and Jean-Daniel Masserey
- 2008: 2nd, together with Pierre-Marie Taramarcaz and Jean-Daniel Masserey
- 2010: 3rd, together with Jean-Daniel Masserey and Rico Elmer

=== Running ===
- 2001: 3rd, Jeizibärg-Lauf, Gampel
- 2003: 3rd, Jeizibärg-Lauf, Gampel

Rey won the Zermatt marathon in 2004, the Mont-Blanc marathon in 2008, as well as three times in a row the AlpenMarathon – Marathon des Alpages, where he has held the course record with a total time of 3:07:18 hours since 2005.
