= Andreas Steindl =

Swiss mountain climber, ski mountaineer and mountain guide

Personal information
- Born: 8 April 1989 (age 37) Zermatt, Switzerland

Sport
- Sport: Skiing

Andreas Steindl (born 8 April 1989) is a Swiss mountain climber, ski mountaineer and mountain guide.

Steindl was born in Zermatt, where he worked as a carpenter before he earned his mountain guide diploma in 2011. He also competes in alpine skiing and mountain running events.

== Selected results ==
=== Mountaineering ===
On 23 August 2011 he climbed the Matterhorn in a record time of 2 hours 57 minutes, and beat the record of Simon Anthamatten, Ernest Farquet, Marcel Marti and Florent Troillet from 2007. The team of 2007 mounted the Matterhorn in a time of 3 hours 45 minutes. In 2018, he ran from Kirchplatz in Zermatt to the summit of the Matterhorn and back in 3:59:52 improving on his own previous record by 20 minutes.

=== Ski mountaineering ===
- 2011:
  - 4th, Zermatt-Rothorn mountain run
- 2012:
  - 6th, European Championship, sprint
    Steindl also competed in the espoir class at the European Championship, and won Bronze in the youth sprint event.

=== Running ===
- 2011: 3rd (juniors), Matterhorn run
