= Rico Elmer =

Swiss ski mountaineer and mountain runner

Personal information
- Born: 23 July 1969 (age 56) Elm, Glarus, Switzerland

Sport
- Sport: Skiing
Medal record
Ski mountaineering
Representing Switzerland
World Championships
Gold medal – first place	2004 World Championship	Single
Bronze medal – third place	2004 World Championship	Relay
Bronze medal – third place	2006 World Championship	Relay
European Championships
Gold medal – first place	2003 European Championship	Team

Rico Elmer (born 23 July 1969) is a Swiss ski mountaineer and mountain runner.

Elmer was born in village of Elm in the canton of Glarus. He first competed in the Patrouille des Glaciers event in 1996 and has been member of the national team since 2003. Professionally he is deployed in the Border Guard Corps.

== Selected results ==
- 2000:
  - 1st and course record, Tour de Matterhorn (together with Emanuel Buchs and Damien Farquet)
- 2002:
  - 1st, Patrouille de la Maya A-course, together with Damien Farquet and Rolf Zurbrügg
- 2003:
  - 1st, Trophée des Gastlosen, together with Damien Farquet
  - 1st, European Championship team race (together with Damien Farquet)
  - 3rd, European Championship combination ranking
  - 4th, European Championship single race
- 2004:
  - 1st, World Championship single race
  - 3rd, World Championship relay race (together with Alexander Hug, Alain Richard and Pierre Bruchez)
  - 3rd, Transcavallo race (together with Damien Farquet)
- 2006:
  - 3rd, World Championship relay race (together with Alexander Hug, Alain Rey and Florent Troillet)
  - 3rd, European Cup race in Albosaggia (together with Florent Troillet)
  - 3rd, Swiss Championship vertical race
  - 4th, World Championship team race (together with Alexander Hug)

=== Patrouille des Glaciers ===
- 1998: 1st, together with Pvt E-2 Damien Farquet and Pvt E-2 Emanuel Buchs
- 2000: 1st and course record, together with Pvt E-2 Damien Farquet and Pvt E-2 Emanuel Buchs
- 2004: 3rd, together with Damien Farquet and Rolf Zurbrügg
- 2006: 3rd (and 1st in international military teams ranking), together with Pvt E-2 Florent Troillet and Pvt E-2 Yannick Ecoeur
- 2008: 5th ("seniors I" class ranking), mixed team together with Sophie Dusautoir Bertrand and Marie Troillet
- 2010: 3rd, together with Jean-Daniel Masserey and Jean-Yves Rey

=== Trofeo Mezzalama ===
- 2001: 4th, together with Damien Farquet and Emanuel Buchs
- 2003: 1st, together with Damien Farquet and Rolf Zurbrügg

=== Pierra Menta ===
- 2003: 6th, together with Damien Farquet
