= Jean-François Cuennet =

Swiss ski mountaineer

Jean-François Cuennet (born 1961) from Bulle FR is a Swiss ski mountaineer, long-distance runner and mountain biker. He was coach of the Swiss national ski mountaineering team from 2002 to 2005.

Cuennet competed in mountain running and marathon events in his teens. Before he became national coach, he competed as a member of the Swiss national ski mountaineering team from 1999 to 2001.

== Selected results ==
- 2001:
  - 1st, Swiss Cup, scratch
  - 2nd, Trophée des Gastlosen (European Cup, together with Heinz Blatter)
  - 7th, Pierra Menta (together with Pierre-Marie Taramarcaz)

=== Patrouille des Glaciers ===
- 2000: 4th (and 1st in "seniors II" ranking), together with Pius Schuwey and Eric Seydoux
- 2008: 6th ("seniors II" class ranking), together with Benoît Jaquet and Christian Pittex
- 2010: 4th ("seniors III" class ranking), together with Benoît Jaquet and François Oberson
