= Cimo =

Cimo or CIMO may refer to:

- Cimo (company), a chemical company based in Monthey in the Swiss canton of Valais
- Cimo (Ticino), a former municipality in the Swiss canton of Ticino
- CIMO-FM, a French-language radio station located in the Canadian province of Quebec
