= Marcel Marti (ski mountaineer) =

Swiss ski mountaineer (born 1983)

Personal information
- Born: 8 November 1983 (age 42) Interlaken, Switzerland

Sport
- Sport: Skiing
Medal record
Ski mountaineering
Representing Switzerland
World Championships
Silver medal – second place	2011 World Championship	Relay
European Championships
Bronze medal – third place	2009 European Championship	Relay
Bronze medal – third place	2012 European Championship	Sprint

Marcel Marti (born 8 November 1983) is a Swiss ski mountaineer.

Marti was born in Interlaken. He competed first in the Diamir Race in 1998. He lives in Grindelwald. In 2007, in a team with Simon Anthamatten (leader), Ernest Farquet and Florent Troillet, he climbed the Matterhorn in a record time of 3 hours 45 minutes. The record was beaten by Andreas Steindl in 2011.

== Selected results ==
- 2002:
  - 1st, Patrouille de la Maya B-course, together with Alain Richard and William Marti
- 2003:
  - 1st (juniors), Trophée des Gastlosen, together with Alain Richard
- 2004:
  - 1st (espoirs), Trophée des Gastlosen, together with Sébastien Nicollier
- 2006:
  - 1st, Trophée des Gastlosen, together with Olivier Nägele
- 2008:
  - 8th, World Championship team race (together with Jon Andri Willy)
- 2009:
  - 3rd, European Championship relay race (together with Florent Troillet, Yannick Ecoeur and Pierre Bruchez)
  - 7th, European Championship single race
  - 7th, European Championship team race together with Yannick Ecoeur)
- 2010:
  - 9th, World Championship team race (together with Yannick Ecoeur)
- 2011:
  - 2nd, World Championship relay, together with Yannick Ecoeur, Marcel Theux and Martin Anthamatten
  - 6th, World Championship sprint
- 2012:
  - 3rd, European Championship sprint

=== Patrouille des Glaciers ===
- 2006: 5th (and 3rd in "senior I" class ranking), together with Emmanuel Vaudan and Alain Rey
- 2008: 7th (and 1st in the international military teams ranking), together with Cpl Yannick Ecoeur and Garde-frontière Pierre Bruchez
- 2010: 5th, together with Didier Moret and Pierre Bruchez

=== Pierra Menta ===
- 2008: 8th, together with Ernest Farquet
- 2009: 5th, together with Florent Troillet

=== Trofeo Mezzalama ===
- 2009: 6th, together with Martin Anthamatten and Yannick Ecoeur
- 2011: 5th, together with Martin Anthamatten and Yannick Ecoeur
