= Alain Rey (ski mountaineer) =

Swiss ski mountaineer (born 1982)

Personal information
- Born: 7 July 1982 (age 44)

Sport
- Sport: Skiing
Medal record
Ski mountaineering
Representing Switzerland
World Championships
Bronze medal – third place	2006 World Championship	Relay
European Championships
Silver medal – second place	2007 European Championship	Relay

Alain Rey (born 7 July 1982) is a Swiss ski mountaineer.

== Results (selection) ==
- 2005:
  - 9th European Championship vertical race
  - 1st, Trophée des Gastlosen, together with Reynold Ginier
- 2006:
  - 3rd World Championship relay race together with Alexander Hug, Rico Elmer and Florent Troillet
  - 6th World Championship vertical race
  - 9th World Championship team race together with Yannick Ecoeur
- 2007:
  - 2nd European Championship relay race together with Florent Troillet, Yannick Ecoeur and Alexander Hug
  - 6th European Championship team race together wit Yannick Ecoeur
  - 8th, Trofeo Mezzalama (together with Yannick Ecoeur and Ernest Farquet)

=== Patrouille des Glaciers ===
- 2006: 5th (and 3rd in "seniors I" class ranking), together with Emmanuel Vaudan and Marcel Marti
- 2008: 3rd ("seniors I" ranking), together with Sébastien Nicollier and Mathieu Chavoz
- 2010: 9th ("military international" class ranking), together with Sébastien Nicollier and Mathieu Charvoz

=== Pierra Menta ===
- 2006: 8th together with Yannick Ecoeur
- 2007: 6th together with Alexander Hug
