= Wandflue =

Mountain in Switzerland

- Location within Switzerland

Highest point
- Elevation: 2,133 m (6,998 ft)
- Prominence: 173 m (568 ft)
- Parent peak: Dent de Savigny
- Coordinates: 46°33′48.8″N 7°15′36.1″E

Geography
- Location: Fribourg/Bern, Switzerland
- Parent range: Bernese Alps

The Wandflue (also spelled Wandfluh) is a mountain of the Bernese Alps, located on the border between the Swiss cantons of Fribourg and Bern. It lies south of Jaun in the Gastlosen chain.
