= Oberrothorn =

Mountain of the Swiss Pennine Alps

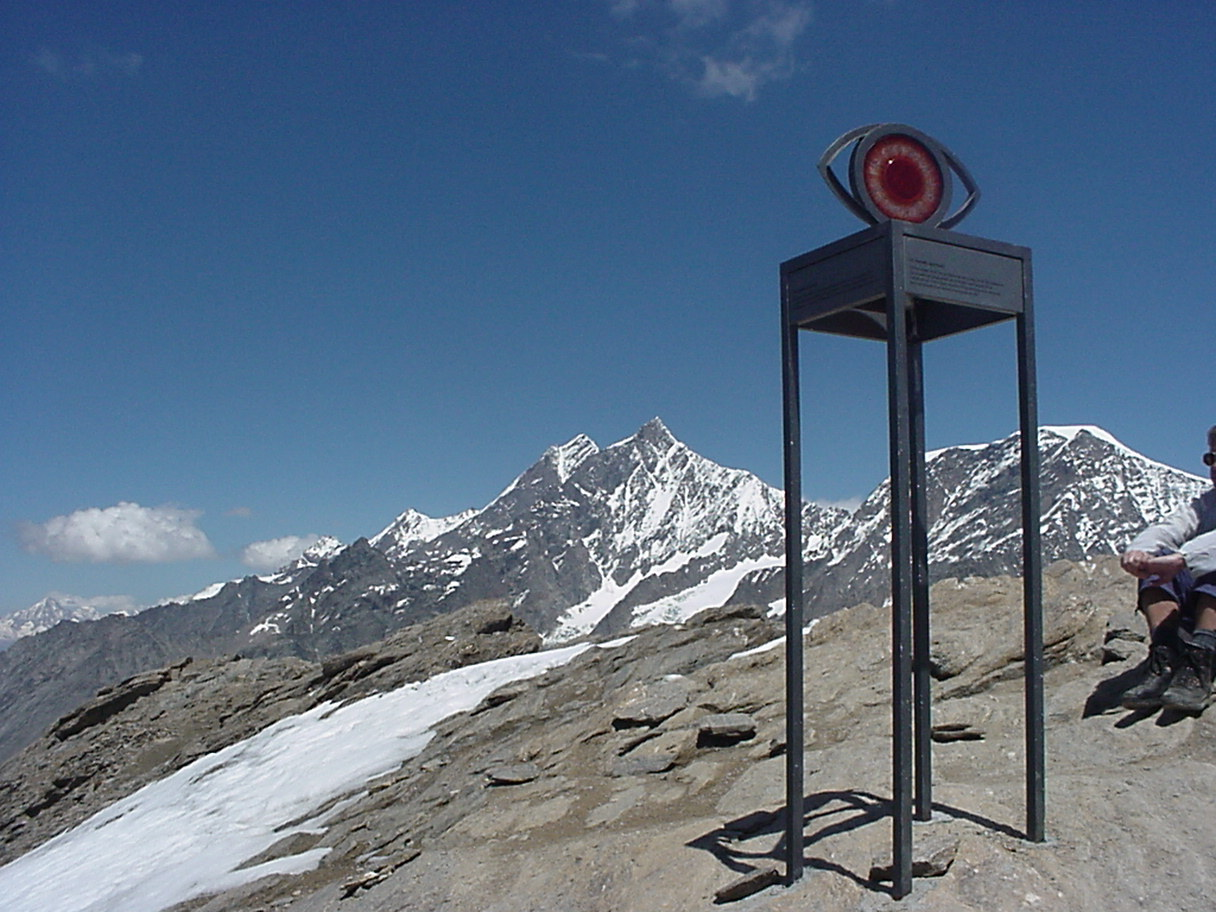
- View of the summit, looking north

Highest point
- Elevation: 3,414 m (11,201 ft)
- Prominence: 259 m (850 ft)
- Parent peak: Monte Rosa
- Coordinates: 46°01′39″N 7°48′46″E

Geography
- Location within Switzerland
- Location: Valais, Switzerland
- Parent range: Pennine Alps

Climbing
- Easiest route: Hike from Unterrothorn

The Oberrothorn (3,414 m) is a mountain of the Swiss Pennine Alps, overlooking Zermatt in the canton of Valais. Its summit can be easily reached via a trail on its southern flank, from the Unterrothorn cable car station or from Sunnegga.

Claims are often made that the Oberrothorn has one of the highest hiking trails in the Alps, or that it's the highest Alpine summit which can be walked up. Such statements are subjective, but do reflect the mountain's unusual accessibility for an Alpine summit of its height.

Due to its location to the east of Zermatt, hikers on the main route up and down the mountain are afforded excellent views of the Matterhorn, across the valley, with the popular Hornli Ridge ascent route being prominent.
