= Didier Moret =

Swiss ski mountaineer (born 1975)

Personal information
- Born: 25 April 1975 (age 51) Riaz, Switzerland

Sport
- Sport: Skiing
Medal record
Ski mountaineering
Representing Switzerland
World Championships
Silver medal – second place	2008 World Championship	Relay
European Championships
Bronze medal – third place	2005 European Championship	Team

Didier Moret (born 25 April 1975) is a Swiss ski mountaineer.

Moret was born in Riaz. He started ski mountaineering in 1996 and competed first in the Trophée de Plain Névé race on the Grand Muveran in the same year. He has been member of the national team since 2003 and enjoys also mountain biking and cross-country skiing.

Moret studied microtechnology at the École Polytechnique Fédérale de Lausanne.

== Selected results ==
- 2003:
  - 1st, Swiss Cup
  - 3rd, Trophée des Gastlosen, together with Laurent Gremaud
  - 10th, European Championship team race (together with Christian Pittex)
- 2004:
  - 1st, Swiss Cup
  - 3rd, Trophée de Muveran
- 2005:
  - 2nd, Swiss Cup
  - 3rd, European Championship team race (together with Christian Pittex)
- 2006:
  - 10th, World Championship team race (together with Pierre-Marie Taramarcaz)
  - 2nd, Swiss Cup
  - 2nd, Adamello Ski Raid (together with Christian Pittex and Alexander Hug)
  - 2nd, Trophée des Gastlosen, together with [[Sébastien EpLaurent Gremaudiney]]
- 2007:
  - 2nd, Swiss Cup
- 2008:
  - 1st, Swiss Cup
  - 2nd, World Championship relay race (together with Pierre Bruchez, Martin Anthamatten and Florent Troillet)
  - 10th, World Championship individual long-distance race
  - 2nd, Trophée des Gastlosen, together with Pierre Bruchez
- 2009:
  - 1st, Swiss Cup
  - 3rd, Trophée des Gastlosen, together with Laurent Gremaud
- 2012:
  - 1st, Trophée des Gastlosen, together with Laurent Gremaud

=== Trofeo Mezzalama ===
- 2003: 6th, together with Christian Pittex and Florent Troillet
- 2005: 5th, together with Stéphane Gay and Yannick Ecoeur
- 2009: 5th, together with Pierre Bruchez and Ernest Farquet
- 2011: 8th, together with Marcel Theux and Alexander Hug

=== Patrouille des Glaciers ===
- 2004: 5th, together with Pius Schuwey and Emmanuel Vaudan
- 2006: 2nd, together with Alexander Hug and Christian Pittex
- 2008: 1st, together with Florent Troillet and Alexander Hug
- 2010: 5th, together with Pierre Bruchez and Marcel Marti
