= Christian Pittex =

Swiss ski mountaineer

Personal information
- Born: 1972 (age 53–54)

Sport
- Sport: Skiing
Medal record
Ski mountaineering
Silver medal – second place	2005 European Championship	Relay
Silver medal – second place	2008 World Championship	Relay
Bronze medal – third place	2005 European Championship	Team

Christian Pittex (born 1972) from La Forclaz is a Swiss ski mountaineer. He was member of the Swiss national team and is deployed in the Border Guard Corps.

== Selected results ==
- 2002:
  - 2nd, Diamir-Race (together with Emmanuel Vaudan), Diemtig valley
  - 2nd, Trophée du Muveran (together with Emmanuel Vaudan)
  - 3rd, "Valerette Altiski 2000"
- 2003:
  - 10th, European Championship team race (together with Didier Moret)
- 2004:
  - 5th, World Championship team race (together with Alexander Hug)
  - 10th, World Championship combination ranking
- 2005:
  - 2nd, European Championship relay race (together with Alexander Hug, Jean-Yves Rey and Yannick Ecoeur)
  - 3rd, European Championship team race (together with Didier Moret)
  - 4th, European Championship single race
  - 8th, World Cup race, Salt Lake City
  - 9th, World Cup team (together with Jean-Yves Rey)
- 2006:
  - 2nd, Adamello Ski Raid (together with Alexander Hug and Didier Moret)

=== Trofeo Mezzalama ===
- 2003: 6th, together with Florent Troillet and Didier Moret
- 2005: 2nd, together with Florent Troillet and Alexander Hug

=== Patrouille des Glaciers ===
- 1998: 5th, together with Alexandre Borghi and Sylvain Gallaz
- 2000: 5th (international military teams ranking), together with Pvt Sylvain Gallaz and Pvt Alexandre Borghi
- 2004: 4th, together with Florent Troillet and Alexander Hug
- 2006: 2nd, together with Didier Moret and Alexander Hug
- 2008: 6th ("seniors II" class ranking), together with Benoît Jaquet and Jean-François Cuennet
- 2010: 3rd ("seniors I" class ranking), together with Grégory Gex-Fabry and Reynold Ginier

=== Pierra Menta ===
- 2005: 6th, together with Pierre-Marie Taramarcaz
