= Damien Farquet =

Swiss ski mountaineer and cross-country skier

Personal information
- Born: 1971 (age 54–55)

Sport
- Sport: Skiing
Medal record
Ski mountaineering
Gold medal – first place	2003 European Championship	Team

Damien Farquet (born 1971) is a Swiss ski mountaineer and cross-country skier. Professionally he is deployed in the Border Guard Corps and lives in Le Châble.

== Selected results ==
- 1994:
  - 1st, Patrouille de la Maya A-course, together with Jean Moix and Michel Cheseaux
- 2000:
  - 1st and course record, Tour de Matterhorn (together with Emanuel Buchs and Rico Elmer)
- 2002:
  - 1st, Patrouille de la Maya A-course, together with Rico Elmer and Rolf Zurbrügg
- 2003:
  - 1st, Trophée des Gastlosen, together with Rico Elmer
  - 1st, European Championship team race (together with Rico Elmer)
  - 5th, European Championship combination ranking
  - 6th Pierra Menta (together with Rico Elmer)
  - 10th, European Championship single race
- 2004:
  - 3rd, Transcavallo race (together with Rico Elmer)

=== Patrouille des Glaciers ===
- 1996, 1st (international military teams ranking), together with Emanuel Buchs and André Rey
- 1998: 1st, together with Pvt E-2 Emanuel Buchs and Pvt E-2 Rico Elmer
- 2000: 1st and course record, together with Pvt E-2 Emanuel Buchs and Pvt E-2 Rico Elmer
- 2004: 3rd, together with Rolf Zurbrügg and Rico Elmer

=== Trofeo Mezzalama ===
- 2001: 4th, together with Emanuel Buchs and Rico Elmer
- 2003: 1st, together with Rolf Zurbrügg and Rico Elmer
