= Pierre Bruchez =

Swiss ski mountaineer

Personal information
- Born: 2 July 1985 (age 41)

Sport
- Sport: Skiing
Medal record
Ski mountaineering
Representing Switzerland
World Championships
Silver medal – second place	2008 World Championship	Relay
Silver medal – second place	2010 World Championship	Relay
Bronze medal – third place	2004 World Championship	Relay
European Championships
Bronze medal – third place	2009 European Championship	Relay

Pierre Bruchez (born 2 July 1985) is a Swiss ski mountaineer.

== Selected results ==
- 2003:
  - 1st (juniors), Trophée des Gastlosenm together with Toni Niggli
- 2004:
  - 1st, Trophée des Gastlosen, together with Alain Richard
  - 3rd, World Championship relay race (together with Alexander Hug, Alain Richard and Rico Elmer
- 2005:
  - 1st (espoirs), Trophée des Gastlosen, together with Alain Richard
- 2008:
  - 2nd, World Championship relay race (together with Martin Anthamatten, Florent Troillet and Didier Moret
  - 10th, World Championship vertical race
  - 2nd, Trophée des Gastlosen, together with Didier Moret
- 2009:
  - 3rd, European Championship relay race (together with Florent Troillet, Marcel Marti and Yannick Ecoeur)
  - 5th, Trofeo Mezzalama (together with Didier Moret and Ernest Farquet)
  - 9th, Pierra Menta (together with Yannick Ecoeur)
- 2010:
  - 2nd, World Championship relay race (together with Florent Troillet, Martin Anthamatten and Yannick Ecoeur)

=== Patrouille des Glaciers ===
- 2006: 6th "senior I" class ranking, together with Mathieu Charvoz and Alain Richard
- 2008: 7th and 1st in the international military teams ranking, together with Cpl Yannick Ecoeur and Garde-frontière Marcel Marti
- 2010: 5th, together with Didier Moret and Marcel Marti
