= Emanuel Buchs =

Swiss ski mountaineer, cross-country skier, and biathlete

Emanuel Buchs (born 2 January 1962) is a Swiss ski mountaineer, cross-country skier and biathlete.

== Biography ==
Buchs started competition sports at the age of 14 years and became a member of the national "juniors" biathlon team at the age of 16. Four years later he became a member of the national "seniors" team, but had to leave it because of time reasons. He won six Swiss championship of cross-country skiing relay titles. He competed several times in the Patrouille des Glaciers race, and placed four times first and one time second with his teams. Professionally he is deployed in the 5th Border Guard Corps. He is married with two children and lives in Ulrichen. Together with his wife Marianne and his son Yannick he competed in the Baschi Triathlon in 2007.

== Selected results ==
=== Biathlon ===
- 1997:
  - 1st, Swiss Championship relay

=== Ski mountaineering ===
- 2000:
  - 1st and course record, Tour de Matterhorn (together with Damien Farquet and Rico Elmer)
- 2001:
  - 4th, Trofeo Mezzalama (together with Damien Farquet and Rico Elmer)

==== Patrouille des Glaciers ====
- 1990: 1st (international military teams ranking), together with Michel Chesaux and André Rey
- 1992: 2nd (international military teams ranking), together with Michel Chesaux and André Rey
- 1996: 1st (international military teams ranking), together with Damien Farquet and André Rey
- 1998: 1st, together with Pvt E-2 Damien Farquet and Pvt E-2 Rico Elmer
- 2000: 1st and course record, together with Pvt E-2 Damien Farquet and Pvt E-2 Rico Elmer
