= Monthey =

- Municipality
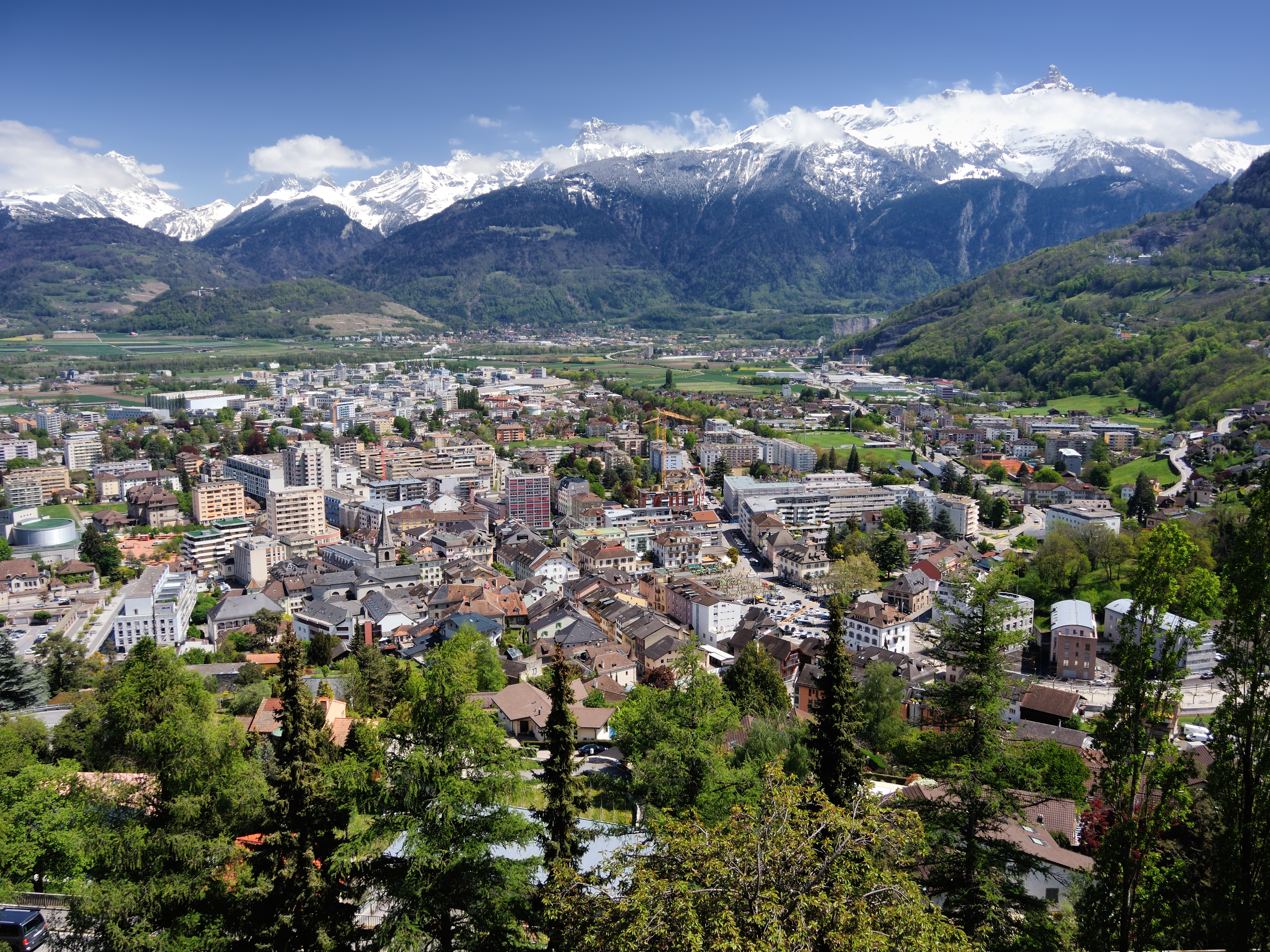
- Monthey from Pierre des Marmettes

- Flag Coat of arms
- Location of Monthey
- Location within Switzerland Location within Canton of Valais
- Coordinates: 46°15′N 6°57′E
- Country: Switzerland
- Canton: Valais
- District: Monthey

Government
  - Mayor: Stéphane Coppey CVP/PDC

Area
  - Total: 28.6 km^{2} (11.0 sq mi)

Population (2005)
  - Total: 15,299
  - Density: 535/km^{2} (1,390/sq mi)
- Demonym: Les Montheysans
- Time zone: UTC+01:00 (CET)
  - Summer (DST): UTC+02:00 (CEST)
- Postal code: 1870
- SFOS number: 6153
- ISO 3166 code: CH-VS
- Surrounded by: Bex (VD), Châtel (FR-74), Collombey-Muraz, Massongex, Montriond (FR-74), Ollon (VD), Troistorrents, Val-d'Illiez, Vérossaz
- Twin towns: Diekirch (Luxembourg), Ivrea (Italy), Tübingen (Germany), Göd (Hungary)
- Website: www.monthey.ch

Monthey (French pronunciation: [mɔ̃tɛ]; Arpitan: Montê) is the capital of the district of Monthey in the canton of Valais in Switzerland.

Historic aerial photograph by Werner Friedli from 1949

== History ==
The castle in the town center was built in 950 on a hill, the first houses of Monthey surrounded it. Monthey is first mentioned in 1215 as Montez. At the 13th century, the counts of Savoy owned the village and its area. In 1352, the count Amédée VI gave more freedom to the inhabitants. During the first part of the 14th century, there were several industries including silk production and grinding mills.

== Geography ==
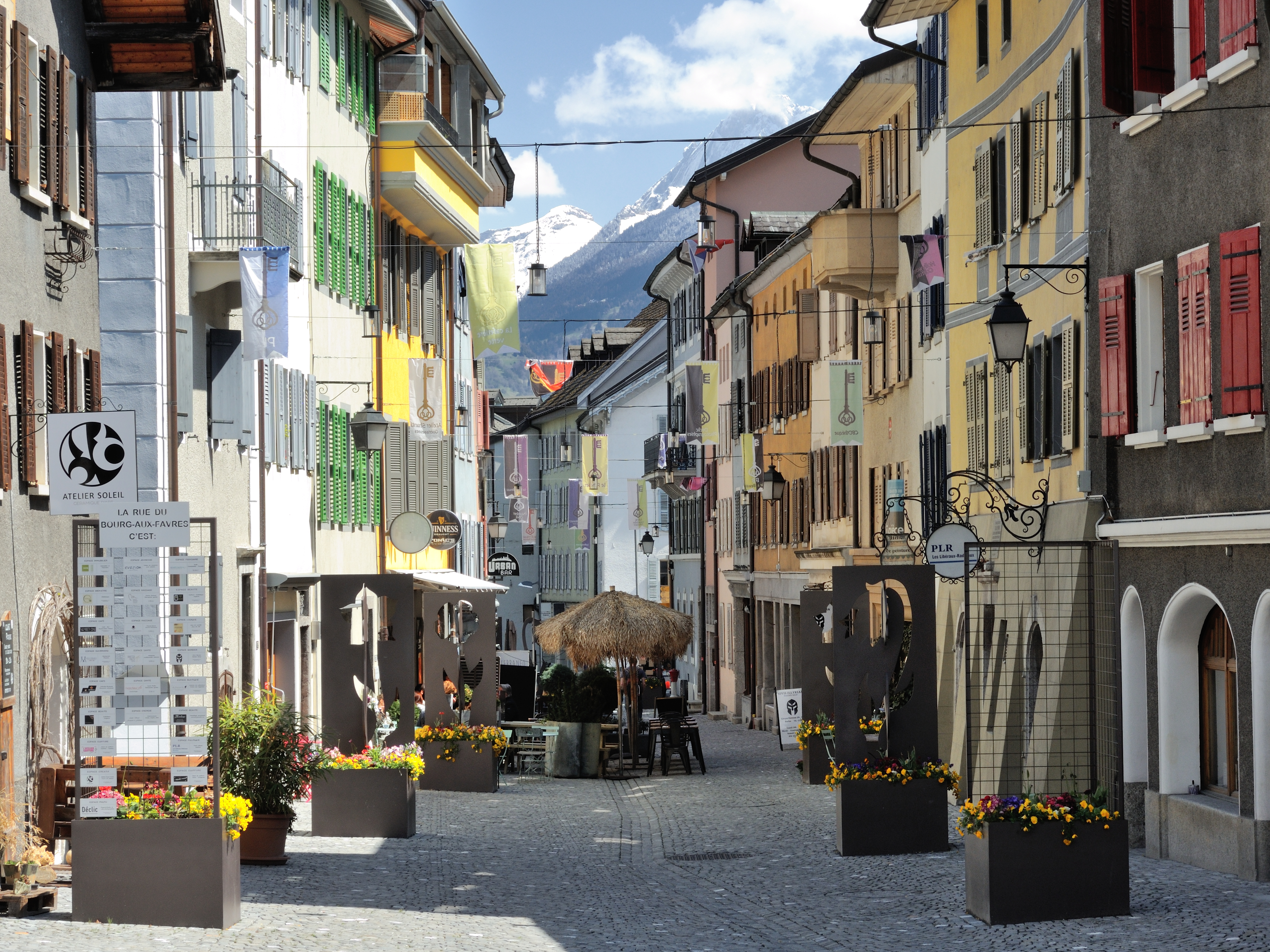
Old town

Monthey has an area, as of 2009, of 28.6 square kilometers (11.0 mi^{2}). Of this area, 7.86 km^{2} (3.03 mi^{2}) or 27.5% is used for agricultural purposes, while 12.91 km^{2} (4.98 mi^{2}) or 45.1% is forested. Of the rest of the land, 5.47 km^{2} (2.11 mi^{2}) or 19.1% is settled (buildings or roads), 0.43 km^{2} (0.17 mi^{2}) or 1.5% is either rivers or lakes and 1.91 km^{2} (0.74 mi^{2}) or 6.7% is unproductive land.

Of the built up area, industrial buildings made up 3.9% of the total area while housing and buildings made up 8.4% and transportation infrastructure made up 4.3%. Power and water infrastructure as well as other special developed areas made up 1.6% of the area Out of the forested land, 40.7% of the total land area is heavily forested and 1.8% is covered with orchards or small clusters of trees. Of the agricultural land, 5.6% is used for growing crops and 4.8% is pastures and 16.2% is used for alpine pastures. Of the water in the municipality, 0.5% is in lakes and 1.0% is in rivers and streams. Of the unproductive areas, 5.1% is unproductive vegetation and 1.6% is too rocky for vegetation.

The municipality is the capital of the Monthey District. This urban center of the Chablais region is located on an alluvial fan of the Vieze on the left bank of the Rhône, at the entrance to Val d'Illiez and the Pas de Morgins which leads to Val d'Abondance. It consists of the town of Monthey, the villages of Outrevièze and Choëx and exclaves in Collombey-Muraz. Monthey is located on the west side of the Rhône valley, south to the Leman Lake.

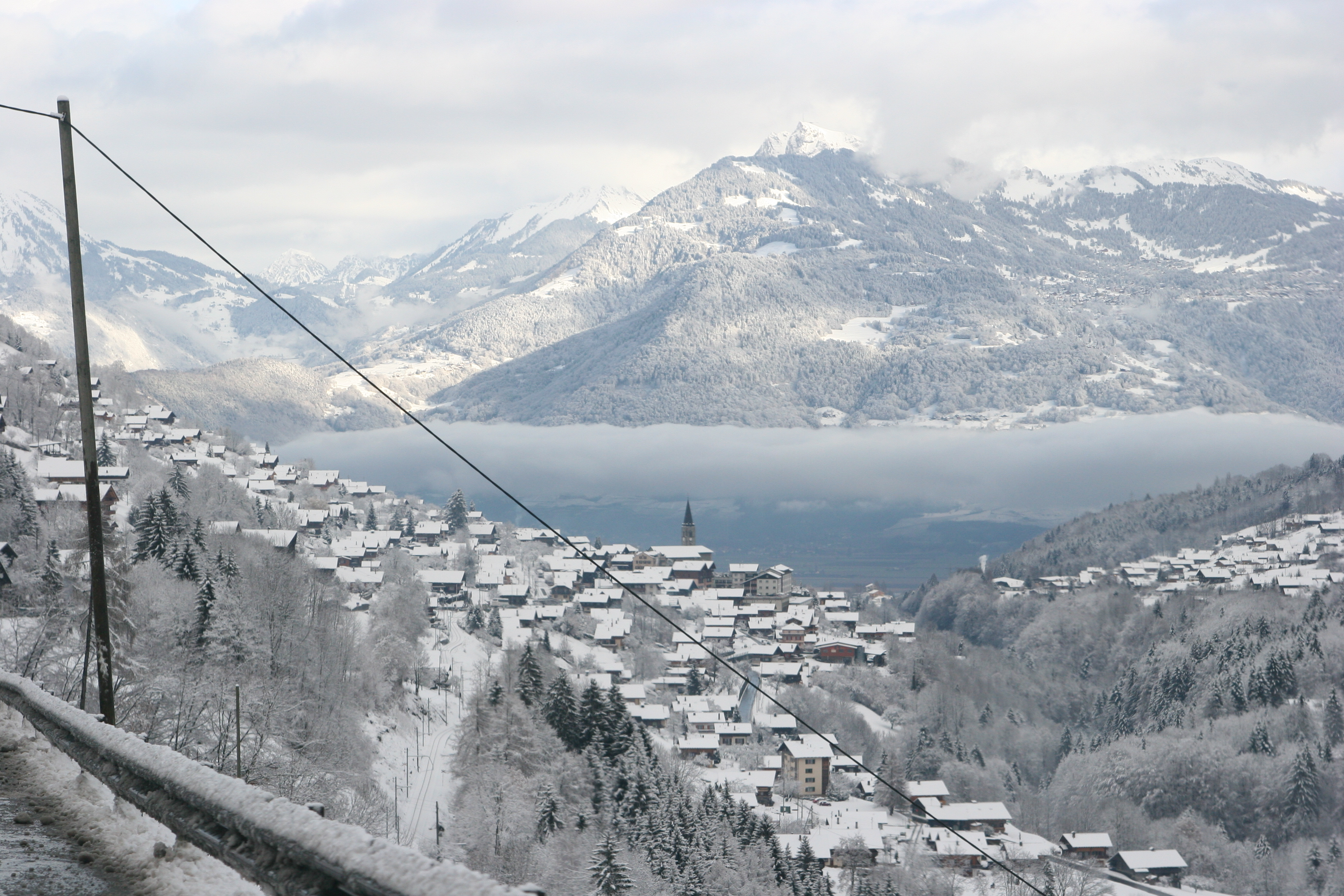
Winter in Monthey

== Coat of arms ==
The blazon of the municipal coat of arms is Or, issuant from coupeaux Vert an Oak tree proper leaved and fructed of the second.

== Demographics ==
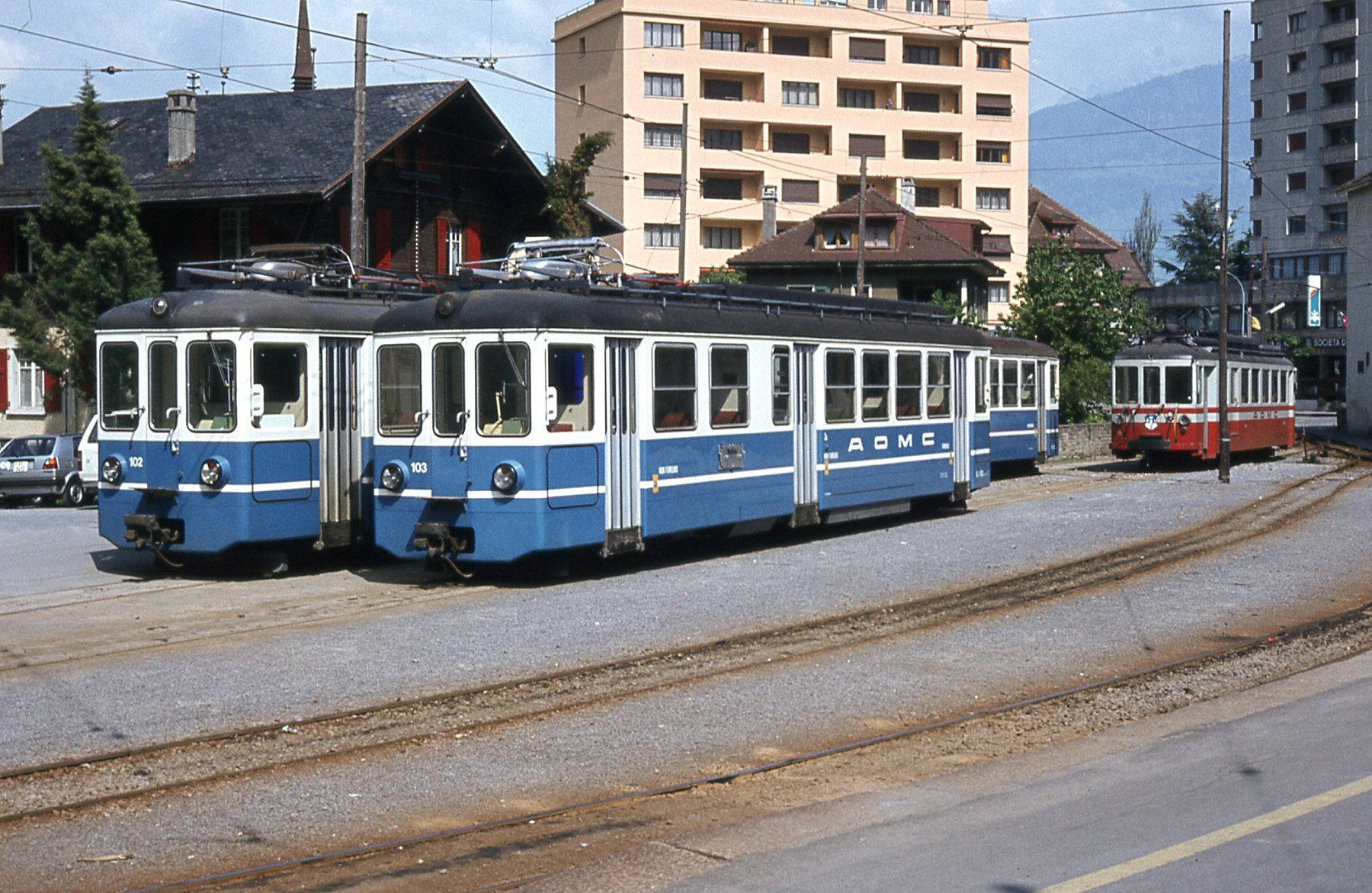
Trams of the old B.L.T. line at a former station in Monthey

Monthey has a population (as of December 2020) of 17,820. As of 2008, 29.0% of the population are resident foreign nationals. Over the last 10 years (2000–2010 ) the population has changed at a rate of 17.5%. It has changed at a rate of 16.2% due to migration and at a rate of 3.4% due to births and deaths.

Most of the population (as of 2000) speaks French (11,856 or 85.1%) as their first language, Italian is the second most common (520 or 3.7%) and Portuguese is the third (430 or 3.1%). There are 295 people who speak German and 7 people who speak Romansh.

As of 2008, the population was 49.0% male and 51.0% female. The population was made up of 5,515 Swiss men (33.6% of the population) and 2,539 (15.4%) non-Swiss men. There were 6,171 Swiss women (37.5%) and 2,212 (13.5%) non-Swiss women. Of the population in the municipality, 4,611 or about 33.1% were born in Monthey and lived there in 2000. There were 2,769 or 19.9% who were born in the same canton, while 2,508 or 18.0% were born somewhere else in Switzerland, and 3,586 or 25.7% were born outside of Switzerland.

As of 2000, children and teenagers (0–19 years old) make up 24.1% of the population, while adults (20–64 years old) make up 62.3% and seniors (over 64 years old) make up 13.6%.

As of 2000, there were 5,724 people who were single and never married in the municipality. There were 6,463 married individuals, 836 widows or widowers and 910 individuals who are divorced.

As of 2000, there were 5,949 private households in the municipality, and an average of 2.3 persons per household. There were 2,161 households that consist of only one person and 340 households with five or more people. In 2000, a total of 5,697 apartments (80.3% of the total) were permanently occupied, while 1,058 apartments (14.9%) were seasonally occupied and 339 apartments (4.8%) were empty. As of 2009, the construction rate of new housing units was 3.6 new units per 1000 residents. The vacancy rate for the municipality, in 2010, was 0.24%.

Historical population

Year	Pop.	±% p.a.
1329	728 (182 Hearths)	—
1422	224 (56 Hearths)	—
1850	1,841	—
1860	2,114	+1.39%
1870	2,633	+2.22%
1880	2,683	+0.19%

Year	Pop.	±% p.a.
1888	2,598	−0.40%
1900	3,392	+2.25%
1910	4,301	+2.40%
1920	4,695	+0.88%
1930	4,901	+0.43%
1941	4,927	+0.05%

Year	Pop.	±% p.a.
1950	5,608	+1.45%
1960	6,834	+2.00%
1970	10,114	+4.00%
1980	11,285	+1.10%
1990	13,790	+2.02%
2000	13,933	+0.10%

== Sport and culture ==
In winter 2005, Monthey was chosen to be the host of the EYOF (European Youth Olympic Festival).

Monthey is home to the BBC Monthey, 1996 and 2005 Champion of the Swiss Basketball League. The team plays its home games at the Reposieux.

FC Monthey is the town's football club, founded in 1910.

Every winter, Monthey hosts a well known Carnaval in the entire region. The 2018 Carnaval was called "Carnaval Bestial" in French and lasted from 8 to 13 February.

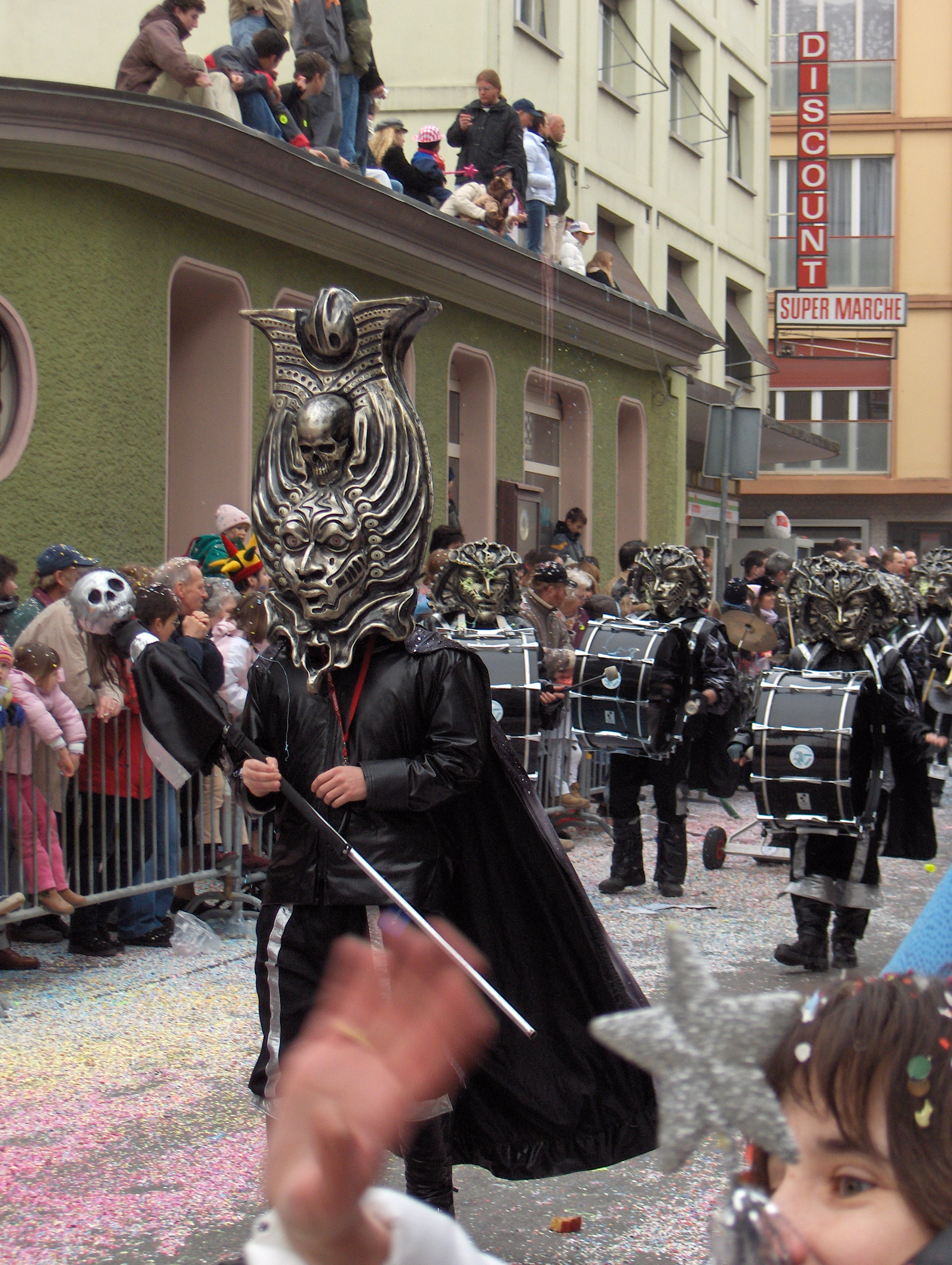
Carnival at Monthey (2007)

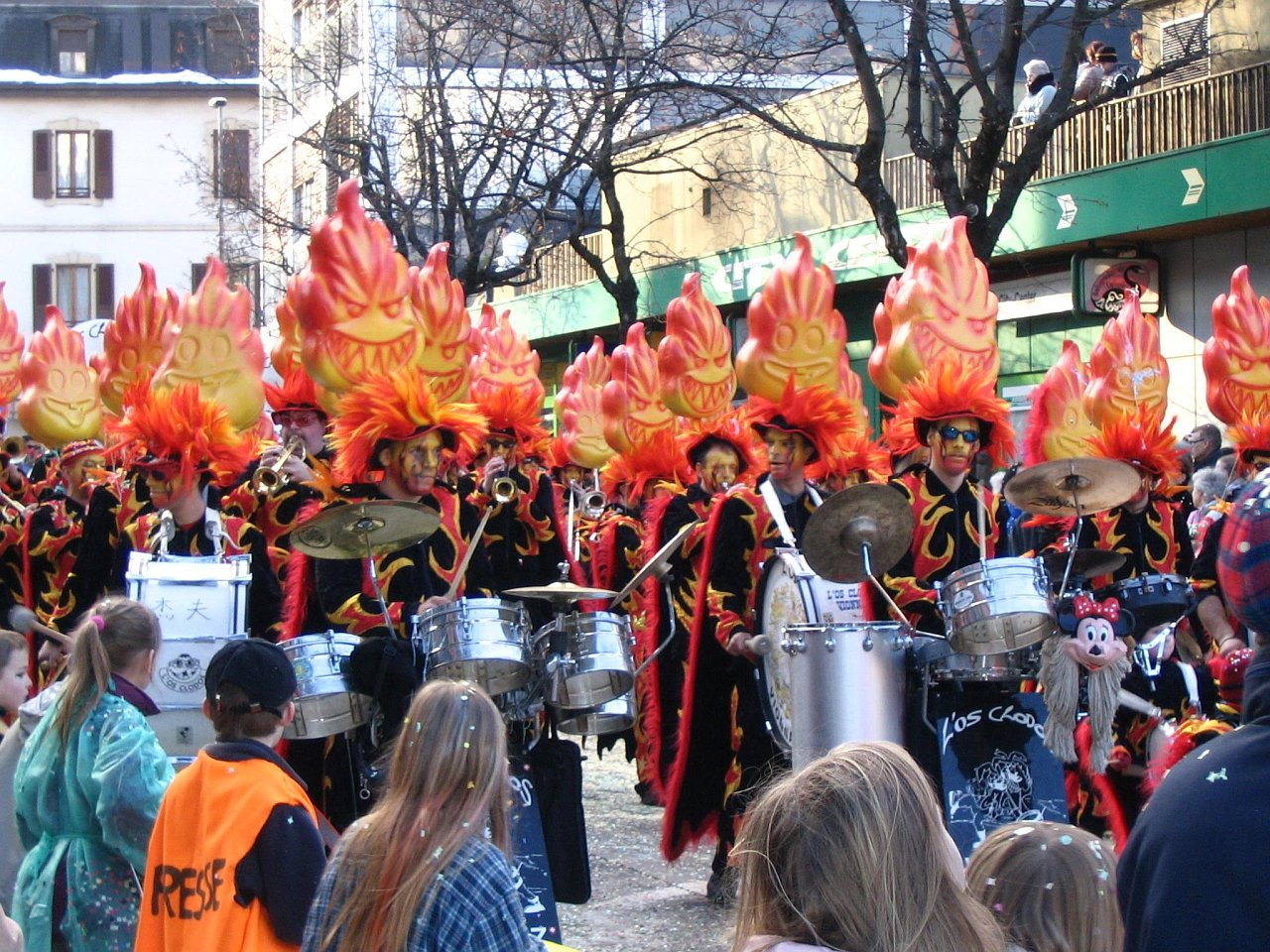
Carnival at Monthey

== Politics ==
In the 2007 federal election the most popular party was the CVP which received 26.33% of the vote. The next three most popular parties were the FDP (23.4%), the SVP (21.95%) and the SP (18.09%). In the federal election, a total of 4,267 votes were cast, and the voter turnout was 47.5%.

In the 2009 Conseil d'État/Staatsrat election a total of 3,342 votes were cast, of which 261 or about 7.8% were invalid. The voter participation was 37.0%, which is much less than the cantonal average of 54.67%. In the 2007 Swiss Council of States election a total of 4,131 votes were cast, of which 413 or about 10.0% were invalid. The voter participation was 46.8%, which is much less than the cantonal average of 59.88%.

== Economy ==
Monthey is important to Swiss industry, with the former chemical company Ciba-Geigy (now Novartis, Syngenta and Cimo) and the metallurgical company Giovanola, there is an oil refinery in Collombey-Muraz, near Monthey. The city is close to the famous winter sports region, the Portes du Soleil.

This city is also home to Bolliger & Mabillard, world-famous roller coaster designers.

As of 2010, Monthey had an unemployment rate of 6.7%. As of 2008, there were 37 people employed in the primary economic sector and about 25 businesses involved in this sector. 3,420 people were employed in the secondary sector and there were 146 businesses in this sector. 5,453 people were employed in the tertiary sector, with 616 businesses in this sector. There were 6,788 residents of the municipality who were employed in some capacity, of which females made up 43.8% of the workforce.

In 2008 the total number of full-time equivalent jobs was 7,689. The number of jobs in the primary sector was 19, of which 15 were in agriculture and 3 were in forestry or lumber production. The number of jobs in the secondary sector was 3,330 of which 2,062 or (61.9%) were in manufacturing and 696 (20.9%) were in construction. The number of jobs in the tertiary sector was 4,340. In the tertiary sector; 1,087 or 25.0% were in wholesale or retail sales or the repair of motor vehicles, 125 or 2.9% were in the movement and storage of goods, 287 or 6.6% were in a hotel or restaurant, 69 or 1.6% were in the information industry, 156 or 3.6% were the insurance or financial industry, 405 or 9.3% were technical professionals or scientists, 203 or 4.7% were in education and 1,504 or 34.7% were in health care.

In 2000, there were 5,264 workers who commuted into the municipality and 2,700 workers who commuted away. The municipality is a net importer of workers, with about 1.9 workers entering the municipality for every one leaving. About 3.7% of the workforce coming into Monthey are coming from outside Switzerland. Of the working population, 7.7% used public transportation to get to work, and 61.7% used a private car.

== Religion ==
From the 2000 census, 9,790 or 70.3% were Roman Catholic, while 1,381 or 9.9% belonged to the Swiss Reformed Church. Of the rest of the population, there were 163 members of an Orthodox church (or about 1.17% of the population), there were 5 individuals (or about 0.04% of the population) who belonged to the Christian Catholic Church, and there were 335 individuals (or about 2.40% of the population) who belonged to another Christian church. There were 8 individuals (or about 0.06% of the population) who were Jewish, and 744 (or about 5.34% of the population) who were Islamic. There were 28 individuals who were Buddhist, 10 individuals who were Hindu and 15 individuals who belonged to another church. 888 (or about 6.37% of the population) belonged to no church, are agnostic or atheist, and 725 individuals (or about 5.20% of the population) did not answer the question.

== Education ==
In Monthey about 4,644 or (33.3%) of the population have completed non-mandatory upper secondary education, and 1,361 or (9.8%) have completed additional higher education (either university or a Fachhochschule). Of the 1,361 who completed tertiary schooling, 53.6% were Swiss men, 28.7% were Swiss women, 11.1% were non-Swiss men and 6.6% were non-Swiss women.

As of 2000, there were 256 students in Monthey who came from another municipality, while 389 residents attended schools outside the municipality.

Monthey is home to the Médiathèque de Monthey library. The library has (as of 2008) 41,818 books or other media, and loaned out 95,847 items in the same year. It was open a total of 265 days with average of 20 hours per week during that year.

The Stained Glass Arts and Fine Arts College is located in Monthey.

== Notable people ==
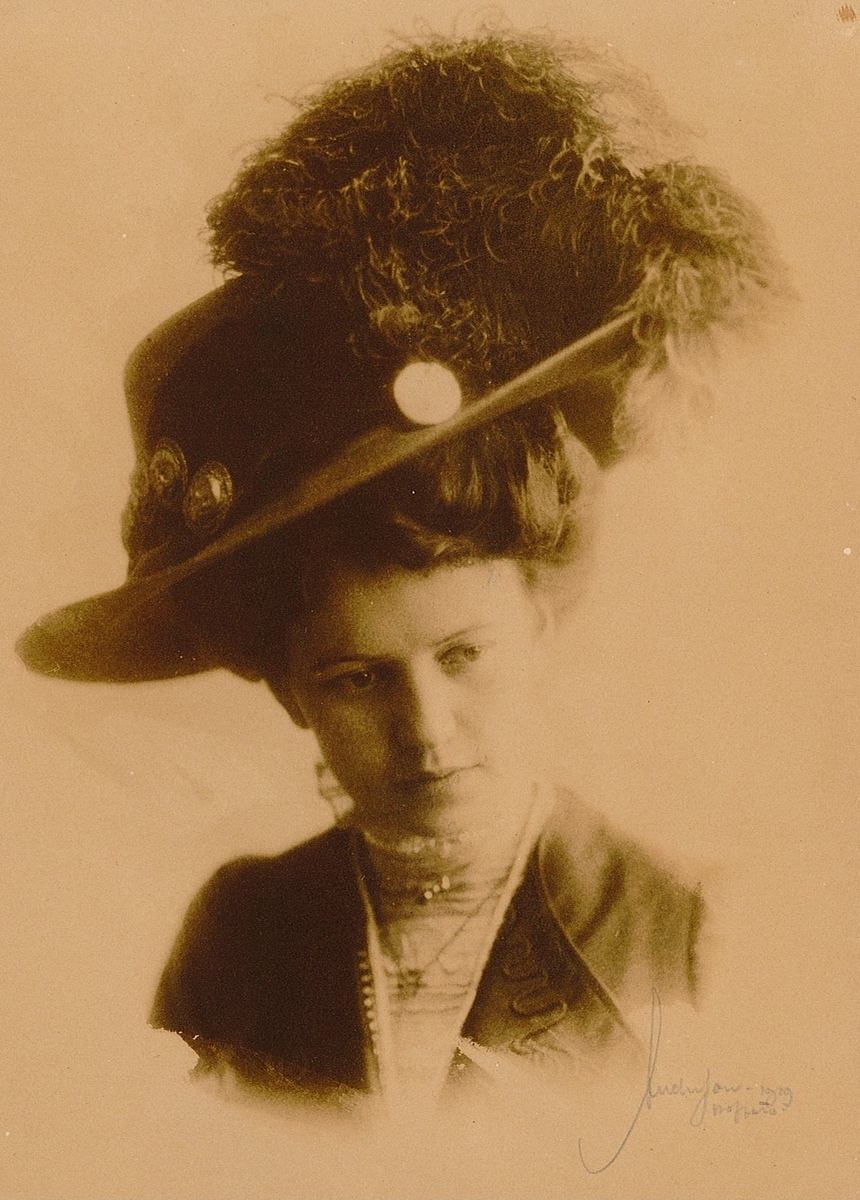
Kaja Eide Norena, 1909

- Eidé Norena (1884 – 1968 in Monthey) a Norwegian soprano
- Pierre Mariétan (born 1935 in Monthey) a Swiss composer of serialist, electronic and radiophonic music
- Philippe Pottier (1938 in Monthey – 1985) a Swiss footballer
- Jean-Luc Benoziglio (1941 in Monthey – 2013) a Swiss writer and publishing editor
- Pierre-Yves Borgeaud (born 1963 in Monthey) a Swiss film director
- André Simonazzi (born 1968 in Monthey – 2024), a Swiss politician
- Emmanuel Vaudan (born 1971) from Monthey, a Swiss ski mountaineer and long-distance runner
- Andréa Zimmermann (born 1976) from Monthey, a Swiss ski mountaineer and mountain runner
- Steve Morabito (born 1983 in Monthey) a Swiss professional road bicycle racer
- Demir Peco (born 1996 in Monthey) a Bosnian professional footballer
- Ralph Boschung (born 1997 in Monthey) a Swiss racing driver
- Berkan Kutlu (born 1998 in Monthey) a Turkish professional footballer
- Kyshawn George (born 2003) a Swiss Canadian basketball player

== Gallery ==
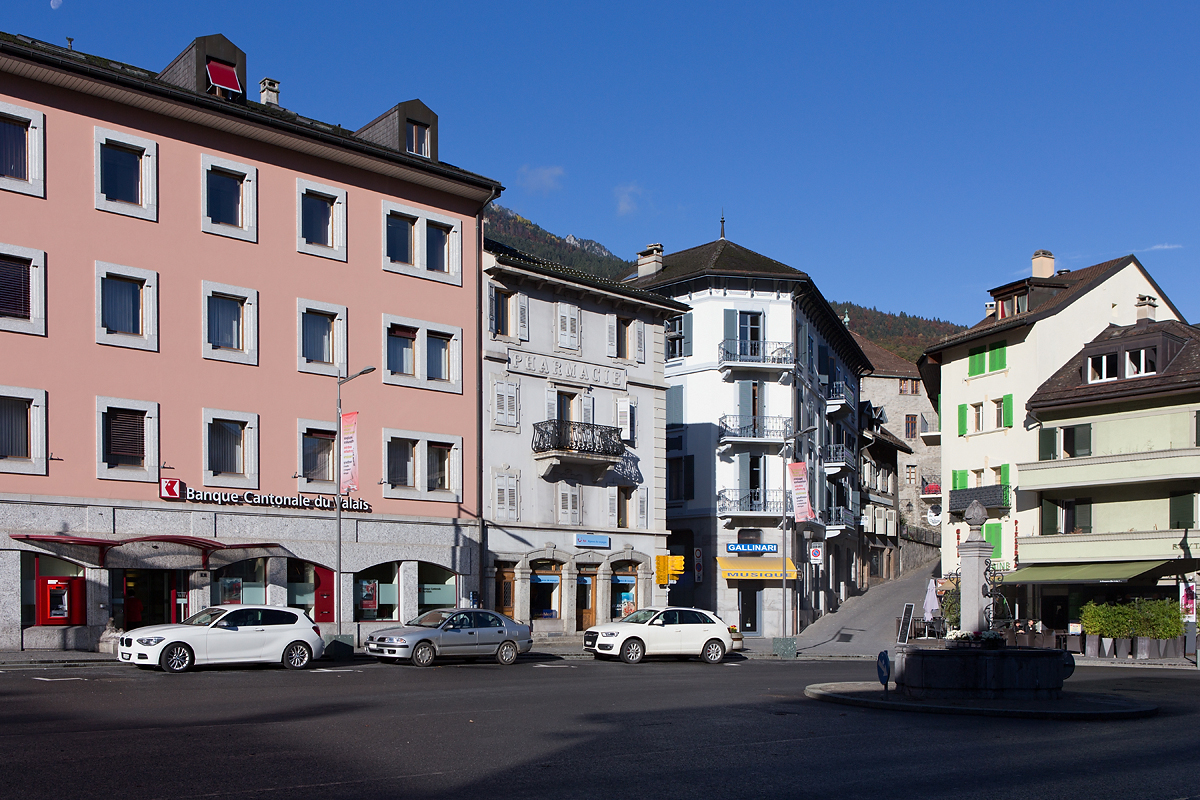
Place Centrale

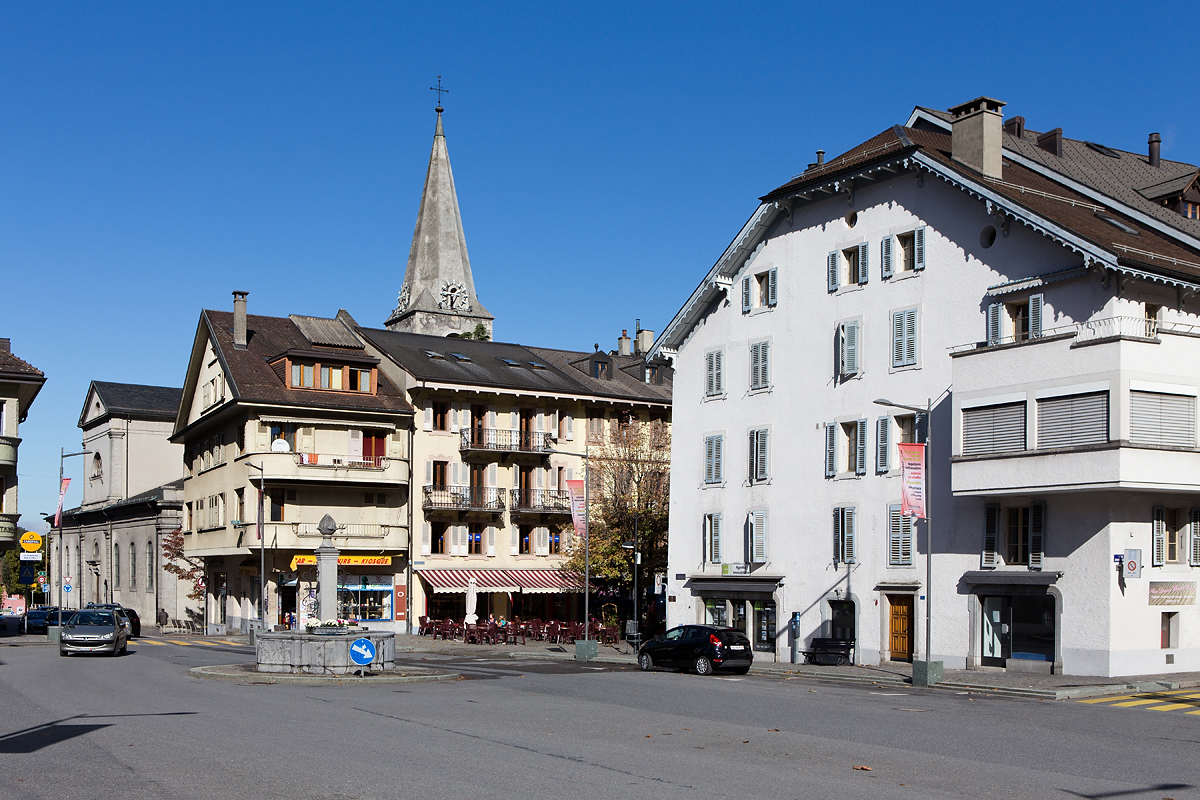
Place Centrale et l'église

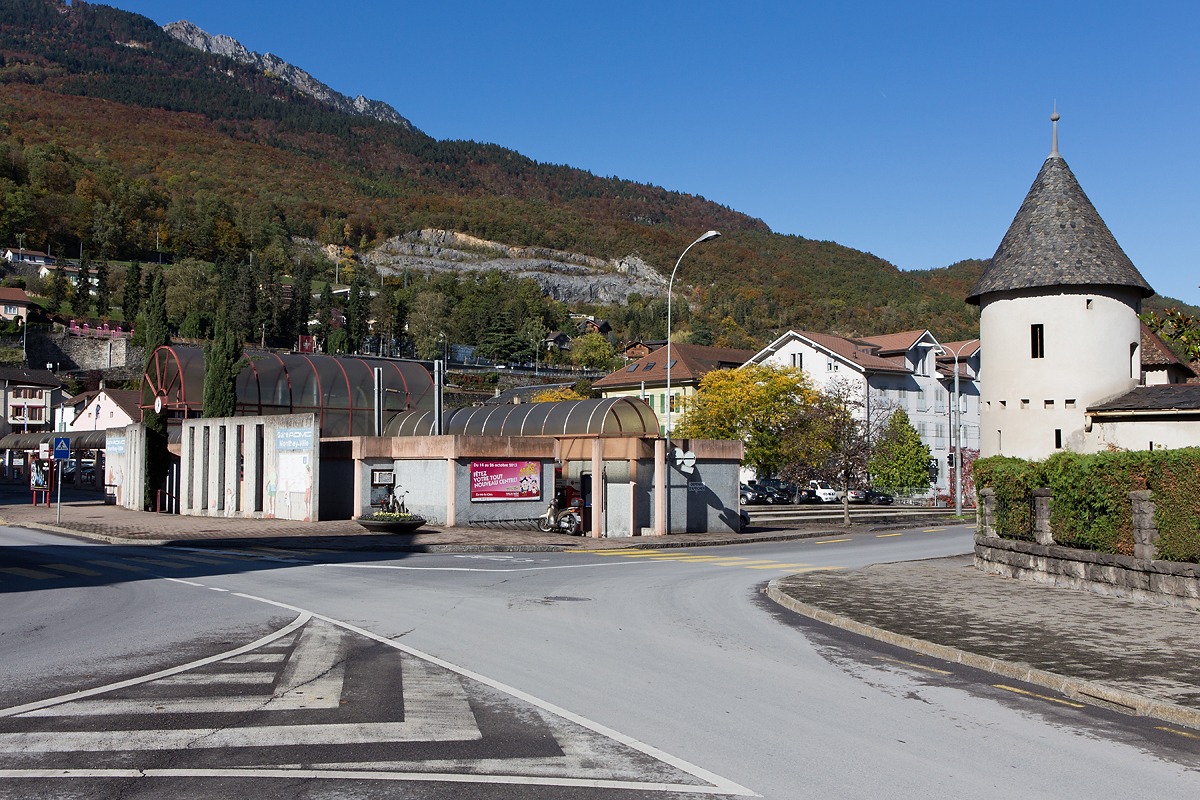
AOMC Station

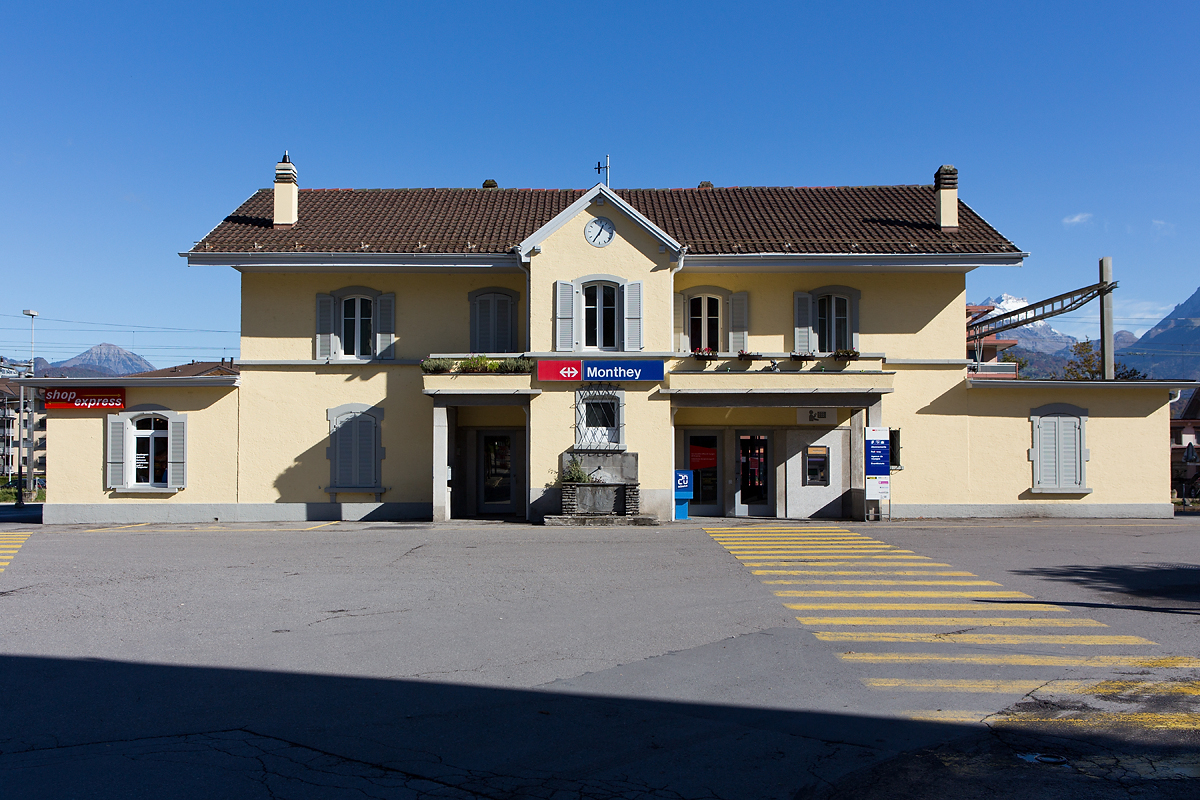
CFF Station

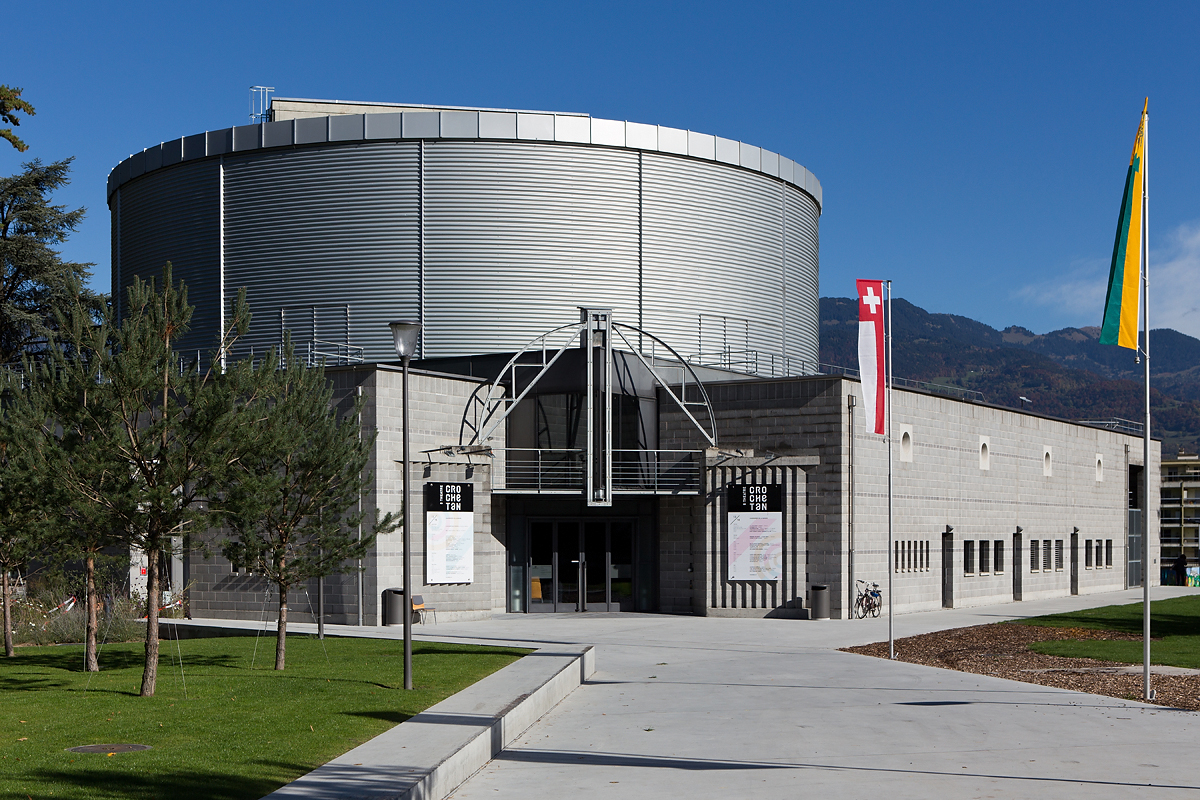
Theater of Crochetan

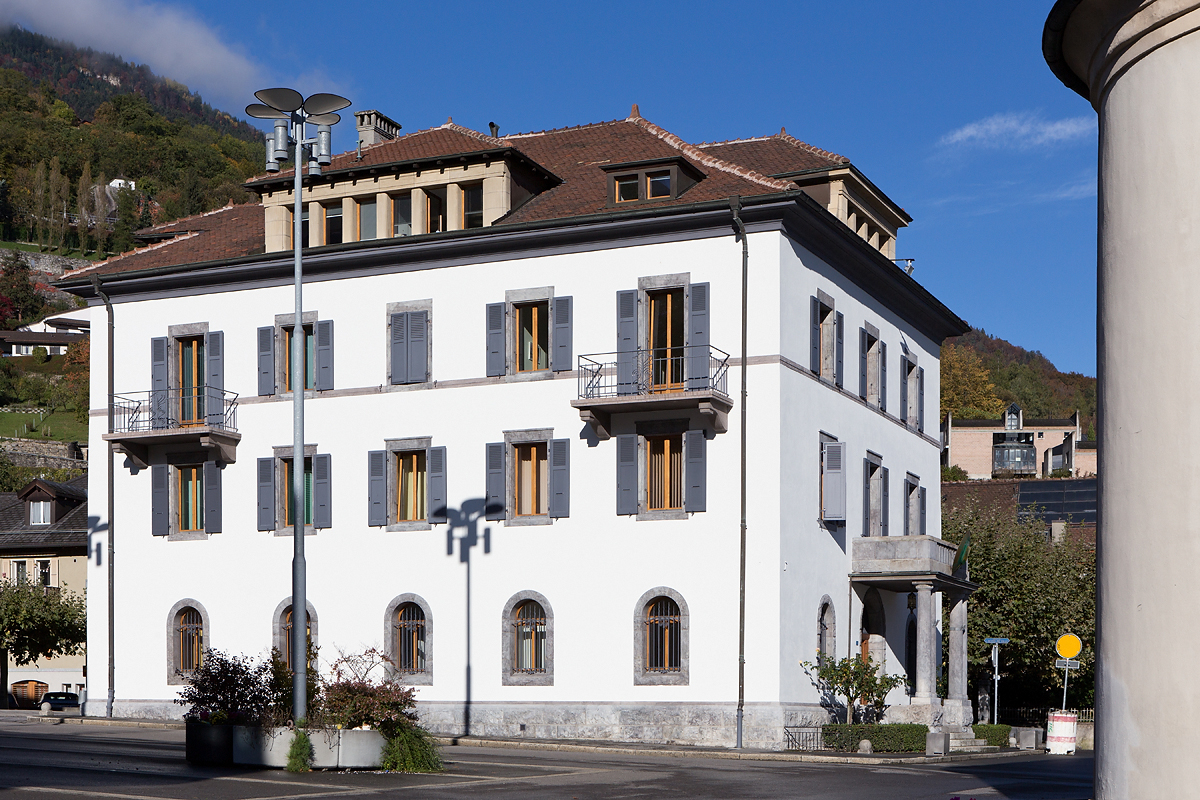
Hotel de Ville

== International relations ==
=== Twin towns – Sister cities ===
Monthey is twinned with:

Diekirch, Luxembourg; since 1954; Göd, Hungary; since 2007	Ivrea, Italy; since 1954; Tübingen, Germany; since 1959
