= Stained Glass Arts and Fine Arts College =

Art school in Monthey, Switzerland

Stained Glass Arts and Fine Arts College (French: L'Ecole de Vitrail et de Création) is a school in Monthey, Switzerland offering instruction leading to a Glass Craftsman diploma.
