= Compagnie industrielle de Monthey =

Swiss chemical company

Cimo, or the Compagnie industrielle de Monthey SA, is an infrastructure, energy and technical services company based at Monthey in the Swiss canton of Valais. It is jointly owned by CATEXCEL, SUN Chemicals and Syngenta.
