= Dent de Ruth =

Mountain in Switzerland

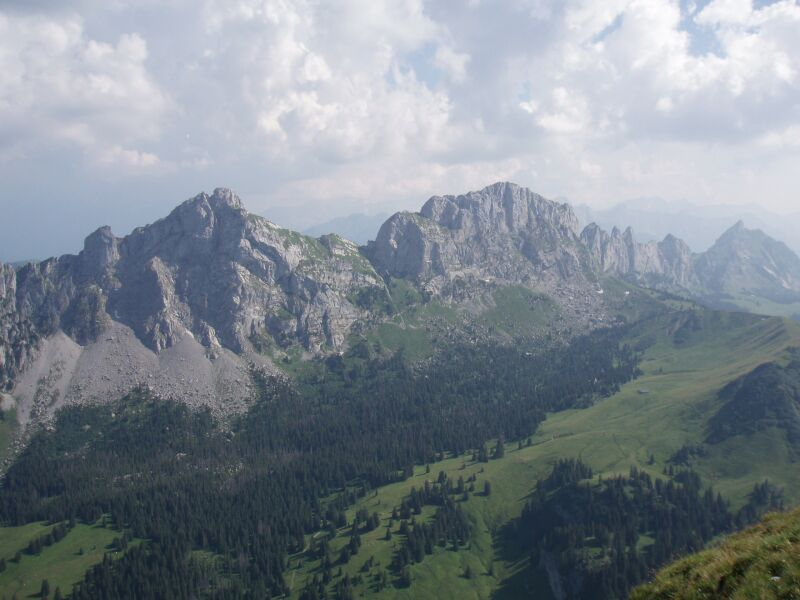
- Dent de Ruth (left) and Dent de Savigny (right)

Highest point
- Elevation: 2,236 m (7,336 ft)
- Prominence: 186 m (610 ft)
- Parent peak: Dent de Savigny
- Coordinates: 46°33′13.7″N 7°14′13.8″E

Geography
- Location within Switzerland
- Location: Fribourg/Bern/Vaud, Switzerland
- Parent range: Bernese Alps

The Dent de Ruth is a mountain in the Bernese Alps in Switzerland. The summit is the tripoint between the cantons of Vaud, Bern and Fribourg.
