= Daniel Hediger =

Swiss biathlete (born 1958)

Personal information
- Nationality: Swiss
- Born: 14 October 1958 (age 66)

Sport
- Sport: Biathlon

Daniel Hediger (born 14 October 1958) is a Swiss biathlete. He competed in the men's sprint event at the 1994 Winter Olympics.
