= Dent de Savigny =

Mountain in Switzerland

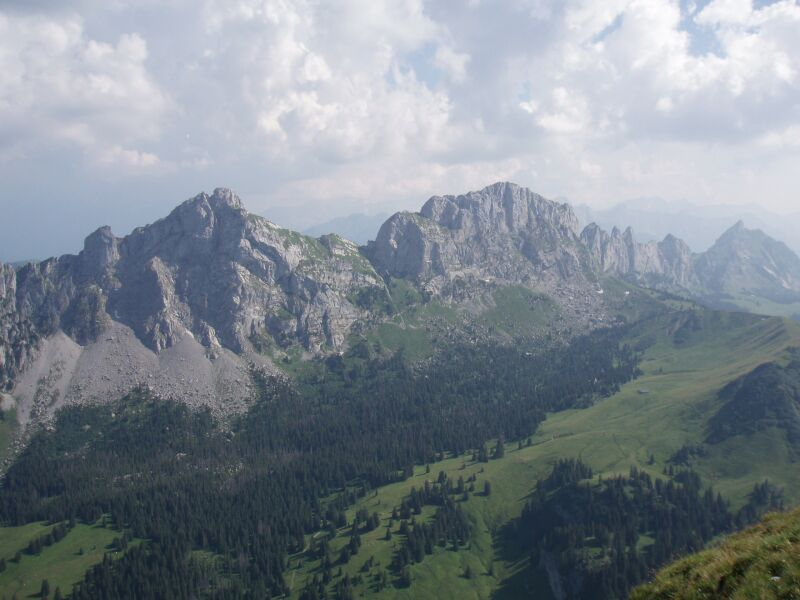
- Dent de Ruth (left) and Dent de Savagny (right)

Highest point
- Elevation: 2,252 m (7,388 ft)
- Prominence: 848 m (2,782 ft)
- Parent peak: Vanil Noir
- Coordinates: 46°32′58.8″N 7°13′36.4″E

Naming
- English translation: Savigny's Tooth
- Language of name: French

Geography
- Location within Switzerland
- Location: Fribourg/Vaud, Switzerland
- Range coordinates: 46°32′58.8006″N 7°13′36.4008″E
- Parent range: Bernese Alps

Geology
- Rock age: 770 Million Years

Climbing
- First ascent: 1905
- Easiest route: Southeast

The Dent de Savigny is a mountain of the Bernese Alps, located on the border between the Swiss cantons of Vaud and Fribourg. With an elevation of 2,252 metres above sea level, it one of the highest mountains in the canton of Fribourg.

The closest localities are Jaun (Fribourg) and Rougemont (Vaud).
