= Unterrothorn =

Mountain of the Swiss Pennine Alps

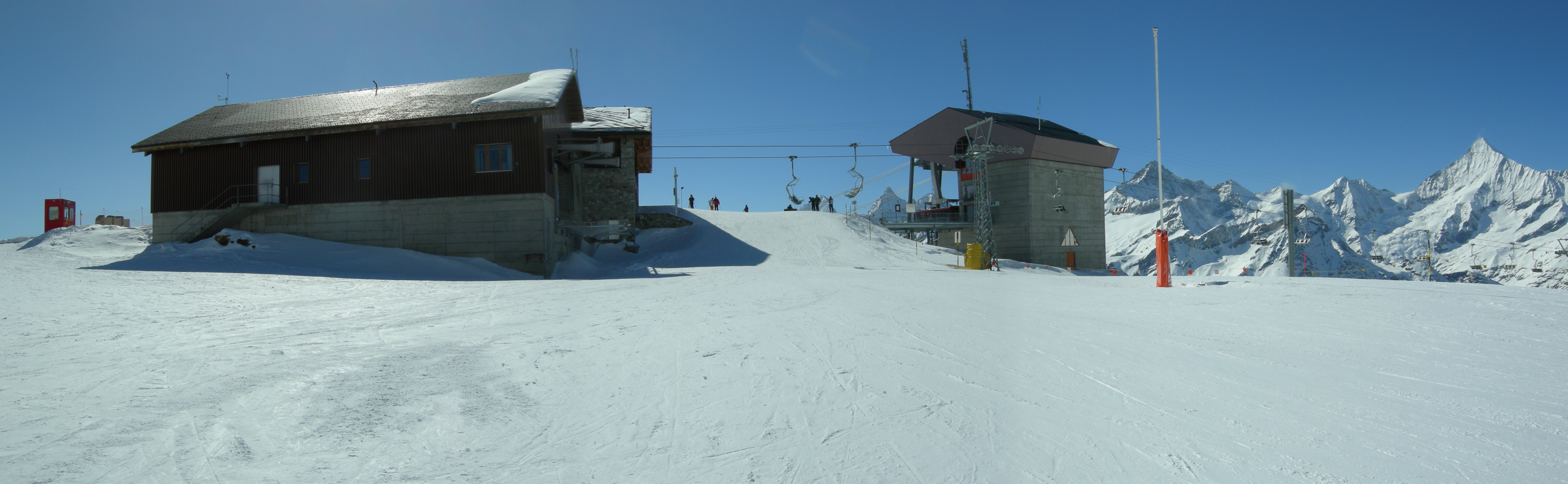

Highest point
- Elevation: 3,104 m (10,184 ft)
- Prominence: 123 m (404 ft)
- Parent peak: Monte Rosa
- Coordinates: 46°01′19″N 7°47′51″E

Geography
- Location within Switzerland
- Location: Valais, Switzerland
- Parent range: Pennine Alps

Climbing
- Easiest route: Cable car

The Unterrothorn (or simply Rothorn) is a mountain of the Swiss Pennine Alps, overlooking Zermatt in the canton of Valais. It is located west of the Oberrothorn, on the range north of the Findel Glacier.

The summit can be reached by cable car via Sunnegga and Blauherd. The Rothorn paradise is one of the main ski areas located around Zermatt.

== See also ==
- List of mountains of Switzerland accessible by public transport
