= Trophée des Gastlosen =

Annual Swiss competition of ski mountaineering

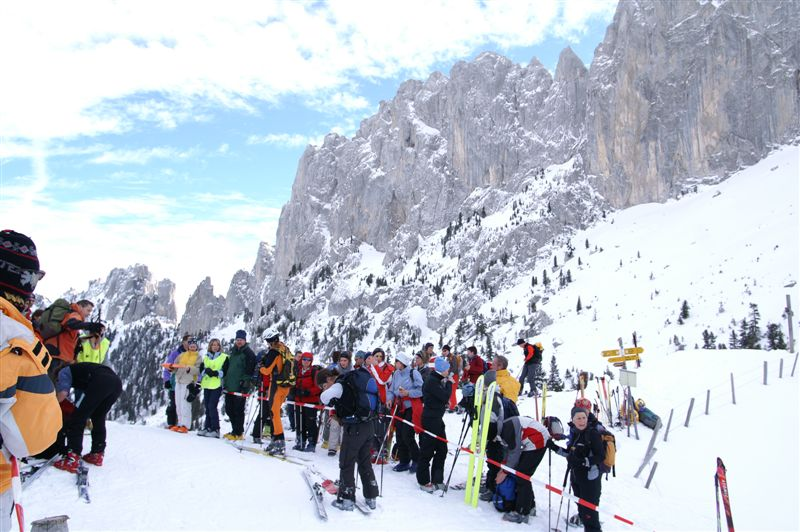
2006 edition

The Trophée des Gastlosen ("trophy of the Gastlosen") is a Swiss competition of ski mountaineering, which is carried out annually in the Gastlosen, near Jaun, since 1993.

The history of the Trophée des Gastlosen goes back to 1987, when Erhard Loretan had the idea to carry out the Patrouille des Poyets. The Trophée des Gastlosen has been part of the Swiss cup of ski mountaineering (Coupe Suisse de Ski Alpinisme) since 1995, was also part of the World Cup of skimountaineering as well as part of the Trophée des Alpes in 2002.

== Courses ==
The long distance course A includes a total altitude difference (ascent) of 2,190 m and a total altitude difference for downhill skiing of 2,230 m.

place	altitude	course A	course B
Jaun	980 m	starting point	-
Gratflue	1,920 m	check point	-
Abländschen	1,205 m	check and supply point	starting point
Wandflue	2,130 m	check point	
Petit-Mont	1,400 m	check and supply point	
Chalet du Soldat	1,752 m	check point	
Jaun	980 m	goal	
