= Upper Rhenish Circle =

Imperial circle of the Holy Roman Empire

The Upper Rhenish Circle as at the beginning of the 16th century

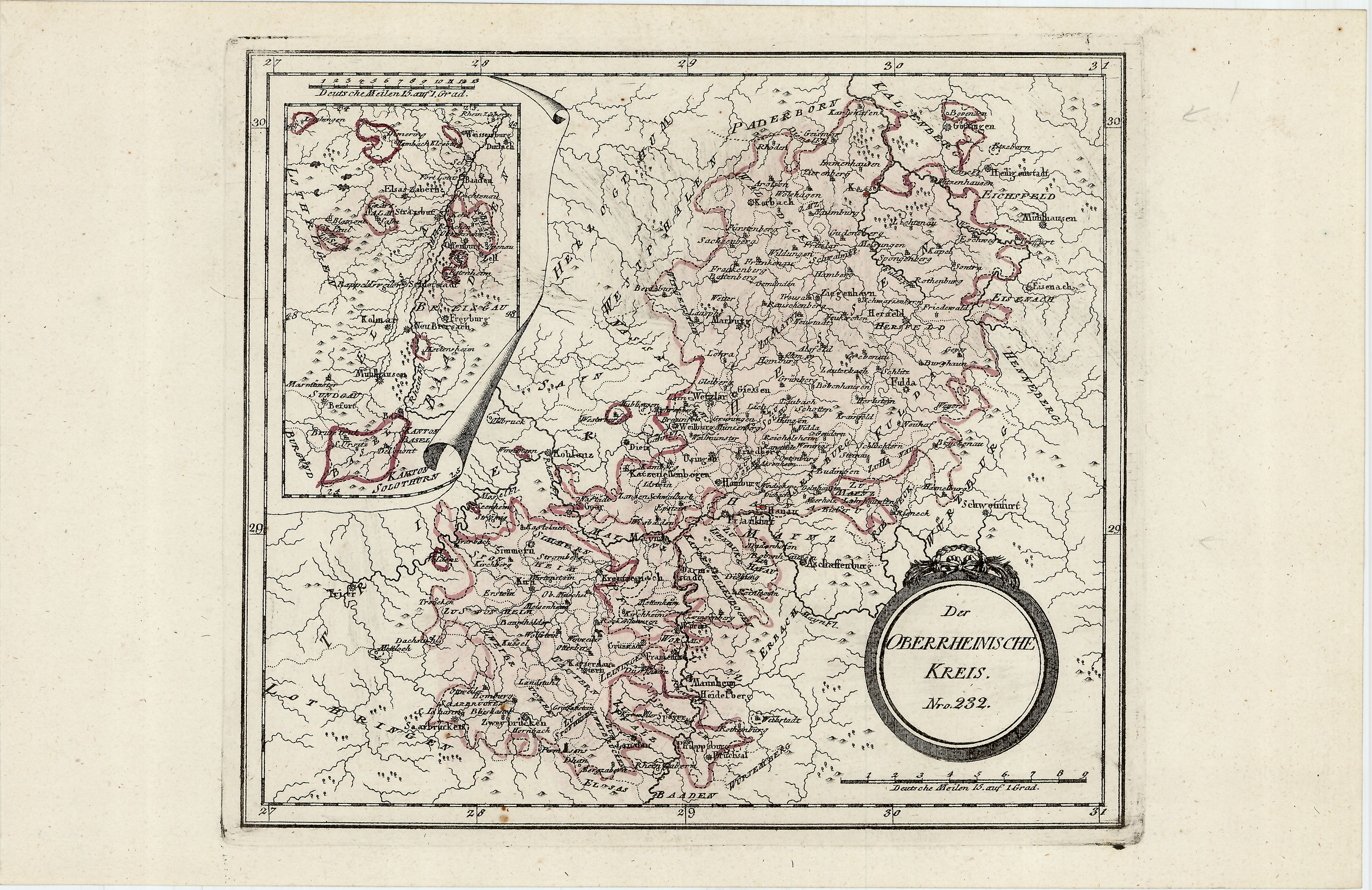
Upper Rhenish Circle 1791

The Upper Rhenish Circle (German: Oberrheinischer Reichskreis) was an imperial circle of the Holy Roman Empire established in 1500 on the territory of the former Duchy of Upper Lorraine and large parts of Rhenish Franconia including the Swabian Alsace region and the Burgundian duchy of Savoy. Many of the circle's states west of the Rhine river were annexed by France under King Louis XIV during the 17th century, sealed by the 1678/79 Treaties of Nijmegen.

== Composition ==
The circle was made up of the following states:

Name	Type of entity	Commentate
~~Andlau~~	Abbey	Former Prelature to France since 1681.
Bar	Duchy	United with Lorraine since 1483. Only the eastern part – Barrois non mouvant – lay within the Empire and therefore within the Upper Rhenish Circle; the western part – Barrois mouvant – was French territory since 1301. Annexed by France in 1766.
Basel	Prince-Bishopric	Established in the 8th century above the ancient Augusta Raurica, gained independence from Burgundy about 1000, residence at Porrentruy (Pruntrut) from 1527; 41st seat to the Reichstag
Baugé	County	Inherited by the House of Savoy in 1272. Raised to a county in 1424. Annexed by the Kingdom of France in the Treaty of Lyon in 1601.
Besançon	Prince-Archbishopric	(Bisanz) Annexed by France in 1679; its 8th seat to the Reichstag became vacant
Besançon	Free imperial city	City gained status as an free imperial city in 1184. The city lost status as a free city in 1654. Annexed in 1678 by France
Beuil	County	Initially created as a Lordship, Bueil was inherited by a cadet branch of the House of Grimaldi. Bueil became a nominal vassal of the County of Savoy in 1388. Raised by Savoy to a county in 1581. Annexed by the French First Republic in 1793 and restored to the Kingdom of Sardinia in 1813.
Bresse	Lordship	Inherited by the House of Savoy in 1272. Annexed by the Kingdom of France in the Treaty of Lyon in 1601.
Bretzenheim	Lordship	Held by Cologne, granted to Count Karl August of Heydeck, illegitimate son of Elector Charles Theodore of Bavaria in 1772, Imperial county in 1774, principality in 1789.
Bugey	Lordship	Conferred to the House of Savoy in 1077 by Henry IV. Annexed by the Kingdom of France in the Treaty of Lyon in 1601.
Chablais	Duchy	Established in the 11th century by the House of Savoy. Lost to Geneva in 1536.
Château-Chinon	Lordship	Conferred to Emperor Maximilian I in the Treaty of Arras in 1482. Raised to a county in 1506. Ceded to France in the Treaty of Noyon in 1516.
Colmar	Imperial City	Reichsfreiheit granted by Emperor Frederick II of Hohenstaufen in 1226, part of the Décapole since 1354.
Dagstuhl	Lordship	Held by the Lords of Fleckenstein, acquired by Oettingen-Wallerstein in 1697.
Dombes	Principality	Held by the Dukes of Bourbon since 1400, confiscated by the Kingdom of France in 1523.
Falkenstein	Lordship	Held by the Counts of Daun since 1456, raised to county in 1518, fell to Lorraine in 1667, administered with Further Austria from 1782.
Faucigny	Barony	Acquired by the House of Savoy by the 1355 Treaty of Paris. Annexed by the French First Republic in 1792. Returned to Savoy in 1816. Annexed by the Second French Empire in 1860.
Frankfurt am Main	Imperial City	6th Rhenish City. Since 1220, place of the Imperial election by the Golden Bull of 1356.
Friedberg	Imperial City	13th Rhenish City. Since 1252.
Fulda	Prince-Abbacy	Established by Saint Boniface in 744, Reichsfreiheit granted by Emperor Frederick II in 1220, raised to Prince-Bishopric in 1752, 53th seat to the Reichstag.
Geneva	Duchy	(Genf) Established in the 10th century as the County of Geneva. Capital moved from La Roche-sur-Foron to Annecy in 1219. Purchased by the House of Savoy in 1401 and raised to a Duchy in 1564. Annexed by the Second French Empire in 1860.
Gex	Barony	First mentioned in 1188. Ruled by a cadet branch of the County of Geneva until 1353 when annexed by Amadeus VI, Count of Savoy. Contested since 1536 between the Duchy of Savoy and the Old Swiss Confederacy until annexed by the Kingdom of France in the Treaty of Lyon in 1601.
Haguenau	Imperial City	(Hagenau) Since about 1260, capital of the Décapole since 1354.
Hanau-Lichtenberg	County	Partitioned from the County of Hanau as Hanau-Babenhausen in 1456, inherited the lordship of Lichtenberg in 1474, fell to Hesse-Darmstadt in 1736.
Hanau-Münzenberg	County	Partitioned from the County of Hanau in 1456, reunited with Hanau-Lichtenberg in 1642, fell to Hesse-Kassel in 1736.
Heitersheim	Principality	Held by the Order of St John since 1272, Reichsfreiheit granted by Emperor Charles V in 1548.
Hersfeld	Abbacy	Established about 736 by Saint Sturm, Reichsfreiheit granted by Charlemagne in 775, secularised to a principality by the 1648 Peace of Westphalia, held by Hesse-Kassel
Hesse	Landgraviate	Established after the War of the Thuringian Succession in 1247, residence at Kassel, partitioned after the death of Landgrave Philip I in 1567.
Hesse-Kassel	Landgraviate	Subdivision of Hesse from 1567, Electorate of Hesse in 1803.
Hesse-Rheinfels	Landgraviate	Subdivision of Hesse from 1567 including the former County of Katzenelnbogen with Burg Rheinfels, line extinct in 1583, fell to Hesse-Kassel.
Hesse-Darmstadt	Landgraviate	Subdivision of Hesse from 1567, Grand Duchy of Hesse in 1806.
Hesse-Marburg	Landgraviate	Subdivision of Hesse from 1567, line extinct in 1604, annexed by Hesse-Darmstadt.
Hesse-Homburg	Landgraviate	Cadet branch of Hesse-Darmstadt from 1622, gained Reichsfreiheit in 1768.
Isenburg-Büdingen-Birstein	County	Subdivision of the County of Isenburg established in 1511 (Oberisenburg), again divided in 1628.
Isenburg-Birstein	County	Subdivision of Isenburg-Büdingen-Birstein from 1628, merged into Isenburg-Offenbach in 1644, restored in 1711, raised to principality in 1744.
Isenburg-Büdingen	County	Subdivision of Isenburg-Büdingen-Birstein from 1628.
Isenburg-Meerholz	County	Split off Isenburg-Büdingen in 1673.
Isenburg-Wächtersbach	County	Split off Isenburg-Büdingen in 1673.
Kaysersberg	Imperial City	(Kaisersberg) Part of the Décapole since 1354.
Königstein	County	Held by the Lords of Eppstein, raised to Reichsgrafen by Emperor Maximilian I of Habsburg in 1505, inherited by Stolberg in 1535, seized by Mainz in 1581.
Kriechingen	County	Former fief of Lorraine around Créhange, raised to Imperial county in 1617, held by the Princes of East Frisia from 1697, to Wied-Runkel in 1726.
Landau	Imperial City	Reichsfreiheit granted by Rudolph I of Habsburg in 1291, seized by the Bishop of Speyer in 1324, restored by Emperor Maximilian I of Habsburg in 1511, joined the Décapole in 1521.
Leiningen-Westerburg	County	Subdivision of the former County of Leiningen since 1317, inherited by the Lords of Westerburg in 1467.
Leiningen-Dagsburg	County	Subdivision of the former County of Leiningen since 1317, raised to principality in 1779.
Lorraine	Duchy	(Lothringen) Former Upper Lotharingia, acquired by René of Anjou, Duke of Bar in 1431, swapped by Duke Francis III of Habsburg-Lorraine for the Grand Duchy of Tuscany in 1735, annexed by France in 1766.
Maurienne	County	Subdivision of the county of Savoy in 1032.
Mensfelden	Lordship	Condominium of Trier and Nassau.
Metz	Prince-Bishopric	Established by 535, Reichsfreiheit confirmed by Charles IV of Luxembourg in 1357, occupied by King Henry II of France in 1552, part of the French Three Bishoprics by the 1648 Peace of Westphalia.
Metz	Imperial City	Since 1189, occupied by King Henry II of France in 1552.
Mulhouse	Imperial City	(Mülhausen) Since about 1268, part of the Décapole since 1354, joined Swiss Confederacy in 1515, France in 1798.
Munster, Haut-Rhin	Imperial City	(Münster ) Reichsfreiheit granted by Emperor Frederick II of Hohenstaufen in 1235, part of the Décapole since 1354.
~~Murbach~~	Imperial Abbey	Principality since 1548, to France in 1680, demolished during the Revolution.
Nassau-Idstein	County	Split off Nassau-Weilburg in 1627, fell to Nassau-Ottweiler in 1721.
Nassau-Saarbrücken	County	3rd Rhenish County, established in 1381, fell to Nassau-Ottweiler in 1723.
Nassau-Ottweiler	County	Split off Nassau-Saarbrücken in 1659, fell to Nassau-Usingen in 1728.
Nassau-Usingen	County	1st Rhenish County, split off Nassau-Saarbrücken in 1659, principality in 1688, Duchy of Nassau from 1806.
Nassau-Weilburg	County	2nd Rhenish County, principality in 1688, Duchy of Nassau from 1806.
Nomeny	Margraviate	Held by the Bishopric of Metz until 1548, margraviate established by Emperor Maximilian II of Habsburg in 1567, to Lorraine in 1612.
Noyers	Lordship	Conferred to Emperor Maximilian I in the Treaty of Arras in 1482. Ceded to France in the Treaty of Noyon in 1516.
Obernai	Imperial City	(Oberehnheim) Since about 1240, part of the Décapole since 1354, annexed by France in 1679.
Odenheim	Provostry	Monastery established in 1122, Imperial college of canons (Reichsstift) since 1494, moved to Bruchsal in 1507.
Olbrück	Lordship	Territory around Olbrück Castle near Niederdürenbach, originally held by Wied.
Orange	Principality	(Oranien) Created in 1033 as the County of Orange. Raised to a principality in 1163. Conceded to the Kingdom of France in 1713.
Palatinate-Simmern	County Palatine	Split off Electoral Palatinate in 1410, inherited Electoral Palatinate in 1559 with 8th vote to the Reichstag.
Palatinate-Lautern	County Palatine	Subdivision of Palatinate from 1576 with 6th vote to the Reichstag.
Palatinate-Veldenz	County Palatine	Former County of Veldenz inherited by Palatinate-Zweibrücken in 1444, 16th vote to the Reichstag
Palatinate-Zweibrücken	County Palatine	Former County of Zweibrücken, in personal union with Palatinate-Simmern until 1459, fell to Palatinate-Birkenfeld in 1734, 14th seat to the Reichstag
Prüm	Prince-Provostry	(Re-)established by King Pepin the Short in 752, Reichsfreiheit granted by Emperor Frederick II of Hohenstaufen in 1222, administered by Trier from 1576, 65th seat to the Reichstag
Reipoltskirchen	Lordship	Since about 1300.
Romont	County	Raised to a county in 1439. Vassal of the Duchy of Savoy. Joined the Free Imperial City of Fribourg after the Bernese conquests in Savoy of 1536.
Rosheim	Imperial City	Since 1303, part of the Décapole since 1354, annexed by France in 1679.
Salm	Principality	Upper Salm since 1165, large parts held by the Wild- and Rhinegraves from 1475 and partitioned in 1499, Salm-Salm raised to princes in 1623 with the 84th seat to the Reichstag.
Salm-Dhaun	County	Subdivision of Salm since 1499, line extinct in 1750, inherited by Salm-Grumbach.
Salm-Grumbach	County	Split off Salm-Dhaun in 1561, annexed by France in 1801.
Salm-Stein-Grehweiler	County	Split off Salm-Grumbach in 1668.
Salm-Salm	County	Split off Salm-Dhaun in 1574, princely county from 1623 as Principality of Salm.
Salm-Kyrburg	County	Subdivision of Salm from 1499, residence at Kirn, princely county from 1743, Principality of Salm from 1802.
Savoy	Duchy	(Savoyen) Former county, part of the Kingdom of Burgundy inherited by Emperor Conrad II in 1032, Reichsfreiheit granted by Emperor Charles IV of Luxembourg in 1361, raised to duchy in 1416.
Sayn-Wittgenstein	County	Former Counts of Sayn, a cadet branch of the House of Sponheim, acquired County of Wittgenstein in 1361, partitioned in 1607.
Sayn-Wittgenstein-Berleburg	County	14th Rhenish County. Subdivision of Sayn-Wittgenstein from 1607.
Sayn-Wittgenstein-Wittgenstein	County	15th Rhenish County. Subdivision of Sayn-Wittgenstein from 1607, Sayn-Wittgenstein-Hohenstein from 1657.
Sélestat	Imperial City	(Schlettstadt) Reichsfreiheit granted by Frederick II of Hohenstaufen in 1216, part of the Décapole since 1354.
Solms-Braunfels	County	Subdivision of Solms since 1258, raised to principality in 1742.
Solms-Lich	County	Subdivision of Solms(-Braunfels) since 1409, Solms-Hohensolms-Lich from 1544, raised to principality in 1792.
Solms-Laubach	County	Subdivision of Solms-Lich from 1544.
Solms-Rödelheim	County	Subdivision of Solms-Laubach from 1607, Solms-Rödelheim-Assenheim from 1635.
Speyer	Prince-Bishopric	Established before 614, Reichsfreiheit granted around 969 by Emperor Otto I, 19th seat to the Reichstag
Speyer	Imperial City	5th Rhenish City. City rights acknowledged by the Speyer bishops in 1294, venue of 50 Reichstag assemblies, including the Diet of Speyer (1529) (Protestation at Speyer).
Sponheim	County	Established in the 11th century by the Rhenish House of Sponheim, held jointly by the Margraves of Baden and the House of Palatinate-Simmern since 1437.
Strasbourg	Prince-Bishopric	(Straßburg) Established in the 4th century, prince-bishopric since 982; 21st seat to the Reichstag
Strasbourg	Imperial City	(Straßburg) Since 1262. Ceded to France in 1681
Tarentaise	Prince-Bishopric	Established in the 10th century, prince-bishopric since 1186.
Toul	Prince-Bishopric	(Tull) Established in 365 by Saint Mansuetus, Reichsfreiheit confirmed by King Henry I in 928, occupied by King Henry II of France in 1552, part of the French Three Bishoprics by the 1648 Peace of Westphalia.
Toul	Imperial City	(Tull) Since the 13th century (Tull), occupied by King Henry II of France in 1552.
Turckheim	Imperial City	(Türkheim) Since 1312, part of the Décapole since 1354.
Vaud	Barony	(Waadt) Established in 1234. Incorporated into the House of Savoy in 1359. Annexed by the Canton of Bern in 1536.
Verdun	Prince-Bishopric	(Wirten) Established about 346, Reichsfreiheit confirmed by Emperor Otto III in 997, occupied by King Henry II of France in 1552, part of the French Three Bishoprics by the 1648 Peace of Westphalia.
Verdun	Imperial City	Since the 12th century (Wirten), occupied by King Henry II of France in 1552.
Villars	County	Originally a Lordship. Raised to a county in 1497. Raised to a Marquisate in 1565. Raised to a Duchy in 1705.
Waldeck	County	Line established about 1180, Reichsfreiheit granted by King Wenceslaus of Luxembourg in 1379, Waldeck-Pyrmont from 1625, raised to principality in 1712.
Wartenberg	County	Established in 1232, inherited by Riedesel in 1428, Freiherren from 1680.
Wetterau	County	Established c. 950, held by the counts von Wetter-Tegerfelden in 1317
Weissenburg	Imperial City	Since 1306, part of the Décapole since 1354, annexed by France in 1648.
Weissenburg	Prince-Provostry	Abbey established about 660 by the Bishopric of Speyer, Reichsfreiheit granted by Emperor Otto II in 967, again held by Speyer from 1546, 63th seat to the Reichstag.
Wetzlar	Imperial City	14th Rhenish City, Reichsfreiheit granted by Emperor Frederick Barbarossa in 1180.
Wild- and Rhinegraves	County	Rhinegraves since the 12th century, inherited Wildgraviate at Kyrburg in 1409, acquired (Upper) Salm in 1475.
Worms	Prince-Bishopric	Established about 614; 15th seat to the Reichstag
Worms	Imperial City	4th Rhenish City, Reichsfreiheit granted by Emperor Frederick Barbarossa in 1184.

== Sources ==
- The list of states making up the Upper Rhenish Circle is based in part on that in the German Wikipedia article Oberrheinischer Reichskreis.
