= Berchtesgaden Provostry =

Monastery in Bavaria, Germany

Coordinates: 47°38′00″N 13°00′13″E

(Prince-)Provostry of Berchtesgaden (Fürst-)Propstei Berchtesgaden (German)
- 1194–1803
- Coat of arms

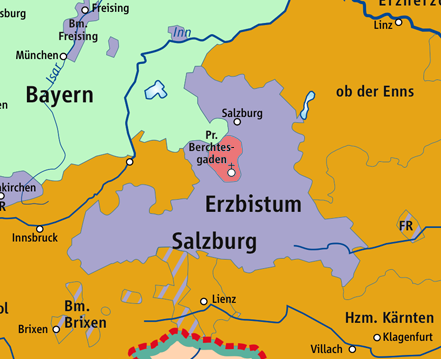
- Berchtesgaden Provostry and Archbishopric of Salzburg, 1789
- Status: Imperial Abbey
- Capital: Berchtesgaden
- Common languages: Central Bavarian
- Religion: Roman Catholic
- Government: Principality
- Historical era: Middle Ages
  - Provostry founded: 1102
  - Imperial immediacy: 1194
  - Joined Bavarian Circle: 1500
  - Prince-Provostry: 1559
  - Mediatised to Salzburg: 1803
  - Joined Kingdom of Bavaria: 1806
Preceded by	Succeeded by
Duchy of Bavaria	Electorate of Salzburg

Berchtesgaden Provostry or the Prince-Provostry of Berchtesgaden (German: Fürstpropstei Berchtesgaden) was an immediate (reichsunmittelbar) principality of the Holy Roman Empire, held by a canonry (a collegiate foundation of Canons Regular) led by a Prince-Provost.

== Geography ==
The territory comprised the Alpine Berchtesgaden hollow, namely the modern communities of Berchtesgaden, Bischofswiesen, Marktschellenberg, Ramsau and Schönau am Königssee, located in the present-day German state of Bavaria, as well as a number of estates further afield.

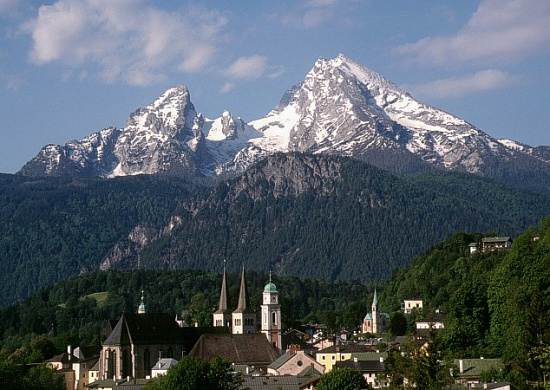
Berchtesgaden and Watzmann massif

The location of the monastery was strategically important. Firstly, it is in an area possessing immensely valuable salt deposits, and was situated in such a way that it was able to act as a buffer state between its much larger neighbours, the Duchy of Bavaria and the Archbishopric of Salzburg, and to make this situation work to its advantage. Secondly, the Berchtesgaden valley is almost entirely enclosed by high mountains, except for a single point of access to the north, and is thus virtually impregnable.

== History ==
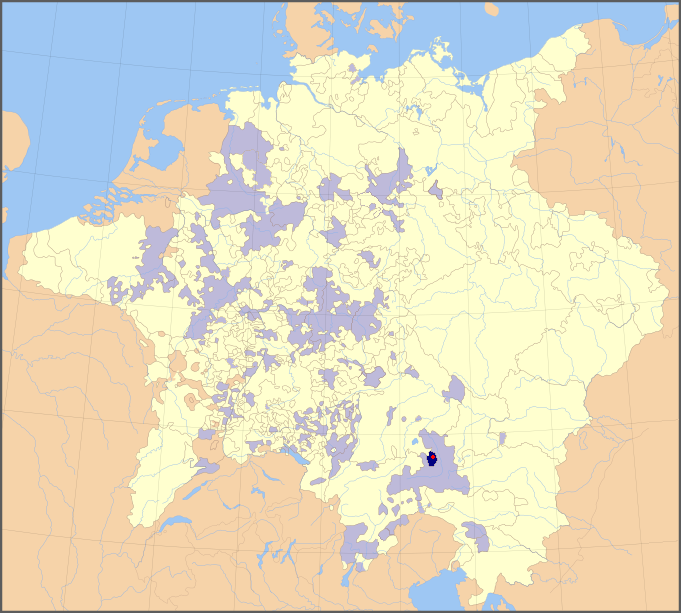

The Berchtesgaden monastery, dedicated to Saint Peter and Saint John the Baptist, was founded in 1102 within the Bavarian stem duchy as a community of Augustinian Canons by Count Berengar of Sulzbach under the directions of the will of his mother, the late Countess Irmgard.

In view of the favourable geopolitical circumstances, the provosts had little difficulty in establishing the territorial independence of the monastery, which became an Imperial abbey in 1194. In 1380 the provosts achieved the status of an ecclesiastical Reichsfürst and from 1559 held a direct vote in the Reichstag assembly as "Prince-Provosts", a rank almost equivalent to that of a Prince-Bishop. The title was one of only two within the Empire: the only other one was at the Swabian Imperial Ellwangen Abbey.

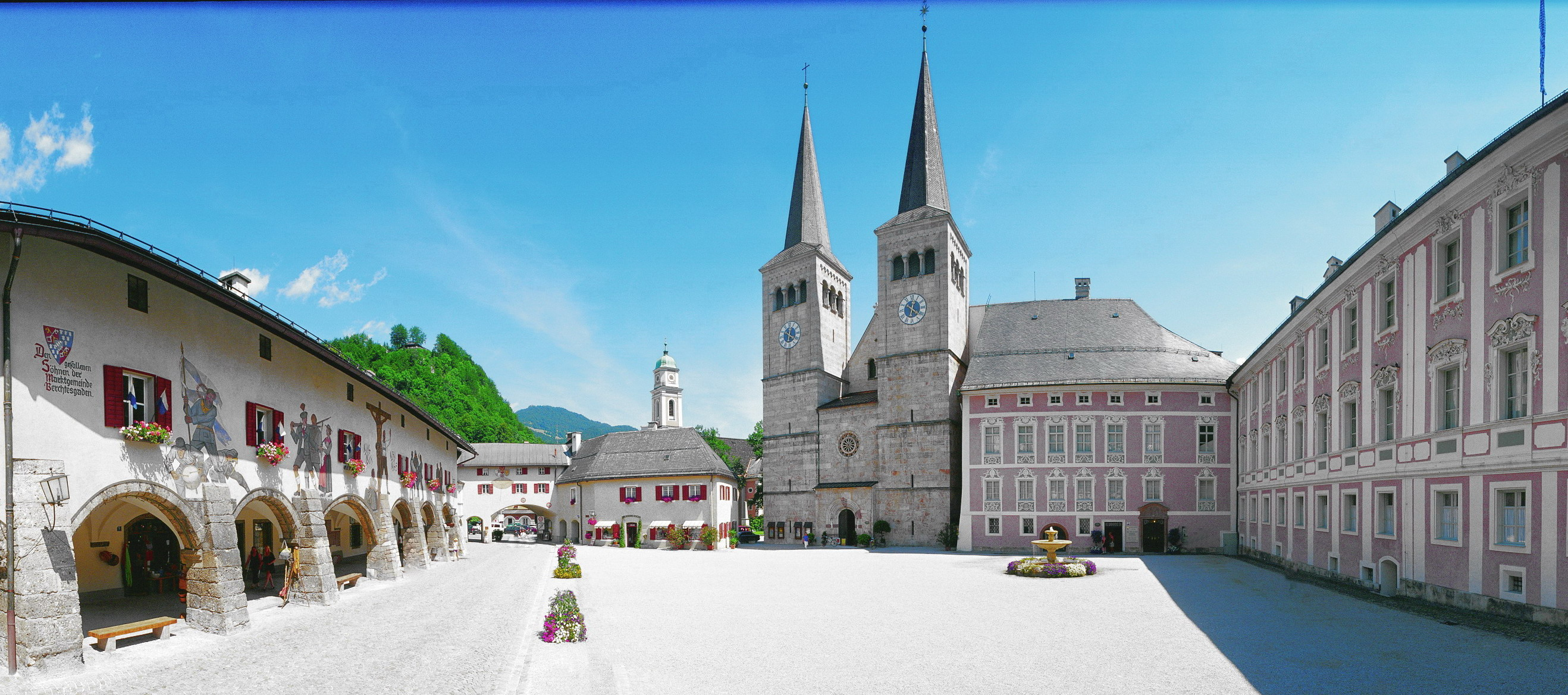
Monastery church and Wittelsbach palace

The position of Prince-Provost was frequently held in conjunction with other high ecclesiastical positions, and the provosts often lived elsewhere. From 1594 until 1723, the title and territories were held by the House of Wittelsbach, from 1612 in personal union by the Prince-Archbishops of Cologne, whose cousins ruled over the neighbouring Bavarian duchy. The constant avarice of the archbishops of Salzburg led to clashes of arms in 1611, when the troops of Wolf Dietrich Raitenau occupied Berchtesgaden but were repulsed by the forces of Duke Maximilian I of Bavaria.

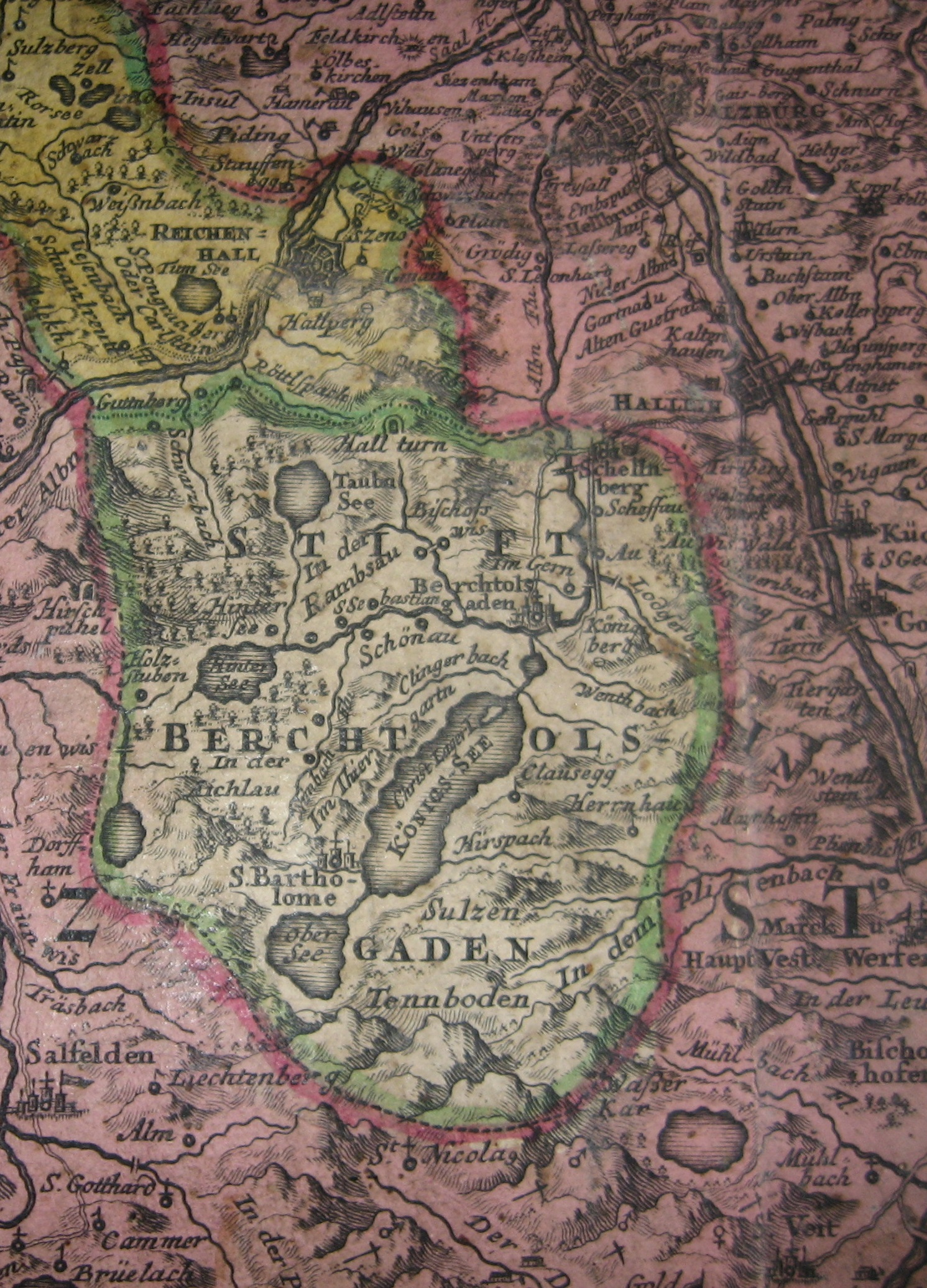
Berchtesgaden, c. 1715

In 1802/1803 the provostry and its territories were secularised and mediatised first to the short-lived Electorate of Salzburg, which according to the 1805 Peace of Pressburg fell to the Austrian Empire, and finally in 1810 to the newly established Kingdom of Bavaria. The monastic buildings were used for a while as a barracks, but in 1818 the monastery was designated as a royal residence of the Wittelsbachs, who used it as a summer palace.

Following the end of the Bavarian monarchy, the buildings have been administered since 1923 by the Wittelsbach Compensation Fund (Wittelsbacher Ausgleichsfonds). Some of the rooms are open to the public, while other parts of the building are still used by the Wittelsbachs. The monastic church now serves as the parish church of Berchtesgaden.

== Provosts and Prince-Provosts of Berchtesgaden ==
- Eberwin 1111-1142
- Hugo I 1142-1148
- Heinrich I 1148-1174, Anti-Archbishop of Salzburg 1174-1177, Bishop of Brixen 1177-1195
- Dietrich 1174-1178
- Friedrich I 1178-1188
- Bernhard I of Schönstätten 1188-1201
- Gerhard 1201
- Hugo II 1201-1210
- Konrad Garrer 1210-1211
- Friedrich II Ellinger 1211-1217
- Heinrich II 1217-1231
- Friedrich III of Ortenburg 1231-1239
- Bernhard II 1239-1252
- Konrad II 1252
- Heinrich III 1252-1257
- Konrad III von Medling 1257-1283
- Johann I Sachs von Sachsenau 1283-1303, Prince-Bishop of Brixen 1302-1306
- Hartung von Wildon 1303-1306
- Eberhard Sachs von Sachsenau 1306-1316
- Konrad IV Tanner 1316-1333
- Heinrich IV von Inzing 1333-1351
- Reinhold Zeller 1351-1355
- Otto Tanner 1355-1357
- Peter I Pfaffinger 1357-1362
- Jakob I von Vansdorf 1362-1368
- Greimold Wulp 1368-1377
- Ulrich I Wulp 1377-1384 concurrently with
- Sieghard Waller 1381-1384
- Konrad V Thorer von Thörlein 1384-1393, Bishop of Lavant 1397-1406
- Pilgrim von Puchheim 1393-1396, also Prince-Archbishop of Salzburg since 1365
- Gregorius Schenk von Osterwitz 1396-1403, also Prince-Archbishop of Salzburg
- Berthold von Wehingen 1404, Anti-Archbishop of Salzburg 1404-1406
- Peter II Pienzenauer 1404-1432
- Johann II Praun 1432-1446
- Bernhard III Leuprechtinger 1446-1473
- Erasmus Pretschlaiffer 1473-1486
- Ulrich II Pernauer 1486-1496
- Balthasar Hirschauer 1496-1508
- Gregor Rainer 1508-1522
- Wolfgang I Lenberger 1523-1541
- Wolfgang II Griestätter 1541-1567 (created Prince-Provost in 1559)
- Jakob II Putrich 1567-1594
- Ferdinand of Bavaria 1594-1650, also Archbishop of Cologne from 1612
- Maximilian Heinrich of Bavaria 1650-1688, also Archbishop of Cologne
- Joseph Clemens of Bavaria 1688-1723, also Archbishop of Cologne
- Julius Heinrich von Rehlingen-Radau 1723-1732
- Cajetan Anton von Notthaft 1732-1752
- Michael Balthasar von Christalnigg 1752-1768
- Franz Anton Joseph von Hausen-Gleichenstorff 1768-1780
- Joseph Konrad von Schroffenberg-Mös 1780-1803, also Prince-Bishop of Freising 1789-1803, resigned

== See also ==
- Berchtesgadener Land
