= Berchtesgadener Land =

Coordinates: 47°44′N 12°53′E

- District
- Flag Coat of arms
- Country: Germany
- State: Bavaria
- Adm. region: Upper Bavaria
- Capital: Bad Reichenhall

Government
  - District admin.: Bernhard Kern (CSU)

Area
  - Total: 840 km^{2} (320 sq mi)

Population (31 December 2024)
  - Total: 105,292
  - Density: 130/km^{2} (320/sq mi)
- Time zone: UTC+01:00 (CET)
  - Summer (DST): UTC+02:00 (CEST)
- Vehicle registration: BGD, BGL, LF, REI
- Website: berchtesgadener-land.de

Berchtesgadener Land (Central Bavarian: Berchtsgoana Land) is a Landkreis (district) in Bavaria, Germany. It is bounded by the district of Traunstein and by the Austrian state of Salzburg.

== History ==
=== Middle Ages and early modern era ===
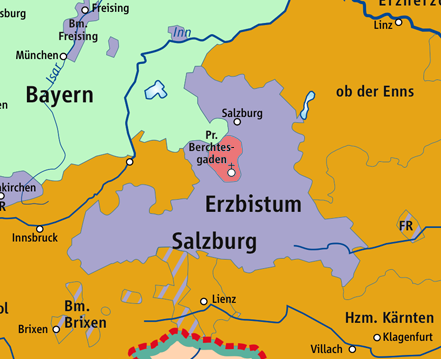
The Prince-Archbishopric of Salzburg (violet) and Berchtesgaden Provostry (pale red) c. 1789

The southern alpine regions were part of the stem duchy of Bavaria from the early Middle Ages. The 11th and 12th centuries saw the founding of numerous mountain villages. One of these settlements was Berchtesgaden, which later assumed a more dominant role in the administrative district that now bears its name.

The northern portion of the Salzach river valley was traditionally part of the Prince-Archbishopric of Salzburg (an imperial principality ruled by the archbishop of Salzburg), while Berchtesgaden itself was the seat of the Berchtesgaden Provostry (a principality ruled by a Prince-Provost) comprising roughly the modern municipalities of Berchtesgaden, Bischofswiesen, Marktschellenberg, Ramsau and Schönau am Königssee.

These states existed from the Middle Ages until the early 19th century, and functioned as buffers between Bavaria and Austria. However, like the rest of the Holy Roman Empire, the Napoleonic Wars brought about significant changes to the political makeup of the region. In 1803, Salzburg was secularised and became the short-lived Electorate of Salzburg, and Berchtesgaden was mediatized to (incorporated into) this new state. In 1805, Salzburg was itself mediatized to Austria, but was ceded to Bavaria in 1809. In the 1816 Treaty of Munich most of Salzburg was returned to Austria becoming the Duchy of Salzburg in 1850 and ultimately the modern Austrian state of Salzburg (with the westernmost portions becoming part of the County of Tyrol). However, the land of the former Berchtesgaden Provostry and the former Salzburg land west of the Salzach and Saalach rivers remained part of Bavaria. The modern Berchtesgadener Land is mostly made up from sections of this land, except the area around Bad Reichenhall, which had been part of Bavaria for centuries; the rest lies in adjoining areas in eastern Traunstein and a small area of southern Altötting.

=== Recent history ===
The Berchtesgadener Land was formed in 1972 through a merger of the district of Berchtesgaden, the district of Laufen, and the city of Bad Reichenhall.

Two important historical events have dramatically reshaped Berchtesgadener Land in recent years, namely Austria's signing of the Schengen treaty in 1990 and the introduction of the Euro in 2002 in both Germany and Austria. Municipalities on both sides of the border have been brought much closer by these changes, and the area is reversing many of the effects caused by the split of 1816. There is close and mutually beneficial cooperation in areas such as public transport, recreational sports, and culture. There is even a cross-border radio station called "Radio Untersberg" (website), which would have been unimaginable some 20 years ago due to different government regulations.

Salzburg has gradually asserted a new role as an economic, educational, and cultural center of the area, which has had a ripple effect through several municipalities such as Freilassing, which have traditionally defined themselves as German border towns.

== Geography ==
This district comprises the southeastern tip of Bavaria. It consists of a high alpine countryside in the south, with mountains rising to more than 2500 m, and of a strip along the Saalach River. The city of Salzburg (Austria) is located on the opposite side of the Saalach, across from the town of Freilassing.

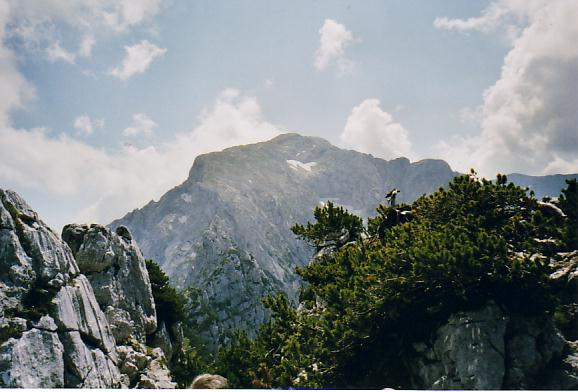
Berchtesgadener Land

The very south is occupied by the Berchtesgaden National Park (210 km^{2}) comprising the Watzmann massif (2713 m) and the Königssee, a lake of 5.2 km^{2} surrounded by majestic mountains.

== Coat of arms ==
The coat of arms displays:

- the heraldic lion of Salzburg, representing the northern districts which were once subjects of Salzburg
- the keys of Saint Peter, the patron saint of the Berchtesgaden Provostry
- the white and blue lozenge-pattern (Rautenflagge) of Bavaria (one of the two flags of Bavaria)

== Towns and municipalities ==
Clickable map of towns and municipalities in the district

Towns
1. Bad Reichenhall
2. Freilassing
3. Laufen
Municipalities
1. Ainring
2. Anger
3. Bayerisch Gmain
4. Berchtesgaden
5. Bischofswiesen
6. Marktschellenberg

7. Piding
8. Ramsau
9. Saaldorf-Surheim
10. Schneizlreuth
11. Schönau am Königssee
12. Teisendorf

== See also ==
- Austria–Germany border
