= Schönau am Königssee =

- Municipality
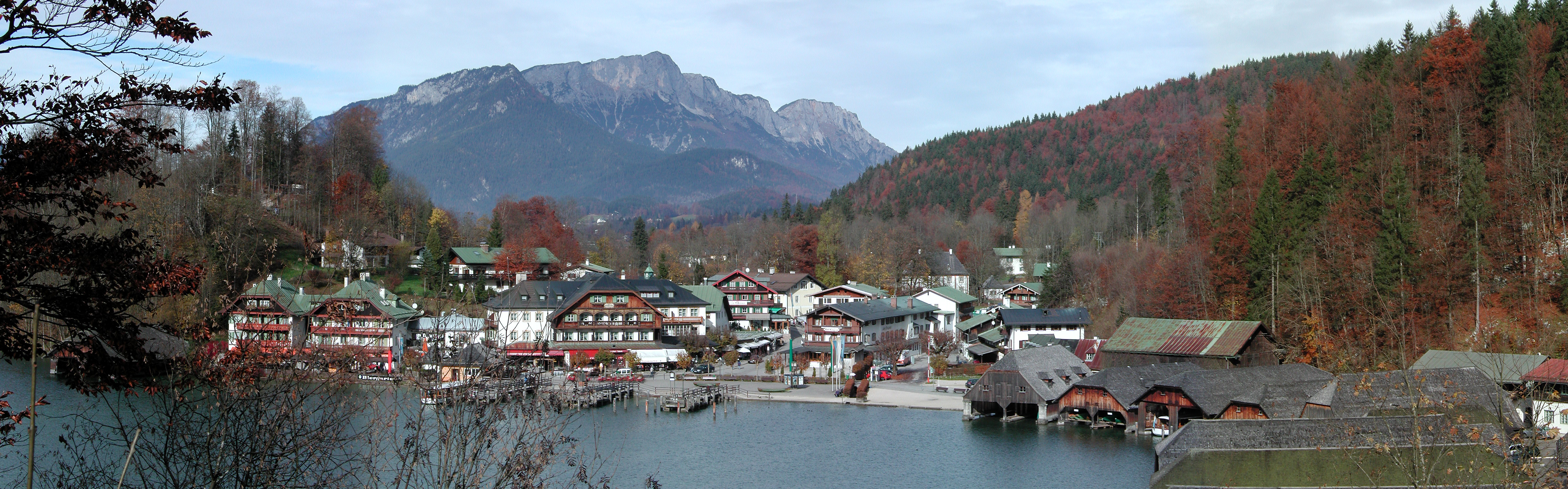
- View of Königssee harbor

- Coat of arms

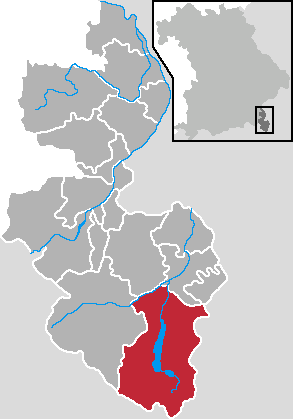
- Location of Schönau am Königssee within Berchtesgadener Land district
- Interactive map of Schönau am Königssee
- Location within Germany Location within Bavaria
- Coordinates: 47°35′N 12°59′E
- Country: Germany
- State: Bavaria
- Admin. region: Oberbayern
- District: Berchtesgadener Land

Government
  - Mayor (2020–26): Hannes Rasp (CSU)

Area
  - Total: 131.65 km^{2} (50.83 sq mi)
- Elevation: 630 m (2,070 ft)

Population (2025-12-31)
  - Total: 5,278
  - Density: 40.09/km^{2} (103.8/sq mi)
- Time zone: UTC+01:00 (CET)
  - Summer (DST): UTC+02:00 (CEST)
- Postal codes: 83471
- Dialling codes: 08652
- Vehicle registration: BGL
- Website: www.koenigssee.de

Schönau am Königssee is a municipality in the district of Berchtesgadener Land in the German state of Bavaria. It is located at the northern end of the Königssee lake.

== Geography ==
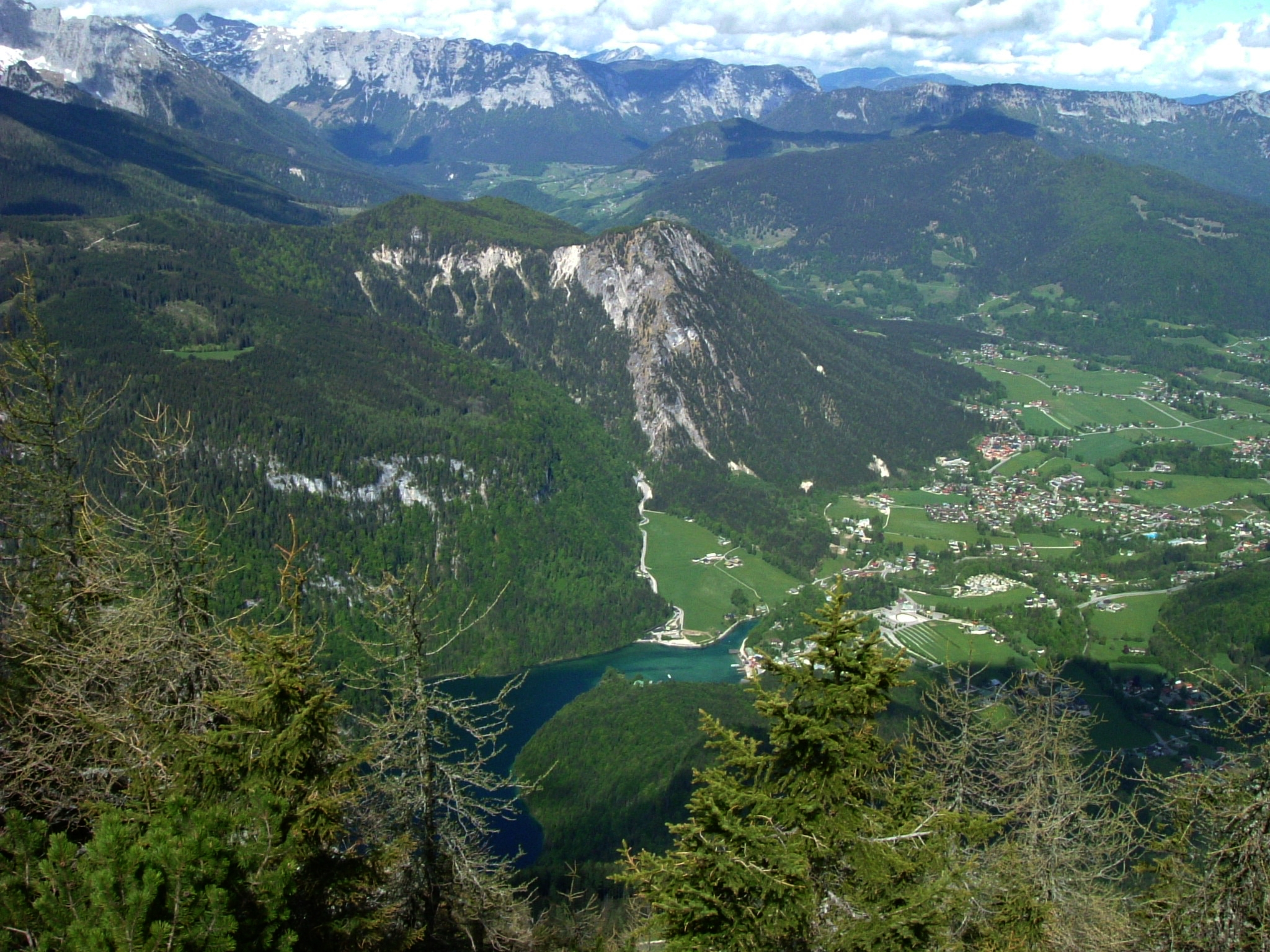
View from Mt. Jenner

Schönau is surrounded by the Berchtesgaden Alps; it is the southeasternmost German municipality, bordering on the Austrian state of Salzburg at the Hoher Göll massif and the Steinernes Meer range. The present-day commune was formed in 1978 by the merger of the former Schönau and Königssee municipalities. Since 1984, the municipal area also comprises the formerly unincorporated Königssee lake, the famous St. Bartholomew's Church and the surrounding mountains from the east face of the Watzmann peak up to the Austrian border in the south, including the eastern part of Berchtesgaden National Park. From the lake, the Königsseer Ache creek runs down to Berchtesgaden.

Due to its picturesque setting, Schönau largely depends on tourism. It is home to a bobsleigh, luge, and skeleton track that is the oldest permanent track in the world, having been constructed in 1968. Passenger services along the lake from Schönau are operated by the Bayerische Seenschifffahrt company using electric boats.

== History ==
Schönau was first mentioned in a 1456 deed, then one of the eight historic localities (Gnotschaften) of the Berchtesgaden Provostry. After the secularisation of the Prince-Provostry, Schönau finally fell to the Kingdom of Bavaria in 1810.

== Notable people ==
- Anton Adner (1705?-1822), peddler and supercentenarian
- Magda Schneider (1909–1996), actress, lived and died in Schönau; her daughter Romy Schneider (1938–1982) was raised here
- Georg Leber (1920–2012), politician, lived and died in Schönau
- Hilde Gerg (born 1975), alpine skier, lives in Schönau
- Felix Loch (born 1989), 2010 & 2014 Olympic luge gold medalist, lives in Schönau
- Rupert Staudinger (born 1997), competed for the UK luge team in the 2018 Olympics, grew up in Schönau
