= Adner =

Adner may refer to:

- Anton Adner
- Zohar Adner
- Adner, Virginia
