= Bavarian Circle =

Imperial circle of the Holy Roman Empire

Bavarian Circle Bayerischer Reichskreis
- Imperial circle of the Holy Roman Empire
- 1500–1806
- The Bavarian Circle as at the beginning of the 16th century within the Holy Roman Empire
- Capital: Regensburg
- Historical era: Early modern period
  - Established: 1500
  - Disestablished: 1806
- Today part of: Austria: ∟Salzburg; ∟Tirol; ∟Upper Austria; Germany: ∟Bavaria; Slovenia

The Bavarian Circle (German: Bayerischer Reichskreis) was an imperial circle of the Holy Roman Empire. The most significant state by far in the circle was the Duchy of Bavaria (raised to an Electorate by Emperor Ferdinand II in 1623) with the Upper Palatinate territories. Other Imperial Estates like the Prince-Archbishopric of Salzburg, the Prince-Bishoprics of Freising, Passau and Regensburg as well as the imperial city of Regensburg, seat of the Imperial Diet from 1663, had a secondary importance. The elector of Bavaria and the archbishop of Salzburg acted as the circle's directors.

== Composition ==
The circle was made up of the following states:

Name	Type of entity	Established	Comments
Bavaria	Duchy	907	Established in 907, held by the House of Wittelsbach from 1180, Bavaria-Munich and Bavaria-Landshut reunited in 1506, annexed the Upper Palatinate from the Electoral Palatinate in 1628 along with the electoral dignity, inherited as a whole by the Electorate of the Palatinate in 1777; 2nd seat to the Reichstag
Berchtesgaden	Prince-Provostry	1111	Established in 1111, Reichsfreiheit granted by Frederick I Barbarossa in 1156, 61st seat to the Reichstag
Breitenegg	Lordship	1624	Granted to Johann Tserclaes de Tilly by Elector Maximilian I of Bavaria in 1624, Imperial county from 1654, sold to Bavaria in 1792.
Ehrenfels	Lordship	1465	Territory around Beratzhausen, Reichsfreiheit granted by Frederick III of Habsburg in 1465, acquired by Palatinate-Neuburg in 1567.
Freising	Prince-Bishopric	724	Established by Saint Corbinian in 724, Prince-Bishopric from 1294, 31th seat to the Reichstag
Haag	County	1245	Reichsfreiheit granted by Frederick II of Hohenstaufen in 1245, Imperial county from 1509, held by the Dukes of Bavaria from 1567.
Hohenwaldeck	Lordship	1476	Former Freising territory, Reichsfreiheit granted by Frederick III of Habsburg in 1476, county from 1637, to Bavaria in 1734
Leuchtenberg	Landgraviate	1146	Principality from 1433, inherited by the House of Wittelsbach in 1646, to Bavaria in 1712, 72nd seat to the Reichstag.
Lobkowitz	Principality	1562	Störnstein was a fief of the Bohemian Crown raised to county and granted to the House of Lobkowicz by Emperor Ferdinand I in 1562, gained Reichsfreiheit in 1641 with the 83th seat to the Reichstag.
Niedermünster in Regensburg	Prince-Abbacy	788	Established about 788, Reichsfreiheit granted by Henry II in 1002, 15th Prelatess of the Rhine.
Obermünster in Regensburg	Prince-Abbacy	876	Established before 876, Reichsfreiheit granted by Louis IV of Wittelsbach in 1315, 16th Prelatess of the Rhine.
Ortenburg	County	1120	Established about 1120, Reichsfreiheit confirmed in 1479 by Frederick III of Habsburg, 24th County of Wetterau
Palatinate-Neuburg	Duchy	1505	Wittelsbach territory established in 1505 after the Landshut War of Succession, inherited the Palatinate in 1685, line extinct in 1742, inherited by Palatinate-Sulzbach with 10th vote to the Reichstag
Palatinate-Sulzbach	Duchy	1656	Subdivision of Palatinate-Neuburg from 1656, heir of Palatinate-Neuburg and Electoral Palatinate in 1742, both united with Bavaria in 1777.
Passau	Prince-Bishopric	739	Established in 739 by Saint Boniface, Reichsfreiheit granted by Otto III in 999.
Regensburg	Prince-Bishopric	739	Established in 739 by Saint Boniface, Imperial immediacy from the 13th century, 33th seat to the Reichstag
Regensburg	Imperial City	1245	Since 1245, 1st Swabian City
Salzburg	Prince-Archbishopric	696	Bishopric established in 696 by Saint Rupert, archbishopric from 798, prince-archbishopric from 1213 with the 5th seat to the Reichstag. Secularised and transferred to the Austrian Circle in 1803
St Emmeram in Regensburg	Prince-Abbacy	739	Established in 739, held by the Bishops of Regensburg until 975, Reichsfreiheit granted by Adolph of Nassau in 1295, 9th Prelate of the Rhine.
Sulzbürg-Pyrbaum	Lordship	1353	Held by the House of Wolfstein, Reichsfreiheit confirmed in 1353, county from 1673, fell to Bavaria in 1740.
