= Saaldorf-Surheim =

- Municipality
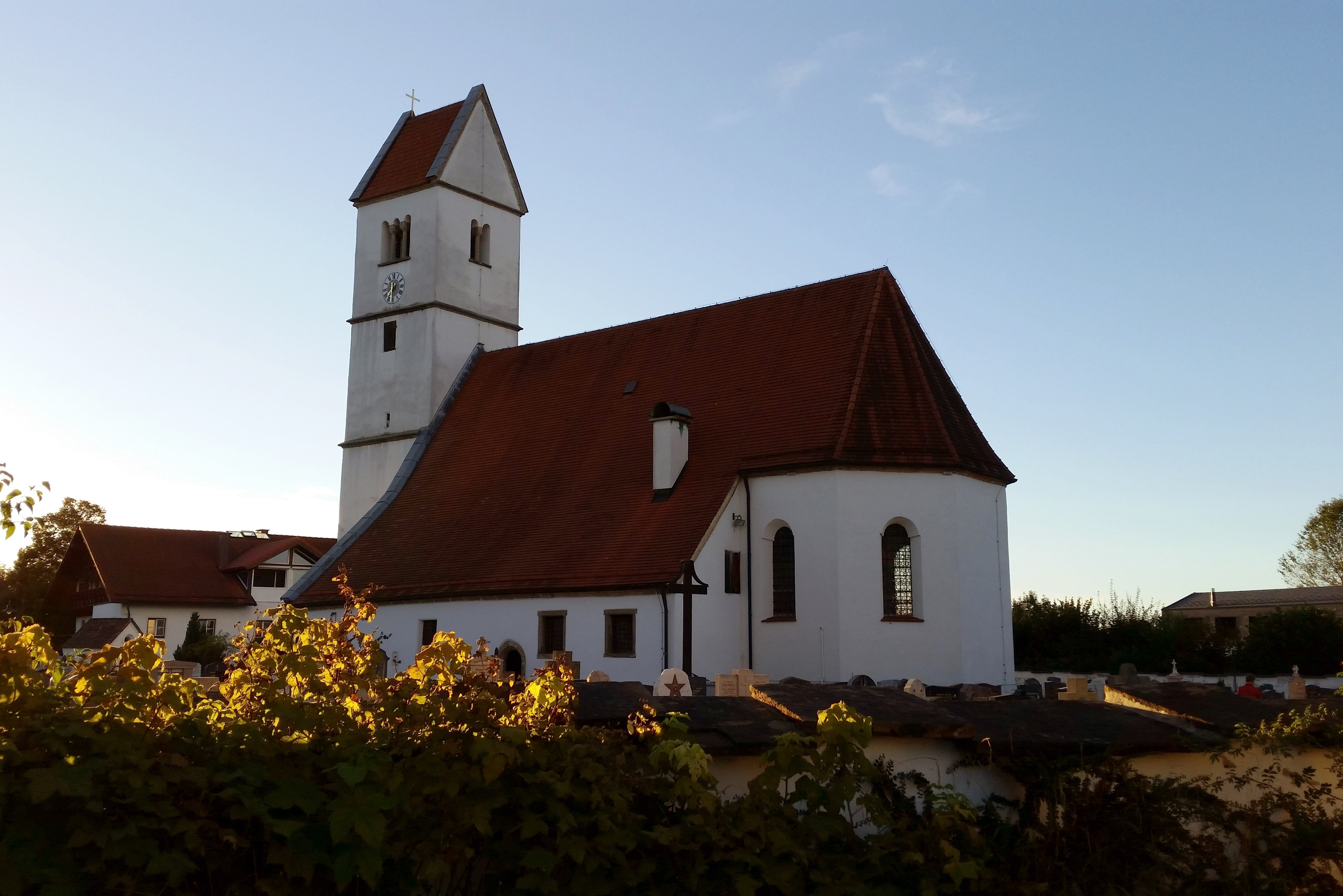
- Saint Stephen Church in Surheim

- Coat of arms

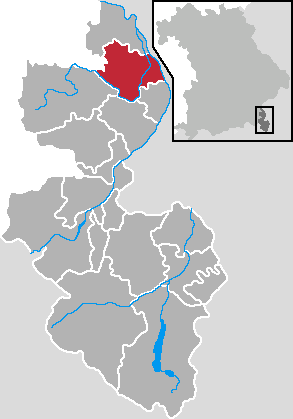
- Location of Saaldorf-Surheim within Berchtesgadener Land district
- Interactive map of Saaldorf-Surheim
- Location within Germany Location within Bavaria
- Coordinates: 47°53′N 12°57′E
- Country: Germany
- State: Bavaria
- Admin. region: Oberbayern
- District: Berchtesgadener Land

Government
  - Mayor (2020–26): Andreas Buchwinkler

Area
  - Total: 39.09 km^{2} (15.09 sq mi)
- Elevation: 449 m (1,473 ft)

Population (2025-12-31)
  - Total: 5,568
  - Density: 142.4/km^{2} (368.9/sq mi)
- Time zone: UTC+01:00 (CET)
  - Summer (DST): UTC+02:00 (CEST)
- Postal codes: 83416
- Dialling codes: 08654, 08682, 08666
- Vehicle registration: BGL, LF
- Website: www.saaldorf-surheim.de

Saaldorf-Surheim is a municipality in the district of Berchtesgadener Land in Bavaria, Germany.
