= Marktschellenberg =

- Municipality
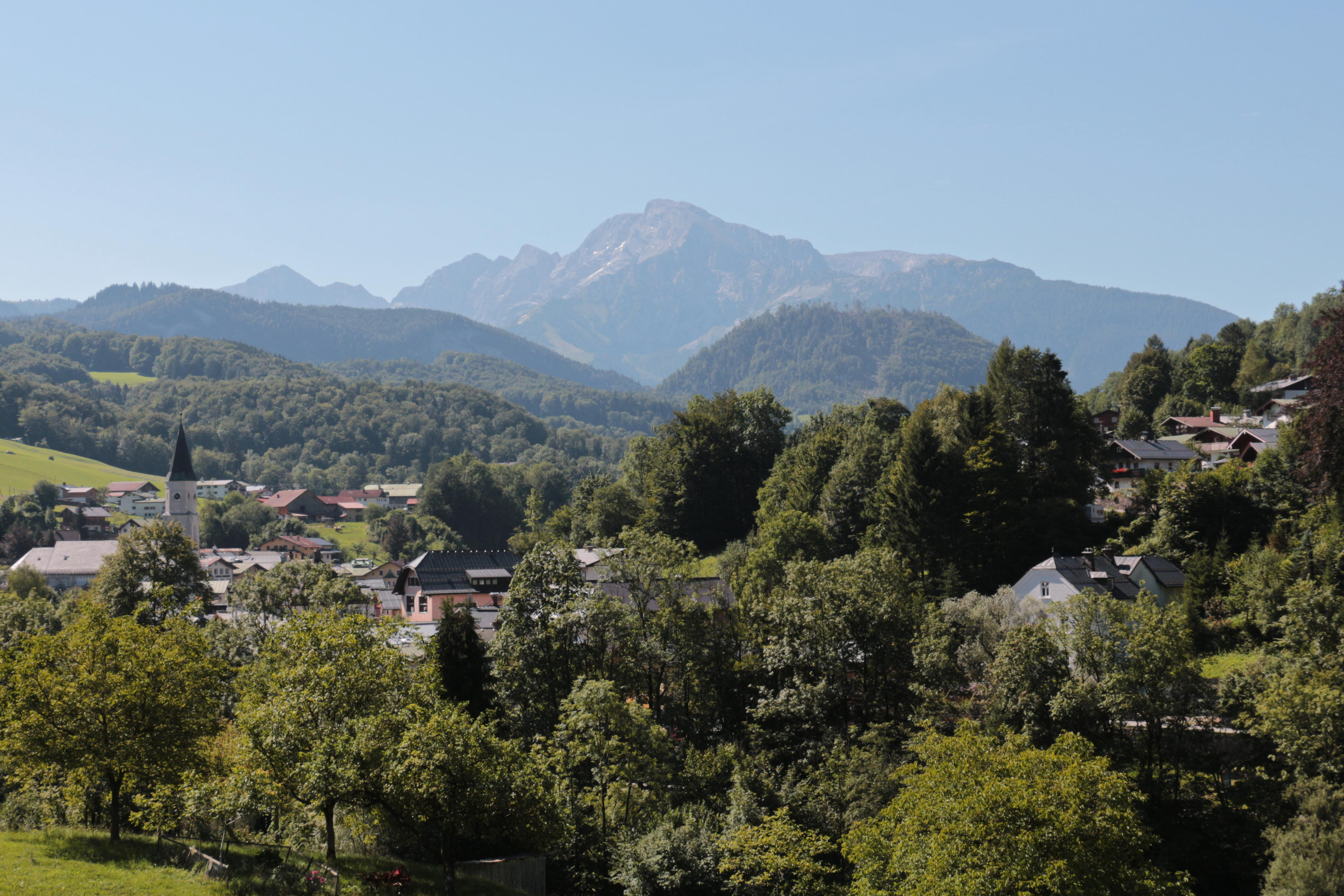
- Marktschellenberg seen from the north

- Coat of arms

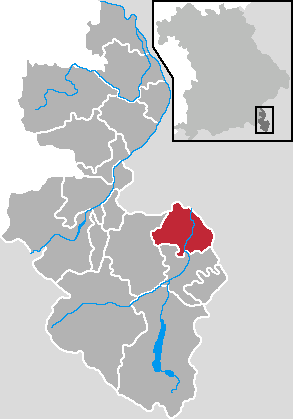
- Location of Marktschellenberg within Berchtesgadener Land district
- Interactive map of Marktschellenberg
- Location within Germany Location within Bavaria
- Coordinates: 47°42′N 13°1′E
- Country: Germany
- State: Bavaria
- Admin. region: Oberbayern
- District: Berchtesgadener Land

Government
  - Mayor (2020–26): Michael Ernst

Area
  - Total: 17.66 km^{2} (6.82 sq mi)
- Elevation: 503 m (1,650 ft)

Population (2025-12-31)
  - Total: 1,703
  - Density: 96.43/km^{2} (249.8/sq mi)
- Time zone: UTC+01:00 (CET)
  - Summer (DST): UTC+02:00 (CEST)
- Postal codes: 83487
- Dialling codes: 08650
- Vehicle registration: BGL
- Website: www.marktschellenberg.de

Marktschellenberg is a municipality in the district of Berchtesgadener Land in Bavaria in Germany.

== Notable people ==
- Franz Pfnür (1908-1996), Alpine skier
- Karl Bartos (born 1952), Percussionist of electronic music pioneers Kraftwerk
