= Anton Adner =

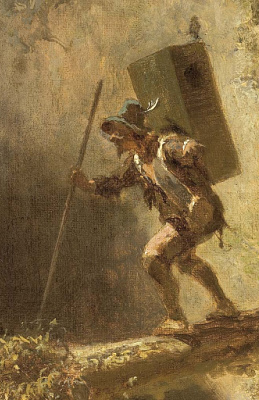
Anton Adner by Carl Spitzweg

Anton Adner (1705? – 15 March 1822), also known as the Bavarian Methusalem, was a Bavarian artisan of wood, who reportedly is one of the oldest people to have lived in that region of Germany.

== Life ==
Anton Adner was born in 1705, either in Schönau - where his residence was - or in the Tyrol, from whence Adner would have come after the birth of his child. Adner's nickname was Danei.

== Selling wooden boxes ==
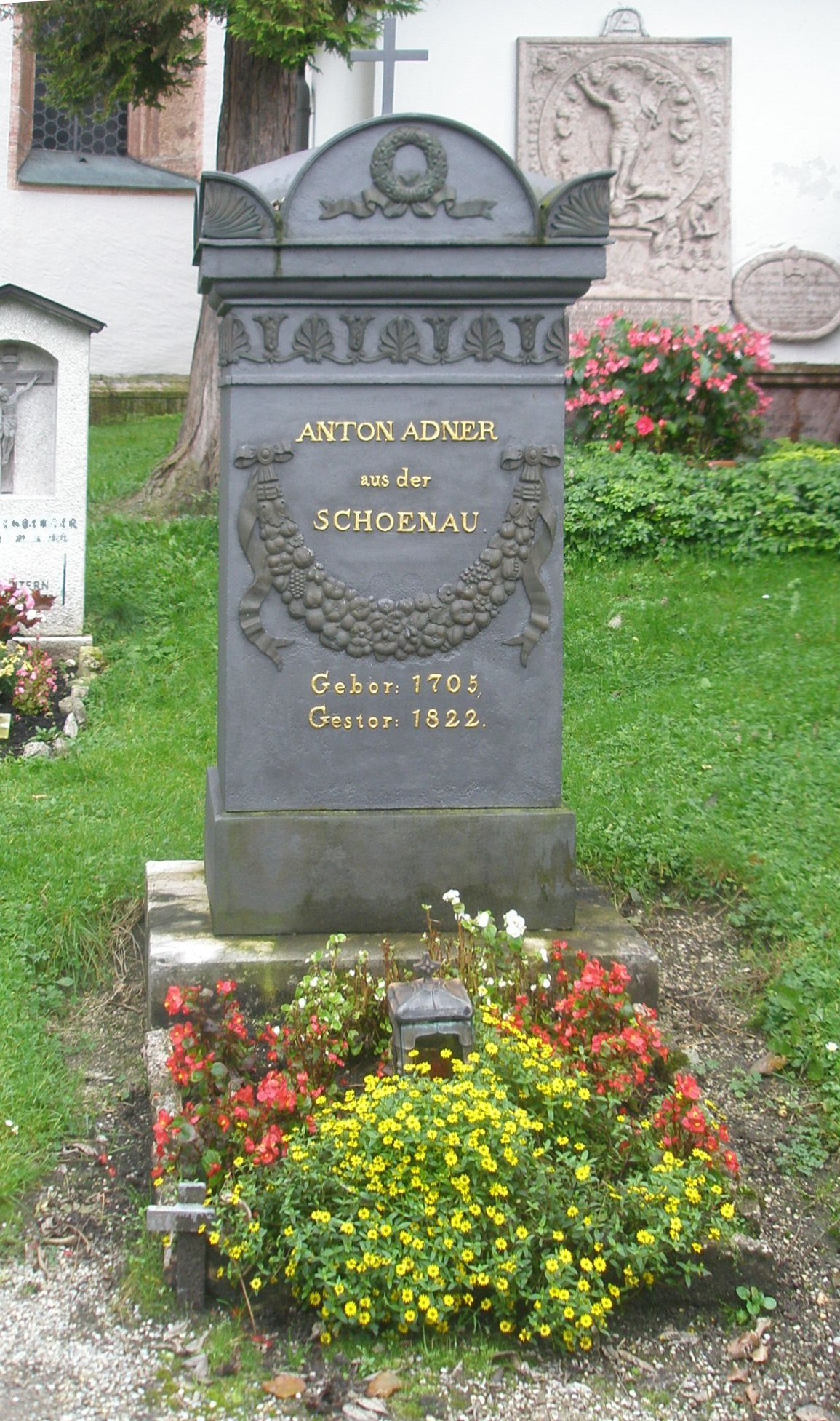
Grave marker of Anton Adner

Until the end of his life, Adner's modest artisan activity consisted of building and selling his wooden creations. In those years, the region of Berchtesgaden had strict commerce regulations. Carpenters were allowed only one specialized item to build to sell, so Adner specialized in making wooden boxes of many uses, basically decorative for storing basic necessities such as foodstuffs, valuables, toys, etc.

Berchtesgaden also imposed import/export fees for those goods which crossed the Bohemian border. However, the artisan could carry his wares by foot without paying a tax, so therefore - like many other artisans of his time - Adner chose to transport his goods by foot with a backpack far beyond Berchtesgadener land, trekking throughout Bavaria and farther into Austria and Switzerland. The wooden boxes were carried by Adner, over his shoulder and even over his head. He continued this activity long after he had reached his 100th birthday.

For a pastime, Anton Adner would also knit artisan socks, to supplement his income along with his wooden boxes.

== National fame ==
Bavarian royalty had spotted Anton Adner for the inauguration of a brine device at Berchtesgaden. Then Adner was presented in 1814 at the Frauenkirche cathedral of Munich for Maundy Thursday, as the oldest man in Bavaria. For the occasion, Adner participated in the rite of foot washing and attended a theatre for the first time in his life. During the event, Adner, who then claimed to be 110 years old, also managed to climb the 92-meter-high southern tower of the cathedral. A portrait, the Frauenturm (Lady's Tower), was engraved to commemorate the deed, but it was destroyed during a World War II bombing raid. Nonetheless, Munich-based painter Kleiber did a painting of it, which hangs in the museum of Berchtesgaden.

In 1817, at the alleged age of 112, Anton Adner met Emperor Maximilian I who supported his medical care.
