= Prince-bishop =

Bishop who also rules a principality

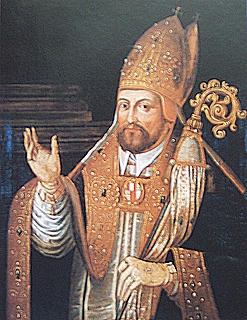
Johann Otto von Gemmingen, Prince-Bishop of Augsburg (1591–1598)

A prince-bishop is a bishop who is also the civil ruler of some secular principality and sovereignty, as opposed to Prince of the Church itself, a title associated with cardinals. Since 1951, the sole extant prince-bishop has been the Bishop of Urgell, Catalonia, who has remained ex officio one of two co-princes of Andorra, along with the French president.

== Overview ==
In the West, with the decline of imperial power from the 4th century onwards in the face of the barbarian invasions, sometimes Christian bishops of cities took the place of the Roman commander, made secular decisions for the city and led their own troops when necessary. Later relations between a prince-bishop and the burghers were invariably not cordial. As cities demanded charters from emperors, kings, or their prince-bishops and declared themselves independent of the secular territorial magnates, friction intensified between burghers and bishops. The principality or prince-bishopric (Hochstift) ruled politically by a prince-bishop could wholly or largely have overlapped with his diocesan jurisdiction, but some parts of his diocese, even the city of his residence, could have been exempt from his civil rule, obtaining the status of free imperial city. If the episcopal see was an archbishopric, the correct term was prince-archbishop; the equivalent in the regular (monastic) clergy was prince-abbot. A prince-bishop was usually considered an elected monarch. With the dissolution of the Holy Roman Empire in 1806, the title finally became defunct in the Confederation of the Rhine. However, in respect to the lands of the former Holy Roman Empire outside of French control, such as the Habsburg Monarchy, including Austria proper (Salzburg, Seckau), the Lands of the Bohemian Crown (the bulk of Olomouc and parts of Breslau), as well as in respect to the parts of the 1795-partitioned Polish state, including those forming part of the Kingdom of Galicia and Lodomeria or those acquired by the Kingdom of Prussia, the position continued in some cases nominally and was sometimes transformed into a new, titular type, initially recognized by the German Empire and Austria-Hungary until their demise, with the title ultimately abolished altogether by the pope in 1951.

The sole exception is the Bishop of Urgell, Catalonia, who no longer has any secular rights in Spain, but remains ex officio one of two co-princes of Andorra, along with the French head of state (currently its President), and thus the last extant prince-bishop.

In the Byzantine Empire, the still autocratic Emperors passed general legal measures assigning all bishops certain rights and duties in the secular administration of their dioceses, possibly as part of a development to put the Eastern Church in the service of the Empire, with its Ecumenical Patriarch almost reduced to the Emperor's minister of religious affairs.. The institution of prince-bishop was revived in the Orthodox Church in the modern times during the existence of the Prince-Bishopric of Montenegro.

== History ==
=== Holy Roman Empire ===
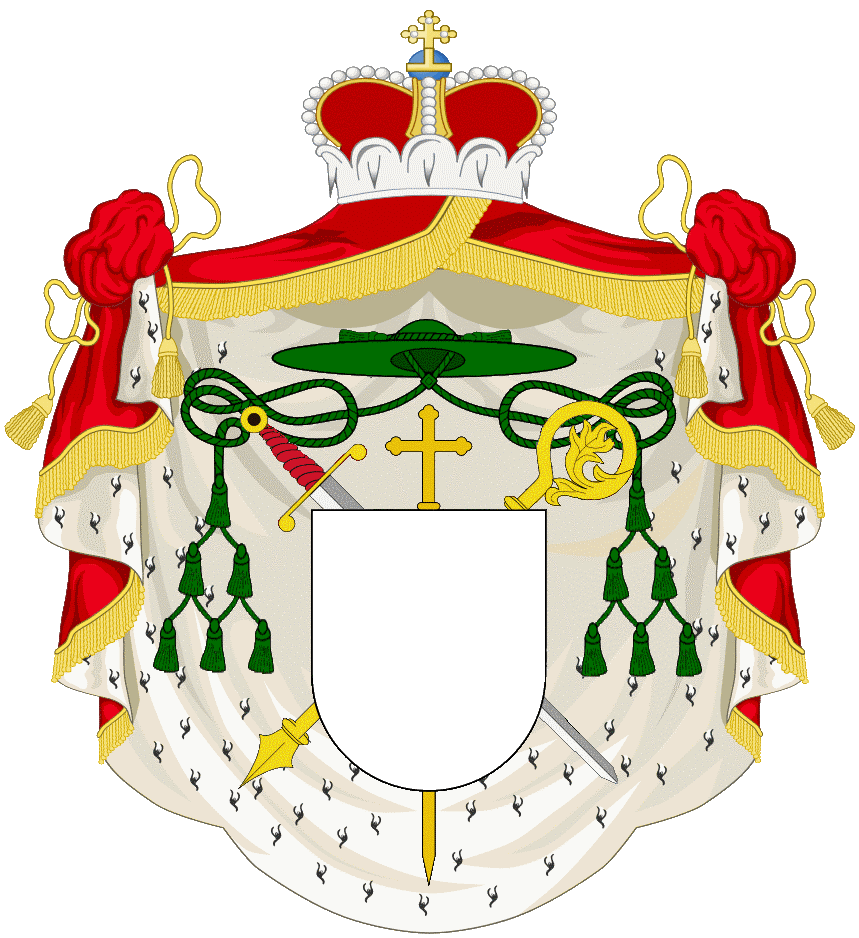
Arms of a Prince-Bishop with components from both princely and ecclesiastical heraldry.

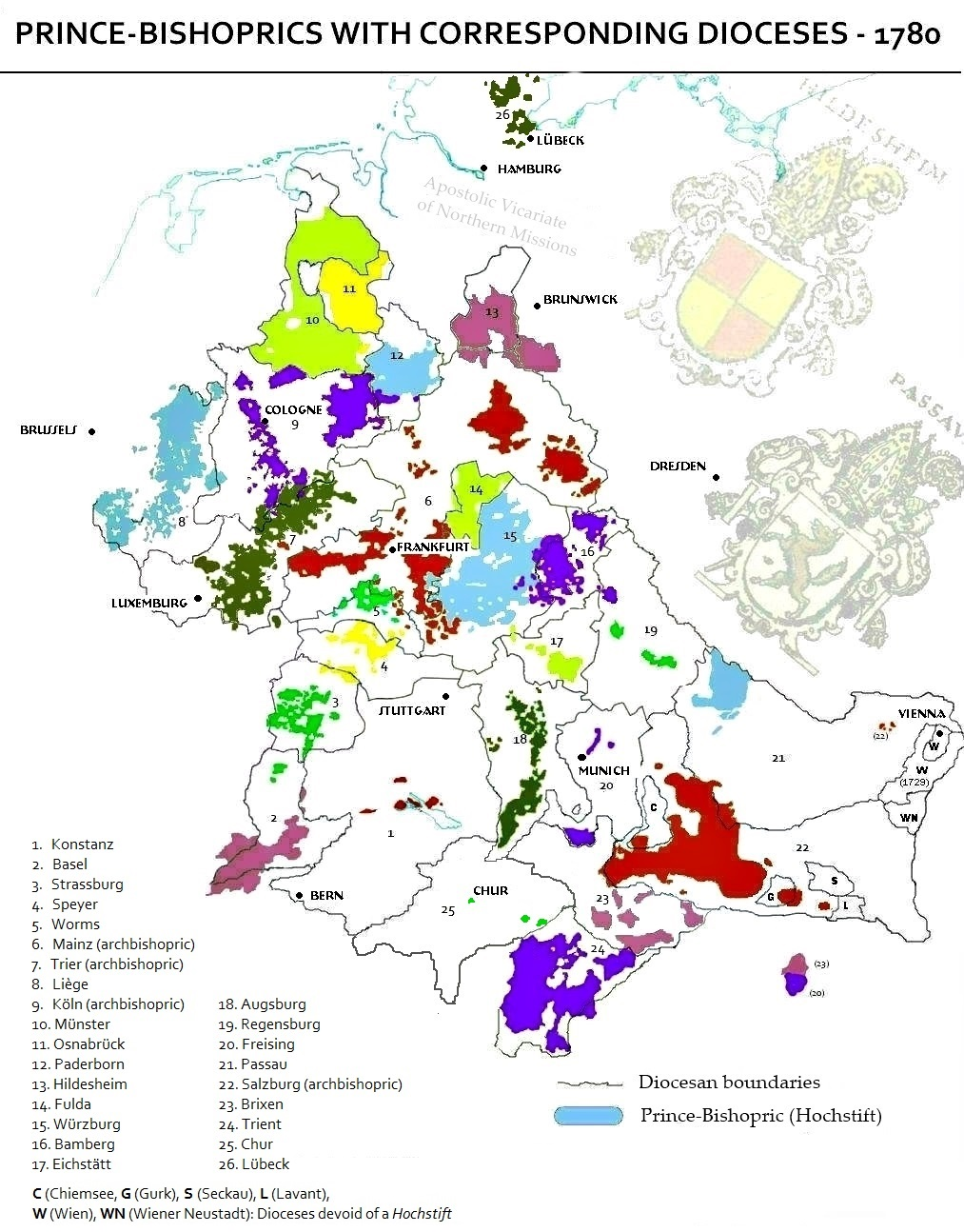
Ecclesiastical lands in the Holy Roman Empire, 1780

Bishops had been involved in the government of the Frankish realm and subsequent Carolingian Empire frequently as the clerical member of a duo of envoys styled Missus dominicus, but that was an individual mandate, not attached to the see. Prince-bishoprics were most common in the feudally fragmented Holy Roman Empire, where many were formally awarded the rank of an Imperial Prince Reichsfürst, granting them the immediate power over a certain territory and a representation in the Imperial Diet (Reichstag).

The stem duchies of the German Kingdom inside the Empire had strong and powerful dukes (originally, war-rulers), always looking out more for their duchy's "national interest" than for the Empire's. In turn the first Ottonian (Saxon) king Henry the Fowler and more so his son, Emperor Otto I, intended to weaken the power of the dukes by granting loyal bishops Imperial lands and vest them with regalia privileges. Unlike dukes they could not pass hereditary titles and lands to any descendants. Instead the Emperors reserved the implementation of the bishops of their proprietary church for themselves, defying the fact that according to canon law they were part of the transnational Catholic Church. This met with increasing opposition by the Popes, culminating in the fierce Investiture Controversy of 1076. Nevertheless, the Emperors continued to grant major territories to the most important (arch)bishops. The immediate territory attached to the episcopal see then became a prince-diocese or (arch)bishopric (Fürst(erz)bistum). The German term Hochstift was often used to denote the form of secular authority held by bishops ruling a prince-bishopric with Erzstift being used for prince-archbishoprics.

Emperor Charles IV by the Golden Bull of 1356 confirmed the privileged status of the Prince-Archbishoprics of Mainz, Cologne and Trier as members of the electoral college. At the eve of the Protestant Reformation, the Imperial states comprised 53 ecclesiastical principalities. They were finally secularized in the 1803 German Mediatization upon the territorial losses to France in the Treaty of Lunéville, except for the Mainz prince-archbishop and German archchancellor Karl Theodor Anton Maria von Dalberg, who continued to rule as Prince of Aschaffenburg and Regensburg. With the dissolution of the Holy Roman Empire in 1806, the title finally became defunct in the successor Confederation of the Rhine.

No less than three of the (originally only seven) prince-electors, the highest order of Reichsfürsten (comparable in rank with the French pairs), were prince-archbishops, each holding the title of Archchancellor (the only arch-office amongst them) for a part of the Empire; given the higher importance of an electorate, their principalities were known as Kurfürstentum ("electoral principality") rather than prince-archbishopric.

Arms	Name	Rank	Local name(s)	Imperial immediacy	Imperial Circle	Modern nation	Notes
	Augsburg	Bishopric	German: Hochstift Augsburg	c. 888–1803	Swabian	Germany	Augsburg became a Free Imperial City in 1276.
	Bamberg	Bishopric	German: Hochstift Bamberg	1245–1802	Franconian	Germany	
	Basel	Bishopric	French: Principauté de Bâle; German: Fürstbistum Basel	1032–1803	Upper Rhenish	France; Germany; Switzerland	Basel joined the Old Swiss Confederacy as the Canton of Basel in 1501. Secularized as a result of Swiss Mediation. A tiny fraction of the bishopric is not now in Switzerland: Schliengen and Istein are both now in Germany; a very small part of the Vogtei of St Ursanne is now in France.
	Besançon	Archbishopric	French: Archevêque de Besançon; German: Fürstbistum Bisanz	1043–1678/1803	Upper Rhenish	France	Made Prince by Henry III in 1043. Temporal power revoked and granted to the Free City of Besançon in 1290, while the title of Prince was retained by the Archbishop. Transferred to the Burgundian Circle in 1512. Imperial Diet seat was retained but left vacant after France annexed Besançon in 1678.
	Brandenburg	Bishopric	German: Hochstift Brandenburg	c. 1165–1598	Upper Saxon	Germany	Founded in 948; annihilated 983; re-established c. 1161. Continued by Lutheran administrators after the Reformation in 1520; secularized and incorporated into the Margraviate of Brandenburg in 1571.
	Bremen	Archbishopric	German: Erzstift Bremen	1180–1648	Lower Saxon	Germany	Continued by Lutheran administrators from the Reformation in 1566 until 1645/1648. Bremen itself became autonomous in 1186, and was confirmed as a Free Imperial City in 1646.
	Breslau (Duchy of Nysa)	Bishopric	Czech: Niské knížectví German: Fürstentum/Herzogtum Neisse; Polish: Księstwo Nyskie	1335/1348–1803	Lands of the Bohemian Crown	Poland; Czech Republic (temporal and diocesan territory); Germany (diocesan territory only)	Ceded 1335/1348 by Poland. After 1748 also fief of the Kingdom of Prussia. After dissolution of the HRE, secularized in 1810 (Prussian part) and in 1850 (Austrian part). The princely title continued until 1951, elevated to archbishopric 1930
	Brixen	Bishopric	German: Hochstift Brixen; Italian: Principato vescovile di Bressanone	1027–1803	Austrian	Italy	secularized to Tyrol
	Cambrai	Bishopric, then archbishopric	French: Principauté de Cambrai; German: Hochstift Kammerich	1007–1678	Lower Rhenish / Westphalian	France	To France by 1678 Peace of Nijmegen
	Chur	Bishopric	German: Bistum Chur; Romansh: Chapitel catedral da Cuira; Italian: Principato vescovile di Coira	831/1170–1526	Austrian	Switzerland; Liechtenstein	Secularized 1803 as a result of Swiss Mediation.
	Cologne	Archbishopric electorate	German: Erzstift Köln, Kurköln	953–1803	Electoral Rhenish	Germany	Prince-elector and Arch-Chancellor of Italy. Duke of Westphalia from 1180. Cologne became a Free Imperial City in 1288.
	Constance	Bishopric	German: Hochstift Konstanz	1155–1803	Swabian	Austria; Germany; Switzerland	Greatly reduced during the Reformation, when significant parts of Swabia and Switzerland became Protestant.
	Eichstätt	Bishopric	German: Hochstift Eichstätt	1305–1802	Franconian	Germany	
	Freising	Bishopric	German: Hochstift Freising	1294–1802	Bavarian	Austria; Germany	
	Fulda	Abbey, then bishopric	German: Reichskloster Fulda, Reichsbistum Fulda	1220–1802	Upper Rhenish	Germany	Imperial Abbey until 5 October 1752, when it was raised to a bishopric. Secularized in 1802 in the German Mediatization
	Geneva	Bishopric	French: Évêché de Genève; German: Fürstbistum Genf	1154-1534	Upper Rhenish	France; Switzerland	De jure reichsfrei since 1154. De facto dominated by their guardians, the counts of Geneva (until 1394) and Savoy (from 1401).In 1534 the city abolished episcopal rule, ending Savoyard influence by 1536.
	Halberstadt	Bishopric	German: Bistum Halberstadt	1180–1648	Lower Saxon	Germany	
	Havelberg	Bishopric	German: Bistum Havelberg	1151–1598	Lower Saxon	Germany	Founded in 948; annihilated 983; re-established 1130. Continued by Lutheran administrators from Reformation in 1548 until 1598
	Hildesheim	Bishopric	German: Hochstift Hildesheim	1235–1803	Lower Saxon	Germany	
	Lausanne	Bishopric	French: Principauté épiscopale de Lausanne; German: Bistum Lausanne	1270–1536	Upper Rhenish	Switzerland	Conquered by the Swiss city canton of Bern in 1536.
	Lebus	Bishopric	German: Bistum Lebus; Polish: Biskupstwo lubuskie	1248/1454/1506–1598	Lands of the Bohemian Crown, later Upper Saxon	Germany; Poland	Established 1124 in Poland, 1248-1372 disputed and 1372 ultimately lost to HRE. 1372–1454 fief of the Bohemian crown, seated in Fürstenwalde from 1385; reichsfrei ostensibly from 1248, but challenged by Brandenburg. Continued by Hohenzollern Lutheran administrators from Protestant Reformation in 1555 until secularization in 1598.
	Liège	Bishopric	French: Principauté de Liége; German: Fürstbistum Lüttich; Walloon: Principåté d' Lidje	980–1789/1795	Lower Rhenish / Westphalian	Belgium; Netherlands	
	Lübeck	Bishopric	German: Hochstift Lübeck	1180–1803	Lower Saxon	Germany	Seated in Eutin from the 1270s; Reformation started in 1535, continued by Lutheran administrators from 1586 until secularization in 1803. Lübeck became a Free Imperial City in 1226.
	Lyon	Archbishopric	French: Archevêque de Lyon; Arpitan: Arch·evèque de Liyon	1157-1312	n/a	France	Seated in Lyon; Reichsfreiheit confirmed by Frederick Barbarossa in 1157. Annexed by the Kingdom of France in 1312.
	Magdeburg	Archbishopric	German: Erzstift Magdeburg	1180–1680	Lower Saxon	Germany	Continued by Lutheran administrators between 1566 and 1631, and again from 1638 until 1680.
	Mainz	Archbishopric electorate	German: Erzbistum Mainz, Kurmainz	c. 780–1803	Electoral Rhenish	Germany	Prince-elector and Arch-Chancellor of Germany.
	Merseburg	Bishopric	German: Bistum Merseburg	1004–1565	Upper Saxon	Germany	Administered by the Lutheran Electorate of Saxony between 1544 and 1565.
	Metz	Bishopric	French: Évêché de Metz; German: Hochstift Metz	10th century–1552	Upper Rhenish	France	One of the Three Bishoprics ceded to France by the 1552 Treaty of Chambord.
	Minden	Bishopric	German: Hochstift Minden	1180–1648	Lower Rhenish / Westphalian	Germany	
	Münster	Bishopric	German: Hochstift Münster	1180–1802	Lower Rhenish / Westphalian	Germany	
	Naumburg	Bishopric	German: Bistum Naumburg-Zeitz		Upper Saxon	Germany	Under guardianship of Meissen from 1259. Administered by Saxony from 1564.
	Olomouc	Bishopric, then archbishopric	Czech: Arcibiskupství olomoucké German: Erzbistum Olmütz; Polish: Archidiecezja ołomuniecka	until 1803	Lands of the Bohemian Crown	Czech Republic; Poland	The Czech bishopric (later Metropolitan) of Olomouc, as a fief of the Bohemian Crown, was the peer of the Margraviate of Moravia, and from 1365 its prince-bishop was 'Count of the Bohemian Chapel', i.e., first court chaplain, who was to accompany the monarch on his frequent travels. After 1742 also fief of the Kingdom of Prussia. Secularized in 1803, but the princely title continued. However, all bishops' princely titles were abolished by the pope in 1951.
	Osnabrück	Bishopric	German: Hochstift Osnabrück	1225/1236–1802	Lower Rhenish / Westphalian	Germany	Alternated between Catholic and Protestant incumbents after the Thirty Years' War; secularized in 1802/1803
	Paderborn	Bishopric	German: Fürstbistum Paderborn	1281–1802	Lower Rhenish / Westphalian	Germany	
	Passau	Bishopric	German: Hochstift Passau	999–1803	Bavarian	Austria; Germany	Princely title was confirmed at Nuremberg in 1217.
	Ratzeburg	Bishopric	German: Bistum Ratzeburg	1236–1648	Lower Saxon	Germany	Ruled by Lutheran administrators between 1554 and 1648.
	Regensburg	Bishopric, then archbishopric electorate	German: Hochstift Regensburg	1132?–1803	Bavarian	Germany	Regensburg became a Free Imperial City in 1245.
	Salzburg	Archbishopric electorate	German: Fürsterzbistum Salzburg	1278–1803	Bavarian	Austria	Raised to an electorate in 1803, but simultaneously secularized; see Electorate of Salzburg. Since 1648, the archbishop has also borne the title Primas Germaniae, First [Bishop] of Germania, which used to include the right to preside over the Princes of the Holy Roman Empire. However, all bishops' princely titles were abolished by the pope in 1951.
	Schwerin	Bishopric	German: Bistum Schwerin	1180–1648	Lower Saxon	Germany	Ruled by an administrator between 1516 and 1648.
	Speyer	Bishopric	German: Hochstift Speyer	888–1803	Upper Rhenish	Germany	Territories to the east of the Rhine were annexed by France in 1681, confirmed in 1697. Speyer became a Free Imperial City in 1294.
	Strasbourg	Bishopric	Alemannic German: Bistum Strossburi; French: Évêché de Strasbourg; German: Fürstbistum Straßburg	982–1803	Upper Rhenish	France; Germany	Territories to the east of the Rhine were annexed by France in 1681, confirmed in 1697.
	Tarentaise	Archbishopric	French: Prince-évêque de Tarentaise; Arpitan: Prince Evèque de Tarentèsa; Italian: Principato vescovile di Tarantasia	1186-1769	Upper Rhenish	France	Count of Tarentaise from 996; reichsfrei from 1186. De facto dominated by their guardians Savoy (from 1271). Secularized and annexed by the Kingdom of Sardinia 1769.
	Toul	Bishopric	French: Principauté de Toul; German: Bistum Tull	10th century – 1552	Upper Rhenish	France	One of the Three Bishoprics ceded to France by the 1552 Treaty of Chambord, confirmed in 1648.
	Trent	Bishopric	Italian: Principato vescovile di Trento; Venetian: Principe-vescovo de Trento; German: Fürstbistum Trient	1027–1803	Austrian	Italy	Secularized to Tyrol in 1803.
	Trier	Archbishopric electorate	German: Erzbistum Trier, Kurtrier; French: Archevêque Trèves	772–1803	Electoral Rhenish	Germany	Prince-elector and Arch-Chancellor of Burgundy.
	Utrecht	Bishopric	Dutch: Sticht Utrecht	1024–1528	Lower Rhenish / Westphalian	Netherlands	Sold to Charles V, Holy Roman Emperor in 1528, after which it was moved to the Burgundian Circle. Founding member of the Dutch Republic in 1579/1581, confirmed in 1648.
	Verden	Bishopric	German: Hochstift Verden	1180–1648	Lower Rhenish / Westphalian	Germany	Continued by Lutheran administrators after Reformation until 1645/1648, when it was continued as a secular and independent principality until its disestablishment in 1807. It became a part of the Kingdom of Hanover in 1815.
	Verdun	Bishopric	French: Principauté de Verdun; German: Bistum Wirten	10th century – 1552	Upper Rhenish	France	One of the Three Bishoprics ceded to France by the 1552 Treaty of Chambord, confirmed in 1648.
	Wollin/Cammin	Bishopric	Polish: Biskupie Księstwo Kamieńskie; German: Hochstift Cammin	1248–1544	Upper Saxon	Poland (temporal and diocesan territory); Germany (diocesan territory only)	Established 1140 in the Polish Duchy of Pomerania. Since 1181 part of HRE. Reichsfreiheit obtained 1248 from and lost 1544 again to Duchy of Pomerania. Secularized in 1650, to Brandenburg Province of Pomerania
	Worms	Bishopric	German: Bistum Worms	861–1801	Upper Rhenish	Germany	Worms city rule established by Bishop Burchard (1000–25). Episcopal residence at Ladenburg from 1400. Held large estates in the former Lahngau region. Territories on the Left Bank of the Rhine lost by the 1797 Treaty of Campo Formio; secularized at first to the French Empire, then to Baden and Hesse-Darmstadt in 1815.

The suffragan-bishoprics of Gurk (established 1070), Chiemsee (1216), Seckau (1218), and Lavant (1225) sometimes used the Fürstbischof title, but never held any reichsfrei territory. However, all bishops' princely titles were abolished by the pope in 1951.

The Patriarchate of Aquileia (1077–1433) was conquered by Venice in 1420 and officially incorporated after the 1445 Council of Florence.

In Brescia Bishop Notingus was made count of Brescia in 844.

In the Bishopric of Belley, Saint Anthelm of Belley was granted Reichsfreiheit by Emperor Frederick I, but submitted temporal authorities to the Duchy of Savoy in 1401.

The Bishopric of Sion (French: Principauté épiscopale de Sion, German: Bistum Sitten) was from 999 a classic example of unified secular and diocesan authority. It progressively lost its powers since the Renaissance, and was finally replaced by the Republic of the Seven Tithings in 1634.

=== State of the Teutonic Order ===
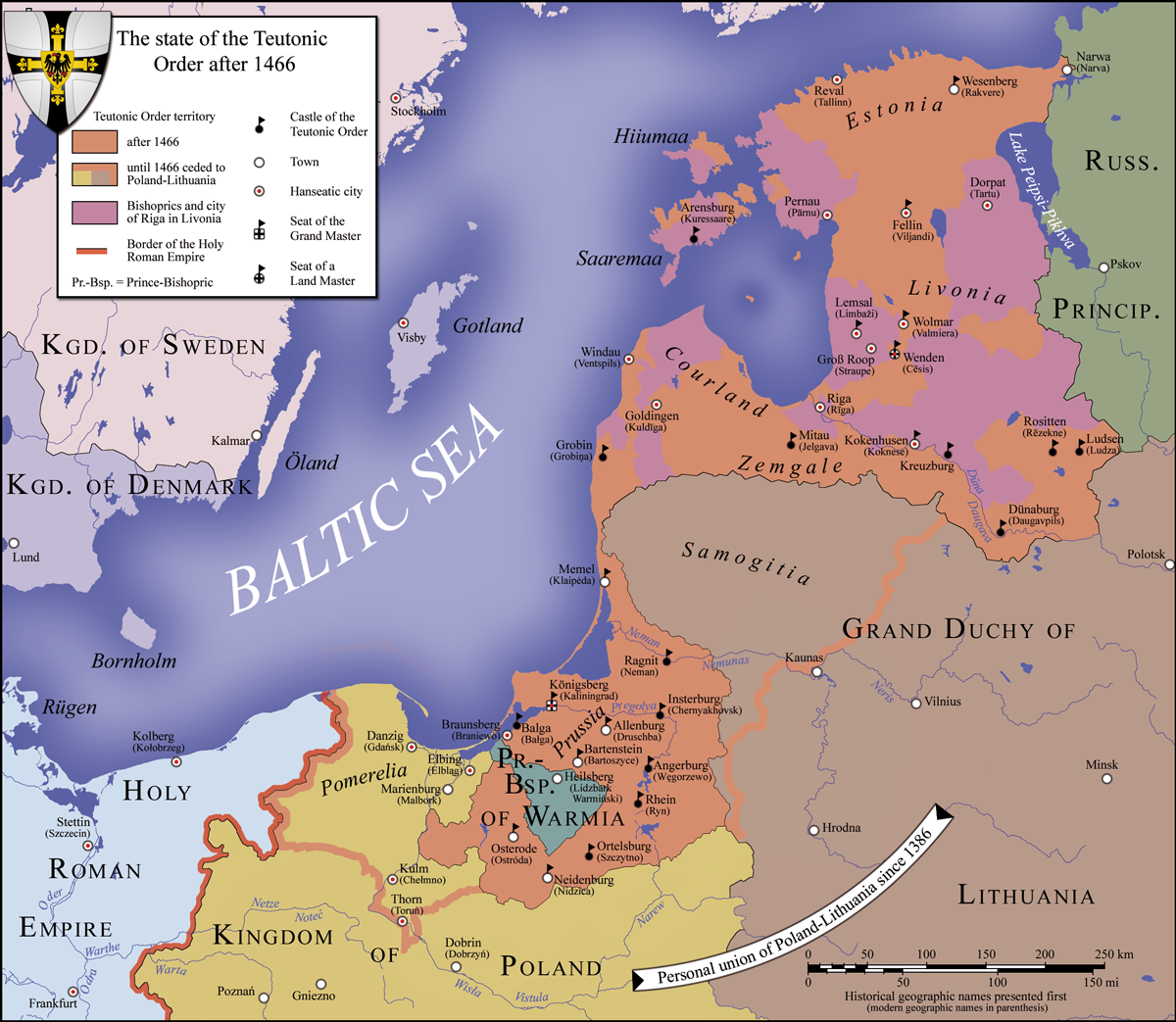
Order's State in 1466: Livonian episcopal territories in violet, Prince-Bishopric of Warmia in cyan

Upon the incorporation of the Livonian Brothers of the Sword in 1237, the territory of the Order's State largely corresponded with the Diocese of Riga. Bishop Albert of Riga in 1207 had received the lands of Livonia as an Imperial fief from the hands of German king Philip of Swabia, he however had to come to terms with the Brothers of the Sword. At the behest of Pope Innocent III the Terra Mariana confederation was established, whereby Albert had to cede large parts of the episcopal territory to the Livonian Order. Albert proceeded tactically in the conflict between the Papacy and Emperor Frederick II: in 1225 he reached the acknowledgement of his status as a Prince-Bishop of the Empire, though the Roman Curia insisted on the fact that the Christianized Baltic territories were solely under the suzerainty of the Holy See. By the 1234 Bull of Rieti, Pope Gregory IX stated that all lands acquired by the Teutonic Knights were no subject of any conveyancing by the Emperor.

Within this larger conflict, the continued dualism of the autonomous Riga prince-bishop and the Teutonic Knights led to a lengthy friction. Around 1245 the Papal legate William of Modena reached a compromise: though incorporated into the Order's State, the archdiocese and its suffragan bishoprics were acknowledged with their autonomous ecclesiastical territories by the Teutonic Knights. The bishops pursued the conferment of the princely title by the Holy Roman Emperor to stress their sovereignty. In the original Prussian lands of the Teutonic Order, Willam of Modena established the suffragan bishoprics of Culm, Pomesania, Samland and Warmia. From the late 13th century onwards, the appointed Warmia bishops were no longer members of the Teutonic Knights, a special status confirmed by the bestowal of the princely title by Emperor Charles IV in 1356.

Arms	Name	Rank	Local name(s)	Territory	Modern nation	Notes
	Courland	Bishopric	German: Hochstift Kurland; Latvian: Kurzemes bīskapija Low German: Bisdom Curland; Polish: Biskupstwo kurlandzkie	Terra Mariana	Latvia	Established about 1234, the smallest of the Livonian dioceses. From 1585 under the suzerainty of the Polish–Lithuanian Commonwealth, part of the Duchy of Livonia. Secularized in 1559 and occupied by Prince Magnus of Denmark.
	Dorpat	Bishopric	Estonian: Tartu piiskopkond German: Hochstift Dorpat; Low German: Bisdom Dorpat	Terra Mariana	Estonia	Bishop Hermann, appointed by his brother Bishop Albert of Riga, received the title of a prince-bishop by King Henry VII of Germany in 1225. Dorpat (Estonian: Tartu) remained a suffragan diocese of Riga. Dissolved in the course of the Protestant Reformation in 1558.
	Ermland	Bishopric	German: Fürstbistum Ermland; Polish: Biskupie Księstwo Warmińskie	Prussia	Poland (temporal and diocesan territory); Lithuania; Russia (diocesan territory only)	Established by Papal legate William of Modena in 1243, princely title documented in the Golden Bull of 1356. Incorporated into the Jagiellon kingdom of Poland in 1466 and re-established as an autonomous prince-bishopric under the Polish crown in 1479 (see below).
	Ösel-Wiek	Bishopric	Estonian: Saare-Lääne piiskopkond German: Bistum Ösel-Wiek; Low German: Bisdom Ösel-Wiek	Terra Mariana	Estonia	Established on Saaremaa island in 1228 under Bishop Gottfried, appointed by Bishop Albert of Riga, vested with the title of a prince-bishop by King Henry VII of Germany. It remained a suffragan diocese of Riga. Dissolved in the course of the Protestant Reformation in 1559.
	Riga	Archbishopric	German: Erzbistum Riga; Latvian: Rīgas arhibīskapija Low German: Erzbisdom Riga	Terra Mariana	Latvia	Episcopal see at Üxküll 1186–1202. In 1225 Albert of Riga received the title of a Prince-bishop of Livonia by Emperor Frederick II. Last Archbishop William of Brandenburg resigned in 1561 during the Livonian War, while territory fell to the Polish–Lithuanian Commonwealth, and later to Sweden in 1621.

=== Kingdom of Poland and Polish–Lithuanian Commonwealth ===
Three bishoprics were initially parts of the Kingdom of Poland and its offshoots before being subsequently incorporated into the Holy Roman Empire, namely the bishoprics of Wolin/Kamień (Wollin/Cammin) (1140–1181), Lubusz (Lebus) (1125–1372) and Wrocław (Breslau) (1201–1335/1348), with the latter two of them continuing, however, as suffragan to the Polish archbishopric of Gniezno for many years later (until 1424 in the case of Lebus and until 1821 in the case of Breslau). On the other hand, the Prince Bishopric of Warmia was obtained by Poland following the Second Peace of Thorn.

Arms	Name	Rank	Local name(s)	Years under Polish crown or offshoots	Modern nation	Notes
	Courland	Bishopric	German: Hochstift Kurland; Latvian: Kurzemes bīskapija Low German: Bisdom Curland; Polish: Biskupstwo kurlandzkie	1585–1559	Latvia	Established about 1234, the smallest of the Livonian dioceses. From 1585 under the suzerainty of the Polish–Lithuanian Commonwealth, part of the Duchy of Livonia. Secularized in 1559 and occupied by Prince Magnus of Denmark.
	Gniezno (Duchy of Łowicz)	Archbishopric	Polish: Księstwo łowickie	1136–1795	Poland	Established 1136 around Łowicz in the Polish Duchy of Masovia as endowment of the archbishops of Gniezno and primates of Poland. In the years 1572–1795, the primate of Poland presided ex officio over the Senate of the Kingdom as the honorific 'First Prince of the Kingdom' (Primus Princeps), regarded as a vicegerent second only to the king and proclaimed interrex in case of interregnum. Upon the third partition of the Polish–Lithuanian Commonwealth in 1795, the Prussian authorities seized the Duchy of Łowicz and forbade archbishops of Gniezno to style themselves primates of Poland, awarding them the princely title (Fürst) as a compensation.
	Kraków (Duchy of Siewierz)	Bishopric	Polish: Księstwo Siewierskie	1443–1791	Poland	Wenceslaus I, Duke of Cieszyn, sold a Duchy of Siewierz to the Bishop of Kraków Zbigniew Cardinal Oleśnicki for 6,000 silver Groschen in 1443. This tiny duchy had its own laws, treasury and army. In 1790, the Great Sejm took over the Duchy of Siewierz to the State Treasury and incorporated it directly into the Polish–Lithuanian Commonwealth.
	Lebus	Bishopric	Polish: Biskupstwo lubuskie German: Bistum Lebus	1124–1248/1372	Germany; Poland	Established 1124 in Poland, 1248–1372 disputed and 1372 ultimately lost to HRE. 1372–1454 fief of the Bohemian crown, seated in Fürstenwalde since 1385; Reichsfreiheit ostensibly since 1248, but challenged by Brandenburg. Continued by Hohenzollern Lutheran administrators after Protestant Reformation in 1555 until secularization in 1598.
	Warmia	Bishopric	Polish: Biskupie Księstwo Warmińskie; German: Fürstbistum Ermland	1466–1772	Poland (temporal and diocesan territory); Lithuania; Russia (diocesan territory only)	Established as a part of the State of the Teutonic Order (see above) by Papal legate William of Modena in 1243, with princely title documented in the Golden Bull of 1356. Incorporated into the Jagiellon kingdom of Poland in 1466 and re-established as an autonomous prince-bishopric under the Polish crown in 1479. It was ultimately abolished in the course of the Prussian annexation in 1772 during the First Partition of Poland.
	Wolin/Kamień	Bishopric	Polish: Biskupie Księstwo Kamieńskie; German: Hochstift Cammin	1140–1181	Poland (temporal and diocesan territory); Germany (diocesan territory only)	Established 1140 in the Polish Duchy of Pomerania. Since 1181 part of HRE. Reichsfreiheit obtained 1248 from and lost 1544 again to Duchy of Pomerania. Secularized in 1650, to Brandenburg Province of Pomerania
	Wrocław (Duchy of Nysa)	Bishopric	Polish: Księstwo Nyskie; German: Fürstentum/Herzogtum Neisse; Czech: Niské knížectví	1201–1335/1348	Poland; Czech Republic (temporal and diocesan territory); Germany (diocesan territory only)	Ceded 1335/1348 to Lands of the Bohemian Crown (part of HRE). After dissolution of the HRE, secularized in 1810 (Prussian part) and in 1850 (Austrian part), but the princely title continued until 1951, elevated to archbishopric 1930

=== England ===
==== Durham ====
The bishops of Durham, while not sovereign, held extensive rights usually reserved to the English, and later British, monarch within the county palatine of Durham. In 1075 Walcher, the bishop of Durham, was allowed to purchase the earldom of Northumbria; this marked the beginning of the bishops' temporal powers, which expanded during the Middle Ages before being gradually curbed from the sixteenth century onwards. Except for a brief period of suppression during the English Civil War, the bishopric retained some temporal powers until it was abolished by the Durham (County Palatine) Act 1836, when its powers returned to the Crown. The last institution of the palatinate, its court of chancery, was abolished in 1974.

==== Other English Prince-bishoprics ====
- The Isle of Ely was a royal liberty, and between 1109 and 1535 a county palatine, with traces of the bishop's princely status remaining until 1837.
- Hexhamshire was a county palatine under the Archbishop of York from at least the 14th century until 1572; prior to that, it was a royal liberty.

=== France ===
From the tenth century civil wars on, many bishops took over the powers of the local count, as authorised by the king. For example, at Chalons-sur-Marne the bishop ruled the lands 20 km (12 mi) around the town, while the Archbishop of Rheims demarcated his territory with five fortresses of Courville, Cormicy, Betheneville, Sept-Saulx and Chaumuzy. A number of French bishops did hold a noble title, with a tiny territory usually about their seat; it was often a princely title, especially Count but also Prince or Baron, including actual seigneurial authority and rights. Indeed, six of the twelve original Pairies (the royal vassals awarded with the highest precedence at Court) were episcopal: the Archbishop of Reims, the Bishop of Langres, and the Bishop of Laon held a ducal title, the bishops of Beauvais, Chalôns, and Noyon had comital status. They were later joined by the Archbishop of Paris, who was awarded a ducal title, but with precedence over the others.

France also counted a number of prince-bishops formerly within the Holy Roman Empire such those of Besançon, Cambrai, Strasbourg, Metz, Toul, Verdun, and Belley. The bishops of Arles, Embrun, and Grenoble also qualify as princes of episcopal cities. The bishop of Viviers was Count of Viviers and Prince de Donzère. The bishop of Sisteron was also Prince de Lurs, the title of count was held by the Archbishop of Lyons, and the bishops of Gap, Saint-Paul-Trois-Châteaux, Vienne and Die were Seigneurs of their cities.

Never part of the empire were Lisieux, Cahors, Chalon-sur-Saône, Léon, Dol and Vabres whose bishops were also counts. Ajaccio was Count of Frasso. The bishops of Sarlat, Saint-Malo (Baron de Beignon) and of Luçon were Barons and Tulle was Viscount of the city. The bishop of Mende was governor and count, Puy held the title Count of Velay, Quimper was Seigneur of the city and Comte de Cornouailles, Valence was Seigneur and Count of the city. Montpellier's bishop was Count of Mauguio and Montferrand, Marquis of Marquerose and Baron of Sauve, Durfort, Salevoise, and Brissac. The bishop of Saint-Claude was Seigneur of all the lands of Saint-Claude. The bishops of Digne (Seigneur and Baron), Pamiers (co-Seigneur), Albi, Lectoure, Saint-Brieuc, Saint-Papoul, Saint-Pons, and Uzès were Seigneurs of the cities.

=== Portugal ===
From 1472 to 1967, the bishop of Coimbra held the comital title of Count of Arganil, being thus called "bishop-count" (Portuguese: Bispo-Conde). The use of the comital title declined during the 20th century since Portugal has become a republic and nobility privileges have ceased to be officially recognized, and was ultimately discontinued.

=== Montenegro ===
The bishops of Cetinje, who took as the Prince-Bishops of Montenegro the place of the earlier secular (Grand) Voivodes in 1516, had a unique position of Slavonic, Orthodox prince-bishops of Montenegro under Ottoman suzerainty. It was eventually secularized and became ruled by hereditary princes and ultimately Kings of Montenegro in 1852, as reflected in their styles:

- first Vladika i upravitelj Crne Gore i Brda ("Bishop and Ruler of Montenegro and the Highlands")
- from 13 March 1852 (New Style): Po milosti Božjoj knjaz i gospodar Crne Gore i Brda ("By the grace of God Prince and Sovereign of Montenegro and the Highlands")
- from 28 August 1910 (New Style): Po milosti Božjoj kralj i gospodar Crne Gore ("By the grace of God, King and Sovereign of Montenegro")

== Contemporary ==
The Bishop of Urgell, Catalonia, who no longer has any secular rights in Spain, remains ex officio one of two co-princes of Andorra, along with the French head of state (currently its President)

== Modern informal usage ==
The term has been used by Episcopalians in North America to describe modern bishops with commanding personalities usually of previous generations. One such individual was Bishop Horace W. B. Donegan of whom Episcopal suffragan bishop Robert E. Terwilliger said "We often say that Bishop Donegan is the last prince bishop of the church because in his graciousness, in his presence, in his total lack of any crisis of identity, we have seen what a bishop is; and we know that it is a kind of royalty in Christ."

Anglican Archbishop Robert Duncan expressed his view that the pastoral changes "in the 1970s [were] a revolution in reaction to those prince bishops – they had all this authority, they had all this power." So systems such as the Commission on Ministry system in the Episcopal Church were "to replace an individual's authority with a committee's authority."

== See also ==
- Crown-cardinal
- Lord Bishop
- Lords Spiritual
- Nobles of the Church (Kingdom of Hungary)
- Political Catholicism
- Prince-abbot
- Prince-Provost
- Prince of the Church
- Temporal power

== Sources ==
- Westermann, Großer Atlas zur Weltgeschichte (in German)
