= Prince-abbot =

German cleric

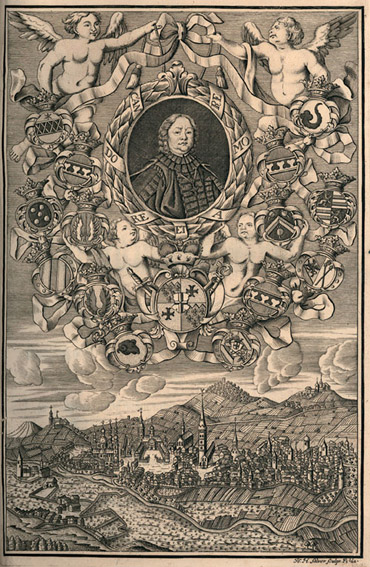
Adolphus von Dalberg, Prince-Abbot of Fulda 1726–1737

In the Holy Roman Empire, a prince-abbot (German: Fürstabt) was the cleric who headed a princely abbey. The prince-abbot had a seat and an individual vote (votum virile) in the Imperial Diet alongside the prince-bishops. They ranked higher than the imperial abbots and imperial abbesses who although they were also immediate, held only two collective votes in the Diet.

Actual prince-abbots were:

- the Abbot of Fulda, "Archchancellor of the Empress", according to a 1220 decree by Emperor Frederick II, elevated to a Prince-Bishopric by Pope Benedict XIV in 1752
- the Abbot of Prüm, elevated by Emperor Frederick II in 1222, held in personal union by the Archbishop of Trier from 1576
- the Abbot of Kempten, confirmed by King Charles IV in 1348
- the Abbot of Murbach, elevated by King Ferdinand I in 1548
- the Prince Abbot of Saint Gall, elevated by King Philip of Germany in 1207
- the Abbot of Stavelot-Malmedy
- the Abbot of Corvey, elevated to a Prince-Bishop in 1792
- the Princess-Abbess of Quedlinburg
- the Princess-Abesses of the Imperial and Royal Theresian Stift for Noble Ladies in the Castle of Prague

== See also ==
- Prince-Bishop
- Prince-Provost
