= Prince-provost =

High-ranking church official

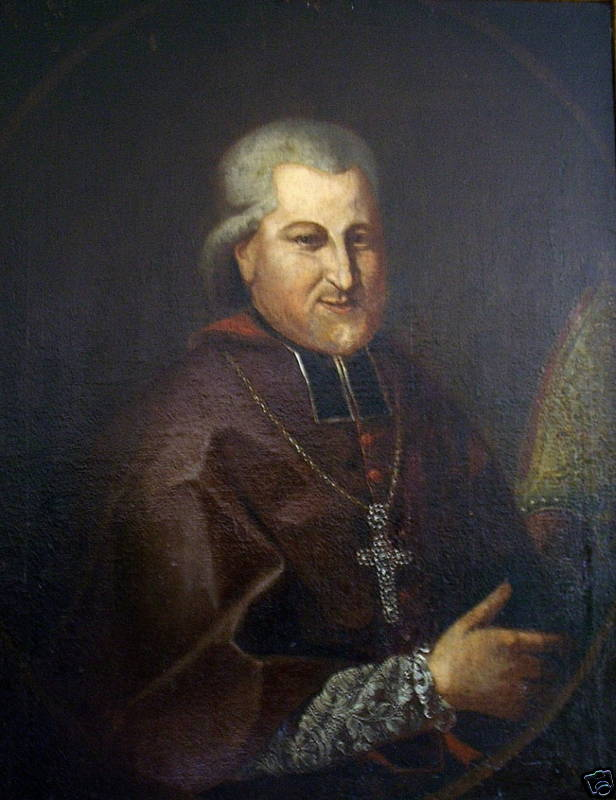
Joseph Konrad von Schroffenberg, last Prince-provost of Berchtesgaden, c. 1790

Prince-provost (German: Fürstpropst) is a rare title for a monastic superior with the ecclesiastical style of provost who is also a Prince of the Holy Roman Empire (Reichsfürst), holding a direct vote in the Imperial Diet assembly coequal to an actual Prince-abbot, as in each case treated below.

== Berchtesgaden Provostry ==
The monastery of Augustinian Canons Regular at Berchtesgaden, established about 1102, had already enjoyed an immediate status within the Bavarian Circle, equal to an Imperial abbey. In 1559 the provosts were elevated to the rank of a Prince of the Empire in chief of the small lordship. The full style of the office became Fürst, Propst und Herr zu Berchtesgaden. In the course of the German Mediatisation in 1803, the Berchtesgaden Provostry was annexed by the Electorate of Salzburg, it finally fell to the Kingdom of Bavaria in 1810.

=== Prince-provosts of Berchtesgaden ===
- 1559–1567 Wolfgang Griesstätter zu Haslach; 1541–1559 Provost and Imperial prelate (German: Reichsprälat) in Berchtesgaden
- 1567–1594 Jakob Pütrich
- 1594–1650 Ferdinand von Bayern, also Elector and Prince-Archbishop of Cologne, Prince-Bishop of Hildesheim, Liège and Münster from 1612, as well as Prince-Bishop of Paderborn from 1618.
- 1650–1688 Maximilian Heinrich von Bayern, also Elector of Cologne and Prince-Bishop of Hildesheim and Liège as well as Prince-Bishop of Münster from 1683
- 1688–1723 Joseph Clemens von Bayern, Prince-Bishop of Freising and Regensburg from 1685 to 1694, Elector of Cologne from 1688, Prince-Bishop of Liège (from 1694) and Hildesheim (from 1702)
- 1723–1732 Julius Heinrich von Rehlingen-Radau
- 1732–1752 Cajetan Anton von Notthaft
- 1752–1768 Michael Balthasar von Christallnigg
- 1768–1780 Franz Anton Josef von Hausen-Gleichenstorff
- 1780–1803 Joseph Konrad von Schroffenberg-Mös (d. 1803), also Prince-Bishop of Freising and Regensburg from 1789

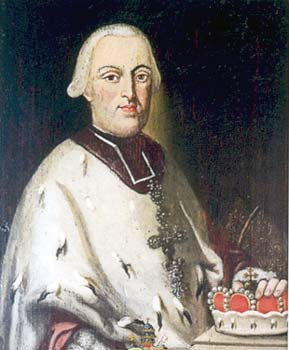
Clemens Wenceslaus of Saxony, last Prince-Provost of Ellwangen

== Ellwangen Abbey ==
The abbots of the Benedictine Abbey known as Stift Ellwangen founded in 764 had become Princes of the Empire (style Reichsabt) in 1215 with a direct vote in the Imperial Diet. Since its conversion into a college of secular canons in 1460, the superiors retained that status, with their full style changed to Fürstliche Pröpste zu Ellwangen ("Princely Provosts of Ellwangen") in the Swabian Circle. During the German Mediatisation on 27 April 1803 it was incorporated into the Electorate of Württemberg.

=== Prince-Provosts of Ellwangen ===
- 1460–1461 Johann von Hürnheim, previously Abbot nullius of Ellwangen 1452–1460
- 1461–1502 Albrecht von Rechberg
- 1502–1503 Bernhard von Westerstetten
- 1503–1521 Albrecht Thumb von Neuburg
- 1521–1552 Henry of the Palatinate, also Prince-Bishop of Worms from 1523 and of Utrecht from 1524 to 1529, Prince-Bishop of Freising from 1541
- 1552–1573 Cardinal Otto Truchsess von Waldburg, also Prince-Bishop of Augsburg since 1543
- 1573–1584 Christoph von Freyberg-Eisenberg
- 1584–1603 Wolfgang von Hausen, also Bishop of Regensburg 1602–1613
- 1603–1613 Johann Christoph von Westerstetten, also Bishop of Eichstädtt 1612–1637
- 1613–1620 Johann Christoph von Freyberg-Eisenberg
- 1621–1654 Johann Jakob Blarer von Wartensee
- 1654–1660 Johann Rudolf von Rechenberg
- 1660–1674 Johann Christoph von Freyberg-Allmendingen
- 1674–1687 Johann Christoph Adelmann von Adelmannsfelden
- 1687–1689 Heinrich Christoph von Wolframsdorf
- 1689–1694 Count Palatine Louis Anton of Neuburg, also Grand Master of the Teutonic Knights since 1684 and Prince-Bishop of Worms from 1691
- 1694–1732 Count Palatine Francis Louis of Neuburg, also Grand Master of the Teutonic Knights and Prince-Bishop of Worms, Elector and Archbishop of Trier from 1716 and of Mainz from 1729
- 1732–1756 Franz Georg von Schönborn-Buchheim, Elector of Trier since 1729, also Prince-Bishop of Worms from 1732
- 1756–1787 Anton Ignaz Joseph Graf von Fugger-Glött, also Prince-Bishop of Regensburg from 1769
- 1787–1803 Prince Clemens Wenceslaus of Saxony (d. 1812), Prince-Bishop of Freising 1763–1768 and of Regensburg 1763–1769, Elector of Trier and Prince-Bishop of Augsburg since 1768

== Weissenburg Abbey ==
The Benedictine abbey established at Alsatian Weissenburg (now Wissembourg) about 660 was eventually converted into a collegiate church (in 1524) then merged with the Bishopric of Speyer in 1546. The Speyer Prince-Bishops ruled as Provosts of Weissenburg in personal union, thereby holding two direct votes in the Imperial Diet. The 1648 Peace of Westphalia ceded Weissenburg to France, and the provostry was finally disestablished in the course of the French Revolution in 1789.

== See also ==
- Prince-abbot
- Prince-bishop
- Princes of the Holy Roman Empire
- Imperial State

== Sources ==
- WorldStatesmen- German States before 1918 A-E
