= 2021–22 figure skating season =

Competitive figure skating year, 2021/7/1 to 2022/6/30

- Date: July 1, 2021 – June 30, 2022
- Previous: 2020–21
- Next: 2022–23

The 2021–22 figure skating season began on July 1, 2021 and ended on June 30, 2022. During this season, elite skaters competed on the ISU Championship level at the 2022 European, Four Continents, World Junior, and World Championships, as well as at the 2022 Winter Olympics. They also competed at elite events such as the Grand Prix and Junior Grand Prix series, and the ISU Challenger Series.

As a result of the COVID-19 pandemic, the Grand Prix Final was cancelled, while parts of the Junior Grand Prix, Grand Prix, and Challenger Series were not held as scheduled. Among the ISU Championships events, the Four Continents Championships were relocated, and the World Junior Championships were postponed and relocated. Due to re-allocations, the Estonian Skating Union hosted three of the four ISU Championships events this season.

Beginning from the 2021–22 season, the International Skating Union officially changed the terminology in all ISU rules and events from "ladies" to "women".

On March 1, 2022, the ISU banned all figure skaters and officials from Russia and Belarus from attending any international competitions due to the 2022 Russian invasion of Ukraine.

== Impact of the COVID-19 pandemic ==
The ISU acknowledged two key challenges in organizing the season due to the ongoing COVID-19 pandemic: entry restrictions into host countries and/or return to the home countries and limited air travel options. However, the ISU remained committed to having a full calendar of events with modifications as necessary, and issued the following statement:

"Despite the lingering world-wide coronavirus pandemic, the ISU is looking forward to the Olympic season and will do its utmost to assist the ISU Members in maintaining and safely conducting the planned ISU Events and allowing a maximum number of participants."

On August 5, the ISU announced that due to varying travel and quarantine restrictions during the pandemic, it would consider re-allocation requests for the Junior Grand Prix series on a case-by-case basis according to an outlined criteria of preference. The ISU also said that they would abandon the re-allocation process in the event of an abundance of requests or overly complex requests that would cause logistical issues. In addition, the ISU decided not to implement a JGP ranking for the season and to instead prioritize holding the JGP series safely "with the best possible participation" in light of the pandemic. In October, the ISU announced alternative qualification criteria for the 2021–22 Junior Grand Prix Final.

On August 16, the ISU announced the cancellation of the third Grand Prix event, the 2021 Cup of China, citing the limited number of international flights to China and strict COVID-19 pandemic restrictions. In an attempt to preserve the Grand Prix series, the ISU asked for other ISU members to apply as alternate hosts on the originally scheduled dates. On August 27, the Gran Premio d'Italia was named as the replacement event. On December 2, the ISU announced that the 2021–22 Grand Prix Final would not be able to be held as scheduled in Osaka, Japan and that they were considering the possibility of postponement to later in the season. The event was definitively cancelled on December 17.

On September 13, the Chinese Skating Association announced the cancellation of the 2022 Four Continents Championships for similar reasons as the Cup of China. The ISU again asked for other members to apply as alternate hosts on the originally scheduled dates. After receiving no applications from non-European members, the ISU asked the Estonian Skating Union, the host of the European Championships, to host the Four Continents Championships in the same venue the following week (the originally scheduled dates).

On February 12, the ISU announced that the 2022 World Junior Championships could not be held as planned due to concerns about a surge in omicron variant cases in Bulgaria peaking on the originally scheduled dates, as well as the host nation's restrictive entry requirements. As the 2021 World Junior Championships were already cancelled, the ISU announced that they would evaluate the feasibility of postponing the event until May 2022, if the Bulgarian Skating Federation was willing and other ISU member nations were willing to attend. The final decision was expected to be made at the ISU Council meeting on February 24, but was delayed to allow time to assess the impact of the Russian invasion of Ukraine. On February 27, the ISU announced that in light of the pandemic and the Russian invasion of Ukraine, the event would potentially be re-allocated. On March 4, the ISU announced that the event would be held from April 13–17 in Tallinn, Estonia, the second ISU Championships event of the season to be re-allocated to the Estonian Skating Union.

=== ISU member nations' response ===
Due to travel restrictions caused by the pandemic, as well as varying vaccination requirements, several federations faced issues traveling to certain countries to compete. For example, Russia was unable to send athletes to France for the first two Junior Grand Prix events and required the ISU's re-allocation system to obtain additional quotas at other events. The federation also faced logistical difficulties in obtaining visas for their athletes at both Skate America and Skate Canada. Other federations limited international competitive opportunities for their skaters due to lengthy quarantine periods upon returning home. Both Japan and China did not send any athletes to the Junior Grand Prix, with China also skipping the entirety of the ISU Challenger Series; Japan only sent athletes to the latter events of the Challenger Series. China later also opted not to send any athletes to the World Championships or the World Junior Championships.

== Season notes ==
=== Age eligibility ===
Skaters are eligible to compete in ISU events on the junior or senior levels according to their age:

Level	Date of birth
Junior (females in all disciplines; males in singles)	Born between July 1, 2002 and June 30, 2008
Junior (males in pairs and ice dance)	Born between July 1, 2000 and June 30, 2008
Senior (all disciplines)	Born before July 1, 2006
Rules may not apply to non-ISU events such as national championships.

== Changes ==
If skaters of different nationalities team up, the ISU requires that they choose one country to represent.
Date refers to date when the change occurred or, if not available, the date when the change was announced.

=== Partnership changes ===
Discipline	Date	Type	Skaters	Other info	Refs
Pairs	July 7, 2021	Dissolved	(United States) Nica Digerness / Ian Meyh
Pairs	July 7, 2021	Formed	(United States) Nica Digerness / Mark Sadusky
Ice dance	July 14, 2021	Dissolved	(Canada) Jessica Li / Jacob Richmond
Pairs	July 22, 2021	Dissolved	(Italy) Giulia Papa / Riccardo Maglio
Pairs	July 22, 2021	Dissolved	(Italy) Irma Caldara / Marco Santucci
Pairs	July 22, 2021	Formed	(Italy) Irma Caldara / Riccardo Maglio
Pairs	July 25, 2021	Formed	(Finland) Milania Väänänen / Mikhail Akulov	For Finland
Ice dance	July 30, 2021	Dissolved	(Canada) Emmy Bronsard / Aissa Bouaraguia
Ice dance	August 1, 2021	Dissolved	(Switzerland) Arianna Wróblewska / Stéphane Walker
Ice dance	August 1, 2021	Formed	(Switzerland) Jasmine Tessari / Stéphane Walker	For Switzerland
Pairs	August 2, 2021	Dissolved	(United States) Aljona Savchenko / TJ Nyman
Pairs	August 3, 2021	Dissolved	(Georgia (country)) Alina Butaeva / Luka Berulava
Pairs	August 3, 2021	Dissolved	(Russia) Karina Safina / Sergei Bakhmat
Pairs	August 3, 2021	Formed	(Georgia (country)) Karina Safina / Luka Berulava	For Georgia
Pairs	August 3, 2021	Formed	(Russia) Taisiya Sobinina / Sergei Bakhmat
Ice dance	August 3, 2021	Dissolved	(Russia) Angelina Zimina / Aleksandr Gnedin
Ice dance	August 3, 2021	Formed	(Estonia) Darja Netjaga / Aleksandr Gnedin	For Estonia
Ice dance	August 3, 2021	Formed	(Finland) Daniela Ivanitskiy / David Goldshteyn
Ice dance	August 3, 2021	Dissolved	(Georgia (country)) Yulia Bitadze-Lebedeva / Mikhail Kaygorodtsev
Ice dance	August 3, 2021	Formed	(Georgia (country)) Yulia Bitadze-Lebedeva / Dmitri Parkhomenko	For Georgia
Ice dance	August 4, 2021	Dissolved	(Israel) Adel Tankova / Ronald Zilberberg
Ice dance	August 4, 2021	Formed	(Israel) Elizabeth Bernardini / Ronald Zilberberg
Pairs	August 14, 2021	Dissolved	(China) Tang Feiyao / Yang Yongchao
Pairs	August 14, 2021	Formed	(China) Zhang Siyang / Yang Yongchao
Pairs	August 16, 2021	Formed	(Australia) Maria Chernyshova / Harley Windsor	For Australia
Pairs	August 17, 2021	Formed	(Philippines) Isabella Gamez / Alexander Korovin	For the Philippines
Pairs	August 25, 2021	Formed	(Canada) Emmanuelle Proft / Nicolas Nadeau
Pairs	September 3, 2021	Formed	(Japan) Miyu Yunoki / Shoya Ichihashi
Ice dance	September 6, 2021	Dissolved	(United States) Katarina DelCamp / Ian Somerville
Ice dance	September 6, 2021	Formed	(United Kingdom) Katarina DelCamp / Billy Wilson French	For Great Britain
Ice dance	September 17, 2021	Formed	(United States) Avonley Nguyen / Grigory Smirnov	For the United States
Pairs	September 20, 2021	Dissolved	(Russia) Maria Pavlova / Ilia Spiridonov
Pairs	September 20, 2021	Formed	(Hungary) Maria Pavlova / Balázs Nagy	For Hungary
Ice dance	September 29, 2021	Dissolved	(Hungary) Emese Csiszér / Axel Lamasse
Ice dance	September 29, 2021	Dissolved	(Israel) Shira Ichilov / Laurent Abecassis	Abecassis retired
Ice dance	September 29, 2021	Dissolved	(France) Emily Bratti / Mathieu Couyras
Ice dance	September 29, 2021	Formed	(United States) Emily Bratti / Ian Somerville	For the United States
Ice dance	September 29, 2021	Formed	(United States) Sophia Eowyn Hsu / Vadym Kolesnik
Ice dance	October 4, 2021	Formed	(United States) Raffaella Koncius / Alexey Shchepetov	For the United States
Ice dance	October 4, 2021	Formed	(United States) Cayla Cottrell / Uladzislau Palkhouski	For the United States
Pairs	October 20, 2021	Dissolved	(United States) Laiken Lockley / Jedidiah Isbell
Pairs	October 21, 2021	Dissolved	(France) Cléo Hamon / Denys Strekalin
Ice dance	October 26, 2021	Dissolved	(Hungary) Emily Monaghan / Ilias Fourati
Ice dance	October 27, 2021	Formed	(Azerbaijan) Samantha Ritter / Daniel Brykalov	For Azerbaijan
Ice dance	October 27, 2021	Formed	(Italy) Leia Dozzi / Pietro Papetti	For Italy
Ice dance	November 3, 2021	Dissolved	(France) Adelina Galyavieva / Louis Thauron
Ice dance	November 3, 2021	Formed	(Italy) Elisabetta Leccardi / Mattia Dalla Torre
Pairs	November 17, 2021	Dissolved	(Russia) Viktoria Vasilieva / Nikita Volodin
Pairs	November 17, 2021	Formed	(Russia) Viktoria Vasilieva / Roman Zaporozhets
Pairs	November 29, 2021	Dissolved	(Russia) Diana Mukhametzianova / Vladislav Antonyshev
Ice dance	December 1, 2021	Dissolved	(Japan) Utana Yoshida / Seiji Urano
Ice dance	December 7, 2021	Dissolved	(Russia) Alena Kanysheva / Andrei Pylin	Kanysheva retired
Ice dance	December 15, 2021	Dissolved	(France) Julia Wagret / Pierre Souquet-Basiège
Ice dance	December 15, 2021	Dissolved	(Ukraine) Darya Popova / Volodymyr Byelikov
Ice dance	December 15, 2021	Formed	(Israel) Shira Ichilov / Volodymyr Byelikov	For Israel
Ice dance	December 23, 2021	Dissolved	(Japan) Haruno Yajima / Yoshimitsu Ikeda
Ice dance	January 4, 2022	Dissolved	(Spain) Sofía Val / Nikita Vitryanyuk
Pairs	January 22, 2022	Dissolved	(Canada) Justine Brasseur / Zachary Daleman	Brasseur retired
Ice dance	January 24, 2022	Dissolved	(Switzerland) Fiona Pernas / German Shamraev
Ice dance	January 28, 2022	Dissolved	(Russia) Svetlana Lizunova / Alexander Vakhnov
Ice dance	January 29, 2022	Dissolved	(Hungary) Katica Kedves / Fedor Sharonov
Pairs	January 31, 2022	Dissolved	(France) Océane Piegad / Rémi Belmonte
Pairs	January 31, 2022	Formed	(France) Océane Piegad / Denys Strekalin
Ice dance	January 31, 2022	Dissolved	(Germany) Anne-Marie Wolf / Max Liebers
Ice dance	February 3, 2022	Dissolved	(United States) Isabella Flores / Dimitry Tsarevski
Pairs	February 8, 2022	Dissolved	(Austria) Chloe Choinard / Livio Mayr
Pairs	February 15, 2022	Dissolved	(Croatia) Lana Petranović / Antonio Souza-Kordeiru	Souza-Kordeiru retired
Pairs	February 16, 2022	Dissolved	(France) Coline Keriven / Noël-Antoine Pierre
Ice dance	March 8, 2022	Dissolved	(Kazakhstan) Sofiya Lukinskaya / Danil Pak
Ice dance	March 10, 2022	Dissolved	(Japan) Ayumi Takanami / Shingo Nishiyama
Ice dance	March 10, 2022	Dissolved	(Italy) Nicole Calderari / Marco Cilli
Pairs	March 11, 2022	Dissolved	(Canada) Natasha Purich / Bryce Chudak	Chudak retired
Ice dance	March 19, 2022	Dissolved	(Russia) Annabelle Morozov / Andrei Bagin
Ice dance	March 19, 2022	Dissolved	(Russia) Elizaveta Shanaeva / Devid Naryzhnyy
Ice dance	March 19, 2022	Formed	(Russia) Annabelle Morozov / Devid Naryzhnyy
Pairs	March 20, 2022	Dissolved	(Hungary) Ioulia Chtchetinina / Márk Magyar
Pairs	March 21, 2022	Formed	(France) Coline Keriven / Tom Bouvart
Pairs	March 21, 2022	Dissolved	(United States) Audrey Lu / Misha Mitrofanov
Pairs	March 21, 2022	Formed	(United States) Hazel Collier / Misha Mitrofanov
Pairs	March 25, 2022	Dissolved	(Israel) Hailey Kops / Evgeni Krasnopolski	Krasnopolski retired
Ice dance	March 28, 2022	Dissolved	(Russia) Sofia Shevchenko / Igor Eremenko	Both separately retired
Ice dance	March 28, 2022	Dissolved	(Kazakhstan) Maxine Weatherby / Temirlan Yerzhanov
Pairs	March 31, 2022	Dissolved	(Finland) Milania Väänänen / Mikhail Akulov
Pairs	April 3, 2022	Dissolved	(United States) Jessica Calalang / Brian Johnson	Johnson retired
Pairs	April 3, 2022	Dissolved	(United States) Catherine Rivers / Timmy Chapman
Pairs	April 3, 2022	Formed	(United States) Catherine Rivers / Nathan Rensing
Ice dance	April 6, 2022	Dissolved	(Russia) Anzhelika Abachkina / Pavel Drozd
Ice dance	April 6, 2022	Formed	(Russia) Elizaveta Shanaeva / Pavel Drozd
Ice dance	April 6, 2022	Dissolved	(Russia) Elizaveta Pasechnik / Dmitry Blinov
Ice dance	April 6, 2022	Dissolved	(Russia) Arina Ushakova / Maxim Nekrasov
Ice dance	April 6, 2022	Formed	(Russia) Elizaveta Pasechnik / Maxim Nekrasov
Pairs	April 11, 2022	Dissolved	(United States) Isabelle Martins / Ryan Bedard
Pairs	April 12, 2022	Dissolved	(Spain) Dorota Broda / Pedro Betegón Martín	Betegón Martín retired
Ice dance	April 13, 2022	Dissolved	(Israel) Shira Ichilov / Volodymyr Byelikov
Pairs	April 17, 2022	Dissolved	(Russia) Polina Kostiukovich / Aleksei Briukhanov
Pairs	April 18, 2022	Dissolved	(Russia) Kseniia Akhanteva / Valerii Kolesov
Pairs	April 18, 2022	Dissolved	(Russia) Yasmina Kadyrova / Ivan Balchenko
Pairs	April 18, 2022	Formed	(Russia) Yasmina Kadyrova / Valerii Kolesov
Pairs	April 19, 2022	Dissolved	(Italy) Nicole Della Monica / Matteo Guarise	Della Monica retired
Ice dance	April 24, 2022	Dissolved	(Poland) Olivia Oliver / Joshua Andari
Ice dance	April 25, 2022	Dissolved	(United Kingdom) Sasha Fear / George Waddell
Pairs	April 28, 2022	Dissolved	(Russia) Alina Pepeleva / Roman Pleshkov
Ice dance	May 2, 2022	Dissolved	(Russia) Sofya Tyutyunina / Alexander Shustitskiy
Ice dance	May 3, 2022	Dissolved	(Canada) Natalie D'Alessandro / Bruce Waddell	D'Alessandro retired
Ice dance	May 7, 2022	Dissolved	(Australia) Chantelle Kerry / Andrew Dodds
Pairs	May 12, 2022	Dissolved	(United States) Alexandra Fakhroutdinov / Danny Neudecker
Pairs	May 12, 2022	Formed	(United States) Grace Hanns / Danny Neudecker
Ice dance	May 15, 2022	Dissolved	(United States) Sophia Eowyn Hsu / Vadym Kolesnik
Ice dance	May 15, 2022	Formed	(United States) Emilea Zingas / Vadym Kolesnik	For the United States
Ice dance	May 16, 2022	Dissolved	(Czech Republic) Denisa Cimlová / Vilém Hlavsa
Ice dance	May 17, 2022	Formed	(Russia) Sofya Tyutyunina / Andrei Bagin
Pairs	May 18, 2022	Dissolved	(Poland) Anna Hernik / Michał Woźniak
Pairs	May 18, 2022	Formed	(Canada) Natalia Zabiiako / Zachary Daleman	For Canada; Zabiiako unretired
Ice dance	May 18, 2022	Formed	(Canada) Emmy Bronsard / Jacob Richmond
Ice dance	May 18, 2022	Formed	(Poland) Olivia Oliver / Elliott Graham	For Poland
Ice dance	May 23, 2022	Dissolved	(Spain) Olivia Smart / Adrián Díaz	Díaz retired
Pairs	May 23, 2022	Formed	(Australia) Winter Deardorff / Ryan Dodds	For Australia
Pairs	June 2, 2022	Dissolved	(Russia) Iuliia Artemeva / Mikhail Nazarychev
Pairs	June 2, 2022	Dissolved	(Russia) Nadezhda Labazina / Alexei Svyatchenko
Pairs	June 2, 2022	Formed	(Russia) Iuliia Artemeva / Aleksei Briukhanov
Pairs	June 2, 2022	Formed	(Russia) Nadezhda Labazina / Mikhail Nazarychev
Ice dance	June 4, 2022	Formed	(Hungary) Lucy Hancock / Ilias Fourati	For Hungary
Ice dance	June 9, 2022	Dissolved	(Armenia) Tina Garabedian / Simon Proulx-Senecal	Garabedian retired
Pairs	June 19, 2022	Dissolved	(Italy) Alyssa Montan / Filippo Clerici
Pairs	June 19, 2022	Formed	(Finland) Milania Väänänen / Filippo Clerici	For Finland
Pairs	June 20, 2022	Dissolved	(Germany) Minerva Fabienne Hase / Nolan Seegert
Ice dance	June 20, 2022	Dissolved	(Germany) Katharina Müller / Tim Dieck
Ice dance	June 20, 2022	Formed	(Czech Republic) Denisa Cimlová / Joti Polizoakis	For the Czech Republic
Ice dance	June 27, 2022	Dissolved	(Belarus) Ekaterina Andreeva / Ivan Desyatov
Ice dance	June 27, 2022	Formed	(United States) Isabella Flores / Ivan Desyatov	For the United States

=== Retirements ===
Discipline	Date	Skater(s)	Refs
Women	July 4, 2021	(Russia) Anastasia Tarakanova
Women	July 13, 2021	(Netherlands) Lenne van Gorp
Ice dance	August 10, 2021	(Australia) Matilda Friend / William Badaoui
Women	August 19, 2021	(Switzerland) Noémie Bodenstein
Men	August 26, 2021	(Sweden) Illya Solomin
Women	August 26, 2021	(Sweden) Cassandra Johansson
Women	September 20, 2021	(Kazakhstan) Elizabet Tursynbaeva
Ice dance	September 29, 2021	(Israel) Laurent Abecassis
Women	October 4, 2021	(Japan) Yura Matsuda
Pairs	October 8, 2021	(United States) Tarah Kayne
Women	October 23, 2021	(Brazil) Isadora Williams
Women	November 5, 2021	(Russia) Serafima Sakhanovich
Women	November 16, 2021	(Hungary) Ivett Tóth
Men	November 23, 2021	(Philippines) Christopher Caluza
Men	November 27, 2021	(France) Romain Ponsart
Men	December 6, 2021	(United Kingdom) Peter James Hallam
Ice dance	December 7, 2021	(Russia) Alena Kanysheva
Men	December 8, 2021	(Netherlands) Thomas Kennes
Women	January 5, 2022	(Germany) Lea Johanna Dastich
Women	January 5, 2022	(Russia) Ksenia Tsibinova
Women	January 14, 2022	(Canada) Emily Bausback
Pairs	January 22, 2022	(Canada) Justine Brasseur
Women	January 25, 2022	(Canada) Aurora Cotop
Ice dance	January 27, 2022	(Japan) Kiria Hirayama / Aru Tateno
Men	February 8, 2022	(Czech Republic) Michal Březina
Pairs	February 15, 2022	(Croatia) Antonio Souza-Kordeiru
Women	March 6, 2022	(United Kingdom) Karly Robertson
Pairs	March 11, 2022	(Canada) Bryce Chudak
Pairs	March 18, 2022	(Switzerland) Jessica Pfund / Joshua Santillan
Pairs	March 24, 2022	(Austria) Miriam Ziegler / Severin Kiefer
Pairs	March 24, 2022	(United Kingdom) Zoe Jones / Christopher Boyadji
Pairs	March 25, 2022	(Israel) Evgeni Krasnopolski
Women	March 26, 2022	(Japan) Satoko Miyahara
Ice dance	March 26, 2022	(United States) Madison Hubbell / Zachary Donohue
Pairs	April 3, 2022	(United States) Brian Johnson
Men	April 5, 2022	(United States) Ryan Dunk
Men	April 7, 2022	(Finland) Roman Galay
Ice dance	April 8, 2022	(Russia) Igor Eremenko
Women	April 9, 2022	(United States) Alysa Liu
Men	April 11, 2022	(Japan) Keiji Tanaka
Pairs	April 12, 2022	(Spain) Pedro Betegón Martín
Ice dance	April 15, 2022	(Russia) Sofia Shevchenko
Women	April 18, 2022	(United Kingdom) Danielle Harrison
Pairs	April 19, 2022	(Italy) Nicole Della Monica
Women	April 29, 2022	(Russia) Sofia Samodurova
Women	May 3, 2022	(Finland) Laura Karhunen
Ice dance	May 3, 2022	(Canada) Natalie D'Alessandro
Women	May 5, 2022	(Chinese Taipei) Emmy Ma
Women	May 17, 2022	(Netherlands) Niki Wories
Men	May 20, 2022	(Canada) Nam Nguyen
Ice dance	May 23, 2022	(Spain) Adrián Díaz
Men	May 24, 2022	(France) Adrien Tesson
Men	May 24, 2022	(Israel) Alexei Bychenko
Women	May 24, 2022	(Hungary) Bernadett Szigeti
Ice dance	May 26, 2022	(Russia) Svetlana Lizunova
Ice dance	May 30, 2022	(Spain) Sara Hurtado / Kirill Khaliavin
Ice dance	June 2, 2022	(Russia) Anastasia Skoptsova / Kirill Aleshin
Pairs	June 7, 2022	(Canada) Kirsten Moore-Towers / Michael Marinaro
Ice dance	June 9, 2022	(Armenia) Tina Garabedian
Pairs	June 13, 2022	(United States) Ashley Cain-Gribble / Timothy LeDuc
Men	June 23, 2022	(Canada) Joseph Phan

=== Coaching changes ===
Discipline	Date	Skater(s)	From	To	Refs
Pairs	July 2, 2021	(United States) Alexandra Fakhroutdinov / Danny Neudecker	Dalilah Sappenfield	Drew Meekins
Men	July 16, 2021	(United States) Dinh Tran	Dee Goldstein, Jeremy Abbott	Todd Eldredge
Ice dance (Note: Iwano formerly trained in women's singles.)	July 18, 2021	(Japan) Moa Iwano	Utako Nagamitsu	Emi Hirai, Marien de la Asuncion
Women	August 9, 2021	(South Korea) Ji Seo-yeon	Hong Ye-seul	Tammy Gambill, Kim Soo-hyun
Women	August 18, 2021	(Belgium) Loena Hendrickx	Carine Herrygers	Jorik Hendrickx, Adam Solya
Men	August 24, 2021	(Czech Republic) Leonid Sviridenko	Evgeni Plushenko, Sergei Rozanov	Sergei Rozanov, Lorenzo Magri, Angelina Turenko
Women	September 8, 2021	(Japan) Rika Kihira	Stéphane Lambiel, Mie Hamada	Brian Orser, Tracy Wilson
Women	September 12, 2021	(Poland) Ekaterina Kurakova	Lorenzo Magri, Brian Orser, Tracy Wilson	Lorenzo Magri, Angelina Turenko
Men	September 24, 2021	(Japan) Sōta Yamamoto	Yoshinori Onishi	Machiko Yamada, Mihoko Higuchi
Ice dance	September 29, 2021	(United States) Emily Bratti / Ian Somerville	Elena Novak, Alexei Kiliakov, Dmytri Ilin, Ramil Sarkulov	Greg Zuerlein, Charlie White, Tanith White, Dmytri Ilin
Men	October 14, 2021	(Russia) Egor Rukhin	Elena Buianova	Eteri Tutberidze, Sergei Dudakov, Daniil Gleikhengauz
Women	October 23, 2021	(France) Maé-Bérénice Méité	Silvia Fontana, John Zimmerman	Lorenzo Magri, Silvia Fontana
Women	November 22, 2021	(United States) Alysa Liu	Massimo Scali, Jeremy Abbott	Christy Krall, Drew Meekins, Viktor Pfeifer
Pairs	November 29, 2021	(Russia) Diana Mukhametzianova	Nina Mozer, Arina Ushakova, Filip Tarasov, Vladislav Zhovnirski	Pavel Sliusarenko, Egor Zakroev, Valentina Tiukova
Women	December 1, 2021	(United States) Gabriella Izzo	Mark Mitchell, Peter Johansson	Olga Ganicheva, Aleksey Letov
Ice dance	December 1, 2021	(Russia) Alexandra Stepanova / Ivan Bukin	Irina Zhuk, Alexander Svinin	Irina Zhuk, Alexander Svinin, Nikolai Morozov
Men	December 31, 2021	(Russia) Egor Rukhin	Eteri Tutberidze, Sergei Dudakov, Daniil Gleikhengauz	Evgeni Plushenko
Women	March 2, 2022	(Russia) Alena Kostornaia	Eteri Tutberidze, Sergei Dudakov, Daniil Gleikhengauz	Elena Buianova
Ice dance	March 13, 2022	(United States) Molly Cesanek / Yehor Yehorov	Elena Novak, Alexei Kiliakov, Ruslan Goncharov, Jimmie Manners	Charlie White, Tanith White, Greg Zuerlein
Women	March 25, 2022	(United States) Alysa Liu	Christy Krall, Drew Meekins, Viktor Pfeifer	Viktor Pfeifer, Phillip DiGuglielmo
Ice dance	April 6, 2022	(Russia) Elizaveta Shanaeva	Irina Zhuk, Alexander Svinin	Alexander Zhulin, Petr Durnev
Pairs	April 18, 2022	(Russia) Valerii Kolesov	Dmitri Savin, Fedor Klimov	Tamara Moskvina, Artur Minchuk
Women	April 21, 2022	(Japan) Mana Kawabe	Mie Hamada, Yamato Tamura, Satsuki Muramoto, Hiroaki Sato, Haruko Okamoto	Mihoko Higuchi
Ice dance	May 10, 2022	(United States) Katarina Wolfkostin / Jeffrey Chen	Igor Shpilband, Pasquale Camerlengo, Adrienne Lenda, Natalia Deller	Charlie White, Greg Zuerlein, Tanith White
Ice dance	May 17, 2022	(Russia) Sofya Tyutyunina	Ekaterina Rubleva, Ivan Shefer	Alexander Zhulin
Ice dance	May 17, 2022	(Russia) Andrei Bagin	Nikolai Morozov	Alexander Zhulin
Men	May 18, 2022	(Canada) Joseph Phan	Brian Orser, Tracy Wilson, Ghislain Briand	Lee Barkell
Women	June 2, 2022	(Russia) Sofia Samodelkina	Sergei Davydov	Svetlana Sokolovskaya
Men	June 4, 2022	(United States) Camden Pulkinen	Tammy Gambill, Damon Allen	Alex Johnson, Rafael Arutyunyan
Women	June 9, 2022	(Russia) Elizaveta Nugumanova	Evgeni Rukavicin	TBD
Men	June 10, 2022	(France) Adam Siao Him Fa	Laurent Depouilly, Nathalie Depouilly	Cédric Tour, Rodolphe Marechal
Women	June 24, 2022	(Russia) Anastasia Zinina	Evgeni Plushenko	Alexei Vasilevsky
Ice dance	June 30, 2022	(Russia) Diana Davis / Gleb Smolkin	Igor Shpilband, Pasquale Camerlengo, Adrienne Lenda, Natalia Deller	Alexei Kiliakov, Elena Novak

=== Nationality changes ===
Discipline	Date	Skater(s)	From	To	Other info	Refs
Ice dance	July 14, 2021	Hannah Lim / Ye Quan	Canada	South Korea
Pairs	July 25, 2021	Mikhail Akulov	Switzerland	Finland	Partnering with Milania Väänänen
Ice dance	July 27, 2021	Ekaterina Andreeva / Ivan Desyatov	Russia	Belarus
Ice dance	August 1, 2021	Jasmine Tessari	Italy	Switzerland	Partnering with Stéphane Walker
Pairs	August 3, 2021	Karina Safina	Russia	Georgia	Partnering with Luka Berulava
Ice dance	August 3, 2021	Aleksandr Gnedin	Russia	Estonia	Partnering with Darja Netjaga
Ice dance	August 3, 2021	Dmitri Parkhomenko	Russia	Georgia	Partnering with Yulia Bitadze-Lebedeva
Pairs	August 16, 2021	Maria Chernyshova	Russia	Australia	Partnering with Harley Windsor
Pairs	August 17, 2021	Alexander Korovin	Russia	Philippines	Partnering with Isabella Gamez
Men	August 20, 2021	Leonid Sviridenko	Russia	Czech Republic
Women	August 31, 2021	Anastasiia Gubanova	Russia	Georgia
Women	August 31, 2021	Maria Talalaikina	Russia	Italy	Release granted from June 1, 2022
Ice dance	September 6, 2021	Katarina DelCamp	United States	Great Britain	Partnering with Billy Wilson French
Ice dance	September 17, 2021	Grigory Smirnov	Russia	United States	Partnering with Avonley Nguyen
Pairs	September 20, 2021	Maria Pavlova	Russia	Hungary	Partnering with Balázs Nagy
Pairs	September 20, 2021	Balázs Nagy	United States	Hungary	Partnering with Maria Pavlova; Previously represented Hungary
Ice dance	September 29, 2021	Emily Bratti	France	United States	Partnering with Ian Somerville; Previously represented the United States
Ice dance	October 4, 2021	Raffaella Koncius	Denmark	United States	Partnering with Alexey Shchepetov; Previously represented the United States
Ice dance	October 4, 2021	Uladzislau Palkhouski	Belarus	United States	Partnering with Cayla Cottrell
Men	October 10, 2021	Artur Dmitriev	Russia	United States
Ice dance	October 27, 2021	Leia Dozzi	Hungary	Italy	Partnering with Pietro Papetti
Ice dance	October 27, 2021	Samantha Ritter / Daniel Brykalov	United States	Azerbaijan	Never represented the United States together Brykalov previously represented Azerbaijan
Ice dance	November 11, 2021	Elizabeth Tkachenko / Alexei Kiliakov	United States	Israel
Ice dance	December 15, 2021	Volodymyr Byelikov	Ukraine	Israel	Partnering with Shira Ichilov
Ice dance	January 28, 2022	Victoria Manni / Carlo Röthlisberger	Switzerland	Italy	Manni previously represented Italy
Ice dance	May 15, 2022	Emilea Zingas	Cyprus	United States	Partnering with Vadym Kolesnik; Previously represented the United States
Pairs	May 18, 2022	Natalia Zabiiako	Russia	Canada	Partnering with Zachary Daleman
Ice dance	May 18, 2022	Elliott Graham	Canada	Poland	Partnering with Olivia Oliver
Pairs	May 23, 2022	Winter Deardorff	United States	Australia	Partnering with Ryan Dodds
Ice dance	June 4, 2022	Lucy Hancock	Great Britain	Hungary	Partnering with Ilias Fourati
Pairs	June 19, 2022	Filippo Clerici	Italy	Finland	Partnering with Milania Väänänen; Eligible to compete internationally from the 2023–24 season
Ice dance	June 20, 2022	Joti Polizoakis	Germany	Czech Republic	Partnering with Denisa Cimlová
Ice dance	June 27, 2022	Ivan Desyatov	Belarus	United States	Partnering with Isabella Flores

== Competitions ==
Several competitions were rescheduled from the previous season due to the COVID-19 pandemic.

Scheduled competitions:

Key

Winter Olympics	ISU Championships	Grand Prix/Junior Grand Prix	Challenger Series	Other international

Date	Event	Type	Level	Disc.	Location	Results
2021
August 12–15	Cranberry Cup International	Other int.	Sen.–Jun.	M/W/P	Norwood, Massachusetts, United States	Details
August 12–15	Lake Placid Ice Dance International	Other int.	Sen.–Jun.	D	Norwood, Massachusetts, United States	Details
August 18–21	JGP France I	Grand Prix	Junior	M/W/D	Courchevel, France	Details
August 25–28	JGP France II (Note: Skate Canada was scheduled to host the second JGP event in Edmonton, Alberta, but cancelled the event due to uncertainties surrounding the COVID-19 pandemic. The Fédération Française des Sports de Glace instead hosted two separate JGP events in consecutive weeks. The pairs event scheduled for JGP Canada was reallotted from the second JGP France to JGP Poland.)	Grand Prix	Junior	M/W/D	Courchevel, France	Details
September 1–4	JGP Slovakia	Grand Prix	Junior	All	Košice, Slovakia	Details
September 9–10	John Nicks Pairs Challenge	Other int.	Sen.–Jun.	P	New York City, New York, United States	Details
September 10–12	Lombardia Trophy	Challenger	Senior	M/W/D	Bergamo, Italy	Details
September 11–12	Lombardia Trophy	Other int.	Senior	P	Bergamo, Italy	Details
September 15–18	JGP Russia	Grand Prix	Junior	All	Krasnoyarsk, Russia	Details
September 15–18	U.S. Classic	Other int.	Senior	M/W/D	Norwood, Massachusetts, United States	Details
September 16–18	Autumn Classic	Challenger	Senior	W/P/D (Note: The pairs segment was not originally scheduled as part of the Challenger Series event, but was later added due to the reduced number of entries in other disciplines.)	Pierrefonds, Quebec, Canada	Details
September 17–18	Autumn Classic	Other int.	Senior	M	Pierrefonds, Quebec, Canada	Details
September 22–25	JGP Slovenia	Grand Prix	Junior	M/W/D	Ljubljana, Slovenia	Details
September 22–25	Nebelhorn Trophy	Challenger	Senior	All	Oberstdorf, Germany	Details
Sept. 29 – Oct. 2	JGP Poland	Grand Prix	Junior	All	Gdańsk, Poland	Details
October 2	Japan Open	Other int. (Note: Originally scheduled as an ISU international event, the competition featured two teams composed entirely of domestic Japanese skaters, rather than the traditional three teams drawn from their respective regions (Europe, Japan, and North America), due to pandemic-related travel restrictions. Only senior amateur skaters were included.)	Senior	M/W	Saitama, Japan	Details
October 6–9	JGP Austria	Grand Prix	Junior	All	Linz, Austria	Details
October 7–10	Finlandia Trophy	Challenger	Senior	All	Espoo, Finland	Details
October 13–17	Asian Open Trophy	Other int. (Note: Asian Open Trophy was originally scheduled as a Challenger Series event; however, due to failure to meet the minimum entry requirements, the event was re-classified as an International event in the singles disciplines, while pairs and ice dance had domestic competitors only.)	Senior	All	Beijing, China	Details
October 14–17	Budapest Trophy	Other int.	Sen.–Jun.	All	Budapest, Hungary	Details
October 14–17	Ice Star	Other int.	Sen.–Nov.	All	Minsk, Belarus	Details 1, 2
October 15–17	Mezzaluna Cup	Other int.	Sen.–Nov.	D	Mentana, Italy	Details
October 20–24	Viktor Petrenko Cup	Other int.	Sen.–Nov.	M/W/D	Odesa, Ukraine	Details
October 20–24	Trophée Métropole Nice Côte d'Azur	Other int.	Sen.–Jun.	All	Nice, France	Details
October 22–24	Skate America	Grand Prix	Senior	All	Las Vegas, Nevada, United States	Details
October 27–30	Autumn Talents Cup Ukraine	Other int.	Senior; Junior	M/W/P; W/D	Brovary, Ukraine	Details
October 28–31	Denis Ten Memorial Challenge	Challenger	Senior	M/W/D	Nur-Sultan, Kazakhstan (Note: Originally scheduled to be held in Almaty.)	Details
October 28–31	Denis Ten Memorial Challenge	Other int.	Senior; Junior	P All	Nur-Sultan, Kazakhstan	Details
October 28–31	Tirnavia Ice Cup	Other int.	Sen.–Nov. Junior	M/W; P	Trnava, Slovakia	Details
October 29–31	Skate Canada	Grand Prix	Senior	All	Vancouver, British Columbia, Canada	Details
November 3–7	Volvo Open Cup	Other int.	Sen.–Nov.	M/W/D	Riga, Latvia	Details 1, 2
November 4–7	NRW Trophy	Other int.	Sen.–Nov.	All	Dortmund, Germany	Details
November 5–7	Gran Premio d'Italia (Note: Added after the cancellation of Cup of China.)	Grand Prix	Senior	All	Turin, Italy	Details
November 5–7	Pavel Roman Memorial	Other int.	Sen.–Nov.	D	Olomouc, Czech Republic	Details
November 6–7	Tayside Trophy	Other int.	Sen.–Nov. Senior	M/W; P	Dundee, Scotland, United Kingdom	Details
November 9–14	Ice Challenge	Other int.	Sen.–Jun. Jun.–Nov. Junior	P M/W; D	Graz, Austria	Details 1, 2
November 11–14	Cup of Austria	Challenger	Senior	M/W/D	Graz, Austria	Details
November 12–14	NHK Trophy	Grand Prix	Senior	All	Tokyo, Japan	Details
November 16–18	Tallinn Trophy	Other int.	Sen.–Jun.	M/W	Tallinn, Estonia	Details
November 18–21	Warsaw Cup	Challenger	Senior	All	Warsaw, Poland	Details
November 18–21	Skate Celje	Other int.	Sen.–Nov.	M/W	Celje, Slovenia	Details
November 19–21	Internationaux de France	Grand Prix	Senior	All	Grenoble, France	Details
November 24–28	Open d'Andorra	Other int.	Sen.–Nov.	M/W/D	Canillo, Andorra	Details
November 26–28	Rostelecom Cup	Grand Prix	Senior	All	Sochi, Russia	Details
December 6–10	Santa Claus Cup	Other int.	Sen.–Nov.	M/W/D	Budapest, Hungary	Details
December 8–11	Golden Spin of Zagreb	Challenger	Senior	All	Sisak, Croatia (Note: Originally scheduled to be held in Zagreb.)	Details
2022
January 10–16	Europeans	Championship	Senior	All	Tallinn, Estonia	Details
January 13–14 (Note: Originally scheduled for November 5–7.)	IceLab International Cup	Other int.	Senior; Junior; Novice	W/P; M/W/P; M/W	Bergamo, Italy	Details
January 18–23	Four Continents	Championship	Senior	All	Tallinn, Estonia (Note: Originally scheduled to be held in Tianjin, China. Relocated to the venue for the European Championships after no non-European ISU members applied to host the event.)	Details
January 18–23	Bavarian Open	Other int.	Sen.–Nov.	All	Oberstdorf, Germany	Details
January 19–23	Europa Cup Skate Helena	Other int.	Sen.–Nov.	M/W	Belgrade, Serbia	Details
January 26–30	The Nordics – Nordic Open	Other int.	Sen.–Nov.	M/W	Hørsholm, Denmark	Details
February 1–6	Sofia Trophy	Other int.	Sen.–Nov.	M/W	Sofia, Bulgaria	Details
February 4–20	Winter Olympics	Olympics	Senior	All	Beijing, China	Details
February 4–6	Egna Dance Trophy	Other int.	Sen.–Nov.	D	Egna, Italy	Details
February 4–6	Reykjavik International Games	Other int.	Sen.–Nov.	M/W	Reykjavík, Iceland	Details
February 5–6	Merano Ice Trophy	Other int.	Sen.–Nov.	M/W	Merano, Italy	Details
February 10–13	Winter Star	Other int.	Sen.–Jun.	All	Minsk, Belarus	Details
February 11–13 (Note: Originally scheduled for February 3–6.)	Dragon Trophy & Tivoli Cup	Other int.	Sen.–Nov.	M/W	Ljubljana, Slovenia	Details
February 11–13	Jégvirág Cup	Other int.	Sen.–Jun. Novice	M/W/D; M/W	Miskolc, Hungary	Details
February 23–26	Bellu Memorial	Other int.	Sen.–Nov.	M/W	Otopeni, Romania	Details
February 24–27	Challenge Cup	Other int.	Senior; Jun.–Nov.	All; M/W	Tilburg, Netherlands (Note: Originally scheduled to be held in The Hague.)	Details
March 3–4	Tallinnk Hotels Cup	Other int.	Sen.–Jun.	M/W	Tallinn, Estonia	Details
March 18–20	Coupe du Printemps	Other int.	Sen.–Nov.	M/W	Kockelscheuer, Luxembourg	Details
March 20–25 (Note: Originally scheduled for February 6–13, 2021 and rescheduled for December 11–18, 2021.)	European Youth Olympic Festival	Other int.	Junior (Note: To be eligible, skaters must have been born between July 1, 2004 and June 30, 2006.)	M/W	Vuokatti, Finland	Details
March 21–27	Worlds	Championship	Senior	All	Montpellier, France	Details
April 7–10	Egna Spring Trophy	Other int.	Sen.–Nov.	M/W	Egna, Italy	Details
April 8–10 (Note: Originally scheduled for April 17–18, 2021.)	Kurbada Cup	Other int.	Jun.–Nov.	M/W	Riga, Latvia	Details
April 13–17 (Note: Originally scheduled for March 7–13 in Sofia, Bulgaria. Postponed and relocated to Tallinn as the Estonian Skating Union made the sole bid to host.)	Junior Worlds	Championship	Junior	All	Tallinn, Estonia	Details
April 13–17 (Note: Originally scheduled for March 13–17.)	Triglav Trophy & Narcisa Cup	Other int.	Sen.–Nov.	M/W	Jesenice, Slovenia	Details

=== Cancelled ===
Several competitions were cancelled by either the ISU, the host federation, or the local government due to the COVID-19 pandemic, some for a second consecutive season. Several others were cancelled following the Russian invasion of Ukraine.

Date	Event	Type	Level	Disc.	Location	Results
2021
September 1–4 (Note: Originally scheduled for February 17–20, 2021 and rescheduled for September 1–4, 2021.)	IISF Ice Mall Cup	Other int.	Sen.–Jun. Novice	All; M/W	Eilat, Israel	
Sept. 30 – Oct. 2	Nepela Memorial	Challenger	Senior	M/W/D	Bratislava, Slovakia	
Sept. 30 – Oct. 2	Nepela Memorial	Other int.	Senior	P	Bratislava, Slovakia	
October 28–31	Crystal Skate	Other int.	Sen.–Nov.	M/W	Bucharest, Romania	
October 28–31	Golden Bear	Other int.	Sen.–Jun. Novice	M/W/P; M/W	Zagreb, Croatia	
November 5–7	Cup of China (Note: Replaced by the Gran Premio d'Italia.)	Grand Prix	Senior	All	Chongqing, China	
November 23–28	Denkova-Staviski Cup	Other int.	Sen.–Nov.	M/W	Sofia, Bulgaria	
December 3–5	Kaunas Amber Cup	Other int.	Sen.–Nov.	M/W	Kaunas, Lithuania	
December 7–11	Bosphorus Istanbul Cup	Other int.	Sen.–Nov.	M/W/D	Istanbul, Turkey	
December 8–11	Golden Spin of Zagreb	Other int.	Junior	All	Sisak, Croatia	
December 9–12	Grand Prix Final	Grand Prix	Sen.–Jun.	All	Osaka, Japan	
December 9–12	Christmas Magic	Other int.	Sen.–Nov.	M/W	Bucharest, Romania	
December 10–12	Latvia International Competition	Other int.	Sen.–Nov.	M/W	Mārupe, Latvia	
December 11–21 (Note: Originally scheduled for January 21–31, 2021 and rescheduled before being cancelled definitively on November 29, 2021.)	Winter Universiade	Other int.	Senior	M/W/D	Lucerne, Switzerland	
December 17–19	Grand Prix of Bratislava	Other int.	Senior; Jun.–Nov.	All; M/W/P	Bratislava, Slovakia	
2022
January 5–9	Mentor Toruń Cup	Other int.	Sen.–Nov.	M/W/D	Toruń, Poland	
January 14–16 (Note: Originally scheduled for November 5–7.)	Bergamo on Ice Cup	Other int.	Novice	M/W	Bergamo, Italy	
January 26–30	Maria Olszewska Memorial	Other int.	Senior; Jun.–Nov.	All; M/W/D	Łódź, Poland	
February 4–6	LuMi Dance Trophy	Other int.	Senior; Jun.–Nov.	All; P/D	Odesa, Ukraine	
March 3–6 (Note: Originally scheduled for January 12–16.)	EduSport Trophy	Other int.	Sen.–Nov.	M/W	Bucharest, Romania	
Mar. 29 – Apr. 1	Spring Talents Cup Ukraine	Other int.	Sen.–Nov.	M/W	Brovary, Ukraine	
April 7–10	Black Sea Ice Cup	Other int.	Sen.–Nov.	M/W	Kranevo, Bulgaria	
April 8–10 (Note: Originally scheduled for February 25–27.)	Sarajevo Open	Other int.	Sen.–Nov.	M/W/P	Sarajevo, Bosnia and Herzegovina	
April 13–17	Ice Cup	Other int.	Sen.–Nov.	All	Minsk, Belarus	

== International medalists ==
=== Men ===
Olympic Games
Competition	Gold	Silver	Bronze	Results
Winter Olympics	(United States) Nathan Chen	(Japan) Yuma Kagiyama	(Japan) Shoma Uno	Details
Championships
Competition	Gold	Silver	Bronze	Results
Europeans	(Russia) Mark Kondratiuk	(Italy) Daniel Grassl	(Latvia) Deniss Vasiļjevs	Details
Four Continents	(South Korea) Cha Jun-hwan	(Japan) Kazuki Tomono	(Japan) Kao Miura	Details
Worlds	(Japan) Shoma Uno	(Japan) Yuma Kagiyama	(United States) Vincent Zhou	Details
Junior Worlds	(United States) Ilia Malinin	(Kazakhstan) Mikhail Shaidorov	(Japan) Tatsuya Tsuboi	Details
Grand Prix
Competition	Gold	Silver	Bronze	Results
Skate America	(United States) Vincent Zhou	(Japan) Shoma Uno	(United States) Nathan Chen	Details
Skate Canada	(United States) Nathan Chen	(United States) Jason Brown	(Russia) Evgeni Semenenko	Details
Gran Premio d'Italia	(Japan) Yuma Kagiyama	(Russia) Mikhail Kolyada	(Italy) Daniel Grassl	Details
NHK Trophy	(Japan) Shoma Uno	(United States) Vincent Zhou	(South Korea) Cha Jun-hwan	Details
Internationaux de France	(Japan) Yuma Kagiyama	(Japan) Shun Sato	(United States) Jason Brown	Details
Rostelecom Cup	(Georgia (country)) Morisi Kvitelashvili	(Russia) Mikhail Kolyada	(Japan) Kazuki Tomono	Details
Grand Prix Final	Competition cancelled			
Junior Grand Prix
Competition	Gold	Silver	Bronze	Results
JGP France I	(United States) Ilia Malinin	(United States) Lucas Broussard	(France) François Pitot	Details
JGP France II	(Canada) Wesley Chiu	(Estonia) Arlet Levandi	(United Kingdom) Edward Appleby	Details
JGP Slovakia	(Russia) Kirill Sarnovskiy	(Russia) Ilya Yablokov	(United States) William Annis	Details
JGP Russia	(Russia) Gleb Lutfullin	(Russia) Egor Rukhin	(Canada) Wesley Chiu	Details
JGP Slovenia	(Russia) Ilya Yablokov	(Estonia) Arlet Levandi	(United States) Matthew Nielsen	Details
JGP Poland	(Russia) Gleb Lutfullin	(Kazakhstan) Mikhail Shaidorov	(Russia) Egor Rukhin	Details
JGP Austria	(United States) Ilia Malinin	(Russia) Artem Kovalev	(Russia) Kirill Sarnovskiy	Details
JGP Final	Competition cancelled			
Challenger Series
Competition	Gold	Silver	Bronze	Results
Lombardia Trophy	(Italy) Daniel Grassl	(France) Adam Siao Him Fa	(Georgia (country)) Morisi Kvitelashvili	Details
Nebelhorn Trophy	(United States) Vincent Zhou	(France) Adam Siao Him Fa	(Russia) Mark Kondratiuk	Details
Finlandia Trophy	(United States) Jason Brown	(Russia) Mikhail Kolyada	(Russia) Dmitri Aliev	Details
Denis Ten Memorial	(Russia) Petr Gumennik	(Russia) Mark Kondratiuk	(Russia) Andrei Mozalev	Details
Cup of Austria	(Georgia (country)) Nika Egadze	(Japan) Lucas Tsuyoshi Honda	(United States) Ilia Malinin	Details
Warsaw Cup	(Japan) Sōta Yamamoto	(Italy) Daniel Grassl	(Russia) Petr Gumennik	Details
Golden Spin	(Canada) Keegan Messing	(Russia) Andrei Mozalev	(United States) Jimmy Ma	Details
Other international
Competition	Gold	Silver	Bronze	Results
Cranberry Cup	(United States) Vincent Zhou	(United States) Jimmy Ma	(United States) Maxim Naumov	Details
U.S. Classic	(Czech Republic) Michal Březina	(United States) Jimmy Ma	(United States) Eric Sjoberg	Details
Autumn Classic	(Canada) Conrad Orzel	(Canada) Bennet Toman	(Canada) Beres Clements	Details
Asian Open Trophy	(Japan) Yuma Kagiyama	(Japan) Shun Sato	(China) Jin Boyang	Details
Ice Star	(Russia) Andrei Mozalev	(Belarus) Konstantin Milyukov	(Belarus) Alexander Lebedev	Details
Budapest Trophy	(Italy) Matteo Rizzo	(Russia) Dmitri Aliev	(Russia) Alexander Samarin	Details
Trophée Métropole Nice	(France) Luc Economides	(France) Romain Ponsart	(Monaco) Davide Lewton Brain	Details
Viktor Petrenko Cup	(Latvia) Daniels Kočkers	(Ukraine) Kyrylo Lishenko	(Ukraine) Sergii Sokolov	Details
Autumn Talents Cup	(Latvia) Daniels Kočkers	(Ukraine) Glib Smotrov	(Ukraine) Andrii Kokura	Details
Tirnavia Ice Cup	(Slovakia) Adam Hagara	(Bulgaria) Beat Schümperli	(Switzerland) Micha Steffen	Details
Volvo Open Cup	(Georgia (country)) Irakli Maysuradze	(Estonia) Aleksandr Selevko	(Georgia (country)) Nika Egadze	Details
NRW Trophy	(Switzerland) Lukas Britschgi	(Sweden) Nikolaj Majorov	(Germany) Nikita Starostin	Details
Tayside Trophy	(Austria) Maurizio Zandron	(France) Romain Ponsart	(United Kingdom) Peter James Hallam	Details
Tallinn Trophy	(Estonia) Aleksandr Selevko	(Finland) Valtter Virtanen	(Armenia) Slavik Hayrapetyan	Details
Skate Celje	(Austria) Maurizio Zandron	(Italy) Alessandro Fadini	(Slovakia) Adam Hagara	Details
Open d'Andorra	(Spain) Tomàs-Llorenç Guarino Sabaté	(Austria) Luc Maierhofer	(Spain) Pablo García	Details
Santa Claus Cup	(Italy) Nikolaj Memola	(Russia) Artem Kovalev	(Slovakia) Adam Hagara	Details
Bavarian Open	(Poland) Vladimir Samoilov	(Austria) Luc Maierhofer	(Germany) Kai Jagoda	Details
Skate Helena	(Slovakia) Adam Hagara	(Hungary) Aleksandr Vlasenko	(Bulgaria) Beat Schümperli	Details
Nordic Open	(Finland) Valtter Virtanen	(Poland) Kornel Witkowski	(Sweden) Oliver Praetorius	Details
Sofia Trophy	(Austria) Maurizio Zandron	(Monaco) Davide Lewton Brain	(Kazakhstan) Dias Jirenbayev	Details
Reykjavik Int. Games	(Finland) Lauri Lankila	No other competitors		Details
Merano Ice Trophy	(Italy) Gabriele Frangipani	(Austria) Luc Maierhofer	(Croatia) Jari Kessler	Details
Winter Star	(Belarus) Yauhenii Puzanau	(Belarus) Alexander Lebedev	(Kazakhstan) Rakhat Bralin	Details
Dragon Trophy	(Monaco) Davide Lewton Brain	(France) Corentin Spinar	(Slovakia) Michael Neuman	Details
Jégvirág Cup	(Hungary) Aleksandr Vlasenko	(Croatia) Jari Kessler	(Finland) Valtter Virtanen	Details
Challenge Cup	(United States) Ilia Malinin	(Estonia) Mihhail Selevko	(Japan) Sōta Yamamoto	Details
Bellu Memorial	(France) Luc Economides	(Italy) Gabriele Frangipani	(Austria) Maurizio Zandron	Details
Tallink Hotels Cup	(Estonia) Arlet Levandi	(France) Landry Le May	(Sweden) Gabriel Folkesson	Details
Coupe du Printemps	(Japan) Kazuki Tomono	(Japan) Tatsuya Tsuboi	(France) Landry Le May	Details
EYOF	(Estonia) Arlet Levandi	(Italy) Raffaele Francesco Zich	(Sweden) Casper Johansson	Details
Egna Spring Trophy	(Italy) Gabriele Frangipani	(Japan) Sena Miyake	(United States) Liam Kapeikis	Details
Triglav Trophy	(Italy) Emanuele Indelicato	(Republic of Ireland) Samuel McAllister	(Slovenia) David Sedej	Details

=== Women ===
Olympic Games
Competition	Gold	Silver	Bronze	Results
Winter Olympics	(Russia) Anna Shcherbakova	(Russia) Alexandra Trusova	(Japan) Kaori Sakamoto	Details
Championships
Competition	Gold	Silver	Bronze	Results
Europeans	(Russia) Kamila Valieva	(Russia) Anna Shcherbakova	(Russia) Alexandra Trusova	Details
Four Continents	(Japan) Mai Mihara	(South Korea) Lee Hae-in	(South Korea) Kim Ye-lim	Details
Worlds	(Japan) Kaori Sakamoto	(Belgium) Loena Hendrickx	(United States) Alysa Liu	Details
Junior Worlds	(United States) Isabeau Levito	(South Korea) Shin Ji-a	(United States) Lindsay Thorngren	Details
Grand Prix
Competition	Gold	Silver	Bronze	Results
Skate America	(Russia) Alexandra Trusova	(Russia) Daria Usacheva	(South Korea) You Young	Details
Skate Canada	(Russia) Kamila Valieva	(Russia) Elizaveta Tuktamysheva	(Russia) Alena Kostornaia	Details
Gran Premio d'Italia	(Russia) Anna Shcherbakova	(Russia) Maiia Khromykh	(Belgium) Loena Hendrickx	Details
NHK Trophy	(Japan) Kaori Sakamoto	(Japan) Mana Kawabe	(South Korea) You Young	Details
Internationaux de France	(Russia) Anna Shcherbakova	(Russia) Alena Kostornaia	(Japan) Wakaba Higuchi	Details
Rostelecom Cup	(Russia) Kamila Valieva	(Russia) Elizaveta Tuktamysheva	(Russia) Maiia Khromykh	Details
Grand Prix Final	Competition cancelled			
Junior Grand Prix
Competition	Gold	Silver	Bronze	Results
JGP France I	(United States) Lindsay Thorngren	(Canada) Kaiya Ruiter	(United States) Clare Seo	Details
JGP France II	(United States) Isabeau Levito	(South Korea) Kim Chae-yeon	(Canada) Kaiya Ruiter	Details
JGP Slovakia	(Russia) Veronika Zhilina	(Russia) Sofia Muravieva	(Russia) Adeliia Petrosian	Details
JGP Russia	(Russia) Sofia Akateva	(Russia) Anastasia Zinina	(Russia) Sofia Samodelkina	Details
JGP Slovenia	(Russia) Adeliia Petrosian	(Russia) Sofia Samodelkina	(United States) Lindsay Thorngren	Details
JGP Poland	(Russia) Sofia Akateva	(Russia) Elizaveta Kulikova	(South Korea) Shin Ji-a	Details
JGP Austria	(Russia) Sofia Muravieva	(United States) Isabeau Levito	(Russia) Anastasia Zinina	Details
JGP Final	Competition cancelled			
Challenger Series
Competition	Gold	Silver	Bronze	Results
Lombardia Trophy	(United States) Alysa Liu	(Poland) Ekaterina Kurakova	(United States) Audrey Shin	Details
Autumn Classic	(Cyprus) Marilena Kitromilis	(South Korea) You Young	(South Korea) Ji Seo-yeon	Details
Nebelhorn Trophy	(United States) Alysa Liu	(Poland) Ekaterina Kurakova	(Belarus) Viktoriia Safonova	Details
Finlandia Trophy	(Russia) Kamila Valieva	(Russia) Elizaveta Tuktamysheva	(Russia) Alena Kostornaia	Details
Denis Ten Memorial	(Belarus) Viktoriia Safonova	(Azerbaijan) Ekaterina Ryabova	(Ukraine) Anastasiia Shabotova	Details
Cup of Austria	(Japan) Wakaba Higuchi	(South Korea) Park Yeon-jeong	(Estonia) Niina Petrõkina	Details
Warsaw Cup	(Russia) Maiia Khromykh	(Estonia) Niina Petrõkina	(Poland) Ekaterina Kurakova	Details
Golden Spin	(Georgia (country)) Anastasiia Gubanova	(United States) Amber Glenn	(Estonia) Niina Petrõkina	Details
Other international
Competition	Gold	Silver	Bronze	Results
Cranberry Cup	(United States) Alysa Liu	(South Korea) You Young	(United States) Mariah Bell	Details
U.S. Classic	(Russia) Alexandra Trusova	(South Korea) Park Yeon-jeong	(United States) Gabriella Izzo	Details
Asian Open Trophy	(Japan) Mai Mihara	(Japan) Kaori Sakamoto	(Hong Kong) Joanna So	Details
Ice Star	(Belarus) Viktoriia Safonova	(Russia) Anastasiia Guliakova	(Ukraine) Anastasiia Shabotova	Details
Budapest Trophy	(Russia) Maiia Khromykh	(Russia) Anna Shcherbakova	(Russia) Sofia Samodurova	Details
Viktor Petrenko Cup	(Latvia) Anete Lāce	No other competitors		Details
Trophée Métropole Nice	(France) Léa Serna	(Czech Republic) Eliška Březinová	(Romania) Julia Sauter	Details
Autumn Talents Cup	(Latvia) Angelīna Kučvaļska	(Ukraine) Anastasia Gozhva	(Ukraine) Anastasiia Arkhipova	Details
Tirnavia Ice Cup	(United Kingdom) Kristen Spours	(Slovakia) Alexandra Michaela Filcová	(Austria) Stefanie Pesendorfer	Details
Volvo Open Cup	(Georgia (country)) Alina Urushadze	(Switzerland) Livia Kaiser	(Finland) Oona Ounasvuori	Details
NRW Trophy	(Netherlands) Lindsay van Zundert	(France) Léa Serna	(Sweden) Josefin Taljegård	Details
Tayside Trophy	(United Kingdom) Natasha McKay	(Bulgaria) Alexandra Feigin	(Czech Republic) Eliška Březinová	Details
Tallinn Trophy	(Sweden) Josefin Taljegård	(Latvia) Angelīna Kučvaļska	(Finland) Olivia Lisko	Details
Skate Celje	(Austria) Sophia Schaller	(Slovenia) Daša Grm	(Austria) Stefanie Pesendorfer	Details
Open d'Andorra	(Finland) Emmi Peltonen	(Norway) Linnea Kilsand	(Norway) Frida Turiddotter Berge	Details
Santa Claus Cup	(Azerbaijan) Ekaterina Ryabova	(Hungary) Regina Schermann	(Hungary) Júlia Láng	Details
IceLab International Cup	(Italy) Lucrezia Beccari	(Austria) Sophia Schaller	(Latvia) Angelīna Kučvaļska	Details
Bavarian Open	(Germany) Kristina Isaev	(Germany) Nicole Schott	(Finland) Linnea Ceder	Details
Skate Helena	(Slovenia) Daša Grm	(Hungary) Júlia Láng	(Romania) Julia Sauter	Details
Nordic Open	(Finland) Oona Ounasvuori	(Chinese Taipei) Ting Tzu-Han	(Finland) Olivia Lisko	Details
Sofia Trophy	(Austria) Stefanie Pesendorfer	(Bulgaria) Alexandra Feigin	(Latvia) Angelīna Kučvaļska	Details
Reykjavik Int. Games	(Finland) Petra Palmio	(Iceland) Aldís Kara Bergsdóttir	(Norway) Frida Turiddotter Berge	Details
Merano Ice Trophy	(Italy) Ginevra Lavinia Negrello	(Italy) Lucrezia Beccari	(Austria) Sophia Schaller	Details
Winter Star	(Russia) Stanislava Molchanova	(Belarus) Milana Ramashova	(Belarus) Aliaksandra Chepeleva	Details
Dragon Trophy	(Slovenia) Daša Grm	(Switzerland) Yasmine Kimiko Yamada	(Romania) Julia Sauter	Details
Jégvirág Cup	(Hungary) Júlia Láng	(Finland) Olivia Lisko	(Czech Republic) Nikola Rychtaříková	Details
Bellu Memorial	(Romania) Ana Sofia Beşchea	(Slovakia) Ema Doboszová	(Israel) Taylor Morris	Details
Challenge Cup	(Japan) Rino Matsuike	(United States) Lindsay Thorngren	(Hungary) Júlia Láng	Details
Tallink Hotels Cup	(Estonia) Kristina Škuleta-Gromova	(Italy) Lara Naki Gutmann	(France) Lorine Schild	Details
Coupe du Printemps	(Japan) Rinka Watanabe	(Japan) Rion Sumiyoshi	(New Zealand) Jocelyn Hong	Details
EYOF	(France) Lorine Schild	(Finland) Olivia Lisko	(Switzerland) Sarina Joos	Details
Egna Spring Trophy	(Japan) Hana Yoshida	(South Korea) Lee Hae-in	(Japan) Mone Chiba	Details
Triglav Trophy	(South Korea) Lee Hae-in	(United Kingdom) Kristen Spours	(Italy) Ester Schwarz	Details

=== Pairs ===
Olympic Games
Competition	Gold	Silver	Bronze	Results
Winter Olympics	(China) Sui Wenjing / Han Cong	(Russia) Evgenia Tarasova / Vladimir Morozov	(Russia) Anastasia Mishina / Aleksandr Galliamov	Details
Championships
Competition	Gold	Silver	Bronze	Results
Europeans	(Russia) Anastasia Mishina / Aleksandr Galliamov	(Russia) Evgenia Tarasova / Vladimir Morozov	(Russia) Aleksandra Boikova / Dmitrii Kozlovskii	Details
Four Continents	(United States) Audrey Lu / Misha Mitrofanov	(United States) Emily Chan / Spencer Akira Howe	(Canada) Evelyn Walsh / Trennt Michaud	Details
Worlds	(United States) Alexa Knierim / Brandon Frazier	(Japan) Riku Miura / Ryuichi Kihara	(Canada) Vanessa James / Eric Radford	Details
Junior Worlds	(Georgia (country)) Karina Safina / Luka Berulava	(Australia) Anastasia Golubeva / Hektor Giotopoulos Moore	(Canada) Brooke McIntosh / Benjamin Mimar	Details
Grand Prix
Competition	Gold	Silver	Bronze	Results
Skate America	(Russia) Evgenia Tarasova / Vladimir Morozov	(Japan) Riku Miura / Ryuichi Kihara	(Russia) Aleksandra Boikova / Dmitrii Kozlovskii	Details
Skate Canada	(China) Sui Wenjing / Han Cong	(Russia) Daria Pavliuchenko / Denis Khodykin	(United States) Ashley Cain-Gribble / Timothy LeDuc	Details
Gran Premio d'Italia	(China) Sui Wenjing / Han Cong	(China) Peng Cheng / Jin Yang	(Russia) Iuliia Artemeva / Mikhail Nazarychev	Details
NHK Trophy	(Russia) Anastasia Mishina / Aleksandr Galliamov	(Russia) Evgenia Tarasova / Vladimir Morozov	(Japan) Riku Miura / Ryuichi Kihara	Details
Internationaux de France	(Russia) Aleksandra Boikova / Dmitrii Kozlovskii	(Russia) Iuliia Artemeva / Mikhail Nazarychev	(United States) Alexa Knierim / Brandon Frazier	Details
Rostelecom Cup	(Russia) Anastasia Mishina / Aleksandr Galliamov	(Russia) Daria Pavliuchenko / Denis Khodykin	(Russia) Yasmina Kadyrova / Ivan Balchenko	Details
Grand Prix Final	Competition cancelled			
Junior Grand Prix
Competition	Gold	Silver	Bronze	Results
JGP Slovakia	(Russia) Anastasia Mukhortova / Dmitry Evgenyev	(Georgia (country)) Karina Safina / Luka Berulava	(Russia) Polina Kostiukovich / Aleksei Briukhanov	Details
JGP Russia	(Russia) Ekaterina Chikmareva / Matvei Ianchenkov	(Russia) Natalia Khabibullina / Ilya Knyazhuk	(Russia) Ekaterina Petushkova / Evgenii Malikov	Details
JGP Poland	(Russia) Ekaterina Chikmareva / Matvei Ianchenkov	(Russia) Ekaterina Petushkova / Evgenii Malikov	(Russia) Polina Kostiukovich / Aleksei Briukhanov	Details
JGP Austria	(Russia) Natalia Khabibullina / Ilya Knyazhuk	(Russia) Anastasia Mukhortova / Dmitry Evgenyev	(Georgia (country)) Karina Safina / Luka Berulava	Details
JGP Final	Competition cancelled			
Challenger Series
Competition	Gold	Silver	Bronze	Results
Autumn Classic	(Japan) Riku Miura / Ryuichi Kihara	(Canada) Vanessa James / Eric Radford	(United States) Ashley Cain-Gribble / Timothy LeDuc	Details
Nebelhorn Trophy	(Germany) Minerva Fabienne Hase / Nolan Seegert	(Spain) Laura Barquero / Marco Zandron	(Georgia (country)) Karina Safina / Luka Berulava	Details
Finlandia Trophy	(Russia) Anastasia Mishina / Aleksandr Galliamov	(Russia) Evgenia Tarasova / Vladimir Morozov	(United States) Ashley Cain-Gribble / Timothy LeDuc	Details
Warsaw Cup	(Russia) Evgenia Tarasova / Vladimir Morozov	(United States) Jessica Calalang / Brian Johnson	(Russia) Yasmina Kadyrova / Ivan Balchenko	Details
Golden Spin	(United States) Audrey Lu / Misha Mitrofanov	(Georgia (country)) Anastasiia Metelkina / Daniil Parkman	(Russia) Iuliia Artemeva / Mikhail Nazarychev	Details
Other international
Competition	Gold	Silver	Bronze	Results
Cranberry Cup	(Russia) Evgenia Tarasova / Vladimir Morozov	(United States) Alexa Knierim / Brandon Frazier	(United States) Jessica Calalang / Brian Johnson	Details
John Nicks Challenge	(United States) Alexa Knierim / Brandon Frazier	(United States) Jessica Calalang / Brian Johnson	(United States) Audrey Lu / Misha Mitrofanov	Details
Lombardia Trophy	(Italy) Nicole Della Monica / Matteo Guarise	(Spain) Laura Barquero / Marco Zandron	(Italy) Rebecca Ghilardi / Filippo Ambrosini	Details
Asian Open Trophy	(China) Sui Wenjing / Han Cong	(China) Peng Cheng / Jin Yang	(China) Wang Yuchen / Huang Yihang	Details
Ice Star	(Belarus) Ekaterina Yurova / Dmitry Bushlanov	(Belarus) Bogdana Lukashevich / Alexander Stepanov	No other competitors	Details
Budapest Trophy	(Russia) Karina Akopova / Nikita Rakhmanin	(Georgia (country)) Anastasiia Metelkina / Daniil Parkman	(Hungary) Ioulia Chtchetinina / Márk Magyar	Details
Trophée Métropole Nice	(Spain) Laura Barquero / Marco Zandron	(Italy) Sara Conti / Niccolò Macii	(Spain) Dorota Broda / Pedro Betegón Martín	Details
Autumn Talents Cup	(Czech Republic) Elizaveta Zhuk / Martin Bidař	No other competitors		Details
Denis Ten Memorial	(Russia) Karina Akopova / Nikita Rakhmanin	(Russia) Anastasia Mukhortova / Dmitry Evgenyev	(Russia) Yasmina Kadyrova / Ivan Balchenko	Details
NRW Trophy	(Netherlands) Daria Danilova / Michel Tsiba	(Netherlands) Nika Osipova / Dmitry Epstein	No other competitors	Details
Tayside Trophy	(United Kingdom) Anastasia Vaipan-Law / Luke Digby	(Spain) Dorota Broda / Pedro Betegón Martín	(Italy) Anna Valesi / Manuel Piazza	Details
Ice Challenge	(Australia) Campbell Young / Lachlan Lewer	No other competitors		Details
IceLab International Cup	(Spain) Dorota Broda / Pedro Betegón Martín	(Italy) Anna Valesi / Manuel Piazza	(Italy) Irma Caldara / Riccardo Maglio	Details
Bavarian Open	(Italy) Irma Caldara / Riccardo Maglio	(Italy) Anna Valesi / Manuel Piazza	(Netherlands) Nika Osipova / Dmitry Epstein	Details
Winter Star	(Belarus) Bogdana Lukashevich / Alexander Stepanov	(Belarus) Ekaterina Yurova / Dmitry Bushlanov	No other competitors	Details
Challenge Cup	(Russia) Karina Akopova / Nikita Rakhmanin	(Netherlands) Daria Danilova / Michel Tsiba	(Netherlands) Nika Osipova / Dmitry Epstein	Details

=== Ice dance ===
Olympic Games
Competition	Gold	Silver	Bronze	Results
Winter Olympics	(France) Gabriella Papadakis / Guillaume Cizeron	(Russia) Victoria Sinitsina / Nikita Katsalapov	(United States) Madison Hubbell / Zachary Donohue	Details
Championships
Competition	Gold	Silver	Bronze	Results
Europeans	(Russia) Victoria Sinitsina / Nikita Katsalapov	(Russia) Alexandra Stepanova / Ivan Bukin	(Italy) Charlène Guignard / Marco Fabbri	Details
Four Continents	(United States) Caroline Green / Michael Parsons	(Japan) Kana Muramoto / Daisuke Takahashi	(United States) Christina Carreira / Anthony Ponomarenko	Details
Worlds	(France) Gabriella Papadakis / Guillaume Cizeron	(United States) Madison Hubbell / Zachary Donohue	(United States) Madison Chock / Evan Bates	Details
Junior Worlds	(United States) Oona Brown / Gage Brown	(Canada) Natalie D'Alessandro / Bruce Waddell	(Canada) Nadiia Bashynska / Peter Beaumont	Details
Grand Prix
Competition	Gold	Silver	Bronze	Results
Skate America	(United States) Madison Hubbell / Zachary Donohue	(United States) Madison Chock / Evan Bates	(Canada) Laurence Fournier Beaudry / Nikolaj Sørensen	Details
Skate Canada	(Canada) Piper Gilles / Paul Poirier	(Italy) Charlène Guignard / Marco Fabbri	(Spain) Olivia Smart / Adrián Díaz	Details
Gran Premio d'Italia	(France) Gabriella Papadakis / Guillaume Cizeron	(United States) Madison Hubbell / Zachary Donohue	(Russia) Alexandra Stepanova / Ivan Bukin	Details
NHK Trophy	(Russia) Victoria Sinitsina / Nikita Katsalapov	(United States) Madison Chock / Evan Bates	(United Kingdom) Lilah Fear / Lewis Gibson	Details
Internationaux de France	(France) Gabriella Papadakis / Guillaume Cizeron	(Canada) Piper Gilles / Paul Poirier	(Russia) Alexandra Stepanova / Ivan Bukin	Details
Rostelecom Cup	(Russia) Victoria Sinitsina / Nikita Katsalapov	(Italy) Charlène Guignard / Marco Fabbri	(Canada) Laurence Fournier Beaudry / Nikolaj Sørensen	Details
Grand Prix Final	Competition cancelled			
Junior Grand Prix
Competition	Gold	Silver	Bronze	Results
JGP France I	(United States) Katarina Wolfkostin / Jeffrey Chen	(Canada) Miku Makita / Tyler Gunara	(South Korea) Hannah Lim / Ye Quan	Details
JGP France II	(United States) Oona Brown / Gage Brown	(United States) Isabella Flores / Dimitry Tsarevski	(Estonia) Solène Mazingue / Marko Jevgeni Gaidajenko	Details
JGP Slovakia	(Canada) Natalie D'Alessandro / Bruce Waddell	(Russia) Vasilisa Kaganovskaia / Valeriy Angelopol	(Russia) Sofya Tyutyunina / Alexander Shustitskiy	Details
JGP Russia	(Russia) Irina Khavronina / Dario Cirisano	(Russia) Sofia Leonteva / Daniil Gorelkin	(United States) Angela Ling / Caleb Wein	Details
JGP Slovenia	(Russia) Vasilisa Kaganovskaia / Valeriy Angelopol	(United States) Katarina Wolfkostin / Jeffrey Chen	(Canada) Natalie D'Alessandro / Bruce Waddell	Details
JGP Poland	(Russia) Irina Khavronina / Dario Cirisano	(United States) Isabella Flores / Dimitry Tsarevski	(Cyprus) Angelina Kudryavtseva / Ilia Karankevich	Details
JGP Austria	(Russia) Sofya Tyutyunina / Alexander Shustitskiy	(United States) Oona Brown / Gage Brown	(Canada) Nadiia Bashynska / Peter Beaumont	Details
JGP Final	Competition cancelled			
Challenger Series
Competition	Gold	Silver	Bronze	Results
Lombardia Trophy	(Italy) Charlène Guignard / Marco Fabbri	(Canada) Laurence Fournier Beaudry / Nikolaj Sørensen	(Spain) Sara Hurtado / Kirill Khaliavin	Details
Autumn Classic	(Canada) Piper Gilles / Paul Poirier	(Spain) Olivia Smart / Adrián Díaz	(United States) Caroline Green / Michael Parsons	Details
Nebelhorn Trophy	(Finland) Juulia Turkkila / Matthias Versluis	(Germany) Katharina Müller / Tim Dieck	(Georgia (country)) Maria Kazakova / Georgy Reviya	Details
Finlandia Trophy	(France) Gabriella Papadakis / Guillaume Cizeron	(United States) Madison Chock / Evan Bates	(United Kingdom) Lilah Fear / Lewis Gibson	Details
Denis Ten Memorial	(Russia) Anastasia Skoptsova / Kirill Aleshin	(Ukraine) Oleksandra Nazarova / Maksym Nikitin	(Russia) Elizaveta Khudaiberdieva / Egor Bazin	Details
Cup of Austria	(Italy) Charlène Guignard / Marco Fabbri	(Canada) Laurence Fournier Beaudry / Nikolaj Sørensen	(Spain) Olivia Smart / Adrián Díaz	Details
Warsaw Cup	(Russia) Diana Davis / Gleb Smolkin	(Japan) Kana Muramoto / Daisuke Takahashi	(United States) Caroline Green / Michael Parsons	Details
Golden Spin	(United States) Kaitlin Hawayek / Jean-Luc Baker	(Lithuania) Allison Reed / Saulius Ambrulevičius	(Russia) Elizaveta Shanaeva / Devid Naryzhnyy	Details
Other international
Competition	Gold	Silver	Bronze	Results
Lake Placid International	(United States) Caroline Green / Michael Parsons	(Armenia) Tina Garabedian / Simon Proulx-Sénécal	(United States) Molly Cesanek / Yehor Yehorov	Details
U.S. Classic	(United States) Madison Hubbell / Zachary Donohue	(Russia) Diana Davis / Gleb Smolkin	(United States) Eva Pate / Logan Bye	Details
Asian Open Trophy	(China) Wang Shiyue / Liu Xinyu	(China) Chen Hong / Sun Zhuoming	No other competitors	Details
Budapest Trophy	(Armenia) Tina Garabedian / Simon Proulx-Sénécal	(Lithuania) Allison Reed / Saulius Ambrulevičius	(Russia) Elizaveta Shanaeva / Devid Naryzhnyy	Details
Ice Star	(Belarus) Viktoria Semenjuk / Ilya Yukhimuk	(Russia) Ekaterina Mironova / Evgenii Ustenko	(Estonia) Aleksandra Samersova / Kevin Ojala	Details
Mezzaluna Cup	(Georgia (country)) Maria Kazakova / Georgy Reviya	(Australia) Chantelle Kerry / Andrew Dodds	(Italy) Carolina Moscheni / Francesco Fioretti	Details
Viktor Petrenko Cup	(Ukraine) Oleksandra Nazarova / Maksym Nikitin	(United Kingdom) Sasha Fear / George Waddell	(Poland) Anastasia Polibina / Pavel Golovishnikov	Details
Trophée Métropole Nice	(Finland) Juulia Turkkila / Matthias Versluis	(France) Evgeniia Lopareva / Geoffrey Brissaud	(France) Loïcia Demougeot / Théo Le Mercier	Details
Volvo Open Cup	(Russia) Elizaveta Khudaiberdieva / Egor Bazin	(Hungary) Mariia Ignateva / Danijil Szemko	(Azerbaijan) Ekaterina Kuznetsova / Oleksandr Kolosovskyi	Details
NRW Trophy	(Finland) Yuka Orihara / Juho Pirinen	(France) Natacha Lagouge / Arnaud Caffa	(Switzerland) Jasmine Tessari / Stéphane Walker	Details
Pavel Roman Memorial	(Czech Republic) Natálie Taschlerová / Filip Taschler	(Russia) Ekaterina Mironova / Evgenii Ustenko	(Ukraine) Mariia Holubtsova / Kyryl Bielobrov	Details
Open d'Andorra	(United Kingdom) Lilah Fear / Lewis Gibson	(Germany) Katharina Müller / Tim Dieck	(France) Loïcia Demougeot / Théo Le Mercier	Details
Santa Claus Cup	(Russia) Anastasia Skoptsova / Kirill Aleshin	(Hungary) Mariia Ignateva / Danijil Szemko	(Australia) Holly Harris / Jason Chan	Details
Bavarian Open	(Germany) Jennifer Janse van Rensburg / Benjamin Steffan	(France) Marie Dupayage / Thomas Nabais	(France) Lou Terreaux / Noé Perron	Details
Egna Dance Trophy	(Germany) Jennifer Janse van Rensburg / Benjamin Steffan	(Italy) Carolina Moscheni / Francesco Fioretti	(Israel) Mariia Nosovitskaya / Mikhail Nosovitsky	Details
Winter Star	(Estonia) Aleksandra Samersova / Kevin Ojala	(Kazakhstan) Gaukhar Nauryzova / Boyisangur Datiev	(Bosnia and Herzegovina) Ekaterina Mitrofanova / Vladislav Kasinskij	Details
Jégvirág Cup	(Hungary) Mariia Ignateva / Danijil Szemko	(Kazakhstan) Gaukhar Nauryzova / Boyisangur Datiev	(United Kingdom) Charlotte Man / Toby Palmer	Details
Challenge Cup	(France) Natacha Lagouge / Arnaud Caffa	(Finland) Yuka Orihara / Juho Pirinen	(Hungary) Mariia Ignateva / Danijil Szemko	Details

== Records and achievements ==
=== Records ===
==== Senior ====
The following new senior ISU best scores were set during this season:

Discipline	Component	Skater(s)	Score	Event	Date	Ref
Women	Free skating	(Russia) Kamila Valieva	174.31	2021 Finlandia Trophy	October 10, 2021	
Women	Total score	(Russia) Kamila Valieva	249.24	2021 Finlandia Trophy	October 10, 2021	
Women	Free skating	(Russia) Kamila Valieva	180.89	2021 Skate Canada	October 30, 2021	
Women	Total score	(Russia) Kamila Valieva	265.08	2021 Skate Canada	October 30, 2021	
Women	Short program	(Russia) Kamila Valieva	87.42	2021 Rostelecom Cup	November 26, 2021	
Women	Free skating	(Russia) Kamila Valieva	185.29	2021 Rostelecom Cup	November 27, 2021	
Women	Total score	(Russia) Kamila Valieva	272.71	2021 Rostelecom Cup	November 27, 2021	
Pairs	Short program	(Russia) Anastasia Mishina / Aleksandr Galliamov	82.36	2022 Europeans	January 12, 2022	
Women	Short program	(Russia) Kamila Valieva	90.45	2022 Europeans	January 13, 2022	
Pairs	Total score	(Russia) Evgenia Tarasova / Vladimir Morozov	236.43	2022 Europeans	January 13, 2022	
Pairs	Free skating	(Russia) Anastasia Mishina / Aleksandr Galliamov	157.46	2022 Europeans	January 13, 2022	
Pairs	Total score	(Russia) Anastasia Mishina / Aleksandr Galliamov	239.82	2022 Europeans	January 13, 2022	
Pairs	Short program	(China) Sui Wenjing / Han Cong	82.83	2022 Winter Olympics (team)	February 4, 2022	
Men	Short program	(United States) Nathan Chen	113.97	2022 Winter Olympics	February 8, 2022	
Ice dance	Rhythm dance	(France) Gabriella Papadakis / Guillaume Cizeron	90.83	2022 Winter Olympics	February 12, 2022	
Ice dance	Total score	(France) Gabriella Papadakis / Guillaume Cizeron	226.98	2022 Winter Olympics	February 14, 2022	
Pairs	Short program	(China) Sui Wenjing / Han Cong	84.41	2022 Winter Olympics	February 18, 2022	
Pairs	Total score	(China) Sui Wenjing / Han Cong	239.88	2022 Winter Olympics	February 19, 2022	
Ice dance	Rhythm dance	(France) Gabriella Papadakis / Guillaume Cizeron	92.73	2022 Worlds	March 25, 2022	
Ice dance	Free dance	(France) Gabriella Papadakis / Guillaume Cizeron	137.09	2022 Worlds	March 26, 2022	
Ice dance	Total score	(France) Gabriella Papadakis / Guillaume Cizeron	229.82	2022 Worlds	March 26, 2022	

==== Junior ====
The following new junior ISU best scores were set during this season:

Discipline	Component	Skater(s)	Score	Event	Date	Ref
Women	Free skating	(Russia) Sofia Akateva	157.19	2021 JGP Russia	September 18, 2021	
Women	Total score	(Russia) Sofia Akateva	233.08	2021 JGP Russia	September 18, 2021	
Men	Short program	(United States) Ilia Malinin	88.99	2022 Junior Worlds	April 14, 2022	
Men	Free skating	(United States) Ilia Malinin	187.12	2022 Junior Worlds	April 16, 2022	
Men	Total score	(United States) Ilia Malinin	276.11	2022 Junior Worlds	April 16, 2022	

=== Achievements ===
Olympic Games

ISU Championships

- Deniss Vasiļjevs (bronze at 2022 Europeans) won Latvia's first ISU Championships medal.
- At 2022 Europeans, (Russia) Kamila Valieva recorded the highest-ever PCS and TES in the short program to break her own ISU record for the short program score. (Russia) Anastasia Mishina / Aleksandr Galliamov recorded the highest-ever PCS in the short program and TES in the free skating en route to breaking all three ISU records, including the free skating record set earlier in the event by (Russia) Evgenia Tarasova / Vladimir Morozov.
- (Japan) Kana Muramoto / Daisuke Takahashi (silver at 2022 Four Continents) earned the highest placement for a Japanese ice dance team at an ISU Championships event. Takahashi is the first skater to earn a medal in two different disciplines at the Four Continents Championships, having previously won four medals in men's singles, including two golds.
- (South Korea) Cha Jun-hwan (gold at 2022 Four Continents) is the first Korean men's singles skater to win an ISU Championships event.
- (Japan) Riku Miura / Ryuichi Kihara (silver at 2022 Worlds) earned the highest placement for a Japanese pair at the World Championships.
- (Belgium) Loena Hendrickx (silver at 2022 Worlds) is the first Belgian women's singles skater to win a medal at an ISU Championships event.
- At 2022 Worlds, (France) Gabriella Papadakis / Guillaume Cizeron recorded the highest-ever PCS and TES in the rhythm dance to break their own ISU record for the rhythm dance score. Papadakis / Cizeron also recorded highest-ever PCS in the free dance, and broke their own ISU records for the free dance and combined scores.
- At 2022 Junior Worlds, (United States) Ilia Malinin recorded the highest-ever PCS for a junior man in the short program, and set the junior record for the short program score. Malinin also recorded both highest-ever TES and PCS for a junior man in the free skating, and broke the junior records for the free skating and combined scores.
- (Georgia (country)) Karina Safina / Luka Berulava (gold at 2022 Junior Worlds) won Georgia's first ISU Championships title in any discipline. They also recorded the highest-ever PCS for a junior pairs in the short program.
- Mikhail Shaidorov (silver at 2022 Junior Worlds) won Kazakhstan's first World Junior Championships medal.

ISU Grand Prix and Junior Grand Prix

ISU Challenger Series and senior Bs

- Marilena Kitromilis (gold at 2021 CS Autumn Classic International) won Cyprus' first title at an ISU-sanctioned event.
- At 2021 CS Finlandia Trophy, (Russia) Kamila Valieva recorded the highest-ever TES for a woman in the free skating and broke ISU records for the free skating and combined scores.
- In the women's free skating at 2021 Budapest Trophy, (Russia) Maiia Khromykh became the 12th women to land a fully rotated quadruple jump in international competition.
- In the junior women's short program at 2021 Denis Ten Memorial Challenge, (Russia) Sofia Samodelkina became the 15th woman to successfully land a triple Axel in international competition.
- In the junior women's free skating at 2022 Bavarian Open, (Japan) Hana Yoshida became the 19th woman to successfully land a triple Axel in international competition.
- In the junior women's free skating at 2022 Coupe du Printemps, (Japan) Ami Nakai became the 20th woman to successfully land a triple Axel in international competition.

== Season's best scores ==
=== Men ===
==== Best total score ====
Rank	Skater	Nation	Score	Event
1	Nathan Chen	United States	332.60	2022 Winter Olympics
2	Shoma Uno	Japan	312.48	2022 Worlds
3	Yuma Kagiyama	Japan	310.05	2022 Winter Olympics
4	Vincent Zhou	United States	295.56	2021 Skate America
5	Mark Kondratiuk	Russia	286.56	2022 Europeans
6	Yuzuru Hanyu	Japan	283.21	2022 Winter Olympics
7	Cha Jun-hwan	South Korea	282.38	2022 Winter Olympics
8	Jason Brown	United States	281.24	2022 Winter Olympics
9	Daniel Grassl	Italy	278.07	2022 Winter Olympics
10	Ilia Malinin	United States	276.11	2022 Junior Worlds
11	Evgeni Semenenko	Russia	274.13	2022 Winter Olympics
12	Mikhail Kolyada	Russia	273.55	2021 Gran Premio d'Italia
13	Deniss Vasiļjevs	Latvia	272.08	2022 Europeans
14	Morisi Kvitelashvili	Georgia	272.03	2022 Worlds
15	Camden Pulkinen	United States	271.69	2022 Worlds
16	Jin Boyang	China	270.43	2022 Winter Olympics
17	Kazuki Tomono	Japan	269.37	2022 Worlds
18	Adam Siao Him Fa	France	266.12	2022 Worlds
19	Andrei Mozalev	Russia	265.69	2022 Europeans
20	Keegan Messing	Canada	265.61	2022 Winter Olympics

==== Best short program score ====
Rank	Skater	Nation	Score	Event
1	Nathan Chen	United States	113.97	2022 Winter Olympics
2	Shoma Uno	Japan	109.63	2022 Worlds
3	Yuma Kagiyama	Japan	108.12	2022 Winter Olympics
4	Kazuki Tomono	Japan	101.12	2022 Worlds
5	Ilia Malinin	United States	100.16	2022 Worlds
6	Andrei Mozalev	Russia	99.76	2022 Europeans
7	Cha Jun-hwan	South Korea	99.51	2022 Winter Olympics
7	Vincent Zhou	United States	99.51	2021 NHK Trophy
9	Mark Kondratiuk	Russia	99.06	2022 Europeans
10	Evgeni Semenenko	Russia	99.04	2022 Europeans
11	Morisi Kvitelashvili	Georgia	97.98	2022 Winter Olympics
12	Jin Boyang	China	97.89	2021 Gran Premio d'Italia
13	Daniel Grassl	Italy	97.62	2022 Worlds
14	Jason Brown	United States	97.24	2022 Winter Olympics
15	Yuzuru Hanyu	Japan	95.15	2022 Winter Olympics
16	Keegan Messing	Canada	93.28	2021 Skate Canada
17	Kévin Aymoz	France	93.00	2022 Winter Olympics
18	Mikhail Kolyada	Russia	92.30	2021 Gran Premio d'Italia
19	Petr Gumennik	Russia	91.84	2021 Denis Ten Memorial
20	Sōta Yamamoto	Japan	91.75	2021 Warsaw Cup

==== Best free skating score ====
Rank	Skater	Nation	Score	Event
1	Nathan Chen	United States	218.63	2022 Winter Olympics
2	Yuma Kagiyama	Japan	208.94	2022 Winter Olympics (team)
3	Shoma Uno	Japan	202.85	2022 Worlds
4	Vincent Zhou	United States	198.13	2021 Skate America
5	Yuzuru Hanyu	Japan	188.06	2022 Winter Olympics
6	Mark Kondratiuk	Russia	187.50	2022 Europeans
7	Daniel Grassl	Italy	187.43	2022 Winter Olympics
8	Ilia Malinin	United States	187.12	2022 Junior Worlds
9	Jason Brown	United States	184.00	2022 Winter Olympics
10	Cha Jun-hwan	South Korea	182.87	2022 Winter Olympics
11	Camden Pulkinen	United States	182.19	2022 Worlds
12	Deniss Vasiļjevs	Latvia	181.84	2022 Europeans
13	Mikhail Kolyada	Russia	181.25	2021 Gran Premio d'Italia
14	Andrei Mozalev	Russia	179.77	2021 Internationaux de France
15	Jin Boyang	China	179.45	2022 Winter Olympics
16	Morisi Kvitelashvili	Georgia	179.42	2022 Worlds
17	Evgeni Semenenko	Russia	178.37	2022 Winter Olympics
18	Shun Sato	Japan	177.17	2021 Internationaux de France
19	Matteo Rizzo	Italy	176.18	2021 Finlandia Trophy
20	Adam Siao Him Fa	France	175.15	2022 Worlds

=== Women ===
==== Best total score ====
Rank	Skater	Nation	Score	Event
1	Kamila Valieva	Russia	272.71	2021 Rostelecom Cup
2	Anna Shcherbakova	Russia	255.95	2022 Winter Olympics
3	Alexandra Trusova	Russia	251.73	2022 Winter Olympics
4	Kaori Sakamoto	Japan	236.09	2022 Worlds
5	Elizaveta Tuktamysheva	Russia	233.30	2021 Finlandia Trophy
6	Sofia Akateva	Russia	233.08	2021 JGP Russia
7	Maiia Khromykh	Russia	226.35	2021 Gran Premio d'Italia
8	Alena Kostornaia	Russia	221.85	2021 Internationaux de France
9	Alysa Liu	United States	219.24	2021 Lombardia Trophy
10	Loena Hendrickx	Belgium	219.05	2021 Gran Premio d'Italia
11	Mai Mihara	Japan	218.03	2022 Four Continents
12	Daria Usacheva	Russia	217.31	2021 Skate America
13	You Young	South Korea	216.97	2021 Skate America
14	Veronika Zhilina	Russia	216.92	2021 JGP Slovakia
15	Wakaba Higuchi	Japan	214.44	2022 Winter Olympics
16	Lee Hae-in	South Korea	213.52	2022 Four Continents
17	Sofia Muravieva	Russia	211.81	2021 JGP Austria
18	Adeliia Petrosian	Russia	210.57	2021 JGP Slovenia
19	Mariah Bell	United States	210.35	2021 Rostelecom Cup
20	Kim Ye-lim	South Korea	209.91	2022 Four Continents

==== Best short program score ====
Rank	Skater	Nation	Score	Event
1	Kamila Valieva	Russia	90.45	2022 Europeans
2	Elizaveta Tuktamysheva	Russia	81.53	2021 Finlandia Trophy
3	Kaori Sakamoto	Japan	80.32	2022 Worlds
4	Anna Shcherbakova	Russia	80.20	2022 Winter Olympics
5	Wakaba Higuchi	Japan	79.73	2021 Cup of Austria
6	Alena Kostornaia	Russia	78.61	2021 Finlandia Trophy
7	Alexandra Trusova	Russia	77.69	2021 Skate America
8	Daria Usacheva	Russia	76.71	2021 Skate America
9	Loena Hendrickx	Belgium	76.25	2022 Europeans
10	Sofia Akateva	Russia	75.89	2021 JGP Russia
11	Alysa Liu	United States	74.31	2021 Lombardia Trophy
12	Mana Kawabe	Japan	73.88	2021 NHK Trophy
13	Sofia Muravieva	Russia	73.28	2021 JGP Austria
14	Mai Mihara	Japan	72.62	2022 Four Continents
15	Mariah Bell	United States	72.55	2022 Worlds
16	Isabeau Levito	United States	72.50	2022 Junior Worlds
17	You Young	South Korea	72.08	2022 Worlds
18	Maiia Khromykh	Russia	72.04	2021 Gran Premio d'Italia
19	Veronika Zhilina	Russia	71.57	2021 JGP Slovakia
20	Kseniia Sinitsyna	Russia	71.51	2021 Skate America

==== Best free skating score ====
Rank	Skater	Nation	Score	Event
1	Kamila Valieva	Russia	185.29	2021 Rostelecom Cup
2	Alexandra Trusova	Russia	177.13	2022 Winter Olympics
3	Anna Shcherbakova	Russia	175.75	2022 Winter Olympics
4	Sofia Akateva	Russia	157.19	2021 JGP Russia
5	Kaori Sakamoto	Japan	155.77	2022 Worlds
6	Maiia Khromykh	Russia	154.97	2021 Rostelecom Cup
7	Elizaveta Tuktamysheva	Russia	151.77	2021 Finlandia Trophy
8	You Young	South Korea	146.24	2021 Skate America
9	Loena Hendrickx	Belgium	145.53	2021 Gran Premio d'Italia
10	Alena Kostornaia	Russia	145.41	2021 Internationaux de France
10	Mai Mihara	Japan	145.41	2022 Four Continents
12	Veronika Zhilina	Russia	145.35	2021 JGP Slovakia
13	Alysa Liu	United States	144.93	2021 Lombardia Trophy
14	Lee Hae-in	South Korea	143.55	2022 Four Continents
15	Rino Matsuike	Japan	142.05	2022 Four Continents
16	Sofia Samodelkina	Russia	141.63	2021 JGP Russia
17	Wakaba Higuchi	Japan	141.04	2021 Internationaux de France
18	Mariah Bell	United States	140.98	2021 Rostelecom Cup
18	Kim Ye-lim	South Korea	140.98	2022 Four Continents
20	Daria Usacheva	Russia	140.60	2021 Skate America

=== Pairs ===
==== Best total score ====
Rank	Skaters	Nation	Score	Event
1	Sui Wenjing / Han Cong	China	239.88	2022 Winter Olympics
2	Anastasia Mishina / Aleksandr Galliamov	Russia	239.82	2022 Europeans
3	Evgenia Tarasova / Vladimir Morozov	Russia	239.25	2022 Winter Olympics
4	Aleksandra Boikova / Dmitrii Kozlovskii	Russia	227.23	2022 Europeans
5	Alexa Knierim / Brandon Frazier	United States	221.09	2022 Worlds
6	Peng Cheng / Jin Yang	China	214.84	2022 Winter Olympics
7	Daria Pavliuchenko / Denis Khodykin	Russia	212.59	2021 Rostelecom Cup
8	Riku Miura / Ryuichi Kihara	Japan	211.89	2022 Winter Olympics
9	Iuliia Artemeva / Mikhail Nazarychev	Russia	205.15	2021 Internationaux de France
10	Ashley Cain-Gribble / Timothy LeDuc	United States	202.79	2021 NHK Trophy
11	Jessica Calalang / Brian Johnson	United States	197.42	2021 Skate America
12	Vanessa James / Eric Radford	Canada	197.32	2022 Worlds
13	Audrey Lu / Misha Mitrofanov	United States	195.32	2021 Golden Spin of Zagreb
14	Yasmina Kadyrova / Ivan Balchenko	Russia	193.58	2021 Rostelecom Cup
15	Karina Safina / Luka Berulava	Georgia	192.44	2022 Winter Olympics
16	Alina Pepeleva / Roman Pleshkov	Russia	190.93	2021 Warsaw Cup
17	Laura Barquero / Marco Zandron	Spain	189.99	2021 Finlandia Trophy
18	Minerva Fabienne Hase / Nolan Seegert	Germany	189.61	2022 Worlds
19	Anastasiia Metelkina / Daniil Parkman	Georgia	189.60	2021 Golden Spin of Zagreb
20	Ekaterina Chikmareva / Matvei Ianchenkov	Russia	189.11	2021 JGP Russia

==== Best short program score ====
Rank	Skaters	Nation	Score	Event
1	Sui Wenjing / Han Cong	China	84.41	2022 Winter Olympics
2	Evgenia Tarasova / Vladimir Morozov	Russia	84.25	2022 Winter Olympics
3	Anastasia Mishina / Aleksandr Galliamov	Russia	82.76	2022 Winter Olympics
4	Aleksandra Boikova / Dmitrii Kozlovskii	Russia	78.59	2022 Winter Olympics
5	Alexa Knierim / Brandon Frazier	United States	76.88	2022 Worlds
6	Peng Cheng / Jin Yang	China	76.71	2021 Gran Premio d'Italia
7	Ashley Cain-Gribble / Timothy LeDuc	United States	75.85	2022 Worlds
8	Riku Miura / Ryuichi Kihara	Japan	74.45	2022 Winter Olympics (team)
9	Daria Pavliuchenko / Denis Khodykin	Russia	73.91	2021 Rostelecom Cup
10	Iuliia Artemeva / Mikhail Nazarychev	Russia	73.02	2021 Internationaux de France
11	Vanessa James / Eric Radford	Canada	71.84	2021 Internationaux de France
12	Alina Pepeleva / Roman Pleshkov	Russia	69.42	2021 Warsaw Cup
13	Yasmina Kadyrova / Ivan Balchenko	Russia	69.39	2021 Rostelecom Cup
14	Jessica Calalang / Brian Johnson	United States	68.87	2021 Skate America
15	Audrey Lu / Misha Mitrofanov	United States	68.35	2022 Four Continents
16	Minerva Fabienne Hase / Nolan Seegert	Germany	67.93	2021 Skate Canada
17	Karina Safina / Luka Berulava	Georgia	67.77	2022 Junior Worlds
18	Kirsten Moore-Towers / Michael Marinaro	Canada	67.34	2022 Winter Olympics (team)
19	Anastasiia Metelkina / Daniil Parkman	Georgia	65.97	2021 Golden Spin of Zagreb
20	Evelyn Walsh / Trennt Michaud	Canada	65.42	2022 Four Continents

==== Best free skating score ====
Rank	Skaters	Nation	Score	Event
1	Anastasia Mishina / Aleksandr Galliamov	Russia	157.46	2022 Europeans
2	Sui Wenjing / Han Cong	China	155.47	2022 Winter Olympics
3	Evgenia Tarasova / Vladimir Morozov	Russia	155.00	2022 Winter Olympics
4	Aleksandra Boikova / Dmitrii Kozlovskii	Russia	150.97	2022 Europeans
5	Alexa Knierim / Brandon Frazier	United States	144.21	2022 Worlds
6	Riku Miura / Ryuichi Kihara	Japan	141.04	2022 Winter Olympics
7	Peng Cheng / Jin Yang	China	138.74	2022 Winter Olympics
8	Daria Pavliuchenko / Denis Khodykin	Russia	138.68	2021 Rostelecom Cup
9	Jessica Calalang / Brian Johnson	United States	135.16	2021 Warsaw Cup
10	Iuliia Artemeva / Mikhail Nazarychev	Russia	132.13	2021 Internationaux de France
11	Ashley Cain-Gribble / Timothy LeDuc	United States	132.04	2021 NHK Trophy
12	Vanessa James / Eric Radford	Canada	130.83	2021 Golden Spin of Zagreb
13	Audrey Lu / Misha Mitrofanov	United States	128.91	2021 Golden Spin of Zagreb
14	Karina Safina / Luka Berulava	Georgia	126.33	2022 Winter Olympics
15	Yasmina Kadyrova / Ivan Balchenko	Russia	125.41	2021 Warsaw Cup
16	Ekaterina Chikmareva / Matvei Ianchenkov	Russia	124.99	2021 JGP Russia
17	Laura Barquero / Marco Zandron	Spain	124.66	2021 Finlandia Trophy
18	Natalia Khabibullina / Ilya Knyazhuk	Russia	124.61	2021 JGP Austria
19	Anastasiia Metelkina / Daniil Parkman	Georgia	123.63	2021 Golden Spin of Zagreb
20	Minerva Fabienne Hase / Nolan Seegert	Germany	123.32	2022 Worlds

=== Ice dance ===
==== Best total score ====
Rank	Skaters	Nation	Score	Event
1	Gabriella Papadakis / Guillaume Cizeron	France	229.82	2022 Worlds
2	Madison Hubbell / Zachary Donohue	United States	222.39	2022 Worlds
3	Victoria Sinitsina / Nikita Katsalapov	Russia	220.51	2022 Winter Olympics
4	Madison Chock / Evan Bates	United States	216.83	2022 Worlds
5	Alexandra Stepanova / Ivan Bukin	Russia	213.20	2022 Europeans
6	Piper Gilles / Paul Poirier	Canada	210.97	2021 Skate Canada
7	Charlène Guignard / Marco Fabbri	Italy	209.92	2022 Worlds
8	Caroline Green / Michael Parsons	United States	200.59	2022 Four Continents
9	Diana Davis / Gleb Smolkin	Russia	199.90	2021 Warsaw Cup
10	Olivia Smart / Adrián Díaz	Spain	199.11	2022 Winter Olympics
11	Lilah Fear / Lewis Gibson	Great Britain	198.17	2022 Worlds
12	Anastasia Skoptsova / Kirill Aleshin	Russia	195.06	2021 Denis Ten Memorial
13	Laurence Fournier Beaudry / Nikolaj Sørensen	Canada	194.67	2021 Cup of Austria
14	Sara Hurtado / Kirill Khaliavin	Spain	191.90	2022 Europeans
15	Kaitlin Hawayek / Jean-Luc Baker	United States	191.61	2022 Worlds
16	Kana Muramoto / Daisuke Takahashi	Japan	190.16	2021 Warsaw Cup
17	Oleksandra Nazarova / Maksym Nikitin	Ukraine	188.64	2021 Denis Ten Memorial
18	Marjorie Lajoie / Zachary Lagha	Canada	187.38	2021 NHK Trophy
19	Elizaveta Khudaiberdieva / Egor Bazin	Russia	186.80	2021 Denis Ten Memorial
20	Juulia Turkkila / Matthias Versluis	Finland	185.19	2021 Finlandia Trophy

==== Best rhythm dance score ====
Rank	Skaters	Nation	Score	Event
1	Gabriella Papadakis / Guillaume Cizeron	France	92.73	2022 Worlds
2	Madison Hubbell / Zachary Donohue	United States	89.72	2022 Worlds
3	Victoria Sinitsina / Nikita Katsalapov	Russia	88.85	2022 Winter Olympics
4	Madison Chock / Evan Bates	United States	87.51	2022 Worlds
5	Alexandra Stepanova / Ivan Bukin	Russia	86.45	2022 Europeans
6	Piper Gilles / Paul Poirier	Canada	85.65	2021 Skate Canada
7	Charlène Guignard / Marco Fabbri	Italy	84.22	2022 Worlds
8	Diana Davis / Gleb Smolkin	Russia	81.30	2021 Warsaw Cup
9	Caroline Green / Michael Parsons	United States	80.62	2022 Four Continents
10	Lilah Fear / Lewis Gibson	Great Britain	79.97	2022 Europeans
11	Olivia Smart / Adrián Díaz	Spain	79.40	2022 Worlds
12	Laurence Fournier Beaudry / Nikolaj Sørensen	Canada	78.54	2022 Winter Olympics
13	Anastasia Skoptsova / Kirill Aleshin	Russia	78.39	2021 Denis Ten Memorial
14	Elizaveta Khudaiberdieva / Egor Bazin	Russia	77.08	2021 Denis Ten Memorial
15	Kaitlin Hawayek / Jean-Luc Baker	United States	76.56	2022 Worlds
16	Sara Hurtado / Kirill Khaliavin	Spain	76.40	2021 NHK Trophy
17	Kana Muramoto / Daisuke Takahashi	Japan	75.87	2021 Warsaw Cup
18	Allison Reed / Saulius Ambrulevičius	Lithuania	75.81	2021 Golden Spin of Zagreb
19	Oleksandra Nazarova / Maksym Nikitin	Ukraine	75.46	2021 Denis Ten Memorial
20	Wang Shiyue / Liu Xinyu	China	74.66	2022 Winter Olympics (team)

==== Best free dance score ====
Rank	Skaters	Nation	Score	Event
1	Gabriella Papadakis / Guillaume Cizeron	France	137.09	2022 Worlds
2	Madison Hubbell / Zachary Donohue	United States	132.67	2022 Worlds
3	Victoria Sinitsina / Nikita Katsalapov	Russia	131.66	2022 Winter Olympics
4	Madison Chock / Evan Bates	United States	130.63	2022 Winter Olympics
5	Alexandra Stepanova / Ivan Bukin	Russia	126.75	2022 Europeans
6	Charlène Guignard / Marco Fabbri	Italy	126.10	2021 Cup of Austria
7	Piper Gilles / Paul Poirier	Canada	125.62	2021 Autumn Classic
8	Olivia Smart / Adrián Díaz	Spain	121.41	2022 Winter Olympics
9	Caroline Green / Michael Parsons	United States	119.97	2022 Four Continents
10	Lilah Fear / Lewis Gibson	Great Britain	119.28	2022 Worlds
11	Diana Davis / Gleb Smolkin	Russia	118.60	2021 Warsaw Cup
12	Laurence Fournier Beaudry / Nikolaj Sørensen	Canada	117.29	2021 Cup of Austria
13	Kaitlin Hawayek / Jean-Luc Baker	United States	116.72	2021 Golden Spin of Zagreb
14	Anastasia Skoptsova / Kirill Aleshin	Russia	116.67	2021 Denis Ten Memorial
15	Sara Hurtado / Kirill Khaliavin	Spain	116.07	2022 Europeans
16	Kana Muramoto / Daisuke Takahashi	Japan	114.29	2021 Warsaw Cup
17	Juulia Turkkila / Matthias Versluis	Finland	113.27	2021 Finlandia Trophy
18	Oleksandra Nazarova / Maksym Nikitin	Ukraine	113.18	2021 Denis Ten Memorial
19	Marjorie Lajoie / Zachary Lagha	Canada	112.93	2021 NHK Trophy
20	Wang Shiyue / Liu Xinyu	China	111.31	2021 Gran Premio d'Italia

=== Highest element scores ===
GOE = Grade of Execution
BV = Base value

Note: An 'x' after the base value means that the base value has been multiplied by 1.1 because the jump was executed in the second half of the program. A 'q' means that the jump was landed on the quarter (missing rotation of exactly one quarter revolution and receives full base value). A '<' indicates that the jump was under-rotated (missing rotation of more than one quarter revolution, but less than one half revolution). A '!' means an unclear edge on the takeoff of the jump.

==== Men ====
===== Highest valued single jumps =====
Rank	Skater	Element	BV	GOE	Score	Event	Ref
1	(United States) Nathan Chen	4Lz	11.50	4.93	16.43	2022 Winter Olympics	Details
2	(Japan) Shoma Uno	4F	12.10 x	3.93	16.03	2022 Worlds	Details
3	(China) Jin Boyang	4Lz	11.50	4.11	15.61	2022 Winter Olympics	Details
3	(United States) Ilia Malinin	4Lz	11.50	4.11	15.61	2022 Worlds	Details
3	(United States) Ilia Malinin	4Lz	11.50	4.11	15.61	2022 Worlds	Details
6	(United States) Vincent Zhou	4Lz	11.50	4.03	15.53	2021 Nebelhorn Trophy	Details
7	(United States) Nathan Chen	4F	11.00	4.40	15.40	2022 Winter Olympics	Details
8	(Japan) Shun Sato	4Lz	11.50	3.78	15.28	2021 Internationaux de France	Details
9	(United States) Nathan Chen	4F	11.00	4.24	15.24	2022 Winter Olympics (team)	Details
9	(United States) Nathan Chen	4F	11.00	4.24	15.24	2022 Winter Olympics	Details

===== Highest valued combos =====
Rank	Skater	Element	BV	GOE	Score	Event	Ref
1	(United States) Nathan Chen	4Lz+3T	17.27 x	3.94	21.21	2022 Winter Olympics	Details
2	(United States) Nathan Chen	4Lz+3T	17.27 x	3.45	20.72	2022 Winter Olympics (team)	Details
3	(United States) Nathan Chen	4F+3T	15.20	4.40	19.60	2022 Winter Olympics	Details
4	(Japan) Yuma Kagiyama	4T+1Eu+3S	15.73 x	3.66	19.39	2022 Worlds	Details
5	(United States) Vincent Zhou	4Lz+3T	15.70	3.61	19.31	2021 Skate America	Details
5	(United States) Vincent Zhou	4Lz+3T	15.70	3.61	19.31	2021 NHK Trophy	Details
7	(United States) Nathan Chen	4T+1Eu+3F	16.83 x	2.17	19.00	2021 Skate Canada	Details
8	(Russia) Alexander Samarin	4Lz+3T	15.70	3.29	18.99	2021 NHK Trophy	Details
9	(Russia) Mark Kondratiuk	4S+1Eu+3S	15.95 x	2.91	18.86	2022 Europeans	Details
10	(Japan) Yuma Kagiyama	4T+1Eu+3S	15.73 x	3.12	18.85	2022 Winter Olympics (team)	Details
10	(Japan) Yuzuru Hanyu	4T+1Eu+3S	15.73 x	3.12	18.85	2022 Winter Olympics	Details

==== Women ====
===== Highest valued single jumps =====
Rank	Skater	Element	BV	GOE	Score	Event	Ref
1	(Russia) Alexandra Trusova	4F	11.00	4.71	15.71	2022 Europeans	Details
2	(Russia) Anna Shcherbakova	4F	11.00	3.77	14.77	2022 Winter Olympics	Details
3	(Russia) Anna Shcherbakova	4F	11.00	3.14	14.14	2022 Europeans	Details
4	(Russia) Kamila Valieva	4S	9.70	4.43	14.13	2022 Europeans	Details
5	(Russia) Anna Shcherbakova	4F	11.00	2.99	13.99	2021 Gran Premio d'Italia	Details
6	(Russia) Alexandra Trusova	4Lz	11.50	2.30	13.80	2021 Skate America	Details
7	(Russia) Kamila Valieva	4S	9.70	4.02	13.72	2022 Winter Olympics (team)	Details
8	(Russia) Kamila Valieva	4S	9.70	3.88	13.58	2021 Rostelecom Cup	Details
8	(Russia) Alexandra Trusova	4S	9.70	3.88	13.58	2022 Europeans	Details
10	(Russia) Alexandra Trusova	4F!	11.00	2.20	13.20	2022 Winter Olympics	Details

===== Highest valued combos =====
Rank	Skater	Element	BV	GOE	Score	Event	Ref
1	(Russia) Alexandra Trusova	4Lz+3T	17.27 x	2.63	19.90	2022 Winter Olympics	Details
2	(Russia) Kamila Valieva	4T+1Eu+3S	15.73 x	3.33	19.06	2021 Finlandia Trophy	Details
3	(Russia) Kamila Valieva	4T+1Eu+3S	15.73 x	2.99	18.72	2021 Skate Canada	Details
4	(Russia) Anna Shcherbakova	4F+3T	15.20	3.46	18.66	2022 Winter Olympics	Details
5	(Russia) Kamila Valieva	4T+3T	13.70	4.21	17.91	2021 Rostelecom Cup	Details
6	(Russia) Kamila Valieva	4T+3T	13.70	4.07	17.77	2022 Europeans	Details
7	(Russia) Kamila Valieva	4T+3T	13.70	3.80	17.50	2021 Finlandia Trophy	Details
8	(Russia) Kamila Valieva	4T+3T	13.70	3.12	16.82	2021 Skate Canada	Details
8	(Russia) Kamila Valieva	4T+3T	13.70	3.12	16.82	2022 Winter Olympics (team)	Details
10	(Russia) Sofia Akateva	4T+3T	13.70	2.58	16.28	2021 JGP Russia	Details

===== Highest valued single triple Axels =====
Rank	Skater	Element	BV	GOE	Score	Event	Ref
1	(Russia) Kamila Valieva	3A	8.00	3.54	11.54	2022 Europeans	Details
2	(Russia) Kamila Valieva	3A	8.00	3.31	11.31	2021 Rostelecom Cup	Details
2	(Russia) Kamila Valieva	3A	8.00	3.31	11.31	2022 Winter Olympics (team)	Details
2	(Russia) Kamila Valieva	3A	8.00	3.31	11.31	2022 Winter Olympics (team)	Details
5	(Russia) Kamila Valieva	3A	8.00	2.74	10.74	2021 Rostelecom Cup	Details
6	(Japan) Wakaba Higuchi	3A	8.00	2.40	10.40	2021 Cup of Austria	Details
7	(Russia) Sofia Akateva	3A	8.00	2.17	10.17	2021 JGP Russia	Details
8	(Japan) Mana Kawabe	3A	8.00	2.06	10.06	2021 NHK Trophy	Details
9	(Belarus) Varvara Kisel	3A	8.00	1.94	9.94	2021 JGP Austria	Details
10	(Japan) Wakaba Higuchi	3A	8.00	1.83	9.83	2022 Winter Olympics	Details

==== Pairs ====
===== Highest valued twists =====
Rank	Skaters	Element	BV	GOE	Score	Event	Ref
1	(China) Sui Wenjing / Han Cong	4Tw3	7.60	2.82	10.42	2022 Winter Olympics	Details
2	(Russia) Evgenia Tarasova / Vladimir Morozov	3Tw4	6.00	3.00	9.00	2022 Winter Olympics	Details
2	(Russia) Evgenia Tarasova / Vladimir Morozov	3Tw4	6.00	3.00	9.00	2022 Winter Olympics	Details
4	(Russia) Evgenia Tarasova / Vladimir Morozov	3Tw4	6.00	2.88	8.88	2021 Warsaw Cup	Details
5	(Russia) Evgenia Tarasova / Vladimir Morozov	3Tw4	6.00	2.83	8.83	2022 Europeans	Details
6	(Russia) Ekaterina Chikmareva / Matvei Ianchenkov	3Tw4	6.00	2.74	8.74	2021 JGP Russia	Details
6	(Russia) Evgenia Tarasova / Vladimir Morozov	3Tw4	6.00	2.74	8.74	2022 Europeans	Details
8	(Russia) Evgenia Tarasova / Vladimir Morozov	3Tw4	6.00	2.70	8.70	2021 Finlandia Trophy	Details
9	(Russia) Evgenia Tarasova / Vladimir Morozov	3Tw4	6.00	2.66	8.66	2021 Skate America	Details
10	(Russia) Evgenia Tarasova / Vladimir Morozov	3Tw4	6.00	2.57	8.57	2021 Skate America	Details
10	(China) Sui Wenjing / Han Cong	3Tw4	6.00	2.57	8.57	2021 Skate Canada	Details

===== Highest valued throw jumps =====
Rank	Skaters	Element	BV	GOE	Score	Event	Ref
1	(China) Sui Wenjing / Han Cong	3FTh	5.30	2.65	7.95	2022 Winter Olympics	Details
2	(China) Sui Wenjing / Han Cong	3FTh	5.30	2.57	7.87	2021 Skate Canada	Details
3	(Russia) Anastasia Mishina / Aleksandr Galliamov	3FTh	5.30	2.50	7.80	2022 Winter Olympics	Details
3	(China) Sui Wenjing / Han Cong	3FTh	5.30	2.50	7.80	2022 Winter Olympics	Details
5	(China) Sui Wenjing / Han Cong	3FTh	5.30	2.42	7.72	2021 Gran Premio d'Italia	Details
6	(Russia) Aleksandra Boikova / Dmitrii Kozlovskii	3FTh	5.30	2.35	7.65	2022 Winter Olympics	Details
7	(Russia) Aleksandra Boikova / Dmitrii Kozlovskii	3FTh	5.30	2.27	7.57	2022 Europeans	Details
7	(Russia) Evgenia Tarasova / Vladimir Morozov	3FTh	5.30	2.27	7.57	2022 Europeans	Details
7	(Russia) Anastasia Mishina / Aleksandr Galliamov	3FTh	5.30	2.27	7.57	2022 Europeans	Details
7	(Russia) Anastasia Mishina / Aleksandr Galliamov	3FTh	5.30	2.27	7.57	2022 Winter Olympics (team)	Details
7	(Russia) Anastasia Mishina / Aleksandr Galliamov	3FTh	5.30	2.27	7.57	2022 Winter Olympics (team)	Details

===== Highest valued lifts =====
Rank	Skaters	Element	BV	GOE	Score	Event	Ref
1	(Russia) Evgenia Tarasova / Vladimir Morozov	5ALi4	7.00	3.36	10.36	2021 Warsaw Cup	Details
2	(Russia) Evgenia Tarasova / Vladimir Morozov	5ALi4	7.00	3.30	10.30	2022 Europeans	Details
3	(Russia) Anastasia Mishina / Aleksandr Galliamov	5RLi4	7.00	3.20	10.20	2022 Europeans	Details
4	(Russia) Evgenia Tarasova / Vladimir Morozov	5ALi4	7.00	3.15	10.15	2021 Finlandia Trophy	Details
5	(Russia) Evgenia Tarasova / Vladimir Morozov	5ALi4	7.00	3.10	10.10	2022 Winter Olympics	Details
6	(China) Sui Wenjing / Han Cong	5ALi4	7.00	3.00	10.00	2022 Winter Olympics	Details
7	(United States) Jessica Calalang / Brian Johnson	5ALi4	7.00	2.94	9.94	2021 Warsaw Cup	Details
8	(Russia) Aleksandra Boikova / Dmitrii Kozlovskii	5ALi4	7.00	2.90	9.90	2022 Europeans	Details
8	(Russia) Anastasia Mishina / Aleksandr Galliamov	5ALi4	7.00	2.90	9.90	2022 Europeans	Details
10	(United States) Jessica Calalang / Brian Johnson	5ALi4	7.00	2.80	9.80	2021 Finlandia Trophy	Details
10	(Russia) Anastasia Mishina / Aleksandr Galliamov	5RLi4	7.00	2.80	9.80	2021 Finlandia Trophy	Details
10	(Russia) Evgenia Tarasova / Vladimir Morozov	5ALi4	7.00	2.80	9.80	2021 Skate America	Details
10	(Russia) Evgenia Tarasova / Vladimir Morozov	5RLi4	7.00	2.80	9.80	2022 Europeans	Details
10	(China) Peng Cheng / Jin Yang	5RLi4	7.00	2.80	9.80	2022 Winter Olympics (team)	Details
10	(Russia) Anastasia Mishina / Aleksandr Galliamov	5ALi4	7.00	2.80	9.80	2022 Winter Olympics	Details
10	(Russia) Anastasia Mishina / Aleksandr Galliamov	5RLi4	7.00	2.80	9.80	2022 Winter Olympics	Details

===== Highest valued jump combos =====
Rank	Skaters	Element	BV	GOE	Score	Event	Ref
1	(Russia) Natalia Khabibullina / Ilya Knyazhuk	3Lz+1Eu+3S	10.70	1.01	11.71	2021 JGP Austria	Details
2	(Russia) Anastasia Mishina / Aleksandr Galliamov	3S+1Eu+3S	9.10	1.22	10.32	2021 Finlandia Trophy	Details
3	(Russia) Anastasia Mishina / Aleksandr Galliamov	3S+1Eu+3S	9.10	0.92	10.02	2021 NHK Trophy	Details
3	(Russia) Anastasia Mishina / Aleksandr Galliamov	3S+1Eu+3S	9.10	0.92	10.02	2021 Rostelecom Cup	Details
3	(Russia) Anastasia Mishina / Aleksandr Galliamov	3S+1Eu+3S	9.10	0.92	10.02	2022 Winter Olympics	Details
6	(Russia) Anastasia Mishina / Aleksandr Galiamov	3S+1Eu+3S	9.10	0.80	9.90	2022 Winter Olympics (team)	Details
7	(Russia) Anastasia Mishina / Aleksandr Galliamov	3S+1Eu+3S	9.10	0.18	9.28	2022 Europeans	Details
8	(Russia) Iuliia Artemeva / Mikhail Nazarychev	2A+1Eu+3S	8.10	0.80	8.90	2021 Gran Premio d'Italia	Details
8	(Russia) Iuliia Artemeva / Mikhail Nazarychev	2A+1Eu+3S	8.10	0.80	8.90	2021 Internationaux de France	Details
10	(Russia) Iuliia Artemeva / Mikhail Nazarychev	2A+1Eu+3S	8.10	0.69	8.79	2021 Golden Spin of Zagreb	Details

== World Standings and Season's World Ranking ==
=== Current World Standings (top 30) ===
==== Men ====
As of April 16, 2022.

Rank	Nation	Skater	Points	Season	ISU Championships or Olympics	(Junior) Grand Prix and Final		Selected International Competition	
Rank	Nation	Skater	Points	Season	Best	Best	2nd Best	Best	2nd Best
1	USA	Nathan Chen	3964	2021/2022 season (100%)	1200	400	324		
1	USA	Nathan Chen	3964	2020/2021 season (100%)	1200				
1	USA	Nathan Chen	3964	2019/2020 season (70%)		560	280		
2	JPN	Yuma Kagiyama	3564	2021/2022 season (100%)	1080	400	400	250	
2	JPN	Yuma Kagiyama	3564	2020/2021 season (100%)	1080				
2	JPN	Yuma Kagiyama	3564	2019/2020 season (70%)	(476)	179	175		
3	JPN	Shoma Uno	3558	2021/2022 season (100%)	1200	400	360		
3	JPN	Shoma Uno	3558	2020/2021 season (100%)	875				
3	JPN	Shoma Uno	3558	2019/2020 season (70%)		204	134	210	175
4	GEO	Morisi Kvitelashvili	3091	2021/2022 season (100%)	875	400	236	243	144
4	GEO	Morisi Kvitelashvili	3091	2020/2021 season (100%)	(305)				
4	GEO	Morisi Kvitelashvili	3091	2019/2020 season (70%)	476	204	149	189	175
5	ITA	Daniel Grassl	3031	2021/2022 season (100%)	756	324	213	300	270
5	ITA	Daniel Grassl	3031	2020/2021 season (100%)	(377)				
5	ITA	Daniel Grassl	3031	2019/2020 season (70%)	428	175	145	210	210
6	USA	Jason Brown	2976	2021/2022 season (100%)	709	360	324	300	
6	USA	Jason Brown	2976	2020/2021 season (100%)	638				
6	USA	Jason Brown	2976	2019/2020 season (70%)	(529)	252	183	210	
7	JPN	Yuzuru Hanyu	2841	2021/2022 season (100%)	875				
7	JPN	Yuzuru Hanyu	2841	2020/2021 season (100%)	972				
7	JPN	Yuzuru Hanyu	2841	2019/2020 season (70%)	(588)	504	280	210	
8	CAN	Keegan Messing	2722	2021/2022 season (100%)	418	262	236	300	219
8	CAN	Keegan Messing	2722	2020/2021 season (100%)	709				
8	CAN	Keegan Messing	2722	2019/2020 season (70%)	(281)	204	204	170	
9	ITA	Matteo Rizzo	2586	2021/2022 season (100%)	465	262	262	250	178
9	ITA	Matteo Rizzo	2586	2020/2021 season (100%)	418				
9	ITA	Matteo Rizzo	2586	2019/2020 season (70%)	(386)	227	165	189	170
10	LAT	Deniss Vasiljevs	2530	2021/2022 season (100%)	680	292	292	219	182
10	LAT	Deniss Vasiljevs	2530	2020/2021 season (100%)	(200)				
10	LAT	Deniss Vasiljevs	2530	2019/2020 season (70%)	347	183	165	170	
11	USA	Vincent Zhou	2452	2021/2022 season (100%)	972	400	360	300	250
11	USA	Vincent Zhou	2452	2020/2021 season (100%)					
11	USA	Vincent Zhou	2452	2019/2020 season (70%)				170	
12	KOR	Cha Jun-hwan	2343	2021/2022 season (100%)	840	324	262		
12	KOR	Cha Jun-hwan	2343	2020/2021 season (100%)	465				
12	KOR	Cha Jun-hwan	2343	2019/2020 season (70%)	(386)	165	134	153	
13	JPN	Kazuki Tomono	2307	2021/2022 season (100%)	756	324	236	250	
13	JPN	Kazuki Tomono	2307	2020/2021 season (100%)					
13	JPN	Kazuki Tomono	2307	2019/2020 season (70%)	312	183	134	112	
14	RUS	Dmitri Aliev	2299	2021/2022 season (100%)		262		243	225
14	RUS	Dmitri Aliev	2299	2020/2021 season (100%)					
14	RUS	Dmitri Aliev	2299	2019/2020 season (70%)	588	330	252	210	189
15	RUS	Andrei Mozalev	2294	2021/2022 season (100%)	612	213		270	243
15	RUS	Andrei Mozalev	2294	2020/2021 season (100%)					
15	RUS	Andrei Mozalev	2294	2019/2020 season (70%)	350	221	175	210	
16	CHN	Jin Boyang	2219	2021/2022 season (100%)	517	213		203	
16	CHN	Jin Boyang	2219	2020/2021 season (100%)	(131)				
16	CHN	Jin Boyang	2219	2019/2020 season (70%)	428	368	280	210	
17	RUS	Evgeni Semenenko	2064	2021/2022 season (100%)	574	324	236	198	
17	RUS	Evgeni Semenenko	2064	2020/2021 season (100%)	574				
17	RUS	Evgeni Semenenko	2064	2019/2020 season (70%)				158	
18	FRA	Kévin Aymoz	2018	2021/2022 season (100%)	446			160	
18	FRA	Kévin Aymoz	2018	2020/2021 season (100%)	517				
18	FRA	Kévin Aymoz	2018	2019/2020 season (70%)		454	252	189	
19	FRA	Adam Siao Him Fa	1991	2021/2022 season (100%)	574	191		270	270
19	FRA	Adam Siao Him Fa	1991	2020/2021 season (100%)					
19	FRA	Adam Siao Him Fa	1991	2019/2020 season (70%)	205	115	84	170	112
20	USA	Camden Pulkinen	1989	2021/2022 season (100%)	787	213		182	
20	USA	Camden Pulkinen	1989	2020/2021 season (100%)					
20	USA	Camden Pulkinen	1989	2019/2020 season (70%)	205	204	134	139	125
21	RUS	Mark Kondratiuk	1877	2021/2022 season (100%)	840	191		270	243
21	RUS	Mark Kondratiuk	1877	2020/2021 season (100%)					
21	RUS	Mark Kondratiuk	1877	2019/2020 season (70%)				175	158
22	RUS	Alexander Samarin	1874	2021/2022 season (100%)		236	191	203	
22	RUS	Alexander Samarin	1874	2020/2021 season (100%)					
22	RUS	Alexander Samarin	1874	2019/2020 season (70%)	228	408	280	175	153
23	USA	Ilia Malinin	1802	2021/2022 season (100%)	517	250	250	250	243
23	USA	Ilia Malinin	1802	2020/2021 season (100%)					
23	USA	Ilia Malinin	1802	2019/2020 season (70%)	72	127	93		
24	RUS	Mikhail Kolyada	1777	2021/2022 season (100%)		360	360	270	
24	RUS	Mikhail Kolyada	1777	2020/2021 season (100%)	787				
24	RUS	Mikhail Kolyada	1777	2019/2020 season (70%)					
25	JPN	Shun Sato	1679	2021/2022 season (100%)		360	292	225	
25	JPN	Shun Sato	1679	2020/2021 season (100%)					
25	JPN	Shun Sato	1679	2019/2020 season (70%)	207	245	175	175	
26	RUS	Petr Gumennik	1543	2021/2022 season (100%)		191		300	243
26	RUS	Petr Gumennik	1543	2020/2021 season (100%)					
26	RUS	Petr Gumennik	1543	2019/2020 season (70%)	284	175	161	189	
27	EST	Mihhail Selevko	1493	2021/2022 season (100%)	295	148	148	225	219
27	EST	Mihhail Selevko	1493	2020/2021 season (100%)					
27	EST	Mihhail Selevko	1493	2019/2020 season (70%)		76	68	175	139
28	AUS	Brendan Kerry	1485	2021/2022 season (100%)	496			178	160
28	AUS	Brendan Kerry	1485	2020/2021 season (100%)					
28	AUS	Brendan Kerry	1485	2019/2020 season (70%)	185	149		175	142
29	JPN	Sōta Yamamoto	1472	2021/2022 season (100%)		213	213	300	203
29	JPN	Sōta Yamamoto	1472	2020/2021 season (100%)					
29	JPN	Sōta Yamamoto	1472	2019/2020 season (70%)		165		189	189
30	EST	Aleksandr Selevko	1383	2021/2022 season (100%)				250	225
30	EST	Aleksandr Selevko	1383	2020/2021 season (100%)	247				
30	EST	Aleksandr Selevko	1383	2019/2020 season (70%)	151	115	84	158	153

==== Women ====
As of April 17, 2022.

Rank	Nation	Skater	Points	Season	ISU Championships or Olympics	(Junior) Grand Prix and Final		Selected International Competition	
Rank	Nation	Skater	Points	Season	Best	Best	2nd Best	Best	2nd Best
1	RUS	Anna Shcherbakova	4419	2021/2022 season (100%)	1200	400	400	225	
1	RUS	Anna Shcherbakova	4419	2020/2021 season (100%)	1200				
1	RUS	Anna Shcherbakova	4419	2019/2020 season (70%)	(529)	504	280	210	
2	RUS	Alexandra Trusova	3646	2021/2022 season (100%)	1080	400		250	
2	RUS	Alexandra Trusova	3646	2020/2021 season (100%)	972				
2	RUS	Alexandra Trusova	3646	2019/2020 season (70%)	(476)	454	280	210	
3	JPN	Kaori Sakamoto	3423	2021/2022 season (100%)	1200	400	292	225	
3	JPN	Kaori Sakamoto	3423	2020/2021 season (100%)	709				
3	JPN	Kaori Sakamoto	3423	2019/2020 season (70%)	(386)	204	204	189	
4	KOR	You Young	3254	2021/2022 season (100%)	787	324	324	270	225
4	KOR	You Young	3254	2020/2021 season (100%)					
4	KOR	You Young	3254	2019/2020 season (70%)	529	227	204	189	175
5	RUS	Elizaveta Tuktamysheva	2923	2021/2022 season (100%)		360	360	270	
5	RUS	Elizaveta Tuktamysheva	2923	2020/2021 season (100%)	1080				
5	RUS	Elizaveta Tuktamysheva	2923	2019/2020 season (70%)		227	227	210	189
6	USA	Alysa Liu	2806	2021/2022 season (100%)	972	292	262	300	300
6	USA	Alysa Liu	2806	2020/2021 season (100%)					
6	USA	Alysa Liu	2806	2019/2020 season (70%)	284	221	175		
7	RUS	Kamila Valieva	2745	2021/2022 season (100%)	875	400	400	300	
7	RUS	Kamila Valieva	2745	2020/2021 season (100%)					
7	RUS	Kamila Valieva	2745	2019/2020 season (70%)	350	245	175		
8	BEL	Loena Hendrickx	2672	2021/2022 season (100%)	1080	324	262	219	
8	BEL	Loena Hendrickx	2672	2020/2021 season (100%)	787				
8	BEL	Loena Hendrickx	2672	2019/2020 season (70%)					
9	RUS	Alena Kostornaia	2565	2021/2022 season (100%)		360	324	243	
9	RUS	Alena Kostornaia	2565	2020/2021 season (100%)					
9	RUS	Alena Kostornaia	2565	2019/2020 season (70%)	588	560	280	210	
10	USA	Karen Chen	2553	2021/2022 season (100%)	574	262		219	178
10	USA	Karen Chen	2553	2020/2021 season (100%)	875				
10	USA	Karen Chen	2553	2019/2020 season (70%)	(312)	134		158	153
11	JPN	Wakaba Higuchi	2506	2021/2022 season (100%)	787	324	236	300	
11	JPN	Wakaba Higuchi	2506	2020/2021 season (100%)					
11	JPN	Wakaba Higuchi	2506	2019/2020 season (70%)	428	165	165	101	
12	JPN	Rika Kihira	2271	2021/2022 season (100%)					
12	JPN	Rika Kihira	2271	2020/2021 season (100%)	638				
12	JPN	Rika Kihira	2271	2019/2020 season (70%)	588	408	252	210	175
13	USA	Mariah Bell	2270	2021/2022 season (100%)	875	292	236	203	
13	USA	Mariah Bell	2270	2020/2021 season (100%)					
13	USA	Mariah Bell	2270	2019/2020 season (70%)		227	227	210	
14	AZE	Ekaterina Ryabova	2138	2021/2022 season (100%)	517	213		270	250
14	AZE	Ekaterina Ryabova	2138	2020/2021 season (100%)	377				
14	AZE	Ekaterina Ryabova	2138	2019/2020 season (70%)	(347)	183		170	158
15	KOR	Kim Ye-lim	2016	2021/2022 season (100%)	680	236	191		
15	KOR	Kim Ye-lim	2016	2020/2021 season (100%)	418				
15	KOR	Kim Ye-lim	2016	2019/2020 season (70%)	(347)	149		189	153
16	KOR	Lee Hae-in	2009	2021/2022 season (100%)	756	213		225	
16	KOR	Lee Hae-in	2009	2020/2021 season (100%)	465				
16	KOR	Lee Hae-in	2009	2019/2020 season (70%)	(230)	175	175		
17	POL	Ekaterina Kurakova	1912	2021/2022 season (100%)	551			270	270
17	POL	Ekaterina Kurakova	1912	2020/2021 season (100%)					
17	POL	Ekaterina Kurakova	1912	2019/2020 season (70%)	228	115	93	210	175
18	USA	Bradie Tennell	1802	2021/2022 season (100%)					
18	USA	Bradie Tennell	1802	2020/2021 season (100%)	517				
18	USA	Bradie Tennell	1802	2019/2020 season (70%)	476	368	252	189	
19	GER	Nicole Schott	1789	2021/2022 season (100%)	465	191		225	219
19	GER	Nicole Schott	1789	2020/2021 season (100%)	200				
19	GER	Nicole Schott	1789	2019/2020 season (70%)	(166)	149		170	170
20	RUS	Maiia Khromykh	1759	2021/2022 season (100%)		360	324	300	250
20	RUS	Maiia Khromykh	1759	2020/2021 season (100%)					
20	RUS	Maiia Khromykh	1759	2019/2020 season (70%)	256	142	127		
21	JPN	Mai Mihara	1674	2021/2022 season (100%)	840	292	292	250	
21	JPN	Mai Mihara	1674	2020/2021 season (100%)					
21	JPN	Mai Mihara	1674	2019/2020 season (70%)					
22	BLR	Viktoriia Safonova	1632	2021/2022 season (100%)	362	213		300	243
22	BLR	Viktoriia Safonova	1632	2020/2021 season (100%)					
22	BLR	Viktoriia Safonova	1632	2019/2020 season (70%)	150			189	175
23	USA	Starr Andrews	1520	2021/2022 season (100%)	362			198	198
23	USA	Starr Andrews	1520	2020/2021 season (100%)					
23	USA	Starr Andrews	1520	2019/2020 season (70%)	167	183	134	139	139
24	JPN	Satoko Miyahara	1496	2021/2022 season (100%)		262	213		
24	JPN	Satoko Miyahara	1496	2020/2021 season (100%)	180				
24	JPN	Satoko Miyahara	1496	2019/2020 season (70%)		252	204	210	175
25	SUI	Alexia Paganini	1465	2021/2022 season (100%)	325			219	219
25	SUI	Alexia Paganini	1465	2020/2021 season (100%)					
25	SUI	Alexia Paganini	1465	2019/2020 season (70%)	428	149		125	
26	USA	Amber Glenn	1456	2021/2022 season (100%)		236	213	270	
26	USA	Amber Glenn	1456	2020/2021 season (100%)					
26	USA	Amber Glenn	1456	2019/2020 season (70%)	253	165	149	170	
27	CAN	Madeline Schizas	1449	2021/2022 season (100%)	377	236	191	164	
27	CAN	Madeline Schizas	1449	2020/2021 season (100%)	339				
27	CAN	Madeline Schizas	1449	2019/2020 season (70%)				142	
28	KOR	Lim Eun-soo	1446	2021/2022 season (100%)		262	191		
28	KOR	Lim Eun-soo	1446	2020/2021 season (100%)					
28	KOR	Lim Eun-soo	1446	2019/2020 season (70%)	281	183	149	210	170
29	EST	Niina Petrõkina	1402	2021/2022 season (100%)	402	182	133	270	243
29	EST	Niina Petrõkina	1402	2020/2021 season (100%)					
29	EST	Niina Petrõkina	1402	2019/2020 season (70%)		104	68		
30	JPN	Rino Matsuike	1370	2021/2022 season (100%)	551	236	191	250	
30	JPN	Rino Matsuike	1370	2020/2021 season (100%)					
30	JPN	Rino Matsuike	1370	2019/2020 season (70%)		142			

==== Pairs ====
As of April 15, 2022.

Rank	Nation	Skaters	Points	Season	ISU Championships or Olympics	(Junior) Grand Prix and Final		Selected International Competition	
Rank	Nation	Skaters	Points	Season	Best	Best	2nd Best	Best	2nd Best
1	RUS	Anastasia Mishina / Aleksandr Galliamov	4391	2021/2022 season (100%)	972	400	400	300	
1	RUS	Anastasia Mishina / Aleksandr Galliamov	4391	2020/2021 season (100%)	1200				
1	RUS	Anastasia Mishina / Aleksandr Galliamov	4391	2019/2020 season (70%)		454	280	210	175
2	RUS	Evgenia Tarasova / Vladimir Morozov	3953	2021/2022 season (100%)	1080	400	360	300	270
2	RUS	Evgenia Tarasova / Vladimir Morozov	3953	2020/2021 season (100%)	875				
2	RUS	Evgenia Tarasova / Vladimir Morozov	3953	2019/2020 season (70%)	(529)	252	227	189	
3	CHN	Sui Wenjing / Han Cong	3920	2021/2022 season (100%)	1200	400	400		
3	CHN	Sui Wenjing / Han Cong	3920	2020/2021 season (100%)	1080				
3	CHN	Sui Wenjing / Han Cong	3920	2019/2020 season (70%)	(588)	560	280		
4	RUS	Aleksandra Boikova / Dmitrii Kozlovskii	3259	2021/2022 season (100%)	875	400	324		
4	RUS	Aleksandra Boikova / Dmitrii Kozlovskii	3259	2020/2021 season (100%)	972				
4	RUS	Aleksandra Boikova / Dmitrii Kozlovskii	3259	2019/2020 season (70%)	(588)	408	280		
5	USA	Ashley Cain-Gribble / Timothy LeDuc	3000	2021/2022 season (100%)	574	324	292	243	243
5	USA	Ashley Cain-Gribble / Timothy LeDuc	3000	2020/2021 season (100%)	517				
5	USA	Ashley Cain-Gribble / Timothy LeDuc	3000	2019/2020 season (70%)		204	183	210	210
6	USA	Alexa Knierim / Brandon Frazier	2929	2021/2022 season (100%)	1200	324	292	250	225
6	USA	Alexa Knierim / Brandon Frazier	2929	2020/2021 season (100%)	638				
6	USA	Alexa Knierim / Brandon Frazier	2929	2019/2020 season (70%)					
7	CHN	Peng Cheng / Jin Yang	2888	2021/2022 season (100%)	787	360			
7	CHN	Peng Cheng / Jin Yang	2888	2020/2021 season (100%)	787				
7	CHN	Peng Cheng / Jin Yang	2888	2019/2020 season (70%)	(529)	504	280	170	
8	JPN	Riku Miura / Ryuichi Kihara	2712	2021/2022 season (100%)	1080	360	324	300	
8	JPN	Riku Miura / Ryuichi Kihara	2712	2020/2021 season (100%)	465				
8	JPN	Riku Miura / Ryuichi Kihara	2712	2019/2020 season (70%)	(281)	183			
9	GER	Minerva Fabienne Hase / Nolan Seegert	2633	2021/2022 season (100%)	787	262	213	300	
9	GER	Minerva Fabienne Hase / Nolan Seegert	2633	2020/2021 season (100%)					
9	GER	Minerva Fabienne Hase / Nolan Seegert	2633	2019/2020 season (70%)	386	227	149	170	139
10	CAN	Kirsten Moore-Towers / Michael Marinaro	2513	2021/2022 season (100%)	(465)	262	236		
10	CAN	Kirsten Moore-Towers / Michael Marinaro	2513	2020/2021 season (100%)	709				
10	CAN	Kirsten Moore-Towers / Michael Marinaro	2513	2019/2020 season (70%)	476	368	252	210	
11	ITA	Rebecca Ghilardi / Filippo Ambrosini	2341	2021/2022 season (100%)	551	262	262	203	182
11	ITA	Rebecca Ghilardi / Filippo Ambrosini	2341	2020/2021 season (100%)	(222)				
11	ITA	Rebecca Ghilardi / Filippo Ambrosini	2341	2019/2020 season (70%)	281	149	134	175	142
12	USA	Audrey Lu / Misha Mitrofanov	2328	2021/2022 season (100%)	840	292	262	300	203
12	USA	Audrey Lu / Misha Mitrofanov	2328	2020/2021 season (100%)					
12	USA	Audrey Lu / Misha Mitrofanov	2328	2019/2020 season (70%)		134		158	139
13	ITA	Nicole Della Monica / Matteo Guarise	2253	2021/2022 season (100%)	(339)	292	213	250	
13	ITA	Nicole Della Monica / Matteo Guarise	2253	2020/2021 season (100%)	574				
13	ITA	Nicole Della Monica / Matteo Guarise	2253	2019/2020 season (70%)	428	204	134	158	
14	CAN	Vanessa James / Eric Radford	2045	2021/2022 season (100%)	972	292	292	270	219
14	CAN	Vanessa James / Eric Radford	2045	2020/2021 season (100%)					
14	CAN	Vanessa James / Eric Radford	2045	2019/2020 season (70%)					
15	AUT	Miriam Ziegler / Severin Kiefer	1962	2021/2022 season (100%)	638	191			
15	AUT	Miriam Ziegler / Severin Kiefer	1962	2020/2021 season (100%)	418				
15	AUT	Miriam Ziegler / Severin Kiefer	1962	2019/2020 season (70%)	(347)	204	183	175	153
16	CAN	Evelyn Walsh / Trennt Michaud	1812	2021/2022 season (100%)	709	236	191		
16	CAN	Evelyn Walsh / Trennt Michaud	1812	2020/2021 season (100%)	377				
16	CAN	Evelyn Walsh / Trennt Michaud	1812	2019/2020 season (70%)	(347)	165	134		
17	RUS	Daria Pavliuchenko / Denis Khodykin	1778	2021/2022 season (100%)		360	360		
17	RUS	Daria Pavliuchenko / Denis Khodykin	1778	2020/2021 season (100%)					
17	RUS	Daria Pavliuchenko / Denis Khodykin	1778	2019/2020 season (70%)	476	330	252		
18	USA	Jessica Calalang / Brian Johnson	1764	2021/2022 season (100%)		262		270	225
18	USA	Jessica Calalang / Brian Johnson	1764	2020/2021 season (100%)					
18	USA	Jessica Calalang / Brian Johnson	1764	2019/2020 season (70%)	428	204	165	210	
19	HUN	Ioulia Chtchetinina / Márk Magyar	1742	2021/2022 season (100%)	496	236	236	203	
19	HUN	Ioulia Chtchetinina / Márk Magyar	1742	2020/2021 season (100%)	305				
19	HUN	Ioulia Chtchetinina / Márk Magyar	1742	2019/2020 season (70%)	(228)			139	127
20	RUS	Iuliia Artemeva / Mikhail Nazarychev	1565	2021/2022 season (100%)		360	324	243	
20	RUS	Iuliia Artemeva / Mikhail Nazarychev	1565	2020/2021 season (100%)					
20	RUS	Iuliia Artemeva / Mikhail Nazarychev	1565	2019/2020 season (70%)	284	179	175		
21	GEO	Karina Safina / Luka Berulava	1546	2021/2022 season (100%)	875	225	203	243	
21	GEO	Karina Safina / Luka Berulava	1546	2020/2021 season (100%)					
21	GEO	Karina Safina / Luka Berulava	1546	2019/2020 season (70%)					
22	RUS	Alina Pepeleva / Roman Pleshkov	1522	2021/2022 season (100%)		236	236	219	164
22	RUS	Alina Pepeleva / Roman Pleshkov	1522	2020/2021 season (100%)					
22	RUS	Alina Pepeleva / Roman Pleshkov	1522	2019/2020 season (70%)		161	142	189	175
23	GER	Annika Hocke / Robert Kunkel	1315	2021/2022 season (100%)	(237)			219	
23	GER	Annika Hocke / Robert Kunkel	1315	2020/2021 season (100%)	339				
23	GER	Annika Hocke / Robert Kunkel	1315	2019/2020 season (70%)	312	145	142	158	
24	GBR	Zoe Jones / Christopher Boyadji	1102	2021/2022 season (100%)	465	191			
24	GBR	Zoe Jones / Christopher Boyadji	1102	2020/2021 season (100%)					
24	GBR	Zoe Jones / Christopher Boyadji	1102	2019/2020 season (70%)	185	134		127	
25	ITA	Sara Conti / Niccolò Macii	938	2021/2022 season (100%)	446	213		164	
25	ITA	Sara Conti / Niccolò Macii	938	2020/2021 season (100%)					
25	ITA	Sara Conti / Niccolò Macii	938	2019/2020 season (70%)				115	
25	USA	Emily Chan / Spencer Akira Howe	938	2021/2022 season (100%)	756			182	
25	USA	Emily Chan / Spencer Akira Howe	938	2020/2021 season (100%)					
25	USA	Emily Chan / Spencer Akira Howe	938	2019/2020 season (70%)					
27	USA	Anastasiia Smirnova / Danylo Siianytsia	924	2021/2022 season (100%)	365	182	148		
27	USA	Anastasiia Smirnova / Danylo Siianytsia	924	2020/2021 season (100%)					
27	USA	Anastasiia Smirnova / Danylo Siianytsia	924	2019/2020 season (70%)	136	93			
28	ESP	Laura Barquero / Marco Zandron	913	2021/2022 season (100%)	418			270	225
28	ESP	Laura Barquero / Marco Zandron	913	2020/2021 season (100%)					
28	ESP	Laura Barquero / Marco Zandron	913	2019/2020 season (70%)					
29	RUS	Kseniia Akhanteva / Valerii Kolesov	871	2021/2022 season (100%)		182			
29	RUS	Kseniia Akhanteva / Valerii Kolesov	871	2020/2021 season (100%)					
29	RUS	Kseniia Akhanteva / Valerii Kolesov	871	2019/2020 season (70%)	315	199	175		
30	NED	Daria Danilova / Michel Tsiba	863	2021/2022 season (100%)	517			225	
30	NED	Daria Danilova / Michel Tsiba	863	2020/2021 season (100%)					
30	NED	Daria Danilova / Michel Tsiba	863	2019/2020 season (70%)	121				

==== Ice dance ====
As of April 17, 2022.

Rank	Nation	Skaters	Points	Season	ISU Championships or Olympics	(Junior) Grand Prix and Final		Selected International Competition	
Rank	Nation	Skaters	Points	Season	Best	Best	2nd Best	Best	2nd Best
1	USA	Madison Chock / Evan Bates	4013	2021/2022 season (100%)	972	360	360	270	
1	USA	Madison Chock / Evan Bates	4013	2020/2021 season (100%)	875				
1	USA	Madison Chock / Evan Bates	4013	2019/2020 season (70%)	(588)	504	252	210	210
2	USA	Madison Hubbell / Zachary Donohue	3904	2021/2022 season (100%)	1080	400	360	250	
2	USA	Madison Hubbell / Zachary Donohue	3904	2020/2021 season (100%)	1080				
2	USA	Madison Hubbell / Zachary Donohue	3904	2019/2020 season (70%)	(476)	454	280		
3	RUS	Victoria Sinitsina / Nikita Katsalapov	3900	2021/2022 season (100%)	1080	400	400		
3	RUS	Victoria Sinitsina / Nikita Katsalapov	3900	2020/2021 season (100%)	1200				
3	RUS	Victoria Sinitsina / Nikita Katsalapov	3900	2019/2020 season (70%)	(588)	330	280	210	
4	ITA	Charlène Guignard / Marco Fabbri	3778	2021/2022 season (100%)	875	360	360	300	300
4	ITA	Charlène Guignard / Marco Fabbri	3778	2020/2021 season (100%)	709				
4	ITA	Charlène Guignard / Marco Fabbri	3778	2019/2020 season (70%)	(428)	227	227	210	210
5	CAN	Piper Gilles / Paul Poirier	3677	2021/2022 season (100%)	787	400	360	300	
5	CAN	Piper Gilles / Paul Poirier	3677	2020/2021 season (100%)	972				
5	CAN	Piper Gilles / Paul Poirier	3677	2019/2020 season (70%)	(529)	368	280	210	
6	FRA	Gabriella Papadakis / Guillaume Cizeron	3669	2021/2022 season (100%)	1200	400	400	300	
6	FRA	Gabriella Papadakis / Guillaume Cizeron	3669	2020/2021 season (100%)					
6	FRA	Gabriella Papadakis / Guillaume Cizeron	3669	2019/2020 season (70%)	529	560	280		
7	GBR	Lilah Fear / Lewis Gibson	3150	2021/2022 season (100%)	709	324	213	250	243
7	GBR	Lilah Fear / Lewis Gibson	3150	2020/2021 season (100%)	638				
7	GBR	Lilah Fear / Lewis Gibson	3150	2019/2020 season (70%)	(386)	227	204	189	153
8	CAN	Laurence Fournier Beaudry / Nikolaj Sørensen	3132	2021/2022 season (100%)	517	324	324	270	270
8	CAN	Laurence Fournier Beaudry / Nikolaj Sørensen	3132	2020/2021 season (100%)	574				
8	CAN	Laurence Fournier Beaudry / Nikolaj Sørensen	3132	2019/2020 season (70%)		227	227	210	189
9	RUS	Alexandra Stepanova / Ivan Bukin	2851	2021/2022 season (100%)	756	324	324		
9	RUS	Alexandra Stepanova / Ivan Bukin	2851	2020/2021 season (100%)	787				
9	RUS	Alexandra Stepanova / Ivan Bukin	2851	2019/2020 season (70%)	(476)	408	252		
10	ESP	Olivia Smart / Adrián Díaz	2784	2021/2022 season (100%)	638	324	292	270	243
10	ESP	Olivia Smart / Adrián Díaz	2784	2020/2021 season (100%)					
10	ESP	Olivia Smart / Adrián Díaz	2784	2019/2020 season (70%)	281	204	204	175	153
11	ESP	Sara Hurtado / Kirill Khaliavin	2748	2021/2022 season (100%)	496	292	292	243	198
11	ESP	Sara Hurtado / Kirill Khaliavin	2748	2020/2021 season (100%)	418				
11	ESP	Sara Hurtado / Kirill Khaliavin	2748	2019/2020 season (70%)	(312)	227	183	210	189
12	USA	Caroline Green / Michael Parsons	2525	2021/2022 season (100%)	840	292	262	250	243
12	USA	Caroline Green / Michael Parsons	2525	2020/2021 season (100%)					
12	USA	Caroline Green / Michael Parsons	2525	2019/2020 season (70%)		149	149	170	170
13	USA	Kaitlin Hawayek / Jean-Luc Baker	2229	2021/2022 season (100%)	574	262		300	
13	USA	Kaitlin Hawayek / Jean-Luc Baker	2229	2020/2021 season (100%)	517				
13	USA	Kaitlin Hawayek / Jean-Luc Baker	2229	2019/2020 season (70%)	(347)	204	183	189	
14	CAN	Carolane Soucisse / Shane Firus	2140	2021/2022 season (100%)	612	213	213	198	
14	CAN	Carolane Soucisse / Shane Firus	2140	2020/2021 season (100%)					
14	CAN	Carolane Soucisse / Shane Firus	2140	2019/2020 season (70%)	312	149	134	170	139
15	LTU	Allison Reed / Saulius Ambrulevičius	2136	2021/2022 season (100%)	465	213	191	270	225
15	LTU	Allison Reed / Saulius Ambrulevičius	2136	2020/2021 season (100%)	275				
15	LTU	Allison Reed / Saulius Ambrulevičius	2136	2019/2020 season (70%)	(205)	183		175	139
16	USA	Christina Carreira / Anthony Ponomarenko	2081	2021/2022 season (100%)	680	262	191	219	
16	USA	Christina Carreira / Anthony Ponomarenko	2081	2020/2021 season (100%)					
16	USA	Christina Carreira / Anthony Ponomarenko	2081	2019/2020 season (70%)		165	165	210	189
17	CAN	Marjorie Lajoie / Zachary Lagha	1988	2021/2022 season (100%)	418	262	236	219	
17	CAN	Marjorie Lajoie / Zachary Lagha	1988	2020/2021 season (100%)	(305)				
17	CAN	Marjorie Lajoie / Zachary Lagha	1988	2019/2020 season (70%)	386	165	149	153	
18	CHN	Wang Shiyue / Liu Xinyu	1831	2021/2022 season (100%)	377	292			
18	CHN	Wang Shiyue / Liu Xinyu	1831	2020/2021 season (100%)	(339)				
18	CHN	Wang Shiyue / Liu Xinyu	1831	2019/2020 season (70%)	428	204	183	189	158
18	GEO	Maria Kazakova / Georgy Reviya	1831	2021/2022 season (100%)	275			250	243
18	GEO	Maria Kazakova / Georgy Reviya	1831	2020/2021 season (100%)					
18	GEO	Maria Kazakova / Georgy Reviya	1831	2019/2020 season (70%)	315	245	175	170	158
20	RUS	Diana Davis / Gleb Smolkin	1779	2021/2022 season (100%)	446	262		300	225
20	RUS	Diana Davis / Gleb Smolkin	1779	2020/2021 season (100%)					
20	RUS	Diana Davis / Gleb Smolkin	1779	2019/2020 season (70%)	230	158	158		
21	FRA	Evgeniia Lopareva / Geoffrey Brissaud	1615	2021/2022 season (100%)	362	292	236	225	
21	FRA	Evgeniia Lopareva / Geoffrey Brissaud	1615	2020/2021 season (100%)	222				
21	FRA	Evgeniia Lopareva / Geoffrey Brissaud	1615	2019/2020 season (70%)	(134)			153	125
22	UKR	Oleksandra Nazarova / Maksym Nikitin	1609	2021/2022 season (100%)	325	191		270	250
22	UKR	Oleksandra Nazarova / Maksym Nikitin	1609	2020/2021 season (100%)	(162)				
22	UKR	Oleksandra Nazarova / Maksym Nikitin	1609	2019/2020 season (70%)	228			175	170
23	POL	Natalia Kaliszek / Maksym Spodyriev	1554	2021/2022 season (100%)	(222)	191			
23	POL	Natalia Kaliszek / Maksym Spodyriev	1554	2020/2021 season (100%)	377				
23	POL	Natalia Kaliszek / Maksym Spodyriev	1554	2019/2020 season (70%)	253	204	165	189	175
24	GER	Katharina Müller / Tim Dieck	1452	2021/2022 season (100%)	264	191		270	225
24	GER	Katharina Müller / Tim Dieck	1452	2020/2021 season (100%)	200				
24	GER	Katharina Müller / Tim Dieck	1452	2019/2020 season (70%)	(166)			175	127
25	USA	Oona Brown / Gage Brown	1319	2021/2022 season (100%)	500	250	225		
25	USA	Oona Brown / Gage Brown	1319	2020/2021 season (100%)					
25	USA	Oona Brown / Gage Brown	1319	2019/2020 season (70%)	136	115	93		
26	FIN	Juulia Turkkila / Matthias Versluis	1315	2021/2022 season (100%)	377	213		300	250
26	FIN	Juulia Turkkila / Matthias Versluis	1315	2020/2021 season (100%)					
26	FIN	Juulia Turkkila / Matthias Versluis	1315	2019/2020 season (70%)				175	
27	CAN	Natalie D'Alessandro / Bruce Waddell	1310	2021/2022 season (100%)	450	250	203		
27	CAN	Natalie D'Alessandro / Bruce Waddell	1310	2020/2021 season (100%)					
27	CAN	Natalie D'Alessandro / Bruce Waddell	1310	2019/2020 season (70%)	122	158	127		
28	RUS	Anastasia Skoptsova / Kirill Aleshin	1268	2021/2022 season (100%)		236		300	250
28	RUS	Anastasia Skoptsova / Kirill Aleshin	1268	2020/2021 season (100%)					
28	RUS	Anastasia Skoptsova / Kirill Aleshin	1268	2019/2020 season (70%)		149		175	158
28	USA	Katarina Wolfkostin / Jeffrey Chen	1268	2021/2022 season (100%)	365	250	225		
28	USA	Katarina Wolfkostin / Jeffrey Chen	1268	2020/2021 season (100%)					
28	USA	Katarina Wolfkostin / Jeffrey Chen	1268	2019/2020 season (70%)	186	127	115		
30	JPN	Kana Muramoto / Daisuke Takahashi	1262	2021/2022 season (100%)	756	236		270	
30	JPN	Kana Muramoto / Daisuke Takahashi	1262	2020/2021 season (100%)					
30	JPN	Kana Muramoto / Daisuke Takahashi	1262	2019/2020 season (70%)					

=== Current Season's World Ranking (top 30) ===
==== Men ====
As of April 16, 2022.

Rank	Nation	Skater	Points	Season	ISU Championships or Olympics	(Junior) Grand Prix and Final		Selected International Competition	
Rank	Nation	Skater	Points	Season	Best	Best	2nd Best	Best	2nd Best
1	USA	Vincent Zhou	2282	2021/2022	972	400	360	300	250
2	JPN	Yuma Kagiyama	2130	2021/2022	1080	400	400	250	
3	JPN	Shoma Uno	1960	2021/2022	1200	400	360		
4	USA	Nathan Chen	1924	2021/2022	1200	400	324		
5	GEO	Morisi Kvitelashvili	1898	2021/2022	875	400	236	243	144
6	ITA	Daniel Grassl	1863	2021/2022	756	324	213	300	270
7	USA	Jason Brown	1693	2021/2022	709	360	324	300	
8	LAT	Deniss Vasiljevs	1665	2021/2022	680	292	292	219	182
9	JPN	Kazuki Tomono	1566	2021/2022	756	324	236	250	
10	RUS	Mark Kondratiuk	1544	2021/2022	840	191		270	243
11	USA	Ilia Malinin	1510	2021/2022	517	250	250	250	243
12	CAN	Keegan Messing	1435	2021/2022	418	262	236	300	219
13	KOR	Cha Jun-hwan	1426	2021/2022	840	324	262		
14	ITA	Matteo Rizzo	1417	2021/2022	465	262	262	250	178
15	RUS	Andrei Mozalev	1338	2021/2022	612	213		270	243
16	RUS	Evgeni Semenenko	1332	2021/2022	574	324	236	198	
17	FRA	Adam Siao Him Fa	1305	2021/2022	574	191		270	270
18	USA	Camden Pulkinen	1182	2021/2022	787	213		182	
19	EST	Arlet Levandi	1092	2021/2022	214	225	225	250	178
20	USA	Jimmy Ma	1055	2021/2022	325	262		243	225
21	CAN	Wesley Chiu	1037	2021/2022	365	250	203	219	
22	EST	Mihhail Selevko	1035	2021/2022	295	148	148	225	219
23	JPN	Sena Miyake	997	2021/2022	612			225	160
24	RUS	Mikhail Kolyada	990	2021/2022		360	360	270	
25	CHN	Jin Boyang	933	2021/2022	517	213		203	
26	JPN	Sōta Yamamoto	929	2021/2022		213	213	300	203
27	ITA	Nikolaj Memola	880	2021/2022	266	182		250	182
28	JPN	Shun Sato	877	2021/2022		360	282	225	
29	JPN	Yuzuru Hanyu	875	2021/2022	875				
30	JPN	Kao Miura	871	2021/2022	680	191			

==== Women ====
As of April 17, 2022.

Rank	Nation	Skater	Points	Season	ISU Championships or Olympics	(Junior) Grand Prix and Final		Selected International Competition	
Rank	Nation	Skater	Points	Season	Best	Best	2nd Best	Best	2nd Best
1	RUS	Anna Shcherbakova	2225	2021/2022	1200	400	400	225	
2	USA	Alysa Liu	2126	2021/2022	972	292	262	300	300
3	JPN	Kaori Sakamoto	2117	2021/2022	1200	400	292	225	
4	RUS	Kamila Valieva	1975	2021/2022	875	400	400	300	
5	KOR	You Young	1930	2021/2022	797	324	324	270	225
6	BEL	Loena Hendrickx	1885	2021/2022	1080	324	262	219	
7	RUS	Alexandra Trusova	1730	2021/2022	1080	400		250	
8	JPN	Mai Mihara	1674	2021/2022	840	292	292	250	
9	JPN	Wakaba Higuchi	1647	2021/2022	787	324	236	300	
10	USA	Mariah Bell	1606	2021/2022	875	292	236	203	
11	USA	Lindsay Thorngren	1281	2021/2022	405	250	203	225	198
12	AZE	Ekaterina Ryabova	1250	2021/2022	517	213		270	250
13	RUS	Maiia Khromykh	1234	2021/2022		360	324	300	250
14	USA	Karen Chen	1233	2021/2022	574	262		219	178
15	EST	Niina Petrõkina	1230	2021/2022	402	182	133	270	243
16	JPN	Rino Matsuike	1228	2021/2022	551	236	191	250	
17	GEO	Anastasiia Gubanova	1207	2021/2022	709			300	198
18	KOR	Lee Hae-in	1194	2021/2022	756	213		225	
19	BLR	Viktoriia Safonova	1118	2021/2022	362	213		300	243
20	KOR	Kim Ye-lim	1107	2021/2022	680	236	191		
21	GER	Nicole Schott	1100	2021/2022	465	191		225	219
22	POL	Ekaterina Kurakova	1091	2021/2022	551			270	270
23	USA	Audrey Shin	1074	2021/2022	612			243	219
24	RUS	Elizaveta Tuktamysheva	990	2021/2022		360	360	270	
25	USA	Isabeau Levito	975	2021/2022	500	250	225		
26	CAN	Madeline Schizas	968	2021/2022	377	236	191	164	
27	RUS	Alena Kostornaia	927	2021/2022		360	324	243	
28	USA	Gabriella Izzo	824	2021/2022	402			219	203
29	KOR	Shin Ji-a	801	2021/2022	450	203	148		
30	SUI	Alexia Paganini	763	2021/2022	325			219	219

==== Pairs ====
As of April 15, 2022.

Rank	Nation	Skater	Points	Season	ISU Championships or Olympics	(Junior) Grand Prix and Final		Selected International Competition	
Rank	Nation	Skater	Points	Season	Best	Best	2nd Best	Best	2nd Best
1	RUS	Evgenia Tarasova / Vladimir Morozov	2410	2021/2022	1080	400	360	300	270
2	USA	Alexa Knierim / Brandon Frazier	2291	2021/2022	1200	324	292	250	225
3	RUS	Anastasia Mishina / Aleksandr Galliamov	2072	2021/2022	972	400	400	300	
4	JPN	Riku Miura / Ryuichi Kihara	2064	2021/2022	1080	360	324	300	
5	CAN	Vanessa James / Eric Radford	2045	2021/2022	972	292	292	270	219
6	CHN	Sui Wenjing / Han Cong	2000	2021/2022	1200	400	400		
7	USA	Audrey Lu / Misha Mitrofanov	1897	2021/2022	840	292	262	300	203
8	USA	Ashley Cain-Gribble / Timothy LeDuc	1676	2021/2022	574	324	292	243	243
9	RUS	Aleksandra Boikova / Dmitrii Kozlovskii	1599	2021/2022	875	400	324		
10	GER	Minerva Fabienne Hase / Nolan Seegert	1562	2021/2022	787	262	213	300	
11	GEO	Karina Safina / Luka Berulava	1546	2021/2022	875	225	203	243	
12	ITA	Rebecca Ghilardi / Filippo Ambrosini	1460	2021/2022	551	262	262	203	182
13	HUN	Ioulia Chtchetinina / Márk Magyar	1171	2021/2022	496	236	236	203	
14	CHN	Peng Cheng / Jin Yang	1147	2021/2022	787	360			
15	CAN	Evelyn Walsh / Trennt Michaud	1136	2021/2022	709	236	191		
16	ITA	Nicole Della Monica / Matteo Guarise	1094	2021/2022	339	292	213	250	
17	CAN	Kirsten Moore-Towers / Michael Marinaro	963	2021/2022	465	262	236		
18	USA	Emily Chan / Spencer Akira Howe	938	2021/2022	756			182	
19	RUS	Iuliia Artemeva / Mikhail Nazarychev	927	2021/2022		360	324	243	
20	ESP	Laura Barquero / Marco Zandron	913	2021/2022	418			270	225
21	RUS	Alina Pepeleva / Roman Pleshkov	855	2021/2022		236	236	219	164
22	CAN	Deanna Stellato-Dudek / Maxime Deschamps	831	2021/2022	612			219	
23	AUT	Miriam Ziegler / Severin Kiefer	829	2021/2022	638	191			
24	ITA	Sara Conti / Niccolò Macii	823	2021/2022	446	213		164	
25	FRA	Camille Kovalev / Pavel Kovalev	787	2021/2022	574	213			
26	AUS	Anastasia Golubeva / Hektor Giotopoulos Moore	778	2021/2022	450	164	164		
27	RUS	Yasmina Kadyrova / Ivan Balchenko	770	2021/2022		324		243	203
28	USA	Jessica Calalang / Brian Johnson	757	2021/2022		262		270	225
29	USA	Katie McBeath / Nathan Bartholomay	749	2021/2022	551			198	
30	NED	Daria Danilova / Michel Tsiba	742	2021/2022	517			225	

==== Ice dance ====
As of April 17, 2022.

Rank	Nation	Skater	Points	Season	ISU Championships or Olympics	(Junior) Grand Prix and Final		Selected International Competition	
Rank	Nation	Skater	Points	Season	Best	Best	2nd Best	Best	2nd Best
1	FRA	Gabriella Papadakis / Guillaume Cizeron	2300	2021/2022	1200	400	400	300	
2	ITA	Charlène Guignard / Marco Fabbri	2195	2021/2022	875	360	360	300	300
3	USA	Madison Hubbell / Zachary Donohue	2090	2021/2022	1080	400	360	250	
4	USA	Madison Chock / Evan Bates	1962	2021/2022	972	360	360	270	
5	USA	Caroline Green / Michael Parsons	1887	2021/2022	840	292	262	250	243
6	RUS	Victoria Sinitsina / Nikita Katsalapov	1880	2021/2022	1080	400	400		
7	CAN	Piper Gilles / Paul Poirier	1847	2021/2022	787	400	360	300	
8	ESP	Olivia Smart / Adrián Díaz	1767	2021/2022	638	324	292	270	243
9	GBR	Lilah Fear / Lewis Gibson	1739	2021/2022	709	324	213	250	243
10	CAN	Laurence Fournier Beaudry / Nikolaj Sørensen	1705	2021/2022	517	324	324	270	270
11	ESP	Sara Hurtado / Kirill Khaliavin	1521	2021/2022	496	292	292	243	198
12	RUS	Alexandra Stepanova / Ivan Bukin	1404	2021/2022	756	324	324		
13	LTU	Allison Reed / Saulius Ambrulevičius	1364	2021/2022	465	213	191	270	225
14	USA	Christina Carreira / Anthony Ponomarenko	1352	2021/2022	680	262	191	219	
15	JPN	Kana Muramoto / Daisuke Takahashi	1262	2021/2022	756	236		270	
16	CAN	Carolane Soucisse / Shane Firus	1236	2021/2022	612	213	213	198	
17	RUS	Diana Davis / Gleb Smolkin	1233	2021/2022	446	262		300	225
18	FIN	Juulia Turkkila / Matthias Versluis	1140	2021/2022	377	213		300	250
19	USA	Kaitlin Hawayek / Jean-Luc Baker	1136	2021/2022	574	262		300	
20	CAN	Marjorie Lajoie / Zachary Lagha	1135	2021/2022	418	262	236	219	
21	FRA	Evgeniia Lopareva / Geoffrey Brissaud	1115	2021/2022	362	292	236	225	
22	UKR	Oleksandra Nazarova / Maksym Nikitin	1036	2021/2022	325	191		270	250
23	USA	Oona Brown / Gage Brown	975	2021/2022	500	250	225		
24	GER	Katharina Müller / Tim Dieck	950	2021/2022	264	191		270	250
25	CAN	Natalie D'Alessandro / Bruce Waddell	903	2021/2022	450	250	203		
26	USA	Katarina Wolfkostin / Jeffrey Chen	840	2021/2022	365	250	225		
27	CAN	Nadiia Bashynska / Peter Beaumont	790	2021/2022	405	203	182		
28	AUS	Holly Harris / Jason Chan	787	2021/2022	402			203	182
29	RUS	Anastasia Skoptsova / Kirill Aleshin	786	2021/2022		236		300	250
30	ARM	Tina Garabedian / Simon Proulx-Sénécal	780	2021/2022	305			250	225
