= Figure skating at the 2020 Winter Youth Olympics =

Figure Skating at the III Winter Youth Olympic Games
- Venue: CIG de Malley
- Dates: 10–15 January
- Competitors: 71 from 19 nations

Figure skating at the 2020 Winter Youth Olympics took place at the Centre intercommunal de glace de Malley in Lausanne, Switzerland from 10 to 15 January 2020.

Unique to the Youth Olympic Games was a mixed NOC team trophy competition.

== Schedule ==
Date	Disc.	Time	Segment
Friday, 10 January	Pairs	13:30	Short program
Friday, 10 January	Men	16:00	Short program
Saturday, 11 January	Ice dance	13:30	Rhythm dance
Saturday, 11 January	Ladies	16:10	Short program
Sunday, 12 January	Pairs	11:30	Free skating
Sunday, 12 January	Men	14:00	Free skating
Monday, 13 January	Ice dance	11:00	Free dance
Monday, 13 January	Ladies	14:30	Free skating
Wednesday, 15 January	Team event	11:30	Free skating & free dance

- All times are listed in local time (UTC+1).

== Medal summary ==
=== Medal table ===
Rank	Nation	Gold	Silver	Bronze	Total
1	Russia	2	4	2	8
–	Mixed-NOCs	1	1	1	3
2	Japan	1	0	0	1
2	South Korea	1	0	0	1
4	Georgia	0	0	1	1
4	United States	0	0	1	1
Totals (5 entries)		5	5	5	15

=== Medalists ===
Discipline	Gold	Silver	Bronze
Boys' singles	Yuma Kagiyama; Japan	Andrei Mozalev; Russia	Daniil Samsonov; Russia
Girls' singles	You Young; South Korea	Ksenia Sinitsyna; Russia	Anna Frolova; Russia
Pairs	Apollinariia Panfilova / Dmitry Rylov; Russia	Diana Mukhametzianova / Ilya Mironov; Russia	Alina Butaeva / Luka Berulava; Georgia
Ice dance	Irina Khavronina / Dario Cirisano; Russia	Sofya Tyutyunina / Alexander Shustitskiy; Russia	Katarina Wolfkostin / Jeffrey Chen; United States
Mixed NOC team	Team Courage (Estonia) Arlet Levandi (Russia) Ksenia Sinitsyna (Georgia (country)) Alina Butaeva / Luka Berulava (Japan) Utana Yoshida / Shingo Nishiyama	Team Focus (Japan) Yuma Kagiyama (United States) Kate Wang (United States) Cate Fleming / Jedidah Isbell (Russia) Sofya Tyutyunina / Alexander Shustitskiy	Team Vision (Russia) Andrei Mozalev (Hungary) Regina Schermann (Ukraine) Sofiia Nesterova / Artem Darenskyi (Canada) Natalie D'Alessandro / Bruce Waddell

== Records ==
The following new junior ISU best scores were set during this competition:

Disc.	Segment	Skater(s)	Score	Date	Ref.
Pairs	Short program	(Russia) Apollinariia Panfilova / Dmitry Rylov	71.74	10 January 2020	
Pairs	Free skating	(Russia) Apollinariia Panfilova / Dmitry Rylov	127.47	12 January 2020	
Pairs	Combined total	(Russia) Apollinariia Panfilova / Dmitry Rylov	199.21	12 January 2020	

== Eligibility ==
Skaters were eligible to participate at the 2020 Winter Youth Olympics if they were born between 1 January 2003 and 31 December 2005, except males in pairs and ice dance, who may have been born between 1 January 2001 and 31 December 2004.

== Qualification system ==
The overall quota for the figure skating competition was 76 total skaters, consisting of 38 men and 38 ladies. There were 16 skaters in each of the single skating disciplines (men's and ladies'), 10 pair skating teams, and 12 ice dance teams. The maximum number of entries that a National Olympic Committee (NOC) could qualify was two per event, making 12 (six men and six ladies) the maximum number of entries that a country could qualify.

If a country hosted a skater in the first, second, or third position in a 2019 World Junior Figure Skating Championships discipline, they qualified for two spots in that discipline at the Winter Youth Olympics. All other nations could enter one athlete until a quota spot of twelve for each singles event, seven for pairs, and nine for ice dance were reached. There were an additional four spots for each single event and three spots for pairs and ice dance at the 2019–20 ISU Junior Grand Prix. Only one quota spot per discipline and NOC could be earned through the 2019–20 ISU Junior Grand Prix series, and only if a NOC did not already have a quota spot for that discipline.

== Number of entries per discipline ==
Based on the results of the 2019 World Junior Championships and the 2019–20 JGP Final, the following countries earned quota spots.

Event	Athletes per NOC	Boys' singles	Girls' singles	Pairs	Ice dance
2019 World Junior Championships	2	Italy; Russia; United States	Russia; United States	Russia	Canada; Russia
2019 World Junior Championships	1	Canada; Czech Republic; France; Japan	Azerbaijan; Canada; France; Georgia; Hungary; Italy; Japan; South Korea	China; Ukraine; United States	France; Georgia; Italy; Ukraine; United States
2019–20 JGP Final	1	China; Estonia; Israel; South Korea; Ukraine	Bulgaria; Estonia; Finland	Canada; Germany; Georgia	Czech Republic; Japan
Host nation	1	Switzerland	Switzerland		Switzerland
Total		16	16	8	12

=== Summary ===
Country	Boys' singles	Girls' singles	Pairs	Ice dance	Total
Azerbaijan	0	1	0	0	1
Bulgaria	0	1	0	0	1
Canada	1	1	1	2	8
China	1	0	1	0	3
Czech Republic	1	0	0	1	3
Estonia	1	1	0	0	2
Finland	0	1	0	0	1
France	1	1	0	1	4
Georgia	0	1	1	1	5
Germany	0	0	1	0	2
Hungary	0	1	0	0	1
Israel	1	0	0	0	1
Italy	2	1	0	1	5
Japan	1	1	0	1	4
Russia	2	2	2	2	12
Switzerland	1	1	0	1	4
South Korea	1	1	0	0	2
Ukraine	1	0	1	1	5
United States	1	2	1	1	7
Total: 19 NOCs	15	16	8	12	71

== Entries ==
Countries began announcing their selections in November 2019. The International Skating Union published a complete list of entries on January 6, 2020.

Country	Men	Ladies	Pairs	Ice dance
Azerbaijan		Ekaterina Ryabova		
Bulgaria		Ivelina Baycheva		
Canada	Aleksa Rakic	Catherine Carle	Brooke McIntosh / Brandon Toste	Natalie D'Alessandro / Bruce Waddell; Miku Makita / Tyler Gunara
China	Chen Yudong		Wang Yuchen / Huang Yihang	
Czech Republic	Daniel Mrázek			Denisa Cimlová / Vilém Hlavsa
Estonia	Arlet Levandi	Eva-Lotta Kiibus		
Finland		Nella Pelkonen		
France	François Pitot	Maïa Mazzara		Célina Fradji / Jean-Hans Fourneaux
Georgia		Alina Urushadze	Alina Butaeva / Luka Berulava	Yulia Lebedeva-Bitadze / Mikhail Kaygorodtsev
Germany			Letizia Roscher / Luis Schuster	
Hungary		Regina Schermann		
Israel	Nikita Kovalenko			
Italy	Nikolaj Memola; Matteo Nalbone	Alessia Tornaghi		Giulia Tuba / Andrea Tuba
Japan	Yuma Kagiyama	Mana Kawabe		Utana Yoshida / Shingo Nishiyama
Russia	Andrei Mozalev; Daniil Samsonov	Anna Frolova; Ksenia Sinitsyna	Diana Mukhametzianova / Ilya Mironov; Apollinariia Panfilova / Dmitry Rylov	Irina Khavronina / Dario Cirisano; Sofya Tyutyunina / Alexander Shustitsky
South Korea	Cha Young-hyun	You Young		
Switzerland	Noah Bodenstein	Anaïs Coraducci		Gina Zehnder / Beda-Leon Sieber
Ukraine	Andrey Kokura		Sofiia Nesterova / Artem Darenskyi	Anna Cherniavska / Oleg Muratov
United States	Liam Kapeikis	Audrey Shin; Kate Wang	Cate Fleming / Jedidiah Isbell	Katarina Wolfkostin / Jeffrey Chen

=== Changes to preliminary assignments ===
Discipline	Withdrew		Added		Notes	Ref.
Discipline	Date	Skater(s)	Date	Skater(s)	Notes	Ref.
Ladies	December 24, 2019	(Russia) Viktoria Vasilieva	December 24, 2019	(Russia) Anna Frolova	Joint problems	
Ladies	December 31, 2019	(United States) Hanna Harrell	January 1, 2020	(United States) Kate Wang		
Men	January 8, 2020	(United States) Ilia Malinin	—		Back injury	

== Results ==
=== Boys' singles ===
Rank	Skater	Nation	Total points	SP		FS	
1st place, gold medalist(s)	Yuma Kagiyama	Japan	239.17	3	72.76	1	166.41
2nd place, silver medalist(s)	Andrei Mozalev	Russia	237.94	1	79.72	2	158.22
3rd place, bronze medalist(s)	Daniil Samsonov	Russia	215.21	2	76.63	3	138.59
4	Aleksa Rakic	Canada	205.23	4	70.96	4	134.27
5	Cha Young-hyun	South Korea	199.12	5	69.61	5	129.51
6	Chen Yudong	China	184.60	10	57.31	6	127.29
7	Noah Bodenstein	Switzerland	176.92	9	60.56	7	116.36
8	Nikolaj Memola	Italy	176.55	7	62.18	8	114.37
9	Andrey Kokura	Ukraine	171.68	6	62.48	10	109.20
10	Liam Kapeikis	United States	161.59	14	49.57	9	112.02
11	Daniel Mrázek	Czech Republic	156.98	8	60.66	13	96.32
12	Arlet Levandi	Estonia	154.65	13	49.87	11	104.78
13	François Pitot	France	154.04	11	53.02	12	101.02
14	Matteo Nalbone	Italy	144.64	12	53.01	14	91.63
15	Nikita Kovalenko	Israel	132.12	15	44.71	15	87.41

=== Girls' singles ===
Rank	Skater	Nation	Total points	SP		FS	
1st place, gold medalist(s)	You Young	South Korea	214.00	1	73.51	1	140.49
2nd place, silver medalist(s)	Ksenia Sinitsyna	Russia	200.03	2	71.77	2	128.26
3rd place, bronze medalist(s)	Anna Frolova	Russia	187.72	3	69.07	4	118.65
4	Mana Kawabe	Japan	185.22	4	65.84	3	119.38
5	Alina Urushadze	Georgia	179.50	5	63.10	6	116.40
6	Alessia Tornaghi	Italy	178.60	6	62.19	5	116.41
7	Audrey Shin	United States	176.67	7	60.36	7	116.31
8	Ekaterina Ryabova	Azerbaijan	169.37	9	59.30	8	110.07
9	Maïa Mazzara	France	166.16	8	59.48	9	106.68
10	Anaïs Coraducci	Switzerland	150.89	13	48.03	10	102.86
11	Catherine Carle	Canada	143.42	12	49.57	11	93.85
12	Regina Schermann	Hungary	141.82	11	50.62	13	91.20
13	Kate Wang	United States	141.17	10	54.75	14	86.42
14	Eva-Lotta Kiibus	Estonia	138.70	14	46.63	12	92.07
15	Ivelina Baycheva	Bulgaria	128.83	16	43.90	15	84.93
16	Nella Pelkonen	Finland	118.42	15	45.13	16	73.29

=== Pairs ===
The results for Sofiia Nesterova and Artem Darenskyi were later disqualified.

Rank	Team	Nation	Total points	SP		FS	
1st place, gold medalist(s)	Apollinariia Panfilova / Dmitry Rylov	Russia	199.21	1	71.74	1	127.47
2nd place, silver medalist(s)	Diana Mukhametzianova / Ilya Mironov	Russia	175.42	2	60.45	2	114.97
3rd place, bronze medalist(s)	Alina Butaeva / Luka Berulava	Georgia	157.29	3	59.14	3	98.15
4	Brooke McIntosh / Brandon Toste	Canada	146.15	5	49.38	4	96.77
5	Wang Yuchen / Huang Yihang	China	141.61	6	46.96	5	94.65
6	Cate Fleming / Jedidiah Isbell	United States	137.97	4	49.87	6	88.10
7	Letizia Roscher / Luis Schuster	Germany	123.05	8	42.80	8	80.25

=== Ice dance ===
Rank	Team	Nation	Total points	RD		FD	
1st place, gold medalist(s)	Irina Khavronina / Dario Cirisano	Russia	164.63	1	63.52	1	101.11
2nd place, silver medalist(s)	Sofya Tyutyunina / Alexander Shustitskiy	Russia	159.15	2	62.64	2	96.51
3rd place, bronze medalist(s)	Katarina Wolfkostin / Jeffrey Chen	United States	152.43	5	57.02	3	95.41
4	Natalie D'Alessandro / Bruce Waddell	Canada	151.52	3	59.61	5	91.91
5	Miku Makita / Tyler Gunara	Canada	148.89	4	58.47	6	90.42
6	Utana Yoshida / Shingo Nishiyama	Japan	148.70	6	56.38	4	92.32
7	Anna Cherniavska / Oleg Muratov	Ukraine	131.61	7	52.24	8	79.37
8	Denisa Cimlová / Visém Hlavsa	Czech Republic	131.03	8	50.06	7	80.97
9	Giulia Tuba / Andrea Tuba	Italy	125.33	10	47.79	9	77.54
10	Célina Fradji / Jean-Hans Fourneaux	France	121.24	9	49.11	10	72.13
11	Yulia Lebedeva-Bitadze / Mikhail Kaygorodtsev	Georgia	115.65	11	47.20	11	68.45
12	Gina Zehnder / Beda Leon Sieber	Switzerland	96.95	12	36.10	12	60.85

== Mixed NOC team trophy ==
=== Teams ===
Team	Disc.	Skater(s)
Team Focus	Boys	(Japan) Yuma Kagiyama
Team Focus	Girls	(United States) Kate Wang
Team Focus	Pairs	(United States) Cate Fleming / Jedidiah Isbell
Team Focus	Ice dance	(Russia) Sofya Tyutyunina / Alexander Shustitskiy
Team Discovery	Boys	(Italy) Nikolaj Memola
Team Discovery	Girls	(Canada) Catherine Carle
Team Discovery	Pairs	(Russia) Apollinariia Panfilova / Dmitry Rylov
Team Discovery	Ice dance	(France) Célina Fradji / Jean-Hans Fourneaux
Team Courage	Boys	(Estonia) Arlet Levandi
Team Courage	Girls	(Russia) Ksenia Sinitsyna
Team Courage	Pairs	(Georgia (country)) Alina Butaeva / Luka Berulava
Team Courage	Ice dance	(Japan) Utana Yoshida / Shingo Nishiyama
Team Determination	Boys	(South Korea) Cha Young-hyun
Team Determination	Girls	(Finland) Nella Pelkonen
Team Determination	Pairs	(Canada) Brooke McIntosh / Brandon Toste
Team Determination	Ice dance	(United States) Katarina Wolfkostin / Jeffrey Chen
Team Motivation	Boys	(Ukraine) Andrey Kokura
Team Motivation	Girls	(Italy) Alessia Tornaghi
Team Motivation	Pairs	(Russia) Diana Mukhametzianova / Ilya Mironov
Team Motivation	Ice dance	(Switzerland) Gina Zehnder / Beda Leon Sieber
Team Future	Boys	(Italy) Matteo Nalbone
Team Future	Girls	(Russia) Anna Frolova
Team Future	Pairs	(China) Wang Yuchen / Huang Yihang
Team Future	Ice dance	(Ukraine) Anna Cherniavska / Oleg Muratov
Team Vision	Boys	(Russia) Andrei Mozalev
Team Vision	Girls	(Hungary) Regina Schermann
Team Vision	Pairs	(Ukraine) Sofiia Nesterova / Artem Darenskyi
Team Vision	Ice dance	(Canada) Natalie D'Alessandro / Bruce Waddell
Team Hope	Boys	(United States) Liam Kapeikis
Team Hope	Girls	(France) Maïa Mazzara
Team Hope	Pairs	(Germany) Letizia Roscher / Luis Schuster
Team Hope	Ice dance	(Canada) Miku Makita / Tyler Gunara

=== Team results ===
Rank	Team	Boys	Girls	Pairs	Ice dance	Total points
1st place, gold medalist(s)	Team Courage	2	8	6	8	24
2nd place, silver medalist(s)	Team Focus	8	4	3	7	22
3rd place, bronze medalist(s)	Team Vision	7	3	2	6	18
4	Team Determination	6	2	5	5	18
5	Team Motivation	3	6	7	1	17
6	Team Discovery	4	1	8	2	15
7	Team Future	1	7	4	3	15
8	Team Hope	5	5	1	4	15

=== Detailed results ===
==== Boys' singles ====
Rank	Skater	Nation	FS	Points	Team
1	Yuma Kagiyama	Japan	157.62	8	Team Focus
2	Andrei Mozalev	Russia	154.97	7	Team Vision
3	Cha Young-hyun	South Korea	133.13	6	Team Determination
4	Liam Kapeikis	United States	117.28	5	Team Hope
5	Nikolaj Memola	Italy	112.27	4	Team Discovery
6	Andrey Kokura	Ukraine	100.38	3	Team Motivation
7	Arlet Levandi	Estonia	97.63	2	Team Courage
8	Matteo Nalbone	Italy	73.89	1	Team Future

==== Girls' singles ====
Rank	Skater	Nation	FS	Points	Team
1	Ksenia Sinitsyna	Russia	127.63	8	Team Courage
2	Anna Frolova	Russia	126.00	7	Team Future
3	Alessia Tornaghi	Italy	125.22	6	Team Motivation
4	Maïa Mazzara	France	103.36	5	Team Hope
5	Kate Wang	United States	101.84	4	Team Focus
6	Regina Schermann	Hungary	95.37	3	Team Vision
7	Nella Pelkonen	Finland	91.27	2	Team Determination
8	Catherine Carle	Canada	91.22	1	Team Discovery

==== Pairs ====
Rank	Skaters	Nation	FS	Points	Team
1	Apollinariia Panfilova / Dmitry Rylov	Russia	126.49	8	Team Discovery
2	Diana Mukhametzianova / Ilya Mironov	Russia	101.89	7	Team Motivation
3	Alina Butaeva / Luka Berulava	Georgia	100.70	6	Team Courage
4	Brooke McIntosh / Brandon Toste	Canada	96.73	5	Team Determination
5	Wang Yuchen / Huang Yihang	China	91.35	4	Team Future
6	Cate Fleming / Jedidiah Isbell	United States	91.34	3	Team Focus
7	Sofiia Nesterova / Artem Darenskyi	Ukraine	86.53	2	Team Vision
8	Letizia Roscher / Luis Schuster	Germany	78.24	1	Team Hope

==== Ice dance ====
Rank	Skaters	Nation	FS	Points	Team
1	Utana Yoshida / Shingo Nishiyama	Japan	99.21	8	Team Courage
2	Sofya Tyutyunina / Alexander Shustitskiy	Russia	96.39	7	Team Focus
3	Natalie D'Alessandro / Bruce Waddell	Canada	95.73	6	Team Vision
4	Katarina Wolfkostin / Jeffrey Chen	United States	90.41	5	Team Determination
5	Miku Makita / Tyler Gunara	Canada	89.87	4	Team Hope
6	Anna Cherniavska / Oleg Muratov	Ukraine	80.86	3	Team Future
7	Célina Fradji / Jean-Hans Fourneaux	France	75.86	2	Team Discovery
8	Gina Zehnder / Beda Leon Sieber	Switzerland	60.87	1	Team Motivation
