= Georgia at the 2020 Winter Youth Olympics =

- Flag of Georgia
- IOC code: GEO
- NOC: Georgian National Olympic Committee
- Website: www.geonoc.org.ge

in Lausanne
- Competitors: 10 in 4 sports
- Medals: Gold 0 Silver 0 Bronze 1 Total 1

Winter Youth Olympics appearances
- 2012; 2016; 2020; 2024

Georgia competed at the 2020 Winter Youth Olympics in Lausanne, Switzerland from 9 to 22 January 2020.

== Medalists ==
Medals awarded to participants of mixed-NOC teams are represented in italics. These medals are not counted towards the individual NOC medal tally.

Medal	Name	Sport	Event	Date
Gold	Alina Butaeva; Luka Berulava	Figure skating	Team trophy	15 January
Bronze	Alina Butaeva; Luka Berulava	Figure skating	Pair skating	12 January

== Alpine skiing ==
Boys

Athlete	Event	Run 1		Run 2		Total	
Athlete	Event	Time	Rank	Time	Rank	Time	Rank
Nodar Kozanashvili	Giant slalom	DNF					
Nodar Kozanashvili	Slalom	DNF					

Girls

Athlete	Event	Run 1		Run 2		Total	
Athlete	Event	Time	Rank	Time	Rank	Time	Rank
Nino Kurtanidze	Giant slalom	1:27.78	52	DNS			
Nino Kurtanidze	Slalom	DNF					

== Figure skating ==
four Georgian figure skaters achieved quota places for Georgia based on the results of the 2019 World Junior Figure Skating Championships.

Singles

Athlete	Event	SP		FS		Total	
Athlete	Event	Points	Rank	Points	Rank	Points	Rank
Alina Urushadze	Girls' singles	63.10	5	116.40	6	179.50	5

Couples

Athletes	Event	SP/SD		FS/FD		Total	
Athletes	Event	Points	Rank	Points	Rank	Points	Rank
Yulia Lebedeva-Bitadze; Mikhail Kaygorodtsev	Ice dancing	47.20	11	68.45	11	115.65	15
Alina Butaeva; Luka Berulava	Pairs	59.14	3	98.15	3	157.29	3rd place, bronze medalist(s)

Mixed NOC team trophy

Athletes	Event	Free skate/Free dance					
Athletes	Event	Ice dance	Pairs	Girls	Boys	Total	
Athletes	Event	Points Team points	Points Team points	Points Team points	Points Team points	Points	Rank
Team Courage; Utana Yoshida / Shingo Nishiyama (JPN); Alina Butaeva / Luka Berulava (GEO); Ksenia Sinitsyna (RUS); Arlet Levandi (EST)	Team trophy	99.21; 8	100.70; 6	127.63; 8	97.63; 2	24	1st place, gold medalist(s)

== Luge ==
Boys

Athlete	Event	Run 1		Run 2		Total	
Athlete	Event	Time	Rank	Time	Rank	Time	Rank
Lasha Mtchedliani	Singles	55.365	14	55.126	11	1:50.491	11
Luka Mtchedliani	Singles	56.119	20	56.343	19	1:52.462	20

== Ski jumping ==
Girls

Athlete	Event	First round			Final			Total	
Athlete	Event	Distance	Points	Rank	Distance	Points	Rank	Points	Rank
Esmeralda Gobozova	Normal hill	58.0	60.0	31	53.0	38.3	31	98.3	31

== See also ==
- Georgia at the 2020 Summer Olympics
