= Wang Yuchen =

Wang Yuchen may refer to:

- Wang Yuchen (figure skater) (王瑀晨; born 2005), Chinese pair skater
- Wang Yuchen (snooker player) (王雨晨; born 1997), Chinese and Hong Kong snooker player
