= Figure skating at the 2020 Winter Youth Olympics – Team trophy =

Team Mixed NOC at the III Winter Youth Olympic Games
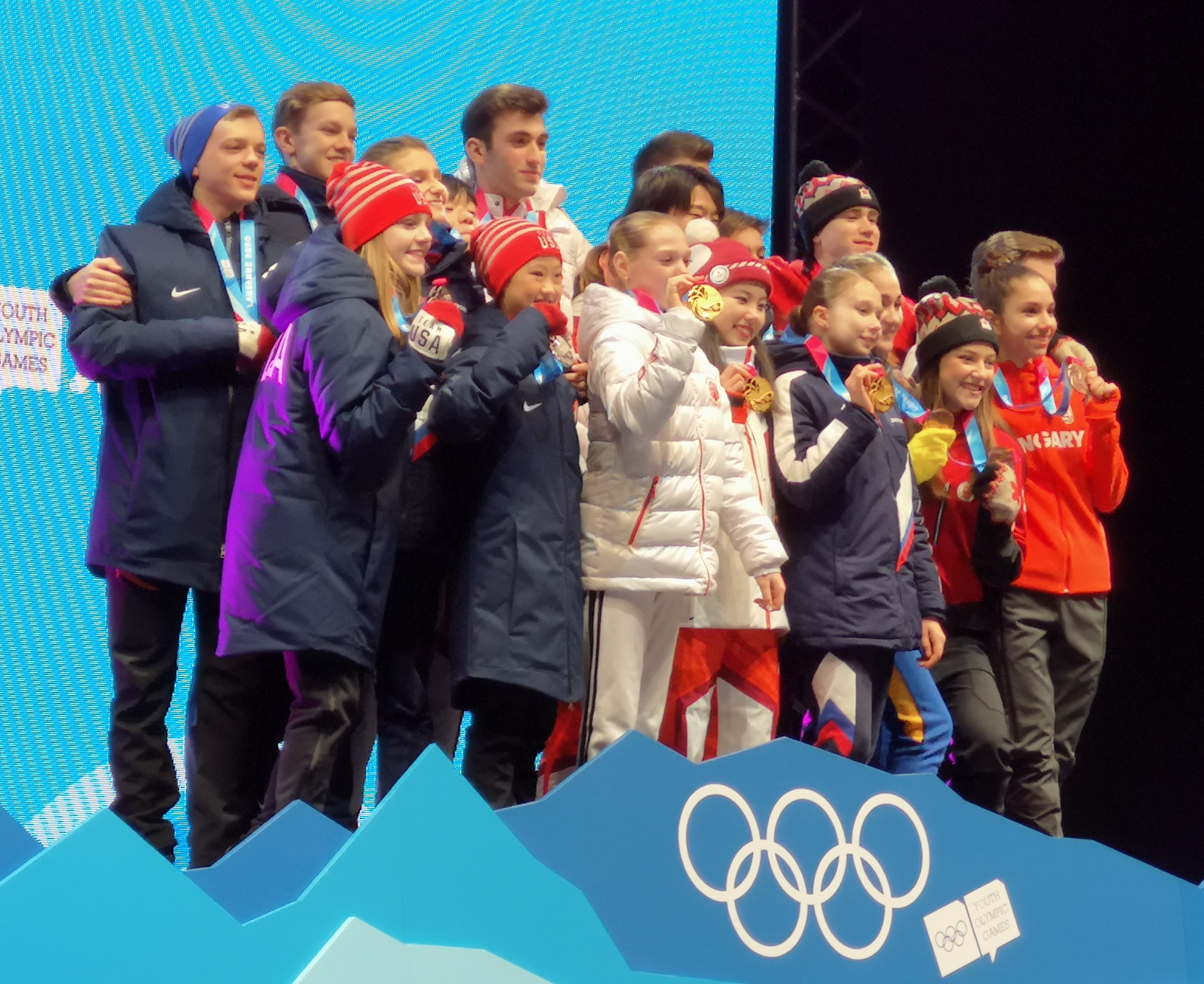
- Venue: Lausanne Skating Arena
- Dates: 15 January
- Competitors: 48 from 15 nations

Medalists
1st place, gold medalist(s)		Arlet Levandi; Ksenia Sinitsyna; Alina Butaeva / Luka Berulava; Utana Yoshida / Shingo Nishiyama	Mixed-NOCs
2nd place, silver medalist(s)		Yuma Kagiyama; Kate Wang; Cate Fleming / Jedidah Isbell; Sofya Tyutyunina / Alexander Shustitskiy	Mixed-NOCs
3rd place, bronze medalist(s)		Andrei Mozalev; Regina Schermann; Sofiia Nesterova / Artem Darenskyi; Natalie D'Alessandro / Bruce Waddell	Mixed-NOCs

The mixed NOC team figure skating competition of the 2020 Winter Youth Olympics was held at the Lausanne Skating Arena on 15 January 2020. The eight teams were composed of one men's single skater, one ladies' single skater, one pair, and one ice dancing duo, each performing a free program or free dance.

== Teams ==
The skaters who took part the team trophy was determined by draw.

Team	Men	Ladies	Pairs	Ice dancing
Team Focus	Yuma Kagiyama (JPN)	Kate Wang (USA)	Cate Fleming / Jedidah Isbell (USA)	Sofya Tyutyunina / Alexander Shustitskiy (RUS)
Team Discovery	Nikolaj Memola (ITA)	Catherine Carle (CAN)	Apollinariia Panfilova / Dmitry Rylov (RUS)	Célina Fradji / Jean-Hans Fourneaux (FRA)
Team Courage	Arlet Levandi (EST)	Ksenia Sinitsyna (RUS)	Alina Butaeva / Luka Berulava (GEO)	Utana Yoshida / Shingo Nishiyama (JPN)
Team Determination	Cha Young-hyun (KOR)	Nella Pelkonen (FIN)	Brooke McIntosh / Brandon Toste (CAN)	Katarina Wolfkostin / Jeffrey Chen (USA)
Team Motivation	Andrey Kokura (UKR)	Alessia Tornaghi (ITA)	Diana Mukhametzianova / Ilya Mironov (RUS)	Gina Zehnder / Beda-Leon Sieber (SUI)
Team Future	Matteo Nalbone (ITA)	Anna Frolova (RUS)	Wang Yuchen / Huang Yihang (CHN)	Anna Cherniavska / Oleg Muratov (UKR)
Team Vision	Andrei Mozalev (RUS)	Regina Schermann (HUN)	Sofiia Nesterova / Artem Darenskyi (UKR)	Natalie D'Alessandro / Bruce Waddell (CAN)
Team Hope	Liam Kapeikis (USA)	Maïa Mazzara (FRA)	Letizia Roscher / Luis Schuster (GER)	Miku Makita / Tyler Gunara (CAN)

== Results ==
In the case of a winner of the competition, the tie breaking procedure was used, taking into consideration the two best places of the concerned teams in different categories. The highest total points from the two best places prevailed and the respective placings was recorded accordingly. In the case of a 4th place the ties persisted. In this case the three best places in different categories was considered and the highest total scores from the three best places prevailed and the respective placings was recorded accordingly.

Pl.	Name	Men	Ladies	Ice dance	Pairs	Total points
1st place, gold medalist(s)	Team Courage	2	8	8	6	24
2nd place, silver medalist(s)	Team Focus	8	4	7	3	22
3rd place, bronze medalist(s)	Team Vision	7	3	6	2	18
4	Team Determination	6	2	5	5	18
5	Team Motivation	3	6	1	7	17
6	Team Discovery	4	1	2	8	15
7	Team Future	1	7	3	4	15
8	Team Hope	5	5	4	1	15

== Detailed results ==
=== Ice dancing ===
Rank	Name	Team	TSS	TES	PCS	SS	TR	PE	CH	IN	Ded	StN	Points
1	Utana Yoshida / Shingo Nishiyama (JPN)	Team Courage	99.31	54.70	44.51	6.96	7.14	7.46	7.64	7.89	0.00	4	8
2	Sofya Tyutyunina / Alexander Shustitskiy (RUS)	Team Focus	96.39	51.26	45.13	7.54	7.25	7.64	7.61	7.57	0.00	8	7
3	Natalie D'Alessandro / Bruce Waddell (CAN)	Team Vision	95.73	51.14	44.59	7.29	7.14	7.54	7.54	7.64	0.00	6	6
4	Katarina Wolfkostin / Jeffrey Chen (USA)	Team Determination	90.41	47.91	43.50	7.18	7.11	7.07	7.50	7.39	1.00	7	5
5	Miku Makita / Tyler Gunara (CAN)	Team Hope	89.87	46.74	43.13	7.11	6.93	7.29	7.25	7.36	0.00	5	4
6	Anna Cherniavska / Oleg Muratov (UKR)	Team Future	80.86	43.81	37.05	6.14	5.96	6.25	6.21	6.32	0.00	3	3
7	Célina Fradji / Jean-Hans Fourneaux (FRA)	Team Discovery	75.86	41.02	34.84	5.75	5.50	5.96	5.93	5.89	0.00	2	2
8	Gina Zehnder / Beda-Leon Sieber (SUI)	Team Motivation	60.87	36.37	25.50	4.32	4.04	4.18	4.50	4.21	1.00	1	1

=== Pairs ===
Rank	Name	Team	TSS	TES	PCS	SS	TR	PE	CH	IN	Ded	StN	Points
1	Apollinariia Panfilova / Dmitry Rylov (RUS)	Team Discovery	126.49	61.24	65.25	8.18	7.96	8.14	8.25	8.25	0.00	8	8
2	Diana Mukhametzianova / Ilya Mironov (RUS)	Team Motivation	101.89	46.39	57.50	7.46	7.11	6.86	7.36	7.14	2.00	7	7
3	Alina Butaeva / Luka Berulava (GEO)	Team Courage	100.70	47.27	53.43	6.79	6.43	6.54	6.82	6.82	0.00	6	6
4	Brooke McIntosh / Brandon Toste (CAN)	Team Determination	96.73	48.21	48.52	6.07	6.00	6.11	6.18	5.96	0.00	5	5
5	Wang Yuchen / Huang Yihang (CHN)	Team Future	91.35	44.40	48.95	6.39	6.00	5.89	6.32	6.00	2.00	4	4
6	Cate Fleming / Jedidah Isbell (USA)	Team Focus	91.34	44.07	47.27	5.89	5.68	5.93	6.18	5.86	0.00	3	3
7	Sofiia Nesterova / Artem Darenskyi (UKR)	Team Vision	86.53	41.40	45.13	5.68	5.50	5.64	5.75	5.64	0.00	2	2
8	Letizia Roscher / Luis Schuster (GER)	Team Hope	78.28	37.57	41.67	5.25	5.11	5.11	5.32	5.25	1.00	1	1

=== Ladies ===
Rank	Name	Team	TSS	TES	PCS	SS	TR	PE	CH	IN	Ded	StN	Points
1	Ksenia Sinitsyna (RUS)	Team Courage	127.63	63.25	65.38	8.18	8.07	8.04	8.36	8.21	1.00	8	8
2	Anna Frolova (RUS)	Team Future	126.00	65.92	61.08	7.71	7.57	7.50	7.71	7.68	1.00	7	7
3	Alessia Tornaghi (ITA)	Team Motivation	125.22	66.81	58.41	7.21	6.93	7.50	7.43	7.43	0.00	6	6
4	Maïa Mazzara (FRA)	Team Hope	103.36	52.65	51.71	6.64	6.39	6.25	6.61	6.43	1.00	5	5
5	Kate Wang (USA)	Team Focus	101.84	53.81	48.03	6.14	5.82	6.04	6.14	5.89	0.00	2	4
6	Regina Schermann (HUN)	Team Vision	95.37	49.05	48.32	6.14	5.89	5.89	6.29	6.00	2.00	3	3
7	Nella Pelkonen (FIN)	Team Determination	91.27	46.37	44.90	5.71	5.50	5.71	5.64	5.50	0.00	1	2
8	Catherine Carle (CAN)	Team Discovery	91.22	43.93	48.29	6.32	5.86	5.89	6.11	6.00	1.00	4	1

=== Men ===
Rank	Name	Team	TSS	TES	PCS	SS	TR	PE	CH	IN	Ded	StN	Points
1	Yuma Kagiyama (JPN)	Team Focus	157.62	82.70	77.92	8.14	7.57	7.68	7.89	7.68	3.00	8	8
2	Andrei Mozalev (RUS)	Team Vision	154.97	79.55	75.42	7.57	7.50	7.57	7.61	7.46	0.00	7	7
3	Cha Young-hyun (KOR)	Team Determination	133.13	64.55	68.58	6.93	6.54	6.96	6.86	7.00	0.00	6	6
4	Liam Kapeikis (USA)	Team Hope	117.28	57.28	61.00	6.07	5.86	6.14	6.29	6.14	1.00	3	5
5	Nikolaj Memola (ITA)	Team Discovery	112.27	54.55	57.72	5.82	5.50	5.79	6.00	5.75	0.00	5	4
6	Andrey Kokura (UKR)	Team Motivation	100.38	45.46	54.92	5.82	5.07	5.46	5.54	5.57	0.00	4	3
7	Arlet Levandi (EST)	Team Courage	97.63	45.89	53.74	5.43	5.11	5.25	5.54	5.54	2.00	2	2
8	Matteo Nalbone (ITA)	Team Future	73.89	29.73	45.16	4.82	4.29	4.29	4.75	4.43	1.00	1	1
