= Figure skating at the 2020 Winter Youth Olympics – Pair skating =

Pair skating at the III Winter Youth Olympic Games
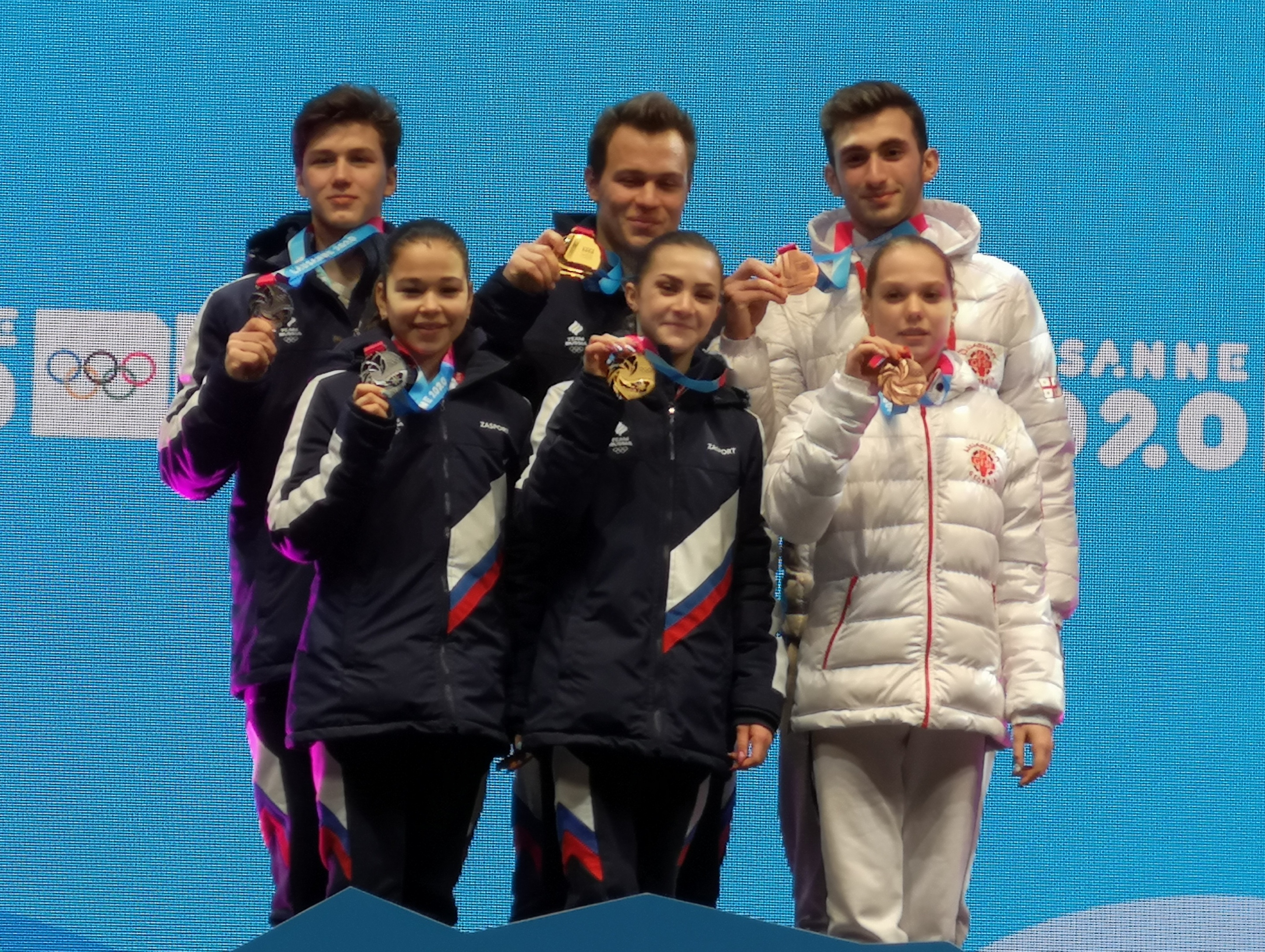
- Venue: Lausanne Skating Arena
- Dates: 10, 12 January
- Competitors: 16 from 7 nations
- Winning score: 199.21

Medalists
| 1st place, gold medalist(s) | | Apollinariia Panfilova; Dmitry Rylov | Russia |
| 2nd place, silver medalist(s) | | Diana Mukhametzianova; Ilya Mironov | Russia |
| 3rd place, bronze medalist(s) | | Alina Butaeva; Luka Berulava | Georgia |

The pair skating competition of the 2020 Winter Youth Olympics was held at the Lausanne Skating Arena on 10 January (short program) and 12 January 2020 (free skating).

== Results ==
=== Short program ===
The short program was held on 10 January at 13:30.

| Pl. | Name | Nation | TSS | TES | PCS | SS | TR | PE | CH | IN | Ded | StN |
|---|---|---|---|---|---|---|---|---|---|---|---|---|
| 1 | Apollinariia Panfilova / Dmitry Rylov | Russia | 71.74 | 41.99 | 29.75 | 7.57 | 7.21 | 7.57 | 7.46 | 7.36 | 0.00 | 5 |
| 2 | Diana Mukhametzianova / Ilya Mironov | Russia | 60.45 | 33.38 | 28.07 | 7.07 | 6.82 | 6.96 | 7.11 | 7.11 | -1.00 | 8 |
| 3 | Alina Butaeva / Luka Berulava | Georgia | 59.14 | 34.60 | 24.54 | 6.25 | 5.79 | 6.25 | 6.25 | 6.14 | 0.00 | 4 |
| 4 | Cate Fleming / Jedidah Isbell | United States | 49.87 | 28.06 | 21.80 | 5.46 | 5.21 | 5.57 | 5.54 | 5.46 | 0.00 | 2 |
| 5 | Brooke McIntosh / Brandon Toste | Canada | 49.38 | 28.78 | 21.60 | 5.50 | 5.32 | 5.29 | 5.50 | 5.39 | -1.00 | 7 |
| 6 | Wang Yuchen / Huang Yihang | China | 46.96 | 25.96 | 22.00 | 5.79 | 5.29 | 5.43 | 5.57 | 5.43 | -1.00 | 3 |
| 7 | Sofiia Nesterova / Artem Darenskyi | Ukraine | 45.82 | 24.76 | 21.06 | 5.36 | 5.18 | 5.14 | 5.32 | 5.32 | 0.00 | 6 |
| 8 | Letizia Roscher / Luis Schuster | Germany | 42.80 | 23.23 | 19.57 | 5.00 | 4.75 | 4.89 | 5.00 | 4.82 | 0.00 | 1 |

=== Free skating ===
The free skating was held on 12 January at 11:30.

| Pl. | Name | Nation | TSS | TES | PCS | SS | TR | PE | CH | IN | Ded | StN |
|---|---|---|---|---|---|---|---|---|---|---|---|---|
| 1 | Apollinariia Panfilova / Dmitry Rylov | Russia | 127.47 | 62.43 | 65.04 | 8.21 | 7.93 | 8.21 | 8.18 | 8.11 | 0.00 | 8 |
| 2 | Diana Mukhametzianova / Ilya Mironov | Russia | 114.97 | 58.26 | 57.71 | 7.36 | 7.04 | 7.21 | 7.32 | 7.14 | 1.00 | 7 |
| 3 | Alina Butaeva / Luka Berulava | Georgia | 98.15 | 47.73 | 51.42 | 6.61 | 6.25 | 6.32 | 6.57 | 6.57 | 1.00 | 5 |
| 4 | Brooke McIntosh / Brandon Toste | Canada | 96.77 | 48.62 | 48.15 | 6.07 | 5.89 | 6.07 | 6.07 | 6.00 | 0.00 | 3 |
| 5 | Wang Yuchen / Huang Yihang | China | 94.65 | 46.20 | 49.45 | 6.36 | 5.96 | 6.11 | 6.29 | 6.18 | 1.00 | 4 |
| 6 | Cate Fleming / Jedidah Isbell | United States | 88.10 | 41.12 | 48.98 | 6.21 | 6.04 | 5.86 | 6.36 | 6.14 | 2.00 | 6 |
| 7 | Sofiia Nesterova / Artem Darenskyi | Ukraine | 82.65 | 40.26 | 42.39 | 5.57 | 5.57 | 5.29 | 5.36 | 5.57 | 0.00 | 1 |
| 8 | Letizia Roscher / Luis Schuster | Germany | 80.25 | 39.49 | 41.76 | 5.32 | 5.11 | 5.21 | 5.32 | 5.14 | 1.00 | 2 |

=== Overall ===
| Rank | Name | Nation | Total points | SP | | FS | |
|---|---|---|---|---|---|---|---|
| 1 | Apollinariia Panfilova / Dmitry Rylov | Russia | 199.21 | 1 | 71.74 | 1 | 127.47 |
| 2 | Diana Mukhametzianova / Ilya Mironov | Russia | 175.42 | 2 | 60.45 | 2 | 114.97 |
| 3 | Alina Butaeva / Luka Berulava | Georgia | 157.29 | 3 | 59.14 | 3 | 98.15 |
| 4 | Brooke McIntosh / Brandon Toste | Canada | 146.15 | 5 | 49.38 | 4 | 96.77 |
| 5 | Wang Yuchen / Huang Yihang | China | 141.61 | 6 | 46.96 | 5 | 94.65 |
| 6 | Cate Fleming / Jedidah Isbell | United States | 137.97 | 4 | 49.87 | 6 | 88.10 |
| 7 | Sofiia Nesterova / Artem Darenskyi | Ukraine | 128.47 | 7 | 45.82 | 7 | 82.65 |
| 8 | Letizia Roscher / Luis Schuster | Germany | 123.05 | 8 | 42.80 | 8 | 80.25 |
