= Huang Yihang =

Chinese pair skater (born 2002)

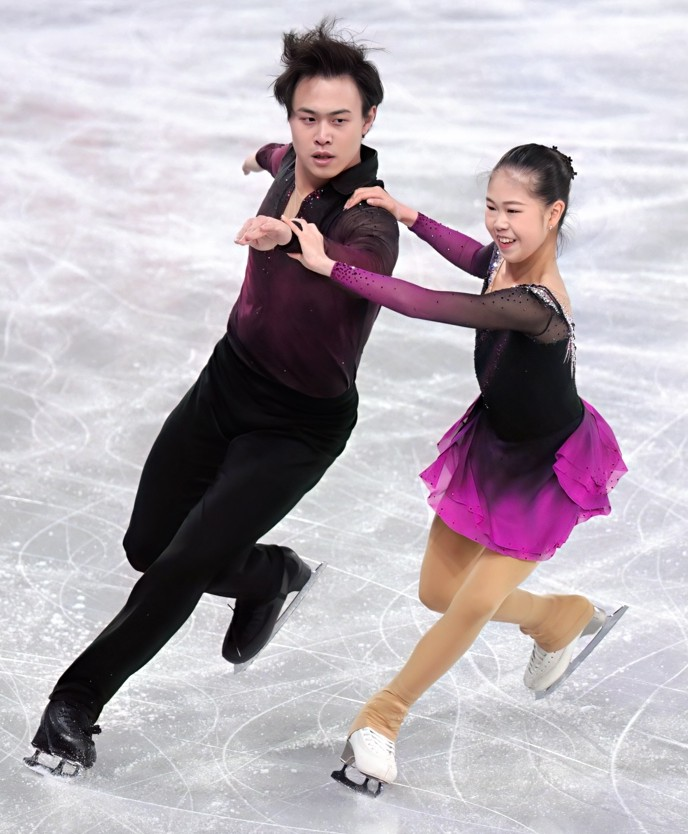
- Zhang Jiaxuan and Yihang Huang at the 2024–25 Junior Grand Prix Final

Personal information
- Native name: 黄一航 (Chinese)
- Born: May 30, 2002 (age 24) Qiqihar, China
- Height: 1.81 m (5 ft 11 1/2 in)

Figure skating career
- Country: China
- Partner: Zhang Jiaxuan (since 2022); Wang Yuchen (2017–2022)
- Coach: Ding Yang; Du Jiayuan
- Skating club: Heilongjiang Heilong Ice and Snow Sports Club
- Began skating: 2010

Medal record
Chinese Championships
Gold medal – first place	2024 Chengde	Pairs
Silver medal – second place	2023 Chengde	Pairs
Bronze medal – third place	2022 Chengde	Pairs
Bronze medal – third place	2025 Harbin	Pairs
Junior Grand Prix Final
Gold medal – first place	2024–25 Grenoble	Pairs

Huang Yihang (simplified Chinese: 黄一航; traditional Chinese: 黃一航; pinyin: Huáng Yīháng; born May 30, 2002) is a Chinese pair skater. With his skating partner Zhang Jiaxuan, he is the 2024 Chinese national champion and the 2026 CS Nebelhorn Trophy bronze medalist. On the junior level, he is the 2024–25 Junior Grand Prix Final champion and a two-time ISU Junior Grand Prix gold medalist.

With former skating partner, Wang Yuchen, he is the 2020 Cup of China silver medalist, the 2020 Chinese junior national champion, and placed in the top eight at the 2020 World Junior Championships.

== Personal life ==
Huang was born on May 30, 2002, in Qiqihar, Heilongjiang, China.

He looks up to Olympic champion pair team, Sui/Han.

== Career ==
=== Partnership with Wang ===
Huang started skating in 2010.

He teamed up with Wang Yuchen prior to the 2017–18 season to pursue pair skating. They were initially coached by Luan Bo. Debuting at the 2018 Chinese Championships, the pair finished eighth. They would begin training under Zhao Hongbo, Guan Jinlin, and Zhang Tianci in Beijing after the season ended.

==== 2018–2019 season ====
Wang/Huang were added to the Chinese national team ahead of the season to replace an injured Yu Xiaoyu / Zhang Hao. They made their junior international debut on the Junior Grand Prix, placing eighth in Canada and 13th in the Czech Republic. In early December, Wang/Huang competed at the Russian-Chinese Winter Youth Games, where they finished fourth. They ended their season at the 2019 Chinese Championships, finishing fifth.

==== 2019–2020 season ====
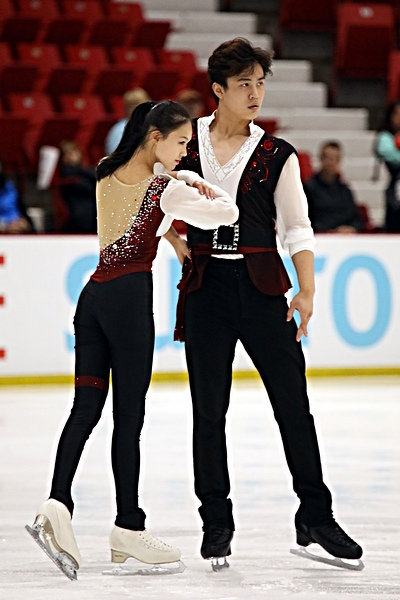
Wang/Huang at the 2019 JGP United States

Wang/Huang opened their season on the Junior Grand Prix and finished eighth at both their events in the United States and Croatia. In between the two JGP events, they competed at the 2020 Chinese Championships, where they won the junior title by 0.01 points ahead of Wang Huidi / Jia Ziqi and Li Jiaen / Wang Zijian.

Wang/Huang were assigned to compete at the 2020 Winter Youth Olympics in Lausanne, Switzerland in January. On being selected, Wang said: "I am very excited to participate in such a large competition for the first time. In order to achieve our competition goal, I will train hard and strive to skate in my best form and win glory for the country." Wang/Huang went on to place fifth in the individual event. Huang expressed dissatisfaction with their performance and called it a "learning opportunity." As part of Team Future during the team event, they again placed fifth to help the team finish seventh overall.

Wang/Huang finished their season at the 2020 World Junior Championships in March. Placing eighth in the short program and sixth in the free skating, they ended in eighth place overall.

==== 2020–2021 season ====
Due to the COVID-19 pandemic, the Junior Grand Prix series was cancelled and the Grand Prix events were limited to domestic competitors or skaters who trained in the host nation's immediate geographic region. As a result, Wang/Huang were assigned to make their senior debut at the 2020 Cup of China. They finished second in both segments to earn the silver medal behind Peng Cheng / Jin Yang.

In January 2021, Wang/Huang participated in the New Year's Day Ice Carnival, a domestic team competition held among the Chinese national team, as part of Sui Wenjing's Team Elite alongside Jin Boyang, Chen Hongyi, Wang Yihan, and Chen Hong / Sun Zhuoming. They lost the competition to Han Cong's Team Sharp Blades after falling behind on the first day of competition.

==== 2021–2022 season ====
Wang/Huang were assigned to compete at the 2021 CS Nebelhorn Trophy to attempt to qualify a third berth for Chinese pairs at the 2022 Winter Olympics. They placed fourth in the short program, third among the teams seeking the three available spots, but dropped to sixth place after three falls in their free skate, and did not qualify a place.

They went on to win the bronze medal at the 2021 CS Asian Open Trophy. The pair parted ways following the season.

=== Partnership with Zhang ===
==== 2022–2023 and 2023–2024 seasons ====
For the 2022–23 figure skating season, Huang teamed up with Zhang Jiaxuan. Upon getting together, the pair began training in Beijing with Ding Yang as their coach.

In their first appearance together at the Chinese Championships, Huang/Zhang won the bronze medal. The following year, they won the silver medal at the 2023 Chinese Championships.

==== 2024–2025 season: Junior international debut and JGP Final gold ====
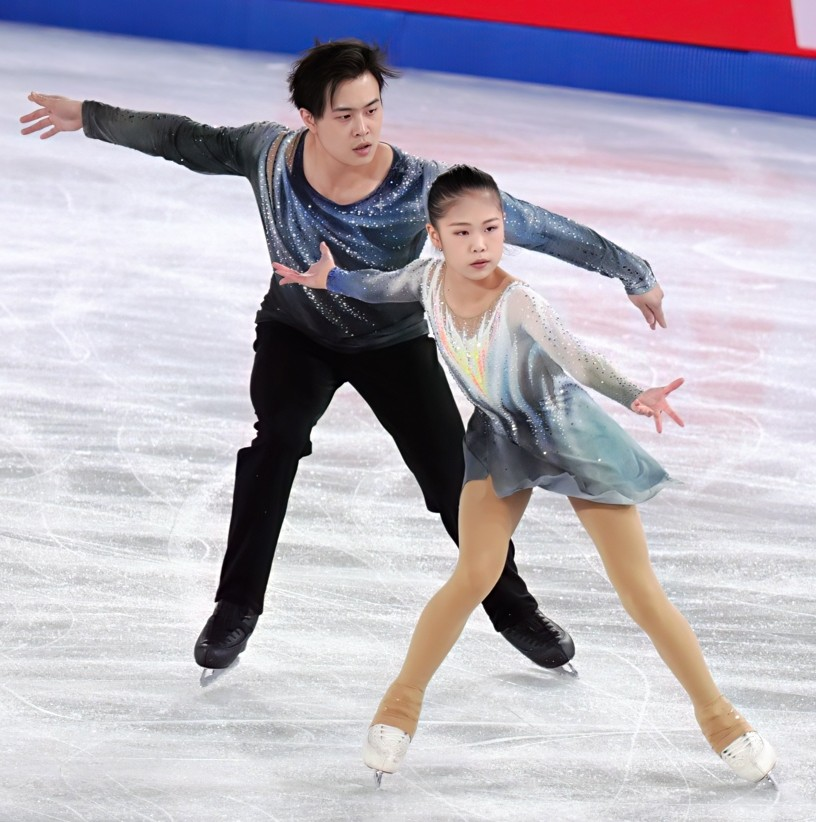
Zhang/Huang during the free skate at the 2024–25 Junior Grand Prix Final

On the 2024–25 ISU Junior Grand Prix circuit, Zhang/Huang made their international debut. The pair won gold both their assigned events, 2024 JGP Latvia and 2024 JGP Poland. With these results, the pair qualified for the 2024–25 Junior Grand Prix Final in Grenoble, France as the highest ranking junior pair team.

In late November, Zhang/Huang won gold at the 2024 Chinese Championships. The following week, they would win the Junior Grand Prix Final by over twenty points. Regarding this win, Zhang said, "It is a great honour for us to be here at the Junior Grand Prix Final. We hope to improve to be able to do even better in the future. Our goal is not only to improve on our technical but also on our artistry."

They concluded the season with a fifth-place finish at the 2025 World Junior Championships in Debrecen, Hungary. “We will be skating in seniors,” said Zhang regarding next season. “We think we have to make our technical elements stronger and more difficult so that we can compete with the seniors.”

==== 2025–2026 season: Senior international debut ====
Making their senior international debut as a pair, Zhang and Huang opened the season by winning the gold medal at the 2025 Asian Open Trophy. They were subsequently selected to compete at the ISU Skate to Milano, the final qualifying event for the 2026 Winter Olympics, where they won the gold medal and thus secured an Olympic berth for Chinese pair skating.

In late October, Zhang and Huang made their senior Grand Prix debut at the 2025 Cup of China, where they finished in fourth place. "I feel still feel a bit nervous because it is my first senior Grand Prix event," Zhang confessed after the free skate. "We've made a few mistakes, like small mistakes in the program. This is okay, but it's not our best level, and we want to keep working on the program to do better next time." A couple weeks later, they finished sixth at the 2025 Finlandia Trophy.

In December, Zhang and Huang won the bronze medal at the 2026 Chinese Championships behind Sui/Han and Guo/Zhang. The following month, Zhang and Huang placed fourth at the 2026 Four Continents Championships in their debut at this event. "Coming from the provincial championships, I feel that our speed might be much worse than of other senior athletes," said Huang after the free skate. "We gradually improved our speed and the quality of the program, including some content, elements and performance aspects."

== Programs ==
=== Pair skating with Zhang Jiaxuan ===
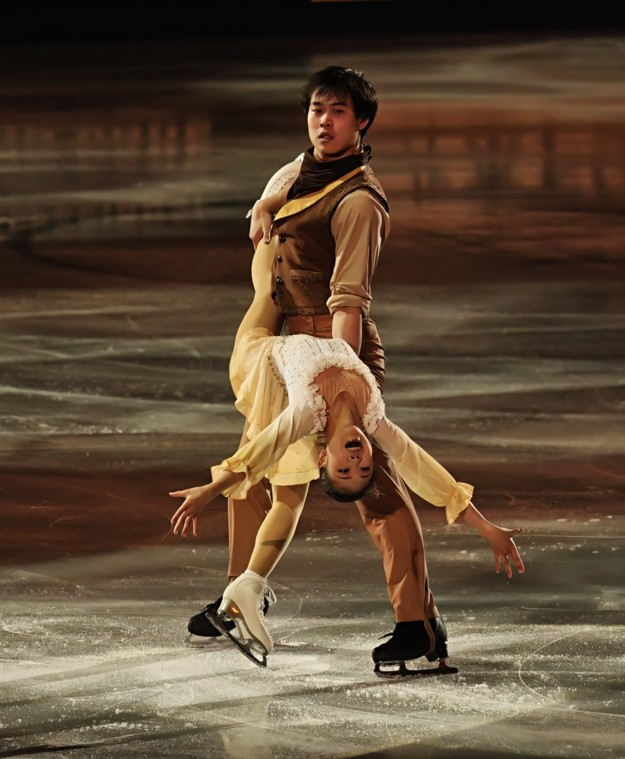
Zhang/Yihang Huang during the gala at the 2024–25 Junior Grand Prix Final

Season	Short program	Free skating	Exhibition
2025–2026	Nemesis by Benjamin Clementine choreo. by Aljona Savchenko	Re:member by Ólafur Arnalds; O by Coldplay; Only the Winds by Ólafur Arnalds choreo. by Benoît Richaud	Turning Page by Sleeping at Last
2024–2025	Dive by Ed Sheeran choreo. by Sui Wenjing	All for One by HAEL & Hidden Citizens choreo. by Sui Wenjing	A Larger Cello by Jay Chou
2023–2024	A Larger Cello by Jay Chou	All for One by HAEL & Hidden Citizens choreo. by Sui Wenjing	
2022–2023	Wanna Be Startin' Somethin'; Billie Jean; Smooth Criminal; Come Together; Dangerous by Michael Jackson	The Curse of the Sad Mummy by League of Legends	

=== Pair skating with Wang Yuchen ===
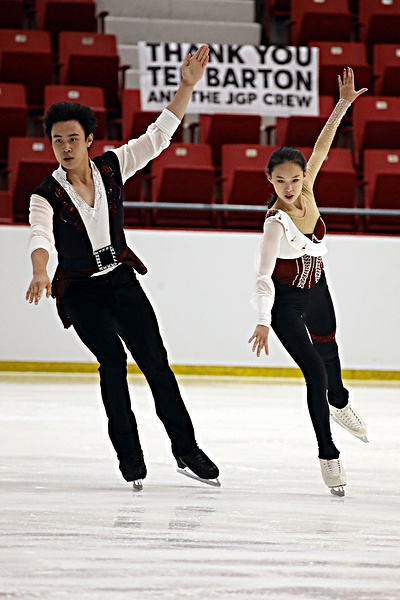
Wang/Huang at the 2019 JGP United States

Season	Short program	Free skating
2021–2022	Go Now (from Sing Street) by Adam Levine choreo. by Elvin Wong	Never Take Off the Mask; The Railroad Waits for No One; Ride; Finale (from The Lone Ranger) by Hans Zimmer choreo. by Elvin Wong
2021–2022	Go Now (from Sing Street) by Adam Levine choreo. by Elvin Wong	Never Take Off the Mask; The Railroad Waits for No One; Ride; Finale (from The Lone Ranger) by Hans Zimmer choreo. by Elvin Wong
2019–2020	Fly Me to the Moon by Bart Howard performed by Frank Sinatra choreo. by David Pelletier, Ekaterina Gordeeva	Pirates of the Caribbean by Klaus Badelt, Hans Zimmer choreo. by Guan Jinlin
2018–2019	Girl's Gotta Do by Jill Barber choreo. by Shae Zukiwsky	O Pastor; Diablo Rojo; Corre Ya choreo. by Shae Zukiwsky

== Competitive highlights ==
- GP – Event of the ISU Grand Prix Series
- JGP – Event of the ISU Junior Grand Prix Series
- CS – Event of the ISU Challenger Series
- TBD – Assigned
- WD – Withdrew from competition

=== Pair skating with Zhang Jiaxuan ===
Competition placements at senior level
Season	2022–23	2023–24	2024–25	2025–26	2026–27
World Championships				9th	
Four Continents Championships				4th	
Chinese Championships	3rd	2nd	1st	3rd	
GP Cup of China				4th	7th
GP Finland				6th	
GP France					7th
CS Nebelhorn Trophy					3rd
Asian Open Trophy				1st	
Skate to Milano				1st	

Competition placements at junior level
Season	2024–25
World Junior Championships	5th
Junior Grand Prix Final	1st
JGP Italy	1st
JGP Poland	1st

=== Pair skating with Wang Yuchen ===
International
Event	17–18	18–19	19–20	20–21	21–22
Worlds				WD	
GP Cup of China				2nd	
GP France					WD
CS Nebelhorn					6th
International: Junior
Junior Worlds			8th		
Youth Olympics			5th		
JGP Canada		8th			
JGP Croatia			9th		
JGP Czech Rep.		13th			
JGP USA			9th		
National
Chinese Championships	8th	5th	1st J		
Team events
Youth Olympics			7th T		

== Detailed results ==
=== Pair skating with Zhang Jiaxuan ===
ISU personal best scores in the +5/-5 GOE System
Segment	Type	Score	Event
Total	TSS	196.29	2026 Four Continents Championships
Short program	TSS	69.05	2026 Four Continents Championships
Short program	TES	39.68	2026 Four Continents Championships
Short program	PCS	29.37	2026 Four Continents Championships
Free skating	TSS	127.24	2026 Four Continents Championships
Free skating	TES	68.48	2026 Four Continents Championships
Free skating	PCS	59.75	2026 Four Continents Championships

==== Senior level ====
Results in the 2025–26 season
Date	Event	SP		FS		Total	
Date	Event	P	Score	P	Score	P	Score
Aug 1–5, 2025	(Philippines) 2025 Asian Open Trophy	1	63.70	1	126.53	1	190.23
Sep 18–21, 2025	(China) 2025 ISU Skate to Milano	1	66.68	1	124.84	1	191.52
Oct 24–26, 2025	2025 Cup of China	5	68.96	4	126.45	4	195.41
Nov 21–23, 2025	(Finland) 2025 Finlandia Trophy	7	62.42	5	122.86	6	185.28
Dec 25–28, 2025	(China) 2026 Chinese Championships	2	72.35	3	127.75	3	200.10
Jan 21–25, 2026	(China) 2026 Four Continents Championships	4	69.05	2	127.24	4	196.29
Mar 24–29, 2026	(Czech Republic) 2026 World Championships	14	62.69	10	122.21	9	184.90

Results in the 2026–27 season
Date	Event	SP		FS		Total	
Date	Event	P	Score	P	Score	P	Score
Sep 24–26, 2026	(Germany) 2026 CS Nebelhorn Trophy	3	64.35	5	103.19	3	167.54
Oct 23-25, 2026	2026 Grand Prix de France	7	54.16	6	99.55	7	153.71
Nov 6–8, 2026	2026 Cup of China	8	56.52	6	99.58	7	156.10

2024–25 season
Date	Event	SP	FS	Total
November 28–December 1, 2024	2024 Chinese Championships	1; 61.35	1; 113.83	1; 175.83
2023–24 season
Date	Event	SP	FS	Total
December 22–24, 2023	2023 Chinese Championships	2; 62.73	3; 106.38	2; 169.11
2022–23 season
Date	Event	SP	FS	Total
January 11–13, 2023	2022 Chinese Championships	3; 60.88	3; 108.38	3; 169.26

==== Junior level ====
2024–25 season
Date	Event	SP	FS	Total
February 26–March 3, 2025	2025 World Junior Championships	3; 57.38	9; 94.03	5; 151.41
December 5–8, 2024	2024–25 JGP Final	1; 62.94	1; 113.15	1; 176.09
September 26–28, 2024	2024 JGP Poland	1; 57.88	1; 104.08	1; 161.96
August 28–31, 2024	2024 JGP Latvia	3; 54.21	1; 105.55	1; 159.76

=== With Wang ===
==== Senior level ====
2021–22 season
Date	Event	SP	FS	Total
October 13–17, 2021	2021 CS Asian Open Trophy	3; 61.70	3; 112.67	3; 174.37
September 22–25, 2021	2021 CS Nebelhorn Trophy	4; 60.21	6; 102.45	6; 162.66
2020–21 season
Date	Event	SP	FS	Total
November 6–8, 2020	2020 Cup of China	2; 63.56	2; 111.84	2; 175.40
2018–19 season
Date	Event	SP	FS	Total
December 29–30, 2018	2019 Chinese Championships	6; 47.44	5; 83.84	5; 131.28
2017–18 season
Date	Event	SP	FS	Total
December 23–24, 2017	2018 Chinese Championships	8; 42.66	8; 76.92	8; 119.58

==== Junior level ====
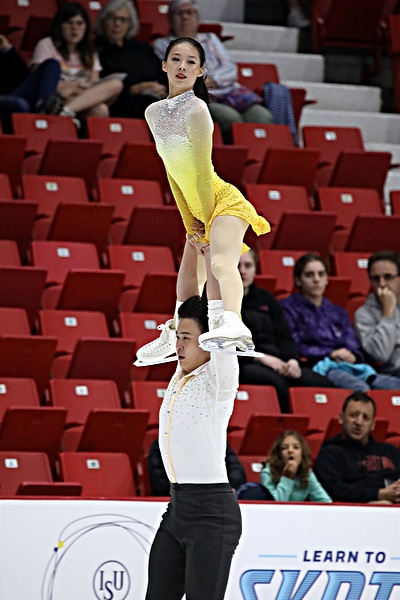
Wang/Huang at the 2019 JGP United States

2019–20 season
Date	Event	SP	FS	Total
March 2–8, 2020	2020 World Junior Championships	8; 54.09	6; 98.01	8; 152.10
January 10–15, 2020	2020 Winter Youth Olympics – Team	–	5; 91.35	7T/5P
January 10–15, 2020	2020 Winter Youth Olympics	6; 46.96	5; 94.65	5; 141.61
September 25–28, 2019	2019 JGP Croatia	10; 47.20	7; 85.56	9; 132.76
September 14–16, 2019	2020 Chinese Championships	1; 57.53	2; 98.37	1; 155.90
August 28–31, 2019	2019 JGP United States	6; 51.33	10; 69.71	9; 121.04
2018–19 season
Date	Event	SP	FS	Total
December 14–19, 2018	2018 Russian-Chinese Winter Youth Games	4; 45.89	4; 81.81	4; 127.70
September 26–29, 2018	2018 JGP Czech Republic	15; 35.95	12; 74.86	13; 110.81
September 12–15, 2018	2018 JGP Canada	9; 39.62	8; 72.59	8; 112.21
