= Andrei Mozalev =

Russian figure skater (born 2003)

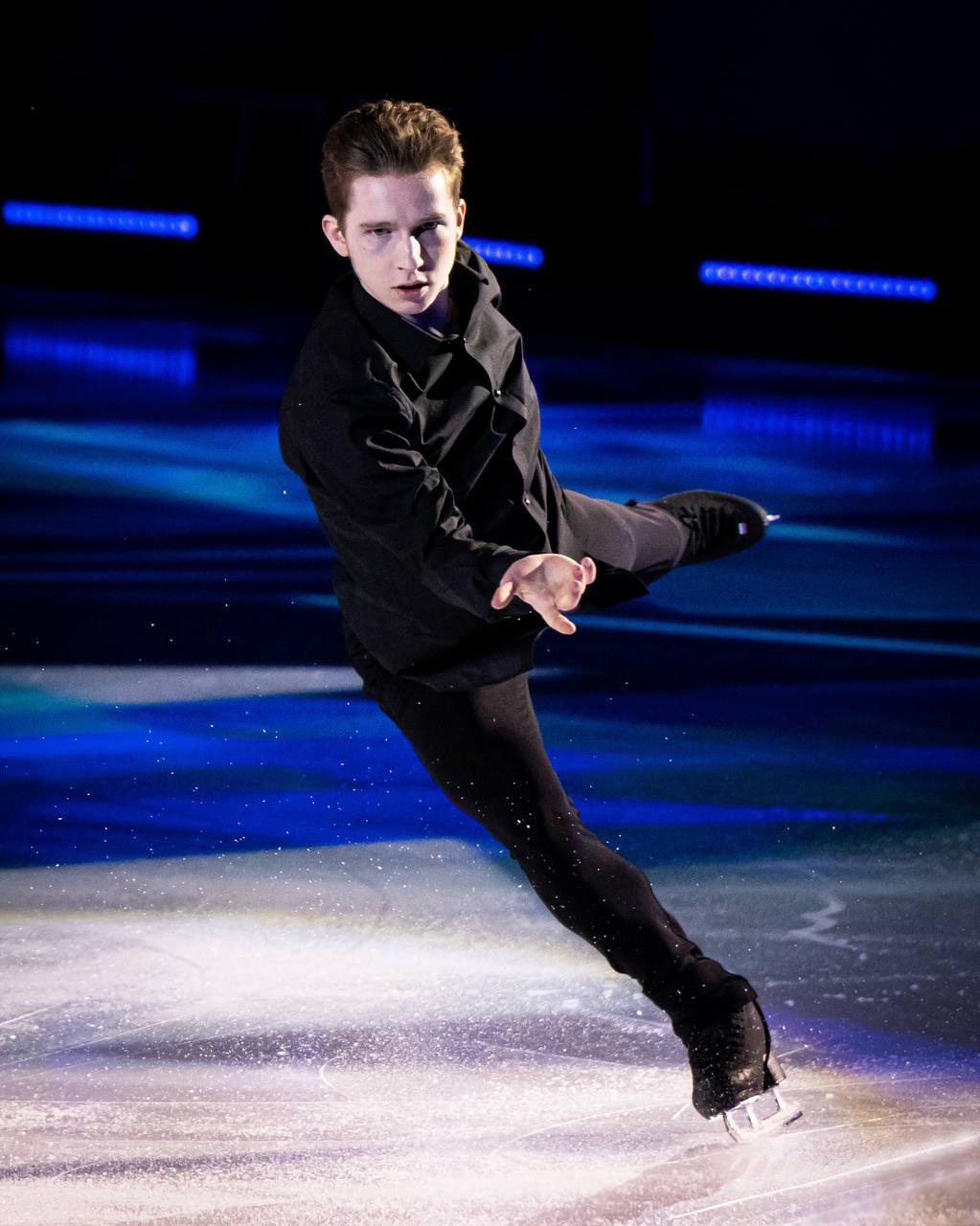
- Mozalev in 2024

Personal information
- Native name: Андрей Михайлович Мозалёв
- Full name: Andrei Mikhailovich Mozalev
- Born: 24 March 2003 (age 23) Saint Petersburg, Russia
- Height: 1.71 m (5 ft 7 in)

Figure skating career
- Country: (Individual Neutral Athletes) Individual Neutral Athlete; Russia
- Coach: Kirill Davydenko
- Skating club: Olympic School Saint Petersburg
- Began skating: 2008
Medal record
Representing Russia
Russian Championships
Bronze medal – third place	2022 Saint Petersburg	Men's singles
Winter Youth Olympics
Silver medal – second place	2020 Lausanne	Men's singles
Bronze medal – third place	2020 Lausanne	Team
World Junior Championships
Gold medal – first place	2020 Tallinn	Men's singles
Junior Grand Prix Final
Silver medal – second place	2019–20 Torino	Men's singles

Andrei Mikhailovich Mozalev (Russian: Андрей Михайлович Мозалёв, born 24 March 2003) is a Russian figure skater who currently competes as an Individual Neutral Athlete. He is the 2019 CS Warsaw Cup champion, the 2022 Russian national bronze medalist, 2020 World Junior champion and the winner of three ISU Junior Grand Prix events (2019 JGP Latvia, 2019 JGP Croatia, 2018 JGP Czech Republic).

== Personal life ==
Mozalev was born on 24 March 2003 in Saint Petersburg, Russia.

== Career ==
=== Early years ===
Mozalev began learning to skate in 2008. He is coached by Kirill Davydenko.

=== 2016–2017 season ===
In November 2016, Mozalev made his international junior-level debut at the 2016 Volvo Open Cup, where he won the gold medal. Three weeks later, he won another gold medal at the 2016 NRW Trophy.

=== 2017–2018 season ===
In November 2017, Mozalev won his third international gold medal at the 2017 Tallinn Trophy.

At the 2018 Russian Junior Championships, he finished seventeenth. He ranked fourth in the short program but was last (eighteenth) in the free skate.

=== 2018–2019 season ===
In late September 2018, Mozalev made his Junior Grand Prix debut in Ostrava, Czech Republic, where he won the gold medal. He ranked second in the short program but won the free skate and outscored the silver medalist, Camden Pulkinen, by a margin of about five points. At his second JGP event of the season, he placed sixth in Yerevan, Armenia.

=== 2019–2020 season ===
In early September 2019, Mozalev won his second JGP gold medal at the 2019 JGP event in Riga, Latvia. He ranked first in both the short program and the free skate and scored his personal best score of 223.72 points. He outscored the silver medalist, South Korean Lee Si-hyeong, by about five points. Mozalev won his second event in Croatia and was the only man to win both of his events in the season. Competing on the senior level, he won gold at the 2019 CS Warsaw Cup.

Qualifying in first position to the 2019–20 JGP Final, he placed first in the short program. Second in the free skate, he won the silver medal behind Shun Sato. He attributed a fall on his triple Axel to difficulty maintaining focus in the second half of his program.

At the 2020 Russian Championships, Mozalev placed second in the short program, only half a point behind leader Makar Ignatov. A ninth-place free skate with two quad errors and a fall on a double Axel dropped him to fifth place overall. Mozalev's coach subsequently said he had taken ill. Competing at the 2020 Winter Youth Olympics, Mozalev won the silver medal in the men's event and a bronze medal in the team event.

Following a bronze medal finish at the Russian Junior Championships, Mozalev was assigned to one of Russia's three men's berths at the 2020 World Junior Championships in Tallinn, Estonia. He placed narrowly second in the short program, behind Youth Olympic champion Yuma Kagiyama. Mozalev then won the free skate, his only error being a hand down on one triple Axel attempt, and won the title.

=== 2020–2021 season ===
Mozalev debuted at the senior Russian test skates, including the quad flip jump, which he landed in the short program. Competing on the domestic Cup of Russia series, he won the silver medals at both the third stage in Sochi and the fourth stage in Kazan, encountering difficulties in the short program at both events but rallying in the free skates.

With the COVID-19 pandemic continuing to affect international travel, the ISU opted to run the Grand Prix based primarily on geographic location. Mozalev made his senior Grand Prix debut at the 2020 Rostelecom Cup, landing his quad flip in the short program but botching his jump combination, ending in sixth place in that segment. He was second in the free skate, despite doubling another planned quad flip, and rose to fourth place, less than two points behind bronze medalist Petr Gumennik.

Competing at the 2021 Russian Championships, Mozalev took a "painful" fall on a downgraded quad flip to open his short program, placing fourth in that segment nonetheless. He landed the quad flip in the free skate, but a series of subsequent jump errors put him in fifth in that segment, remaining in fourth place overall.

Following the national championships, Mozalev competed in the 2021 Channel One Trophy, a televised event organized in lieu of the cancelled European Championships. He was selected for the Red Machine team captained by Alina Zagitova. He was fifth in the short program and fourth in the free skate, while the Red Machine won the trophy. After this, Mozalev prepared for the Russian Cup Final, which was widely assumed to be the deciding event for the second Russian men's berth at the 2021 World Championships in Stockholm. Mozalev was second in the short program despite doing only a triple flip instead of a quad. He fell three times in the free skate, dropping to fourth place overall.

=== 2021–2022 season: Beijing Olympics ===
Mozalev opened his season at the 2021 CS Denis Ten Memorial Challenge, winning the bronze medal. Assigned to only one Grand Prix, he was seventh at the 2021 Internationaux de France. After an error-riddled short program left him in ninth place, he finished second in the free skate, but this only raised him two ordinals in the final standings.

At the 2022 Russian Championships, Mozalev placed eighth in the short program after falling on an underrotated quad Salchow. Second in the free skate, despite a fall on a triple Axel, he won the bronze medal. Despite this, he was not named to the Russian team for the European Championships, the third berth being given to nationals fourth-place finisher Evgeni Semenenko. However, he was subsequently added to the European team following the withdrawal of Mikhail Kolyada, and won the short program with a new personal best, taking a gold small medal. After several jump errors in the free skate, he placed sixth in that segment and dropped to fourth place overall. He was the second of the three Russians at the event, behind Mark Kondratiuk (the gold medalist) and ahead of Semenenko in fifth. On January 20, he was officially named to the Russian Olympic team along with Kondratiuk and Kolyada.

Competing at the 2022 Winter Olympics, Mozalev performed poorly in the short program of the Olympic men's event, making multiple jump errors and finishing twenty-third in the segment to narrowly qualify to the free skate. He fared somewhat better in the free skate, placing eighteenth in that segment and rising to overall nineteenth position.

=== 2026–2027 season ===
On 30 June 2026, the International Skating Union announced that figure skaters from Russia and Belarus would be allowed to compete at international competitions as Individual Neutral Athletes (AINs). Each of these skaters are required to undergo an individual assessment conducted by the ISU Council to determine whether they meet the criteria for neutral status. Mozalev's application was approved, making him eligible to compete internationally as a neutral athlete.

== Programs ==
Season	Short program	Free skating	Exhibition
2024-2025	To Build a Home by The Cinematic Orchestra and Patrick Watson	Gabriel's Oboe performed by The Piano Guys; Guaraní; Asunción (from The Mission) by Ennio Morricone	
2023-2024	Out of Space by Kai Schumacher; Romance by Apocalyptica	My Body Is A Cage by Arcade Fire performed by Peter Gabriel; The Room by Marcel Dettmann and Ben Klock	
2022–2023	I Can't Quit You Baby; Kashmir by Led Zeppelin	Kerber by Yann Tiersen	
2021–2022	Heart Cry by Drehz choreo. by Igor Koscheev and Denis Lunin; Sadeness (Part II) by Enigma choreo. by Igor Koscheev and Denis Lunin	City of Isabel; Moxica and the Horse; Hispañola; Twenty Eighth Parallel; Conquest of Paradise (from 1492: Conquest of Paradise) by Vangelis choreo. by Igor Koscheev and Denis Lunin	Juno and Avos by Alexey Rybnikov choreo. by Igor Koscheev and Denis Lunin
2020–2021	Sadeness (Part II) by Enigma choreo. by Igor Koscheev and Denis Lunin	The Man With the Harmonica (from Once Upon a Time in the West) by Ennio Morricone performed by Apollo 440 choreo. by Igor Koscheev and Denis Lunin	
2019–2020	Juno and Avos by Alexey Rybnikov choreo. by Igor Koscheev and Denis Lunin	Step Up by Aaron Zigman choreo. by Igor Koscheev and Denis Lunin	
2018–2019	Over and Over by Bert Kaempfert performed by Frank Sinatra choreo. by Igor Koscheev and Denis Lunin	Step Up by Aaron Zigman choreo. by Igor Koscheev and Denis Lunin	

== Competitive highlights ==
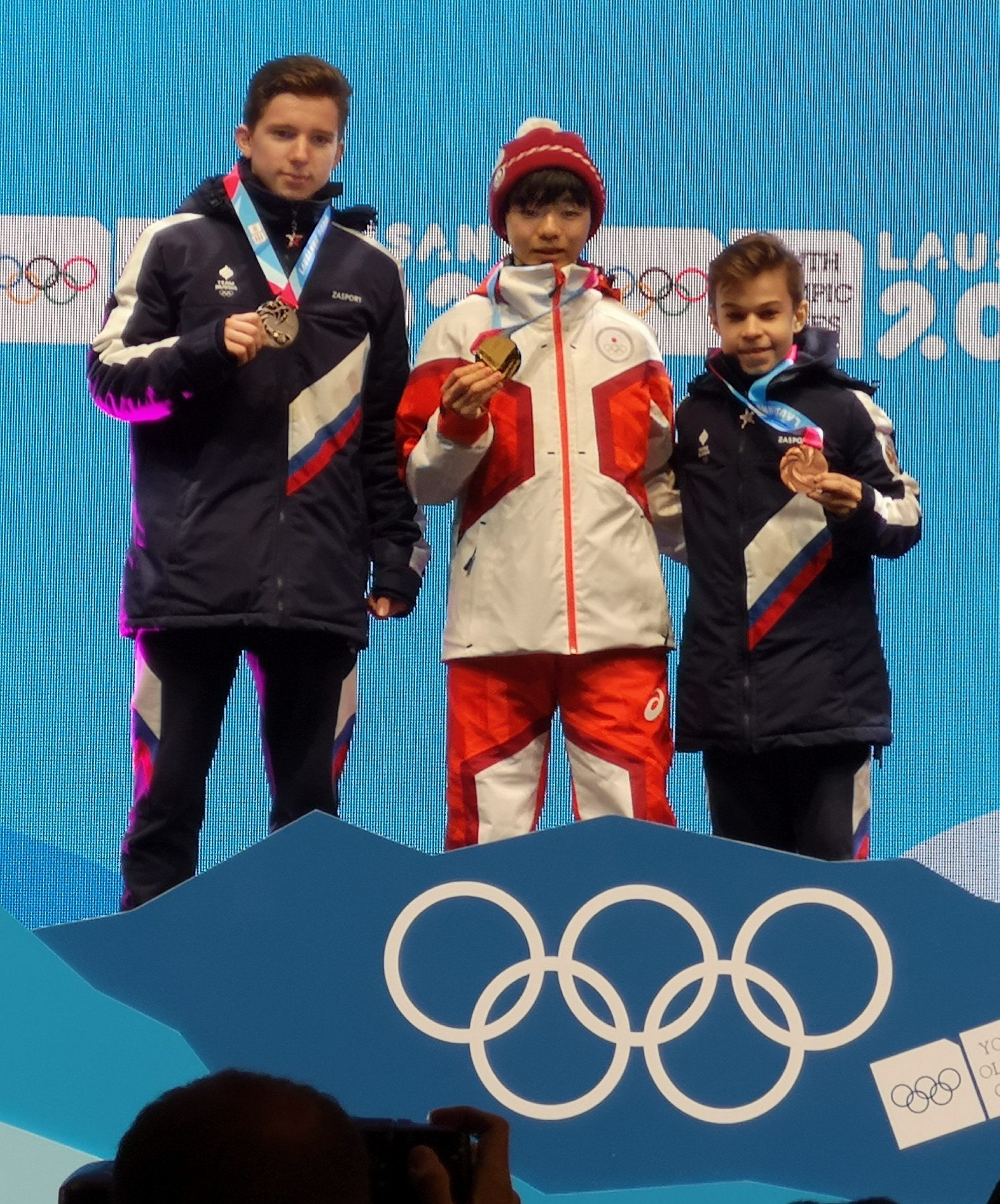
Mozalev (left) with Yuma Kagiyama (center) and Daniil Samsonov (right) on the 2020 Winter Youth Olympics podium

CS: Challenger Series; JGP: Junior Grand Prix

=== Skating as an Individual Neutral Athlete ===
Competition placements at senior level
Season	2026–27
Denkova-Staviski Cup	TBD

=== Skating for Russia ===
International
Event	16–17	17–18	18–19	19–20	20–21	21–22	22–23	23–24	24–25	25–26
Olympics						19th				
Europeans						4th				
GP France						7th				
GP Rostelecom Cup					4th					
CS Denis Ten MC						3rd				
CS Finlandia						WD				
CS Golden Spin						2nd				
CS Warsaw Cup				1st						
Ice Star						1st				
International: Junior
Junior Worlds				1st						
Youth Olympics				2nd						
JGP Final				2nd						
JGP Armenia			6th							
JGP Croatia				1st						
JGP Czech Republic			1st							
JGP Latvia				1st						
NRW Trophy	1st J									
Tallinn Trophy		1st J								
Volvo Open Cup	1st J									
National
Russia				5th	4th	3rd	6th	11th	11th	6th
Russian Jr. Champ.		17th	11th	3rd						
Russian Cup Final (Note: The 2023 Russian Cup Final was renamed as the 2023 Russian Grand Prix Final.)			1st J		4th		6th	6th		
Team events
Youth Olympics				3rd T 2nd P						

== Detailed results ==
Current ISU world best highlighted in bold and italic.

=== Senior level ===
**2021–22 season**
Date	Event	SP	FS	Total
March 25–27, 2022	2022 Channel One Trophy domestic competition	5; 89.12	3; 190.80	1T/3P; 279.92
February 8–10, 2022	2022 Winter Olympics	23; 77.05	18; 156.28	19; 233.33
January 10–16, 2022	2022 European Championships	1; **99.76**	6; 165.93	4; **265.69**
December 21–26, 2021	2022 Russian Championships	8; 90.98	2; 187.30	3; 278.28
December 9–11, 2021	2021 CS Golden Spin of Zagreb	6; 80.71	1; 171.44	2; 252.15
November 19–21, 2021	2021 Internationaux de France	9; 68.77	2; **179.77**	7; 248.54
October 28–31, 2021	2021 CS Denis Ten Memorial Challenge	5; 72.76	3; 161.29	3; 234.05
**2020–21 season**
Date	Event	SP	FS	Total
Feb. 26 – Mar. 2, 2021	2021 Russian Cup Final domestic competition	2; 93.83	5; 158.76	4; 252.59
February 5–7, 2021	2021 Channel One Trophy	5; 79.13	4; 173.82	1T/5P; 252.95
December 23–27, 2020	2021 Russian Championships	4; 89.47	5; 163.45	4; 252.92
November 20–22, 2020	2020 Rostelecom Cup	6; 86.01	2; 180.68	4; 266.69

=== Junior ===
**2019–20 season**
Date	Event	Level	SP	FS	Total
March 2–8, 2020	2020 World Junior Championships	Junior	2; 84.31	1; 160.78	1; 245.09
February 4–8, 2020	2020 Russian Junior Championships	Junior	13; 70.41	1; 179.66	3; 250.07
January 10–15, 2020	2020 Winter Youth Olympics – Team	Junior	–	2; 154.97	3T/2P
January 10–15, 2020	2020 Winter Youth Olympics	Junior	1; 79.72	2; 158.22	2; 237.94
December 24–29, 2019	2020 Russian Championships	Senior	2; 88.34	9; 152.21	5; 240.55
December 5–8, 2019	2019–20 JGP Final	Junior	1; 82.45	2; 159.03	2; 241.48
November 14–17, 2019	2019 CS Warsaw Cup	Senior	1; 83.81	1; 139.44	1; 223.25
September 25–28, 2019	2019 JGP Croatia	Junior	3; 78.85	1; 157.59	1; 236.44
September 4–7, 2019	2019 JGP Latvia	Junior	1; 78.42	1; 145.30	1; 223.72
**2018–19 season**
Date	Event	Level	SP	FS	Total
February 18–22, 2019	2019 Russian Cup Final domestic competition	Junior	1; 86.08	1; 171.52	1; 257.60
February 1–4, 2019	2019 Russian Junior Championships	Junior	5; 79.85	12; 131.56	11; 211.41
December 14–19, 2018	2018 Russian–Chinese Youth Winter Games	Junior	1; 80.12	2; 128.13	2; 208.25
October 10–13, 2018	2018 JGP Armenia	Junior	7; 62.72	4; 131.28	6; 194.28
September 26–29, 2018	2018 JGP Czech Republic	Junior	2; 78.83	1; 138.29	1; 217.12
**2017–18 season**
Date	Event	Level	SP	FS	Total
January 23–26, 2018	2018 Russian Junior Championships	Junior	4; 75.25	18; 117.06	17; 192.31
November 21–26, 2017	2017 Tallinn Trophy	Junior	3; 64.96	1; 137.98	1; 202.94
**2016–17 season**
Date	Event	Level	SP	FS	Total
Nov. 30 – Dec. 4, 2016	2016 NRW Trophy	Junior	2; 64.27	1; 129.29	1; 193.56
November 9–13, 2016	2016 Volvo Open Cup	Junior	2; 62.21	1; 121.37	1; 183.58
