= 2021 Asian Open Figure Skating Trophy =

Skating competition in Beijing, China

2021 CS Asian Open Trophy
- Type: ISU event
- Date: October 13 – 17
- Season: 2021–22
- Location: Beijing, China
- Host: Chinese Skating Association
- Venue: Capital Indoor Stadium

Champions
- Men's singles: (Japan) Yuma Kagiyama
- Women's singles: (Japan) Mai Mihara
- Pairs: (China) Sui Wenjing / Han Cong
- Ice dance: (China) Wang Shiyue / Liu Xinyu
- Previous: 2019 CS Asian Open Trophy
- Next: 2022 Asian Open Trophy

The 2021 Asian Open Figure Skating Trophy was held on October 13–17, 2021, in Beijing, China. It was intended to be a 2021–22 ISU Challenger Series event. However, as only the men's and women's singles events featured international participants and the total number of ISU member nations represented at the event totalled nine, it did not meet the necessary criteria to qualify for Challenger Series status. Medals were awarded in men's singles, women's singles, pair skating, and ice dance.

In January 2021, the International Skating Union announced that the 2021 Asian Open Trophy would replace the 2020–21 Grand Prix Final as the designated international test event for the 2022 Winter Olympics.

After a series of withdrawals by international participants, the 2021 Asian Open Trophy was unable to meet the minimum entry requirements to be classified as a Challenger event. The singles disciplines, which had competitors from multiple countries, were re-classified as regular international events, while the pairs and ice dance events featured only domestic competitors.

== Entries ==
The International Skating Union published the list of entries on September 21, 2021.

Country	Men	Women	Pairs	Ice dance
China	Chen Yudong; Jin Boyang; Peng Zhiming	Jin Hengxin; Zhu Yi	Peng Cheng / Jin Yang; Sui Wenjing / Han Cong; Wang Yuchen / Huang Yihang; Zhang Siyang / Yang Yongchao	Chen Hong / Sun Zhuoming; Wang Shiyue / Liu Xinyu
Chinese Taipei		Ting Tzu-Han		
Finland		Jenni Saarinen		
Germany		Kristina Isaev; Nicole Schott		
Hong Kong	Lap Kan Yuen	Joanna So		
Japan	Yuma Kagiyama; Shun Sato	Mai Mihara; Kaori Sakamoto		
Latvia	Deniss Vasiļjevs			
South Korea	Cha Jun-hwan; Lee Si-hyeong			
Switzerland	Lukas Britschgi			

== Changes to preliminary assignments ==
Date	Discipline	Withdrew	Added	Notes	Ref.
September 27	Ice dance	(Japan) Misato Komatsubara / Tim Koleto	—		
September 28	Men	(Germany) Paul Fentz	—		
September 28	Men	(United States) Jimmy Ma	—		
September 28	Men	(United States) Camden Pulkinen	—		
September 28	Women	(United States) Mariah Bell	—		
September 28	Women	(United States) Gabriella Izzo	—		
September 28	Pairs	(United States) Emily Chan / Spencer Akira Howe	—		
September 28	Pairs	(United States) Audrey Lu / Misha Mitrofanov	—		
September 29	Women	(Cyprus) Marilena Kitromilis	—		
October 1	Women	(Czech Republic) Eliška Březinová	—		
October 1	Ice dance	(Armenia) Tina Garabedian / Simon Proulx-Sénécal	—	Conflict with 2021 Budapest Trophy	
October 6	Women	(Japan) Rika Kihira	(Japan) Mai Mihara		
October 6	Women	(Mongolia) Maral-Erdene Gansukh	—		
October 6	Women	(Thailand) Thita Lamsam	—		
October 6	Women	(Thailand) Teekhree Silpa-Archa	—		
October 8	Men	—	(China) Peng Zhiming		
October 8	Women	(China) Chen Hongyi	(China) Jin Hengxin		
October 8	Women	(China) Lin Shan	—		
October 8	Women	(South Korea) Lim Eun-soo	—		
October 8	Women	(South Korea) Wi Seo-yeong	—		
October 10	Men	(Hong Kong) Harrison Jon-Yen Wong	—		

== Results ==
=== Men's singles ===
Rank	Skater	Nation	Total points	SP		FS	
1st place, gold medalist(s)	Yuma Kagiyama	Japan	277.78	1	97.80	1	179.98
2nd place, silver medalist(s)	Shun Sato	Japan	256.16	2	90.77	2	165.39
3rd place, bronze medalist(s)	Jin Boyang	China	224.09	3	85.02	6	139.07
4	Deniss Vasiļjevs	Latvia	217.68	4	84.75	7	132.93
5	Lukas Britschgi	Switzerland	217.04	6	69.07	3	147.97
6	Cha Jun-hwan	South Korea	214.24	5	74.47	5	139.77
7	Lee Si-hyeong	South Korea	209.64	8	66.09	4	143.55
8	Peng Zhiming	China	167.68	9	55.16	8	112.52
9	Chen Yudong	China	148.35	7	66.37	10	81.98
10	Lap Kan Yuen	Hong Kong	147.88	10	48.62	9	99.26

=== Women's singles ===
Rank	Skater	Nation	Total points	SP		FS	
1st place, gold medalist(s)	Mai Mihara	Japan	203.58	2	67.83	1	135.75
2nd place, silver medalist(s)	Kaori Sakamoto	Japan	202.28	1	76.70	2	125.58
3rd place, bronze medalist(s)	Joanna So	Hong Kong	155.65	4	53.50	4	102.15
4	Ting Tzu-Han	Chinese Taipei	155.03	8	51.84	3	103.19
5	Jenni Saarinen	Finland	154.45	3	62.25	8	92.20
6	Nicole Schott	Germany	148.08	6	52.84	5	95.24
7	Zhu Yi	China	147.38	5	52.88	6	94.50
8	Kristina Isaev	Germany	146.05	7	52.43	7	93.62
9	Jin Hengxin	China	118.11	9	51.27	9	66.84

=== Pairs ===
Rank	Team	Nation	Total points	SP		FS	
1st place, gold medalist(s)	Sui Wenjing / Han Cong	China	223.48	1	79.27	1	144.21
2nd place, silver medalist(s)	Peng Cheng / Jin Yang	China	196.68	2	66.41	2	130.27
3rd place, bronze medalist(s)	Wang Yuchen / Huang Yihang	China	174.37	3	61.70	3	112.67
4	Zhang Siyang / Yang Yongchao	China	167.76	4	57.86	4	109.90

=== Ice dance ===
Rank	Team	Nation	Total points	RD		FD	
1st place, gold medalist(s)	Wang Shiyue / Liu Xinyu	China	186.58	1	75.67	1	110.91
2nd place, silver medalist(s)	Chen Hong / Sun Zhuoming	China	160.83	2	62.33	2	98.50
