= Wang Yuchen (figure skater) =

Chinese pair skater

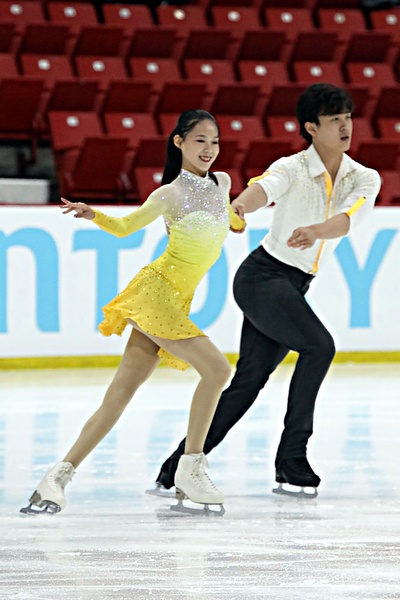
- Wang/Huang at the 2019 JGP United States

Personal information
- Native name: 王瑀晨 (Chinese)
- Born: June 15, 2005 (age 21) Changchun, China
- Height: 1.66 m (5 ft 5 1/2 in)

Figure skating career
- Country: China
- Partner: Zhu Lei (since 2023); Huang Yihang (2017-2022)
- Coach: Zhang Tianci
- Skating club: Jilin Winter Sports Center
- Began skating: 2011

Wang Yuchen (Chinese: 王瑀晨; pinyin: Wáng Yǔchén; born June 15, 2005) is a Chinese pair skater. With her former skating partner, Huang Yihang, she is the 2020 Cup of China silver medalist, the 2020 Chinese junior national champion, and placed in the top eight at the 2020 World Junior Championships.

== Personal life ==
Wang was born on June 15, 2005, in Changchun, Jilin, China. In addition to figure skating, she also enjoys photography.

== Career ==
=== Partnership with Huang ===
Wang started skating in 2011.

She teamed up with Huang Yihang prior to the 2017–18 season to pursue pair skating. They were initially coached by Luan Bo. Debuting at the 2018 Chinese Championships, the pair finished eighth. They would begin training under Zhao Hongbo, Guan Jinlin, and Zhang Tianci in Beijing after the season ended.

==== 2018–2019 season ====
Wang/Huang were added to the Chinese national team ahead of the season to replace an injured Yu Xiaoyu / Zhang Hao. They made their junior international debut on the Junior Grand Prix, placing eighth in Canada and 13th in the Czech Republic. In early December, Wang/Huang competed at the Russian-Chinese Winter Youth Games, where they finished fourth. They ended their season by finishing fifth at the 2019 Chinese Championships.

==== 2019–2020 season ====
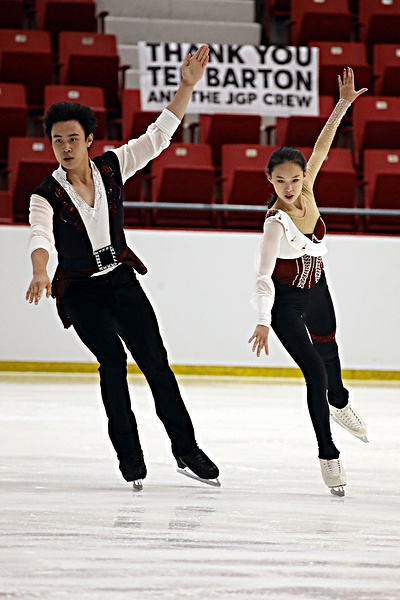
Wang/Huang at the 2019 JGP United States

Wang/Huang opened their season on the Junior Grand Prix and finished eighth at both their events in the United States and Croatia. In between the two JGP events, they competed at the 2020 Chinese Championships, where they won the junior title by 0.01 points ahead of Wang Huidi / Jia Ziqi and Li Jiaen / Wang Zijian.

Wang/Huang were assigned to compete at the 2020 Winter Youth Olympics in Lausanne, Switzerland in January. On being selected, Wang said: "I am very excited to participate in such a large competition for the first time. In order to achieve our competition goal, I will train hard and strive to skate in my best form and win glory for the country." Wang/Huang went on to place fifth in the individual event. Huang expressed dissatisfaction with their performance and called it a "learning opportunity." As part of Team Future during the team event, they again placed fifth to help the team finish seventh overall.

Wang/Huang finished their season at the 2020 World Junior Championships in March. Placing eighth in the short program and sixth in the free skating, they ended in eighth place overall.

==== 2020–2021 season ====
Due to the COVID-19 pandemic, the Junior Grand Prix series was cancelled and the Grand Prix events were limited to domestic competitors or skaters who trained in the host nation's immediate geographic region. As a result, Wang/Huang were assigned to make their senior debut at the 2020 Cup of China. They finished second in both segments to earn the silver medal behind Peng Cheng / Jin Yang.

In January 2021, Wang/Huang participated in the New Year's Day Ice Carnival, a domestic team competition held among the Chinese national team, as part of Sui Wenjing's Team Elite alongside Jin Boyang, Chen Hongyi, Wang Yihan, and Chen Hong / Sun Zhuoming. They lost the competition to Han Cong's Team Sharp Blades after falling behind on the first day of competition.

==== 2021–2022 season ====
Wang/Huang were assigned to compete at the 2021 CS Nebelhorn Trophy to attempt to qualify a third berth for Chinese pairs at the 2022 Winter Olympics. They placed fourth in the short program, third among the teams seeking the three available spots, but dropped to sixth place after three falls in their free skate, and did not qualify a place.

They went on to win the bronze medal at the 2021 CS Asian Open Trophy. The pair parted ways following the season.

=== Partnership with Zhu ===
==== 2023–24 season ====
For the 2023–24 figure skating season, it was announced that Wang had teamed up with Zhu Lei and that they would be coached by Zhang Tianci in Hebei. Wang/Zhu were invited to make their ISU Grand Prix debut at the 2023 Cup of China, where they finished in seventh place. They would go on to finish twelfth at the 2024 Four Continents in Shanghai.

==== 2024–25 season ====
Wang/Zhu started the season by finishing eighth at the 2024 Cup of China. One week following that event, the pair would place fifth at the 2024 Chinese Championships.

Selected to compete at the 2025 Asian Winter Games in Harbin, China, Wang/Zhu finished the event in fifth place.

== Programs ==
=== With Zhu ===
Season	Short program	Free skating	Exhibition
2024–2025	Never Be Apart by Teeks choreo. by Zhang Tianci	Kung Fu Piano: Cello Ascends by The Piano Guys choreo. by Zhang Tianci	Peacock Dance by Jenny Koo; Beautiful Myth by Sun Nan
2023–2024	Parla Piu Piano (from The Godfather) by Nino Rota choreo. by Zhang Tianci	On the Shore of Lake Baikal by Li Jian & Tan Yizhe choreo. by Zhang Tianci	

=== With Huang ===
Season	Short program	Free skating
2021–2022	Go Now (from Sing Street) by Adam Levine choreo. by Elvin Wong	Never Take Off the Mask; The Railroad Waits for No One; Ride; Finale (from The Lone Ranger) by Hans Zimmer choreo. by Elvin Wong
2020–2021	Go Now (from Sing Street) by Adam Levine choreo. by Elvin Wong	Never Take Off the Mask; The Railroad Waits for No One; Ride; Finale (from The Lone Ranger) by Hans Zimmer choreo. by Elvin Wong
2019–2020	Fly Me to the Moon by Bart Howard performed by Frank Sinatra choreo. by David Pelletier, Ekaterina Gordeeva	Pirates of the Caribbean by Klaus Badelt, Hans Zimmer choreo. by Guan Jinlin
2018–2019	Girl's Gotta Do by Jill Barber choreo. by Shae Zukiwsky	O Pastor; Diablo Rojo; Corre Ya choreo. by Shae Zukiwsky

== Competitive highlights ==
CS: Challenger Series; GP: Grand Prix; JGP: Junior Grand Prix

=== With Zhu ===
International
Event	23–24	24–25
Four Continents	12th	
GP Cup of China	7th	8th
National
Chinese Champ.		5th
TBD = Assigned

=== With Huang ===
International
Event	17–18	18–19	19–20	20–21	21–22
Worlds				WD	
GP Cup of China				2nd	
GP France					WD
CS Nebelhorn					6th
CS Asian Open					3rd
International: Junior
Junior Worlds			8th		
Youth Olympics			5th		
JGP Canada		8th			
JGP Croatia			9th		
JGP Czech Rep.		13th			
JGP USA			9th		
National
Chinese Champ.	8th	5th	1st J		
Team events
Youth Olympics			7th T 5th P		
TBD = Assigned; WD = Withdrew; Levels: J = Junior; T = Team result; P = Personal result. Medals awarded for team result only.

== Detailed results ==
Current personal best scores are highlighted in bold.

=== With Zhu ===
**2024–2025 season**
Date	Event	SP	FS	Total
November 28–December 1, 2024	2024 Chinese Championships	3; 52.93	6; 82.63	5; 135.56
November 22–24, 2023	2024 Cup of China	5; 55.14	8; 81.76	8; 136.90

**2023–2024 season**
Date	Event	SP	FS	Total
January 30-February 4, 2024	2024 Four Continents Championships	11; **53.66**	12; 85.90	12; **139.56**
November 10–12, 2023	2023 Cup of China	7; 49.95	8; **89.40**	7; 139.35

=== With Huang ===
==== Senior results ====
**2021–22 season**
Date	Event	SP	FS	Total
October 13–17, 2021	2021 CS Asian Open Trophy	3; 61.70	3; 112.67	3; 174.37
September 22–25, 2021	2021 CS Nebelhorn Trophy	4; 60.21	6; 102.45	6; 162.66
2020–21 season
Date	Event	SP	FS	Total
November 6–8, 2020	2020 Cup of China	2; 63.56	2; 111.84	2; 175.40
2018–19 season
Date	Event	SP	FS	Total
December 29–30, 2018	2019 Chinese Championships	6; 47.44	5; 83.84	5; 131.28
2017–18 season
Date	Event	SP	FS	Total
December 23–24, 2017	2018 Chinese Championships	8; 42.66	8; 76.92	8; 119.58

==== Junior results ====
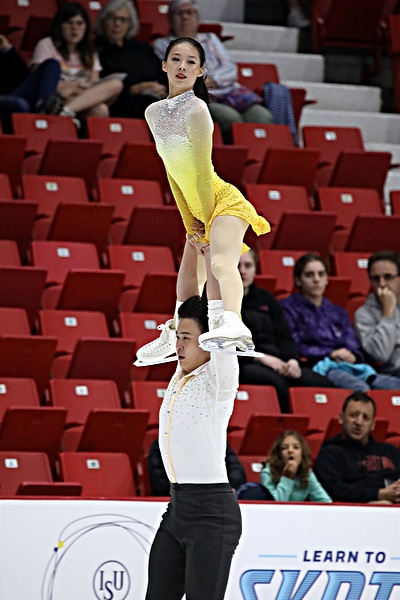
Wang/Huang at the 2019 JGP United States

2019–20 season
Date	Event	SP	FS	Total
March 2–8, 2020	2020 World Junior Championships	8; 54.09	6; 98.01	8; 152.10
January 10–15, 2020	2020 Winter Youth Olympics – Team	–	5; 91.35	7T/5P
January 10–15, 2020	2020 Winter Youth Olympics	6; 46.96	5; 94.65	5; 141.61
September 25–28, 2019	2019 JGP Croatia	10; 47.20	7; 85.56	9; 132.76
September 14–16, 2019	2020 Chinese Championships	1; 57.53	2; 98.37	1; 155.90
August 28–31, 2019	2019 JGP United States	6; 51.33	10; 69.71	9; 121.04
2018–19 season
Date	Event	SP	FS	Total
December 14–19, 2018	2018 Russian-Chinese Winter Youth Games	4; 45.89	4; 81.81	4; 127.70
September 26–29, 2018	2018 JGP Czech Republic	15; 35.95	12; 74.86	13; 110.81
September 12–15, 2018	2018 JGP Canada	9; 39.62	8; 72.59	8; 112.21
