= Alina Butaeva =

Georgian figure skater

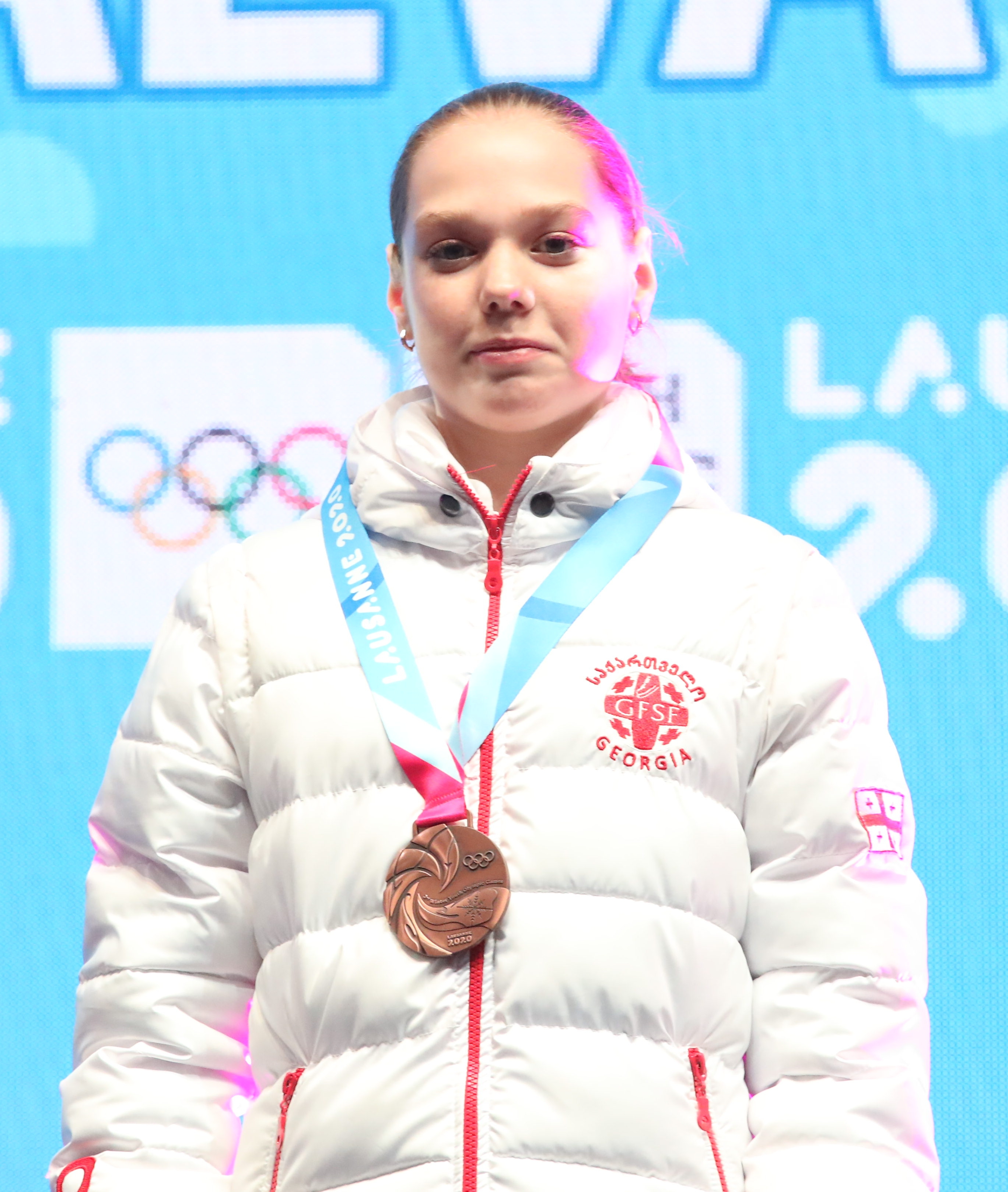
- Butaeva receives her bronze medal at the 2020 Winter Youth Olympics.

Personal information
- Native name: ალინა ბუთაევა (Georgian); Алина Дмитриевна Бутаева (Russian)
- Full name: Alina Dmitrievna Butaeva
- Born: 9 December 2005 (age 20) Kazan, Russia
- Home town: Perm, Russia
- Height: 1.58 m (5 ft 2 in)

Figure skating career
- Country: Georgia
- Coach: Pavel Sliusarenko, Alexei Menshikov
- Skating club: Perm Krai Sports Center
- Began skating: 2008
Medal record
Representing Georgia
Figure skating: Pairs
Winter Youth Olympics
| Bronze medal – third place | 2020 Lausanne | Pairs |
Representing Mixed-NOCs
Winter Youth Olympics
| Gold medal – first place | 2020 Lausanne | Team |

Alina Butaeva (Georgian: ალინა ბუთაევა, born 9 December 2005) is a Georgian pair skater. With her former partner, Luka Berulava, she won two medals at the 2020 Winter Youth Olympics − bronze in pairs and gold in the team event.

== Personal life ==
Butaeva was born on 9 December 2005 in Kazan, Russia. She resides in Perm.

== Career ==
=== Early years ===
Butaeva began learning how to skate as a three-year-old, in 2008. She originally competed as a single skater, coached by Ksenia Ivanova in Kazan. Butaeva teamed up with Luka Berulava prior to the 2019–20 season to compete in pair skating for Georgia. The pair decided to train in Perm, coached by Pavel Sliusarenko and Alexei Menshikov.

=== 2019–20 season: International junior debut ===
Butaeva/Berulava made their debut for Georgia in September 2019, placing eighth at an ISU Junior Grand Prix (JGP) event in Poland and then sixth at JGP Croatia. Their results earned a spot for Georgia in the pairs' event at the 2020 Winter Youth Olympics. In November, they took bronze in the junior pairs' category at the Volvo Open Cup in Riga, Latvia. In December, they won the junior event at the Golden Spin of Zagreb.

In January 2020, Butaeva/Berulava competed at the 2020 Winter Youth Olympics in Lausanne, Switzerland. Ranked third in both segments, they won the bronze medal behind two pairs from Russia, Apollinariia Panfilova / Dmitry Rylov and Diana Mukhametzianova / Ilya Mironov. This was Georgia's first medal in the Winter Youth Olympic Games, and their tenth medal in the Youth Olympic Games overall. The pair also received a gold medal for their participation in the team event as part of Team Courage, composed also of Arlet Levandi from Estonia, Ksenia Sinitsyna from Russia, and ice dancers Utana Yoshida / Shingo Nishiyama from Japan. Butaeva/Berulava finished the season at the 2020 World Junior Championships, where they placed seventh.

=== End of Partnership ===
Butaeva / Berulava did not compete during the 2020 - 21 season and in the 2021 - 2022 season, Berulava was competing with a new partner, indicating the two had split.

== Programs ==
(with Berulava)

| Season | Short program | Free skating |
|---|---|---|
| 2019–2020 | O Fortuna (from Carmina Burana) by Carl Orff | D'Artagnan by Maxime Rodriguez |

== Competitive highlights ==
JGP: Junior Grand Prix

=== Pair skating with Luka Berulava ===
Competition placements at junior level
| Season | 2019–20 |
|---|---|
| Winter Youth Olympics | 3rd |
| Winter Youth Olympics (Team event) | 1st |
| World Junior Championships | 7th |
| JGP Croatia | 6th |
| JGP Poland | 8th |
| Golden Spin of Zagreb | 1st |
| Volvo Open Cup | 3rd |

== Detailed results ==
Small medals for short and free programs awarded only at ISU Championships.

=== With Berulava ===
==== Junior results ====
2019–2020 season
| Date | Event | SP | FS | Total |
| 2–8 March 2020 | 2020 World Junior Championships | 7; 55.96 | 8; 97.21 | 7; 153.17 |
| 10–15 January 2020 | 2020 Winter Youth Olympics – Team | - | 3; 100.70 | 1T/3P |
| 10–15 January 2020 | 2020 Winter Youth Olympics | 3; 59.14 | 3; 98.15 | 3; 157.29 |
| 4–7 December 2019 | 2019 Golden Spin | 3; 51.32 | 1; 91.22 | 1; 142.54 |
| 5–10 November 2019 | 2019 Volvo Open Cup | 3; 55.92 | 3; 100.62 | 3; 156.54 |
| 25–28 September 2019 | 2019 JGP Croatia | 6; 51.27 | 5; 90.78 | 6; 142.05 |
| 18–21 September 2019 | 2019 JGP Poland | 8; 45.29 | 9; 80.73 | 8; 126.02 |
