= Artem Darenskyi =

Ukrainian pair skater

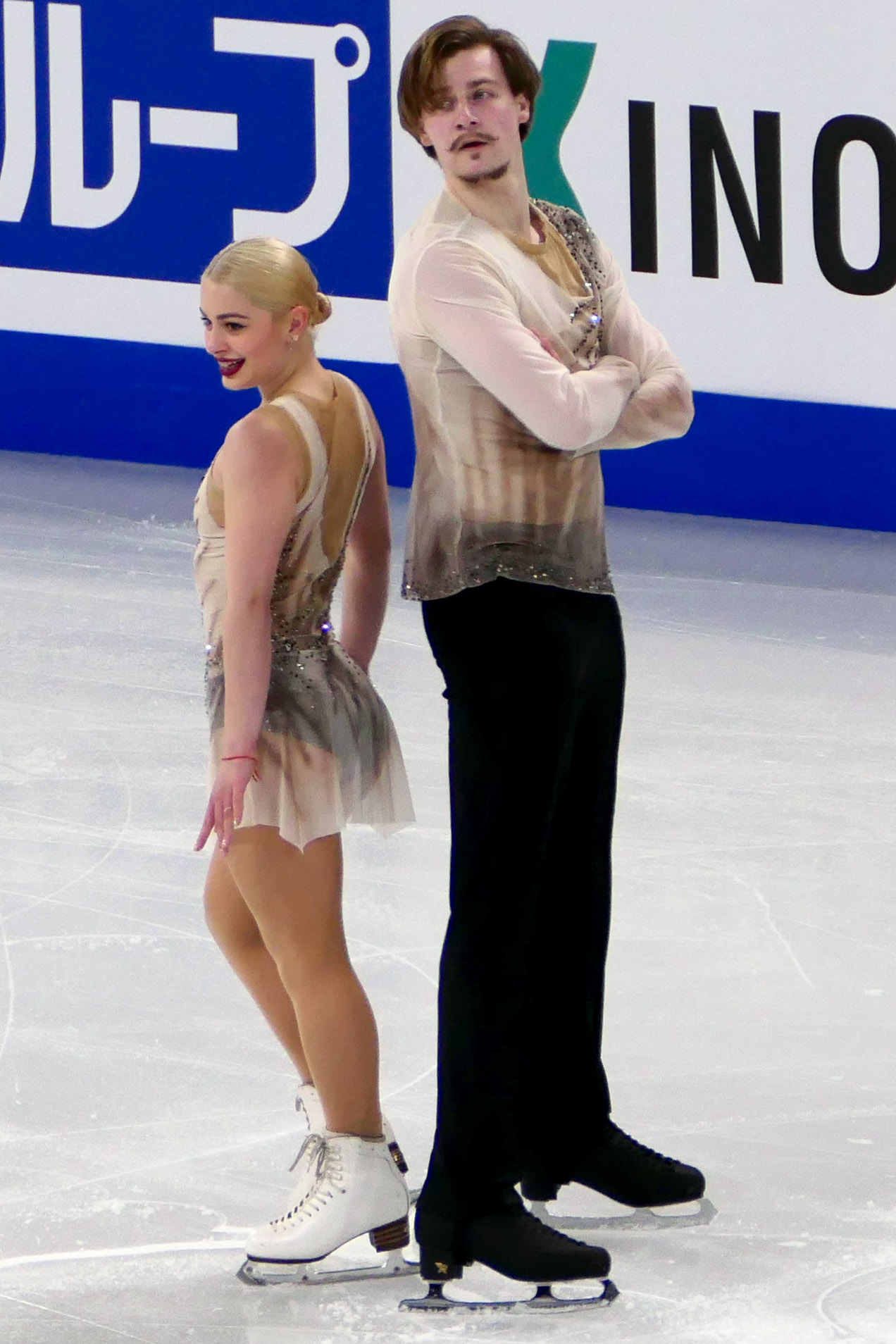
- Sofiia Holichenko and Artem Darenskyi at the 2024 World Championships

Personal information
- Native name: Артем Андрійович Даренський
- Full name: Artem Andriyovych Darenskyi
- Born: 7 July 2001 (age 25) Dnipro, Ukraine
- Height: 1.92 m (6 ft 4 in)

Figure skating career
- Country: Ukraine
- Discipline: Pair skating
- Partner: Sofiia Holichenko (since 2020); Sofiia Nesterova (2017–20); Anastasiia Smirnova (2015–18)
- Coach: Ihor Marchenko
- Skating club: MDUSH of Winter Sport, Dnipro
- Began skating: 2006

Medal record
Ukrainian Championships
Gold medal – first place	2018 Kyiv	Pairs
Gold medal – first place	2019 Kyiv	Pairs
Gold medal – first place	2022 Kyiv	Pairs
Gold medal – first place	2023 Bohuslav	Pairs
Gold medal – first place	2024 Bohuslav	Pairs
Silver medal – second place	2021 Kyiv	Pairs
Bronze medal – third place	2020 Kyiv	Pairs
Winter Youth Olympics
Bronze medal – third place	2020 Lausanne	Team
World Junior Championships
Silver medal – second place	2025 Debrecen	Pairs

Artem Andriyovych Darenskyi (Ukrainian: Артем Андрійович Даренський; born 7 July 2001) is a Ukrainian pair skater who currently competes with Sofiia Holichenko. With Holichenko, he is the 2025 World Junior silver medalist, a three-time Ukrainian national senior champion (2022–24), and the 2023 CS Golden Spin of Zagreb bronze medalist. With his former skating partner, Sofiia Nesterova, he is a two-time Ukrainian national senior champion. The pair has competed in the final segment at two World Junior Championships, finishing within the top eight at the 2019 edition.

== Career ==
=== Early years ===
Darenskyi began learning to skate in 2004. His first pair skating partner was Anastasiia Smirnova. The two won silver at the 2016 Ukrainian Junior Championships and gold the following season.

=== 2017–18 season ===
Smirnova/Darenskyi became age-eligible for junior international events at the start of the season. Coached by Lilia Batutina in Dnipro, the pair competed at two ISU Junior Grand Prix assignments, placing 9th in Riga, Latvia, and then 11th in Minsk, Belarus.

Darenskyi and Sofiia Nesterova began their partnership around November 2017, coached by Batutina in Dnipro. Their training was limited due to a leg injury sustained by Nesterova, but the pair decided to compete at the Ukrainian Championships in December.

Nesterova/Darenskyi's international debut came in early February 2018 at the Toruń Cup in Poland. They won bronze and obtained the minimum technical scores required to compete at the 2018 World Junior Championships in Sofia. They qualified to the final segment at the March event in Bulgaria and finished 14th overall.

=== 2018–19 season ===
Nesterova/Darenskyi competed at two ISU Junior Grand Prix events in September, placing fifth in Linz, Austria, and eighth in Ostrava, Czech Republic. In December, they won their second senior national title. Ranked eighth in both segments, they finished eighth at the 2019 World Junior Championships in March in Zagreb, Croatia.

=== 2019–20 season ===
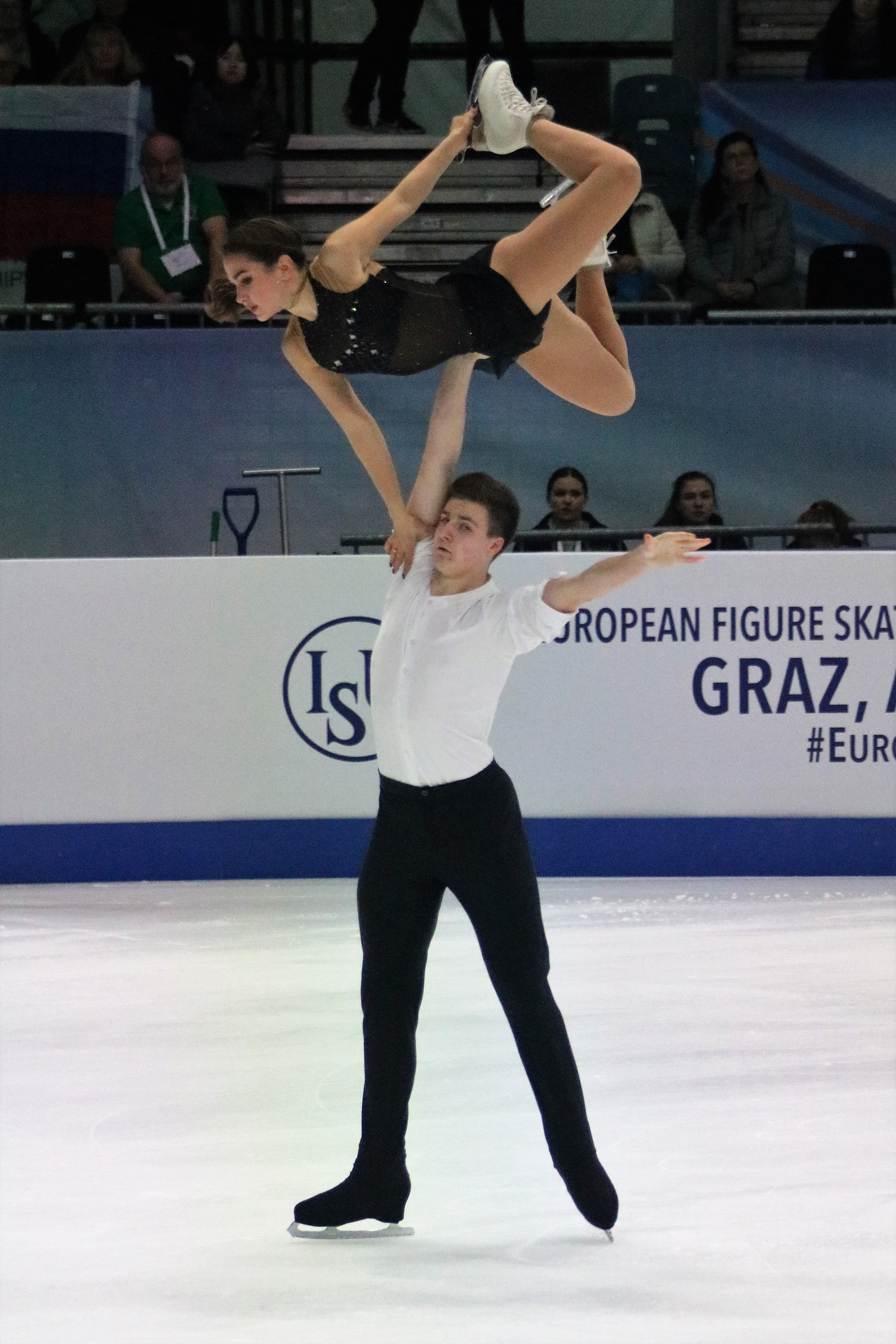
Nesterova/Darenskyi at the 2020 European Championships

Nestrova/Darenski placed twelfth and tenth at their two JGP events. They were fifth at the Volvo Open Cup in November. In December, they were nineteenth at the 2019 CS Golden Spin of Zagreb. They placed third at nationals. They were chosen to compete at the 2020 Youth Olympic Games. They were part of the bronze-medalling winning team in the Team Event. They were disqualified at the 2020 European Championships due to Nesterova testing positive for a banned substance.

In March, it was announced that Nesterova and Darenski were splitting up, as Nesterova had retired. In June, it was announced that he had formed a new partnership with Sofiia Holichenko.

=== 2020–21 season: Debut of Holichenko/Darenskyi ===
After obtaining the required minimum technical elements scores, Holichenko/Darenskyi were nominated to represent Ukraine at the 2021 World Championships in Stockholm. They withdrew a few days before the start of the competition, having tested positive for coronavirus.

=== 2021–22 season: Beijing Olympics ===
Holichenko/Darenskyi began the season at the 2021 CS Nebelhorn Trophy, attempting to qualify a berth for Ukraine at the 2022 Winter Olympics. They placed eleventh at the event, outside the qualifications. However, Ukraine qualified to the Olympic team event due to Anastasiia Shabotova qualifying to the women's competition at Nebelhorn, allowing for a Ukrainian pair to be sent for that. Holichenko/Darenskyi went on to finish fifth at the Budapest Trophy.

After winning their first Ukrainian national title, Holichenko/Darenskyi placed fifteenth at the 2022 European Championships in Tallinn. Days later, they were named to the Ukrainian Olympic team. They finished ninth among nine pairs entered in the short program of the Olympic team event. This was their only performance at the Games, as Team Ukraine did not advance to the second stage of the competition and finished tenth.

The team returned home to Dnipro after the Olympics and immediately found themselves in the midst of Vladimir Putin's invasion of Ukraine. They enlisted Canadian music editor Hugo Chouinard to change their short program music in advance of the 2022 World Championships in Montpellier, hoping to inspire the country with Ukrainian music. They undertook a six-day journey to France, via Romania, Italy and Poland, with Darenskyi saying that their goal was "to show that Ukrainian athletes are fighting for their country." On arrival, they received a standing ovation and placed thirteenth in the short program with very limited training. In light of this, they opted not to compete in the free skate. They temporarily left home to live and train in the Polish city of Toruń for the foreseeable future.

=== 2022–23 season ===
Prior to the season beginning, it was announced that Holichenko/Darenskyi had left Toruń and returned to Dnipro to train.

Holichenko/Darenskyi's lone competitive appearance for the season came at the 2022 CS Nebelhorn Trophy, where they finished in twelfth place. They missed the rest of the season due to injury and only returned to compete at the 2023 Ukrainian Championships in April, which they won.

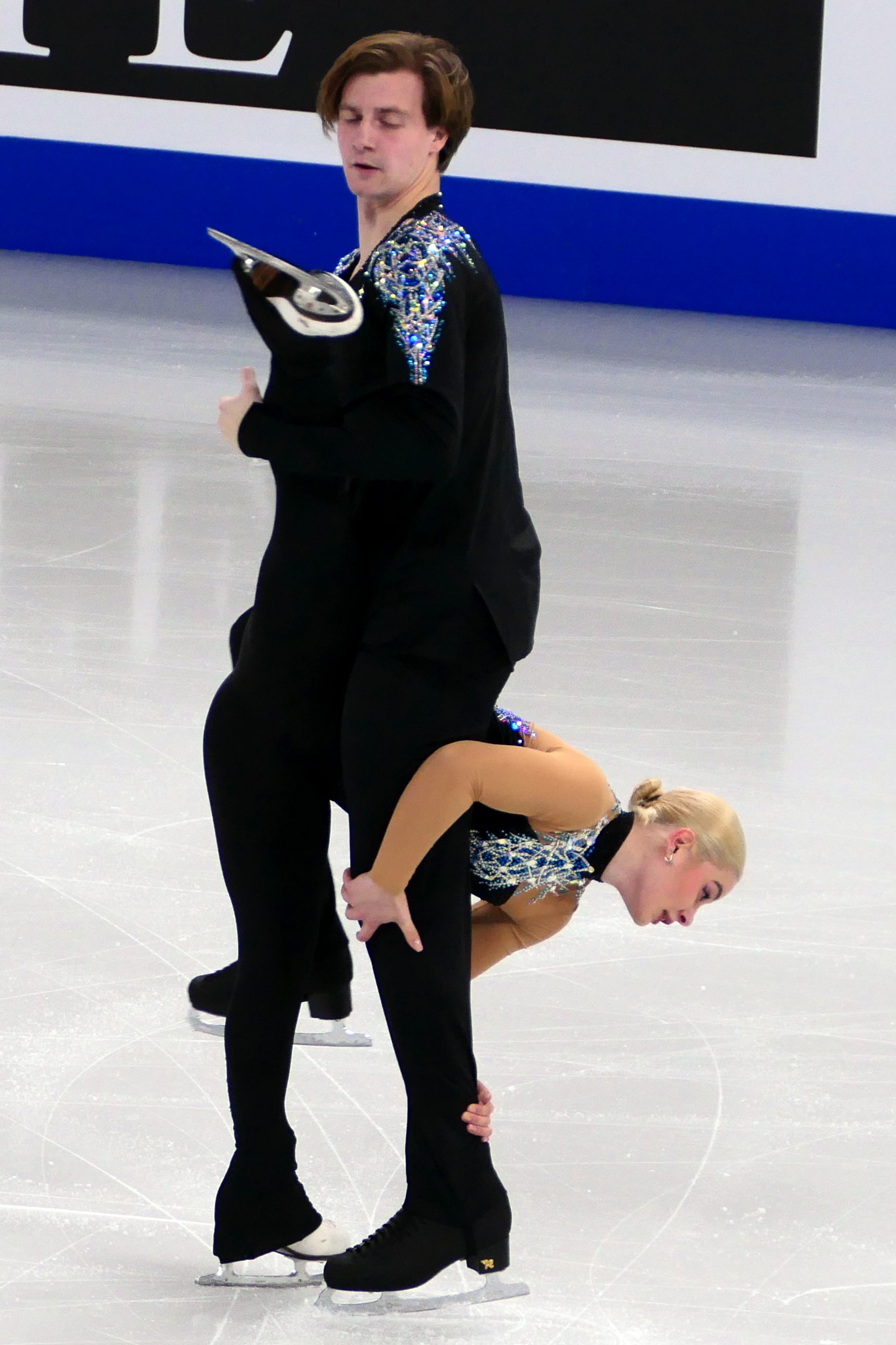
Holichenko and Darenskyi performing a pair spin during their free skate at the 2024 World Championships

=== 2023–24 season: Challenger Series bronze ===
In August 2023, it was announced that Holichenko/Darenskyi had switched coaches from Lilia Batutina to Ihor Marchenko.

Starting the season at the 2023 CS Nebelhorn Trophy, Holichenko/Darenskyi came in eighth place. At the 2023 CS Golden Spin of Zagreb, Holichenko/Darenskyi placed third in the short program and third in the free skate, placing third overall and earning their first ISU Challenger Series medal.

In the second half of the season, Holichenko/Darenskyi came eleventh at the 2024 European Championships and seventeenth at the 2024 World Championships.

=== 2024–25 season ===
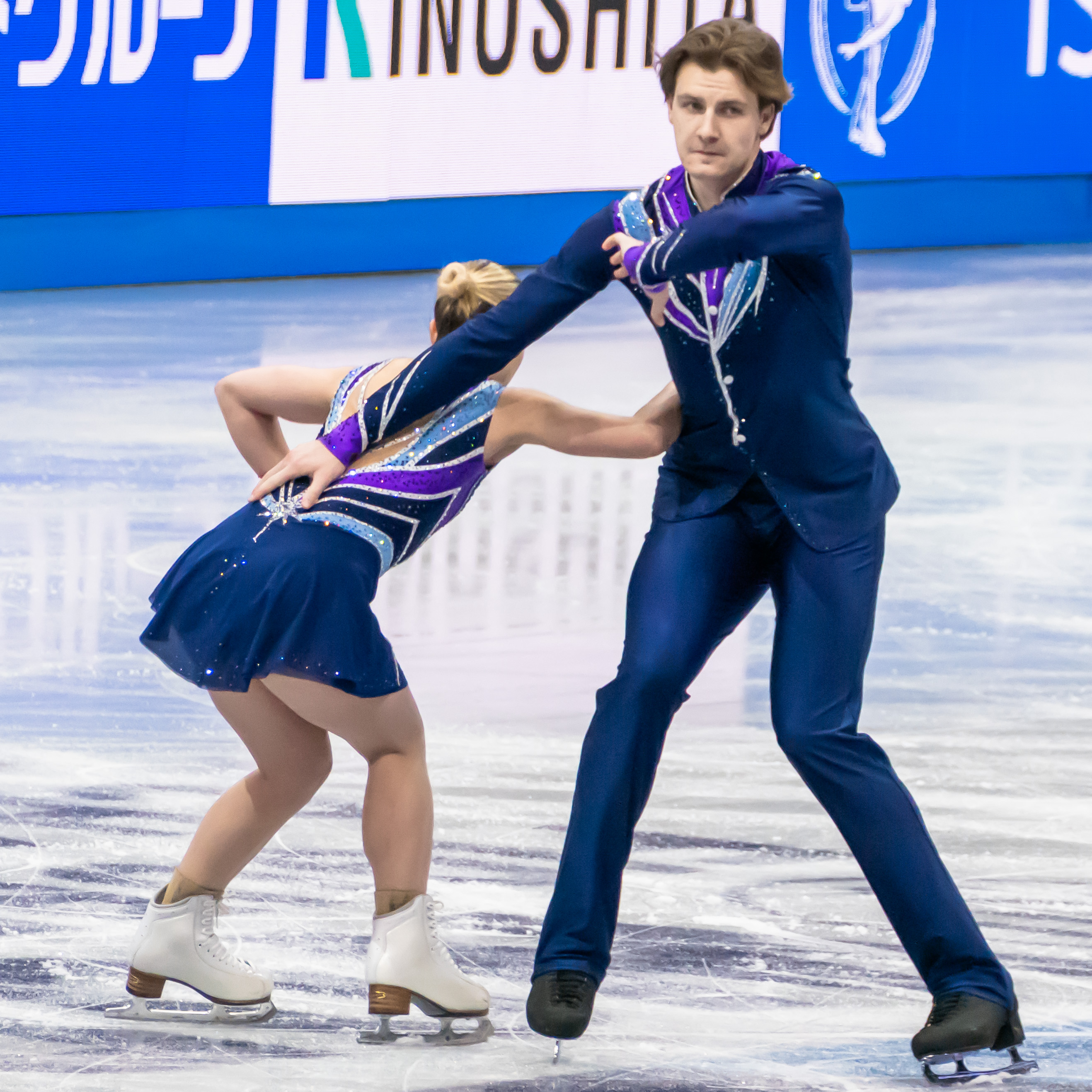
Holichenko and Darenskyi during their free skate at the 2025 World Championships

Due to the constant shelling taking place in Ukraine as a result of the ongoing war, Holichenko and Darenskyi had limited access to ice rinks where they could train in throughout the off-season. Their first competition of the season was on the 2024–25 ISU Junior Grand Prix circuit at the 2024 JGP Poland, where they won the silver medal.

Returning to the senior level, Holichenko/Darenskyi placed seventh at the 2024 CS Warsaw Cup. The pair then went on to compete at the 2025 European Championships in Tallinn, Estonia, where they placed eleventh. They subsequently won the bronze medal at the Road to 26 Trophy in Milan, Italy, a test event for the 2026 Winter Olympics.

They then represented Ukraine at the 2025 World Junior Championships, winning the silver medal. The team attributed their attendance at the junior championship to a desire to secure berths for Ukrainian pairs on the following season's junior circuit. “Well, we’re glad that we won this medal, but it was not our main target,” Darenskyi said. “Our main target was to secure the spots for Ukraine and the World Championships in Boston, where we hope to qualify. We hoped for the triple flip to work here, but maybe in Boston it will work.”

They closed the season by competing at the 2025 World Championships in Boston, Massachusetts, United States, where they finished in seventeenth place overall.

In April, Holichenko/Darenskyi's training rink in Kherson was destroyed by a Russian missile. Three people were injured and one person was killed from the impact.

=== 2025–26 season ===
Holichenko/Darenskyi opened their season with a sixth-place finish at the 2025 Lombardia Trophy. They then went on to finish fifth at the ISU Skate to Milano and twelfth at the 2025 CS Golden Spin of Zagreb.

Going into the 2026 European Championships, Holichenko/Darenskyi each dealt with injuries and losing their luggage at the airport upon arriving. Despite this, the pair still opted to compete at the event, finishing in sixteenth place.

== Programs ==
=== Pair skating with Sofiia Holichenko ===
Season	Short program	Free skating
2025–26	Sweet Dreams (Are Made of This) by Eurythmics & Annie Lennox choreo. by Nadezhda Yavir	Mad World by Tears for Fears performed by 2WEI, Tommee Profitt, & Fleurie choreo. by Nadezhda Yavir
2024–2025	Hit the Road Jack by Percy Mayfield performed by 2WEI & Bri Bryant choreo. by Nadezhda Yavir	Cosmic Love by Florence and the Machine choreo. by Nadezhda Yavir
2023–2024	Hit the Road Jack by Percy Mayfield performed by 2WEI & Bri Bryant choreo. by Nadezhda Yavir	Smells Like Teen Spirit by Nirvana performed by Malia J choreo. by Nadezhda Yavir
2022–2023	Zhiva (Alive) by Hardkiss choreo. by Ivan Lytvynenko	Smells Like Teen Spirit by Nirvana performed by Malia J; The Muse's Dance by Jo Blankenburg; Rise of the Phoenix by Jennifer Thomas; Macabracadabra by Jo Blankenburg choreo. by Ivan Lytvynenko
2021–2022	Zhiva (Alive) by Hardkiss choreo. by Ivan Lytvynenko; Pina by Thomas Hanreich; Lilies of the Valley (from Pina) by Jun Miyake choreo. by Ivan Lytvynenko	Men in Black 3 by Danny Elfman choreo. by Ivan Lytvynenko
2020–2021	Nuvole Bianche by Ludovico Einaudi choreo. by Ivan Lytvynenko	Men in Black 3 by Danny Elfman choreo. by Ivan Lytvynenko

=== Pair skating with Sofiia Nesterova ===
Season	Short program	Free skating
2019–2020	Don Juan by Félix Gray choreo. by Nadezhda Krasniak, Irina Voroninskaia	Braveheart by James Horner choreo. by Nadezhda Krasniak, Irina Voroninskaia
2018–2019	Dark Eyes choreo. by Lilia Batutina	Nerves at the Limit choreo. by Lilia Batutina
2017–2018	Dark Eyes choreo. by Yulia Horbacheva	Nerves at the Limit choreo. by Yulia Horbacheva

=== With Smirnova ===
Season	Short program	Free skating
2017–2018	Don Quixote by Ludwig Minkus choreo. by Yulia Horbacheva	The Nutcracker by Pyotr Ilyich Tchaikovsky choreo. by Yulia Horbacheva

== Competitive highlights ==
- JGP – Event of the ISU Junior Grand Prix Series
- CS – Event of the ISU Challenger Series
- TBD – Assigned
- WD – Withdrew from competition

=== Pair skating with Sofiia Holichenko ===
Competition placements at senior level
Season	2020–21	2021–22	2022–23	2023–24	2024–25	2025–26	2026–27
Winter Olympics (Team event)		10th					
World Championships		WD		17th	17th	18th	
European Championships		15th		11th	11th	16th	
Ukrainian Championships	2nd	1st	1st	1st			
GP Skate America							7th
GP Skate Canada							6th
CS Nebelhorn Trophy		11th	12th	8th			
CS Warsaw Cup					7th		
CS Trialeti Trophy							6th
CS Denis Ten Memorial		6th					
CS Lombardia Trophy						6th	
CS Golden Spin of Zagreb				3rd		12th	
Skate to Milano						5th	
Budapest Trophy		5th					
Road to 26 Trophy					3rd		

Competition placements at junior level
Season	2024–25
World Junior Championships	2nd
JGP Poland	2nd

=== Pair skating with Sofiia Nesterova ===
Competition placements at senior level
Season	2017–18	2018–19	2019–20
European Championships			DSQ
Ukrainian Championships	1st	1st	3rd
CS Golden Spin of Zagreb			19th
Volvo Open Cup			5th

Competition placements at junior level
Season	2017–18	2018–19	2019–20
Winter Youth Olympics			DSQ
Winter Youth Olympics (Team event)			3rd
World Junior Championships	14th	8th	
Ukrainian Championships	1st	1st	
JGP Austria		5th	
JGP Croatia			12th
JGP Czech Republic		8th	
JGP Poland			10th
Mentor Cup	3rd		

=== Pair skating with Anastasiia Smirnova ===
Competition placements at junior level
Season	2015–16	2016–17	2017–18
Ukrainian Championships	2nd	1st	
JGP Belarus			9th
JGP Latvia			11th

== Detailed results ==
=== Pair skating with Sofiia Holichenko ===
ISU personal best scores in the +5/-5 GOE System
Segment	Type	Score	Event
Total	TSS	169.41	2025 Skate to Milano
Short program	TSS	59.34	2024 World Championships
Short program	TES	33.64	2024 World Championships
Short program	PCS	25.70	2024 World Championships
Free skating	TSS	112.24	2025 Skate to Milano
Free skating	TES	59.50	2025 World Championships
Free skating	PCS	55.33	2025 European Championships

==== Senior level ====
Results in the 2020–21 season
Date	Event	SP		FS		Total	
Date	Event	P	Score	P	Score	P	Score
Feb 23–24, 2021	(Ukraine) 2021 Ukrainian Championships	2	48.39	2	88.51	2	136.90

Results in the 2021–22 season
Date	Event	SP		FS		Total	
Date	Event	P	Score	P	Score	P	Score
Sep 21–25, 2021	(Germany) 2021 CS Nebelhorn Trophy	10	52.63	10	89.75	11	142.38
Oct 14–17, 2021	(Hungary) 2021 Budapest Trophy	4	51.99	5	95.65	5	147.64
Oct 27–31, 2021	(Kazakhstan) 2021 CS Denis Ten Memorial Challenge	7	55.89	6	106.28	6	162.17
Dec 7–8, 2021	(Ukraine) 2022 Ukrainian Championships	1	49.58	1	92.45	1	142.03
Jan 10–16, 2022	(Estonia) 2022 European Championships	14	55.15	15	92.46	15	147.61
Feb 4–7, 2022	(China) 2022 Winter Olympics (Team event)	9	53.65	—N/a	—N/a	10	—N/a
Mar 21–27, 2022	(France) 2022 World Championships	13	44.95	—N/a	—N/a	–	WD

Results in the 2022–23 season
Date	Event	SP		FS		Total	
Date	Event	P	Score	P	Score	P	Score
Sep 21–24, 2022	(Germany) 2022 CS Nebelhorn Trophy	12	44.07	12	80.79	12	124.86
Apr 5–7, 2023	(Ukraine) 2023 Ukrainian Championships	1	—N/a	1	—N/a	1	—N/a

Results in the 2023–24 season
Date	Event	SP		FS		Total	
Date	Event	P	Score	P	Score	P	Score
Sep 20–23, 2023	(Germany) 2023 CS Nebelhorn Trophy	8	50.71	8	105.77	8	156.48
Dec 6–9, 2023	(Croatia) 2023 CS Golden Spin of Zagreb	3	55.92	3	106.25	3	162.17
Jan 8–14, 2024	(Lithuania) 2024 European Championships	12	52.95	10	101.42	11	154.37
Mar 18–24, 2024	(Canada) 2024 World Championships	16	59.34	18	100.05	17	159.39
Apr 4–6, 2024	(Ukraine) 2024 Ukrainian Championships	1	—N/a	1	—N/a	1	—N/a

Results in the 2024–25 season
Date	Event	SP		FS		Total	
Date	Event	P	Score	P	Score	P	Score
Nov 20–24, 2024	(Poland) 2024 CS Warsaw Cup	5	54.45	7	96.82	7	151.27
Jan 28 – Feb 2, 2025	(Estonia) 2025 European Championships	10	56.73	11	108.22	11	164.95
Feb 18–20, 2025	(Italy) Road to 26 Trophy	3	56.84	3	107.21	3	164.05
Mar 25–30, 2025	(United States) 2025 World Championships	17	57.20	17	111.35	17	168.55

Results in the 2025–26 season
Date	Event	SP		FS		Total	
Date	Event	P	Score	P	Score	P	Score
Sep 11–14, 2025	(Italy) 2025 Lombardia Trophy	6	44.88	5	90.89	6	135.77
Sep 18–21, 2025	(China) 2025 ISU Skate to Milano	6	57.17	4	112.24	5	169.41
Dec 3–6, 2025	(Croatia) 2025 CS Golden Spin of Zagreb	13	48.20	11	99.80	12	148.00
Jan 13–18, 2026	(United Kingdom) 2026 European Championships	16	42.32	16	84.46	16	126.78
Mar 24–29, 2026	(Czech Republic) 2026 World Championships	17	58.85	16	109.43	18	168.28

Results in the 2026-27 season
Date	Event	SP		FS		Total	
Date	Event	P	Score	P	Score	P	Score
Oct 1-4, 2026	(Georgia (country)) 2026 CS Trialeti Trophy	6	54.32	6	103.87	6	158.19
Oct 30 - Nov 1, 2026	2026 Skate Canada International	6	58.34	5	102.39	6	160.73
Nov 13-15, 2026	(United States) 2026 Skate America	7	58.54	7	99.24	7	157.78

==== Junior level ====
Results in the 2024–25 season
Date	Event	SP		FS		Total	
Date	Event	P	Score	P	Score	P	Score
Sep 25–28, 2024	2024 JGP Poland	2	51.81	5	84.77	2	136.58
Feb 25 – Mar 2, 2025	(Hungary) 2025 World Junior Championships	2	57.40	2	106.66	2	164.06
