= The Lone Ranger (soundtrack) =

2013 film soundtrack by Hans Zimmer

The Lone Ranger (Original Motion Picture Score) is the film score for the Walt Disney Pictures film, The Lone Ranger by Hans Zimmer, released on CD and digital download on July 2, 2013, by Walt Disney Records. The physical release was in association with Intrada Records.

Walt Disney Records also released a separate soundtrack and concept album titled, The Lone Ranger: Wanted (Music Inspired by the Film) by various artists on July 2.

== The Lone Ranger (Original Motion Picture Score) ==
The Lone Ranger (Original Motion Picture Score)

Film score by Hans Zimmer
- Released: July 2, 2013
- Length: 49:36
- Label: Walt Disney

Originally, Jack White was hired to compose the score for the film. White however, declined, and was replaced with Hans Zimmer.

All music is composed by Hans Zimmer excluding "Red's Theater of the Absurd", which was written by Jack White and "Finale", which is an extended arrangement of Gioachino Rossini's "William Tell Overture", with additional material arranged by Geoff Zanelli and Zimmer.

No.	Title	Length
1.	"Never Take Off the Mask"	1:08
2.	"Absurdity"	4:58
3.	"Silver"	4:00
4.	"Ride"	4:17
5.	"You've Looked Better"	3:09
6.	"Red's Theater of the Absurd" (performed by Pokey LaFarge & The South City Three)	3:02
7.	"The Railroad Waits for No One"	3:09
8.	"You're Just a Man in a Mask (Lone Ranger Theme)"	4:14
9.	"For God & Country"	4:53
10.	"Finale (Note: Titled "Finale (William Tell Overture)" for its YouTube release.)"	9:51
11.	"Home"	6:55
Total length:		49:36

== The Lone Ranger: Wanted (Music Inspired by the Film) ==
The Lone Ranger: Wanted (Music Inspired by the Film)

Soundtrack album by Various artists
- Released: July 2, 2013
- Genre: Outlaw country
- Length: 51:29
- Label: Walt Disney
- Producers: Gore Verbinski; Bruce Witkin; Jerry Bruckheimer; Mitchell Leib

Professional ratings
Review scores
Source	Rating
San Jose Mercury News	3/5 stars
USA Today	3.5/4 stars

Director Gore Verbinski, who also serves as the album's producer, described the compilation and roster as "...the artists we listened to on the way to set each morning and in the evenings with the dust, like bitter chalk, upon our teeth." Tracks by Grace Potter and The Nocturnals and Lucinda Williams were previewed on Rolling Stone and Billboard weeks before their official release.

No.	Title	Writer(s)	Artist	Length
1.	"Holy Water"	Ben Kweller	Ben Kweller	3:33
2.	"Devil's Train"	Mel Foree, Clifford Carlisle	Grace Potter and The Nocturnals	3:28
3.	"Poor Paddy on the Railway"	Traditional	Shane MacGowan	3:06
4.	"So Long Gone"	Pete Molinari	Pete Molinari	3:26
5.	"Central and Union"	Sara Watkins	Sara Watkins	2:58
6.	"American Dream"	Jake Smith	The White Buffalo	2:57
7.	"Lonesome Whistle"	Hank Williams, Sr., Jimmie Davis	Dave Alvin	4:12
8.	"Sweet Betsy from Pike" (Arranged by Johnny Depp, Bruce Witkin)	Traditional	Iggy Pop	4:00
9.	"Rattling Bone"	Sam Beam	Iron & Wine	4:47
10.	"Cowboy"	Izaac Margin, Elliott Margin, Samuel Margin, Scott Baldwin	The Rubens	2:53
11.	"Everything but the Truth"	Lucinda Williams	Lucinda Williams	4:02
12.	"The Truth Lives On"	Jesse Peter Wagner, Jeffrey Paul Roffredo, Roger Thomas Rivas	The Aggrolites	3:48
13.	"Butch's Ballad"	Benjamin Ottewell, Paul Blackburn, Ian Ball, Thomas Gray, Oliver Peacock	Gomez	5:37
14.	"Saddle the Wind"	Jay Livingston, Ray Evans	John Grant	2:42
Total length:				51:29

== See also ==
- Lone Ranger music
