= Alexander Shustitskiy =

Russian ice dancer (born 2002)

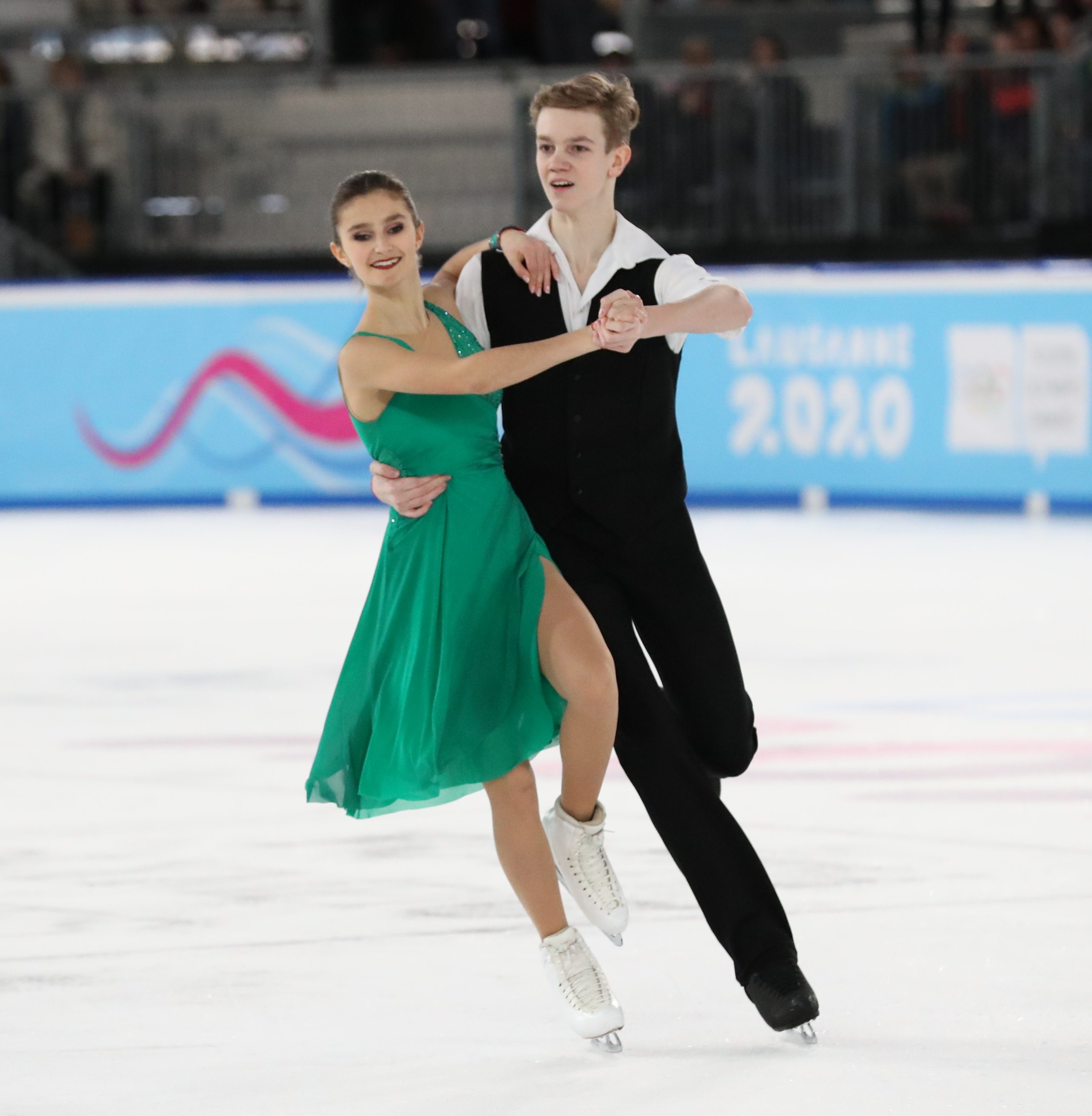
- Tyutyunina/Shustitskiy at the 2020 Winter Youth Olympics

Personal information
- Native name: Александр Николаевич Шустицкий (Russian)
- Full name: Alexander Nikolaevich Shustitskiy
- Other names: Aleksandr/Aleksander; Shustitskii/Shustitsky
- Born: 25 December 2002 (age 23) Moscow, Russia
- Home town: Moscow
- Height: 1.86 m (6 ft 1 in)

Figure skating career
- Country: Russia
- Partner: Alexandra Kravchenko
- Coach: Ekaterina Rubleva; Ivan Shefer
- Skating club: Sokolniki Sport School
- Began skating: 2007
Medal record
Figure skating: Ice dance
Representing Russia
Winter Youth Olympics
| Silver medal – second place | 2020 Lausanne | Ice dance |
Representing Mixed-NOCs
Winter Youth Olympics
| Silver medal – second place | 2020 Lausanne | Team |

Alexander Nikolaevich Shustitskiy (Russian: Александр Николаевич Шустицкий; born 25 December 2002) is a Russian ice dancer. With his former partner, Sofya Tyutyunina, he is the 2020 Youth Olympic silver medalist and a three-time ISU Junior Grand Prix medalist, including silver at 2019 JGP Croatia. They also won a silver medal in the team event at the 2020 Winter Youth Olympics.

== Personal life ==
Shustitskiy was born on 25 December 2002 in Moscow.

== Career ==
=== Early career ===
Shustitskiy began skating in 2007. He skated for two seasons with Ekaterina Isaicheva in 2011–12 and 2012–13.

Shustitskiy teamed up with Sofya Tyutyunina in May 2013. At the NRW Trophy, they won basic novice gold in 2013 and silver in 2014. Tyutyunina/Shustitskiy are also the 2015 Volvo Open Cup bronze medalists and the 2016 NRW Trophy silver medalists on the advanced novice level.

Tyutyunina/Shustitskiy qualified to their first Russian Junior Championships in 2018, placing 14th. They did not compete internationally in 2018–19, but competed at the 2019 Russian Junior Championships, placing eighth.

=== 2019–20 season ===
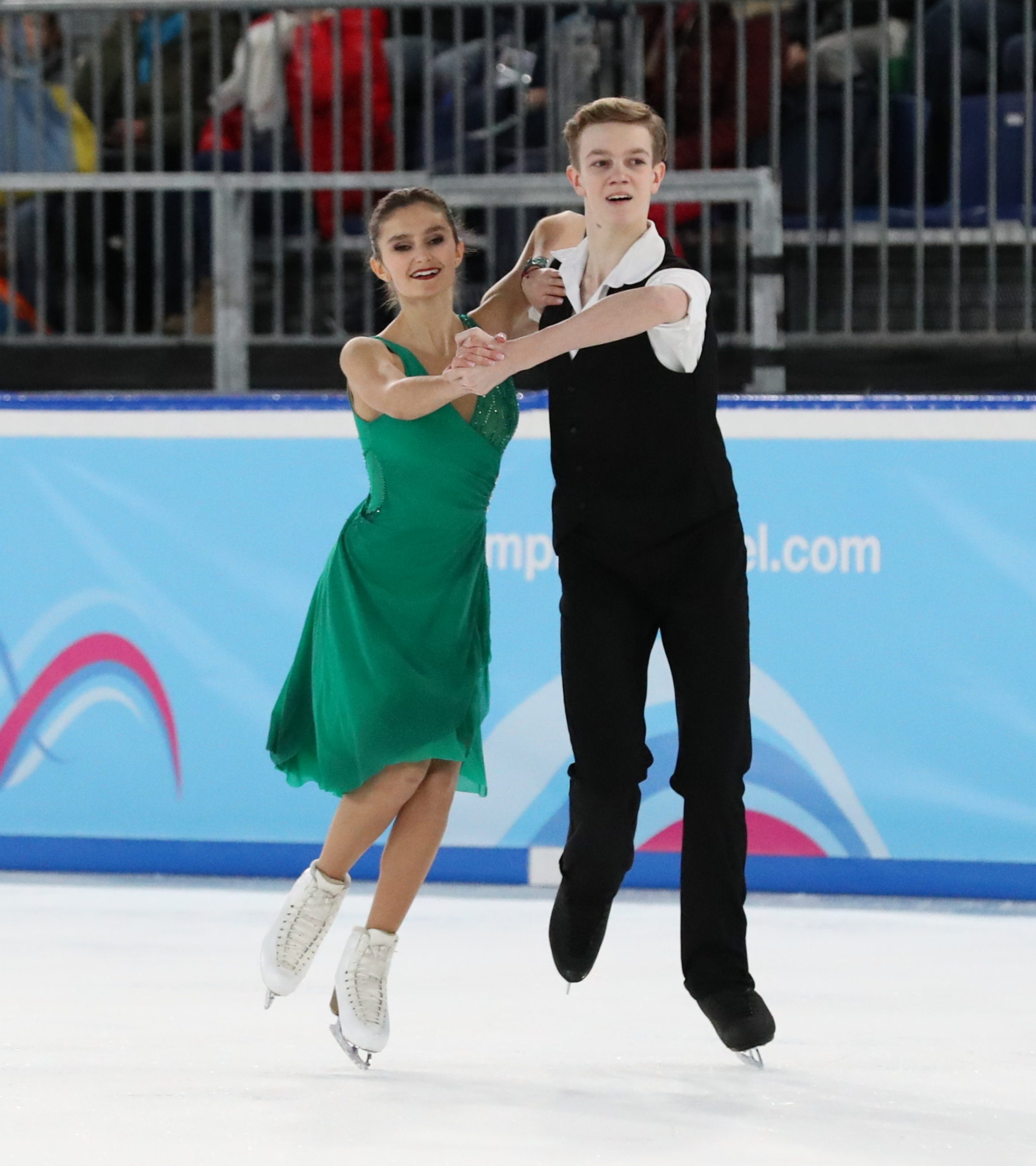
Tyutyunina/Shustitskiy at the 2020 Winter Youth Olympics

Tyutyunina/Shustitskiy received their first Junior Grand Prix assignments, their first international appearances since a fifth-place finish at the 2017 Santa Claus Cup. At their first event in Latvia, they were fourth after the rhythm dance but placed third in the free dance to move up to third overall, narrowly winning the bronze medal by 0.67 points over Canada's Natalie D'Alessandro / Bruce Waddell. Tyutyunina/Shustitskiy were the silver medalists at their second event, JGP Croatia, nearly 15 points behind champions Maria Kazakova / Georgy Reviya of Georgia, who had also placed ahead of them in Latvia. Their results qualified them as first alternates to the 2019–20 Junior Grand Prix Final.

In January, Tyutyunina/Shustitskiy represented Russia at the 2020 Winter Youth Olympics in Lausanne, Switzerland. They were second in both segments of the competition to win the silver medal behind teammates Irina Khavronina / Dario Cirisano and ahead of Americans Katarina Wolfkostin / Jeffrey Chen. Tyutyunina/Shustiskiy said they enjoyed the atmosphere created by the large crowd, composed primarily of local children, and called it a "very special" experience for them. During the team event, they were second individually behind Utana Yoshida / Shingo Nishiyama to help Team Focus (Yuma Kagiyama of Japan, Kate Wang of the United States, and Cate Fleming / Jedidiah Isbell of the United States) win the silver medal.

At the 2020 Russian Junior Championships in February, Tyutyunina/Shustitskiy were sixth in the rhythm dance and fifth in the free dance to finish fifth overall. As a result of their placement, they were named second alternates for the 2020 World Junior Championships.

=== 2020–21 season ===
Due to the COVID-19 pandemic, the Junior Grand Prix, where Tyutyunina/Shustitskiy would have competed, was cancelled. They instead competed in several domestic competitions over the first half of the season. Tyutyunina/Shustiskiy were unable to compete at the 2021 Russian Junior Championships in February after Tyutyunina fractured her leg in December.

=== 2021–22 season ===
With the resumption of the Junior Grand Prix, Tyutyunina/Shustitskiy competed at 2021 JGP Slovakia in Košice, where they placed third in both segments to win the bronze medal. They went on to win the 2021 JGP Austria, winning both segments of the competition.

In May, it was announced that the duo had split.

=== 2022-23 season ===
In July, it was announced that he had paired with Alexandra Kravchenko.

== Programs ==
With Tyutyunina

| Season | Rhythm dance | Free dance |
|---|---|---|
| 2021–2022 | Blues: Do I Wanna Know? by Arctic Monkeys; Losing Your Mind (from The Get Down) by Raury & Jaden Smith choreo. by Sergei Plishkin, Ekaterina Vinogradova | Babe I'm Gonna Leave You by Anne Bredon performed by Led Zeppelin choreo. by Sergei Plishkin, Ekaterina Vinogradova |
| 2019–2020 | Foxtrot: City of Stars; Quickstep: Another Day of Sun (from La La Land) by Justin Hurwitz choreo. by Sergin Plishkin, Ekaterina Vinogradova | Turning Page (from The Twilight Saga: Breaking Dawn – Part 1) by Sleeping at Last choreo. by Sergin Plishkin, Ekaterina Vinogradova |
| 2018–2019 | Tango Gosselin by Quadro Nuevo choreo. by Sergin Plishkin, Ekaterina Vinogradova | Time of the Season; She's Not There by The Zombies choreo. by Sergin Plishkin, Ekaterina Vinogradova |

== Competitive highlights ==
JGP: Junior Grand Prix

=== With Kravchenko ===
National
| Event | 22–23 |
|---|---|
| Russian Champ. | 7th |
| GPR Idel | 5th |
| GPR Perm Territory | 3rd |

=== With Tyutyunina ===
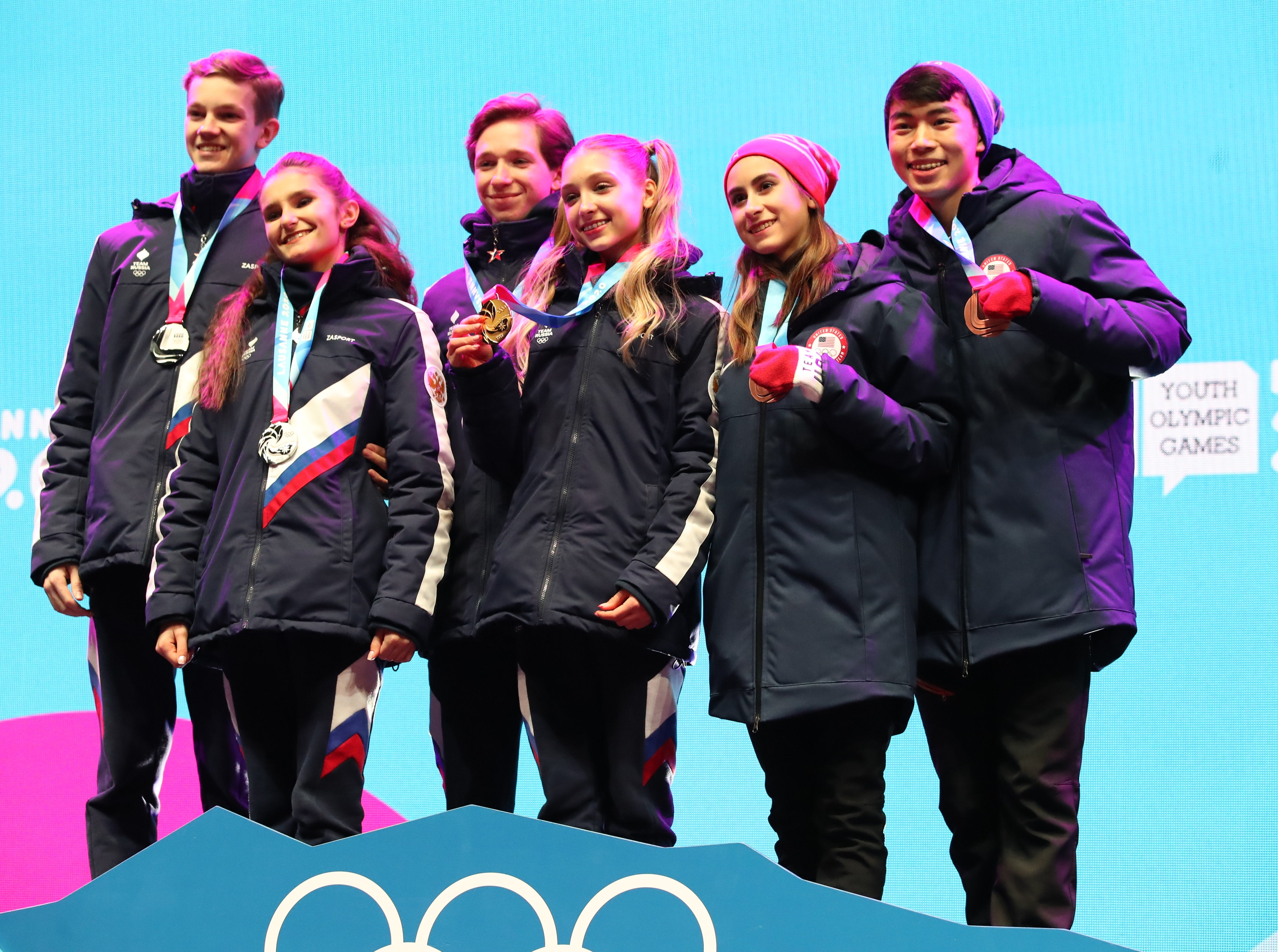
Tyutyunina/Shustitskiy (left) on the podium at the 2020 Winter Youth Olympics

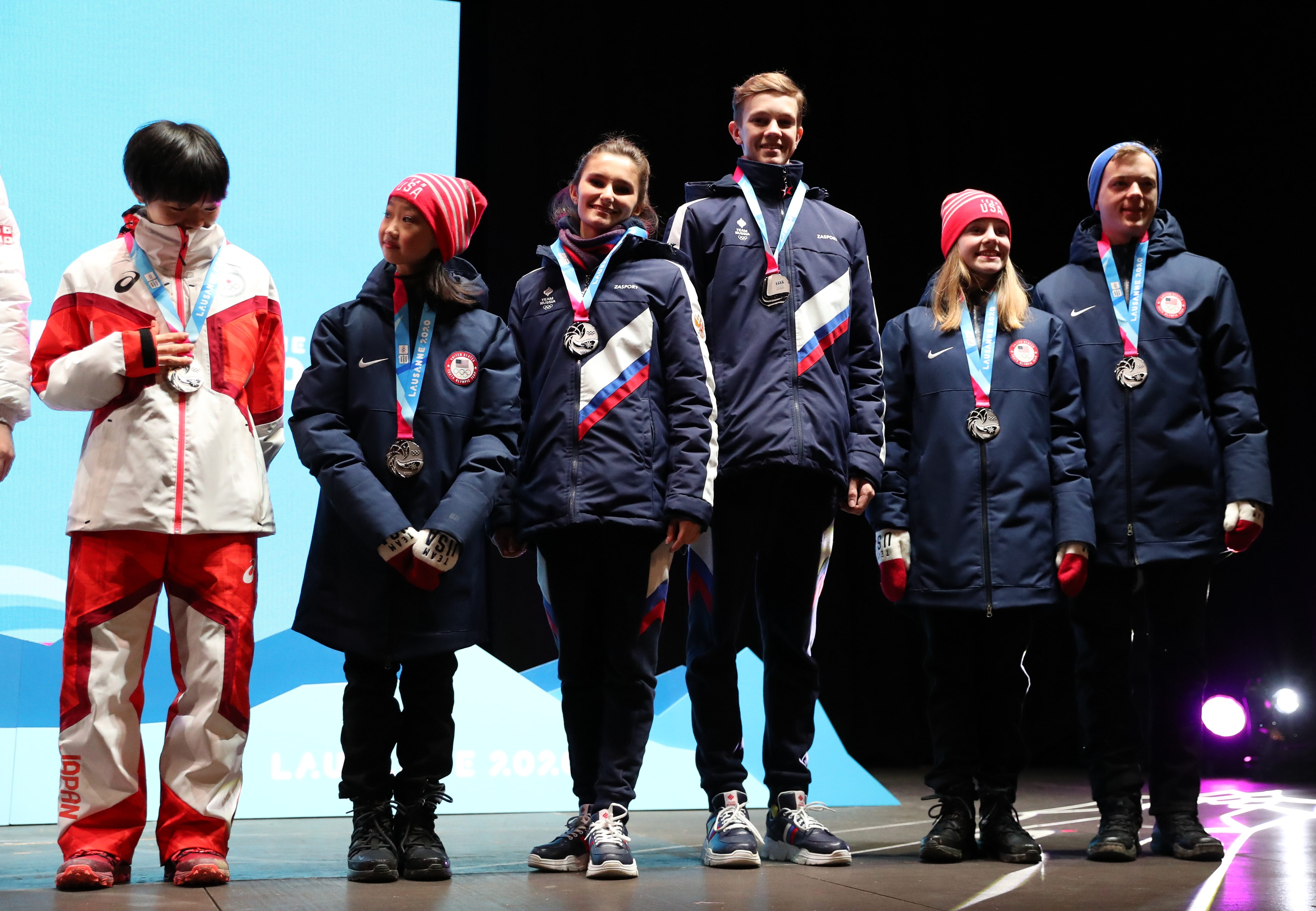
Tyutyunina/Shustitskiy (center) on the team podium at the 2020 Winter Youth Olympics

International: Junior
| Event | 17–18 | 18–19 | 19–20 | 21–22 |
|---|---|---|---|---|
| Youth Olympics | | | 2nd | |
| JGP Austria | | | | 1st |
| JGP Croatia | | | 2nd | |
| JGP Latvia | | | 3rd | |
| JGP Slovakia | | | | 3rd |
| Santa Claus Cup | 5th | | | |
National
| Russian Junior | 14th | 8th | 5th | 3rd |
Team events
| Youth Olympics | | | 2nd T 2nd P | |
WD = Withdrew; T = Team result; P = Personal result. Medals awarded for team result only.

== Detailed results ==
ISU Personal Bests highlighted in bold.

=== With Tyutyunina ===
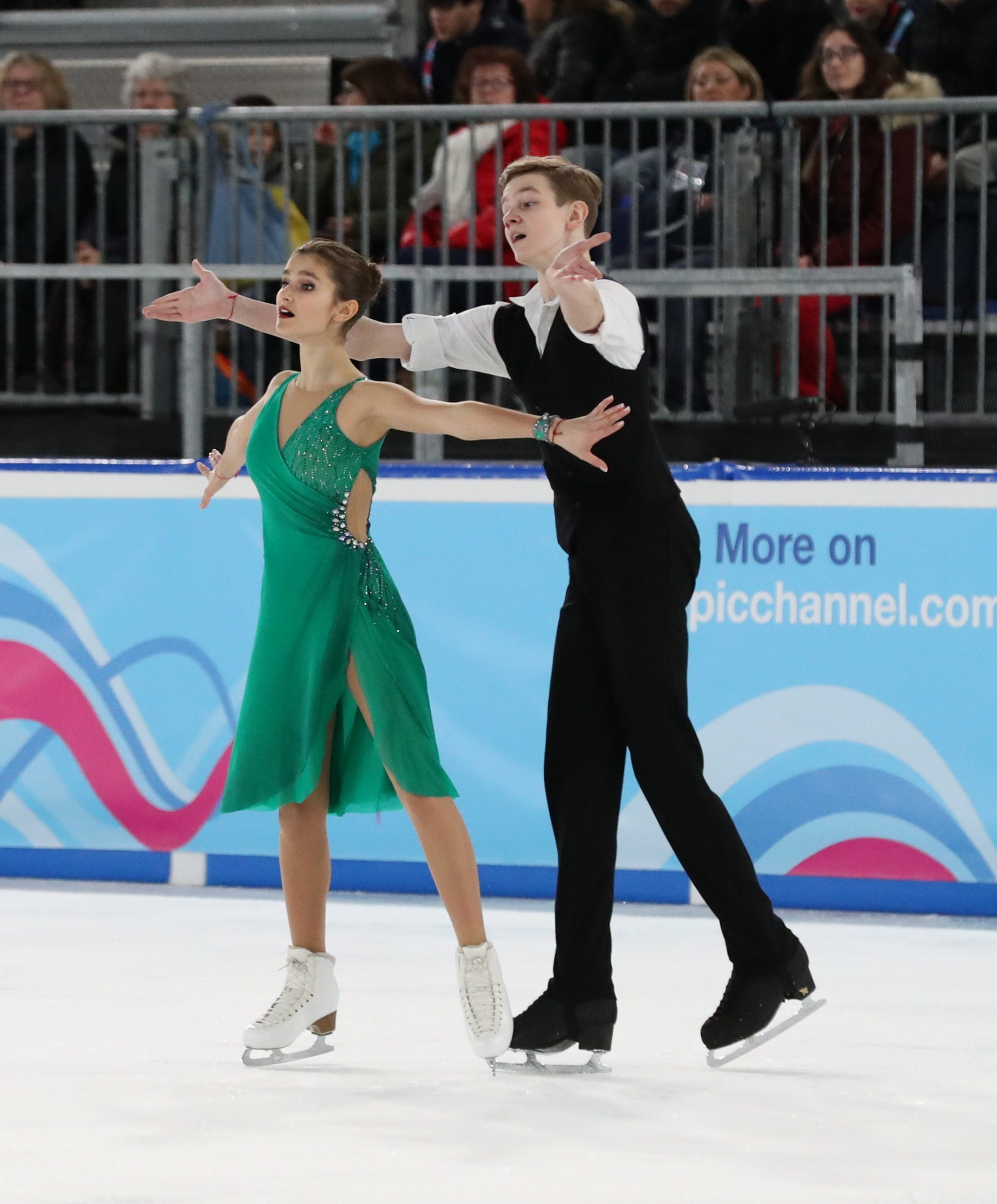
Tyutyunina/Shustitskiy at the 2020 Winter Youth Olympics

==== Junior results ====
2021–22 season
| Date | Event | RD | FD | Total |
|---|---|---|---|---|
| 18–22 January 2022 | 2022 Russian Junior Championships | 2; 72.81 | TBD | TBD |
| 6–9 October 2021 | 2021 JGP Austria | 1; 67.00 | 1; 95.28 | 1; 162.28 |
| 1–4 September 2021 | 2021 JGP Slovakia | 3; 63.10 | 3; 92.88 | 3; 155.98 |
2019–20 season
| Date | Event | RD | FD | Total |
| 4–8 February 2020 | 2020 Russian Junior Championships | 6; 63.91 | 5; 102.50 | 5; 166.41 |
| 10–15 January 2020 | 2020 Winter Youth Olympics – Team | – | 2; 96.39 | 2T/2P |
| 10–15 January 2020 | 2020 Winter Youth Olympics | 2; 62.64 | 2; **96.51** | 2; **159.15** |
| 25–28 September 2019 | 2019 JGP Croatia | 2; **64.34** | 3; 90.05 | 2; 154.39 |
| 4–7 September 2019 | 2019 JGP Latvia | 4; 60.82 | 3; 91.97 | 3; 152.79 |
2018–19 season
| Date | Event | RD | FD | Total |
| 31 Jan. – 4 Feb. 2019 | 2019 Russian Junior Championships | 10; 59.83 | 8; 94.86 | 8; 154.69 |
2017–18 season
| Date | Event | SD | FD | Total |
| 23–26 January 2018 | 2018 Russian Junior Championships | 8; 56.88 | 15; 67.42 | 14; 124.30 |
| 4–10 December 2017 | 2017 Santa Claus Cup | 5; 50.63 | 6; 70.83 | 5; 121.46 |
