= Sofya Tyutyunina =

Russian ice dancer (born 2003)

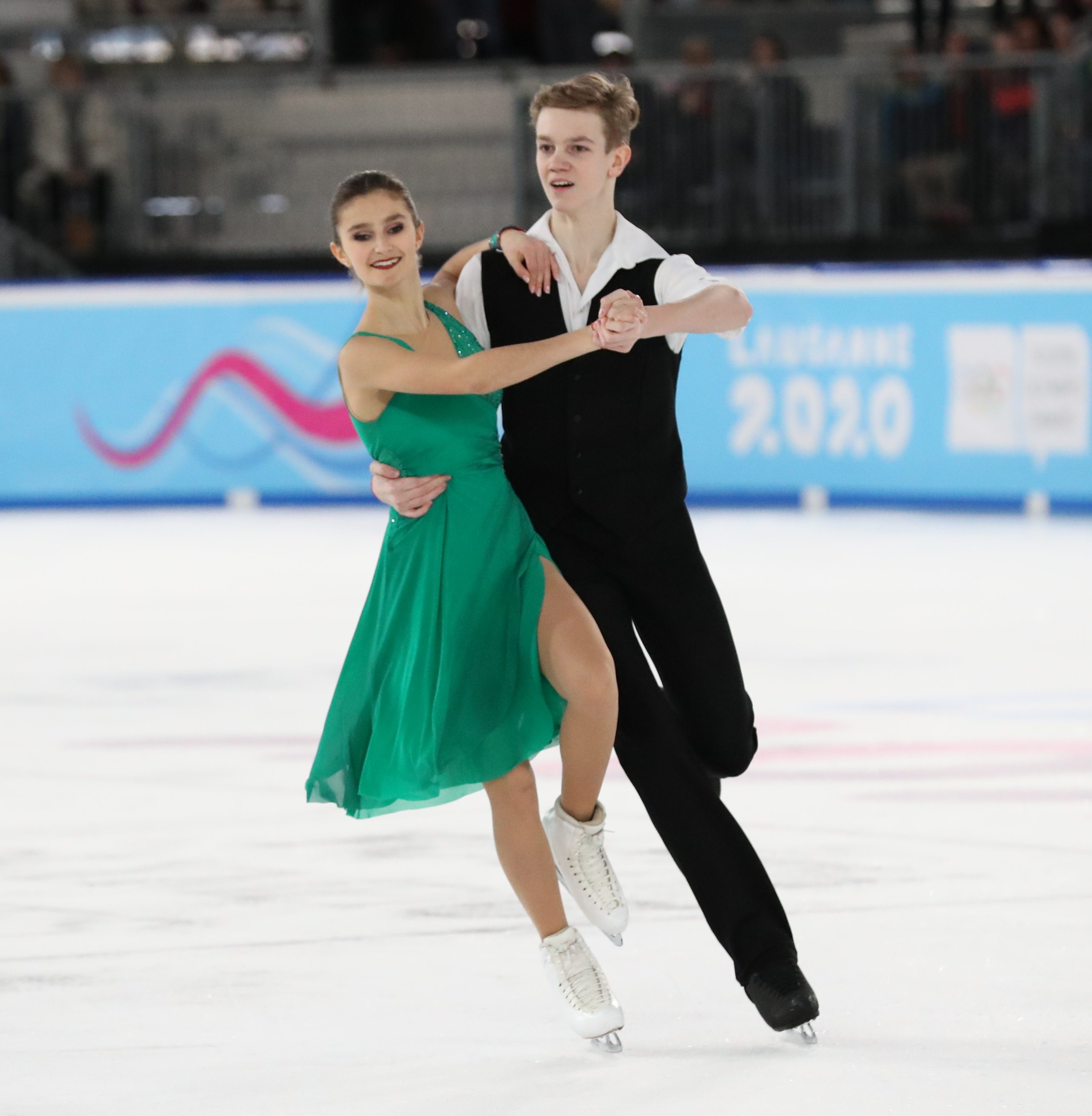
- Tyutyunina/Shustitskiy at the 2020 Winter Youth Olympics

Personal information
- Native name: Софья Александровна Тютюнина (Russian)
- Full name: Sofya Alexandrovna Tyutyunina
- Other names: Sofia
- Born: 13 June 2003 (age 23) Moscow, Russia
- Home town: Moscow
- Height: 1.64 m (5 ft 4 1/2 in)

Figure skating career
- Country: Russia
- Coach: Alexander Zhulin, Petr Durnev, Sergei Petushkov
- Skating club: Sokolniki Sport School
- Began skating: 2007
Medal record
Figure skating: Ice dance
Representing Russia
Winter Youth Olympics
Silver medal – second place	2020 Lausanne	Ice dance
Representing Mixed-NOCs
Winter Youth Olympics
Silver medal – second place	2020 Lausanne	Team

Sofya Alexandrovna Tyutyunina (Russian: Софья Александровна Тютюнина; born 13 June 2003) is a Russian ice dancer. With her former skating partner, Alexander Shustitskiy, she is the 2020 Youth Olympic silver medalist and a three-time ISU Junior Grand Prix medalist, including silver at 2019 JGP Croatia. They also won a silver medal in the team event at the 2020 Winter Youth Olympics.

== Personal life ==
Tyutyunina was born on 13 June 2003 in Moscow. She enjoys reading, drawing, and web design.

== Career ==
=== Early career ===
Tyutyunina began skating in 2007. She originally trained under Natalia Maryanski.

Tyutyunina teamed up with Alexander Shustitskiy to compete in ice dance in May 2013. At the NRW Trophy, they won basic novice gold in 2013 and silver in 2014. Tyutyunina/Shustitskiy are also the 2015 Volvo Open Cup bronze medalists and the 2016 NRW Trophy silver medalists on the advanced novice level.

Tyutyunina/Shustitskiy qualified to their first Russian Junior Championships in 2018, placing 14th. They did not compete internationally in 2018–19, but competed at the 2019 Russian Junior Championships, placing eighth.

=== 2019–20 season ===
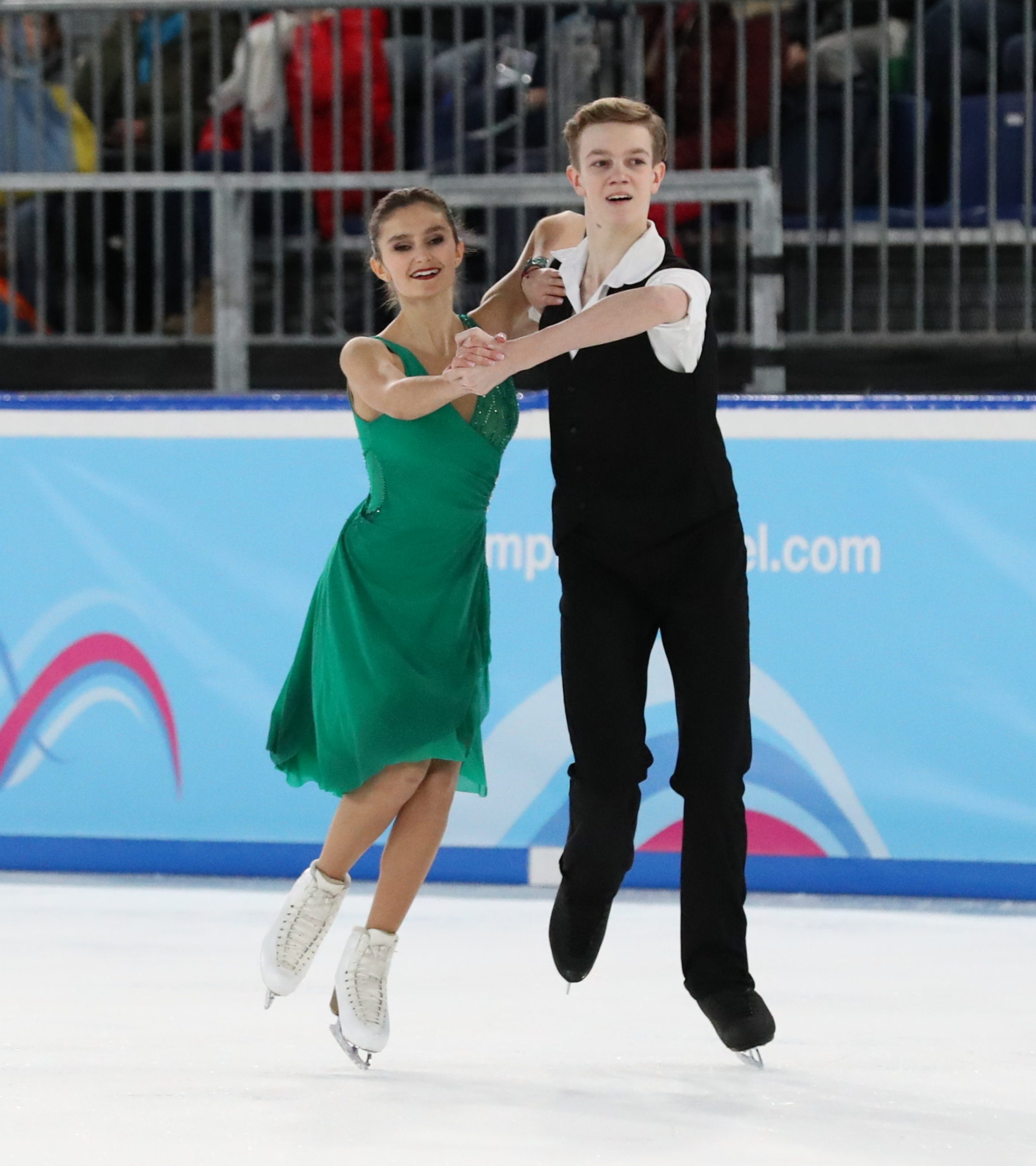
Tyutyunina/Shustitskiy at the 2020 Winter Youth Olympics

Tyutyunina/Shustitskiy received their first Junior Grand Prix assignments, their first international appearances since a fifth-place finish at the 2017 Santa Claus Cup. At their first event in Latvia, they were fourth after the rhythm dance but placed third in the free dance to move up to third overall, narrowly winning the bronze medal by 0.67 points over Canada's Natalie D'Alessandro / Bruce Waddell. Tyutyunina/Shustitskiy were the silver medalists at their second event, JGP Croatia, nearly 15 points behind champions Maria Kazakova / Georgy Reviya of Georgia, who had also placed ahead of them in Latvia. Their results qualified them as first alternates to the 2019–20 Junior Grand Prix Final.

In January, Tyutyunina/Shustitskiy represented Russia at the 2020 Winter Youth Olympics in Lausanne, Switzerland. They were second in both segments of the competition to win the silver medal behind teammates Irina Khavronina / Dario Cirisano and ahead of Americans Katarina Wolfkostin / Jeffrey Chen. Tyutyunina/Shustiskiy said they enjoyed the atmosphere created by the large crowd, composed primarily of local children, and called it a "very special" experience for them. During the team event, they were second individually behind Utana Yoshida / Shingo Nishiyama to help Team Focus (Yuma Kagiyama of Japan, Kate Wang of the United States, and Cate Fleming / Jedidiah Isbell of the United States) win the silver medal.

At the 2020 Russian Junior Championships in February, Tyutyunina/Shustitskiy were sixth in the rhythm dance and fifth in the free dance to finish fifth overall. As a result of their placement, they were named second alternates for the 2020 World Junior Championships.

=== 2020–21 season ===
Due to the COVID-19 pandemic, the Junior Grand Prix, where Tyutyunina/Shustitskiy would have competed, was cancelled. They instead competed in several domestic competitions over the first half of the season. Tyutyunina/Shustitskiy could not compete at the 2021 Russian Junior Championships in February after Tyutyunina fractured her leg in December.

=== 2021–22 season ===
With the resumption of the Junior Grand Prix, Tyutyunina/Shustitskiy competed at 2021 JGP Slovakia in Košice, where they placed third in both segments to win the bronze medal.

Tyutyunina/Shustitskiy ended their partnership at the beginning of May 2022. On 17 May, it was announced that Tyutyunina had teamed up with Andrei Bagin, coached by Alexander Zhulin.

== Programs ==
=== With Grachev ===
Season	Rhythm dance	Free dance
2023–2024	I Want to Break Free by Queen; Material Girl by Madonna	My Love; The Devil You Know; 50 Shades of Black by Sharon Kovacs
2022–2023	River by Ibeyi	Piano Concerto No. 2 by Sergei Rachmaninoff

=== With Shustitskiy ===
Season	Rhythm dance	Free dance
2021–2022	Blues: Do I Wanna Know? by Arctic Monkeys; Losing Your Mind (from The Get Down) by Raury & Jaden Smith choreo. by Sergei Plishkin, Ekaterina Vinogradova	Babe I'm Gonna Leave You by Anne Bredon performed by Led Zeppelin choreo. by Sergei Plishkin, Ekaterina Vinogradova
2019–2020	Foxtrot: City of Stars; Quickstep: Another Day of Sun (from La La Land) by Justin Hurwitz choreo. by Sergin Plishkin, Ekaterina Vinogradova	Turning Page (from The Twilight Saga: Breaking Dawn – Part 1) by Sleeping at Last choreo. by Sergin Plishkin, Ekaterina Vinogradova
2018–2019	Tango Gosselin by Quadro Nuevo choreo. by Sergin Plishkin, Ekaterina Vinogradova	Time of the Season; She's Not There by The Zombies choreo. by Sergin Plishkin, Ekaterina Vinogradova

== Competitive highlights ==
JGP: Junior Grand Prix

=== With Grachev ===
National
Event	23–24	24–25
Russian Champ.	7th	WD

=== With Bagin ===
National
Event	2022–23
Russian Champ.	4th
Russian Cup Final (Note: The 2023 Russian Cup Final was renamed as the 2023 Russian Grand Prix Final.)	3rd
GPR Moscow Stars	2nd
GPR Perm Territory	1st

=== With Shustitskiy ===
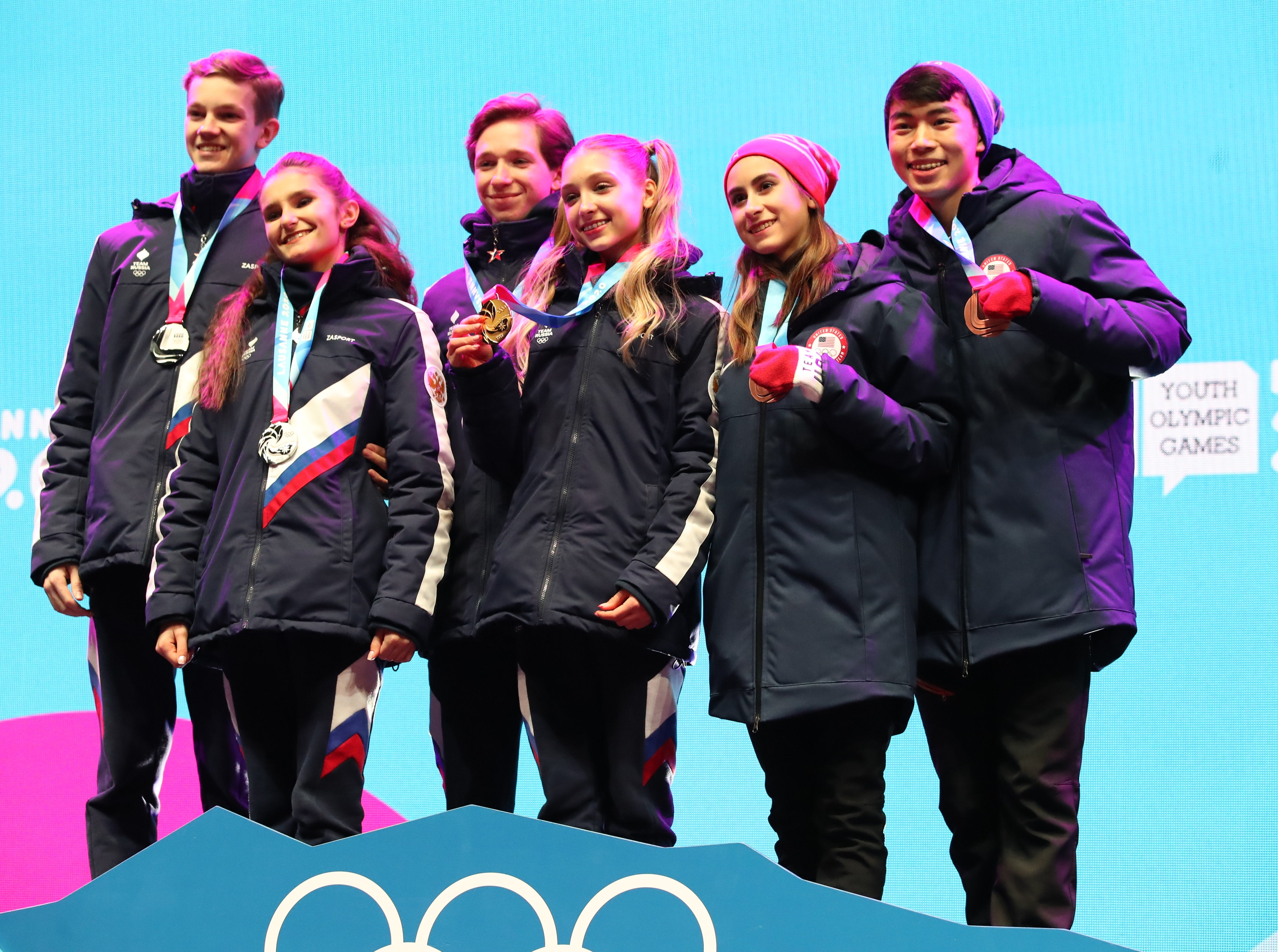
Tyutyunina/Shustitskiy (left) on the podium at the 2020 Winter Youth Olympics

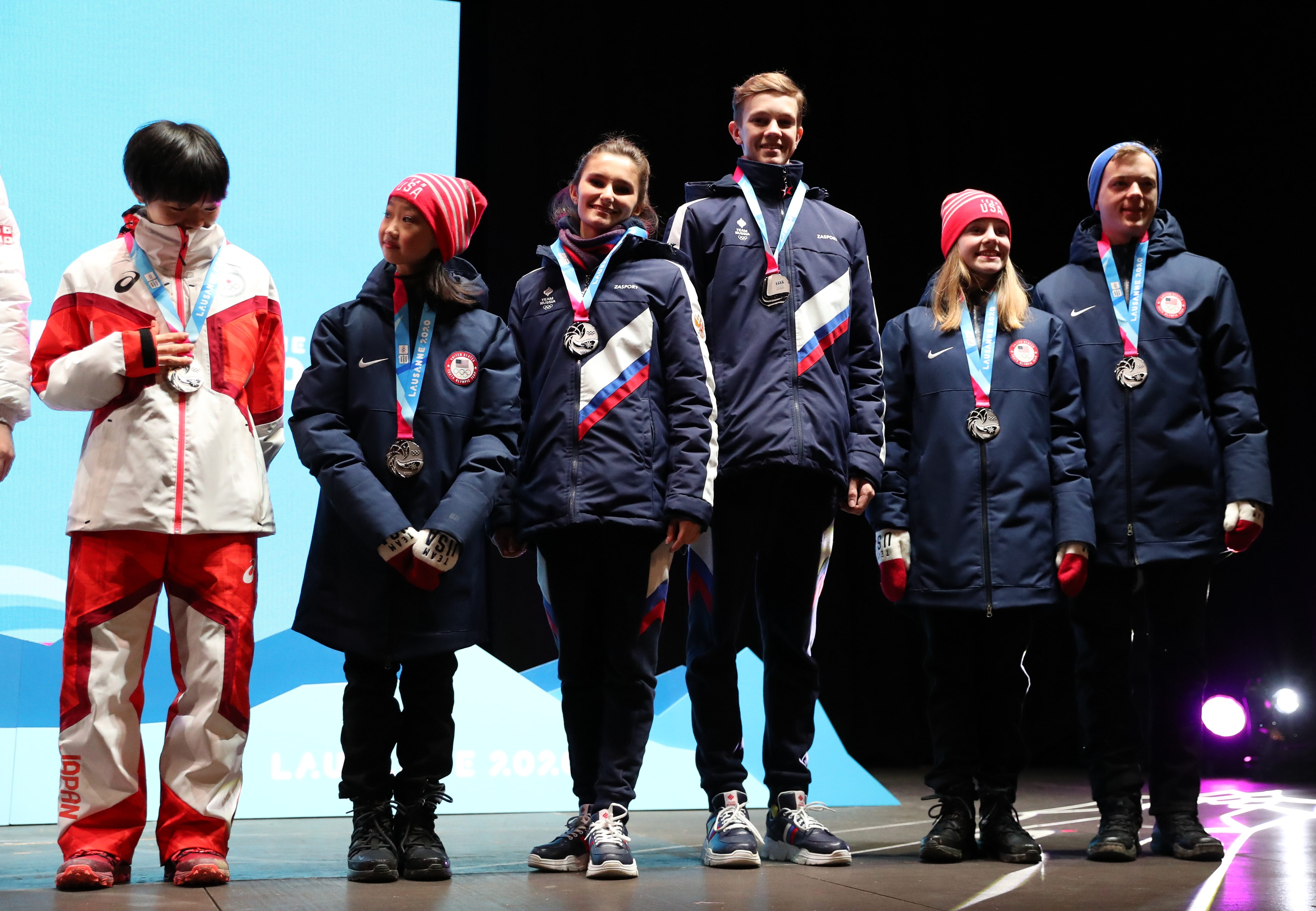
Tyutyunina/Shustitskiy (center) on the team podium at the 2020 Winter Youth Olympics

International: Junior
Event	15–16	16–17	17–18	18–19	19–20	20–21	21–22
Youth Olympics					2nd		
JGP Final							C
JGP Austria							1st
JGP Croatia					2nd		
JGP Latvia					3rd		
JGP Slovakia							3rd
Santa Claus Cup			5th				
International: Advanced novice
NRW Trophy		2nd					
Volvo Open Cup	3rd						
National
Russian Junior			14th	8th	5th	WD	3rd
Team events
Youth Olympics					2nd T 2nd P		
WD = Withdrew; T = Team result; P = Personal result. Medals awarded for team result only.

== Detailed results ==
ISU Personal Bests highlighted in bold.

=== With Shustitskiy ===
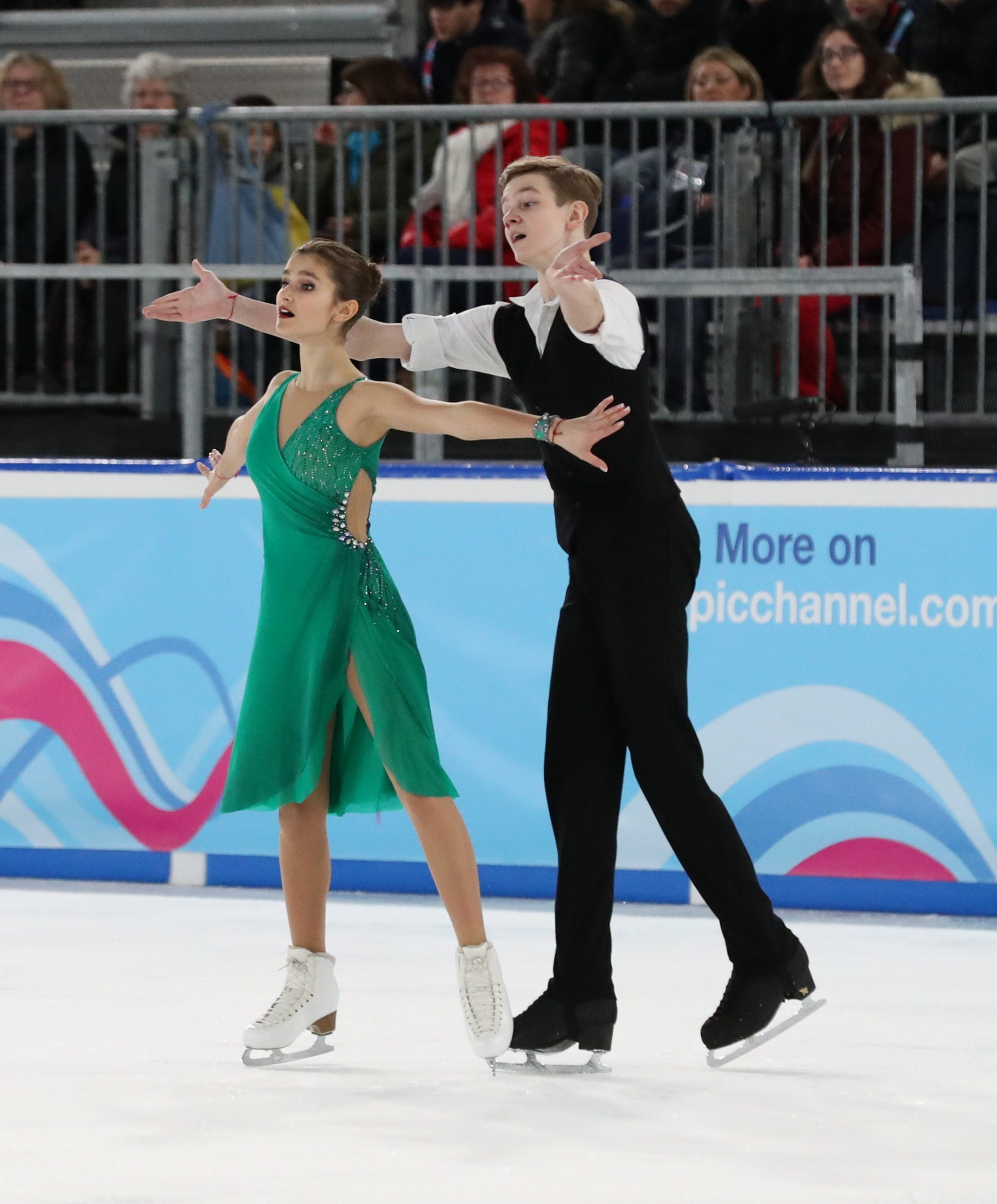
Tyutyunina/Shustitskiy at the 2020 Winter Youth Olympics

==== Junior results ====
2021–22 season
Date	Event	RD	FD	Total
18–22 January 2022	2022 Russian Junior Championships	2; 72.81	4; 105.31	3; 178.12
6–9 October 2021	2021 JGP Austria	1; 67.00	1; 95.28	1; 162.28
1–4 September 2021	2021 JGP Slovakia	3; 63.10	3; 92.88	3; 155.98
2019–20 season
Date	Event	RD	FD	Total
4–8 February 2020	2020 Russian Junior Championships	6; 63.91	5; 102.50	5; 166.41
10–15 January 2020	2020 Winter Youth Olympics – Team	–	2; 96.39	2T/2P
10–15 January 2020	2020 Winter Youth Olympics	2; 62.64	2; **96.51**	2; **159.15**
25–28 September 2019	2019 JGP Croatia	2; **64.34**	3; 90.05	2; 154.39
4–7 September 2019	2019 JGP Latvia	4; 60.82	3; 91.97	3; 152.79
2018–19 season
Date	Event	RD	FD	Total
31 Jan. – 4 Feb. 2019	2019 Russian Junior Championships	10; 59.83	8; 94.86	8; 154.69
2017–18 season
Date	Event	SD	FD	Total
23–26 January 2018	2018 Russian Junior Championships	8; 56.88	15; 67.42	14; 124.30
4–10 December 2017	2017 Santa Claus Cup	5; 50.63	6; 70.83	5; 121.46
