= Dario Cirisano =

Russian ice dancer (born 2001)

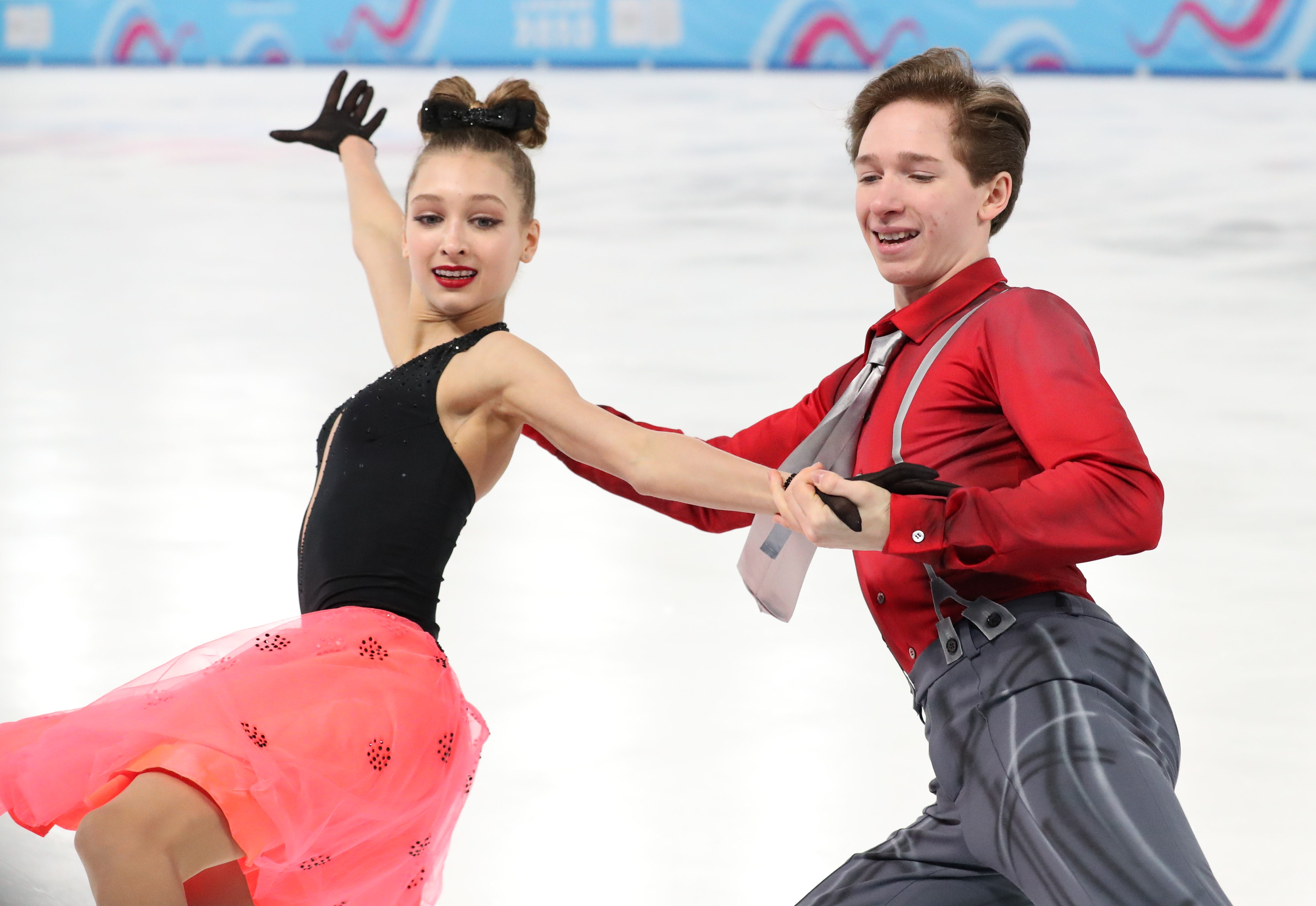
- Khavronina / Cirisano at the 2020 Winter Youth Olympics

Personal information
- Native name: Дарио Чиризано
- Full name: Dario Cirisano
- Other names: Dario Chirizano
- Born: 12 June 2001 (age 25) Crotone, Italy
- Home town: Odintsovo, Russia
- Height: 1.74 m (5 ft 8 1/2 in)

Figure skating career
- Country: (Individual Neutral Athletes) Individual Neutral Athlete; Russia
- Partner: Elizaveta Pasechnik
- Coach: Angelika Krylova
- Skating club: UOR No. 1 Odintsovo
- Began skating: 2006
Medal record
Representing Russia
Figure skating: Ice dance
Winter Youth Olympics
Gold medal – first place	2020 Lausanne	Ice dance
Russian Championships
Bronze medal – third place	2026 Saint Petersburg	Ice dance

Dario Cirisano (Russian: Дарио Чиризано, born 12 June 2001) is a Russian ice dancer who currently competes as an Individual Neutral Athlete. With partner, Elizaveta Pasechnik, he is the 2026 Russian national bronze medalist.

With his former skating partner, Irina Khavronina, he is the 2020 Youth Olympic champion and 2022 Russian junior champion.

== Personal life ==
Cirisano was born on 12 June 2001 in Crotone, Italy, but moved to St. Petersburg in 2006. His father, Benito, is Italian, and he has an older sister, Valeria.

== Career ==
=== Early years ===
Cirisano began learning to skate as a five-year-old in 2006. He began competing in ice dance during the 2016–17 season, skating with Marina Tikhonova. Their partnership lasted two seasons.

In 2018, Cirisano teamed up with Irina Khavronina. The two finished 11th at the 2019 Russian Junior Figure Skating Championships.

=== 2019–20 season: Junior international debut ===
Khavronina/Cirisano made their international debut in January at the 2020 Winter Youth Olympics in Lausanne, Switzerland. They ranked first in both segments and outscored fellow Russians Sofya Tyutyunina / Alexander Shustitskiy by 5.48 points to take the gold medal.

=== 2020–21 season ===
Due to the COVID-19 pandemic, the international junior season was cancelled, and Khavronina/Cirisano competed exclusively domestically. They won the bronze medal at the 2021 Russian Junior Championships.

=== 2021–22 season ===
With the resumption of international junior competition, Khavronina/Cirisano received their first ISU Junior Grand Prix assignment to the 2021 JGP Russia in September. The team scored a new personal best to win the rhythm dance and ultimately took the gold medal overall, despite falling slightly behind compatriots Sofia Leonteva / Daniil Gorelkin in the free dance.

At their next assignment, 2021 JGP Poland, Khavronina/Cirisano again upgraded their personal best in the rhythm dance, scoring 68.05 points to win the segment.

=== 2022–23 season ===
In autumn, Khavronina/Cirisano participated at two stages of Russian Grand prix, in Sochi, finished 3rd, and Moscow finished 2nd. In result, they qualified for 2023 Russian national. At the national championship they took 5th place after the short program, but withdrew from the free program due to Irina's illness.

In January 2023, the team parted ways.

In May, it was announced that Cirisano teamed up with Denisa Cimlová from Czech Republic, however, the partnership dissolved shortly afterwards due to the Figure Skating Federation of Russia refusing to release him. In late 2023, he returned to Russia and teamed up with Elizaveta Pasechnik.

=== 2026–27 season ===
On 30 June 2026, the International Skating Union announced that figure skaters from Russia and Belarus would be allowed to compete at international competitions as Individual Neutral Athletes (AINs). Each of these skaters are be required to undergo an individual assessment conducted by the ISU Council to determine whether they meet the criteria for neutral status. The team's applications were approved, making them eligible to compete internationally as neutral athletes.

== Programs ==
=== With Khavronina ===
Season	Rhythm dance	Free dance	Exhibition
2022–2023	Dite ca vous dirait avec moi by Claude Confortès; La La La by Shakira and Carlinhos Brown	Cold Song by Klaus Nomi; Winter (from The Four Seasons) by Antonio Vivaldi	
2021–2022	OTR by Moka Efti Orchestra; Praezision (from Babylon Berlin) by Johnny Klimek and Tom Tykwer	La cumparsita performed by Klazz Brothers and Cuba Percussion; Movimiento continuo by Soledad; Por una cabeza performed by Anna Dereszowska and Machina Del Tango; Adrenalina by Electrocutango	
2020–2021	Foxtrot: Give Me This Night by Andrey Birin, Valery Syutkin; Swing: Boogie Woogie (from Stilyagi) choreo. by Natalia Yanovskaya	Toccata and Fugue in D minor, BWV 565 by Johann Sebastian Bach performed by Canadian Brass; Toccata - En Ré Mineur performed by Pierre-Yves Plat	
2019–2020	Foxtrot: Give Me This Night by Andrey Birin, Valery Syutkin; Swing: Boogie Woogie (from Stilyagi) choreo. by Natalia Yanovskaya	La Strada Suite by Marzio Conti, Nino Rota	
2018–2019	Assassin's Tango (from Mr. & Mrs. Smith) by John Powell	Xotica	

== Competitive highlights ==
JGP: Junior Grand Prix

=== Skating as an Individual Neutral Athlete ===
==== With Pasechnik ====
Competition placements at senior level
Season	2026–27
CS Trialeti Trophy	2nd

=== Skating for Russia ===
National
Event	24–25	25–26
Russian Champ.	5th	3rd

=== With Khavronina ===
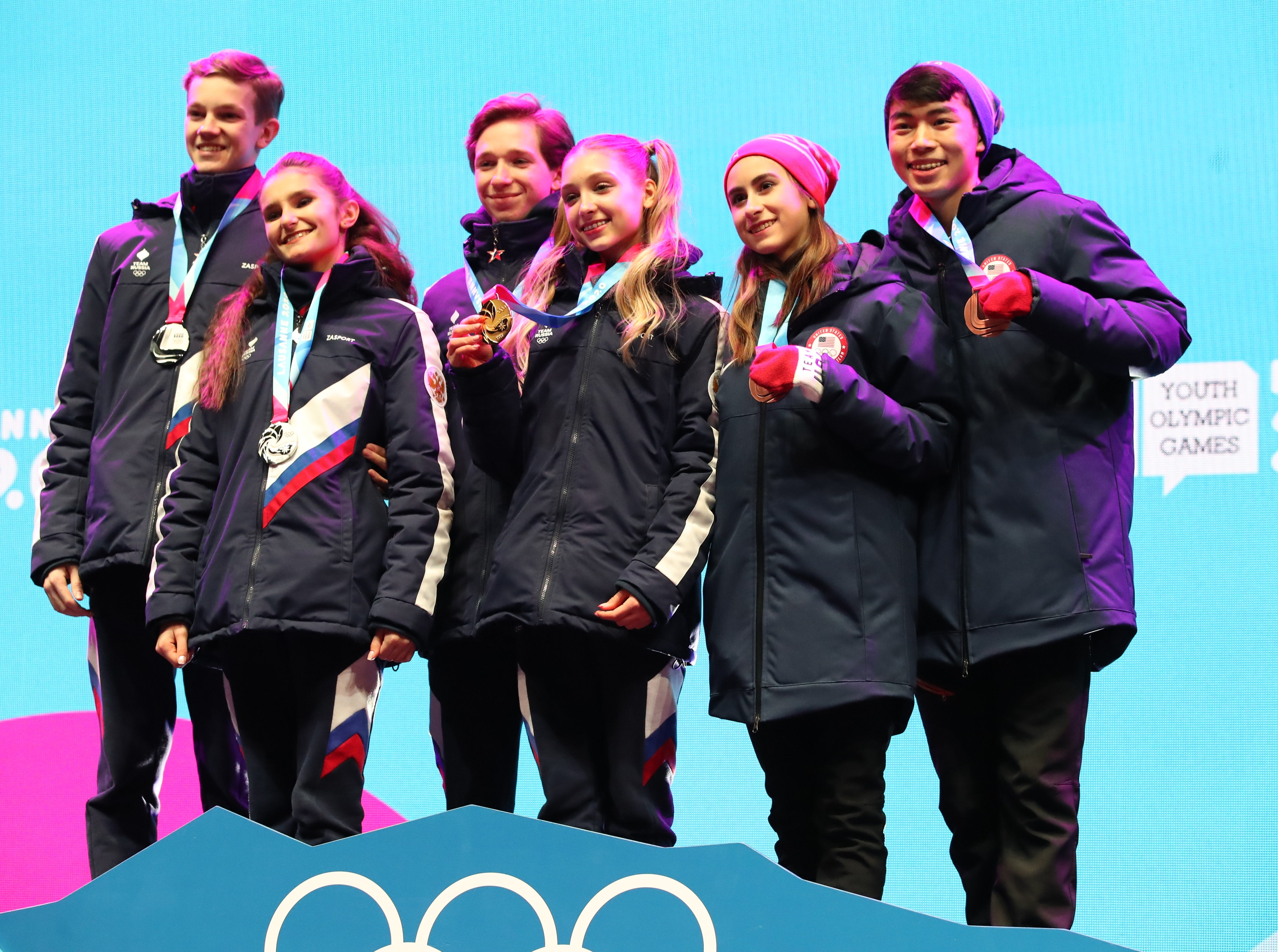
Khavronina / Cirisano (center) on the podium at the 2020 Winter Youth Olympics

International: Junior
Event	18–19	19–20	20–21	21–22	22–23
Youth Olympics		1st			
JGP Poland				1st	
JGP Russia				1st	
Halloween Cup	2nd				
Ice Mall Cup	2nd				
NRW Trophy	3rd				
Santa Claus Cup		1st			
National
Russian Jr. Champ.	11th	WD	3rd	1st	
Russian Cup Final	1st J				
TBD = Assigned; WD = Withdrew

== Detailed results ==
=== With Khavronina ===
==== Junior results ====
2021–2022 season
Date	Event	RD	FD	Total
18–22 January 2022	2022 Russian Junior Championships	3; 71.46	TBD	TBD
29 September – 2 October 2021	2021 JGP Poland	1; 68.05	1; 100.91	1; 168.96
15–18 September 2021	2021 JGP Russia	1; 66.52	2; 100.79	1; 167.31
2020–2021 season
1–5 February 2021	2021 Russian Junior Championships	2; 74.08	3; 107.52	3; 181.60
2019–2020 season
10–15 January 2020	2020 Winter Youth Olympics	1; 63.52	1; 101.11	1; 164.63
2–8 December 2019	2019 Santa Claus Cup	2; 64.38	1; 95.80	1; 160.18
