= Figure skating at the 2020 Winter Youth Olympics – Ice dance =

Ice dance at the III Winter Youth Olympic Games
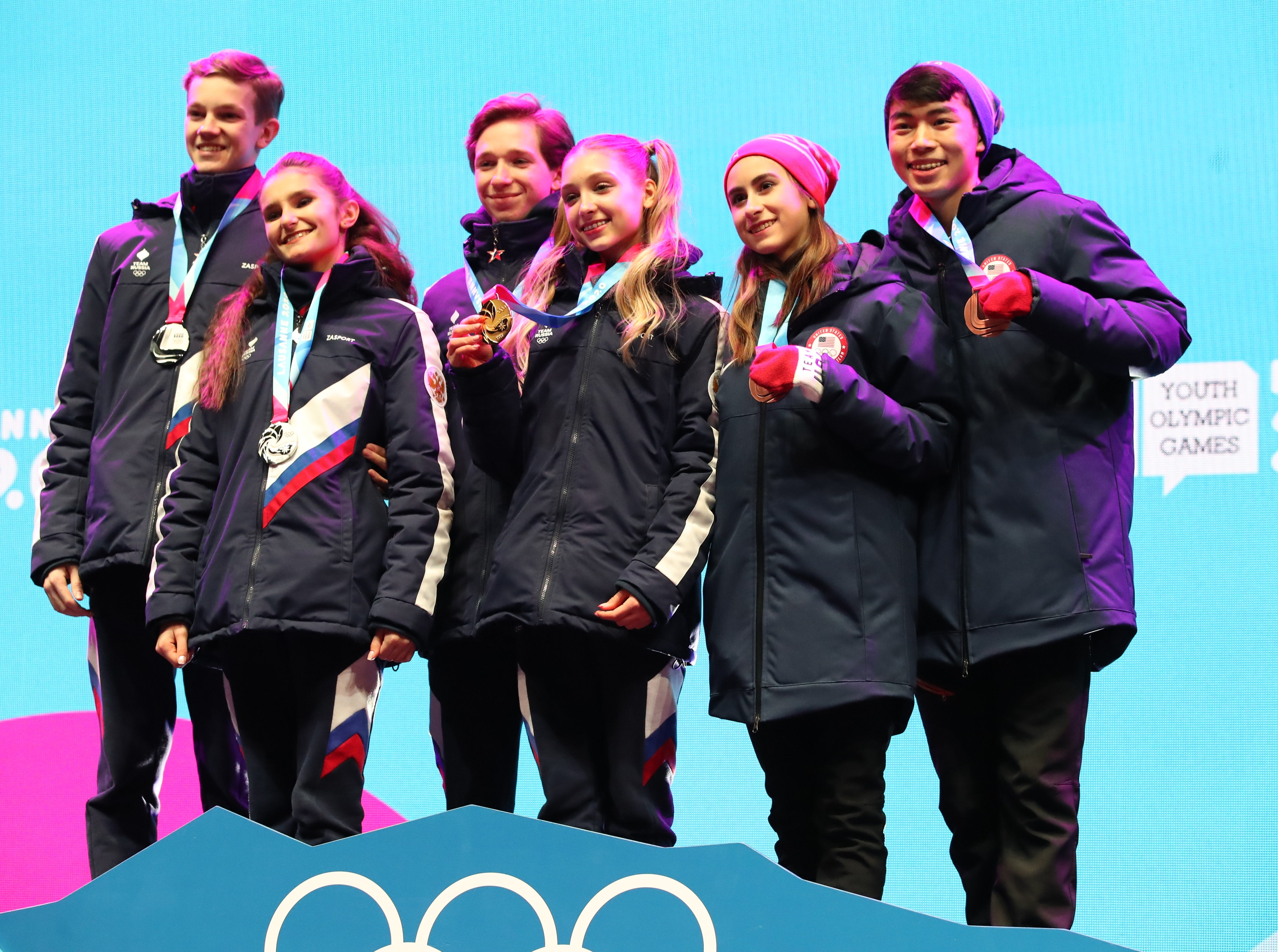
- Venue: Lausanne Skating Arena
- Dates: 11, 13 January
- Competitors: 24 from 10 nations
- Winning score: 164.63

Medalists
| 1st place, gold medalist(s) | | Irina Khavronina; Dario Cirisano | Russia |
| 2nd place, silver medalist(s) | | Sofya Tyutyunina; Alexander Shustitskiy | Russia |
| 3rd place, bronze medalist(s) | | Katarina Wolfkostin; Jeffrey Chen | United States |

The Ice dance competition of the 2020 Winter Youth Olympics is held at the Lausanne Skating Arena on 10 January (rhythm dance) and 13 January 2020 (free dance).

== Results ==
=== Rhythm dance ===
| Pl. | Name | Nation | TSS | TES | PCS | SS | TR | PE | CH | IN | Ded | StN |
|---|---|---|---|---|---|---|---|---|---|---|---|---|
| 1 | Irina Khavronina / Dario Cirisano | Russia | 63.52 | 34.61 | 28.91 | 7.14 | 7.00 | 7.25 | 7.43 | 7.32 | 0.00 | 5 |
| 2 | Sofya Tyutyunina / Alexander Shustitskiy | Russia | 62.64 | 32.96 | 29.68 | 7.43 | 7.18 | 7.43 | 7.54 | 7.54 | 0.00 | 11 |
| 3 | Natalie D'Alessandro / Bruce Waddell | Canada | 59.61 | 30.35 | 29.26 | 7.21 | 7.11 | 7.32 | 7.50 | 7.43 | 0.00 | 10 |
| 4 | Miku Makita / Tyler Gunara | Canada | 58.47 | 30.99 | 27.48 | 6.86 | 6.64 | 6.89 | 7.00 | 6.96 | 0.00 | 12 |
| 5 | Katarina Wolfkostin / Jeffrey Chen | United States | 57.02 | 30.05 | 27.97 | 7.00 | 6.82 | 6.89 | 7.18 | 7.07 | 1.00 | 9 |
| 6 | Utana Yoshida / Shingo Nishiyama | Japan | 56.38 | 30.99 | 26.39 | 6.64 | 6.43 | 6.43 | 6.71 | 6.79 | 1.00 | 8 |
| 7 | Anna Cherniavska / Oleg Muratov | Ukraine | 52.24 | 28.44 | 23.80 | 5.93 | 5.68 | 6.04 | 6.07 | 6.04 | 0.00 | 4 |
| 8 | Denisa Cimlová / Vilém Hlavsa | Czech Republic | 50,06 | 27.40 | 22.66 | 5.64 | 5.36 | 5.71 | 5.79 | 5.82 | 0.00 | 2 |
| 9 | Célina Fradji / Jean-Hans Fourneaux | France | 49.11 | 26.39 | 22.72 | 5.61 | 5.46 | 5.71 | 5.86 | 5.75 | 0.00 | 7 |
| 10 | Giulia Tuba / Andrea Tuba | Italy | 47.79 | 26.44 | 21.35 | 5.36 | 5.07 | 5.43 | 5.57 | 5.25 | 0.00 | 1 |
| 11 | Yulia Lebedeva-Bitadze / Mikhail Kaygorodtsev | Georgia | 47.20 | 24.83 | 23.37 | 5.89 | 5.71 | 5.64 | 6.11 | 5.86 | 1.00 | 3 |
| 12 | Gina Zehnder / Beda Leon Sieber | Switzerland | 36.10 | 18.86 | 17.24 | 4.36 | 4.11 | 4.36 | 4.46 | 4.25 | 0.00 | 6 |

=== Free dance ===
| Pl. | Name | Nation | TSS | TES | PCS | SS | TR | PE | CH | IN | Ded | StN |
|---|---|---|---|---|---|---|---|---|---|---|---|---|
| 1 | Irina Khavronina / Dario Cirisano | Russia | 101.11 | 55.18 | 45.93 | 7.50 | 7.32 | 7.75 | 7.82 | 7.89 | 0.00 | 11 |
| 2 | Sofya Tyutyunina / Alexander Shustitskiy | Russia | 96.51 | 51.33 | 45.18 | 7.57 | 7.43 | 7.61 | 7.61 | 7.43 | 0.00 | 12 |
| 3 | Katarina Wolfkostin / Jeffrey Chen | United States | 95.41 | 51.61 | 43.80 | 7.25 | 7.11 | 7.43 | 7.32 | 7.39 | 0.00 | 7 |
| 4 | Utana Yoshida / Shingo Nishiyama | Japan | 92.32 | 49.32 | 43.00 | 7.00 | 6.93 | 7.25 | 7.29 | 7.36 | 0.00 | 8 |
| 5 | Natalie D'Alessandro / Bruce Waddell | Canada | 91.91 | 47.74 | 44.17 | 7.32 | 7.14 | 7.43 | 7.46 | 7.46 | 0.00 | 9 |
| 6 | Miku Makita / Tyler Gunara | Canada | 90.42 | 47.50 | 42.92 | 7.14 | 7.00 | 7.21 | 7.21 | 7.21 | 0.00 | 10 |
| 7 | Denisa Cimlová / Vilém Hlavsa | Czech Republic | 80.97 | 43.89 | 37.08 | 6.07 | 5.93 | 6.29 | 6.25 | 6.25 | 0.00 | 5 |
| 8 | Anna Cherniavska / Oleg Muratov | Ukraine | 79.37 | 43.17 | 36.20 | 6.07 | 5.86 | 6.07 | 6.11 | 6.07 | 0.00 | 6 |
| 9 | Giulia Tuba / Andrea Tuba | Italy | 77.54 | 42.10 | 35.44 | 5.86 | 5.57 | 6.04 | 6.00 | 6.07 | 0.00 | 4 |
| 10 | Célina Fradji / Jean-Hans Fourneaux | France | 72.13 | 38.61 | 38.61 | 5.68 | 5.32 | 5.64 | 5.75 | 5.54 | 0.00 | 1 |
| 11 | Yulia Lebedeva-Bitadze / Mikhail Kaygorodtsev | Georgia | 68.45 | 35.37 | 34.08 | 5.86 | 5.50 | 5.57 | 5.79 | 5.68 | 1.00 | 2 |
| 12 | Gina Zehnder / Beda Leon Sieber | Switzerland | 60.85 | 35.63 | 26.22 | 4.32 | 4.04 | 4.39 | 4.71 | 4.39 | 1.00 | 3 |

=== Overall ===
| Rank | Name | Nation | Total points | RD | | FD | |
|---|---|---|---|---|---|---|---|
| 1 | Irina Khavronina / Dario Cirisano | Russia | 164.63 | 1 | 63.52 | 1 | 101.11 |
| 2 | Sofya Tyutyunina / Alexander Shustitskiy | Russia | 159.15 | 2 | 62.64 | 2 | 96.51 |
| 3 | Katarina Wolfkostin / Jeffrey Chen | United States | 152.43 | 5 | 57.02 | 3 | 95.41 |
| 4 | Natalie D'Alessandro / Bruce Waddell | Canada | 151.52 | 3 | 59.61 | 5 | 91.91 |
| 5 | Miku Makita / Tyler Gunara | Canada | 148.89 | 4 | 58.47 | 6 | 90.42 |
| 6 | Utana Yoshida / Shingo Nishiyama | Japan | 148.70 | 6 | 56.38 | 4 | 92.32 |
| 7 | Anna Cherniavska / Oleg Muratov | Ukraine | 131.61 | 7 | 52.24 | 8 | 69.37 |
| 8 | Denisa Cimlová / Vilém Hlavsa | Czech Republic | 131.03 | 8 | 50.06 | 7 | 80.97 |
| 9 | Giulia Tuba / Andrea Tuba | Italy | 125.33 | 10 | 47.79 | 9 | 67.54 |
| 10 | Célina Fradji / Jean-Hans Fourneaux | France | 121.24 | 9 | 49.11 | 10 | 62.13 |
| 11 | Yulia Lebedeva-Bitadze / Mikhail Kaygorodtsev | Georgia | 115.65 | 11 | 47.20 | 11 | 68.45 |
| 12 | Gina Zehnder / Beda Leon Sieber | Switzerland | 96.95 | 12 | 36.10 | 12 | 60.85 |

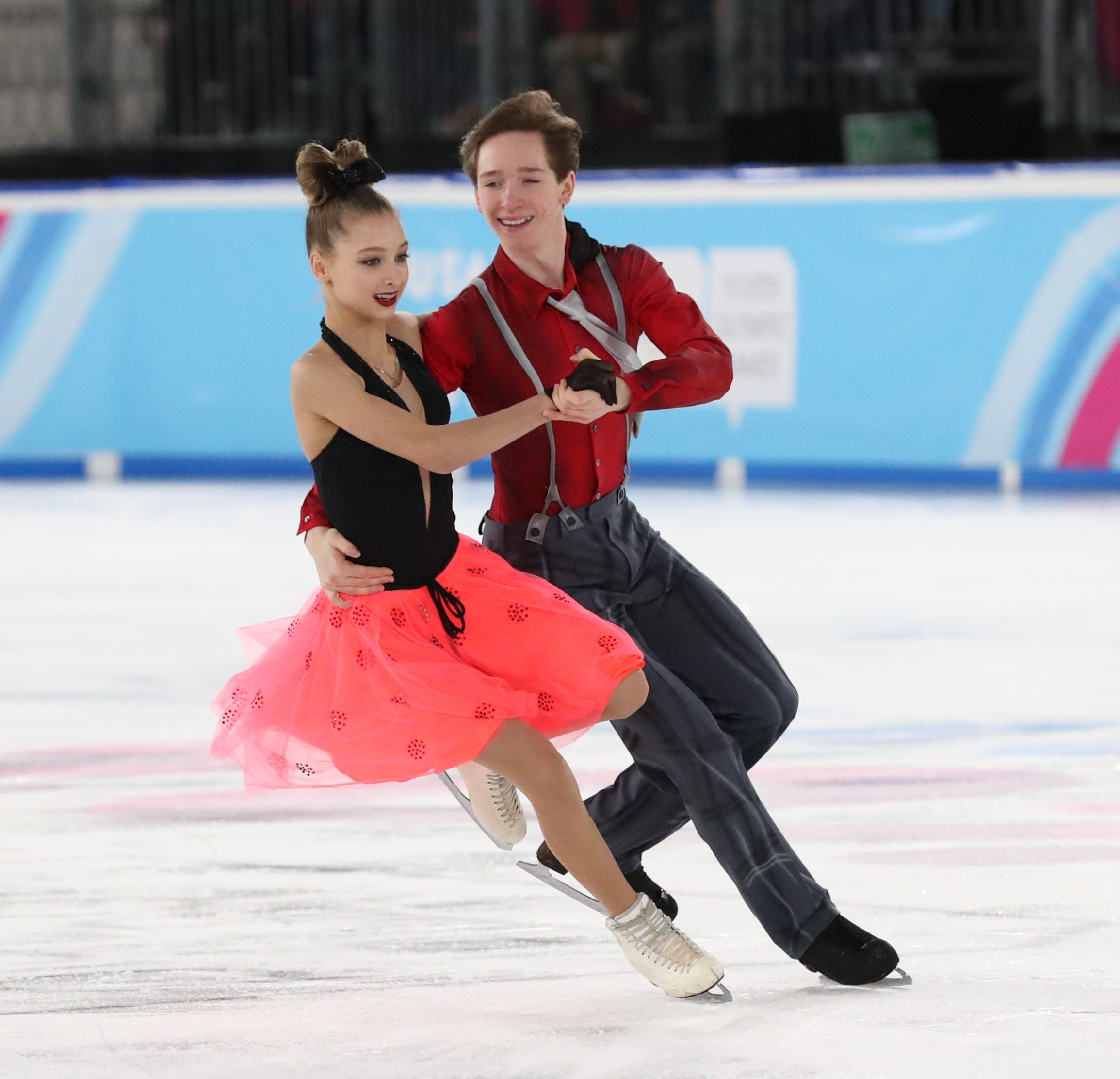
(Russia) Irina Khavronina / Dario Cirisano

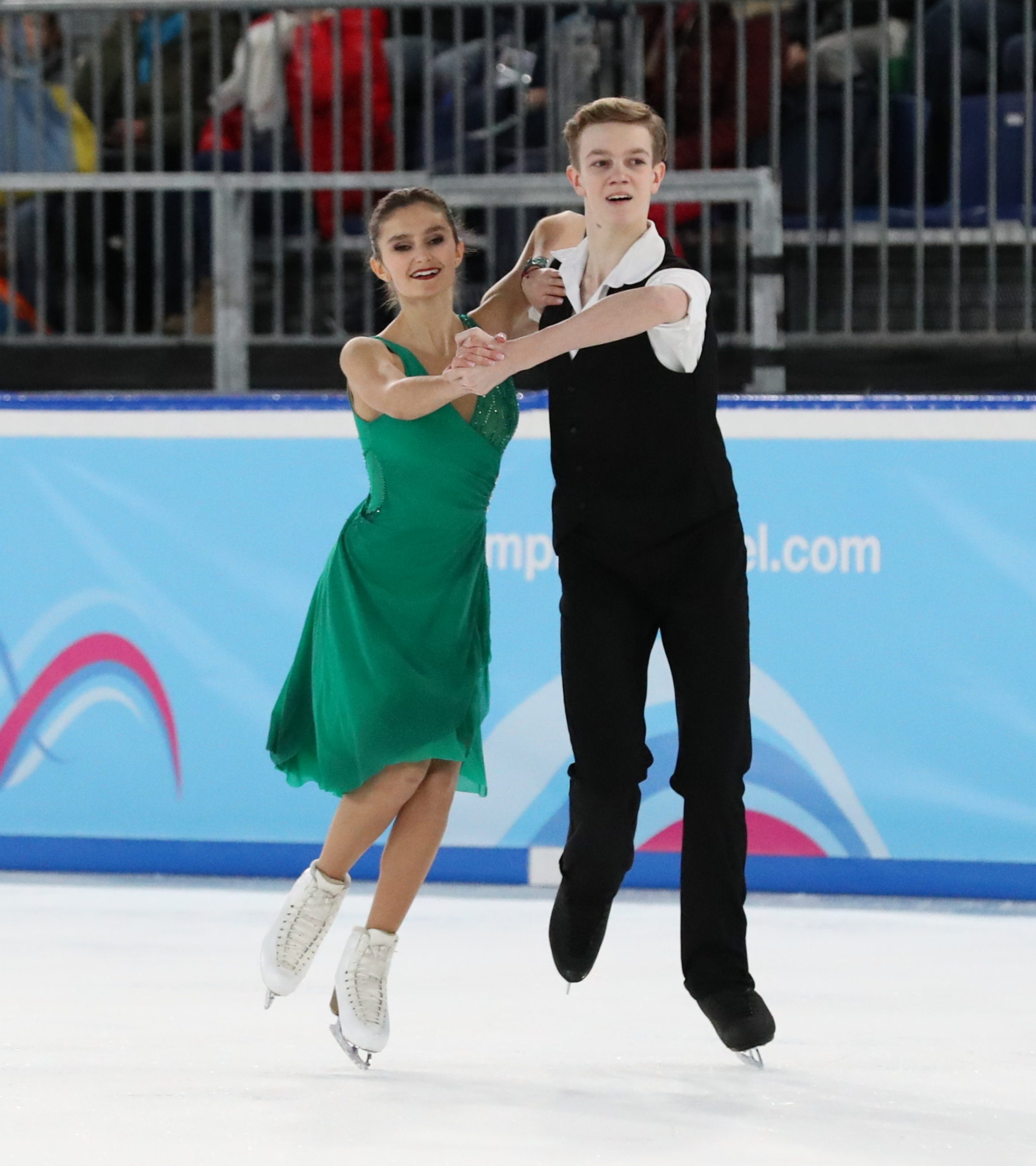
(Russia) Sofya Tyutyunina / Alexander Shustitskiy

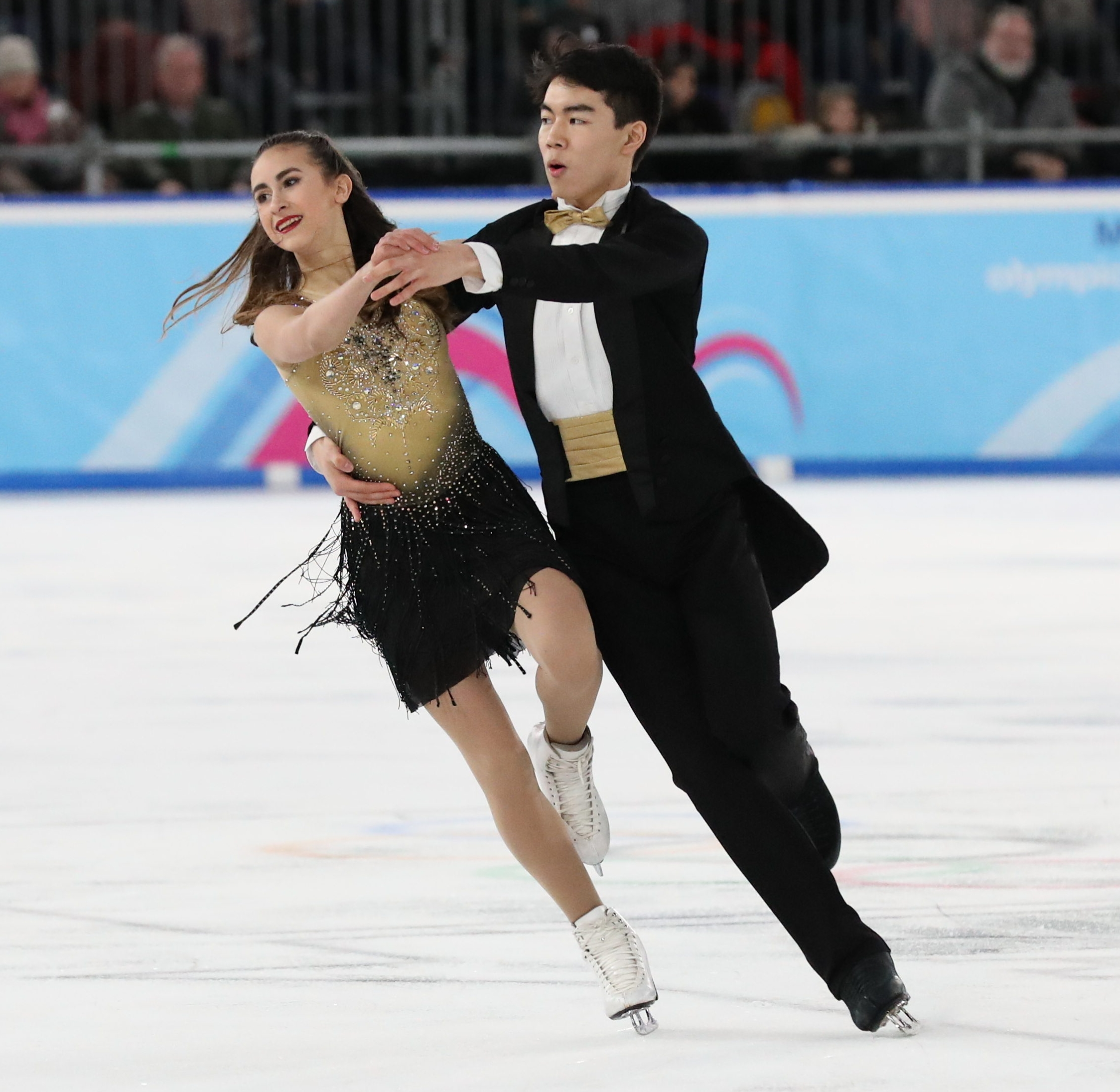
(United States) Katarina Wolfkostin /Jeffrey Chen

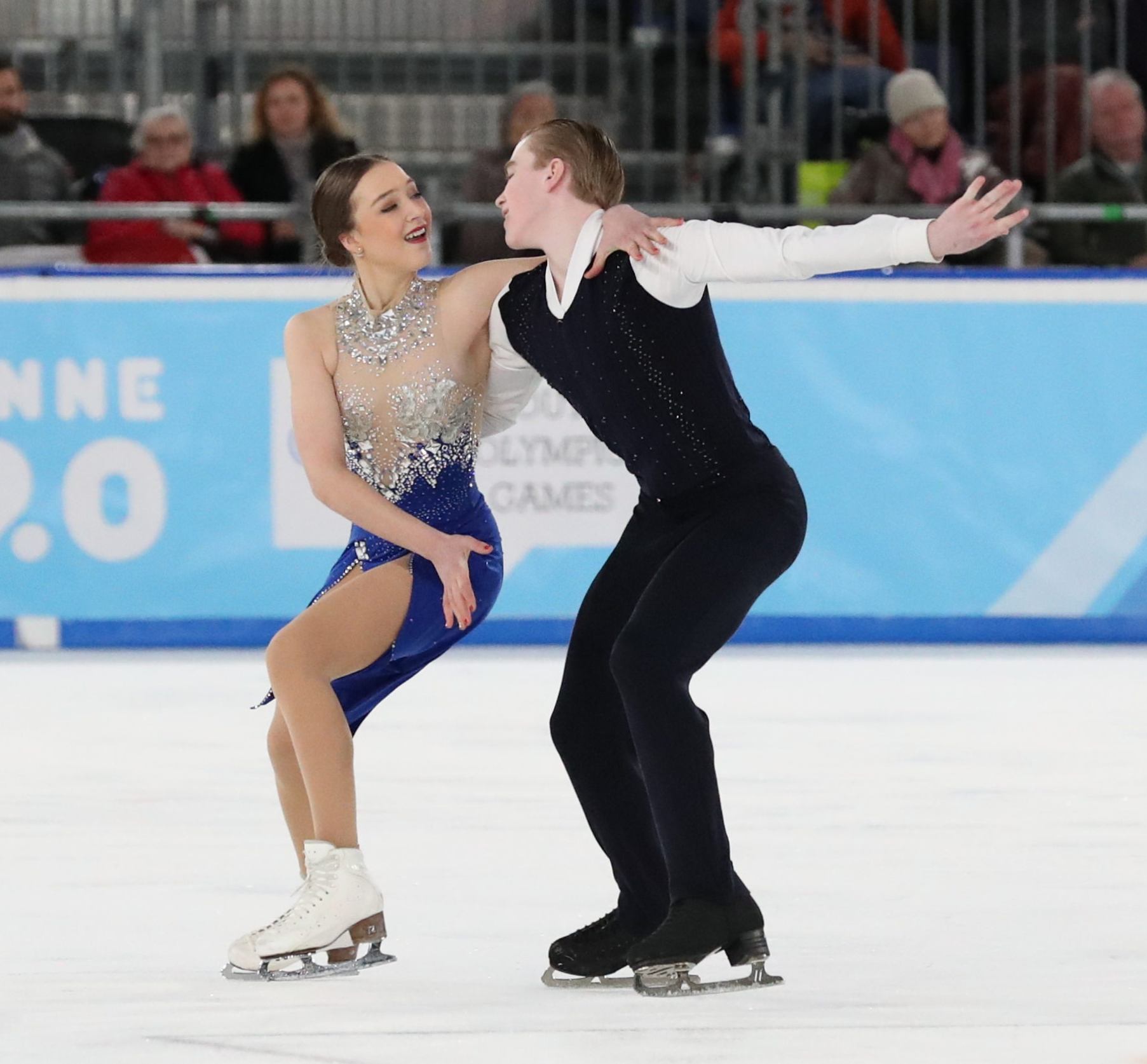
(Canada) Natalie D'Alessandro / Bruce Waddell

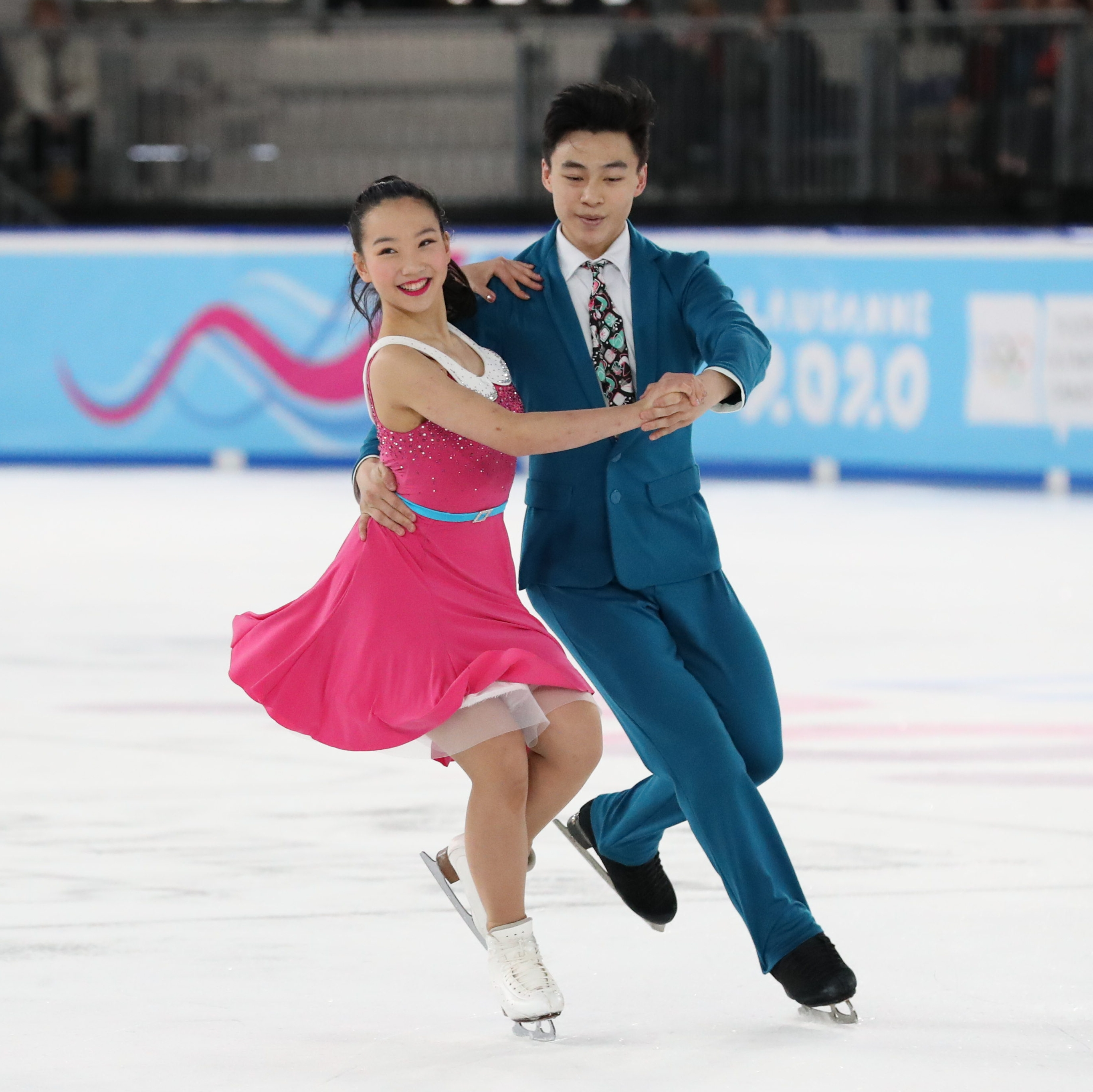
(Canada) Miku Makita /
Tyler Gunara

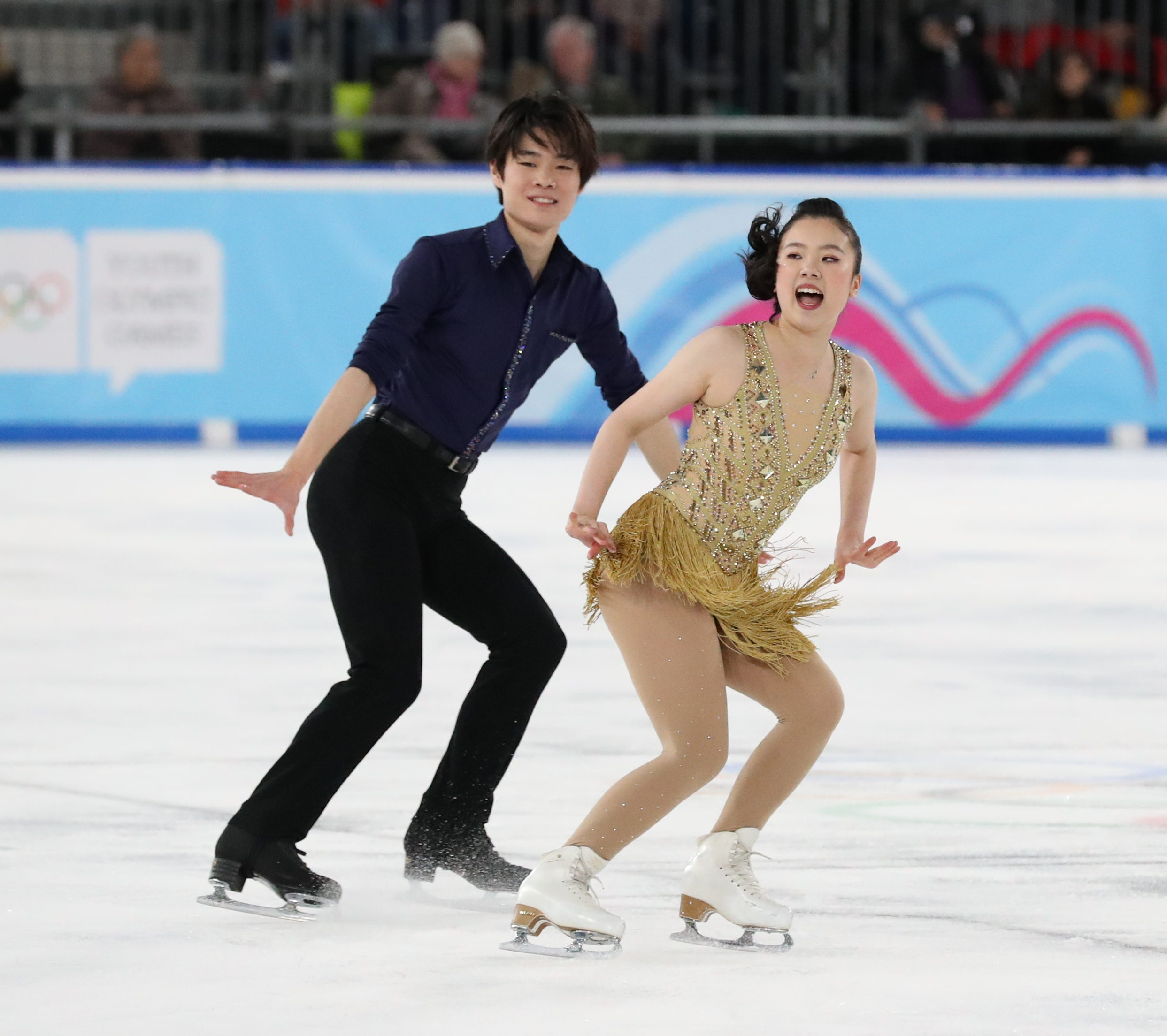
(Japan) Utana Yoshida / Shingo Nishiyama

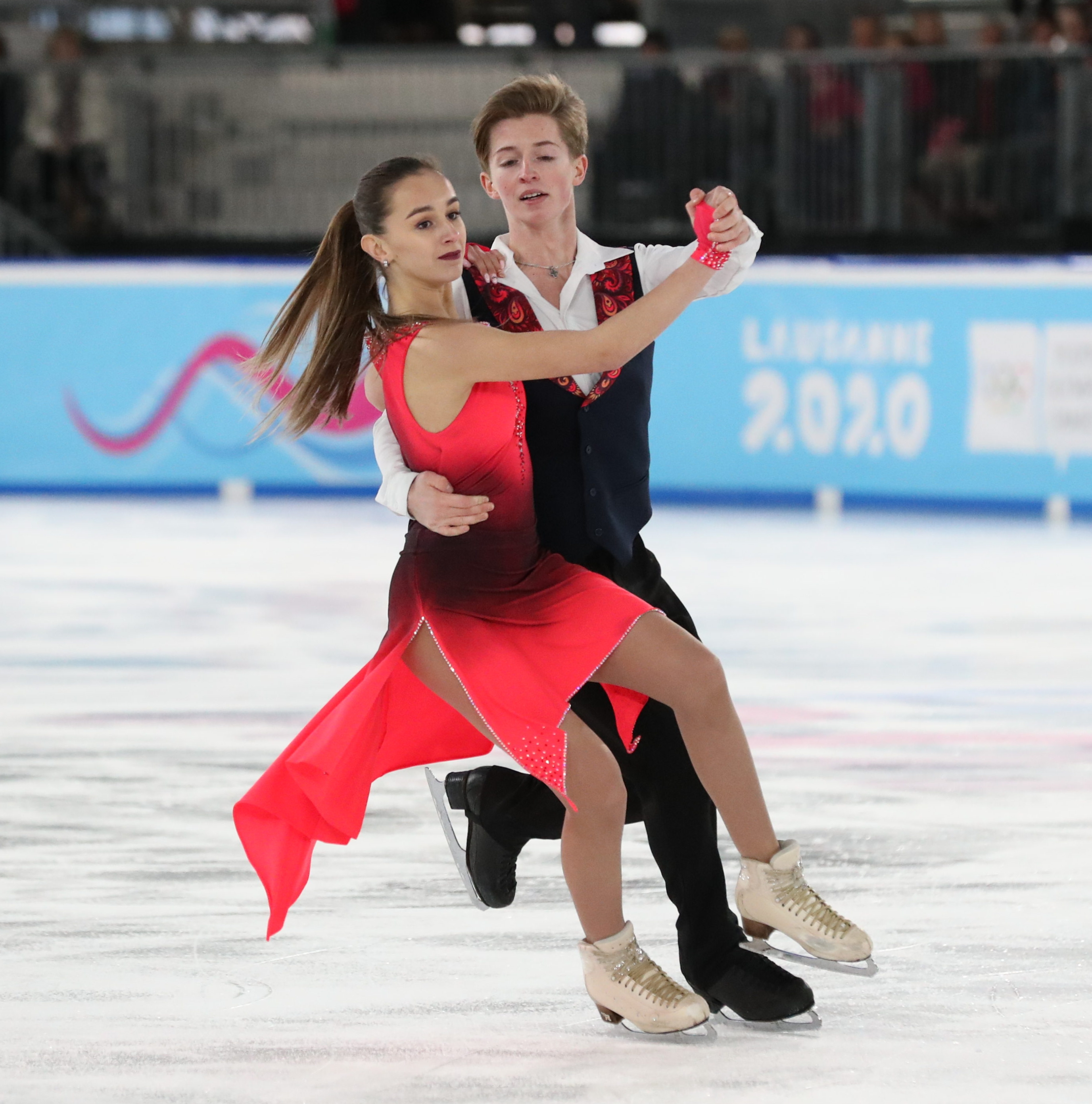
(Ukraine) Anna Cherniavska / Oleg Muratov

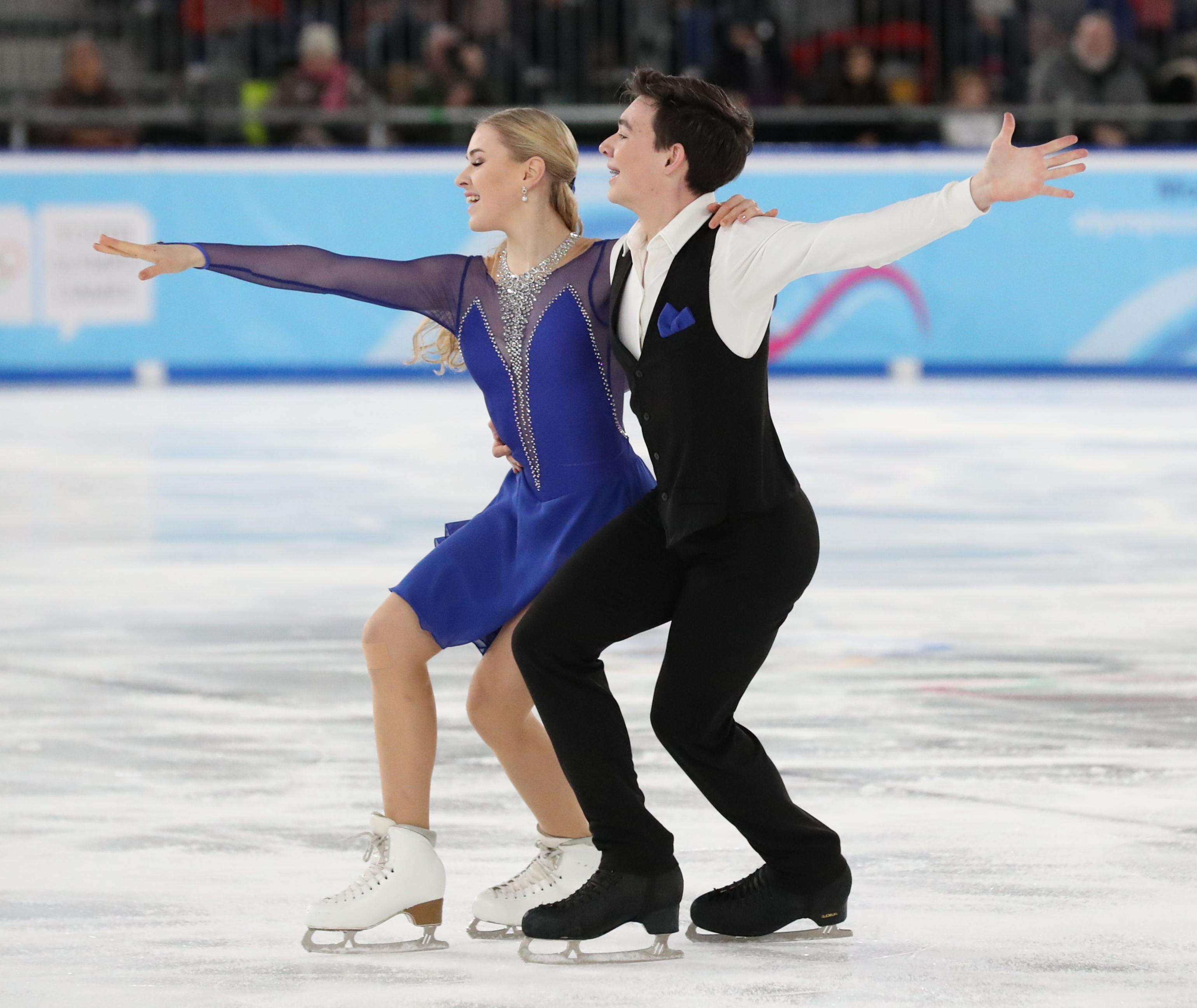
(Czech Republic) Denisa Cimlová / Vilém Hlavsa

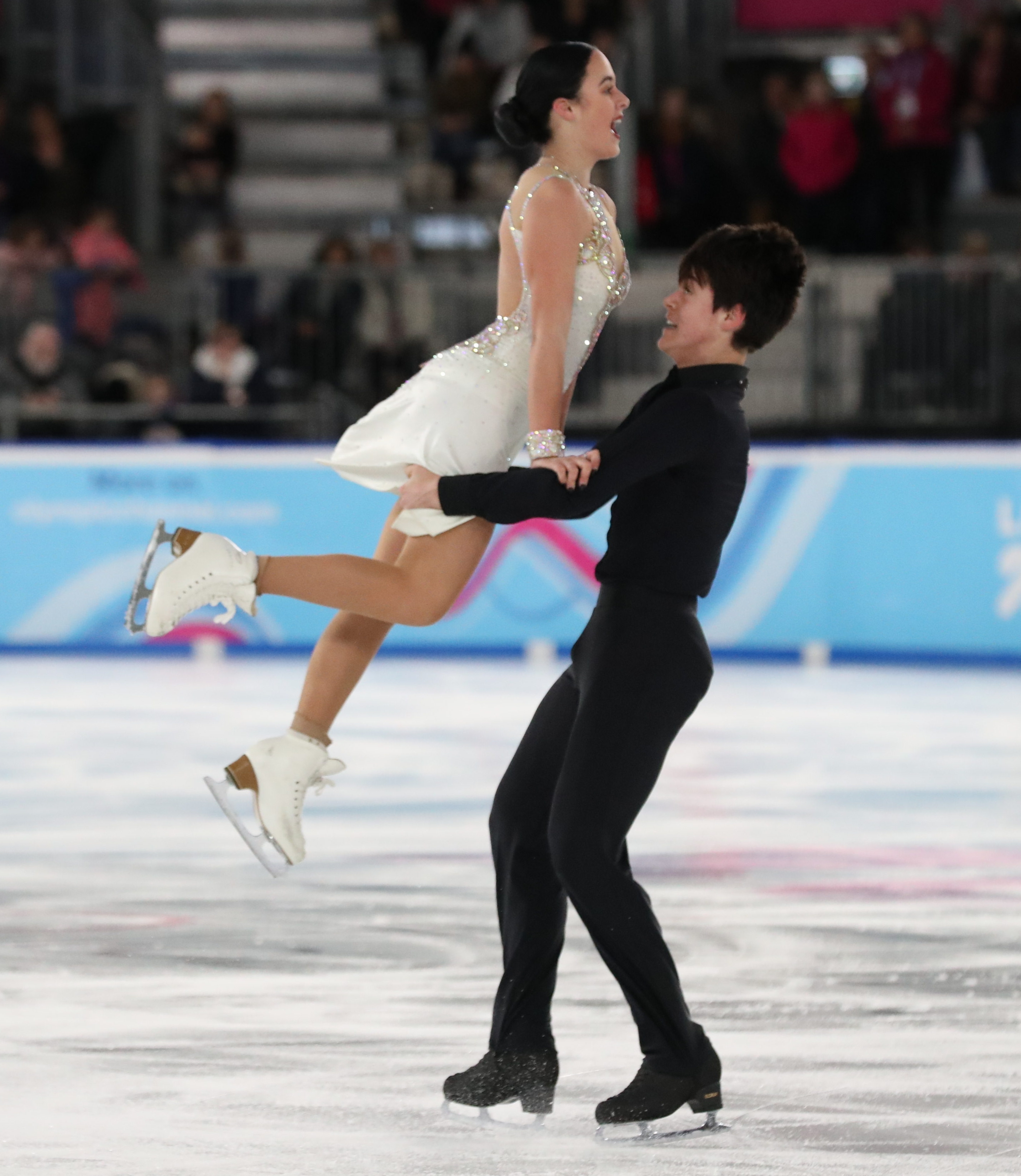
(Italy) Giulia Tuba / Andrea Tuba

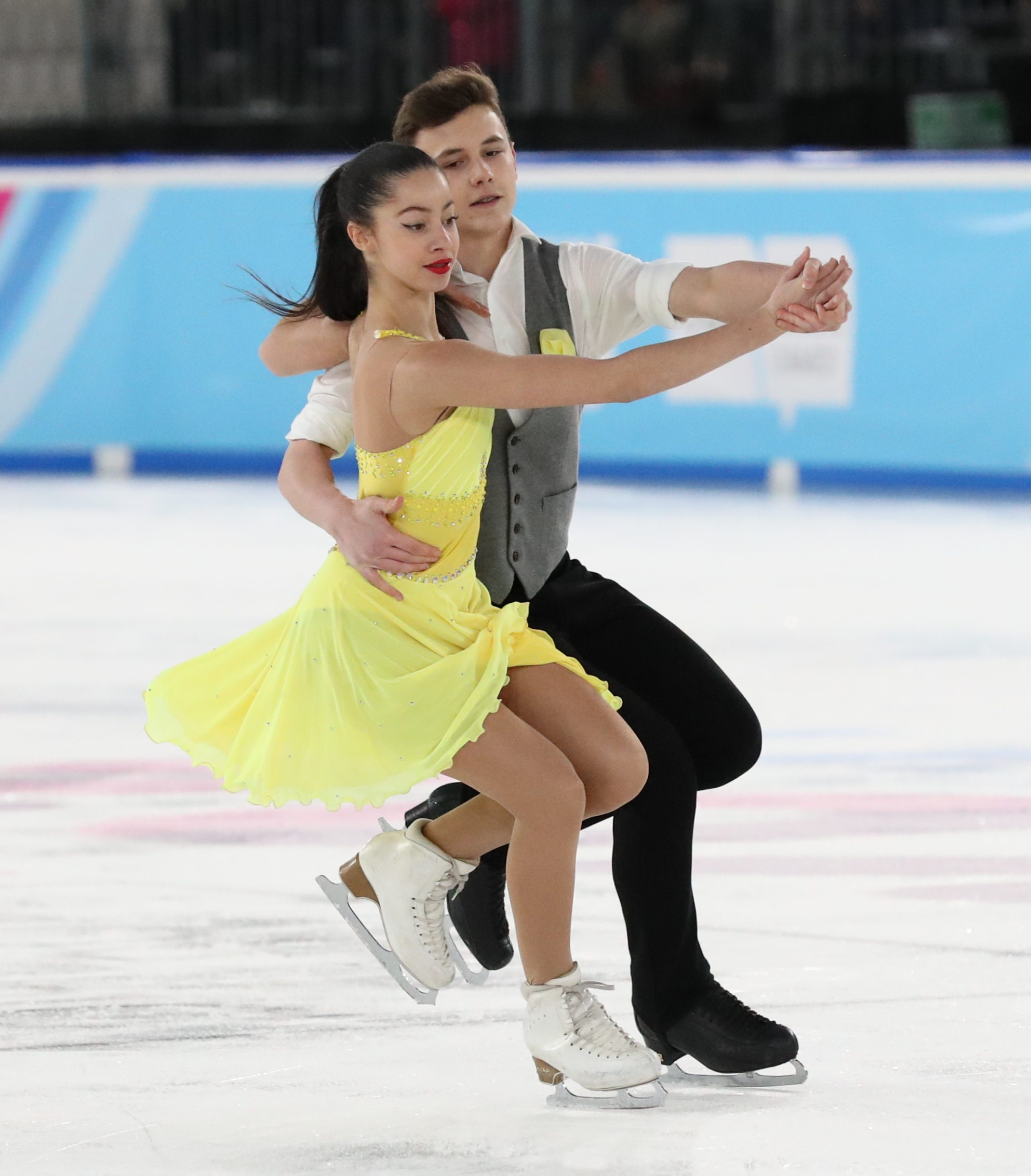
(France) Célina Fradji /
Jean-Hans Fourneaux

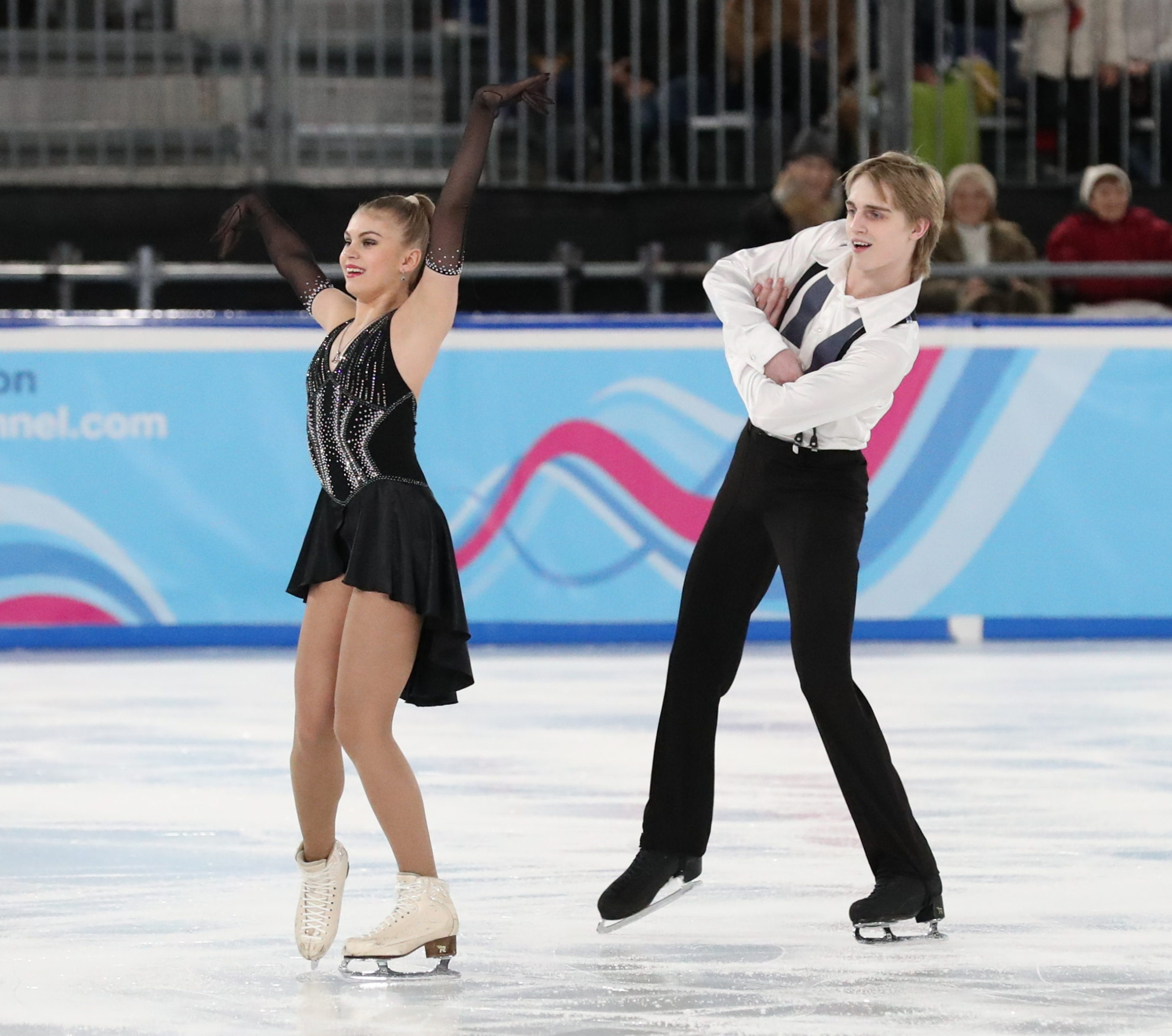
(Georgia (country)) Yulia Lebedeva-Bitadze / Mikhail Kaygorodtsev

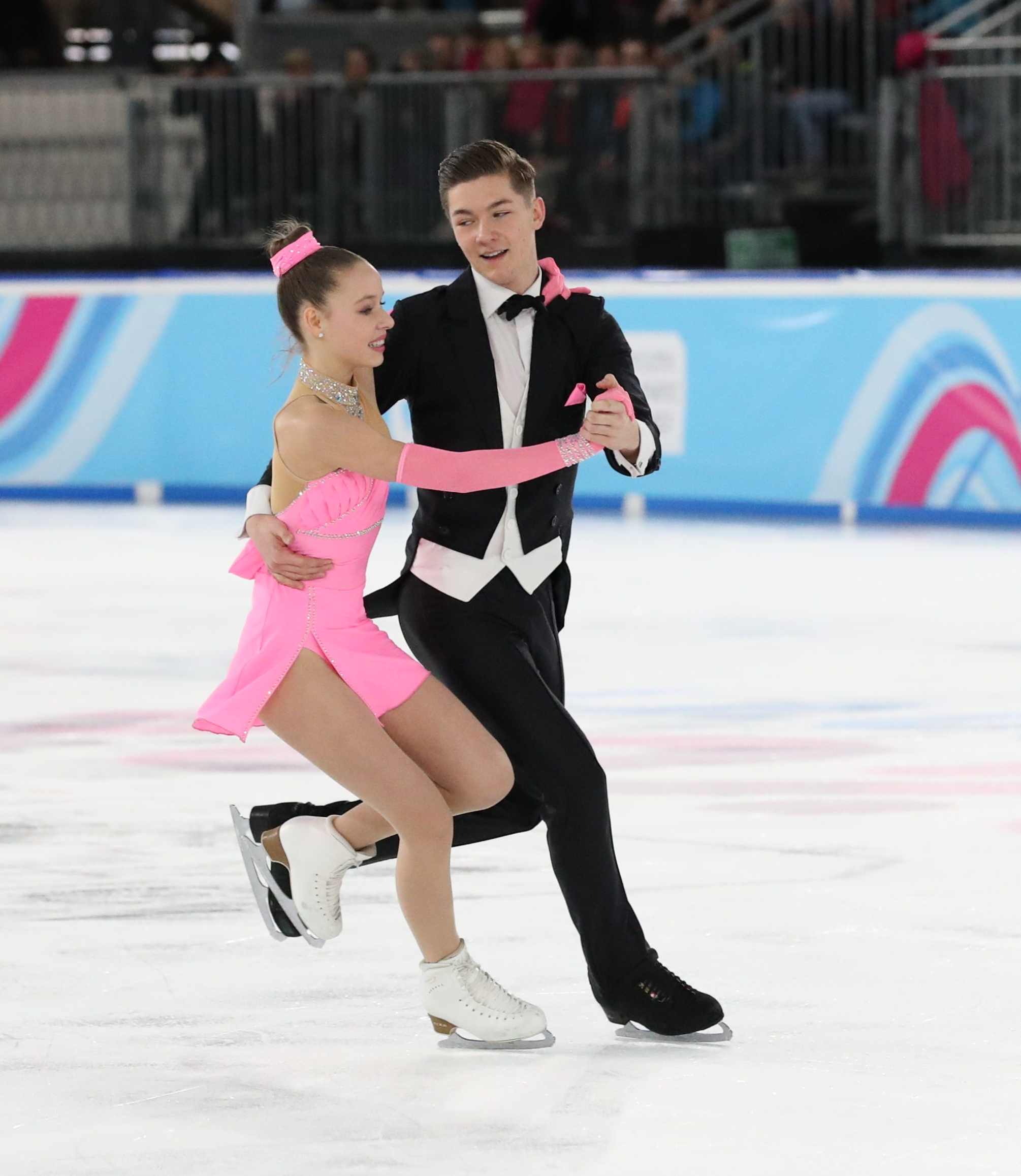
(Switzerland) Gina Zehnder /
Beda Leon Sieber
