= Natalie D'Alessandro =

Canadian figure skater

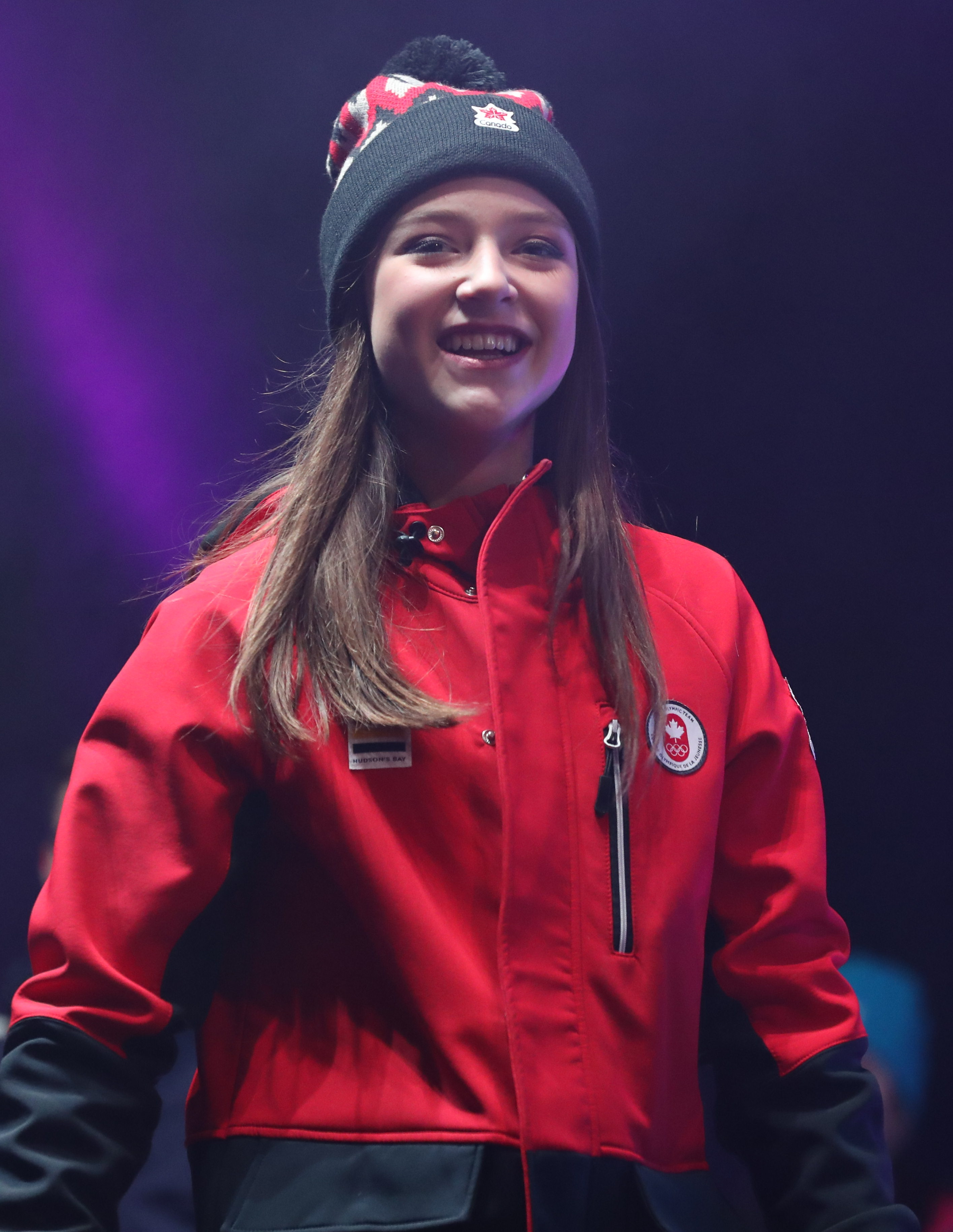
- D'Alessandro at the 2020 Winter Youth Olympics

Personal information
- Born: June 16, 2004 (age 22) Toronto, Ontario, Canada
- Height: 1.63 m (5 ft 4 in)

Figure skating career
- Country: Canada
- Discipline: Ice dance
- Began skating: 2007
- Retired: 2022

Medal record
Winter Youth Olympics
Bronze medal – third place	2020 Lausanne	Team
World Junior Championships
Silver medal – second place	2022 Tallinn	Ice dance

Natalie D'Alessandro (born June 16, 2004) is a Canadian retired ice dancer. With her skating partner, Bruce Waddell, she is the 2022 World Junior silver medallist and 2022 Canadian national junior champion. They have won three medals on the ISU Junior Grand Prix series, including gold at the 2021 JGP Slovakia, and bronze in the 2020 Winter Youth Olympics team event.

== Personal life ==
D'Alessandro has two brothers. She enjoys photography and baking.

Since her retirement from competitive skating, D'Alessandro has attended the Ivey School of Business at University of Western Ontario.

== Skating career ==
D'Alessandro started skating in 2007 and initially competed in singles, winning a bronze medal in the novice ladies' event at the 2016 Canadian Championships.

Both D'Alessandro and Bruce Waddell trained as singles skaters at the Toronto Cricket, Skating and Curling Club, and initially tried out as a dance team at the suggestion of the TCC's dance coach, Andrew Hallam. D'Alessandro/Waddell were pre-novice champions at the 2016 Skate Canada Challenge, and then won the novice title at the 2017 Canadian Championships. Making their international debut as a dance team, they placed fourth at the 2017 Bavarian Open in the advanced novice division.

=== 2017–18 season: Junior debut ===
D'Alessandro/Waddell were assigned by Skate Canada to make their debut on the ISU Junior Grand Prix, with one assignment to the 2017 JGP Australia in Brisbane. Placing sixth, Waddell commented that the international competition made them "more nervous than usual." Competing at the 2018 Canadian Junior Championships, they placed eighth.

=== 2018–19 season: Junior national bronze ===
Given two assignments on the Junior Grand Prix, D'Alessandro/Waddell were fourth at the 2018 JGP Austria and sixth at the 2018 JGP Canada, the latter held in Richmond, British Columbia. Competing at the 2019 Canadian Junior Championships, they won the bronze medal.

=== 2019–20 season: First JGP medal ===
Again assigned to two events on the Junior Grand Prix, D'Alessandro/Waddell began the season at the 2019 JGP Latvia, where they placed fourth, missing the bronze medal by 0.68 points after sitting in third after the rhythm dance. At their second event, the 2019 JGP Italy, they won the silver medal, the highest colour of medal won by a Canadian dance team on the Junior Grand Prix that season. D'Alessandro commented afterwards "seeing your name on the podium with the Canadian flag next to it is a pretty cool feeling."

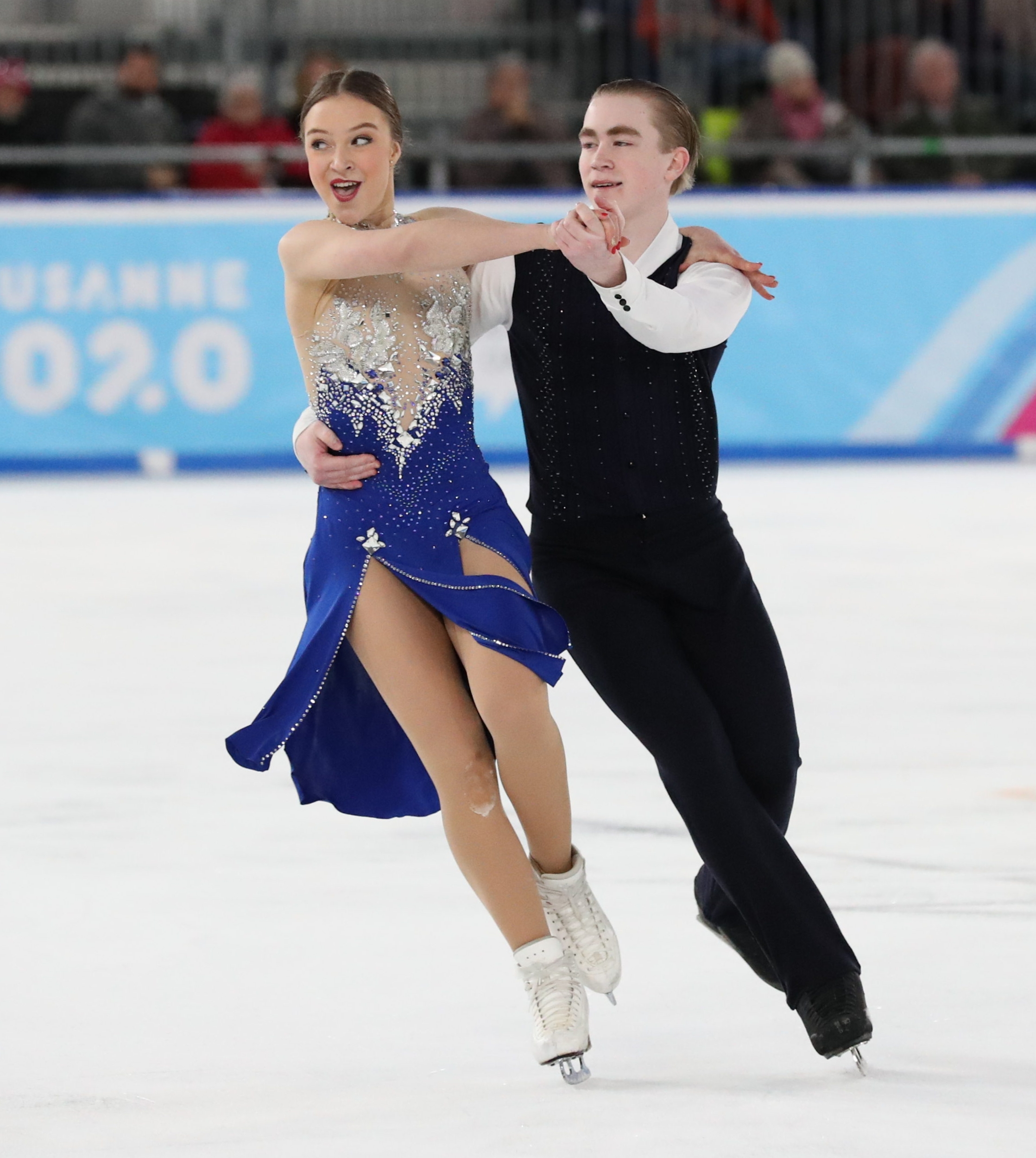
D'Alessandro & Waddell compete in the rhythm dance at the 2020 Winter Youth Olympics

D'Alessandro/Waddell won the gold at the 2020 Skate Canada Challenge. This would be their final domestic competition of the season, as they were assigned as part of the Canadian delegation to the 2020 Winter Youth Olympics in Lausanne, which both had had as a longtime goal. Competing in the ice dance event in Lausanne, D'Alessandro/Waddell placed third in the rhythm dance despite encountering level issues on several elements. These continued in the free dance, where they placed fifth, and dropped to fourth place overall, 0.91 points behind bronze medallists Wolfkostin/Chen. Waddell said after "there were a few technical errors but I definitely still had a blast." They subsequently won a bronze medal in the team event.

Skate Canada assigned D'Alessandro/Waddell to one of Canada's three berths at the 2020 World Junior Championships in Tallinn, Estonia, and also to compete at the 2020 Bavarian Open in the junior division. They won the bronze medal, narrowly behind fellow Canadians Bronsard/Bouaraguia. D'Alessandro/Waddell finished the season at the World Junior Championships, where they placed eleventh, narrowly behind the other Canadian teams competing, Bronsard/Bouraguia and Makita/Gunara.

=== 2020–21 season ===
With the COVID-19 pandemic severely constraining competitions, both the ISU Junior Grand Prix and the 2021 World Junior Championships were cancelled. As well, in-person domestic competition was limited, as a result of which D'Alessandro/Waddell competed only once during the season, at a virtually-held 2021 Skate Canada Challenge. They won the gold medal. The 2021 Canadian Junior Championships were subsequently cancelled.

=== 2021–22 season: World Junior silver ===
With the resumption of the Junior Grand Prix, D'Alessandro/Waddell returned to international competition at the 2021 JGP Slovakia in Košice. Second in the rhythm dance behind the Russians Kaganovskaia/Angelopol, they won the free dance after a poorly-designed choreographic element resulted in the Russians receiving two fall deductions, and took the gold medal. They were the only non-Russian gold medallists at the event. D'Alessandro commented on the effects of the pandemic, saying the long absence from competition "made us hungrier and more excited to come out here." Weeks later at their second event, the 2021 JGP Slovenia in Ljubljana, they won the bronze medal behind Kaganovskaia/Angelopol and top Americans Wolfkostin/Chen.

In November, D'Alessandro/Waddell competed at the junior event at the 2021 Ice Challenge in Graz. Second in the short program, they won the free dance and took the gold medal, their second international win of the season. Waddell assessed the result as having had "lots of positives but also a couple of negatives we weren't as happy about. But that’s super necessary for us to happen in order to realize the difference between this and an amazing performance." While their results on the Junior Grand Prix had qualified them to the Junior Grand Prix Final in December, this event was cancelled as a result of restrictions prompted by the Omicron variant.

Entering the 2022 Canadian Junior Championships as the favourites for the gold medal, they won both programs to take their first national junior title. They were subsequently sent to compete at the Egna Trophy, taking the silver medal in the junior competition.

Due to the pandemic, the 2022 World Junior Championships could not be held as scheduled in Sofia in early March, and as a result were rescheduled for Tallinn in mid-April. Due to Vladimir Putin's invasion of Ukraine, the International Skating Union banned all Russian and Belarusian athletes from participating, which had a significant impact on the dance field. As a result, D'Alessandro/Waddell entered the event as major medal contenders alongside Americans Wolfkostin/Chen and Brown/Brown. In the rhythm dance, D'Alessandro/Waddell scored an even 64 points, finishing in second place behind the Browns with 66.98. Fellow Canadians Bashynska/Beaumont were third, while Wolfkostin/Chen were distantly in ninth after she fell on her twizzle sequence. They were third in the free dance, behind Brown/Brown and Wolfkostin/Chen, but won the silver medal. D'Alessandro said afterward that "this season we've trained so hard, so many mornings, and finishing it off on the podium at a competition like this...it still has not sunk in." With Bashynska/Beaumont winning the bronze medal, it was the first time two Canadian dance teams had stood on the podium together at the World Junior Championships.

On May 3, 2022, D'Alessandro and Waddell announced on their joint Instagram account that they would no longer be skating together, stating "the time has come when we are excited to move on with new separate adventures." D'Alessandro said that she was retiring to pursue university studies full-time.

== Programs ==
Season	Rhythm dance	Free dance
2021–2022	Blues: Son of a Preacher Man (from Pulp Fiction) by Dusty Springfield; Hitting the Fan (from The Good Wife) by David Buckley; Pump It by Black Eyed Peas choreo. by Romain Haguenauer	Swan Lake by Pyotr Ilyich Tchaikovsky choreo. by Romain Haguenauer
2020–2021	Foxtrot: He Loves and She Loves (from Funny Face) by George Gershwin; Quickstep: Le Jazz Hot! (from Victor/Victoria) by Henry Mancini both performed by Julie Andrews choreo. by Romain Haguenauer	Swan Lake by Pyotr Ilyich Tchaikovsky choreo. by Romain Haguenauer
2019–2020	Foxtrot: He Loves and She Loves (from Funny Face) by George Gershwin; Quickstep: Le Jazz Hot! (from Victor/Victoria) by Henry Mancini both performed by Julie Andrews choreo. by Romain Haguenauer	I'd Do Anything For Love (But I Won't Do That) by Jim Steinman performed by Meat Loaf choreo. by Romain Haguenauer
2018–2019	Argentine Tango: Querer; Tango: Toreado (from Cirque du Soleil) by René Dupéré choreo. by Romain Haguenauer	Malagueña by Ernesto Lecuona; Carmen Suite by Georges Bizet arranged by Rodion Shchedrin choreo. by Romain Haguenauer
	Short dance	
2017–2018	Cha cha: I Need to Know by Marc Anthony; Cha cha: Let's Get Loud (from On the 6) by Jennifer Lopez choreo. by Romain Haguenauer	Compilation 74: Your Song by Elton John, Bernie Taupin; Your Song performed by Ewan McGregor, Alessandro Safina; Original Arrangement/A Wonderful Love by Karl Hugo choreo. by Romain Haguenauer

== Competitive highlights ==
=== Ice dance with Bruce Waddell ===
ISU personal best scores in the +5/-5 GOE System
Segment	Type	Score	Event
Total	TSS	163.04	2021 JGP Slovakia
Rhythm dance	TSS	64.48	2021 JGP Slovakia
Rhythm dance	TES	34.92	2021 JGP Slovakia
Rhythm dance	PCS	30.05	2022 World Junior Championships
Free dance	TSS	98.56	2021 JGP Slovakia
Free dance	TES	52.74	2021 JGP Slovakia
Free dance	PCS	47.01	2022 World Junior Championships

- JGP – Event of the ISU Junior Grand Prix Series
- C – Event was cancelled

Competition placements at junior level
Season	2017–18	2018–19	2019–20	2020–21	2021–22
Winter Youth Olympics			4th		
Winter Youth Olympics (Team event)			3rd		
World Junior Championships			11th		2nd
Canadian Championships	8th	3rd		C	1st
JGP Australia	6th				
JGP Austria		4th			
JGP Canada		6th			
JGP Italy			2nd		
JGP Latvia			4th		
JGP Slovakia					1st
JGP Slovenia					3rd
Bavarian Open			3rd		
Egna Trophy					2nd
Ice Challenge					1st
Skate Canada Challenge	10th	7th	1st	1st	

=== Single skating ===
Event	16–17	17–18	18–19
National
Canadian Champ.	15th J		9th J
SC Challenge	11th J	28th J	14th J

== Detailed results ==
ISU Personal Bests highlighted in bold.

With Waddell

=== Junior results ===
2021–22 season
Date	Event	RD	FD	Total
April 13–17, 2022	2022 World Junior Championships	2; 64.00	3; **98.56**	2; 162.56
February 4–6, 2022	2022 Egna Dance Trophy	2; 62.62	2; 97.09	2; 167.06
January 6–12, 2022	2022 Canadian Junior Championships	1; 70.79	1; 104.24	1; 175.03
November 11–14, 2021	2021 Ice Challenge	2; 60.65	1; 93.01	1; 153.66
September 22–25, 2021	2021 JGP Slovenia	2; 64.26	3; 97.53	3; 161.79
September 1–4, 2021	2021 JGP Slovakia	2; **64.48**	1; **98.56**	1; **163.04**
2020–21 season
Date	Event	RD	FD	Total
January 15–17, 2021	2021 Skate Canada Junior Challenge	1; 68.08	1; 101.79	1; 169.87
2019–20 season
Date	Event	RD	FD	Total
March 2–8, 2020	2020 World Junior Championships	9; 61.63	12; 90.16	11; 151.79
February 3–9, 2020	2020 Bavarian Open	3; 61.48	3; 93.57	3; 155.05
January 10–15, 2020	2020 Winter Youth Olympics – Team	–	3; 95.73	3T/3P
January 10–15, 2020	2020 Winter Youth Olympics	3; 59.61	5; 91.91	4; 151.52
Nov. 27 – Dec. 1, 2019	2020 Skate Canada Junior Challenge	1; 69.79	1; 104.53	1; 174.32
October 2–5, 2019	2019 JGP Italy	2; 63.25	3; 89.51	2; 152.76
September 4–7, 2019	2019 JGP Latvia	3; 61.68	4; 90.44	4; 152.12
2018–19 season
Date	Event	RD	FD	Total
January 13–20, 2019	2019 Canadian Junior Championships	6; 58.75	2; 97.04	3; 155.79
Nov. 28 – Dec. 2, 2018	2019 Skate Canada Junior Challenge	5; 58.14	6; 88.70	7; 146.84
September 12–15, 2018	2018 JGP Canada	7; 52.94	4; 85.19	6; 138.13
Aug. 29 – Sept. 1, 2018	2018 JGP Austria	5; 50.45	3; 84.97	4; 135.42
2017–18 season
Date	Event	SD	FD	Total
January 8–14, 2018	2018 Canadian Junior Championships	9; 50.99	8; 72.84	8; 123.83
Nov. 28 – Dec. 2, 2017	2018 Skate Canada Junior Challenge	11; 44.90	7; 67.92	10; 112.82
August 23–26, 2017	2017 JGP Australia	6; 47.70	6; 65.55	6; 113.25
