= Quadro Nuevo =

Quadro Nuevo is a German acoustic quartet which was founded in 1996 by guitarist Robert Wolf, reedist Mulo Francel, accordionist Andreas Hinterseher and bassist D. D. Lowka. They have an "alchemical acoustic sound from elements of flamenco, Balkan swing, traditional folk, and avant-garde improvisation".

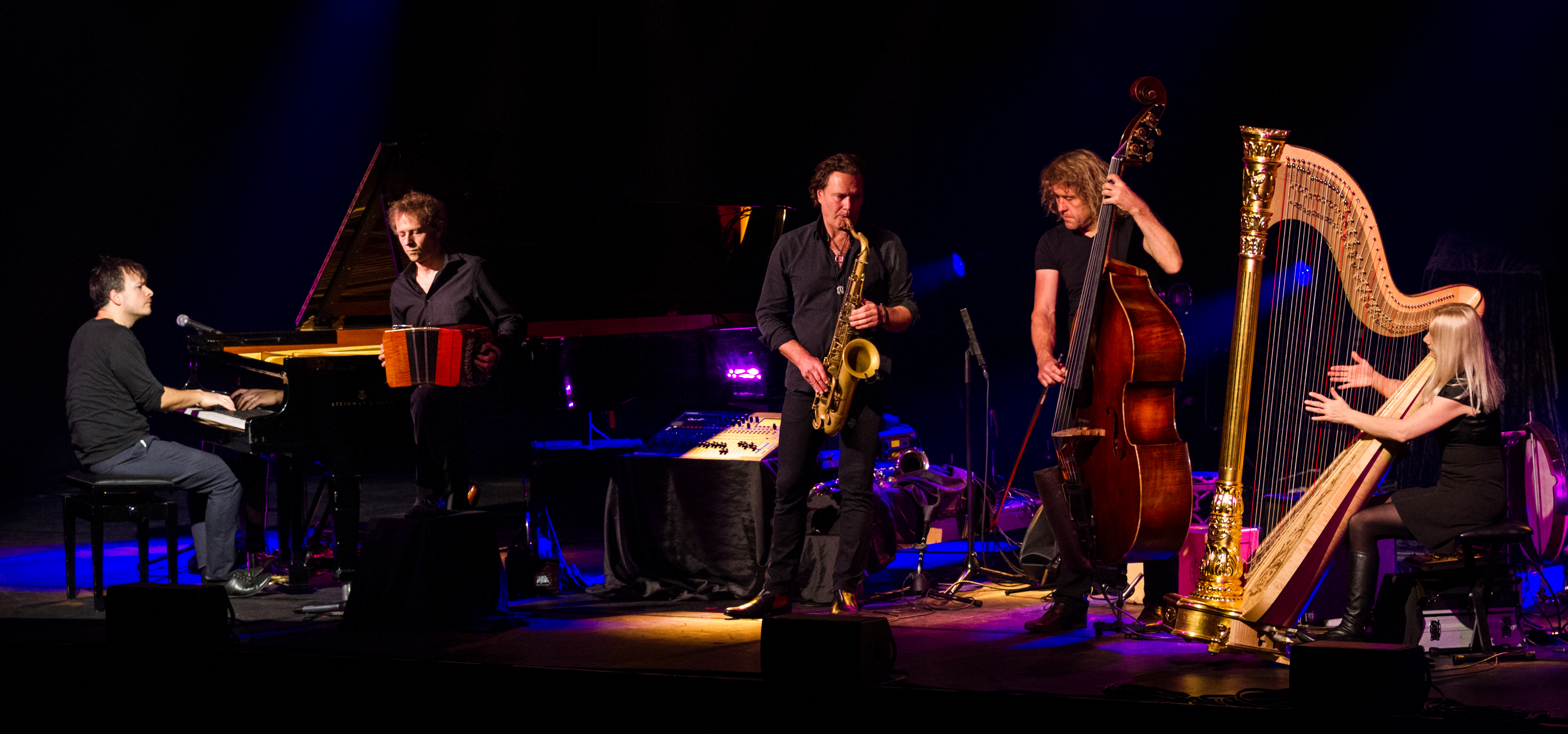
Quadro Nuevo live at "Leverkusener Jazztage" 2015

== Discography ==
- Luna Rossa (1998)
- Buongiorno Tristezza (1999)
- CinéPassion (2000)
- Canzone della Strada (2002)
- Mocca Flor (2004)
- Tango Bitter Sweet (2006)
- Antakya (2008)
- Grand Voyage (2010)
- Schöne Kinderlieder (2011)
- Quadro Nuevo "In Concert" (2011)
- End of the Rainbow (2013)
- Bethlehem (2013)
- Tango (2015)
- Flying Carpet (2017)
- Volkslied Reloaded (2019)
- Mare (2020)
- Secret Recordings (2021)
- Odyssee - A Journey Into The Light (2022)
- December (2022)
- Happy Deluxe (2024)
- Inside the Island (2025)

as well as a live-recording of a concert during the 35th Jazz-Festival in Burghausen/ Germany ("Jazzwoche Burghausen") on DVD (Quadro Nuevo LIVE)
