= Eros Piano =

Piano concerto by John Adams, American minimalist composer

Eros Piano is a piano concerto written by the American minimalist composer John Adams. The work was commissioned by the Koussevitzky Music Foundation in 1984 and was completed in 1989. Its world premiere was performed by the pianist Paul Crossley and the London Sinfonietta conducted by Adams on November 24, 1989, in Queen Elizabeth Hall, London. The piece is dedicated to Paul Crossley. It is the first of four piano concertos by Adams, followed by Century Rolls in 1996, Must the Devil Have All the Good Tunes? in 2019, and After the Fall in 2025.

== Composition ==
The composition of Eros Piano was inspired in part by the piano concerto riverrun by the Japanese composer Toru Takemitsu. In an interview with the author Edward Strickland, Adams said "I encountered Takemitsu's riverrun, a rather modest piece about fifteen minutes long for piano and orchestra that he wrote for Peter Serkin, who played it in several American cities several years ago, but nobody seemed to have a very strong response. The English performance I found extraordinarily beautiful and listened to it many times and had the response I often do of writing a piece of my own in order to exorcise it." He added, "Eros Piano is a gloss on riverrun, as Harmonielehre is a gloss on various Romantic composers."

Eros Piano was also influenced by the music of other American composers such as the jazz pianist Bill Evans, for whom Adams and Takemitsu had a shared fondness. The composer described the piece as "a quiet, dreamy soliloquy for piano, played against a soft, lush fabric of orchestral screens and clusters." The piece is written in a single movement and has a duration of roughly 15 minutes in performance.

=== Instrumentation ===
The work is scored for solo piano and a small orchestra comprising two flutes (both doubling piccolo), two oboes, two clarinets (2nd doubling bass clarinet), two bassoons, two horns, one percussionist (vibraphone, crotales, and maracas), optional keyboard sampler, and strings.

== Reception ==
Despite being one of Adams's lesser known works, Eros Piano has been generally praised by music critics. In 1999, Allan Kozinn of The New York Times wrote, "Eros Piano extends Mr. Adams's language in a different way. Written after an evening with Toru Takemitsu, it embraces the atmospheric gracefulness of that composer's later style through inventive string voicings, and its solo piano line hints at the shapely improvisations of Bill Evans, to whom the work is in fact a tribute." Reviewing a piano reduction of Eros Piano arranged and performed by the pianist Vicki Ray in 2009, Mark Swed of the Los Angeles Times described the concerto as "neglected" and called it a "lush, torchy 1989 valentine for piano."
