= After the Fall =

After the Fall may refer to:

== Literature ==
- After the Fall, a review of September 11-related novels
- After the Fall (play), a 1964 play by Arthur Miller
- After the Fall (Sheckley), a 1980 book edited by Robert Sheckley
- Angel: After the Fall, a comic book series

== Music ==
- "After the Fall", a song by Klaus Nomi from the 1982 album Simple Man
- "After the Fall" (song), a song by Journey, 1983
- "After the Fall," a song by Elvis Costello on the album Mighty Like a Rose, 1991
- After the Fall (band), an Australian musical group begun in 2000
- After the Fall (Mary Coughlan album), 1997
- After the Fall (98 Mute album), 2002
- After the Fall (After the Fall album), 2004
- After the Fall (Keith Jarrett album), 2018
- "After the Fall", a song by Trans-Siberian Orchestra from the album Beethoven's Last Night, 2012
- After the Fall, a piano concerto by John Adams, 2024

== Film and television ==
- After the Fall (2014 film), an American film
- After the Fall (1974 film), an American television film
- After the Fall (Friday Night Lights), an episode of the TV series Friday Night Lights
- "After the Fall" (CSI episode), a CSI: Miami episode

== See also ==
- Before the Fall (disambiguation)
