= Víkingur =

Víkingur can refer to:

- The Icelandic and Faroese word for Viking
- Víkingur Ólafsson (born 1984), Icelandic pianist
- One of several European association football clubs:
  - Knattspyrnufélagið Víkingur (Víkingur Rejkyavík), an Icelandic association football club
  - Ungmennafélagið Víkingur (Víkingur Ólafsvík), Icelandic association football club
  - Víkingur (Víkingur Gøta), a Faroese association football club
