= Kseniia Sinitsyna =

Russian figure skater (born 2004)

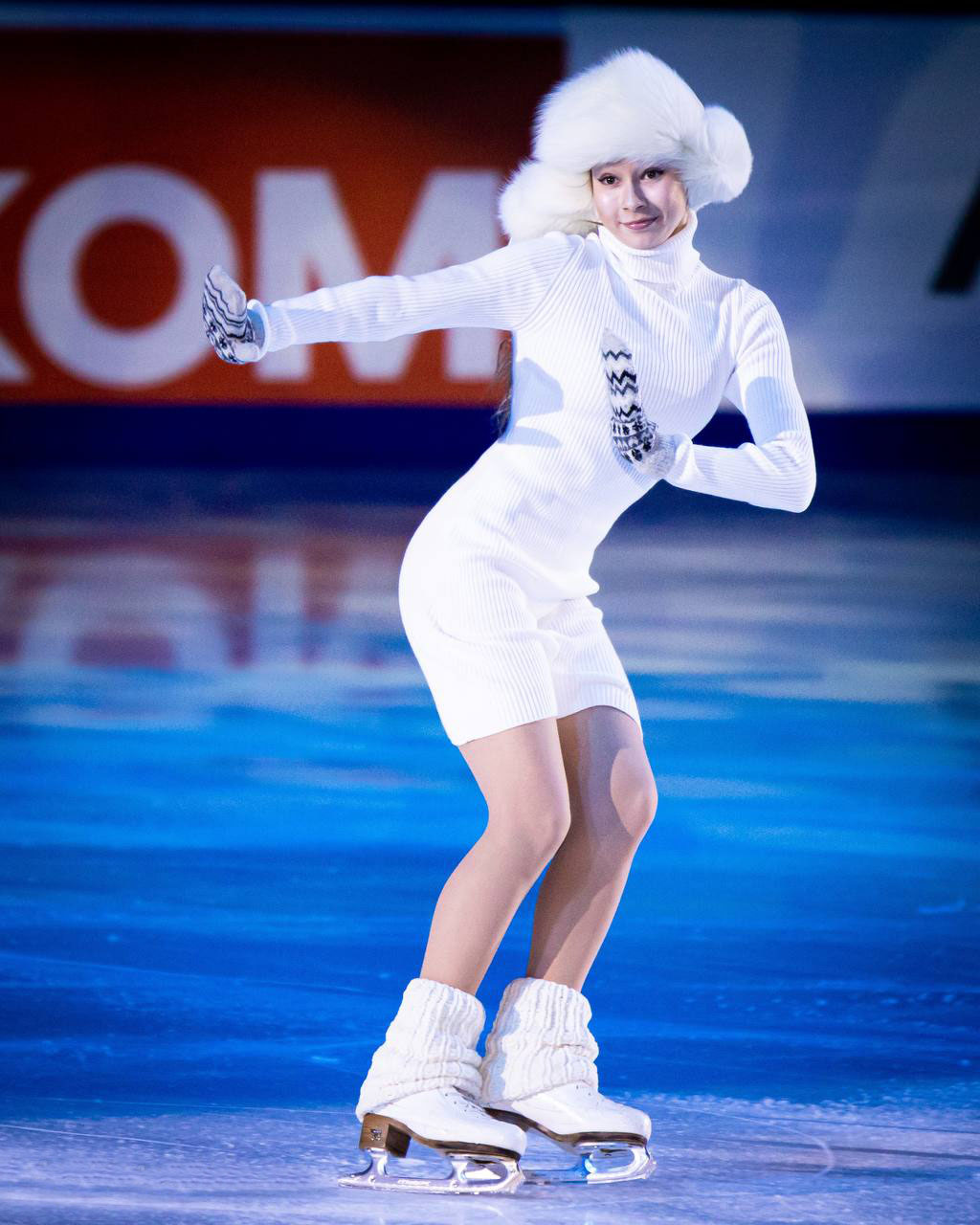
- Kseniia Sinitsyna in 2024

Personal information
- Native name: Ксения Алексеевна Синицына (Russian)
- Full name: Kseniia Alexeyevna Sinitsyna
- Other names: Ksenia/Kseniya, Ksyusha
- Born: 5 August 2004 (age 22) Tver, Russia
- Home town: Moscow, Russia
- Height: 1.52 m (5 ft 0 in)

Figure skating career
- Country: (Individual Neutral Athletes) Individual Neutral Athlete; Russia
- Discipline: Women's singles
- Coach: Evgeni Plushenko
- Skating club: Academy “Angely Plushenko”
- Began skating: 2008

Medal record
Russian Championships
Bronze medal – third place	2024 Krasnoyarsk	Singles
Winter Youth Olympics
Gold medal – first place	2020 Lausanne	Team
Silver medal – second place	2020 Lausanne	Singles

Kseniia Alexeyevna Sinitsyna (Russian: Ксения Алексеевна Синицына; born 5 August 2004) is a Russian figure skater who currently competes as an Individual Neutral Athlete. She is the 2024 Russian bronze national medalist and the 2024 Russian Cup Final bronze medalist. She is the 2020 Youth Olympic silver medalist, the 2020 Youth Olympic Champion in the team event, the 2019 JGP Italy champion, the JGP Russia silver medalist, and the 2018 JGP Lithuania bronze medalist.

== Personal life ==
Sinitsyna was born on 5 August 2004 in Tver, Russia.

== Career ==
=== Early years ===
Sinitsyna began learning to skate in 2008. She was inititally coached by Liubov Maleva at the Sports School of Olympic Reserve Sokolniki before subsequently transferring to the Sports School Snezhnye Barsy where Svetlana Panova and Tatiana Moiseeva became her coaches around 2015.

She made her national debut at the 2018 Russian Junior Championships, where she finished in ninth place.

=== 2018–2019 season: Junior international debut ===
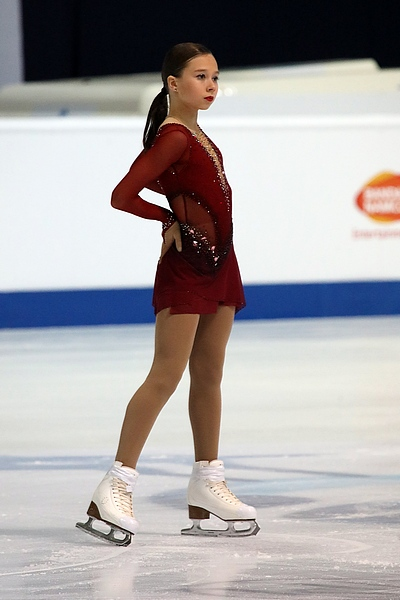
Sinitsyna at the 2019 World Junior Championships

Sinitsyna began her season by making her international debut on the 2018–19 Junior Grand Prix series, winning the bronze medal at the 2018 JGP Lithuania. She then went on to compete domestically, finishing sixth at 2018 Russian Cup Stage III, Sochi and winning bronze at 2018 Russian Cup Stage V, Moscow.

In December, Sinitsyna competed at the 2018 Russian–Chinese Winter Youth Games where she won the silver medal behind compatriot, Victoria Vasilieva. The following month, she finished fourth at the 2019 Russian Junior Championships behind Alexandra Trusova, Alena Kostornaia, and Anna Shcherbakova.

Sinitsyna was subsequently selected to represent Russia at the first Children of Asia Games, winning the bronze medal behind You Young and Alena Kanysheva.

In March, Sinitsyna was called up to compete at the World Junior Championships in Zagreb, Croatia following the withdrawal of Alena Kostornaia. Ranked fourth in the short and sixth in the free skate, Sinitsyna finished in fourth place overall.

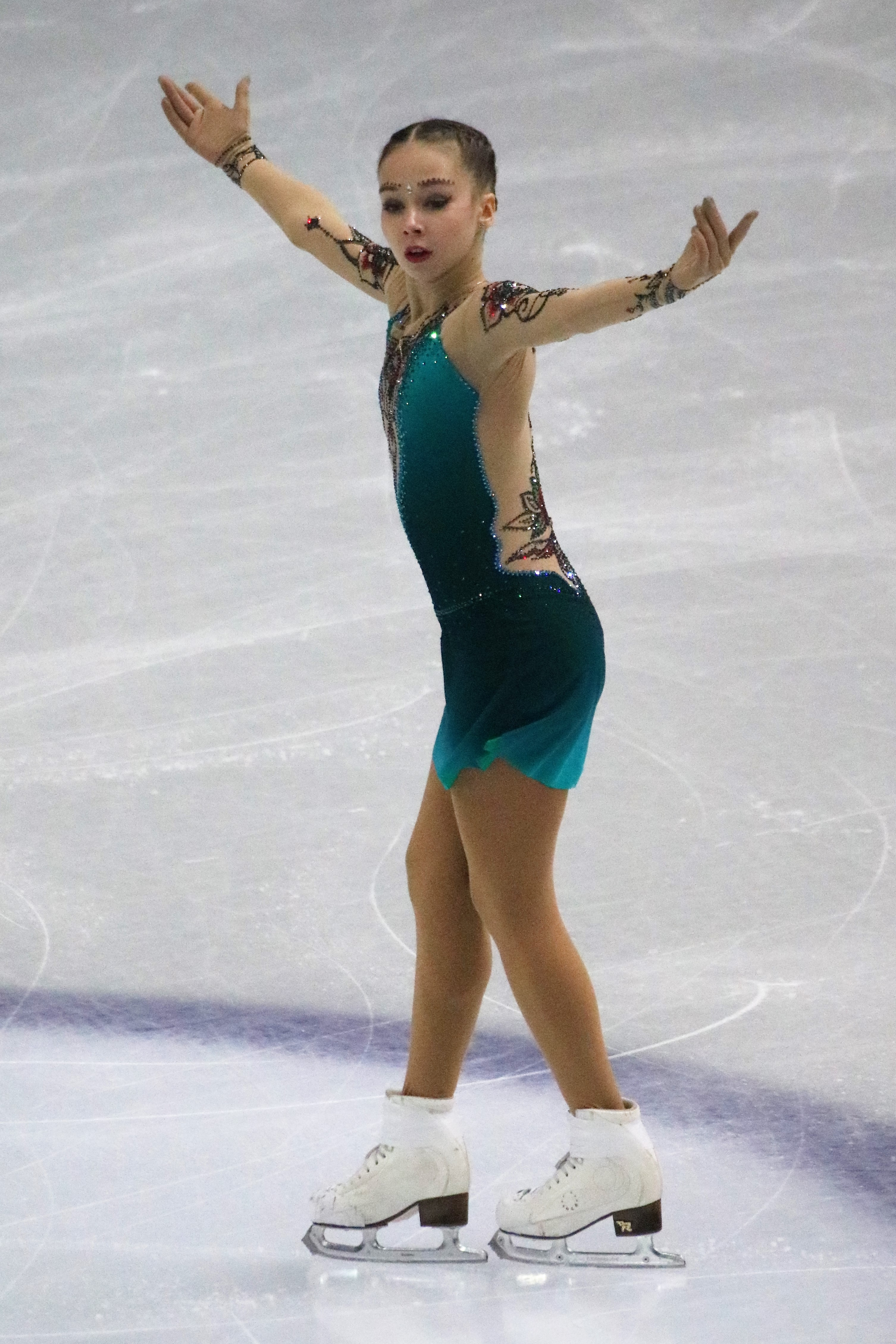
Sinitsyna during her free skate at the 2019–20 JGP Final

=== 2019–2020 season: Youth Olympics Games medals ===
Although assigned to compete at 2019 JGP United States in Lake Placid, New York, Sinitsyna was forced to withdraw due to visa issues. As a result, she was reassigned to 2019 JGP Russia, where she won the silver medal behind Kamila Valieva. Going on to compete at 2019 JGP Italy, Sinitsyna placed first in both the short program and the free skate with new personal best scores, winning the gold medal overall. These Junior Grand Prix results allowed her to qualify for the 2019–20 Junior Grand Prix Final, where she finished in fourth place. In addition, Sinitsyna won the 2019 Volvo Open Cup on the junior level one month before the Final.

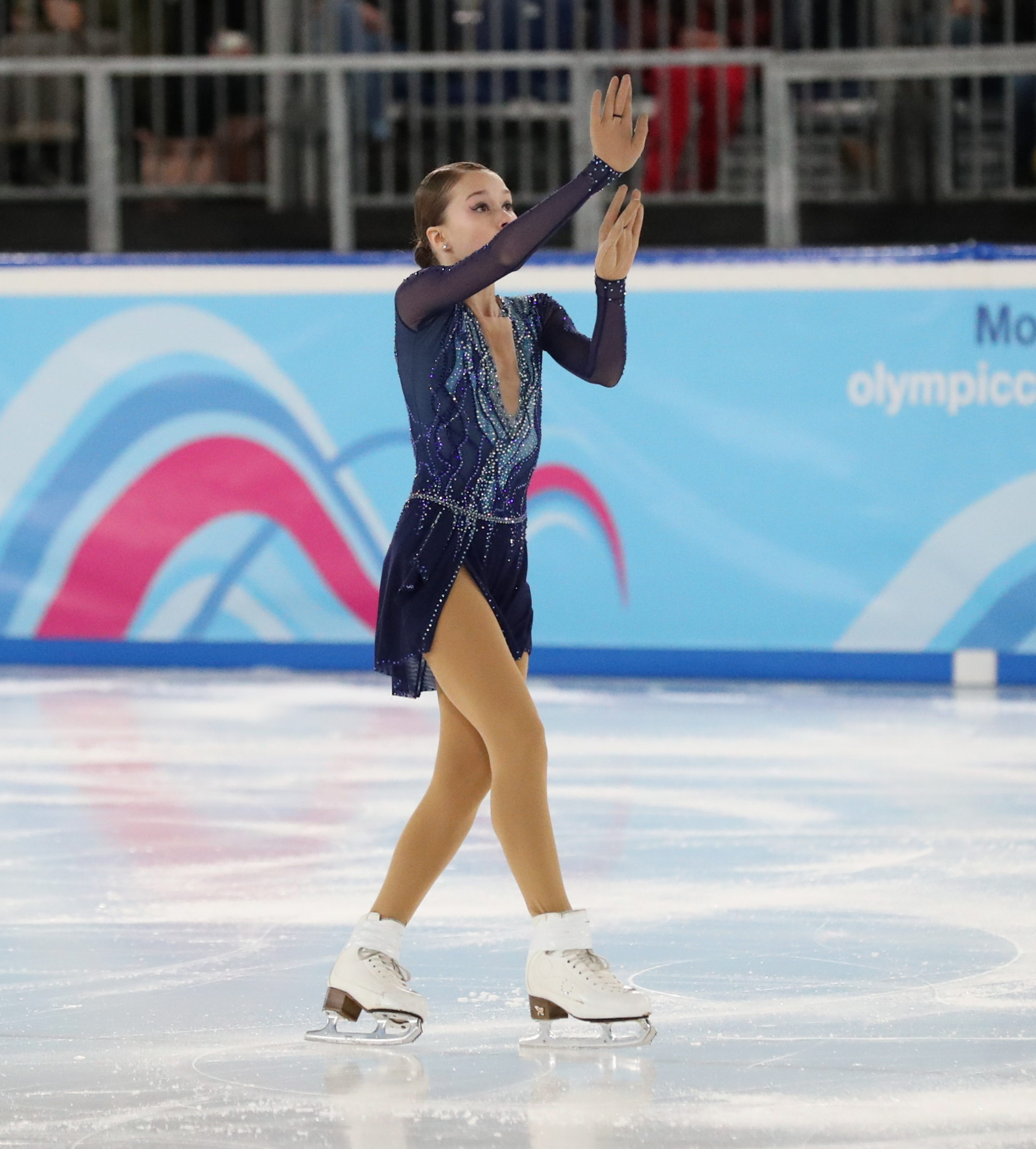
Sinitsyna performing her short program at the 2020 Winter Youth Olympics

Going on to make her senior national debut at the 2020 Russian Championships, an error in the short program led to her placing fourteenth in that segment, but she rallied back with a fourth-place free skate to finish in fifth place overall.

Named to the 2020 Winter Youth Olympic team, Sinitsyna won the silver medal in the girls' singles event behind You Young of South Korea and ahead of Russian teammate Anna Frolova. In the team event, she placed first individually to help her team (Arlet Levandi of Estonia, Alina Butaeva / Luka Berulava of Georgia, and Utana Yoshida / Shingo Nishiyama of Japan) win the gold medal.

Sinitsyna subsequently concluded her season with a seventh-place finish at the 2020 Russian Junior Championships.

=== 2020–2021 season ===
Sinitsyna injured her leg over the summer before the start of the 2020–21 season and subsequently became ill, causing her to miss the domestic fall competitive season and the 2021 Russian Championships. She returned to the competition in early February 2021, winning the domestic Prizes of Elena Tchaikovskaia competition. She attempted a quadruple toe loop for the first time at the event but popped it into a single despite landing it successfully during her warm-up. This marked the first time Sinitsyna attempted a quadruple jump in competition.

=== 2021–2022 season: Senior international debut ===
Sinitsyna debuted her programs for the 2021–22 season at the 2021 Russian Test Skate event in early September, where she skated her short program cleanly but made several mistakes in her free program, including falling on an attempted quadruple toe loop. Due to an injury, Sinitsyna and her team decided to remove the quad from her free skate in advance of her first Grand Prix assignment, 2021 Skate America.

At Skate America, Sinitsyna skated a clean short program to place third in the segment behind compatriots Alexandra Trusova and Daria Usacheva. She was fifth in the free skate, dropping to fifth place overall. She was again third after the short program at her second event, the 2021 Internationaux de France, dropping to fourth overall after the free skate with three underrotated triple jumps.

In December, Sinitsyna competed at the 2022 Russian Championships, where she finished in eighth place.

In early March 2022, the ISU banned all figure skaters and officials from Russia and Belarus from attending the World Championships due to the Russian invasion of Ukraine in late February.

=== 2022–2023 season ===
Due to Russian skaters being banned from competing at international competitions, Sinitsyna instead competed domestically on the Russian Grand Prix series. She won the bronze medal at 2022 Russian Grand Prix III, Kazan and finishing fourth at 2022 Russian Grand Prix VI, Perm.

Sinitsyna subsequently competed at the 2023 Russian Championships, finishing in seventh place overall. Although assigned to compete at the 2023 Russian Grand Prix Final in March, Sinitsyna was forced to withdraw from the event due to sustaining a fibular stress fracture.

=== 2023–2024 season: National bronze medal and Russian Grand Prix Final bronze medal ===
In September, while debuting her season's program at the Russian Test Skates, Sinitsyna fractured her metatarsal bone and as a result was forced to withdraw from 2023 Russian Grand Prix II, Omsk.

Sinitsyna made her return to competition in late November, winning gold at 2023 Russian Grand Prix V, Samara and finishing fourth at 2023 Russian Grand Prix VI, Moscow. She followed up these results with a fourth-place finish at the 2024 Russian Championships. Following bronze medalist, Kamila Valieva's, disqualification because of a doping violation, Sinitsyna was subsequently declared as the event's bronze medalist.

She then concluded her season with another bronze medal win at the 2024 Russian Grand Prix Final behind Adeliia Petrosian and Anna Frolova.

=== 2024–2025 season ===
In early October, Sinitsyna was in a car accident while on her way to compete at the Moscow Championships. According to the skater's coach, Svetlana Panova, "a reckless driver crashed into [Sinitsyna's] car." While her car was significantly damaged, Sinitsyna fortunately did not suffer any major injuries from the ordeal.

Later that same month, Sinitsyna won the bronze medal at 2024 Russian Grand Prix I, Magnitogorsk before going on to finish sixth at 2024 Russian Grand Prix IV, Moscow. In December, she finished tenth at the 2025 Russian Championships.

Sinitsyna then concluded her season with a seventh-place finish at the 2025 Russian Grand Prix Final.

=== 2025–2026 season ===
Sinitsyna began her season by competing at the early October Moscow Championships and placing first with 209.38 points, ahead of Maria Zakharova with 198.47.

Then she competed in the Russian Grand Prix series, finishing seventh at 2025 Russian Grand Prix I, Magnitogorsk and fourth at 2024 Russian Grand Prix IV, Moscow. Going on to compete at the 2026 Russian Championships, Sinitsyna finished the event in eleventh place.

Although assigned to compete at the 2026 Russian Grand Prix Final in March, Sinitsyna opted to withdraw from the event due to a back injury that had been plaguing her throughout the season.

In May, it was announced that Sinitsyna had left her longtime coaches, Svetlana Panova and Tatiana Moiseeva to train under Evgeni Plushenko at the Angels of Plushenko Academy. Sinitsyna later admitted that she had initially approached Alexei Mishin, asking if he would be willing to coach her to which Mishin ultimately declined. Because of this, she decided to reach out to Plushenko, who agreed to become her new coach. "At first, when I first started thinking about "Angels," I mentally balked," she shared. "There were some prejudices and stereotypes. But the reality turned out to be much better than I imagined. I really enjoyed the feeling of community and belonging. I didn't expect everything to turn out this way. I'm so glad I finally decided to do it. It's the best decision of my life so far."

=== 2026–2027 season ===
On 30 June 2026, the International Skating Union announced that figure skaters from Russia and Belarus would be allowed to compete at international competitions as Individual Neutral Athletes (AINs). Each of these skaters are be required to undergo an individual assessment conducted by the ISU Council to determine whether they meet the criteria for neutral status. Sinitsyna's application was approved, making her eligible to compete internationally as a neutral athlete.

Sinitsyna began her season on the Russian Grand Prix circuit, competing in stages one and two in Kazan and St Petersburg. She won bronze and gold medals respectively. Her gold medal in St Petersburg became her first domestic gold since the 2023–24 season.

== Programs ==
Season	Short program	Free skating	Exhibition
2026–2027	Vivo Per Lei by Edgar Akopyan	Tango by Edgar Akopyan	
2025–2026	Sotvoreniye mira (Creation of the World), Suite No. 3 by Andrei Petrov performed by Boys Choir of Glinka Choral College, Yuri Temirkanov, & Leningrad Philharmonic Symphony Orchestra choreo. by Vera Arutyunyan	Disco Dancer; Goron ki na kalon ki by Usha Mangeshkar & Suresh Wadkar; Jimmy Jimmy Jimmy Aaja by Parvati Khan choreo. by Maria Kasumova	
2024–2025	The Mystic's Dream by Loreena McKennitt; Spirits by Chronis Taxidis choreo. by Maria Kasumova	Shine On You Crazy Diamond by Pink Floyd choreo. by Maria Kasumova	Иван да Марья (Ivan and Marya) performed by Natalia Knyazhinskaya; Летел голубь (A Dove Was Flying) by Elena Frolova; Ой на Ивана, да на Купала (Oh, for Ivan, for Kupala) performed by Alina Lebedeva; Иван Купала (Ivan Kupala) performed by Volshebniki Dvora
2023–2024	Nocturne in F minor, Op. 55, No. 1 by Frédéric Chopin performed by Daniel Barenboim choreo. by Vera Arutyunyan	Quizás, Quizás, Quizás by Osvaldo Farrés performed by Gaby Moreno; Espiritu by Ann Reynolds & Clave Gringa choreo. by Maria Kasumova	Last Boat by Alex Khaskin; Prodigy (from Code Geass) by Kotaro Nakagawa; Кабы не было зимы (If Only There Was No Winter) by Yuri Entin & Yevgeny Krylatov performed by Valentina Tolkunova
2022–2023	Lullaby, Op. 16, No. 1 by Pyotr Ilyich Tchaikovsky choreo. by Vera Arutyunyan	Concerto in D Minor, BWV 974: II. Adagio by Johann Sebastian Bach performed by Víkingur Ólafsson; G Minor Bach by Johann Sebastian Bach performed by Jacob's Piano; Concerto for 4 Pianos in A Minor, BWV 1065: III. Allegro by Johann Sebastian Bach performed by David Fray & Orchestre national du Capitole de Toulouse choreo. by Maria Kasumova	
2021–2022	Lullaby, Op. 16, No. 1 by Pyotr Ilyich Tchaikovsky choreo. by Vera Arutyunyan	Dawn of Faith; Redemption by Eternal Eclipse; Smoke and Mirrors by Viktoria Tocca; Revolution by Eternal Eclipse choreo. by Maria Kasumova, Sergei Komolov, & Svetlana Panova	
2020–2021	Alfonsina y el mar by Ariel Ramírez & Félix Luna performed by Ane Brun choreo. by Nadia Kanaeva	Vajrasattva Mantra by Deva Premal; Wrench and Numbers (from Fargo) by Jeff Russo; Dakini: Movement IV (from Flesh and Bone) by Adam Crystal choreo. by Anna Novichkina	
2019–2020	Alfonsina y el mar by Ariel Ramírez & Félix Luna performed by Ane Brun choreo. by Nadia Kanaeva	Vajrasattva Mantra by Deva Premal; Wrench and Numbers (from Fargo) by Jeff Russo; Dakini: Movement IV (from Flesh and Bone) by Adam Crystal choreo. by Anna Novichkina	
2018–2019	Batucadas by Mitoka Samba; La Vida Es Un Carnaval by Celia Cruz; Mujer Latina by Thalía choreo. by Nadia Kanaeva	Trio élégiaque No. 2 in D Minor, Op. 9: I. Moderato by Sergei Rachmaninoff performed by Gidon Kremer, Daniil Trifonov, & Giedrė Dirvanauskaitė choreo. by Ilona Protasenya	
2017–2018	Batucadas by Mitoka Samba; La Vida Es Un Carnaval by Celia Cruz; Mujer Latina by Thalía choreo. by Nadia Kanaeva	Trio élégiaque No. 2 in D Minor, Op. 9: I. Moderato by Sergei Rachmaninoff performed by Gidon Kremer, Daniil Trifonov, & Giedrė Dirvanauskaitė choreo. by Ilona Protasenya	
2016–2017	Droit de cité (from Micmacs) by Raphaël Beau; Carrousel; Zydeko (from Quidam) by Benoît Jutras	Bahrein by Princess; Flamenco Trip Said Mrad	
2015–2016	Droit de cité (from Micmacs) by Raphaël Beau; Carrousel; Zydeko (from Quidam) by Benoît Jutras	Bahrein by Princess; Flamenco Trip Said Mrad	
2014–2015	Bepo by Peter Dranga	Elizabeth; Maria and the Violin's String by Ashram	

== Competitive highlights ==
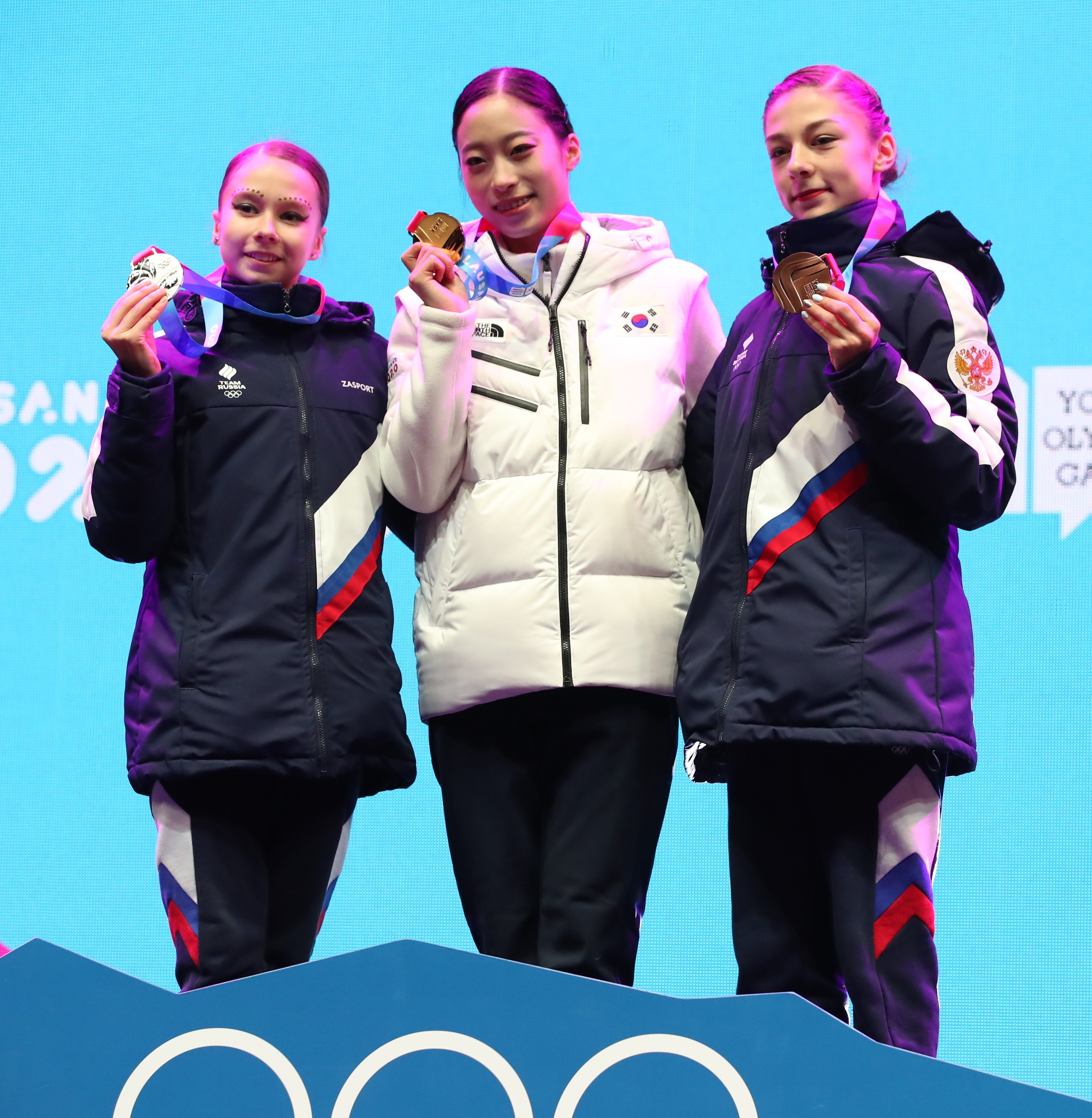
Sinitsyna (left) at the 2020 Winter Youth Olympics podium with You Young (center) and Anna Frolova (right).

- GP – Event of the ISU Grand Prix Series
- JGP – Event of the ISU Junior Grand Prix Series
- TBD – Placement to be decided

=== Skating for Russia ===
Competition placements at senior level
Season	2018–19	2019–20	2021–22	2022–23	2023–24	2024–25	2025–26	2026–27
GP France			4th					
GP Skate America			5th					
Russian Championships		5th	8th	7th	3rd	10th	11th	
Russian Grand Prix Final					3rd	7th		
Russian GP Stage 1 (Note: In 2022, the Russian Cup Stages were renamed to Russian Grand Prix Stages.)						3rd	7th	3rd
Russian GP Stage 2								1st
Russian GP Stage 3	6th			3rd				
Russian GP Stage 4						6th	4th	
Russian GP Stage 5	3rd				1st			
Russian GP Stage 6				4th	4th			

Competition placements at junior level
Season	2016–17	2017–18	2018–19	2019–20
Winter Youth Olympics				2nd
Winter Youth Olympics (Team event)				1st
World Junior Championships			4th	
Junior Grand Prix Final				4th
Russian Championships		9th	4th	7th
JGP Italy				1st
JGP Lithuania			3rd	
JGP Russia				2nd
Russian Cup Final		3rd		
Russian Cup Stage 1		3rd		
Russian Cup Stage 2	9th			
Russian Cup Stage 3		2nd		
Russian Cup Stage 5	9th			
Children of Asia Games			3rd	
Russian–Chinese Winter Youth Games			2nd	
Volvo Open Cup				1st

== Detailed results ==
Small medals for short and free programs awarded only at ISU Championships.

ISU personal best scores in the +5/-5 GOE System
Segment	Type	Score	Event
Total	TSS	215.58	2019 JGP Italy
Short program	TSS	74.65	2019 JGP Italy
Short program	TES	42.33	2019 JGP Italy
Short program	PCS	32.46	2020 Winter Youth Olympics
Free skating	TSS	140.93	2019 JGP Italy
Free skating	TES	75.44	2019 JGP Italy
Free skating	PCS	65.49	2019 JGP Italy

=== Skating for Russia ===
Results in the 2018–19 season
Date	Event	SP		FS		Total	
Date	Event	P	Score	P	Score	P	Score
16–20 Oct 2018	(Russia) 2018 Russian Cup Stage III, Sochi	6	63.59	6	124.02	6	187.61
20–24 Nov 2018	(Russia) 2018 Russian Cup Stage V, Moscow	7	58.28	2	140.37	3	198.65

Results in the 2019–20 season
Date	Event	SP		FS		Total	
Date	Event	P	Score	P	Score	P	Score
24–29 Dec 2019	(Russia) 2020 Russian Championships	14	59.72	4	143.24	5	202.96

Results in the 2021–22 season
Date	Event	SP		FS		Total	
Date	Event	P	Score	P	Score	P	Score
20–24 Oct 2021	(United States) 2021 Skate America	3	71.51	5	134.25	5	205.76
19–21 Nov 2021	2021 Internationaux de France	3	69.89	6	128.87	4	198.76
22–24 Dec 2021	(Russia) 2022 Russian Championships	8	70.75	9	133.86	8	204.61

Results in the 2022–23 season
Date	Event	SP		FS		Total	
Date	Event	P	Score	P	Score	P	Score
4–7 Nov 2022	(Russia) 2022 Russian Grand Prix III, Kazan	3	70.54	2	137.01	3	207.55
28–30 Nov 2022	(Russia) 2022 Russian Grand Prix VI, Perm	3	70.94	4	136.73	4	207.67
20–26 Dec 2022	(Russia) 2023 Russian Championships	6	74.89	9	136.63	7	211.52

Results in the 2023–24 season
Date	Event	SP		FS		Total	
Date	Event	P	Score	P	Score	P	Score
17–20 Nov 2023	(Russia) 2023 Russian Grand Prix V, Samara	1	73.77	1	142.31	1	216.08
24–27 Nov 2023	(Russia) 2023 Russian Grand Prix VI, Moscow	6	65.46	3	139.69	4	205.15
20–24 Dec 2023	(Russia) 2024 Russian Championships	4	75.21	5	148.60	3	223.81
14–19 Feb 2024	(Russia) 2024 Russian Grand Prix Final	3	75.75	3	148.90	3	224.65

Results in the 2024–25 season
Date	Event	SP		FS		Total	
Date	Event	P	Score	P	Score	P	Score
25–28 Oct 2024	(Russia) 2024 Russian Grand Prix I, Magnitogorsk	3	65.27	2	135.65	3	200.92
15–18 Nov 2024	(Russia) 2024 Russian Grand Prix IV, Moscow	8	55.79	5	128.74	6	184.53
18–23 Dec 2024	(Russia) 2025 Russian Championships	9	69.99	10	133.94	10	203.93
13–17 Feb 2025	(Russia) 2025 Russian Grand Prix Final	12	60.84	4	142.42	7	203.26

Results in the 2025–26 season
Date	Event	SP		FS		Total	
Date	Event	P	Score	P	Score	P	Score
24–27 Oct 2025	(Russia) 2025 Russian Grand Prix I, Magnitogorsk	7	64.79	5	134.12	7	198.91
14–17 Nov 2025	(Russia) 2025 Russian Grand Prix IV, Moscow	4	67.54	4	131.50	4	199.04
18–21 Dec 2025	(Russia) 2026 Russian Championships	12	67.96	11	130.50	11	198.46

Results in the 2026–27 season
Date	Event	SP		FS		Total	
Date	Event	P	Score	P	Score	P	Score
16–19 October, 2026	(Russia) 2026 Russian Grand Prix I, Kazan	6	62.88	2	136.95	3	199.83
22–26 October, 2026	(Russia) 2026 Russian Grand Prix, St. Petersburg	1	74.29	2	131.05	1	205.34

=== Junior level ===
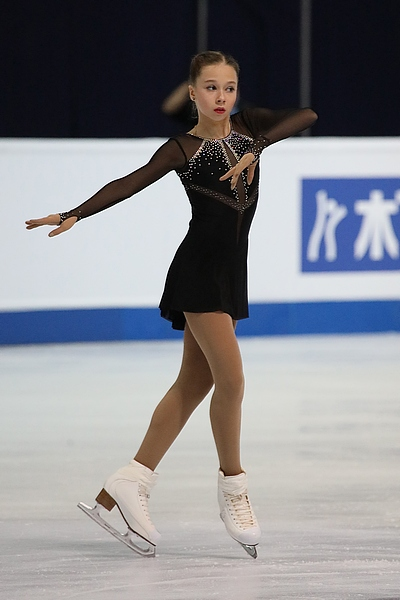
Sinitsyna at the 2019 World Junior Championships

Results in the 2016–17 season
Date	Event	SP		FS		Total	
Date	Event	P	Score	P	Score	P	Score
11–15 Oct 2016	(Russia) 2016 Russian Cup Stage II, Yoshkar-Ola	5	59.26	10	95.59	9	154.85
2–6 Dec 2016	(Russia) 2016 Russian Cup Stage V, Moscow	16	45.74	8	101.11	9	146.85

Results in the 2017–18 season
Date	Event	SP		FS		Total	
Date	Event	P	Score	P	Score	P	Score
15–19 Sep 2017	(Russia) 2017 Russian Cup Stage I, Sysran	3	63.26	4	114.42	3	177.68
27–31 Oct 2017	(Russia) 2017 Russian Cup Stage III, Sochi	2	67.54	2	126.23	2	193.77
23–26 Jan 2018	(Russia) 2019 Russian Junior Championships	10	67.46	10	124.45	9	191.91
19–23 Feb 2018	(Russia) 2019 Russian Cup Final	1	75.00	5	129.36	3	204.36

Results in the 2018–19 season
Date	Event	SP		FS		Total	
Date	Event	P	Score	P	Score	P	Score
5–8 Sep 2018	2018 JGP Lithuania	2	67.12	3	120.79	3	187.91
14–18 Dec 2018	(Russia) 2018 Russian–Chinese Winter Youth Games	3	62.04	2	125.10	2	187.14
31 Jan – 4 Feb 2019	(Russia) 2019 Russian Junior Championships	4	73.31	4	139.47	4	212.78
13–15 Feb 2019	(Russia) 2019 Children of Asia Games	6	61.26	1	136.87	3	198.13
4–10 Mar 2019	(Croatia) 2019 World Junior Championships	4	66.52	6	122.32	4	188.84

Results in the 2019–20 season
Date	Event	SP		FS		Total	
Date	Event	P	Score	P	Score	P	Score
11–14 Sep 2019	2019 JGP Russia	2	73.04	3	131.21	2	204.25
2–5 Oct 2019	2019 JGP Italy	1	74.65	1	140.93	1	215.58
5–10 Nov 2019	(Latvia) 2019 Volvo Open Cup	6	54.35	1	122.22	1	176.57
5–8 Dec 2019	(Italy) 2019–20 Junior Grand Prix Final	3	69.40	5	126.17	4	195.57
10–15 Jan 2020	(Switzerland) 2020 Winter Youth Olympics	2	71.77	2	128.26	2	200.03
Jan 15 2020	(Switzerland) 2020 Winter Youth Olympics (Team event)	—N/a	—N/a	1	127.63	1	127.63
4–8 Feb 2020	(Russia) 2020 Russian Junior Championships	11	64.60	6	135.81	7	200.41
