= Azerbaijan at the 2020 Winter Youth Olympics =

- Flag of Azerbaijan
- IOC code: AZE
- NOC: Azerbaijan Olympic Committee
- Website: www.noc-aze.org

in Lausanne
- Competitors: 1 in 1 sport
- Flag bearer: Ekaterina Ryabova
- Medals: Gold 0 Silver 0 Bronze 0 Total 0

Winter Youth Olympics appearances (overview)
- 2020; 2024

Azerbaijan competed at the 2020 Winter Youth Olympics in Lausanne, Switzerland from 9 to 22 January 2020. This was also the first time that Azerbaijan qualified to compete at the Winter Youth Olympic Games.

Azerbaijan made it Winter Youth Olympics debut.

== Figure skating ==
Two Azerbaijanis figure skaters achieved quota places for Azerbaijan based on the results of the 2019 World Junior Figure Skating Championships.

Singles

Athlete	Event	SP		FS		Total	
Athlete	Event	Points	Rank	Points	Rank	Points	Rank
Ekaterina Ryabova	Girls' singles	59.30	9	110.07	8	169.37	8

== See also ==
- Azerbaijan at the 2020 Summer Olympics
