= After the Fall (Adams) =

Piano concerto by John Adams

- by John Adams
- Period: Contemporary
- Composed: 2024
- Duration: c. 25 minutes
- Scoring: Orchestra

Premiere
- Date: January 16, 2025
- Location: Louise M. Davies Symphony Hall, San Francisco
- Conductor: David Robertson
- Performers: San Francisco Symphony, Víkingur Ólafsson

After the Fall is a piano concerto by the American composer John Adams written for pianist Víkingur Ólafsson. It had its world premiere with the San Francisco Symphony at Louise M. Davies Symphony Hall on January 16, 2025, under David Robertson.

== Composition ==
=== Background ===
Adams composed the piece while Víkingur Ólafsson was on tour playing Johann Sebastian Bach's Goldberg Variations. The piece makes reference to the C minor prelude from Bach's The Well-Tempered Clavier. According to Adams, "something of Bach was bound to leak into my piece, I guess." Adams was also inspired by Víkingur's interpretation of Must the Devil Have All the Good Tunes?.

The title makes reference to the piano concerto No Such Spring by Adams' son Samuel Adams.

=== Instrumentation ===
The work is scored for solo piano and an orchestra with three flutes, two oboes, two clarinets, bass clarinet, two bassoons, four horns, two trumpets, three trombones, three percussionists, two harps, celesta, and strings.

== Reception ==
Lisa Hirsch of San Francisco Chronicle called After the Fall "a terrific addition to the composer’s catalog, a piece that will likely be performed and pondered for decades." Gabe Meline wrote for KQED that After the Fall is "a remarkable composition, one which unties all the knots of his previous piano concerto." Richard Ginell for Classical Voice North America called the piece "less boisterous, more flowing, immediately attractive" than Adams' two prior piano concertos.
