= Figure skating at the 2020 Winter Youth Olympics – Girls' singles =

Girls' singles at the III Winter Youth Olympic Games
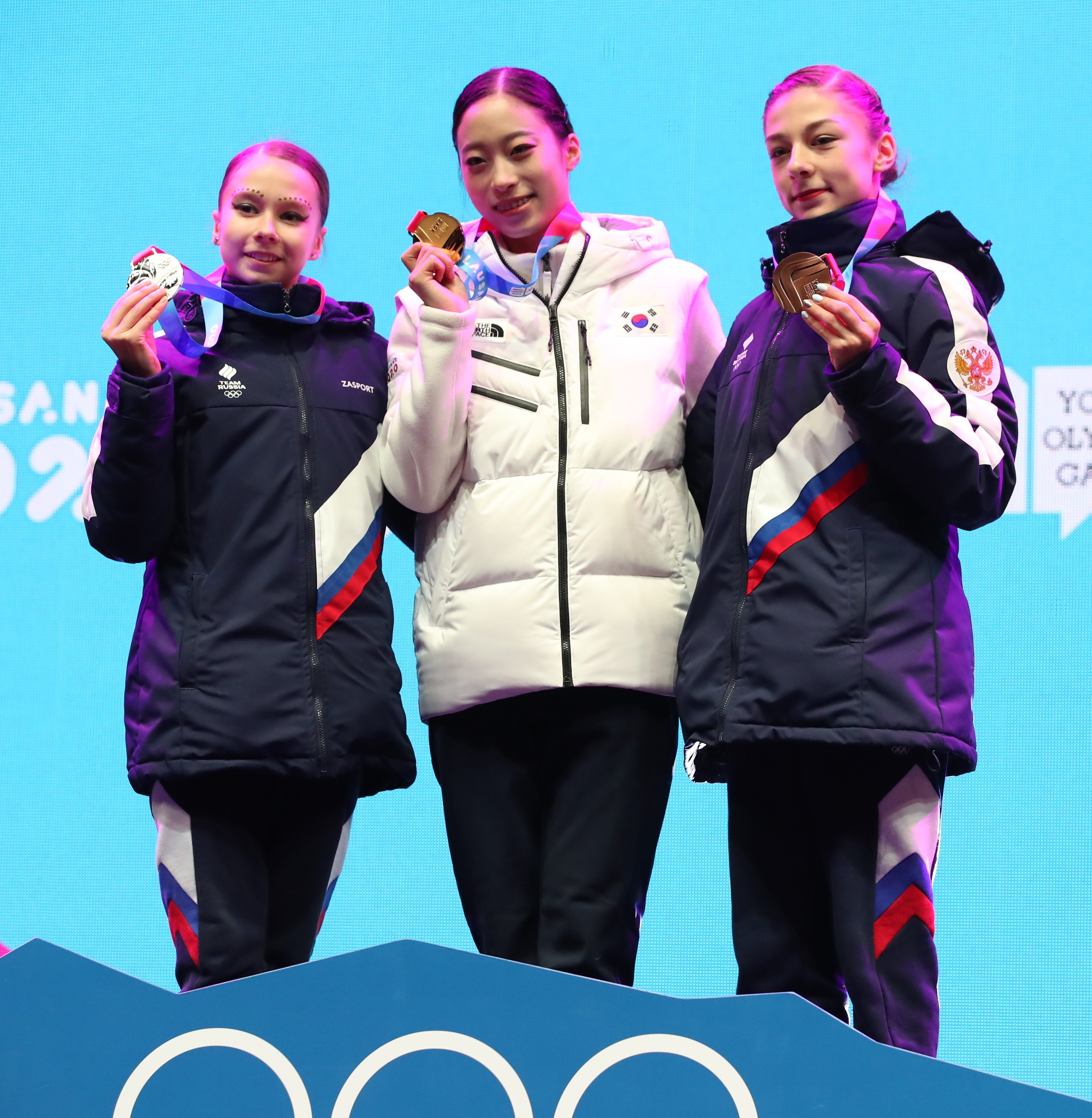
- Venue: Lausanne Skating Arena
- Dates: 11, 13 January
- Competitors: 16 from 14 nations
- Winning score: 214.00

Medalists
1st place, gold medalist(s)		You Young	South Korea
2nd place, silver medalist(s)		Ksenia Sinitsyna	Russia
3rd place, bronze medalist(s)		Anna Frolova	Russia

The girls' singles competition of the 2020 Winter Youth Olympics was held at the Lausanne Skating Arena on 11 January (short program) and 13 January 2020 (free skate).

== Results ==
=== Short program ===
The short program was held on 11 January at 16:10.

Pl.	Name	Nation	TSS	TES	PCS	SS	TR	PE	CH	IN	Ded	StN
1	You Young	South Korea	73.51	40.25	33.26	8.32	8.04	8.46	8.39	8.36	0.00	15
2	Ksenia Sinitsyna	Russia	71.77	39.31	32.46	8.07	8.00	8.14	8.11	8.25	0.00	11
3	Anna Frolova	Russia	69.07	39.33	29.74	7.43	7.32	7.46	7.46	7.50	0.00	10
4	Mana Kawabe	Japan	65.84	36.75	29.09	7.29	7.07	7.39	7.39	7.29	0.00	7
5	Alina Urushadze	Georgia	63.10	34.16	28.94	7.25	7.00	7.21	7.39	7.32	0.00	16
6	Alessia Tornaghi	Italy	62.19	34.33	27.86	6.93	6.75	7.07	7.04	7.04	0.00	14
7	Audrey Shin	United States	60.36	33.45	26.91	6.71	6.54	6.64	6.86	6.89	0.00	2
8	Maïa Mazzara	France	59.48	33.88	25.60	6.46	6.07	6.54	6.46	6.46	0.00	9
9	Ekaterina Ryabova	Azerbaijan	59.30	31.72	27.58	6.86	6.64	6.82	7.11	7.04	0.00	13
10	Kate Wang	United States	54.75	30.74	24.01	6.11	5.82	6.04	6.07	5.96	0.00	6
11	Regina Schermann	Hungary	50.62	27.36	23.26	5.86	5.64	5.79	5.96	5.82	0.00	5
12	Catherine Carle	Canada	49.57	25.49	24.08	6.18	5.86	5.93	6.18	5.96	0.00	1
13	Anaïs Coraducci	Switzerland	48.03	25.54	23.49	5.86	5.75	5.79	6.04	5.93	1.00	8
14	Eva-Lotta Kiibus	Estonia	46.63	22.24	25.39	6.39	6.25	6.14	6.57	6.39	1.00	12
15	Nella Pelkonen	Finland	45.13	23.62	21.51	5.54	5.18	5.43	5.43	5.32	0.00	3
16	Ivelina Baycheva	Bulgaria	43.90	22.02	21.88	5.50	5.39	5.46	5.61	5.39	0.00	4

=== Free skating ===
The free skating was held on 13 January at 14:30.

Pl.	Name	Nation	TSS	TES	PCS	SS	TR	PE	CH	IN	Ded	StN
1	You Young	South Korea	140.49	73.11	67.38	8.57	8.57	8.57	8.43	8.43	0.00	16
2	Ksenia Sinitsyna	Russia	128.26	64.88	64.38	8.04	7.96	7.96	8.14	8.14	1.00	15
3	Mana Kawabe	Japan	119.38	60.95	59.43	7.64	7.21	7.43	7.50	7.36	1.00	13
4	Anna Frolova	Russia	118.65	61.05	59.60	7.57	7.43	7.29	7.50	7.46	2.00	14
5	Alessia Tornaghi	Italy	116.41	58.13	58.28	7.25	7.11	7.39	7.39	7.29	0.00	11
6	Alina Urushadze	Georgia	116.40	56.83	59.57	7.36	7.18	7.46	7.61	7.61	0.00	12
7	Audrey Shin	United States	116.31	60.73	56.58	7.11	6.82	7.11	7.18	7.14	1.00	10
8	Ekaterina Ryabova	Azerbaijan	110.07	56.14	53.93	6.82	6.43	6.82	6.82	6.82	0.00	9
9	Maïa Mazzara	France	106.68	54.87	52.81	6.71	6.43	6.61	6.61	6.64	1.00	8
10	Anaïs Coraducci	Switzerland	102.86	53.50	50.36	6.25	6.18	6.25	6.36	6.43	1.00	4
11	Catherine Carle	Canada	93.85	48.08	47.77	6.21	5.79	5.82	6.04	6.00	2.00	3
12	Eva-Lotta Kiibus	Estonia	92.07	46.63	47.44	6.25	5.82	5.61	6.04	5.93	2.00	2
13	Regina Schermann	Hungary	91.20	45.99	47.21	6.04	5.86	5.68	6.04	5.89	2.00	7
14	Kate Wang	United States	86.42	40.68	46.74	6.00	5.79	5.71	6.00	5.71	1.00	6
15	Ivelina Baycheva	Bulgaria	84.93	41.07	44.86	5.75	5.50	5.57	5.68	5.54	1.00	5
16	Nella Pelkonen	Finland	73.29	32.52	41.77	5.43	5.21	4.96	5.39	5.11	1.00	1

=== Overall ===
Rank	Name	Nation	Total points	SP		FS	
1	You Young	South Korea	214.00	1	73.51	1	140.49
2	Ksenia Sinitsyna	Russia	200.03	2	71.77	2	128.26
3	Anna Frolova	Russia	187.72	3	69.07	4	118.65
4	Mana Kawabe	Japan	185.22	4	65.84	3	119.38
5	Alina Urushadze	Georgia	179.50	5	63.10	6	116.40
6	Alessia Tornaghi	Italy	178.60	6	62.19	5	116.41
7	Audrey Shin	United States	176.67	7	60.36	7	116.31
8	Ekaterina Ryabova	Azerbaijan	169.37	9	59.30	8	110.07
9	Maïa Mazzara	France	166.16	8	59.48	9	106.68
10	Anaïs Coraducci	Switzerland	150.89	13	48.03	10	102.86
11	Catherine Carle	Canada	143.42	12	49.57	11	93.85
12	Regina Schermann	Hungary	141.82	11	50.62	13	91.20
13	Kate Wang	United States	141.17	10	54.75	14	86.42
14	Eva-Lotta Kiibus	Estonia	138.70	14	46.63	12	92.07
15	Ivelina Baycheva	Bulgaria	128.83	16	43.90	15	84.93
16	Nella Pelkonen	Finland	118.42	15	45.13	16	73.29

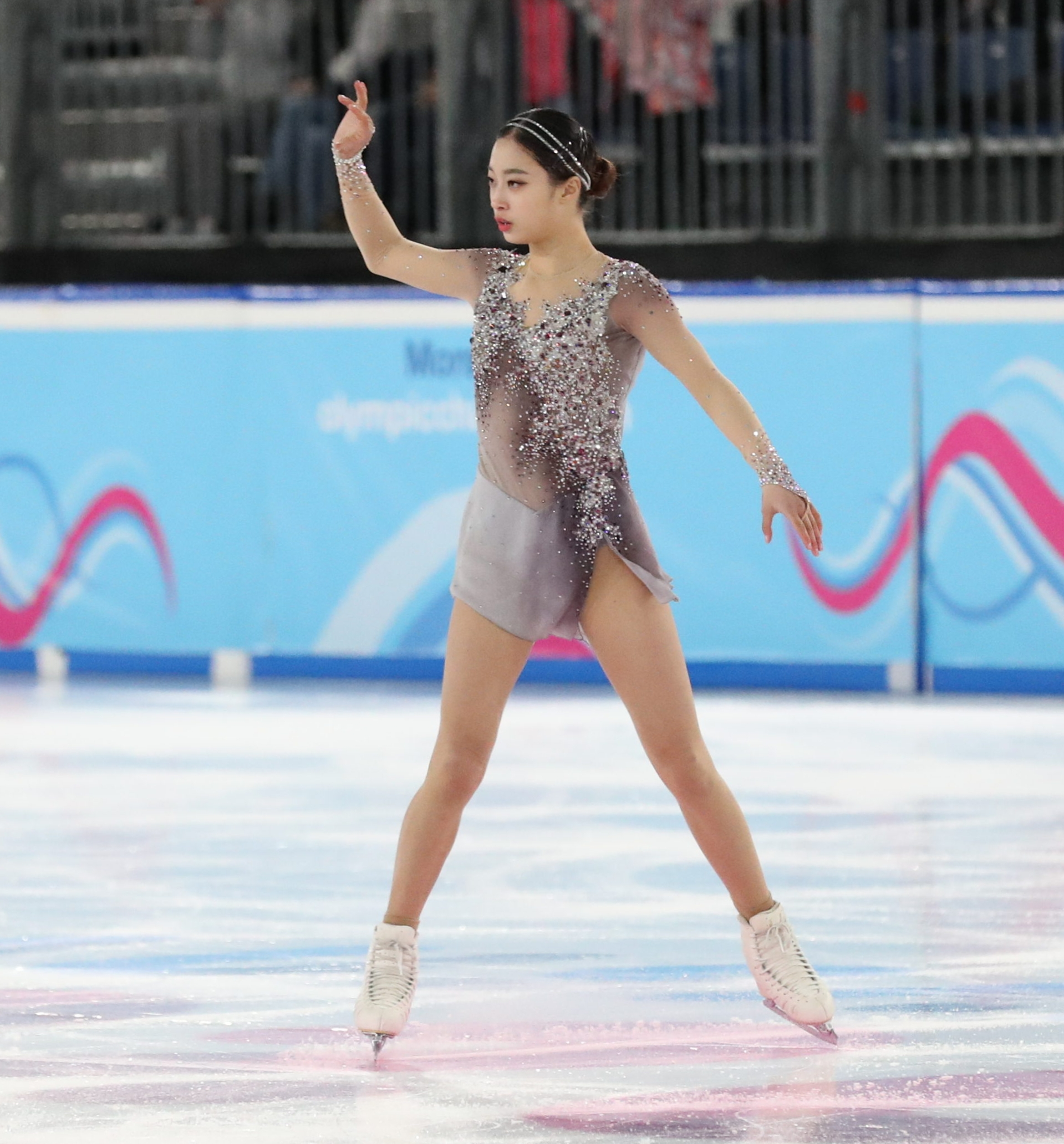
(South Korea) You Young

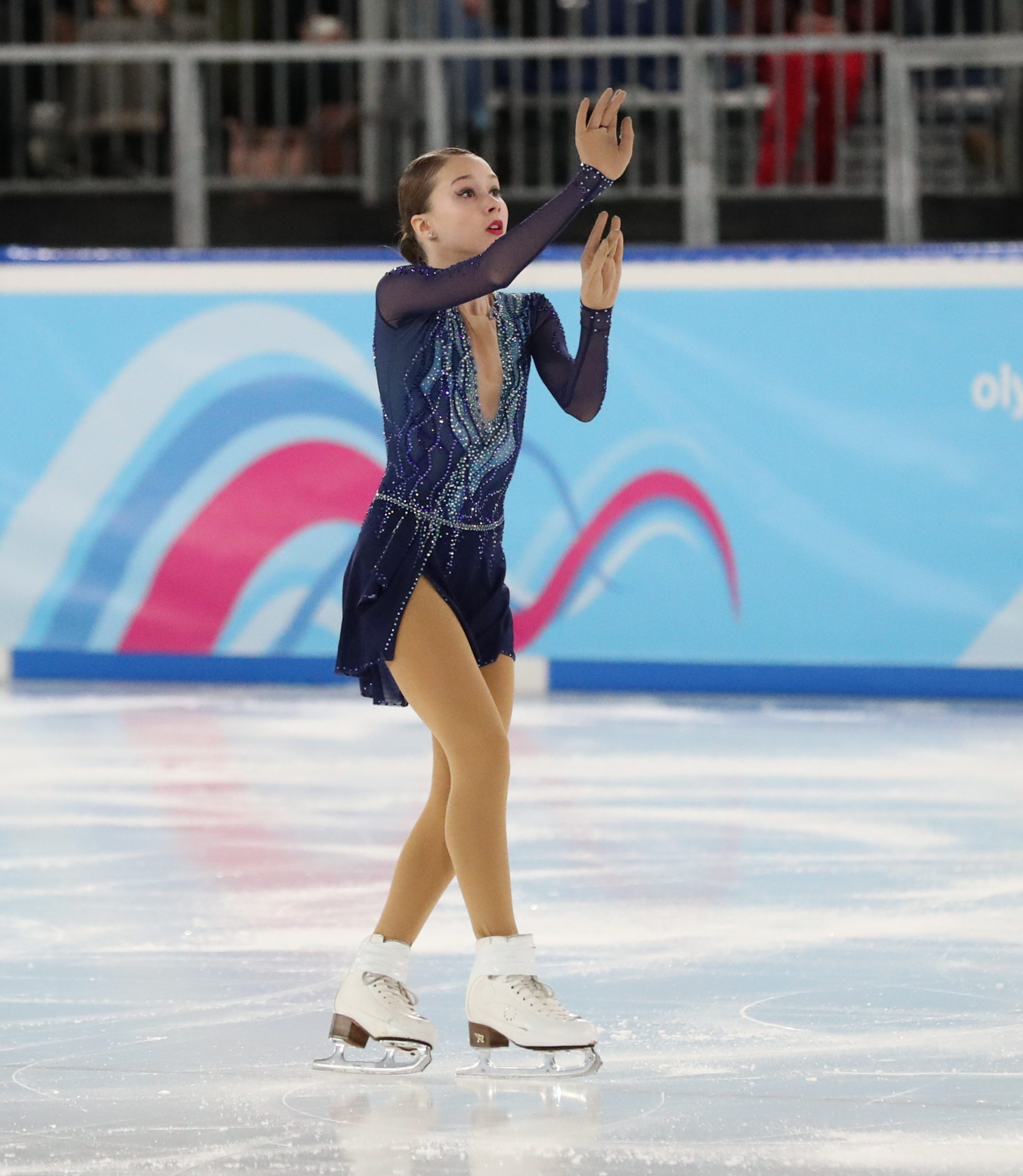
(Russia) Ksenia Sinitsyna

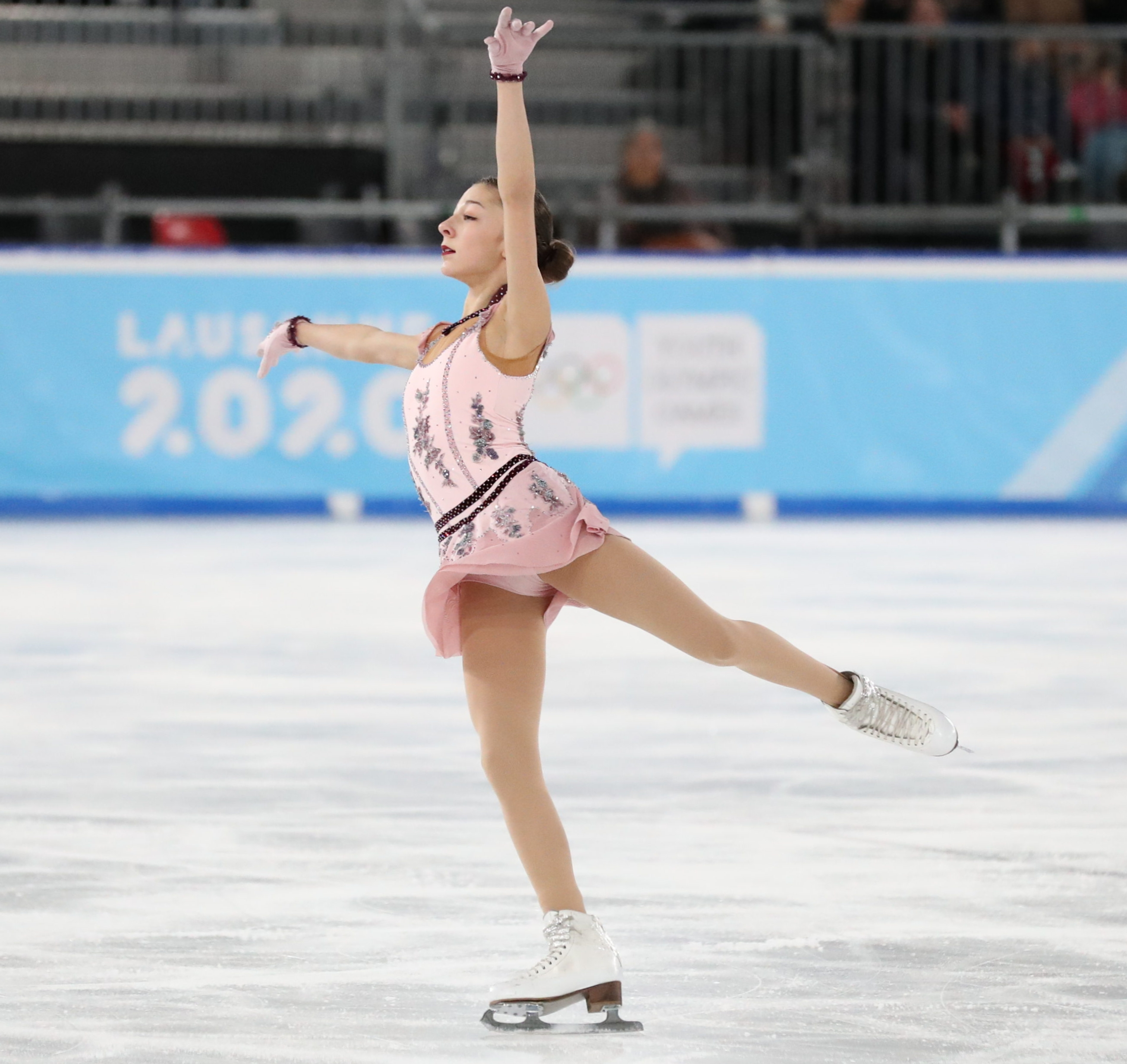
(Russia) Anna Frolova

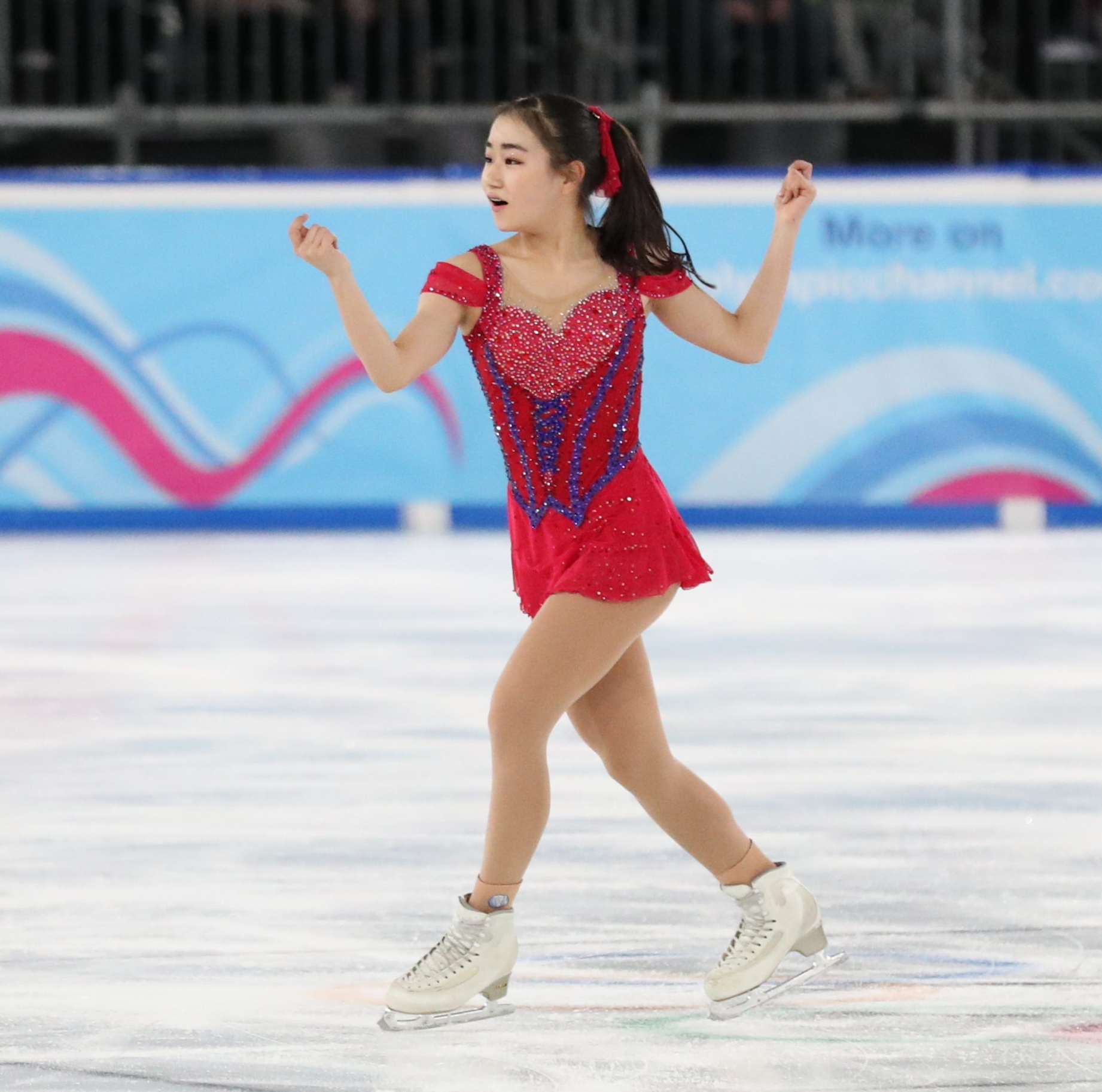
(Japan) Mana Kawabe

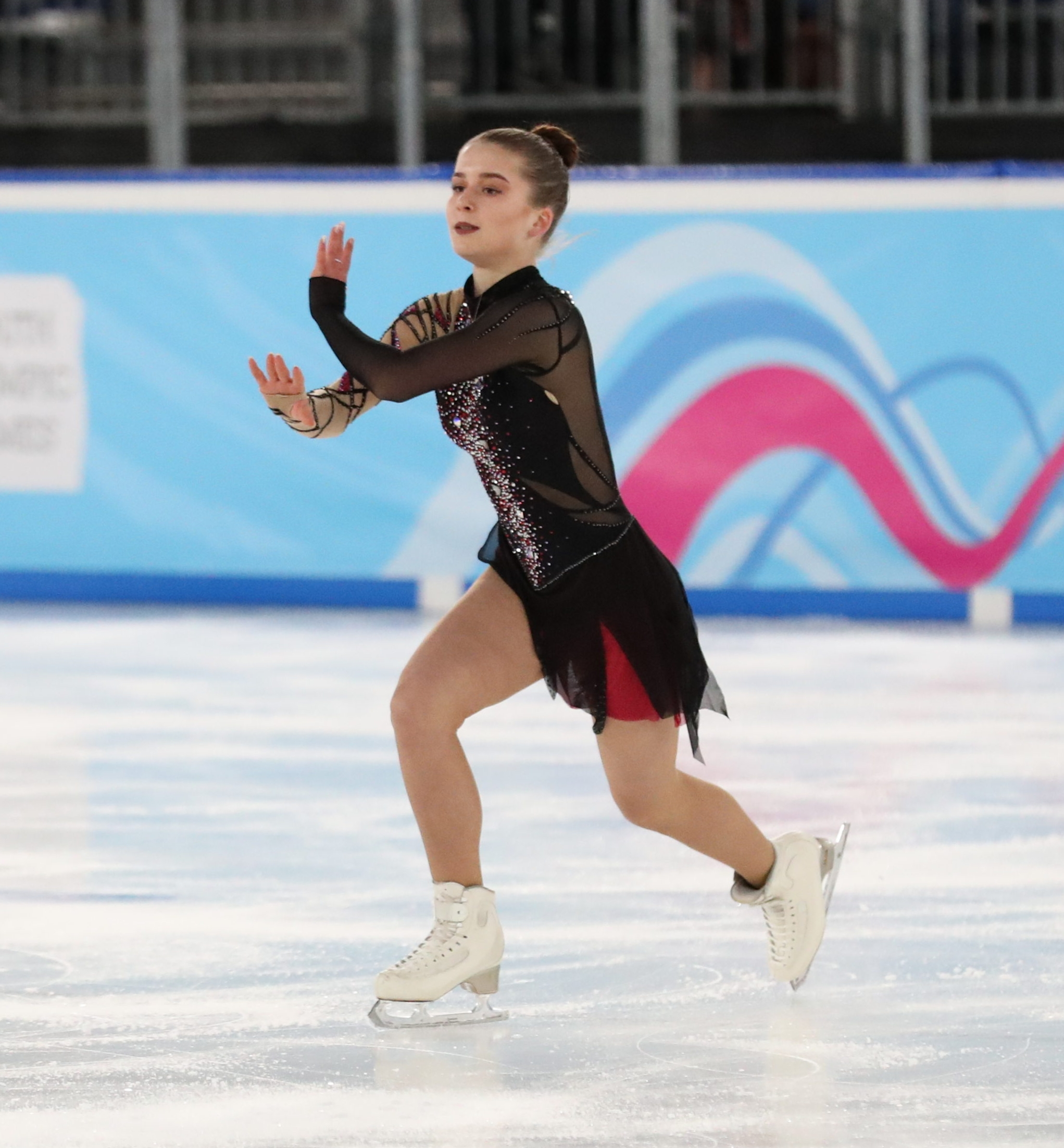
(Georgia (country)) Alina Urushadze

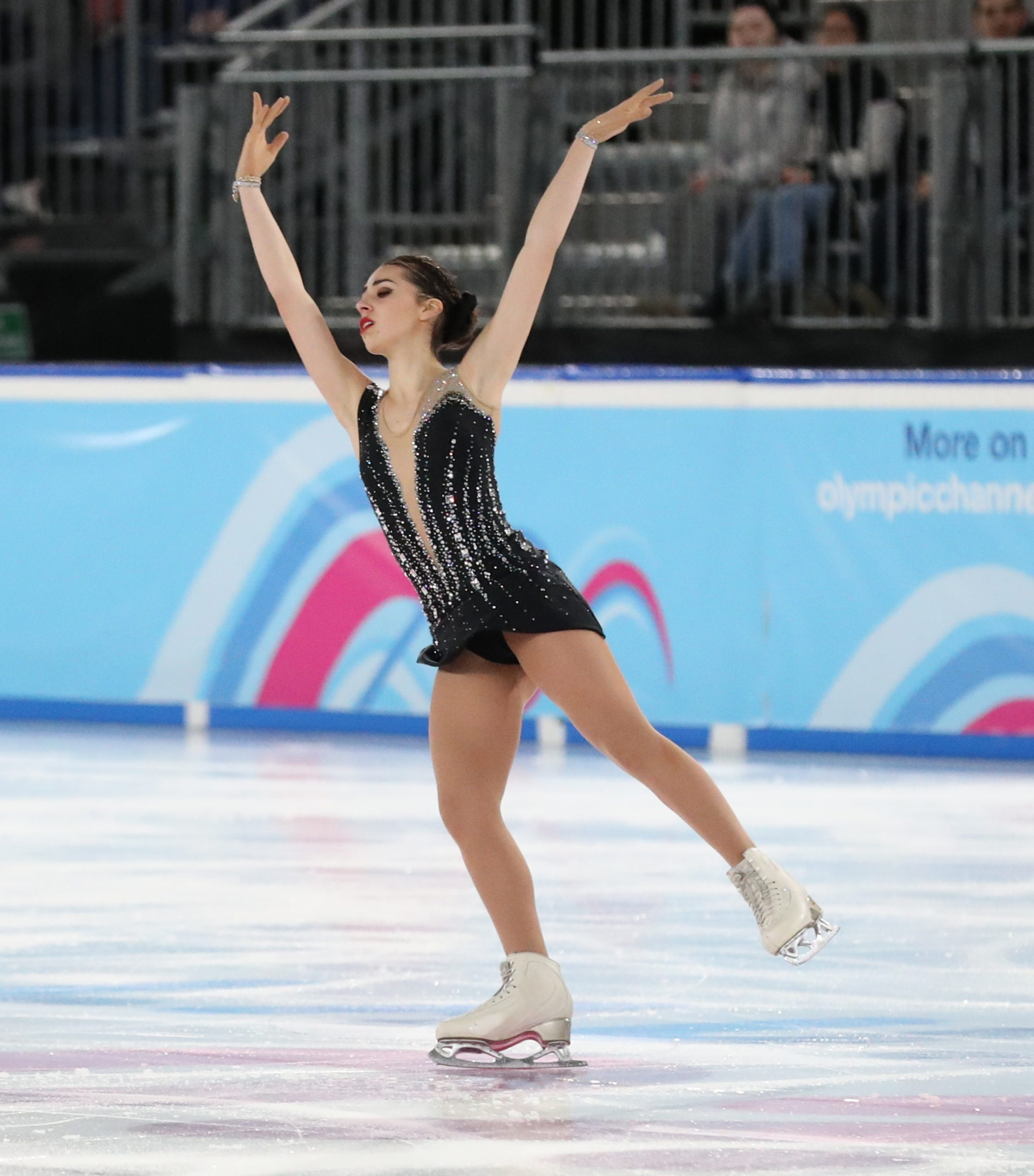
(Italy) Alessia Tornaghi

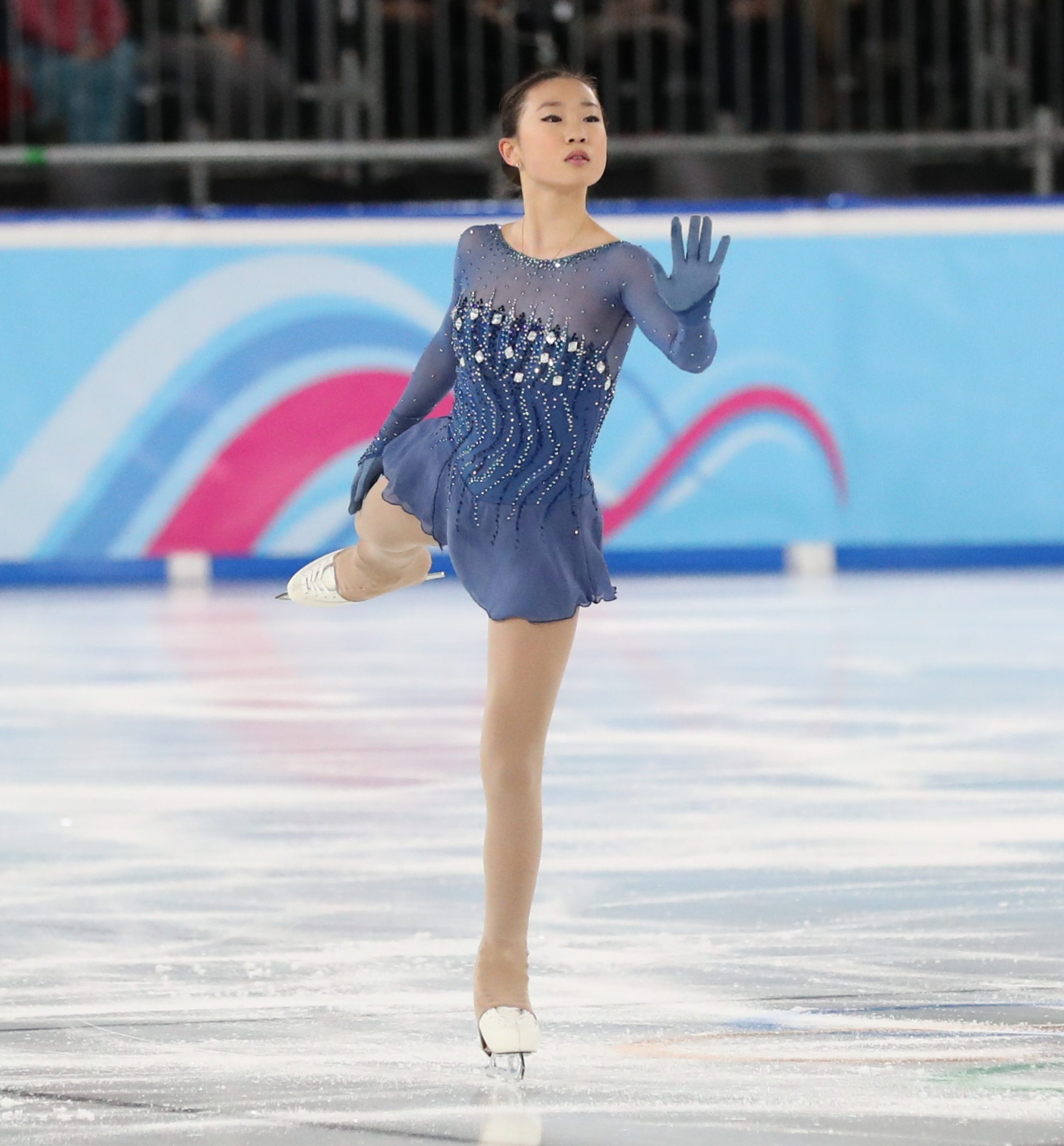
(United States) Audrey Shin

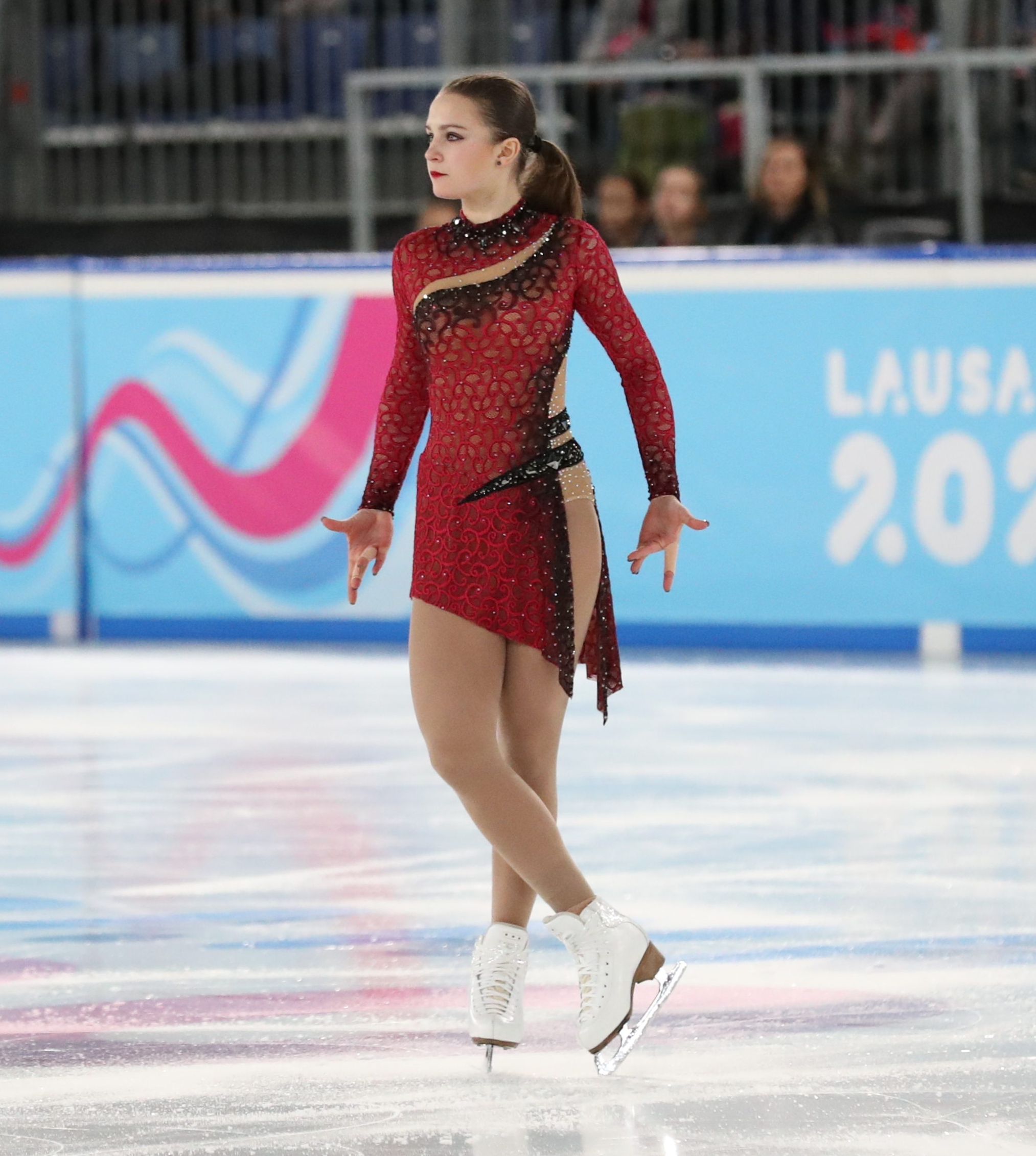
(Azerbaijan) Ekaterina Ryabova

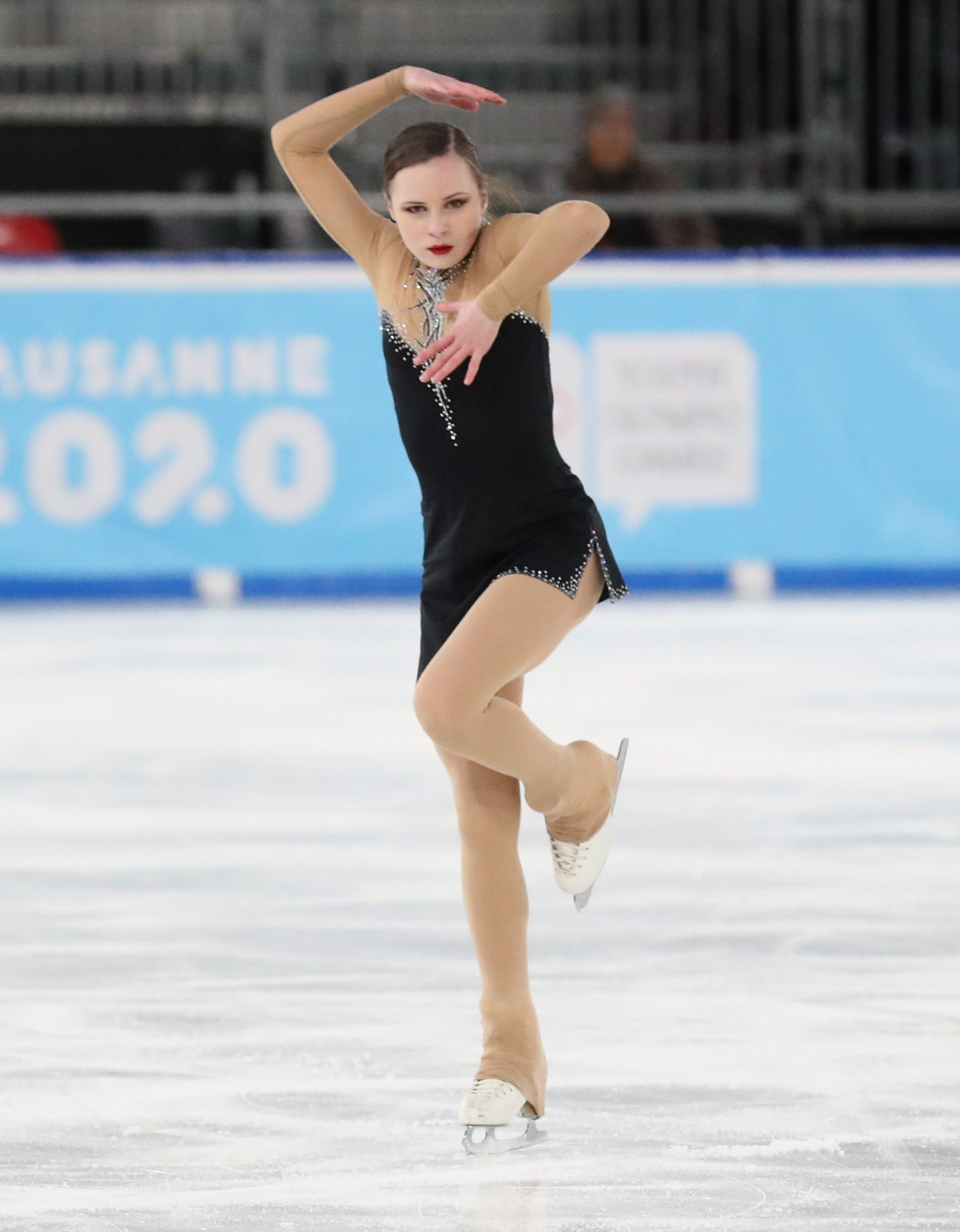
(France) Maïa Mazzara

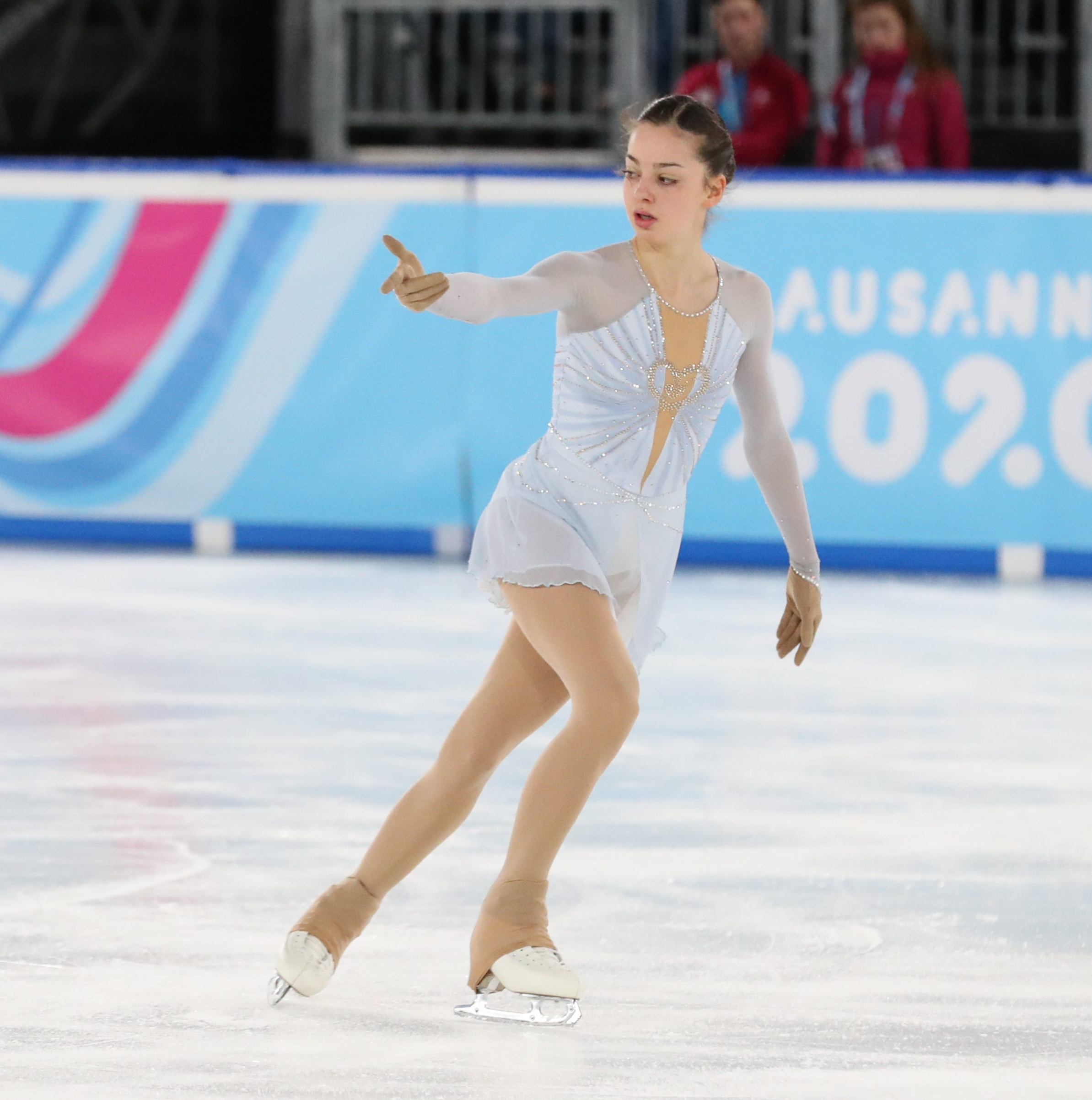
(Switzerland) Anaïs Coraducci

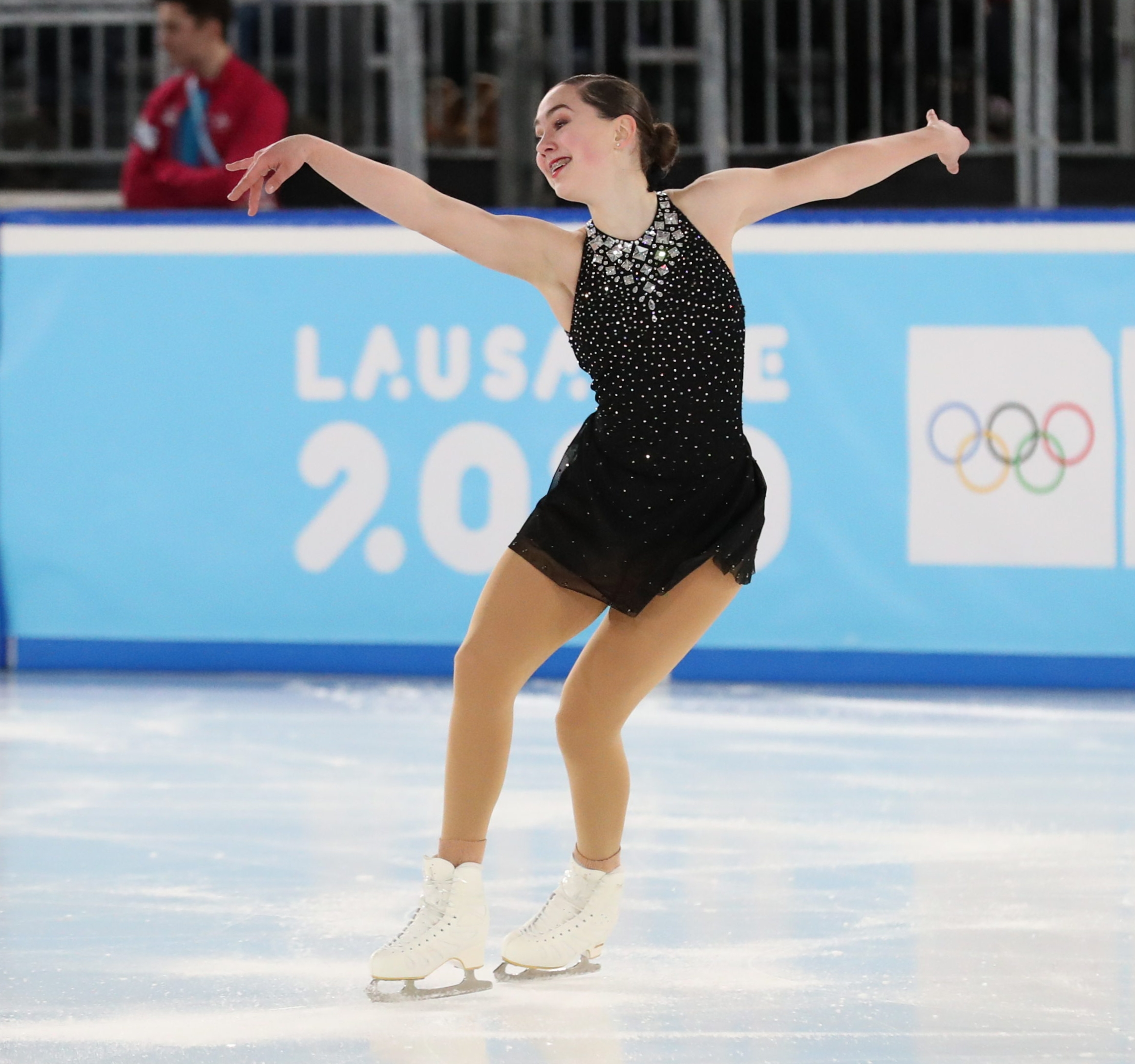
(Canada) Catherine Carle

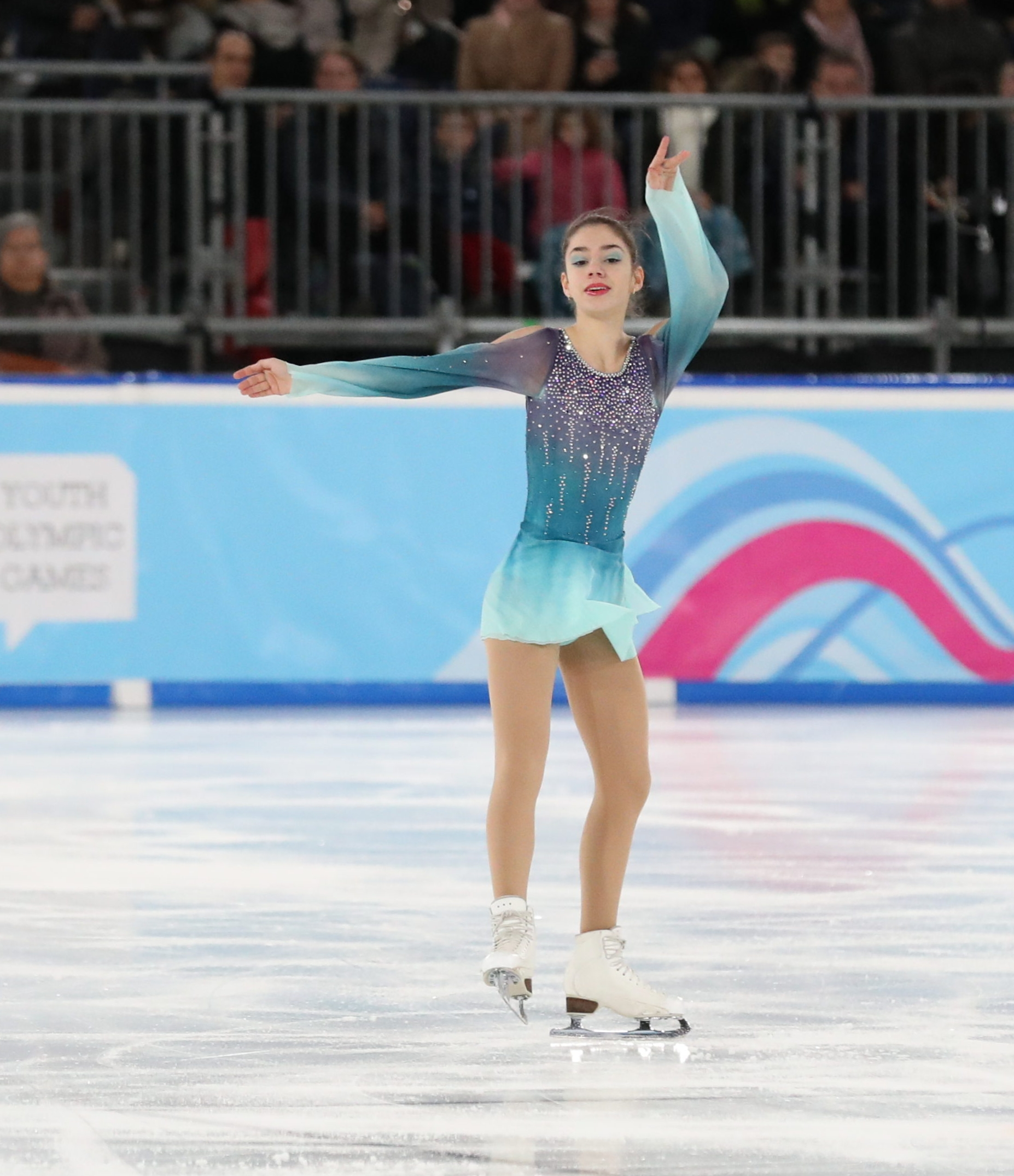
(Hungary) Regina Schermann

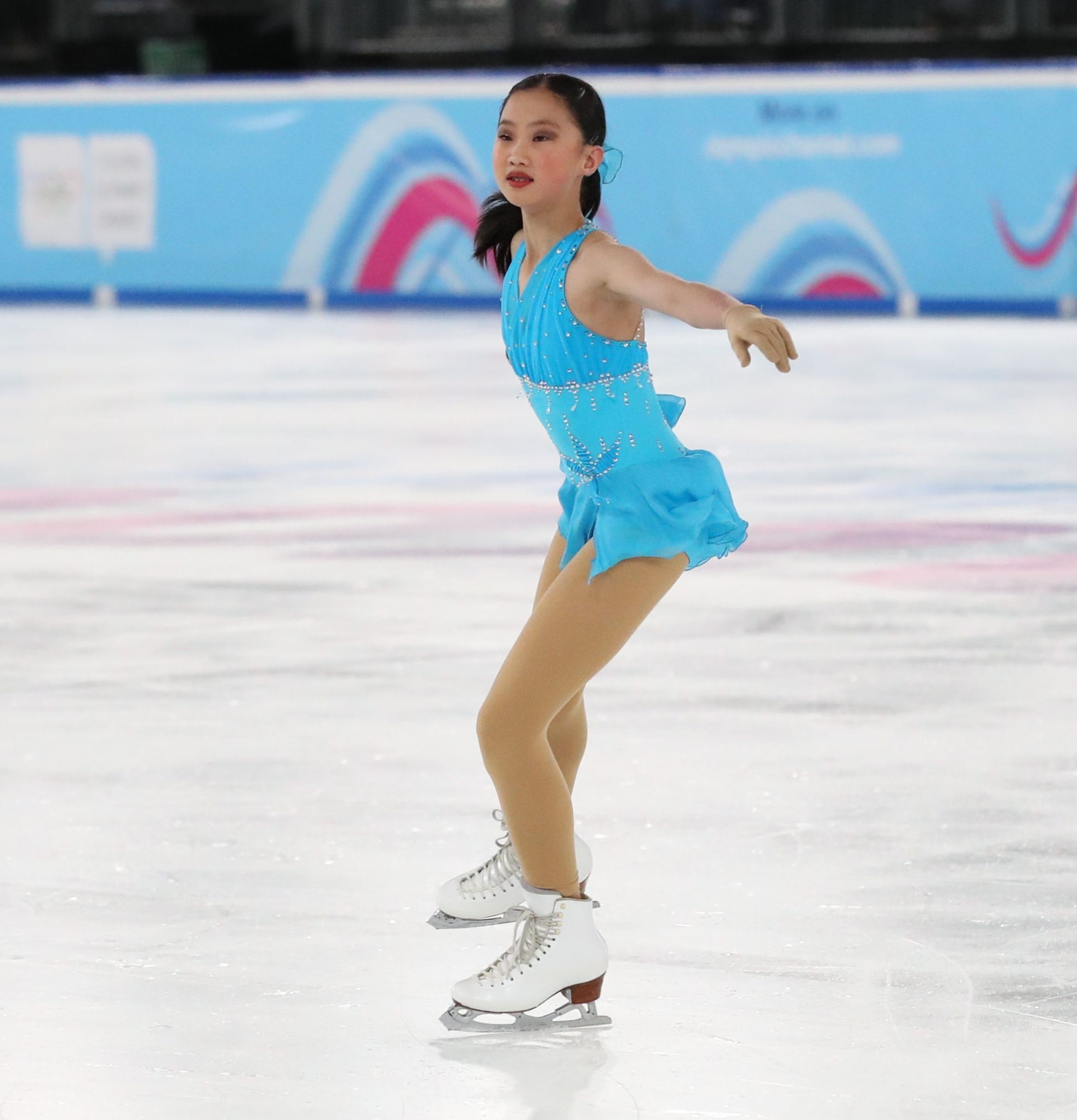
(United States) Kate Wang

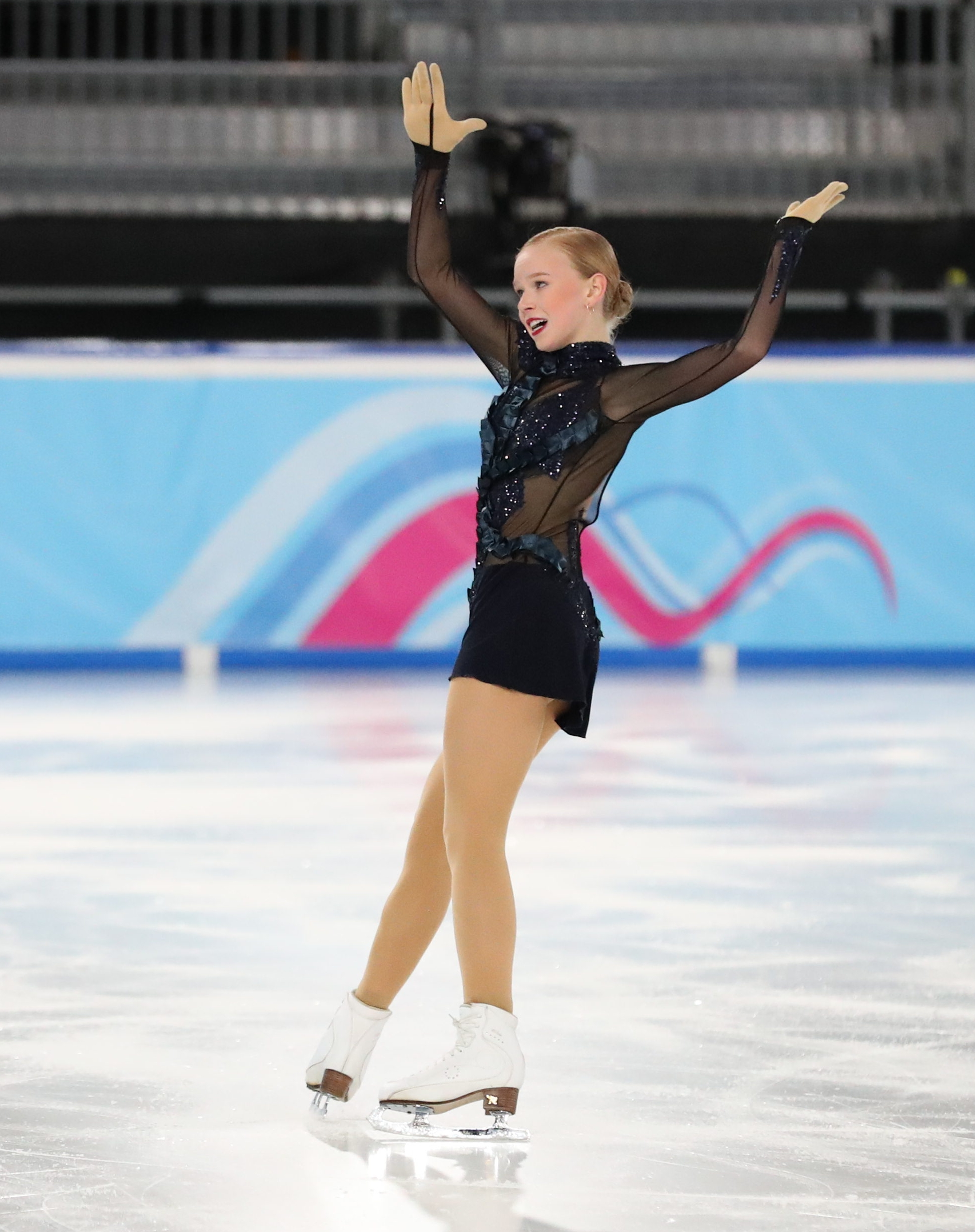
(Estonia) Eva-Lotta Kiibus

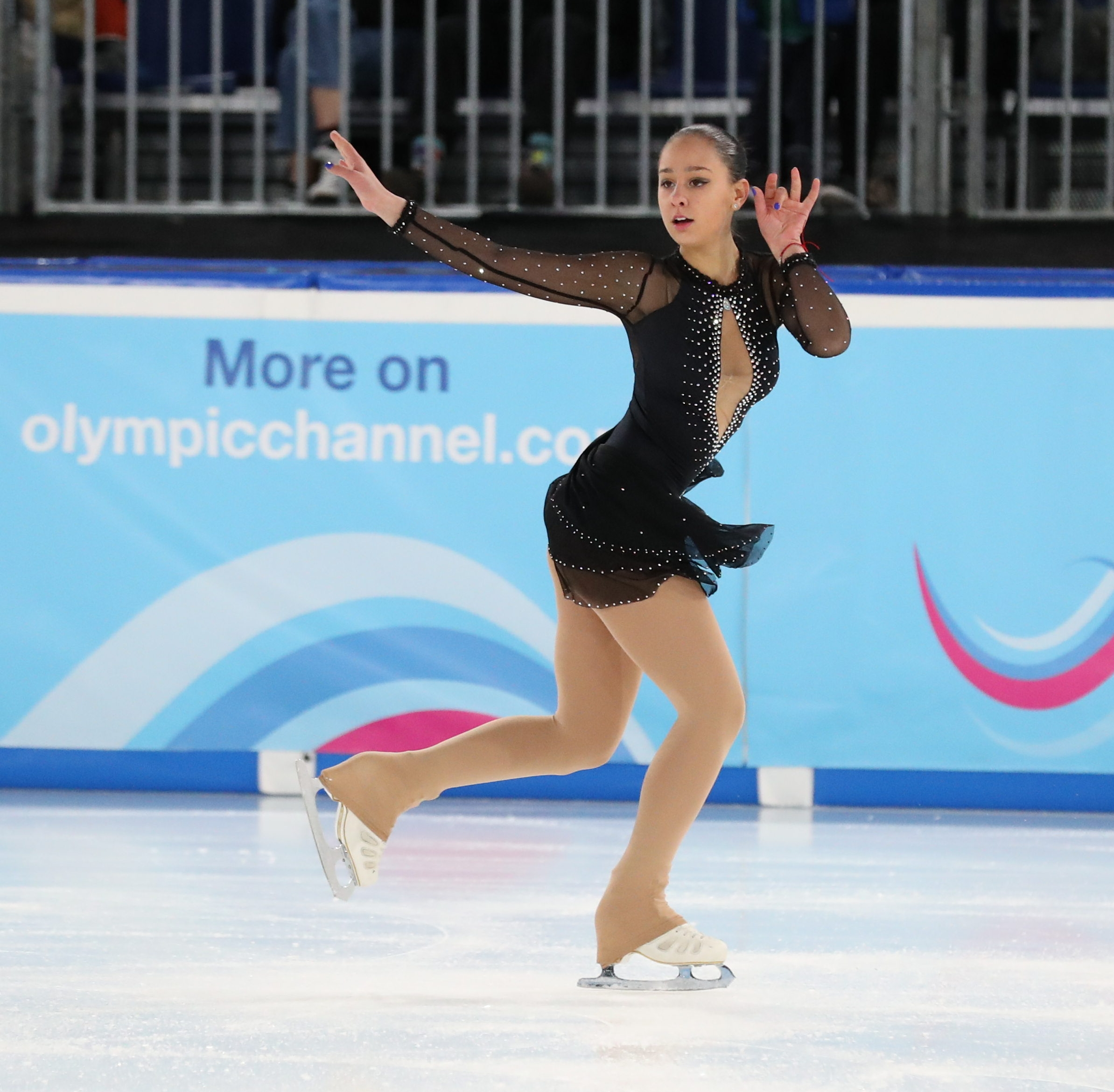
(Bulgaria) Ivelina Baycheva

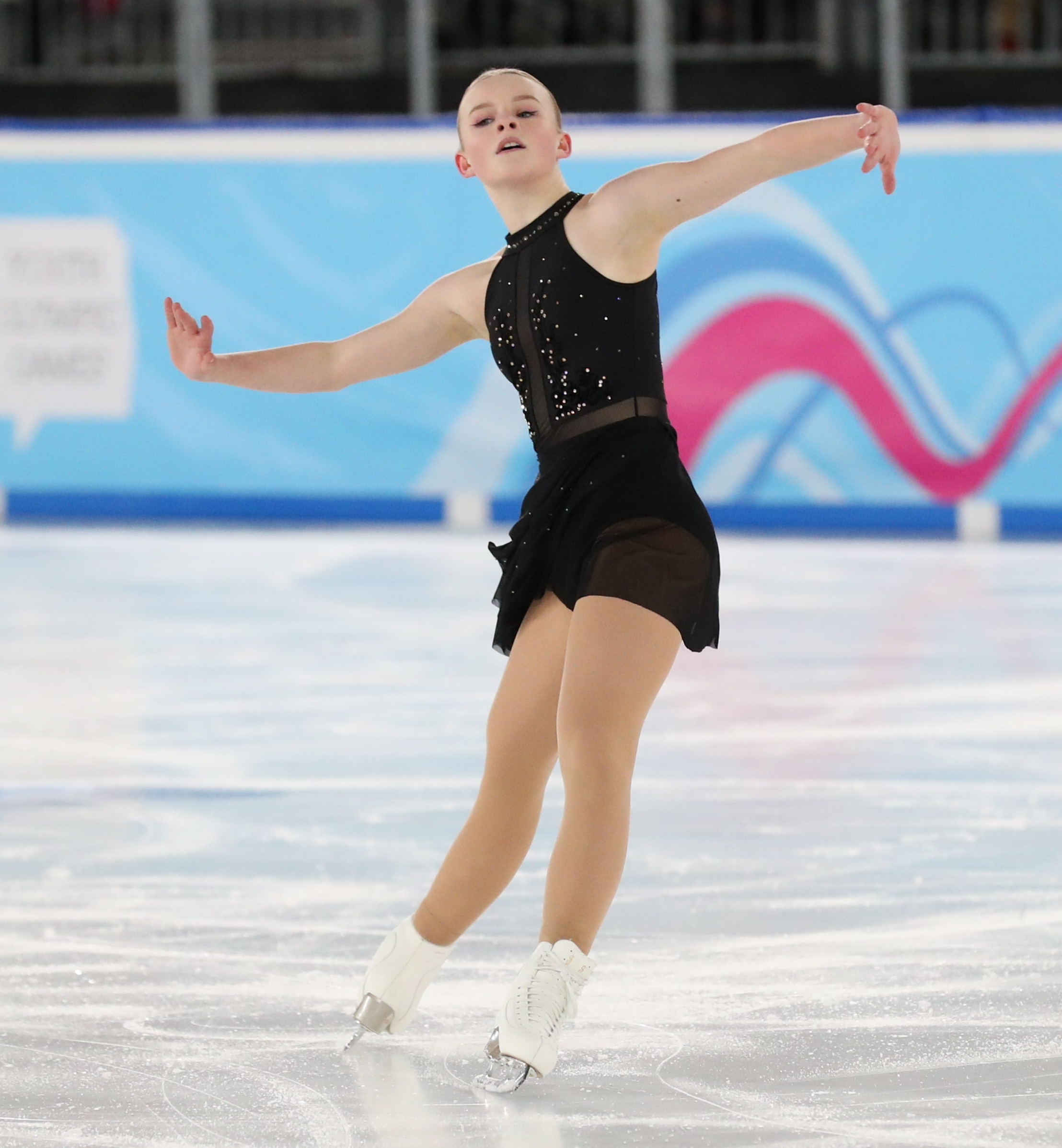
(Finland) Nella Pelkonen
