= Must the Devil Have All the Good Tunes? =

Piano concerto by John Adams

- by John Adams
- Period: Contemporary
- Composed: 2018
- Duration: c. 28 minutes
- Scoring: Orchestra

Premiere
- Date: March 7, 2019
- Location: Walt Disney Concert Hall, Los Angeles
- Conductor: Gustavo Dudamel
- Performers: Los Angeles Philharmonic, Yuja Wang

Must the Devil Have All the Good Tunes? is a piano concerto by the American composer John Adams. Its title is taken from a saying attributed to Martin Luther. The work was premiered on March 7, 2019, by Yuja Wang and the Los Angeles Philharmonic, conducted by Gustavo Dudamel. A recording, made by Wang, Dudamel, and the Los Angeles Philharmonic in November 2019, was released digitally by Deutsche Grammophon on April 17, 2020. The piece is Adams' third piano concerto, after Eros Piano (1989) and Century Rolls (1997).

== Composition ==
The piece is in three movements, played without pauses between them:

1. Gritty, funky, but in Strict Tempo; Twitchy, Bot-like
2. Much Slower; Gently, Relaxed
3. Più Mosso: Obsession / Swing

All three movements in total last about 28 minutes.

The piece is scored for the following orchestra:

Woodwinds

piccolo
2 flutes (1st doubling piccolo 2)
2 oboes
English horn
2 clarinets in B♭ and A (2nd doubling basset horn)
bass clarinet
2 bassoons
contrabassoon (doubling bassoon 3)

Brass

4 horns in F
2 trumpets in C
2 trombones (2nd doubling bass trombone)

Percussion (1 player)

almglocken
bass drum
snare drum

Keyboards

solo piano
honky-tonk piano

Strings

bass guitar

violin I
violin II
violas
cellos
double basses
