= Before the Fall =

Before the Fall can refer to:

- Before the Fall (2004 film), a German film
- Before the Fall (2008 film), a Spanish thriller film
- Before the Fall (2015 film), a Cambodian film
- Attack on Titan: Before the Fall, a light novel and manga
