= Víkingur Ólafsson =

Icelandic pianist (born 1984)

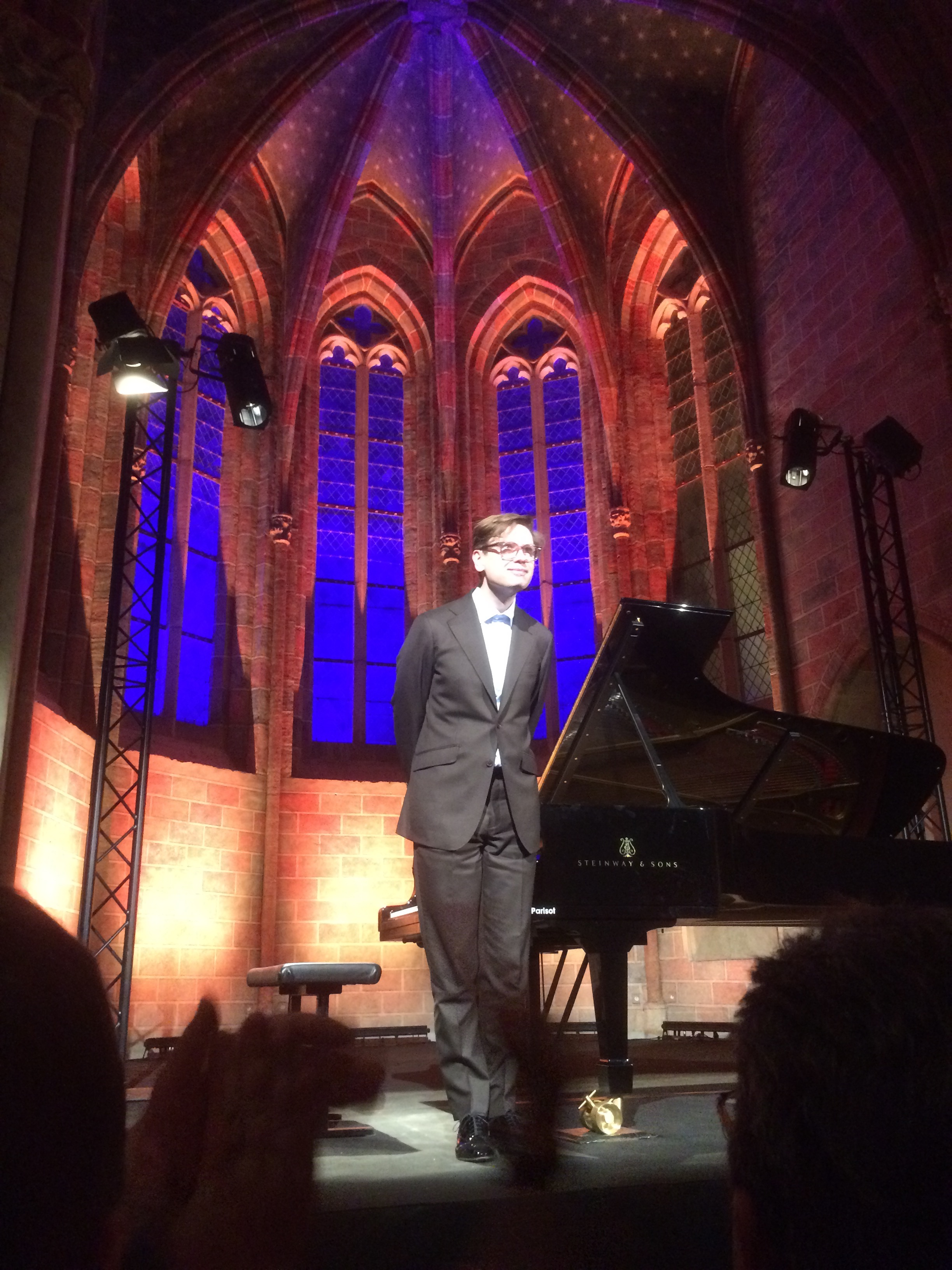
- Víkingur in 2023

Background information
- Born: 14 February 1984 (age 42); Reykjavík, Iceland
- Occupation: Classical pianist
- Instrument: Piano
- Years active: 2009–present
- Label: Deutsche Grammophon
- Website: vikingurolafsson.com

Víkingur Ólafsson (born 14 February 1984) is an Icelandic pianist. He has performed with leading orchestras in Europe and America, including the Los Angeles Philharmonic, Philharmonia Orchestra, New York Philharmonic, Berlin Philharmonic, Royal Concertgebouw Orchestra, London Philharmonic Orchestra, Cleveland Orchestra, Tonhalle Orchestra, Czech Philharmonic, and Santa Cecilia, and with such conductors as Thomas Adès, Esa-Pekka Salonen, and Santtu-Matias Rouvali.

Víkingur has won numerous awards, including Album of the Year at the 2019 BBC Music Magazine Awards for Johann Sebastian Bach, the Opus Klassik Award for Solo Instrumental in 2019 and 2020, Gramophone magazine's Artist of the Year award in 2019, the Rolf Schock Prize in Music in 2022, the 2022 Icelandic Export Award, Musical America's Instrumentalist of the Year award in 2025, the 2025 Order of the Falcon, the 2025 GRAMMY Award for Best Classical Instrumental Solo for J.S. Bach's Goldberg Variations, the 2025 Royal Philharmonic Society Gold Medal, and the 2025 Nordic Council Music Prize.

His 2017 album, Philip Glass Piano Works, saw him described as "Iceland's Glenn Gould" by The New York Times and a "breathtakingly brilliant pianist" by Gramophone; Le Monde heralded his "volcanic temperament, great virtuosity, taste for challenges".

== Early life and education ==
Víkingur grew up in Reykjavík and started playing the piano at an early age under the tutelage of his mother, Svana Víkingsdóttir, a piano teacher. He later studied with Erla Stefánsdóttir and Peter Máté before attending the Juilliard School in New York, earning bachelor's and master's degrees under the supervision of Jerome Lowenthal and Robert McDonald. He also took lessons with Ann Schein.

== Career ==
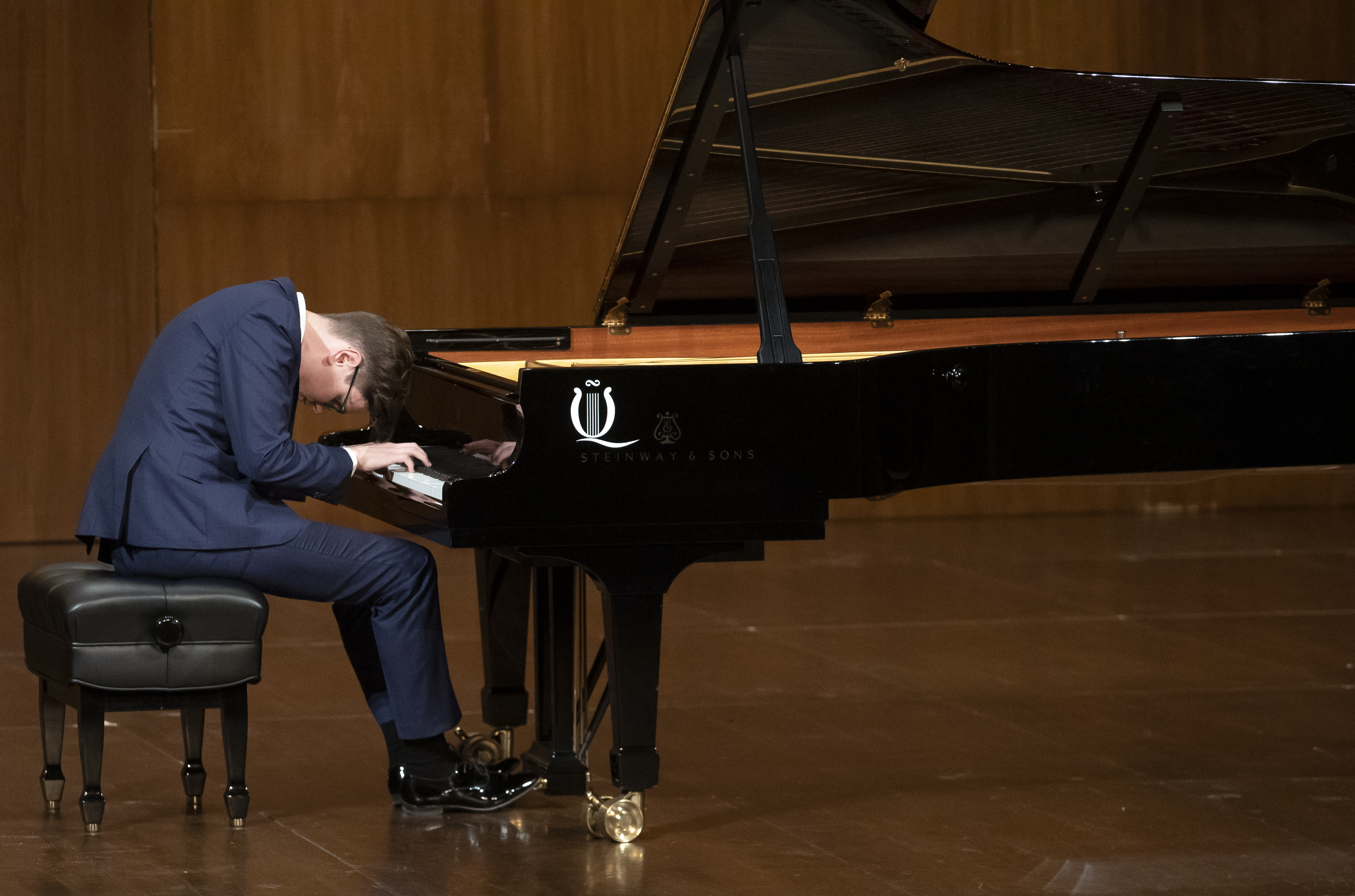
Víkingur Ólafsson in 2022

Víkingur has performed with leading orchestras around the world, including the Los Angeles Philharmonic, Philharmonia Orchestra, New York Philharmonic, Berlin Philharmonic, Royal Concertgebouw Orchestra, London Philharmonic Orchestra, Cleveland Orchestra, Tonhalle Orchestra, Czech Philharmonic, and Santa Cecilia Orchestra.

In 2011, he was the soloist in the opening concert for Harpa in Reykjavík, playing Edvard Grieg's piano concerto with the Iceland Symphony Orchestra under the baton of Vladimir Ashkenazy.

In 2016, he signed a recording contract with Deutsche Grammophon, part of Universal.

In the 2019–20 season, Víkingur gave the French première of John Adams's Must the Devil Have All the Good Tunes? with the Orchestre Philharmonique de Radio France and performed it with the Netherlands Radio Philharmonic Orchestra, both with Adams conducting.

In the same season, Víkingur was artist-in-residence at the Konzerthaus Berlin, with fourteen performances over eleven different projects, playing concertos by Thomas Adès, Robert Schumann, Daníel Bjarnason, and Mozart, two solo recitals, and chamber programmes with Martin Fröst and Florian Boesch.

Víkingur has premiered six piano concertos by Icelandic composers—including Snorri Sigfús Birgisson, Daníel Bjarnason, Haukur Tómasson, and Þórður Magnússon—as well as solo and chamber works by Atli Ingólfsson, Mark Simpson, and Mark-Anthony Turnage. He has taken part in collaborative performances with Philip Glass (in Reykjavík, Gothenburg, and London) and Björk, the latter on the television programme Átta raddir, produced by Jónas Sen for RÚV, the Icelandic National Broadcasting Service.

Víkingur is artist-in-residence at London's Southbank Centre and opened the classical season in September 2022 with Philharmonia Orchestra and Santtu-Matias Rouvali.

In 2023, Víkingur began a world tour to play one single work, Bach's Goldberg Variations, 88 times. His recording of the performance was released by Deutsche Grammophon on 6 October 2023.

=== Recordings ===
Víkingur has released three albums on his own record label, Dirrindí:

- 2009 – Debut, featuring Brahms's 7 Fantasies Op. 116 and 16 Waltzes as well as Beethoven's Eroica Variations.
- 2011 – Chopin-Bach, featuring Chopin's preludes and two of Bach's partitas.
- 2012 – Winterreise, featuring Schubert's Winterreise with Icelandic operatic bass singer Kristinn Sigmundsson (CD and DVD), which won Classical Album of the Year at the 2012 Icelandic Music Awards

In 2016, Víkingur signed an exclusive recording contract with Deutsche Grammophon.

- 2017 – Philip Glass Piano Works, featuring Philip Glass's Études, "Opening" from Glassworks, and a rework of Glassworks by Christian Badzura
- 2018 – Johann Sebastian Bach, featuring Bach's works for keyboard solo. The album won multiple awards, including BBC Music Magazine's Album of the Year
- 2020 – Debussy • Rameau
- 2021 – Reflections featuring Hania Rani, Balmorhea, and Hugar and Helgi Jonsson
- 2021 – Mozart & Contemporaries
- 2022 – From Afar
- 2023 – J.S. Bach: Goldberg Variations
- 2025 – Opus 109, featuring music by Bach, Beethoven, and Schubert

Víkingur also recorded the soundtrack of Darkest Hour, a film directed by Joe Wright, and released Bach Reworks, featuring six remixed works by J. S. Bach from the likes of Ben Frost, Peter Gregson, Valgeir Sigurðsson, and Víkingur himself.

=== Awards ===
- 2019 – Gramophone magazine: Artist of the Year
- 2019 – BBC Music Magazine Recording of the Year for Johann Sebastian Bach
- 2019 – BBC Music Magazine Instrumental Album of the Year for Johann Sebastian Bach
- 2019 – Opus Klassik Piano Recital Album of the Year for Johann Sebastian Bach
- 2019 – Limelight magazine International Artist of the Year
- 2020 – Opus Klassik Solo for Debussy Rameau
- 2022 – Rolf Schock Prize in the Music category
- 2022 – Icelandic Export Award
- 2022 – Icelandic Order of the Falcon
- 2023 – CoScan Nordic Person of the Year
- 2025 – Grammy Award for Best Classical Instrumental Solo for J.S. Bach: Goldberg Variations
- 2025 – Musical America: Instrumentalist of the Year
- 2025 – Royal Philharmonic Society Gold Medal
- 2025 – Nordic Council Music Prize

=== Broadcasting ===
Víkingur has hosted two television series about Western classical music that were broadcast on RÚV, they were well received by critics. He has also written and hosted radio programmes for Rás 1, BBC Radio 3, and BBC Radio 4's Front Row.

=== Festivals ===
In 2012, Víkingur founded Reykjavík Midsummer Music, an annual chamber music festival held in Harpa, Reykjavík. The festival won Musical Event of the Year at the 2012 Icelandic Music Awards, along with a special prize for innovation. In 2015, the pianist succeeded Martin Fröst as the artistic director of Sweden's Vinterfest.

At the 2014 Transart Festival in Bolzano, Italy, Víkingur collaborated with Swiss artist Roman Signer in an event titled Vers la Flamme – Ein Konzert mit Störung. Víkingur performed Alexander Scriabin's Vers la flamme on a floating stage on Lake Vernago with a helicopter hovering over him.

== Personal life ==
Víkingur has both absolute pitch and synesthesia, whereby he associates keys with colors. For example, he reportedly associates F minor with blue, A major with yellow, and B major with purple.
