= Century Rolls =

Piano concerto by John Adams

Century Rolls is a piano concerto by the American composer John Adams. Commissioned by Emanuel Ax, the work dates from 1997. Ax was the soloist in the concerto's premiere on September 25, 1997 in Cleveland, Ohio, with Christoph von Dohnányi conducting The Cleveland Orchestra. Ax, von Dohnányi and The Cleveland Orchestra made the first commercial recording of the concerto, for Nonesuch. Adams himself conducted the UK premiere on 1 November 1998, again with Ax as the piano soloist. Century Rolls was additionally featured during the 2008 ISCM World Music Days in Vilnius, Lithuania in a performance by pianist Petras Geniušas with the Lithuanian National Symphony Orchestra conducted by Juozas Domarkas in the National Philharmonic Hall on 25 October 25 2008.

Adams conceived the work after hearing the distinct sounds of a 1920s player-piano, and the work was "in part an attempt to recreate that initial response I had received to the sound of the piano as heard via the medium of the piano roll." He has said that the concerto is his view on "the whole past century of piano music". In addition to the temporal element ("Century"), the title refers to old piano rolls.

== Instrumentation ==
Solo piano, 2 flutes, piccolo, 2 oboes, cor anglais, 2 clarinets, bass clarinet, 2 bassoons, three horns, three trumpets, 2 trombones, timpani, percussion (2 players: vibraphone, xylophone, wood block, marimba, high bongo, glockenspiel), harp, celesta, and strings.

== Movements ==
The concerto is in three movements. The opening movement is nearly half the length of the entire piece followed by two shorter contrasting movements.

The first movement opens with a simple motif from the harp, piccolo, and flute over top of the pounding of the piano. As the piece evolves the strings, brass, and percussion accompany the softer sounds of the harp, piccolo, and flute, making the piece much more dynamic. The other instruments rotate in and out, but the sound of the piano is consistent and hammering. This contrasting sound represents, as Adams believes, the dichotomy between ‘extravagant and unserious’. The light beginning filled with the softer sounds are fanciful and represent this ‘unserious’ aspect. However, as the movement continues and builds the harder, more ‘extravagant’ sounds take over the piece. Adams mixes elements of Gershwin, Rachmaninov, Paderewski, and Jelly Roll Morton to create a modern piano roll sound.

The second movement, titled "Manny’s Gym", is much slower than the first. The piano sound softens itself and the strings accompany with the same sensual sound. The sound of both the piano and the strings contrast greatly with the first movement. It is much more drawn out. It starts to build, but never reaches a climax. The sounds smooths down to a dreamlike trance. The title refers to the Gymnopedies of Erik Satie and to Emanuel Ax's nickname, "Manny".

The title of the third movement, "Hail, Bop" is a pun on the Hale-Bopp comet, which appeared over America while Adams was writing the piece. The pounding sounds resonate throughout this movement, echoing the first movement and its ‘extravagant’ sound. Robert Stein writes that the ‘finale (Hail Bop) takes us back to the bump’n’boogie world of the first movement with its jabby syncopations and high speed scales and arpeggios.’
