= Lithuania at the 2020 Winter Youth Olympics =

- IOC code: LTU
- NOC: Lithuanian National Olympic Committee
- Website: www.ltok.lt

in Lausanne
- Competitors: 15 in 5 sports
- Flag bearer: Smiltė Bieliūnaitė
- Medals: Gold 0 Silver 0 Bronze 0 Total 0

Winter Youth Olympics appearances (overview)
- 2012; 2016; 2020; 2024

Lithuania competed at the 2020 Winter Youth Olympics in Lausanne, Switzerland from 9 to 22 January 2020.

== Medalists ==
Medals awarded to participants of mixed-NOC teams are represented in italics. These medals are not counted towards the individual NOC medal tally.

Medal	Name	Sport	Event	Date
Bronze	Artur Seniut	Ice hockey	Boys' 3x3 mixed tournament	15 February

== Alpine skiing ==
Boys

Athlete	Event	Run 1		Run 2		Total	
Athlete	Event	Time	Rank	Time	Rank	Time	Rank
Vakaris Jokūbas Lapienis	Giant slalom	1:16.31	53	1:17.97	49	2:34.28	50
Vakaris Jokūbas Lapienis	Slalom	47.40	46	48.00	34	1:35.40	34

Girls

Athlete	Event	Run 1		Run 2		Total	
Athlete	Event	Time	Rank	Time	Rank	Time	Rank
Smiltė Bieliūnaitė	Giant slalom	1:18.02	46	1:17.37	32	2:35.39	32
Smiltė Bieliūnaitė	Slalom	DNF					

== Biathlon ==
Boys

Athlete	Event	Time	Misses	Rank
Darius Dinda	Sprint	23:37.6	5 (1+4)	72
Darius Dinda	Individual	44:05.8	11 (4+3+3+1)	84
Domas Jankauskas	Sprint	24:21.5	5 (2+3)	80
Domas Jankauskas	Individual	42:59.4	7 (2+2+1+2)	77
Lukas Žukauskas	Sprint	27:49.3 *^{1}	7 (2+5)	95
Lukas Žukauskas	Individual	51:18.8	15 (4+5+3+3)	96

Girls

Athlete	Event	Time	Misses	Rank
Viktorija Augulytė	Sprint	23:27.4	1 (0+1)	76
Viktorija Augulytė	Individual	43:46.9	7 (3+2+1+1)	79
Kamilė Jakubauskaitė	Sprint	27:14.4	5 (4+1)	91
Kamilė Jakubauskaitė	Individual	43:30.2	5 (1+2+0+2)	76
Luka Mackevičiūtė	Sprint	DNS		
Luka Mackevičiūtė	Individual	DNF		

Mixed

Athletes	Event	Time	Misses	Rank
Viktorija Augulytė; Darius Dinda	Single mixed relay	49:04.1	1+10	23
Viktorija Augulytė; Kamilė Jakubauskaitė; Darius Dinda; Domas Jankauskas	Mixed relay	DSQ *^{2}		

- ^{1} Time adjustment 2:00.0, because penalty lap not run after shooting (IBU ECR (Event and Competition Rules) 11.3.3.a.)).
- ^{2} Disqualified, because fired more rounds than allowed (IBU ECR (Event and Competition Rules) 11.3.4.o.)).

== Cross-country skiing ==
Boys

Athlete	Event	Qualification		Quarterfinal		Semifinal		Final	
Athlete	Event	Time	Rank	Time	Rank	Time	Rank	Time	Rank
Edvinas Simonutis	10 km classic	—N/a						31:40.4	57
Edvinas Simonutis	Sprint freestyle	3:40.28	56	Did not advance					
Edvinas Simonutis	Cross-country cross	5:03.11	64	Did not advance					
Irmantas Žilinskas	10 km classic	—N/a						34:10.5	70
Irmantas Žilinskas	Sprint freestyle	4:29.93	81	Did not advance					
Irmantas Žilinskas	Cross-country cross	5:30.43	77	Did not advance					

Girls

Athlete	Event	Qualification		Quarterfinal		Semifinal		Final	
Athlete	Event	Time	Rank	Time	Rank	Time	Rank	Time	Rank
Eglė Savickaitė	5 km classic	—N/a						18:18.3	65
Eglė Savickaitė	Sprint freestyle	3:23.80	63	Did not advance					
Eglė Savickaitė	Cross-country cross	5:26.21	68	Did not advance					

== Ice hockey ==
=== 3x3 ===
Team	Event	Group stage								Semifinal	Final / BM	
Team	Event	Opposition Score	Opposition Score	Opposition Score	Opposition Score	Opposition Score	Opposition Score	Opposition Score	Rank	Opposition Score	Opposition Score	Rank
Team Black; Ruben Esposito (ARG); Lukas Floriantschitz (AUT); Kerem Alsan (TUR); Yaroslav Labutkin (RUS); Yu Jiacong (CHN); Corné van Stuijvenberg (NED); Wataru Suzuki (JPN); Adam Sýkora (SVK); Dominik Pavlata (CZE); Linas Dėdinas (LTU); Danil Karpovich (BLR); Kalle Varis (FIN); Matthias Rindone (ITA)	Boys' 3x3	Team Brown; L 11–13 (5–6, 2–3, 4–4)	Team Red; L 9–12 (3–4, 4–3, 2–5)	Team Blue; W 14–8 (7–4, 5–2, 2–2)	Team Yellow; W 19–7 (7–2, 6–2, 6–3)	Team Orange; L 8–14 (4–3, 3–4, 1–7)	Team Grey; W 16–8 (2–4, 10–1, 4–3)	Team Green; W 6–4 (2–2, 2–1, 2–1)	4	Team Green; L 3–7 (2–0, 0–2, 1–5)	Team Brown; L 5–6 (2–1, 1–3, 2–2)	4
Team Blue; Caleb Chapman (NZL); Chen Chih-yuan (TPE); Jakub Trzebunia (POL); Ziya Efe Güçlü (TUR); Hong Seung-woo (KOR); Daniel Assavolyuk (GER); Joris Valčiukas (LTU); Riley Langille (AUS); Cater Hamill (GBR); Konrad Kudeviita (EST); Simone Terraneo (SUI); Oliver Thestrup Hansen (DEN); Issa Otsuka (JPN)	Boys' 3x3	Team Grey; L 8–9 (1–2, 3–5, 4–2)	Team Orange; L 1–12 (1–5 0–2 0–5)	Team Black; L 8–14 (4–7, 2–5, 2–2)	Team Green; L 6–11 (1–2, 3–2, 2–7)	Team Yellow; L 8–13 (2–3, 2–4, 4–6)	Team Brown; L 2–14 (0–5, 1–3, 1–6)	Team Red; L 11–18 (2–11, 3–3, 6–4)	8	did not advance		
Team Brown; Axel Ruski-Jones (NZL); Luka Banek (CRO); Sai Lake (AUS); Hugo Galvez (FRA); Elvis Hsu (HKG); Marlon D'Acunto (GER); Erik Potšinok (EST); Evan Nauth (GBR); Artur Seniut (LTU); Matyáš Šapovaliv (CZE); Milán Ivády (HUN); Rastislav Eliáš (SVK); Sebastian Aarsund (NOR)	Boys' 3x3	Team Black; W 13–11 (6–5, 3–2, 4–4)	Team Green; L 6–8 (1–2 3–2 2–4)	Team Grey; W 16–6 (4–3, 4–2, 8–1)	Team Orange; W 14–10 (6–0, 5–4, 3–6)	Team Red; L 5–11 (2–3, 1–4, 2–4)	Team Blue; W 14–2 (5–0, 3–1, 6–1)	Team Yellow; W 8–6 (2–1, 2–0, 4–5)	2	Team Red; L 7–9 (4–4, 2–3, 1–2)	Team Black; W 6–5 (1–2, 3–1, 2–2)	3rd place, bronze medalist(s)

== Snowboarding ==
Halfpipe, Slopestyle, & Big Air

Athlete	Event	Qualification				Final				
Athlete	Event	Run 1	Run 2	Best	Rank	Run 1	Run 2	Run 3	Best	Rank
Motiejus Morauskas	Boys' big air	11.50	13.00	13.00	19	Did not advance				
Motiejus Morauskas	Boys' slopestyle	15.66	23.00	23.00	17	Did not advance				

== See also ==
- Lithuania at the 2020 Summer Olympics
