= Skeleton at the 2020 Winter Youth Olympics =

Skeleton at the III Winter Youth Olympic Games
- Venue: St. Moritz-Celerina Olympic Bobrun
- Dates: 19–20 January
- Competitors: 40 from 19 nations

Skeleton at the 2020 Winter Youth Olympics took place at the St. Moritz-Celerina Olympic Bobrun from 19 to 20 January 2020.

== Medal summary ==
=== Medal table ===
* Host nation (Switzerland)

Rank	Nation	Gold	Silver	Bronze	Total
1	Germany	1	1	1	3
2	Russia	1	0	0	1
3	Latvia	0	1	0	1
4	Switzerland*	0	0	1	1
Totals (4 entries)		2	2	2	6

=== Medalists ===
==== Events ====
Event	Gold		Silver		Bronze	
Boys'	Lukas Nydegger; Germany	2:17.00	Elvis Veinbergs; Latvia	2:18.42	Livio Summermatter; Switzerland	2:19.53
Girls'	Anastasiia Tsyganova; Russia	2:22.50	Josefa Schellmoser; Germany	2:22.53	Sissi Schrödl; Germany	2:22.95

== Qualification ==
A total of 40 athletes will qualify to compete (20 per gender). A NOC can enter a maximum of three athletes per gender. Quotas were officially awarded via the IBSF Youth World Ranking List as of 9 December 2019.

=== Summary ===
NOC	Boys	Girls	Total
Austria	1	2	3
Belgium	1	1	2
Brazil	1	1	2
Canada	1	1	2
China		1	1
Czech Republic	1		1
Denmark	1		1
Germany	2	3	5
Japan	2		2
Latvia	1	1	2
Liechtenstein		1	1
Poland		1	1
Russia	2	2	4
South Korea	1		1
Sweden	1	2	3
Switzerland	2	2	4
Chinese Taipei	1	1	2
Ukraine		1	1
United States	2		2
Total: 19 NOCs	20	20	40
