= Cross-country skiing at the 2020 Winter Youth Olympics – Boys' 10 kilometre classical =

Boys' 10 kilometer classical at the III Winter Youth Olympic Games
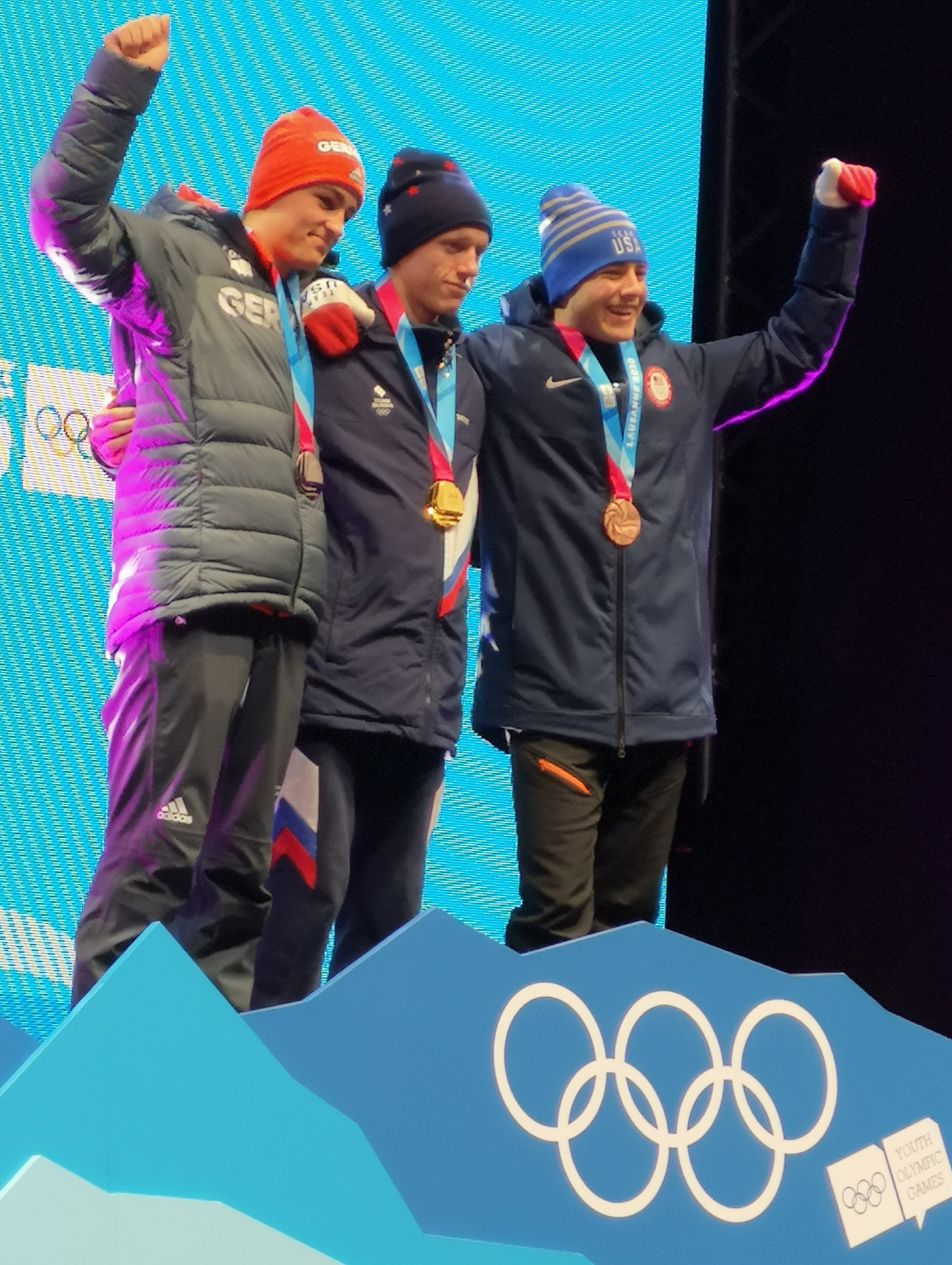
- Venue: Vallée de Joux Cross-Country Centre
- Date: 21 January
- Competitors: 85 from 49 nations

Medalists
1st place, gold medalist(s)		Iliya Tregubov	Russia
2nd place, silver medalist(s)		Elias Keck	Germany
3rd place, bronze medalist(s)		Will Koch	United States

The boys' 10 kilometer classical cross-country skiing competition at the 2020 Winter Youth Olympics was held on 21 January at the Vallée de Joux Cross-Country Center.

== Results ==
The race was started at 13:00.

Rank	Bib	Athlete	Country	Time	Deficit
1st place, gold medalist(s)	76	Iliya Tregubov	Russia	26:40.5	
2nd place, silver medalist(s)	56	Elias Keck	Germany	27:25.5	+45.0
3rd place, bronze medalist(s)	83	Will Koch	United States	27:29.5	+49.0
4	85	Alexander Ståhlberg	Finland	27:32.5	+52.0
5	69	Nikolai Holmboe	Norway	27:35.6	+55.1
6	68	Aleksander Holmboe	Norway	27:38.5	+58.0
7	84	Edvin Anger	Sweden	27:39.1	+58.6
8	51	Alexey Loktinov	Russia	27:47.3	+1:06.8
9	6	Luc Primet	France	27:53.7	+1:13.2
10	18	Mattéo Correia	France	28:02.5	+1:22.0
11	22	Simon Chappaz	France	28:05.4	+1:24.9
12	74	Robert Bugara	Poland	28:06.4	+1:25.9
13	55	Brian Bushey	United States	28:12.6	+1:32.1
14	72	Matias Hyvönen	Finland	28:15.7	+1:35.2
15	65	Mathias Vacek	Czech Republic	28:16.3	+1:35.8
16	49	Simon Jung	Germany	28:19.1	+1:38.6
17	62	Šimon Pavlásek	Czech Republic	28:26.5	+1:46.0
18	77	Derek Deuling	Canada	28:30.6	+1:50.1
19	67	Antonin Savary	Switzerland	28:34.1	+1:53.6
20	73	Nikita Pisarev	Russia	28:34.3	+1:53.8
21	82	Lee Jin-bok	South Korea	28:38.2	+1:57.7
22	66	Marius Kastner	Germany	28:43.8	+2:03.3
23	45	Elia Barp	Italy	28:51.9	+2:11.4
24	80	Didar Kassenov	Kazakhstan	28:53.1	+2:12.6
25	70	Jošt Mulej	Slovenia	28:53.6	+2:13.1
26	81	Albin Åström	Sweden	28:55.1	+2:14.6
27	35	Anže Gros	Slovenia	28:58.1	+2:17.6
28	16	Kaspar Päärson	Estonia	29:00.4	+2:19.9
29	64	Stian Groenli	Norway	29:02.0	+2:21.5
30	79	Andrea Gartner	Italy	29:08.9	+2:28.4
31	24	Zhang Chenghao	China	29:15.5	+2:35.0
32	30	Campbell Wright	New Zealand	29:17.0	+2:36.5
33	36	Anders Veerpalu	Estonia	29:23.6	+2:43.1
34	57	Piotr Sobiczewski	Poland	29:31.1	+2:50.6
35	42	Simone Mastrobattista	Italy	29:34.9	+2:54.4
36	53	Volodymyr Aksiuta	Ukraine	30:00.2	+3:19.7
37	37	Ilyas Issabek	Kazakhstan	30:01.0	+3:20.5
38	28	Otgonlkhagvyn Zolbayar	Mongolia	30:03.7	+3:23.2
39	40	Denis Tilesch	Slovakia	30:13.8	+3:33.3
40	59	Jeon Sung-min	South Korea	30:15.4	+3:34.9
41	75	Oleksandr Lisohor	Ukraine	30:18.0	+3:37.5
42	48	Miquel Auladell	Spain	30:18.1	+3:37.6
43	78	David Knobel	Switzerland	30:20.2	+3:39.7
44	26	Kryštof Zatloukal	Czech Republic	30:21.5	+3:41.0
45	31	Hjalmar Michelsen	Denmark	30:23.3	+3:42.8
46	71	Aleksandar Ognyanov	Bulgaria	30:24.7	+3:44.2
47	44	Sasha Masson	Canada	30:27.1	+3:46.6
48	8	Kai Mittelsteadt	United States	30:38.0	+3:57.5
49	38	Robin Frommelt	Liechtenstein	30:42.2	+4:01.7
50	12	Hugo Hinckfuss	Australia	30:49.3	+4:08.8
51	34	Erik Engel	Austria	30:49.5	+4:09.0
52	63	Sebastian Bryja	Poland	31:00.8	+4:20.3
53	19	Lauris Kaparkalējs	Latvia	31:02.8	+4:22.3
54	27	Mikhail Marozau	Belarus	31:13.1	+4:32.6
55	60	Manex Silva	Brazil	31:13.2	+4:32.7
56	29	Matúš Oravec	Slovakia	31:37.0	+4:56.5
57	43	Edvinas Šimonutis	Lithuania	31:40.4	+4:59.9
58	13	Christian Steiner	Austria	31:41.4	+5:00.9
59	41	Aleksandrs Artūrs Ļūļe	Latvia	31:44.3	+5:03.8
60	46	Hleb Shakel	Belarus	32:00.1	+5:19.6
61	11	Batsükhiin Khongor	Mongolia	32:06.6	+5:26.1
62	52	Rhaick Bomfim	Brazil	32:16.7	+5:36.2
63	50	Mehmet Türün	Turkey	32:26.3	+5:45.8
64	10	James Slimon	Great Britain	32:35.7	+5:55.2
65	33	Christoph Wieland	Austria	32:43.1	+6:02.6
66	47	Mateo Sauma	Argentina	32:48.7	+6:08.2
67	14	John Mordes	Australia	33:11.8	+6:31.3
68	9	Spartak Voskanyan	Armenia	33:26.5	+6:46.0
69	25	Aleksandar Grbović	Montenegro	33:31.6	+6:51.1
70	7	Irmantas Žilinskas	Lithuania	34:10.5	+7:30.0
71	4	Petar Perušić	Croatia	34:16.1	+7:35.6
72	23	Flaviu Păvălean	Romania	34:22.7	+7:42.2
73	3	Einar Árni Gíslason	Iceland	36:15.4	+9:34.9
74	20	Đorđe Santrač	Bosnia and Herzegovina	36:17.3	+9:36.8
75	21	Pedro Cotaro	Argentina	36:20.1	+9:39.6
76	15	Juan Uberuaga	Chile	40:10.9	+13:30.4
77	5	Amirhossein Bandali	Iran	40:32.2	+13:51.7
78	2	Islam Turganbaev	Kyrgyzstan	42:00.1	+15:19.6
79	1	Sarawut Koedsin	Thailand	47:37.9	+20:57.4
	17	Elie Tawk	Lebanon	Did not finish	
	32	Ramon Riebli	Switzerland	Did not finish	
	58	Liviu Hăngănuț	Romania	Did not finish	
	39	Spyridonas Papadopoulos	Greece	Did not start	
	54	Georgios Anastasiadis	Greece	Did not start	
	61	Veeti Pyykkö	Finland	Did not start	
