= Cross-country skiing at the 2020 Winter Youth Olympics – Boys' cross-country cross =

Boys' cross-country cross at the III Winter Youth Olympic Games
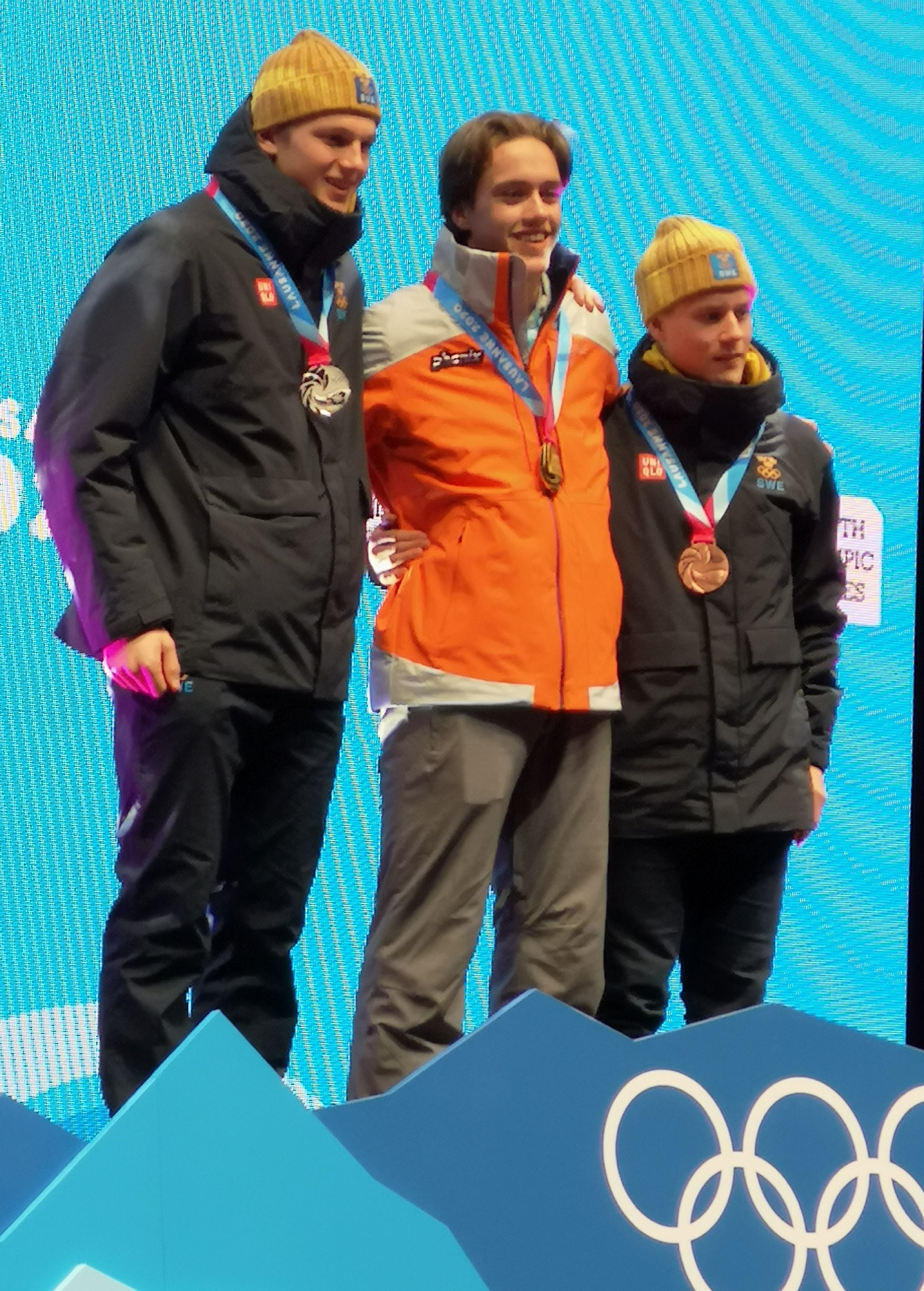
- Venue: Vallée de Joux Cross-Country Centre
- Date: 18 January
- Competitors: 86 from 46 nations

Medalists
1st place, gold medalist(s)		Nikolai Holmboe	Norway
2nd place, silver medalist(s)		Edvin Anger	Sweden
3rd place, bronze medalist(s)		Albin Åström	Sweden

The boys' cross-country cross freestyle cross-country skiing competition at the 2020 Winter Youth Olympics was held on 18 January at the Vallée de Joux Cross-Country Centre.

== Results ==
=== Qualifying ===
The qualifying was held at 11:50.

Rank	Bib	Athlete	Country	Time	Deficit	Note
1	20	Nikolai Holmboe	Norway	4:10.66		Q
2	26	Aleksander Holmboe	Norway	4:15.56	+4.90	Q
3	14	Will Koch	United States	4:17.33	+6.67	Q
4	19	Marius Kastner	Germany	4:18.77	+8.11	Q
5	18	Albin Åström	Sweden	4:19.74	+9.08	Q
6	2	Edvin Anger	Sweden	4:20.96	+10.30	Q
7	82	Elias Keck	Germany	4:23.00	+12.34	Q
8	9	Alexander Ståhlberg	Finland	4:23.30	+12.64	Q
9	5	Anže Gros	Slovenia	4:23.34	+12.68	Q
10	81	Iliya Tregubov	Russia	4:24.09	+13.43	Q
11	16	Nikita Pisarev	Russia	4:24.96	+14.30	Q
12	84	Simon Jung	Germany	4:25.12	+14.46	Q
13	24	Antonin Savary	Switzerland	4:26.59	+15.93	Q
14	7	Jošt Mulej	Slovenia	4:27.66	+17.00	Q
15	3	Ramon Riebli	Switzerland	4:28.00	+17.34	Q
16	37	David Knobel	Switzerland	4:29.27	+18.61	Q
17	44	Stian Groenli	Norway	4:29.55	+18.89	Q
18	74	Simone Mastrobattista	Italy	4:30.51	+19.85	Q
19	6	Oleksandr Lisohor	Ukraine	4:31.80	+21.14	Q
20	76	Elia Barp	Italy	4:32.06	+21.40	Q
21	32	Simon Chappaz	France	4:32.13	+21.47	Q
22	42	Mathias Vacek	Czech Republic	4:32.34	+21.68	Q
23	21	Luc Primet	France	4:33.35	+22.69	Q
24	11	Piotr Sobiczewski	Poland	4:34.07	+23.41	Q
25	34	Anders Veerpalu	Estonia	4:35.29	+24.63	Q
26	25	Campbell Wright	New Zealand	4:35.44	+24.78	Q
27	85	Hleb Shakel	Belarus	4:35.59	+24.93	Q
28	57	Brian Bushey	United States	4:35.68	+25.02	Q
29	58	Kaspar Päärson	Estonia	4:35.93	+25.27	Q
30	83	Alexey Loktinov	Russia	4:36.16	+25.50	Q
31	67	Andrea Gartner	Italy	4:36.59	+25.93	
32	36	Veeti Pyykkö	Finland	4:36.65	+25.99	
33	15	Sebastian Bryja	Poland	4:37.04	+26.38	
34	22	Matias Hyvönen	Finland	4:37.60	+26.94	
35	53	Šimon Pavlásek	Czech Republic	4:37.62	+26.96	
36	1	Didar Kassenov	Kazakhstan	4:38.58	+27.92	
37	10	Robert Bugara	Poland	4:38.86	+28.20	
38	39	Sasha Masson	Canada	4:39.67	+29.01	
39	12	Mattéo Correia	France	4:40.13	+29.47	
40	27	Christian Steiner	Austria	4:41.07	+30.41	
41	23	Lee Jin-bok	South Korea	4:41.09	+30.43	
42	13	Ilyas Issabek	Kazakhstan	4:41.42	+30.76	
43	54	Hjalmar Michelsen	Denmark	4:42.27	+31.61	
44	29	Derek Deuling	Canada	4:42.31	+31.65	
45	63	Kryštof Zatloukal	Czech Republic	4:42.59	+31.93	
46	4	Zhang Chenghao	China	4:43.05	+32.39	
47	40	Kai Mittelsteadt	United States	4:44.09	+33.43	
48	51	Christoph Wieland	Austria	4:44.59	+33.93	
49	8	Manex Silva	Brazil	4:45.74	+35.08	
50	55	Lauris Kaparkalējs	Latvia	4:46.46	+35.80	
51	31	Volodymyr Aksiuta	Ukraine	4:47.80	+37.14	
52	50	Hugo Hinckfuss	Australia	4:48.74	+38.08	
53	47	Erik Engel	Austria	4:49.44	+38.78	
54	64	Jeon Sung-min	South Korea	4:50.54	+39.88	
55	33	Denis Tilesch	Slovakia	4:54.25	+43.59	
56	38	Robin Frommelt	Liechtenstein	4:55.52	+44.86	
57	48	Flaviu Păvălean	Romania	4:55.76	+45.10	
58	30	Matúš Oravec	Slovakia	4:56.04	+45.38	
59	66	Gu Cang	China	4:57.93	+47.27	
60	70	Otgonlkhagvyn Zolbayar	Mongolia	4:58.58	+47.92	
61	71	Aleksandar Grbović	Montenegro	5:00.74	+50.08	
62	41	Aleksandar Ognyanov	Bulgaria	5:00.85	+50.19	
63	60	Petar Perušić	Croatia	5:03.05	+52.39	
64	28	Edvinas Šimonutis	Lithuania	5:03.11	+52.45	
65	49	Miquel Auladell	Spain	5:03.92	+53.26	
66	45	Mateo Sauma	Argentina	5:04.46	+53.80	
67	68	James Slimon	Great Britain	5:05.80	+55.14	
68	61	Aleksandrs Artūrs Ļūļe	Latvia	5:10.42	+59.76	
69	59	John Mordes	Australia	5:11.00	+1:00.34	
70	43	Georgios Anastasiadis	Greece	5:12.73	+1:02.07	
71	62	Đorđe Santrač	Bosnia and Herzegovina	5:12.98	+1:02.32	
72	75	Batsükhiin Khongor	Mongolia	5:14.85	+1:04.19	
73	35	Liviu Hăngănuț	Romania	5:15.15	+1:04.49	
74	86	Mikhail Marozau	Belarus	5:21.19	+1:10.53	
75	46	Pedro Cotaro	Argentina	5:21.90	+1:11.24	
76	17	Rhaick Bomfim	Brazil	5:32.42	+1:12.76	
77	72	Irmantas Žilinskas	Lithuania	5:30.43	+1:19.77	
78	77	Einar Árni Gíslason	Iceland	5:43.76	+1:33.10	
79	69	Spyridonas Papadopoulos	Greece	5:47.50	+1:36.84	
80	56	Juan Uberuaga	Chile	5:51.63	+1:41.97	
81	79	Islam Turganbaev	Kyrgyzstan	6:03.30	+1:52.64	
82	78	Amirhossein Bandali	Iran	6:12.81	+2:02.15	
83	52	Elie Tawk	Lebanon	6:13.31	+2:02.66	
84	65	Andonaki Kostoski	North Macedonia	6:16.43	+2:05.77	
85	80	Sarawut Koedsin	Thailand	6:27.83	+2:17.17	
	73	Spartak Voskanyan	Armenia	Did not start		

=== Semifinals ===
Semifinal 1

Rank	Seed	Athlete	Country	Time	Deficit	Note
1	6	Edvin Anger	Sweden	4:16.76		Q
2	1	Nikolai Holmboe	Norway	4:17.72	+0.96	Q
3	13	Antonin Savary	Switzerland	4:19.70	+2.94	LL
4	7	Elias Keck	Germany	4:20.59	+3.83	
5	19	Oleksandr Lisohor	Ukraine	4:24.86	+8.10	
6	18	Simone Mastrobattista	Italy	4:24.92	+8.16	
7	12	Simon Jung	Germany	4:29.99	+13.23	
8	30	Alexey Loktinov	Russia	4:30.05	+13.29	
9	24	Piotr Sobiczewski	Poland	4:33.23	+16.47	
10	25	Anders Veerpalu	Estonia	4:33.63	+16.87	

Semifinal 2

Rank	Seed	Athlete	Country	Time	Deficit	Note
1	2	Aleksander Holmboe	Norway	4:17.96		Q
2	5	Albin Åström	Sweden	4:18.12	+0.16	Q
3	14	Jošt Mulej	Slovenia	4:18.27	+0.31	LL
4	8	Alexander Ståhlberg	Finland	4:19.35	+1.39	LL
5	11	Nikita Pisarev	Russia	4:20.78	+2.82	
6	17	Stian Groenli	Norway	4:21.85	+3.89	
7	20	Elia Barp	Italy	4:28.18	+10.22	
8	26	Campbell Wright	New Zealand	4:28.65	+10.69	
9	29	Kaspar Päärson	Estonia	4:33.14	+15.18	
10	23	Luc Primet	France	4:37.80	+19.84	

Semifinal 3

Rank	Seed	Athlete	Country	Time	Deficit	Note
1	3	Will Koch	United States	4:17.07		Q
2	10	Iliya Tregubov	Russia	4:17.45	+0.38	Q
3	9	Anže Gros	Slovenia	4:18.31	+1.24	LL
4	16	David Knobel	Switzerland	4:19.86	+2.79	
5	15	Ramon Riebli	Switzerland	4:27.36	+10.29	
6	4	Marius Kastner	Germany	4:28.01	+10.94	
7	27	Hleb Shakel	Belarus	4:32.16	+15.09	
8	21	Simon Chappaz	France	4:32.97	+15.90	
9	28	Brian Bushey	United States	4:35.33	+18.26	
10	22	Mathias Vacek	Czech Republic	4:39.56	+22.49	

=== Final ===
The final was held at 14:00.

Rank	Seed	Athlete	Country	Time	Deficit	Note
1st place, gold medalist(s)	1	Nikolai Holmboe	Norway	4:09.97		
2nd place, silver medalist(s)	6	Edvin Anger	Sweden	4:11.74	+1.77	
3rd place, bronze medalist(s)	5	Albin Åström	Sweden	4:13.51	+3.54	
4	3	Will Koch	United States	4:15.07	+5.10	
5	10	Iliya Tregubov	Russia	4:15.66	+5.69	
6	2	Aleksander Holmboe	Norway	4:16.50	+6.53	
7	13	Antonin Savary	Switzerland	4:21.18	+11.21	
8	9	Anže Gros	Slovenia	4:26.01	+16.04	
9	14	Jošt Mulej	Slovenia	4:35.14	+25.17	
10	8	Alexander Ståhlberg	Finland	4:39.93	+29.96	
