= Cross-country skiing at the 2020 Winter Youth Olympics – Boys' sprint =

Boys' sprint at the III Winter Youth Olympic Games
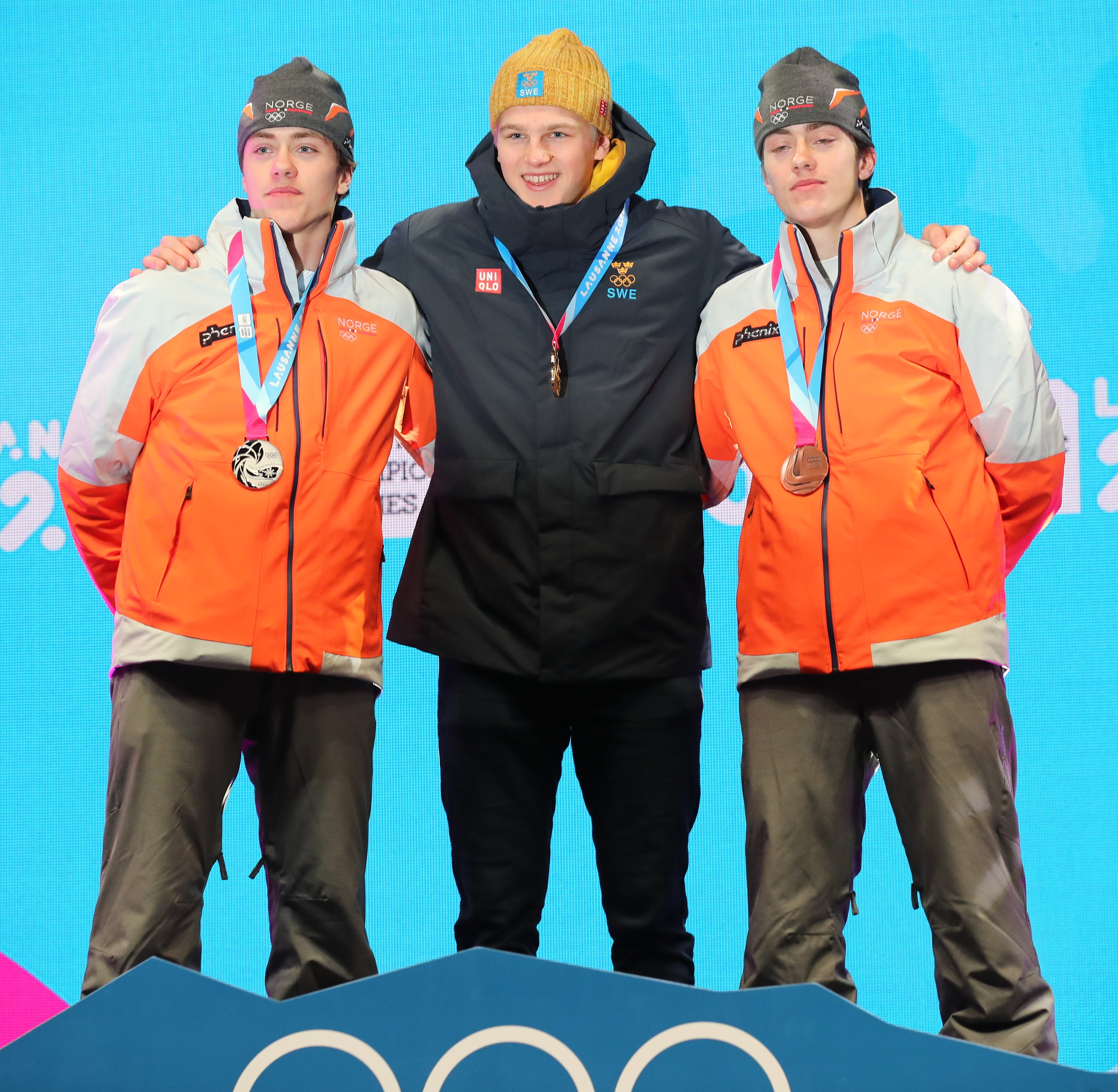
- Venue: Vallée de Joux Cross-Country Centre
- Date: 19 January
- Competitors: 87 from 47 nations

Medalists
1st place, gold medalist(s)		Edvin Anger	Sweden
2nd place, silver medalist(s)		Nikolai Holmboe	Norway
3rd place, bronze medalist(s)		Aleksander Holmboe	Norway

The boys' sprint freestyle cross-country skiing competition at the 2020 Winter Youth Olympics was held on 19 January at the Vallée de Joux Cross-Country Centre.

== Results ==
=== Qualifying ===
The qualifying was held at 12:30.

Rank	Bib	Athlete	Country	Time	Deficit	Note
1	2	Edvin Anger	Sweden	3:08.72		Q
2	20	Nikolai Holmboe	Norway	3:13.22	+4.50	Q
3	82	Iliya Tregubov	Russia	3:15.23	+6.51	Q
4	26	Aleksander Holmboe	Norway	3:16.72	+8.00	Q
5	9	Alexander Ståhlberg	Finland	3:16.82	+8.10	Q
6	7	Jošt Mulej	Slovenia	3:17.03	+8.31	Q
7	3	Ramon Riebli	Switzerland	3:17.24	+8.52	Q
8	16	Nikita Pisarev	Russia	3:18.97	+10.25	Q
9	18	Albin Åström	Sweden	3:19.20	+10.48	Q
10	19	Marius Kastner	Germany	3:19.51	+10.79	Q
11	5	Anže Gros	Slovenia	3:19.65	+10.93	Q
12	10	Robert Bugara	Poland	3:20.73	+12.01	Q
13	58	Kaspar Päärson	Estonia	3:21.24	+12.52	Q
14	83	Elias Keck	Germany	3:21.78	+13.06	Q
15	42	Mathias Vacek	Czech Republic	3:21.80	+13.08	Q
16	24	Antonin Savary	Switzerland	3:21.98	+13.26	Q
17	14	Will Koch	United States	3:22.98	+14.26	Q
18	25	Campbell Wright	New Zealand	3:23.22	+14.50	Q
19	29	Derek Deuling	Canada	3:23.28	+14.56	Q
20	6	Oleksandr Lisohor	Ukraine	3:23.95	+15.23	Q
21	53	Šimon Pavlásek	Czech Republic	3:24.06	+15.34	Q
22	21	Luc Primet	France	3:24.46	+15.74	Q
23	68	Andrea Gartner	Italy	3:24.51	+15.79	Q
24	85	Simon Jung	Germany	3:24.90	+16.18	Q
25	36	Veeti Pyykkö	Finland	3:25.57	+16.85	Q
26	32	Simon Chappaz	France	3:25.66	+16.94	Q
27	12	Mattéo Correia	France	3:26.01	+17.29	Q
28	77	Elia Barp	Italy	3:26.19	+17.47	Q
29	44	Stian Groenli	Norway	3:26.28	+17.56	Q
30	22	Matias Hyvönen	Finland	3:26.51	+17.79	Q
31	84	Alexey Loktinov	Russia	3:27.83	+19.11	
32	86	Hleb Shakel	Belarus	3:28.28	+19.56	
33	27	Christian Steiner	Austria	3:28.39	+19.67	
34	47	Erik Engel	Austria	3:29.13	+20.41	
35	37	David Knobel	Switzerland	3:29.56	+20.84	
36	54	Hjalmar Michelsen	Denmark	3:29.65	+20.93	
37	13	Ilyas Issabek	Kazakhstan	3:29.88	+21.16	
38	39	Sasha Masson	Canada	3:30.55	+21.83	
39	8	Manex Silva	Brazil	3:31.30	+22.58	
40	64	Kryštof Zatloukal	Czech Republic	3:31.32	+22.60	
41	4	Zhang Chenghao	China	3:31.41	+22.69	
42	23	Lee Jin-bok	South Korea	3:31.58	+22.86	
43	51	Christoph Wieland	Austria	3:32.15	+23.43	
44	57	Brian Bushey	United States	3:33.18	+24.46	
45	35	Liviu Hăngănuț	Romania	3:33.49	+24.77	
46	38	Robin Frommelt	Liechtenstein	3:34.10	+25.38	
47	55	Lauris Kaparkalējs	Latvia	3:34.36	+25.64	
48	48	Flaviu Păvălean	Romania	3:35.04	+26.32	
49	34	Anders Veerpalu	Estonia	3:35.21	+26.49	
50	17	Rhaick Bomfim	Brazil	3:35.56	+26.84	
51	1	Didar Kassenov	Kazakhstan	3:36.54	+27.82	
52	31	Volodymyr Aksiuta	Ukraine	3:37.46	+28.74	
53	75	Simone Mastrobattista	Italy	3:37.99	+29.27	
54	11	Piotr Sobiczewski	Poland	3:38.54	+29.82	
55	62	Aleksandrs Artūrs Ļūļe	Latvia	3:39.12	+30.40	
56	28	Edvinas Šimonutis	Lithuania	3:40.28	+31.56	
57	67	Gu Cang	China	3:40.30	+31.58	
58	65	Jeon Sung-min	South Korea	3:41.88	+33.16	
59	41	Aleksandar Ognyanov	Bulgaria	3:41.97	+33.25	
60	30	Matúš Oravec	Slovakia	3:42.66	+33.94	
61	71	Otgonlkhagvyn Zolbayar	Mongolia	3:44.37	+35.65	
62	60	Petar Perušić	Croatia	3:46.38	+37.66	
63	69	James Slimon	Great Britain	3:47.86	+39.14	
64	50	Hugo Hinckfuss	Australia	3:48.63	+39.91	
65	61	Mehmet Türün	Turkey	3:49.26	+40.54	
66	72	Aleksandar Grbović	Montenegro	3:50.09	+41.37	
67	59	John Mordes	Australia	3:51.18	+42.46	
68	87	Mikhail Marozau	Belarus	3:51.55	+42.83	
69	15	Sebastian Bryja	Poland	3:52.56	+43.84	
70	43	Georgios Anastasiadis	Greece	3:52.72	+44.00	
71	49	Miquel Auladell	Spain	3:53.05	+44.33	
72	45	Mateo Sauma	Argentina	3:54.39	+45.67	
73	33	Denis Tilesch	Slovakia	3:58.74	+50.02	
74	76	Batsükhiin Khongor	Mongolia	4:02.06	+53.34	
75	63	Đorđe Santrač	Bosnia and Herzegovina	4:06.17	+57.45	
76	46	Pedro Cotaro	Argentina	4:09.75	+1:01.03	
77	66	Andonaki Kostoski	North Macedonia	4:10.44	+1:01.72	
78	74	Spartak Voskanyan	Armenia	4:14.23	+1:05.51	
79	78	Einar Árni Gíslason	Iceland	4:22.86	+1:14.14	
80	56	Juan Uberuaga	Chile	4:24.67	+1:15.95	
81	73	Irmantas Žilinskas	Lithuania	4:29.93	+1:21.21	
82	79	Amirhossein Bandali	Iran	4:38.39	+1:29.67	
83	81	Sarawut Koedsin	Thailand	4:38.79	+1:30.07	
84	52	Elie Tawk	Lebanon	4:39.81	+1:31.09	
85	80	Islam Turganbaev	Kyrgyzstan	4:46.69	+1:37.97	
86	70	Spyridonas Papadopoulos	Greece	5:06.00	+1:57.28	
	40	Kai Mittelsteadt	United States	Did not start		

=== Quarterfinals ===
Quarterfinal 1

Rank	Seed	Athlete	Country	Time	Deficit	Note
1	1	Edvin Anger	Sweden	3:23.84		Q
2	11	Anže Gros	Slovenia	3:24.72	+0.88	Q
3	10	Marius Kastner	Germany	3:25.70	+1.86	
4	21	Šimon Pavlásek	Czech Republic	3:30.97	+7.13	
5	30	Matias Hyvönen	Finland	3:36.14	+12.30	
6	20	Oleksandr Lisohor	Ukraine	3:51.41	+27.57	

Quarterfinal 2

Rank	Seed	Athlete	Country	Time	Deficit	Note
1	4	Aleksander Holmboe	Norway	3:23.33		Q
2	14	Elias Keck	Germany	3:23.51	+0.18	Q
3	7	Ramon Riebli	Switzerland	3:24.46	+1.13	
4	17	Will Koch	United States	3:26.22	+2.89	
5	27	Mattéo Correia	France	3:26.23	+2.90	
6	24	Simon Jung	Germany	3:28.90	+5.57	

Quarterfinal 3

Rank	Seed	Athlete	Country	Time	Deficit	Note
1	5	Alexander Ståhlberg	Finland	3:20.49		Q
2	16	Antonin Savary	Switzerland	3:22.39	+1.90	Q
3	15	Mathias Vacek	Czech Republic	3:23.62	+3.13	LL
4	25	Veeti Pyykkö	Finland	3:23.77	+3.28	LL
5	26	Simon Chappaz	France	3:32.35	+11.86	
6	6	Jošt Mulej	Slovenia	4:09.12	+48.63	

Quarterfinal 4

Rank	Seed	Athlete	Country	Time	Deficit	Note
1	2	Nikolai Holmboe	Norway	3:26.90		Q
2	9	Albin Åström	Sweden	3:27.23	+0.33	Q
3	22	Luc Primet	France	3:27.35	+0.45	
4	19	Derek Deuling	Canada	3:28.57	+1.67	
5	12	Robert Bugara	Poland	3:31.33	+4.43	
6	29	Stian Groenli	Norway	3:47.97	+21.07	

Quarterfinal 5

Rank	Seed	Athlete	Country	Time	Deficit	Note
1	3	Iliya Tregubov	Russia	3:24.51		Q
2	8	Nikita Pisarev	Russia	3:25.34	+0.83	Q
3	28	Elia Barp	Italy	3:26.78	+2.27	
4	23	Andrea Gartner	Italy	3:28.14	+3.63	
5	18	Campbell Wright	New Zealand	3:28.49	+3.98	
6	13	Kaspar Päärson	Estonia	3:57.83	+33.32	

=== Semifinals ===
Semifinal 1

Rank	Seed	Athlete	Country	Time	Deficit	Note
1	1	Edvin Anger	Sweden	3:13.09		Q
2	4	Aleksander Holmboe	Norway	3:13.48	+0.39	Q
3	5	Alexander Ståhlberg	Finland	3:13.77	+0.68	LL
4	11	Anže Gros	Slovenia	3:14.19	+1.10	LL
5	14	Elias Keck	Germany	3:16.44	+3.35	
6	25	Veeti Pyykkö	Finland	3:17.87	+4.78	

Semifinal 2

Rank	Seed	Athlete	Country	Time	Deficit	Note
1	9	Albin Åström	Sweden	3:16.65		Q
2	2	Nikolai Holmboe	Norway	3:16.97	+0.32	Q
3	8	Nikita Pisarev	Russia	3:17.36	+0.71	
4	3	Iliya Tregubov	Russia	3:17.87	+1.22	
5	16	Antonin Savary	Switzerland	3:21.27	+4.62	
6	15	Mathias Vacek	Czech Republic	3:23.77	+7.12	

=== Final ===
The final was held at 15:32.

Rank	Seed	Athlete	Country	Time	Deficit	Note
1st place, gold medalist(s)	1	Edvin Anger	Sweden	3:10.47		
2nd place, silver medalist(s)	2	Nikolai Holmboe	Norway	3:10.97	+0.50	
3rd place, bronze medalist(s)	4	Aleksander Holmboe	Norway	3:15.51	+5.04	
4	9	Albin Åström	Sweden	3:15.81	+5.34	
5	11	Anže Gros	Slovenia	3:18.53	+8.06	
6	5	Alexander Ståhlberg	Finland	3:19.04	+8.57	
