= Luge at the 2020 Winter Youth Olympics =

Luge at the III Winter Youth Olympic Games
- Venue: St. Moritz-Celerina Olympic Bobrun
- Dates: 17–20 January
- Competitors: 86 from 22 nations

Luge at the 2020 Winter Youth Olympics took place at the St. Moritz-Celerina Olympic Bobrun from 17 to 20 January 2020.

== Medal summary ==
=== Medal table ===
Rank	Nation	Gold	Silver	Bronze	Total
1	Germany	3	2	1	6
2	Latvia	1	1	2	4
2	Russia	1	1	2	4
4	Canada	0	1	0	1
Totals (4 entries)		5	5	5	15

=== Medalists ===
Event	Gold		Silver		Bronze	
Boys' singles	Gints Bērziņš; Latvia	1:48.045	Pavel Repilov; Russia	1:48.229	Timon Grancagnolo; Germany	1:48.836
Boys' doubles	Moritz Jäger; Valentin Steudte; Germany	1:49.649	Kaspars Rinks; Ardis Liepiņš; Latvia	1:49.951	Mikhail Karnaukhov; Iurii Chirva; Russia	1:50.325
Girls' singles	Merle Fräbel; Germany	1:49.687	Jessica Degenhardt; Germany	1:49.895	Diana Loginova; Russia	1:49.966
Girls' doubles	Jessica Degenhardt; Vanessa Schneider; Germany	1:51.443	Caitlin Nash; Natalie Corless; Canada	1:52.709	Viktorija Ziediņa; Selīna Elizabete Zvilna; Latvia	1:53.043
Team relay	Russia; Diana Loginova; Pavel Repilov; Mikhail Karnaukhov / Iurii Chirva	2:54.072	Germany; Merle Fräbel; Timon Grancagnolo; Moritz Jäger / Valentin Steudte	2:54.622	Latvia; Justīne Maskale; Gints Bērziņš; Kaspars Rinks / Ardis Liepiņš	2:54.954

== Qualification ==
A total of 100 lugers will qualify to compete (50 per gender). A NOC can enter a maximum of two singles luge and one double. Quotas were officially awarded via the FIL Youth World Cup rankings as of o December 9, 2019.

=== Summary ===
NOC	Boys' singles	Boys' doubles	Girls' singles	Girls' doubles	Total athletes
Austria	2		2		4
Bosnia and Herzegovina	1				1
Bulgaria	2	X			2
Canada			2	X	3
China	1				1
Czech Republic	1		1	X	4
Georgia	2				2
Germany	2	X	2	X	8
Italy	2		2		4
Japan			1		1
Latvia	2	X	2	X	7
Moldova	1		1	X	3
New Zealand	1		1		2
Norway			1		1
Poland	1	X	1	X	6
Romania	1	X	1	X	6
Russia	2	X	2	X	8
Slovakia	2	X	2	X	5
Slovenia		X	1		3
Chinese Taipei	2	X			2
Ukraine	1	X	1	X	6
United States	2	X	1	X	7
Total: 22 NOCs	28	11	24	11	86
