= Skeleton at the 2020 Winter Youth Olympics – Girls' =

Girls' skeleton at the III Winter Youth Olympic Games
- Venue: St. Moritz-Celerina Olympic Bobrun
- Dates: 19 January
- Competitors: 20 from 14 nations

Medalists
1st place, gold medalist(s)		Anastasiia Tsyganova	Russia
2nd place, silver medalist(s)		Josefa Schellmoser	Germany
3rd place, bronze medalist(s)		Sissi Schrödl	Germany

The girls' skeleton event at the 2020 Winter Youth Olympics took place on 19 January at the St. Moritz-Celerina Olympic Bobrun.

== Results ==
The first run was held at 14:00 and the second run at 15:15.

Rank	Bib	Athlete	Country	Run 1	Rank 1	Run 2	Rank 2	Total	Behind
1st place, gold medalist(s)	7	Anastasiia Tsyganova	Russia	1:11.09	2	1:11.41	1	2:22.50	
2nd place, silver medalist(s)	13	Josefa Schellmoser	Germany	1:11.04	1	1:11.49	3	2:22.53	+0.03
3rd place, bronze medalist(s)	12	Sissi Schrödl	Germany	1:11.31	3	1:11.64	4	2:22.95	+0.45
4	1	Jill Gander	Switzerland	1:12.06	5	1:11.64	4	2:23.70	+1.20
5	8	Victoria Steiner	Austria	1:11.99	4	1:11.75	6	2:23.74	+1.24
6	17	Lovisa Ewald	Sweden	1:12.58	9	1:11.43	2	2:24.01	+1.51
7	4	Zhao Dan	China	1:12.27	7	1:12.06	7	2:24.33	+1.83
8	15	Polina Tiurina	Russia	1:12.27	7	1:12.11	8	2:24.38	+1.88
9	14	Annia Unterscheider	Austria	1:12.17	6	1:12.27	9	2:24.44	+1.94
10	11	Nele Kaschinski	Germany	1:12.66	10	1:12.59	10	2:25.25	+2.75
11	18	Aline Pelckmans	Belgium	1:13.05	13	1:12.94	11	2:25.99	+3.49
12	5	Hallie Clarke	Canada	1:12.95	12	1:13.25	13	2:26.20	+3.70
13	16	Emma-Sunshine Burkard	Switzerland	1:12.87	11	1:13.45	14	2:26.32	+3.82
14	19	Annija Miļūne	Latvia	1:13.87	15	1:13.16	12	2:27.03	+4.53
15	10	Lansiia Dmytriieva	Ukraine	1:13.23	14	1:13.89	15	2:27.12	+4.62
16	20	Katharina Eigenmann	Liechtenstein	1:14.44	16	1:14.92	17	2:29.36	+6.86
17	3	Zuzanna Klocek	Poland	1:15.23	17	1:14.48	16	2:29.71	+7.21
18	2	Paulina Ewald Gröndal	Sweden	1:15.62	18	1:16.16	18	2:31.78	+9.28
19	9	Larissa Cândido	Brazil	1:15.85	19	1:17.46	19	2:33.31	+10.81
20	6	Lu Chia-hsin	Chinese Taipei	1:18.49	20	1:18.73	20	2:37.22	+14.72
