= Brazil at the 2020 Winter Youth Olympics =

- IOC code: BRA
- NOC: Brazilian Olympic Committee
- Website: www.cob.org.br (in Portuguese)

in Lausanne
- Competitors: 12 in 6 sports
- Medals: Gold 0 Silver 0 Bronze 0 Total 0

Winter Youth Olympics appearances (overview)
- 2012; 2016; 2020; 2024

Brazil competed at the 2020 Winter Youth Olympics in Lausanne, Switzerland from 9 to 22 January 2020.

== Biathlon ==
Girls

Athlete	Event	Time	Misses	Rank
Taynara da Silva	Sprint	28:55.6	6 (2+4)	94
Taynara da Silva	Individual	53:23.9	13 (2+2+4+5)	92

== Bobsleigh ==
Athlete	Event	Run 1		Run 2		Total	
Athlete	Event	Time	Rank	Time	Rank	Time	Rank
Gustavo dos Santos Ferreira	Boys'	1:14.33	13	1:14.62	13	2:28.95	13

== Cross-country skiing ==
Boys

Athlete	Event	Qualification		Quarterfinal		Semifinal		Final	
Athlete	Event	Time	Rank	Time	Rank	Time	Rank	Time	Rank
Rhaick Bomfim	10 km classic	—N/a						32:16.7	62
Rhaick Bomfim	Free sprint	3:35.56	50	Did not advance					
Rhaick Bomfim	Cross-country cross	5:32.42	76	Did not advance					
Manex Silva	10 km classic	—N/a						31:13.2	55
Manex Silva	Free sprint	3:31.30	39	Did not advance					
Manex Silva	Cross-country cross	4:45.74	49	Did not advance					

Girls

Athlete	Event	Qualification		Quarterfinal		Semifinal		Final	
Athlete	Event	Time	Rank	Time	Rank	Time	Rank	Time	Rank
Taynara da Silva	5 km classic	—N/a						22:57.7	74
Taynara da Silva	Free sprint	3:36.85	74	Did not advance					
Taynara da Silva	Cross-country cross	7:17.58	77	Did not advance					
Eduarda Ribera	5 km classic	—N/a						DNS	
Eduarda Ribera	Free sprint	3:34.05	72	Did not advance					
Eduarda Ribera	Cross-country cross	6:56.14	73	Did not advance					

== Curling ==
Brazil qualified a mixed team of four athletes.

Mixed team

Team	Event	Group Stage						Quarterfinal	Semifinal	Final / BM	
Team	Event	Opposition Score	Opposition Score	Opposition Score	Opposition Score	Opposition Score	Rank	Opposition Score	Opposition Score	Opposition Score	Rank
Vitor Melo; Gabriela Rogic Farias; Michael Velve; Leticia Cid	Mixed team	Germany; L 1–15	China; L 1–14	Denmark; L 3–12	Hungary; L 2–13	Switzerland; L 2–10	6	did not advance			24

Mixed doubles

Athletes	Event	Round of 48	Round of 24	Round of 12	Round of 6	Semifinals	Final / BM	
Athletes	Event	Opposition Result	Opposition Result	Opposition Result	Opposition Result	Opposition Result	Opposition Result	Rank
Leticia Cid (BRA); Hunter Walker (NZL)	Mixed doubles	Deschenes (CAN) / Gastó (ESP); L 9–10	did not advance					
Alina Fakhurtdinova (RUS); Vitor Melo (BRA)	Mixed doubles	Szmidt (POL) / Rankin (GBR); L 2–8	did not advance					
Gabriela Rogic (BRA); Asei Nakahara (JPN)	Mixed doubles	Antes (GER) / Szarvus (HUN); L 2–9	did not advance					
Nora Østgård (NOR); Michael Velve (BRA)	Mixed doubles	Farková (CZE) / Landelius (SWE); L 5–8	did not advance					

== Skeleton ==
Athlete	Event	Run 1		Run 2		Total	
Athlete	Event	Time	Rank	Time	Rank	Time	Rank
Lucas Carvalho	Boys'	1:21.62	20	1:24.89	20	2:46.51	20
Larissa Cândido	Girls'	1:15.85	19	1:17.46	19	2:33.31	19

== Snowboarding ==
Snowboard cross

Athlete	Event	Group heats		Semifinal	Final
Athlete	Event	Points	Rank	Position	Position
Noah Bethonico	Boys' snowboard cross	14	6	did not advance	

Athlete	Event	Pre-Heats	Quarterfinals	Semifinal	Final
Athlete	Event	Position	Position	Position	Position
Mixed Team 5 Amber Essex (AUS); Zoe Michael (AUS); Noath Bethonico (BRA); Jasper Cobcroft (AUS)	Team snowboard ski cross	Bye	DNS		

== See also ==
- Brazil at the 2020 Summer Olympics
