= Alpine skiing at the 2020 Winter Youth Olympics – Girls' giant slalom =

Girls' giant slalom at the III Winter Youth Olympic Games
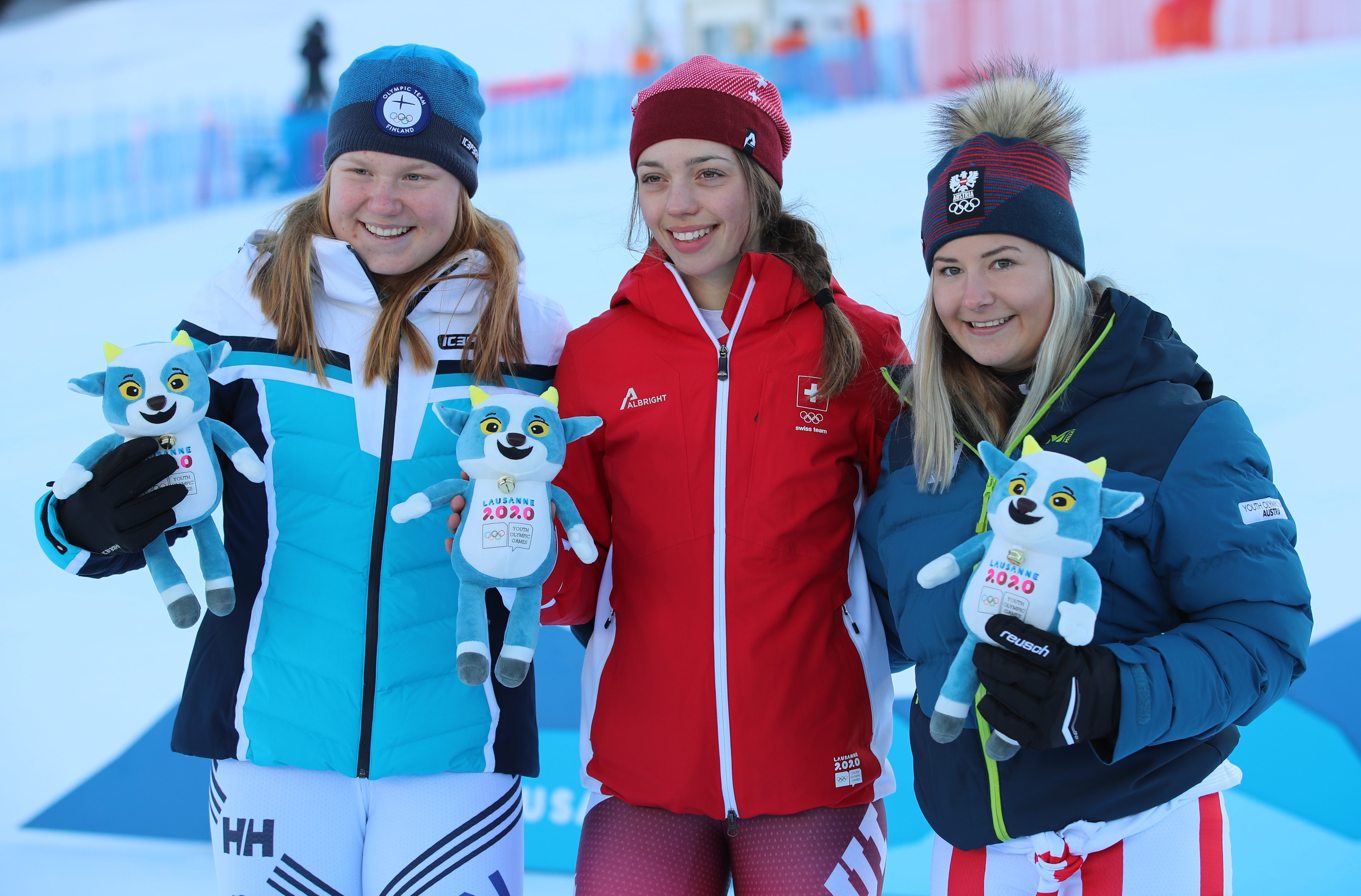
- The podium during the Mascot Ceremony.
- Venue: Les Diablerets, Switzerland
- Date: 12 January
- Competitors: 78 from 57 nations
- Winning time: 2:08.68

Medalists
1st place, gold medalist(s)		Amélie Klopfenstein	Switzerland
2nd place, silver medalist(s)		Rosa Pohjolainen	Finland
3rd place, bronze medalist(s)		Amanda Salzgeber	Austria

The girls' giant slalom competition of the 2020 Winter Youth Olympics was held at the Les Diablerets Alpine Centre, Switzerland, on 12 January.

== Results ==
The race was started at 10:00 (Run 1) and 12:45 (Run 2).

Rank	Bib	Name	Country	Run 1	Rank	Run 2	Rank	Total	Diff.
1st place, gold medalist(s)	7	Amélie Klopfenstein	Switzerland	1:05.61	5	1:03.07	2	2:08.68	
2nd place, silver medalist(s)	13	Rosa Pohjolainen	Finland	1:04.99	1	1:03.83	6	2:08.82	+0.14
3rd place, bronze medalist(s)	15	Amanda Salzgeber	Austria	1:05.66	6	1:03.17	3	2:08.83	+0.15
4	2	Emma Resnick	United States	1:06.37	12	1:02.79	1	2:09.16	+0.48
5	11	Caitlin McFarlane	France	1:05.48	3	1:03.78	5	2:09.26	+0.58
6	14	Lena Volken	Switzerland	1:05.80	7	1:03.61	4	2:09.41	+0.73
7	6	Hanna Aronsson Elfman	Sweden	1:05.38	2	1:04.04	7	2:09.42	+0.74
8	4	Nicola Rountree-Williams	United States	1:05.95	8	1:04.06	8	2:10.01	+1.33
9	3	Sophie Mathiou	Italy	1:06.22	10	1:04.22	9	2:10.44	+1.76
10	18	Alica Calaba	Italy	1:06.26	11	1:04.23	10	2:10.49	+1.81
11	22	Maria Niederndorfer	Austria	1:06.19	9	1:04.55	12	2:10.74	+2.06
12	5	Chiara Pogneaux	France	1:06.84	14	1:04.81	14	2:11.65	+2.97
13	16	Wilma Marklund	Sweden	1:06.84	14	1:04.82	15	2:11.66	+2.98
14	33	Rebeka Jančová	Slovakia	1:07.15	18	1:04.67	13	2:11.82	+3.14
15	1	Delia Durrer	Switzerland	1:07.10	17	1:05.18	18	2:12.28	+3.60
16	30	Cathinka Lunder	Norway	1:07.30	20	1:05.17	17	2:12.47	+3.79
17	10	Annette Belfrond	Italy	1:08.69	28	1:04.34	11	2:13.03	+4.35
18	17	Barbora Nováková	Czech Republic	1:07.42	24	1:05.81	20	2:13.23	+4.55
19	25	Jana Suau	Spain	1:08.26	25	1:04.99	16	2:13.25	+4.57
20	31	Anastasia Trofimova	Russia	1:09.09	29	1:05.53	19	2:14.62	+5.94
21	44	Christina Bühler	Liechtenstein	1:08.39	27	1:06.44	21	2:14.83	+6.15
22	28	Carla Mijares	Andorra	1:07.17	19	1:07.98	22	2:15.15	+6.47
23	50	Lee Hae-un	South Korea	1:11.17	38	1:08.02	23	2:19.19	+10.51
24	57	Julia Zlatkova	Bulgaria	1:10.30	33	1:09.08	26	2:19.38	+10.70
25	47	Zoe Michael	Australia	1:11.03	37	1:08.76	24	2:19.79	+11.11
26	12	Yuka Wakatsuki	Japan	1:10.59	34	1:09.44	27	2:20.03	+11.35
27	43	Sofía Saint Antonin	Argentina	1:10.70	35	1:09.63	28	2:20.33	+11.65
28	48	Kristiane Rør Madsen	Denmark	1:10.71	36	1:09.98	29	2:20.69	+12.01
29	52	Gabriela Hopek	Poland	1:12.05	40	1:09.01	25	2:21.06	+12.38
30	54	Katie Crawford	New Zealand	1:12.58	41	1:10.67	30	2:23.25	+14.57
31	59	Diana Andreea Renţea	Romania	1:13.69	42	1:10.88	31	2:24.57	+15.89
32	63	Smiltė Bieliūnaitė	Lithuania	1:18.02	46	1:17.37	32	2:35.39	+26.71
33	61	Maria Nikoleta Kaltsogianni	Greece	1:21.55	48	1:17.85	33	2:39.40	+30.72
34	64	Wang Shengjie	China	1:25.66	51	1:21.23	34	2:46.89	+38.21
35	69	Georgia Epiphaniou	Cyprus	1:23.88	50	1:23.40	35	2:47.28	+38.60
36	71	Ana Wahleithner	Philippines	1:34.46	56	1:29.77	36	3:04.23	+55.55
37	74	Nichakan Chinupun	Thailand	1:34.48	57	1:30.90	37	3:05.38	+56.70
38	46	Maisa Kivimäki	Finland	1:11.83	39	Did not start			
39	77	Nino Kurtanidze	Georgia	1:27.78	52	Did not start			
40	75	Hanle van der Merwe	South Africa	1:34.18	54	Did not start			
	8	Sarah Brown	Canada	1:09.19	30	Did not finish			
	9	Emma Sahlin	Sweden	1:07.34	21	Did not finish			
	19	Alizée Dahon	France	1:08.31	26	Did not finish			
	20	Teresa Fritzenwallner	Austria	1:06.95	16	Did not finish			
	24	Katharina Haas	Germany	1:05.50	4	Did not finish			
	29	Malin Sofie Sund	Norway	1:07.35	22	Did not finish			
	32	Daisi Daniels	Great Britain	1:07.39	23	Did not finish			
	34	Sara Madelene Marøy	Norway	1:09.81	32	Did not finish			
	37	Dženifera Ģērmane	Latvia	1:06.47	13	Did not finish			
	42	Sophie Foster	Great Britain	1:09.36	31	Did not finish			
	51	Esma Alić	Bosnia and Herzegovina	1:13.74	44	Did not finish			
	60	Abigail Vieira	Trinidad and Tobago	1:15.03	45	Did not finish			
	62	Sarah Escobar	Ecuador	1:21.77	49	Did not finish			
	68	Daniela Payen	Mexico	1:18.22	47	Did not finish			
	73	Artemis Hoseyni	Iran	1:28.60	53	Did not finish			
	78	Maria Issa	Lebanon	1:38.65	58	Did not finish			
	56	Kateryna Shepilenko	Ukraine	1:13.69	42	Disqualified			
	76	Tamara Popović	Montenegro	1:34.29	55	Disqualified			
	21	Nika Murovec	Slovenia	Did not finish					
	23	Alice Marchessault	Canada	Did not finish					
	26	Zita Tóth	Hungary	Did not finish					
	27	Matilde Schwencke	Chile	Did not finish					
	35	Lara Klein	Germany	Did not finish					
	36	Lina Knifič	Slovenia	Did not finish					
	38	Anja Oplotnik	Slovenia	Did not finish					
	39	Vanina Guerillot	Portugal	Did not finish					
	40	Noa Szollos	Israel	Did not finish					
	41	Esperanza Pereyra	Argentina	Did not finish					
	45	Zoja Grbović	Serbia	Did not finish					
	49	Adalbjörg Lilly Hauksdóttir	Iceland	Did not finish					
	53	Mia Nuriah Freudweiler	Pakistan	Did not finish					
	55	Isabella Davis	Australia	Did not finish					
	58	Emma Austin	Ireland	Did not finish					
	65	Alexandra Troitskaya	Kazakhstan	Did not finish					
	66	Mina Baştan	Turkey	Did not finish					
	67	Lee Wen-yi	Chinese Taipei	Did not finish					
	70	Valeriya Kovaleva	Uzbekistan	Did not finish					
	72	Audrey King	Hong Kong	Did not finish					
