= Luge at the 2020 Winter Youth Olympics – Boys' doubles =

Boys' doubles at the III Winter Youth Olympic Games
- Venue: St. Moritz-Celerina Olympic Bobrun
- Dates: 17 January
- Competitors: 20 from 10 nations
- Winning time: 1:49.649

Medalists
| 1st place, gold medalist(s) | | Moritz Jäger; Valentin Steudte | Germany |
| 2nd place, silver medalist(s) | | Kaspars Rinks; Ardis Liepiņš | Latvia |
| 3rd place, bronze medalist(s) | | Mikhail Karnaukhov; Iurii Chirva | Russia |

The boys' doubles luge at the 2020 Winter Youth Olympics took place on 17 January at the St. Moritz-Celerina Olympic Bobrun.

== Results ==
The first run was held at 11:00 and the second run at 11:50.

| Rank | Bib | Athlete | Country | Run 1 | Rank 1 | Run 2 | Rank 2 | Total | Behind |
|---|---|---|---|---|---|---|---|---|---|
| 1st place, gold medalist(s) | 2 | Moritz Jäger; Valentin Steudte | Germany | 54.824 | 1 | 54.825 | 2 | 1:49.649 | |
| 2nd place, silver medalist(s) | 4 | Kaspars Rinks; Ardis Liepiņš | Latvia | 54.971 | 2 | 54.980 | 3 | 1:49.951 | +0.302 |
| 3rd place, bronze medalist(s) | 5 | Mikhail Karnaukhov; Iurii Chirva | Russia | 55.698 | 6 | 54.627 | 1 | 1:50.325 | +0.676 |
| 4 | 1 | Kacper Imiołek; Łukasz Maćkała | Poland | 55.467 | 3 | 55.545 | 4 | 1:51.012 | +1.363 |
| 5 | 7 | Vratislav Varga; Metod Majerčák | Slovakia | 55.612 | 4 | 55.586 | 5 | 1:51.198 | +1.549 |
| 6 | 10 | Yang Shih-hsun; Yeh Meng-jhe | Chinese Taipei | 55.948 | 7 | 55.911 | 6 | 1:51.859 | +2.210 |
| 7 | 9 | Milen Milanov; Nedyalko Ivanov | Bulgaria | 56.580 | 8 | 57.185 | 7 | 1:53.765 | +4.116 |
| 8 | 3 | Sam Day; Sam Eckert | United States | 55.624 | 5 | 58.233 | 9 | 1:53.857 | +4.208 |
| 9 | 8 | Lovro Kovačič; Tian Badžukov | Slovenia | 58.879 | 9 | 57.561 | 8 | 1:56.440 | +6.791 |
| | 11 | Vadym Mykyievych; Bohdan Babura | Ukraine | Disqualified | | | | | |
| | 6 | Răzvan Turea; Sebastian Motzca | Romania | Did not start | | | | | |
