= Alpine skiing at the 2020 Winter Youth Olympics – Girls' slalom =

Girls' slalom at the III Winter Youth Olympic Games
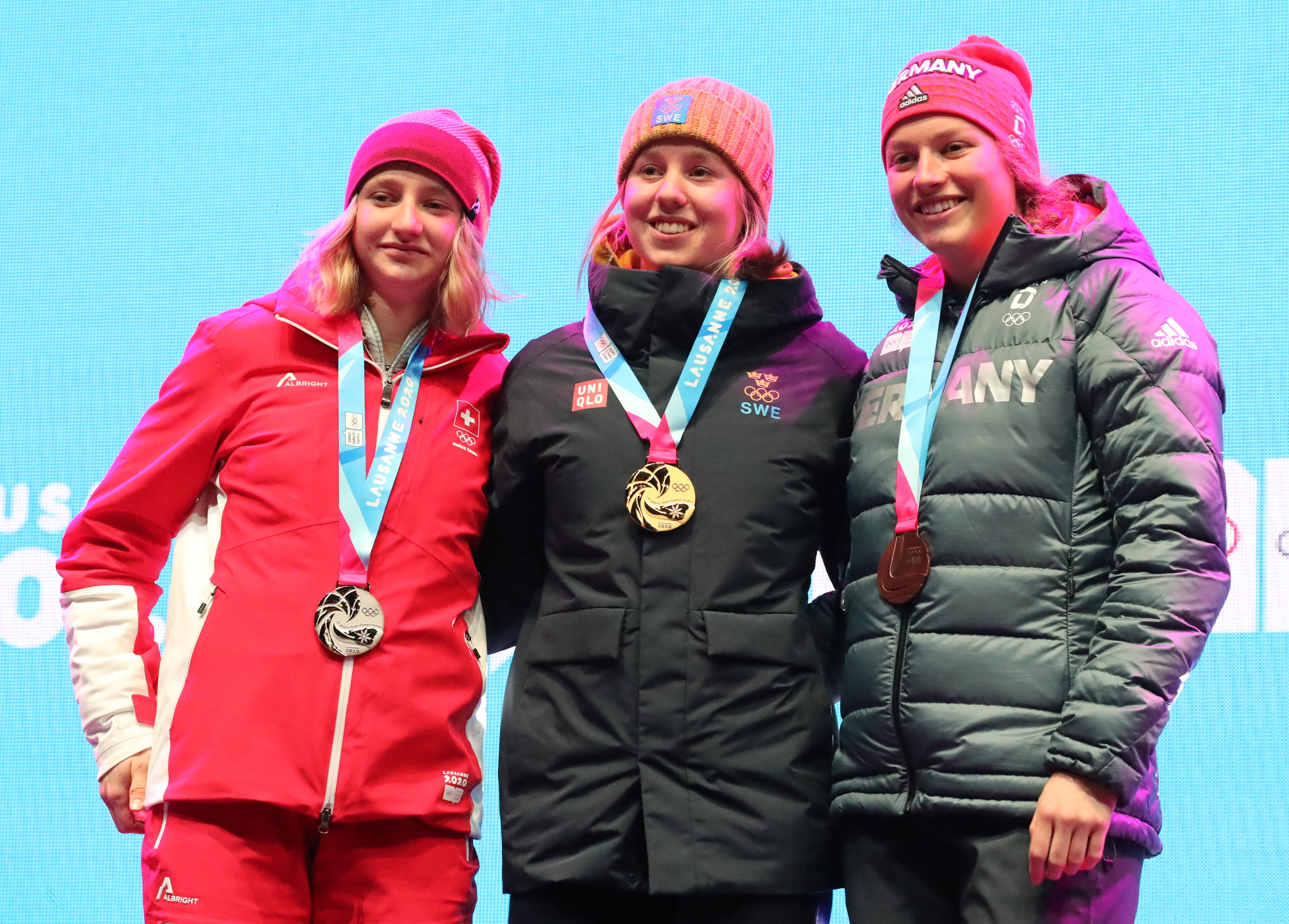
- Venue: Les Diablerets, Switzerland
- Date: 14 January
- Competitors: 76 from 55 nations
- Winning time: 1:29.82

Medalists
1st place, gold medalist(s)		Emma Sahlin	Sweden
2nd place, silver medalist(s)		Lena Volken	Switzerland
3rd place, bronze medalist(s)		Lara Klein	Germany

The girls' slalom competition of the 2020 Winter Youth Olympics was held at the Les Diablerets Alpine Centre, Switzerland, on 14 January.

== Results ==
The race was started at 09:30 (Run 1) and 13:45 (Run 2).

Rank	Bib	Name	Country	Run 1	Rank	Run 2	Rank	Total	Diff.
1st place, gold medalist(s)	3	Emma Sahlin	Sweden	45.25	2	44.57	4	1:29.82	
2nd place, silver medalist(s)	15	Lena Volken	Switzerland	45.22	1	44.78	6	1:30.00	+0.18
3rd place, bronze medalist(s)	19	Lara Klein	Germany	45.63	5	44.62	5	1:30.25	+0.43
4	6	Wilma Marklund	Sweden	46.16	7	44.33	1	1:30.49	+0.67
5	7	Hanna Aronsson Elfman	Sweden	45.49	3	45.31	10	1:30.80	+0.98
6	22	Carla Mijares	Andorra	45.91	6	44.90	7	1:30.81	+0.99
7	8	Rosa Pohjolainen	Finland	46.45	11	44.47	2	1:30.92	+1.10
8	32	Teresa Fritzenwallner	Austria	46.86	13	44.49	3	1:31.35	+1.53
9	29	Anastasia Trofimova	Russia	46.21	8	45.94	14	1:32.15	+2.33
10	20	Maria Niederndorfer	Austria	47.18	16	44.98	8	1:32.16	+2.34
11	14	Chiara Pogneaux	France	46.53	12	45.64	12	1:32.17	+2.35
12	33	Malin Sofie Sund	Norway	46.43	10	46.67	16	1:33.10	+3.28
13	2	Nicola Rountree-Williams	United States	47.29	18	45.84	13	1:33.13	+3.31
14	11	Alizée Dahon	France	48.40	22	45.24	9	1:33.64	+3.82
15	35	Rebeka Jančová	Slovakia	48.41	23	45.60	11	1:34.01	+4.19
16	44	Alica Calaba	Italy	48.21	20	46.61	15	1:34.82	+5.00
17	21	Nika Murovec	Slovenia	47.28	17	47.56	20	1:34.84	+5.02
18	40	Cathinka Lunder	Norway	48.08	19	46.99	18	1:35.07	+5.25
19	27	Delia Durrer	Switzerland	48.34	21	47.02	19	1:35.36	+5.54
20	41	Sophie Foster	Great Britain	49.29	28	47.76	21	1:37.05	+7.23
21	47	Julia Zlatkova	Bulgaria	49.03	26	48.54	23	1:37.57	+7.75
22	39	Kristiane Rør Madsen	Denmark	51.37	34	46.76	17	1:38.13	+8.31
23	48	Christina Bühler	Liechtenstein	50.77	32	47.96	22	1:38.73	+8.91
24	28	Yuka Wakatsuki	Japan	49.79	29	48.98	25	1:38.77	+8.95
25	38	Maisa Kivimäki	Finland	50.80	33	48.67	24	1:39.47	+9.65
26	46	Esperanza Pereyra	Argentina	50.70	31	49.03	26	1:39.73	+9.91
27	24	Zoe Michael	Australia	49.95	30	51.99	30	1:41.94	+12.12
28	51	Emma Austin	Ireland	51.66	35	50.36	27	1:42.02	+12.20
29	61	Abigail Vieira	Trinidad and Tobago	53.73	36	51.88	29	1:45.61	+15.79
30	54	Maria Nikoleta Kaltsogianni	Greece	54.97	37	54.55	31	1:49.52	+19.70
31	58	Katie Crawford	New Zealand	1:00.56	38	51.50	28	1:52.06	+22.24
32	71	Audrey King	Hong Kong	1:02.12	39	1:00.58	32	2:02.70	+32.88
33	68	Ana Wahleithner	Philippines	1:02.20	40	1:01.67	33	2:03.87	+34.05
34	72	Tamara Popović	Montenegro	1:06.97	42	1:05.30	34	2:12.27	+42.45
35	75	Nichakan Chinupun	Thailand	1:08.30	44	1:08.52	35	2:16.82	+47.00
36	67	Lee Wen-yi	Chinese Taipei	1:11.97	45	1:13.87	36	2:25.84	+56.02
37	73	Hanle van der Merwe	South Africa	1:17.60	47	1:17.48	37	2:35.08	+1:05.26
	1	Sophie Mathiou	Italy	49.07	27	Did not finish			
	4	Emma Resnick	United States	46.97	14	Did not finish			
	12	Dženifera Ģērmane	Latvia	46.32	9	Did not finish			
	13	Amanda Salzgeber	Austria	45.62	4	Did not finish			
	18	Annette Belfrond	Italy	47.08	15	Did not finish			
	25	Amélie Klopfenstein	Switzerland	48.57	24	Did not finish			
	26	Vanina Guerillot	Portugal	48.91	25	Did not finish			
	64	Mina Baştan	Turkey	1:04.04	41	Did not finish			
	74	Valeriya Kovaleva	Uzbekistan	1:07.65	43	Did not finish			
	76	Maria Issa	Lebanon	1:15.13	46	Did not finish			
	5	Caitlin McFarlane	France	Did not finish					
	9	Sarah Brown	Canada	Did not finish					
	16	Anja Oplotnik	Slovenia	Did not finish					
	17	Zita Tóth	Hungary	Did not finish					
	23	Sofia Zitzmann	Germany	Did not finish					
	30	Noa Szollos	Israel	Did not finish					
	31	Jana Suau	Spain	Did not finish					
	34	Daisi Daniels	Great Britain	Did not finish					
	36	Sofía Saint Antonin	Argentina	Did not finish					
	37	Matilde Schwencke	Chile	Did not finish					
	42	Lina Knifič	Slovenia	Did not finish					
	45	Esma Alić	Bosnia and Herzegovina	Did not finish					
	49	Sara Madelene Marøy	Norway	Did not finish					
	50	Zoja Grbović	Serbia	Did not finish					
	52	Lee Hae-un	South Korea	Did not finish					
	53	Adalbjörg Lilly Hauksdóttir	Iceland	Did not finish					
	55	Gabriela Hopek	Poland	Did not finish					
	56	Mia Nuriah Freudweiler	Pakistan	Did not finish					
	57	Smiltė Bieliūnaitė	Lithuania	Did not finish					
	59	Diana Andreea Renţea	Romania	Did not finish					
	60	Isabella Davis	Australia	Did not finish					
	62	Kateryna Shepilenko	Ukraine	Did not finish					
	63	Alexandra Troitskaya	Kazakhstan	Did not finish					
	65	Georgia Epiphaniou	Cyprus	Did not finish					
	66	Sarah Escobar	Ecuador	Did not finish					
	69	Artemis Hoseyni	Iran	Did not finish					
	70	Daniela Payen	Mexico	Did not finish					
	78	Nino Kurtanidze	Georgia	Did not finish					
	10	Alice Marchessault	Canada	Disqualified					
	43	Barbora Nováková	Czech Republic	Did not start					
	77	Era Shala	Kosovo	Did not start					
