= Thailand at the 2020 Winter Youth Olympics =

- IOC code: THA
- NOC: National Olympic Committee of Thailand
- Website: www.olympicthai.org

in Lausanne
- Competitors: 5 in 3 sports
- Medals: Gold 0 Silver 0 Bronze 0 Total 0

Winter Youth Olympics appearances (overview)
- 2020; 2024

Thailand competed with five athletes at the 2020 Winter Youth Olympics in Lausanne, Switzerland from 9 to 22 January 2020.

Thailand made it Winter Youth Olympics debut.

== Alpine skiing ==
Athlete	Event	Run 1		Run 2		Total	
Athlete	Event	Time	Rank	Time	Rank	Time	Rank
Natthawut Hiranrat	Boys' giant slalom	1:21.23	57	1:27.82	53	2:49.05	53
Natthawut Hiranrat	Boys' slalom	1:09.68	52	1:00.29	38	2:09.97	40
Nichakan Chinupun	Girls' giant slalom	1:34.48	57	1:30.90	37	3:05.38	37
Nichakan Chinupun	Girls' slalom	1:08.30	44	1:08.52	35	2:16.82	35

== Cross-country skiing ==
Boys

Athlete	Event	Qualification		Quarterfinal		Semifinal		Final	
Athlete	Event	Time	Rank	Time	Rank	Time	Rank	Time	Rank
Sarawut Koedsin	10 km classic	—N/a						47:37.9	79
Sarawut Koedsin	Free sprint	4:38.79	83	Did not advance					
Sarawut Koedsin	Cross-country cross	6:27.83	85	Did not advance					

Girls

Athlete	Event	Qualification		Quarterfinal		Semifinal		Final	
Athlete	Event	Time	Rank	Time	Rank	Time	Rank	Time	Rank
Duangkamon Hitchana	5 km classic	—N/a						21:52.1	73
Duangkamon Hitchana	Free sprint	3:54.62	79	Did not advance					
Duangkamon Hitchana	Cross-country cross	7:14.66	76	Did not advance					

== Short track speed skating ==
Boys

Athlete	Event	Heats		Quarterfinal		Semifinal		Final	
Athlete	Event	Time	Rank	Time	Rank	Time	Rank	Time	Rank
Natthapat Kancharin	500 m	43.008	2 Q	DNF		Did not advance			15
Natthapat Kancharin	1000 m	1:30.038	2 Q	1:49.235	4	Did not advance			13

== See also ==
- Thailand at the 2020 Summer Olympics
