= Montenegro at the 2020 Winter Youth Olympics =

- IOC code: MNE
- NOC: Montenegrin Olympic Committee
- Website: www.cok.me

in Lausanne
- Competitors: 2 in 2 sports
- Flag bearer: Tamara Popovic
- Medals: Gold 0 Silver 0 Bronze 0 Total 0

Winter Youth Olympics appearances
- 2012; 2016; 2020; 2024

Montenegro competed at the 2020 Winter Youth Olympics in Lausanne, Switzerland from 9 to 22 January 2020.

== Alpine skiing ==
Girls

Athlete	Event	Run 1		Run 2		Total	
Athlete	Event	Time	Rank	Time	Rank	Time	Rank
Tamara Popovic	Giant slalom	1:34.29	55	DSQ			
Tamara Popovic	Slalom	1:06.97	42	1:05.30	34	2:12.27	34

== Cross-country skiing ==
Boys

Athlete	Event	Qualification		Quarterfinal		Semifinal		Final	
Athlete	Event	Time	Rank	Time	Rank	Time	Rank	Time	Rank
Aleksandar Grbovic	10 km classical	—						33:31.6	69
Aleksandar Grbovic	Sprint freestyle	3:50.09	66	did not advance					
Aleksandar Grbovic	Cross-country cross	5:00.74	61	—		did not advance			

== See also ==
- Montenegro at the 2020 Summer Olympics
