= Skeleton at the 2020 Winter Youth Olympics – Boys' =

Boys' skeleton at the III Winter Youth Olympic Games
- Venue: St. Moritz-Celerina Olympic Bobrun
- Dates: 20 January
- Competitors: 20 from 14 nations
- Winning time: 2:17.00

Medalists
1st place, gold medalist(s)		Lukas Nydegger	Germany
2nd place, silver medalist(s)		Elvis Veinbergs	Latvia
3rd place, bronze medalist(s)		Livio Summermatter	Switzerland

The boys' skeleton event at the 2020 Winter Youth Olympics took place on 20 January at the St. Moritz-Celerina Olympic Bobrun.

== Results ==
The first run was held at 14:15 and the second run at 15:30.

Rank	Bib	Athlete	Country	Run 1	Rank 1	Run 2	Rank 2	Total	Behind
1st place, gold medalist(s)	13	Lukas Nydegger	Germany	1:08.59	1	1:08.41	1	2:17.00	
2nd place, silver medalist(s)	12	Elvis Veinbergs	Latvia	1:09.33	2	1:09.09	2	2:18.42	+1.42
3rd place, bronze medalist(s)	4	Livio Summermatter	Switzerland	1:09.90	3	1:09.63	4	2:19.53	+2.53
4	20	Sandro Mai	Austria	1:10.41	7	1:09.45	3	2:19.86	+2.86
5	11	Takanobu Usui	Japan	1:10.29	5	1:09.67	5	2:19.96	+2.96
6	15	Dmitrii Grevtsev	Russia	1:10.27	4	1:10.25	6	2:20.52	+3.52
7	18	Lee Seo-hyuk	South Korea	1:10.37	6	1:10.68	9	2:21.05	+4.05
8	14	Timm Beiwinkler	Germany	1:10.73	9	1:10.40	7	2:21.13	+4.13
9	16	Rasmus Johansen	Denmark	1:10.57	8	1:10.95	13	2:21.52	+4.52
10	3	Colin Freeling	Belgium	1:11.06	12	1:10.49	8	2:21.55	+4.55
11	19	Christian Jünemann	Austria	1:10.75	10	1:10.81	10	2:21.56	+4.56
12	6	Lars Rumo	Switzerland	1:11.01	11	1:10.81	10	2:21.82	+4.82
13	8	Dmitry Knysh	Russia	1:11.72	15	1:11.05	14	2:22.77	+5.77
14	2	Ryan Kuehn	Canada	1:11.55	14	1:11.65	15	2:23.20	+6.20
14	1	Timon Drahoňovský	Czech Republic	1:11.47	13	1:11.73	16	2:23.20	+6.20
16	10	James McGuire	United States	1:12.40	16	1:10.91	12	2:23.31	+6.31
17	7	Yang Po-wei	Chinese Taipei	1:13.58	18	1:12.79	17	2:26.37	+9.37
18	9	Teddy Fitzsimons	United States	1:14.32	19	1:13.75	18	2:28.07	+11.07
19	5	Taido Nagao	Japan	1:13.13	17	1:17.35	19	2:30.48	+13.48
20	17	Lucas Carvalho	Brazil	1:21.62	20	1:24.89	20	2:46.51	+29.51
