= Edvin Anger =

Swedish cross-country skier (born 2002)

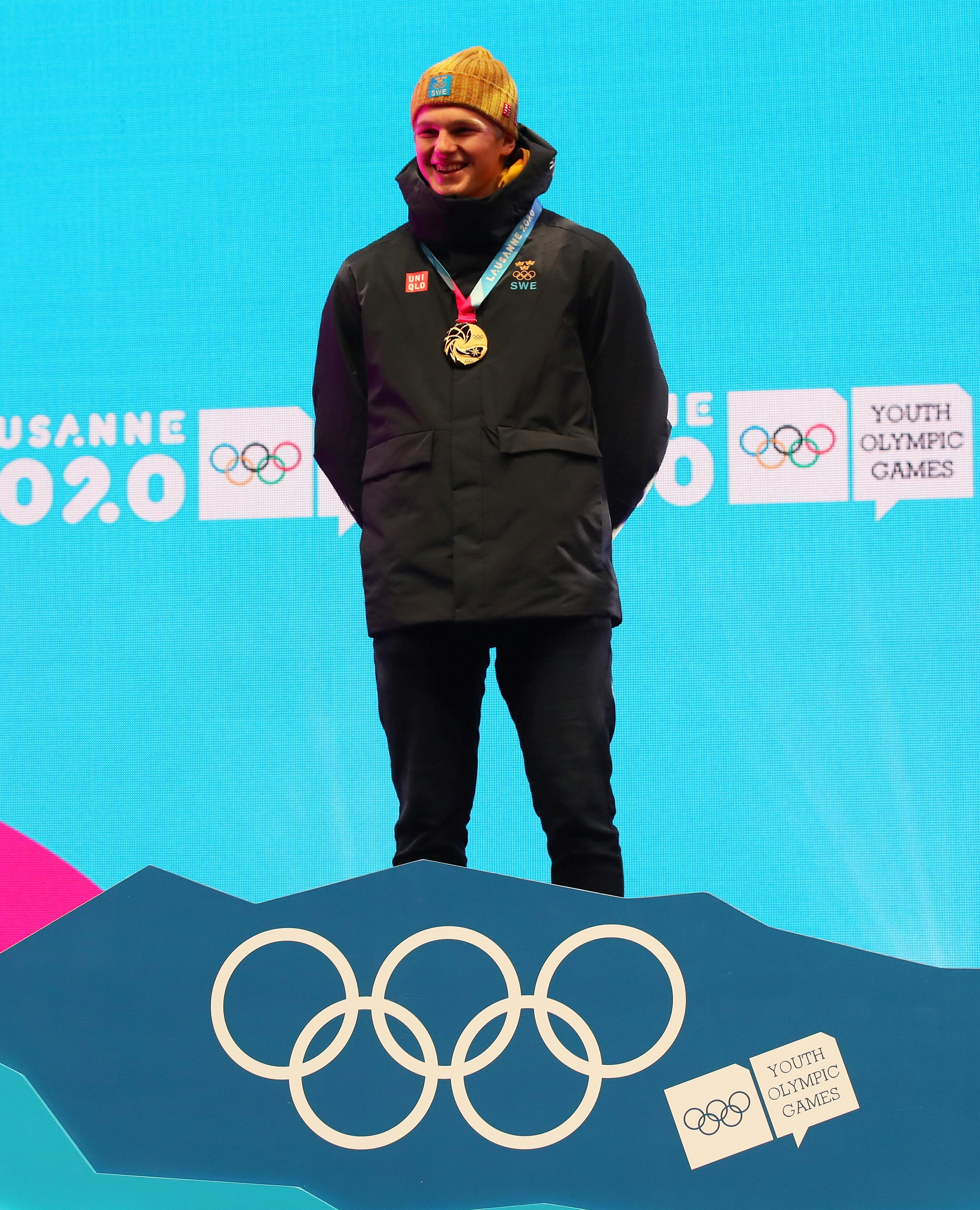
- Anger in January 2020

Personal information
- Nationality: Sweden
- Born: 8 April 2002 (age 24) Hedemora, Sweden
- Height: 1.93 m (6 ft 4 in)

Sport
- Sport: Skiing
- Club: Åsarna IK

World Cup career
- Seasons: 3 – (2023–present)
- Indiv. starts: 76
- Indiv. podiums: 6
- Indiv. wins: 1
- Team starts: 10
- Team podiums: 6
- Team wins: 2
- Overall titles: 0 – (2nd in 2025)
- Discipline titles: 0
Medal record
Men's cross-country skiing
Representing Sweden
World Championships
Bronze medal – third place	2025 Trondheim	Team sprint
Bronze medal – third place	2025 Trondheim	4 × 7,5 km relay
Winter Youth Olympics
Gold medal – first place	2020 Lausanne	Individual sprint
Silver medal – second place	2020 Lausanne	Cross-country cross
- Updated on 30 November 2025

Edvin Frederik Anger (born 8 April 2002) is a Swedish cross-country skier who has been competing in the FIS World Cup since 2022. He participated in the 2023 World Championships in Planica, Slovenia. He won his first individual World Cup race in January 2025 in a classic sprint race held in Les Rousses, France.

== Cross-country skiing results ==
All results are sourced from the International Ski Federation (FIS).

=== Olympic Games ===
Year	Age	10 km individual	20 km skiathlon	50 km mass start	Sprint	4 × 7.5 km relay	Team sprint
2026	23	42	37	—	20	10	10

=== World Championships ===
- 2 medals (2 bronze)

Year	Age	10/15 km individual	20/30 km skiathlon	50 km mass start	Sprint	4 × 7.5/10 km relay	Team sprint
2023	20	50	—	—	29	—	5
2025	22	4	14	—	11	Bronze	Bronze

=== World Cup ===
==== Season standings ====
Season	Age	Discipline standings				Ski Tour standings
Season	Age	Overall	Distance	Sprint	U23	Tour de Ski
2023	20	15	57	5	3rd place, bronze medalist(s)	—
2024	21	17	43	8	1st place, gold medalist(s)	39
2025	22	2nd place, silver medalist(s)	13	3rd place, bronze medalist(s)	1st place, gold medalist(s)	9
2026	23	3	3	23	—	—

==== Individual podiums ====
- 1 victory – (1 WC, 0 SWC)
- 7 podiums – (4 WC, 3 SWC)

No.	Season	Date	Location	Race	Level	Place
1	2023–24	3 January 2024	Davos, Switzerland	1.2 km Sprint F	Stage World Cup	2nd
2	2023–24	10 February 2024	Canmore, Canada	1.3 km Sprint F	World Cup	3rd
3	2024–25	1 January 2025	Toblach, Italy	15 km Pursuit C	Stage World Cup	2nd
4	2024–25	18 January 2025	Les Rousses, France	1.3 km Sprint C	World Cup	1st
5	2024–25	25 January 2025	Engadin, Switzerland	1.3 km Sprint F	World Cup	2nd
6	2025–26	30 November 2025	Rukatunturi, Finland	20 km Mass Start F	World Cup	3rd
7	2025–26	1 January 2026	Toblach, Italy	20 km Pursuit C	Stage World Cup	3rd

==== Team podiums ====
- 2 victories – (2 RL)
- 5 podiums – (5 RL)

No.	Season	Date	Location	Race	Level	Place	Teammate(s)
1	2022–23	5 February 2023	Toblach, Italy	4 × 7.5 km Relay C/F	World Cup	2nd	Rosjö / Halfvarsson / Häggström
2	2022–23	19 March 2023	Falun, Sweden	4 × 5 km Mixed Relay C/F	World Cup	1st	Halfvarsson / Ilar / Sundling
3	2023–24	3 December 2023	Gällivare, Sweden	4 × 7.5 km Relay C/F	World Cup	2nd	Häggström / Halfvarsson / Johansson
4	2023–24	26 January 2024	Goms, Switzerland	4 × 5 km Mixed Relay C/F	World Cup	2nd	Häggström / Andersson / Dahlqvist
5	2024–25	24 January 2025	Engadin, Switzerland	4 × 5 km Mixed Relay C/F	World Cup	1st	Burman / Ribom / Ilar
