= Germany at the 2020 Winter Youth Olympics =

- IOC code: GER
- NOC: Deutscher Olympischer Sportbund
- Website: www.dosb.de

in Lausanne
- Competitors: 90 in 16 sports
- Medals Ranked 6th: Gold 5 Silver 7 Bronze 6 Total 18

Winter Youth Olympics appearances
- 2012; 2016; 2020; 2024

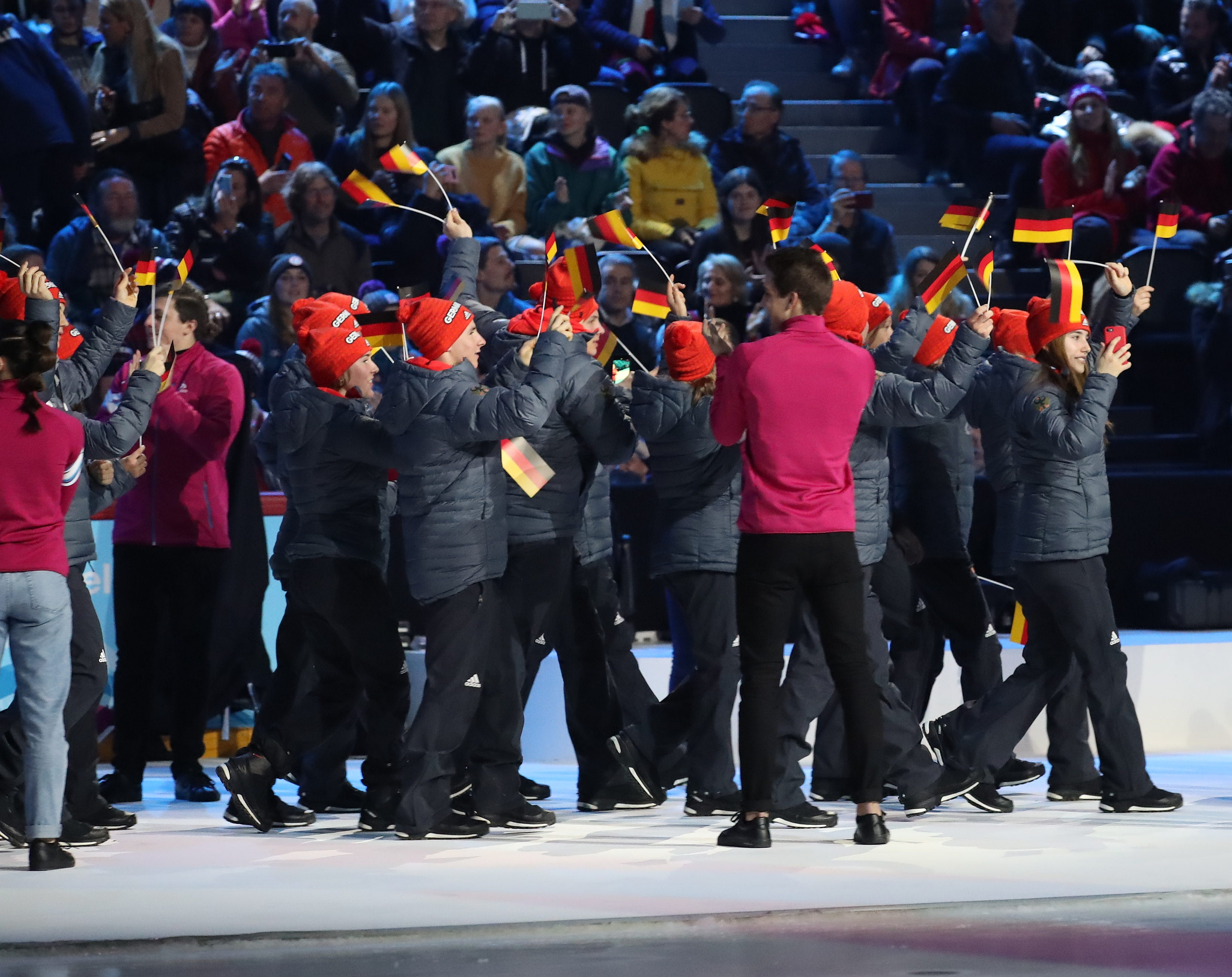
Opening ceremony.

Germany competed at the 2020 Winter Youth Olympics in Lausanne, Switzerland from 9 to 22 January 2020. Germany competed with 90 athletes across 16 sports.

== Medalists ==
Medals awarded to participants of mixed-NOC teams are represented in italics. These medals are not counted towards the individual NOC medal tally.

Medal	Name	Sport	Event	Date
Gold	Leonie Böttcher	Ice hockey	Girls' 3x3 mixed tournament	15 January
Gold	Merle Fräbel	Luge	Girls' singles	17 January
Gold	Moritz Jäger; Valentin Steudte	Luge	Boys' doubles	17 January
Gold	Jessica Degenhardt; Vanessa Schneider	Luge	Girls' doubles	18 January
Gold	Alexander Czudaj	Bobsleigh	Boys' monobob	20 January
Gold	Lukas Nydegger	Skeleton	Boys'	20 January
Silver	Lara Klein; Max Geissler-Hauber	Alpine skiing	Parallel mixed team	15 January
Silver	Matthias Bittner	Ice hockey	Boys' 3x3 mixed tournament	15 January
Silver	Jessica Degenhardt	Luge	Girls' singles	17 January
Silver	Josefa Schellmoser	Skeleton	Girls'	19 January
Silver	Merle Fräbel; Timon Grancagnolo; Moritz Jäger; Valentin Steudte	Luge	Mixed team relay	20 January
Silver	Niels Conradt	Snowboarding	Boys' snowboard cross	20 January
Silver	Elias Keck	Cross-country skiing	Boys' 10 kilometres classic	21 January
Silver	Annika Morgan	Snowboarding	Girls' big air	22 January
Bronze	Lara Klein	Alpine skiing	Girls' slalom	14 January
Bronze	Marlon D'Acunto	Ice hockey	Boys' 3x3 mixed tournament	15 January
Bronze	Maya Stöber	Ice hockey	Girls' 3x3 mixed tournament	15 January
Bronze	Timon Grancagnolo	Luge	Boys' singles	18 January
Bronze	Jenny Nowak	Nordic combined	Girls' normal hill individual/4 km	18 January
Bronze	Céline Harms	Bobsleigh	Girls' monobob	19 January
Bronze	Sissi Schrödl	Skeleton	Girls'	19 January
Bronze	Lilith Kuhnert; Nina Walderbach; Sebastian Veit; Niels Conradt	Snowboarding	Team snowboard ski cross	21 January

== Alpine skiing ==
Boys

Athlete	Event	Run 1		Run 2		Total	
Athlete	Event	Time	Rank	Time	Rank	Time	Rank
Max Geissler-Hauber	Super-G	—N/a				55.83	18
Max Geissler-Hauber	Combined	55.83	18	34.17	8	1:30.00	9
Max Geissler-Hauber	Giant slalom	DNF					
Max Geissler-Hauber	Slalom	38.07	10	40.31	6	1:18.38	9
Marinus Sennhofer	Super-G	—N/a				55.40	12
Marinus Sennhofer	Combined	55.40	12	DNF			
Marinus Sennhofer	Giant slalom	1:05.05	12	1:05.07	8	2:10.12	10
Marinus Sennhofer	Slalom	37.88	7	40.20	5	1:18.08	7

Girls

Athlete	Event	Run 1		Run 2		Total	
Athlete	Event	Time	Rank	Time	Rank	Time	Rank
Katharina Haas	Super-G	—N/a				57.91	21
Katharina Haas	Combined	57.91	21	37.42	3	1:35.33	8
Katharina Haas	Giant slalom	1:05.50	4	DNF			
Lara Sophie Klein	Super-G	—N/a				57.97	22
Lara Sophie Klein	Combined	57.97	22	38.42	11	1:36.39	13
Lara Sophie Klein	Giant slalom	DNF					
Lara Sophie Klein	Slalom	45.63	5	44.62	5	1:30.25	3rd place, bronze medalist(s)
Sophia Zitzmann	Slalom	DNF					

Mixed

Athlete	Event	Round of 16	Quarterfinals	Semifinals	Final / BM	
Athlete	Event	Opposition Result	Opposition Result	Opposition Result	Opposition Result	Rank
Lara Klein; Max Geissler-Hauber	Team	Slovenia; W 3–1	Switzerland; W 2*–2	Austria; W 3–1	Finland; L 0–4	2nd place, silver medalist(s)

== Biathlon ==
Boys

Athlete	Event	Time	Misses	Rank
Elias Asal	Sprint	21:23.8	4 (3+1)	25
Elias Asal	Individual	35:05.8	2 (1+0+0+1)	4
Dorian Endler	Sprint	23:14.4	7 (3+4)	63
Dorian Endler	Individual	41:00.4	8 (4+3+0+1)	58
Florian Stasswender	Sprint	21:22.2	3 (0+3)	24
Florian Stasswender	Individual	38:11.1	4 (1+1+0+2)	27
Franz Schaser	Sprint	20:57.2	2 (1+1)	21
Franz Schaser	Individual	41:31.7	9 (3+3+0+3)	66

Girls

Athlete	Event	Time	Misses	Rank
Marlene Fichtner	Sprint	19:56.5	1 (0+1)	16
Marlene Fichtner	Individual	37:08.4	4 (0+3+1+0)	25
Nathalie Horstmann	Sprint	22:13.7	5 (3+2)	66
Nathalie Horstmann	Individual	39:09.6	7 (1+3+0+3)	49
Johanna Puff	Sprint	19:08.3	1 (1+0)	4
Johanna Puff	Individual	34:14.7	2 (1+0+0+1)	5
Hannah Schlickum	Sprint	21:16.4	2 (0+2)	49
Hannah Schlickum	Individual	37:26.8	4 (0+2+1+1)	28

Mixed

Athletes	Event	Time	Misses	Rank
Johanna Puff; Elias Asal	Single mixed relay	43:47.7	2+15	9
Johanna Puff; Marlene Fichtner; Franz Schaser; Elias Asal	Mixed relay	1:14:43.9	4+10	7

== Bobsleigh ==
Athlete	Event	Run 1		Run 2		Total	
Athlete	Event	Time	Rank	Time	Rank	Time	Rank
Alexander Czudaj	Boys'	1:12.43	1	1:12.37	5	2:24.80	1st place, gold medalist(s)
Celine Harms	Girls'	1:13.68	2	1:13.68	3	2:27.36	3rd place, bronze medalist(s)
Maja Michelle Wagner	Girls'	1:13.87	4	1:13.80	4	2:27.67	4

== Cross-country skiing ==
Boys

Athlete	Event	Qualification		Quarterfinal		Semifinal		Final	
Athlete	Event	Time	Rank	Time	Rank	Time	Rank	Time	Rank
Simon Jung	10 km classic	—N/a						28:19.1	16
Simon Jung	Free sprint	3:24.90	24 Q	3:28.90	6	Did not advance			
Simon Jung	Cross-country cross	4:25.12	12 Q	—N/a		4:29.99	7	Did not advance	
Marius Kastner	10 km classic	—N/a						28:43.8	22
Marius Kastner	Free sprint	3:19.51	10 Q	3:25.70	3	Did not advance			
Marius Kastner	Cross-country cross	4:18.77	4 Q	—N/a		4:28.01	6	Did not advance	
Elias Keck	10 km classic	—N/a						27:25.5	2nd place, silver medalist(s)
Elias Keck	Free sprint	3:21.78	14 Q	3:23.51	2 Q	3:16.44	5	Did not advance	
Elias Keck	Cross-country cross	4:23.00	7 Q	—N/a		4:20.59	4	Did not advance	

Girls

Athlete	Event	Qualification		Quarterfinal		Semifinal		Final	
Athlete	Event	Time	Rank	Time	Rank	Time	Rank	Time	Rank
Lara Dellit	5 km classic	—N/a						15:44.8	22
Lara Dellit	Free sprint	2:47.48	4 Q	2:46.44	1 Q	2:49.09	3 LL	2:53.13	4
Lara Dellit	Cross-country cross	5:09.90	15 Q	—N/a		5:01.79	4 LL	5:03.32	9
Helen Hoffmann	5 km classic	—N/a						14:59.5	10
Helen Hoffmann	Free sprint	2:51.31	14 Q	2:47.89	2 Q	2:49.55	5	Did not advance	
Helen Hoffmann	Cross-country cross	4:58.42	6 Q	—N/a		4:55.26	3 LL	4:56.64	8
Germana Thannheimer	5 km classic	—N/a						14:52.9	6
Germana Thannheimer	Free sprint	2:56.13	25 Q	2:51.23	2 Q	2:51.86	5	Did not advance	
Germana Thannheimer	Cross-country cross	5:05.45	10 Q	—N/a		4:57.95	3 LL	5:19.42	10

== Curling ==
Germany qualified a mixed team of four athletes.

Mixed team

Team	Event	Group stage						Quarterfinal	Semifinal	Final / BM	
Team	Event	Opposition Score	Opposition Score	Opposition Score	Opposition Score	Opposition Score	Rank	Opposition Score	Opposition Score	Opposition Score	Rank
Benjamin Kapp; Kim Sutor; Johannes Scheuerl; Zoé Antes	Mixed team	Brazil; W 15–1	Denmark; W 8–4	Switzerland; L 2–7	China; W 7–6	Hungary; W 8–6	2 Q	New Zealand; L 4–7	Did not advance		8

Mixed doubles

Athletes	Event	Round of 48	Round of 24	Round of 12	Round of 6	Semifinals	Final / BM	
Athletes	Event	Opposition Result	Opposition Result	Opposition Result	Opposition Result	Opposition Result	Opposition Result	Rank
Zoé Antes (GER); Kristóf Szarvas (HUN)	Mixed doubles	Rogic (BRA) / Nakahara (JPN); W 9–2	Beitone (FRA) / Lysakov (RUS); L 2–8	Did not advance				
Sara Rigler (SLO); Benjamin Kapp (GER)	Mixed doubles	Mitchell (GBR) / Jiral (CZE); L 5–8	Did not advance					
Carmen Perez Ara (ESP); Johannes Scheuerl (GER)	Mixed doubles	Hallström (SWE) / Szmidt (POL); L 9–10	Did not advance					
Kim Sutor (GER); Charlie Thompson (USA)	Mixed doubles	Vergnaud (FRA) / Burås (NOR); L 5–7	Did not advance					

== Figure skating ==
Couples

Athletes	Event	SP/SD		FS/FD		Total	
Athletes	Event	Points	Rank	Points	Rank	Points	Rank
Letizia Roscher; Luis Schuster	Pairs	42.80	8	80.25	8	123.05	8

Mixed NOC team trophy

Athletes	Event	Free skate/Free dance					
Athletes	Event	Ice dance	Pairs	Girls	Boys	Total	
Athletes	Event	Points Team points	Points Team points	Points Team points	Points Team points	Points	Rank
Team Hope; Miku Makita / Tyler Gunara (CAN); Letizia Roscher / Luis Schuster (GER); Maïa Mazzara (FRA); Liam Kapeikis (USA)	Team trophy	89.87; 4	78.24; 1	103.36; 5	117.28; 5	15	8

== Freestyle skiing ==
Ski cross

Athlete	Event	Group heats		Semifinal	Final
Athlete	Event	Points	Rank	Position	Position
Kilian Himmelsbach	Boys' ski cross	16	5	Did not advance	
Sebastian Veit	Boys' ski cross	20	1 Q	4 SF	5
Nina Walderbach	Girls' ski cross	15	5	Did not advance	

Slopestyle & Big Air

Athlete	Event	Qualification				Final				
Athlete	Event	Run 1	Run 2	Best	Rank	Run 1	Run 2	Run 3	Best	Rank
David Zehentner	Boys' big air	73.50	50.50	73.50	12 Q	64.00	70.00	78.00	148.00	7
David Zehentner	Boys' slopestyle	64.33	9.66	64.33	11 Q	48.33	17.66	35.00	48.33	12

== Ice hockey ==
=== Girls' tournament ===
Summary

Key:
- OT – Overtime
- GWS – Match decided by penalty-shootout

Team	Event	Group stage			Semifinal	Final	
Team	Event	Opposition Score	Opposition Score	Rank	Opposition Score	Opposition Score	Rank
Germany girls'	Girls' tournament	Sweden; L 2–7	Slovakia; L 1–2	3	Did not advance		

Team roster

- Leonie Böttcher
- Kim Bürge
- Liliane Gottfried
- Katharina Häckelsmiller
- Renee Heyer
- Chanel Hofverberg
- Julia Kohberg
- Lola Liang
- Felicity Luby
- Celine Mayer
- Charlott Schaffrath
- Leni Schmidt
- Chiara Schultes
- Maya Stöber
- Lily Teister
- Sofia Thierolf
- Svenja Voigt

=== Mixed NOC 3x3 tournament ===
Nominated athletes

- Daniel Assavolyuk
- Matthias Bittner
- Leonie Böttcher
- Marlon D'Acunto
- Chanel Hofverberg
- Roman Kechter
- Felicity Luby
- Celine Mayer
- Maya Stöber

== Luge ==
Boys

Athlete	Event	Run 1		Run 2		Total	
Athlete	Event	Time	Rank	Time	Rank	Time	Rank
Timon Grancagnolo	Singles	54.433	3	54.403	3	1:48.836	3rd place, bronze medalist(s)
Pascal Kunze	Singles	54.519	5	54.442	4	1:48.961	4
Moritz Jäger; Valentin Steudte	Doubles	54.824	1	54.825	2	1:49.649	1st place, gold medalist(s)

Girls

Athlete	Event	Run 1		Run 2		Total	
Athlete	Event	Time	Rank	Time	Rank	Time	Rank
Jessica Degenhardt	Singles	55.171	3	54.724	2	1:49.895	2nd place, silver medalist(s)
Merle Fräbel	Singles	55.011	1	54.676	1	1:49.687	1st place, gold medalist(s)
Jessica Degenhardt; Vanessa Schneider	Doubles	55.748	1	55.695	1	1:51.443	1st place, gold medalist(s)

Mixed team relay

Athlete	Event	Girls' singles		Boys' singles		Doubles		Total	
Athlete	Event	Time	Rank	Time	Rank	Time	Rank	Time	Rank
Merle Fräbel; Timon Grancagnolo; Moritz Jäger; Valentin Steudte	Team relay	56.598	1	58.812	3	59.212	2	2:54.622	2nd place, silver medalist(s)

== Nordic combined ==
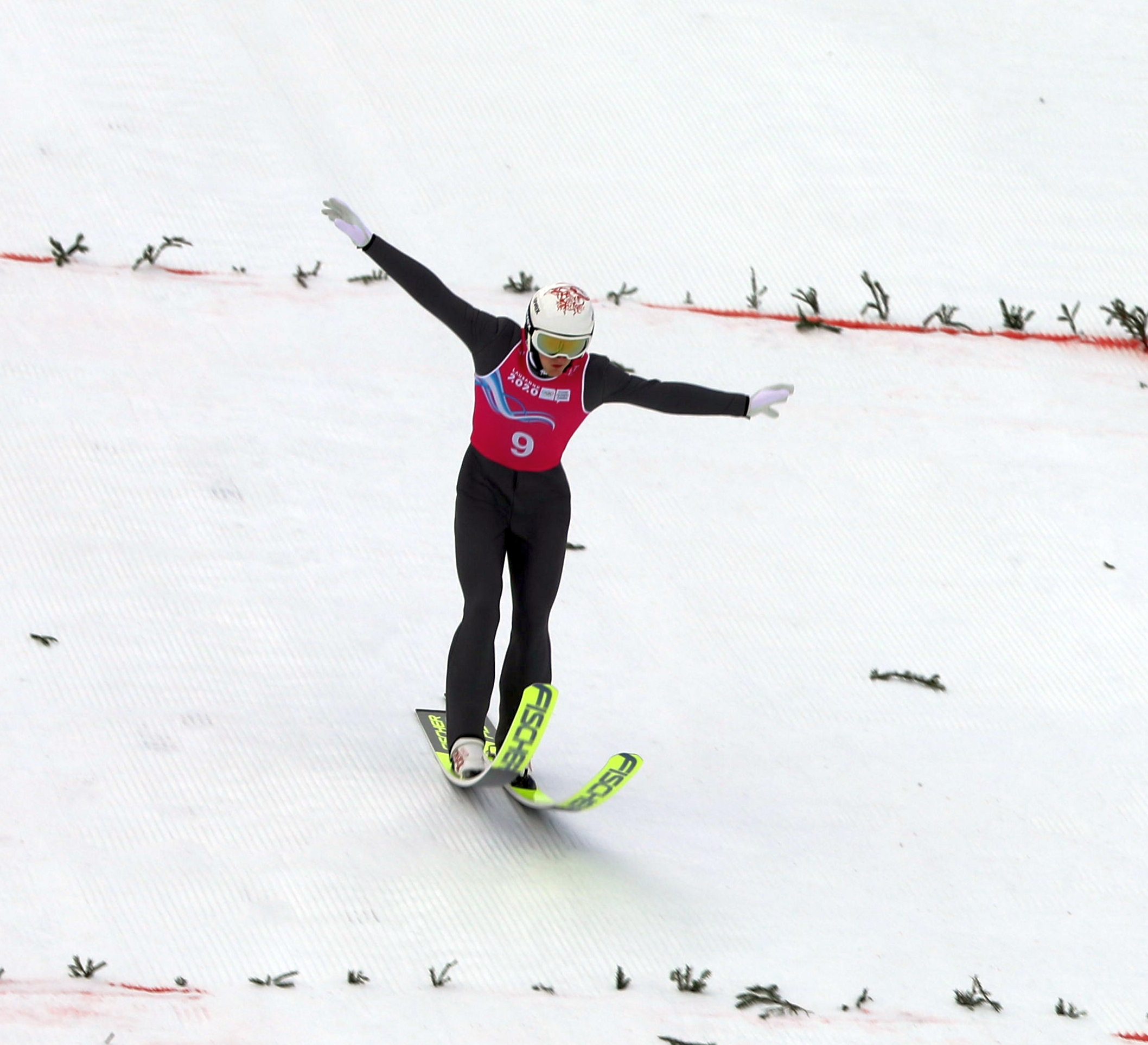
Jan Andersen lands his jump at the Boys' normal hill individual

Individual

Athlete	Event	Ski jumping				Cross-country	
Athlete	Event	Distance	Points	Rank	Deficit	Time	Rank
Jan Andersen	Normal hill/6 km	89.0	116.7	4	0:16	15:38.9	7
Lenard Kersting	Normal hill/6 km	80.5	102.7	16	1:12	15:59.7	10
Emilia Görlich	Normal hill/4 km	77.5	107.6	9	0:57	12:13.1	5
Jenny Nowak	Normal hill/4 km	84.0	123.4	2	0:10	11:50.3	3rd place, bronze medalist(s)

Nordic mixed team

Athlete	Event	Ski jumping			Cross-country	
Athlete	Event	Points	Rank	Deficit	Time	Rank
Emilia Görlich; Lenard Kersting; Anna Jäkle; Finn Braun; Lara Dellit; Elias Keck	Nordic mixed team	313.7	10	3:49	32:58.8	7

== Short track speed skating ==
Two German skaters achieved quota places for Germany based on the results of the 2019 World Junior Short Track Speed Skating Championships.

Boys

Athlete	Event	Heats		Quarterfinal		Semifinal		Final	
Athlete	Event	Time	Rank	Time	Rank	Time	Rank	Time	Rank
Till Schäfer	500 m	44.292	4	Did not advance					
Till Schäfer	1000 m	1:37.232	4	Did not advance					

Girls

Athlete	Event	Heats		Quarterfinal		Semifinal		Final	
Athlete	Event	Time	Rank	Time	Rank	Time	Rank	Time	Rank
Betty Moeske	500 m	46.134	3	Did not advance					
Betty Moeske	1000 m	1:58.705	4	Did not advance					

== Skeleton ==
Athlete	Event	Run 1		Run 2		Total	
Athlete	Event	Time	Rank	Time	Rank	Time	Rank
Timm Beiwinkler	Boys'	1:10.73	9	1:10.40	7	2:21.13	8
Lukas Nydegger	Boys'	1:08.59	1	1:08.41	1	2:17.00	1st place, gold medalist(s)
Nele Kaschinski	Girls'	1:12.66	10	1:12.59	10	2:25.25	10
Josefa Schellmoser	Girls'	1:11.04	1	1:11.49	3	2:22.53	2nd place, silver medalist(s)
Sissi Schrödl	Girls'	1:11.31	3	1:11.64	4	2:22.95	3rd place, bronze medalist(s)

== Ski jumping ==
Boys

Athlete	Event	First round			Final			Total	
Athlete	Event	Distance	Points	Rank	Distance	Points	Rank	Points	Rank
Finn Braun	Normal hill	70.0	98.8	21	80.0	103.3	15	202.1	17
Luca Geyer	Normal hill	83.0	101.4	19	84.0	110.9	9	212.3	13

Girls

Athlete	Event	First round			Final			Total	
Athlete	Event	Distance	Points	Rank	Distance	Points	Rank	Points	Rank
Michelle Göbel	Normal hill	73.5	98.1	10	70.5	79.5	16	177.6	13
Anna Jäkle	Normal hill	74.0	95.2	14	73.5	84.5	11	179.7	12

Mixed

Athlete	Event	First round			Final			Total	
Athlete	Event	Distance	Points	Rank	Distance	Points	Rank	Points	Rank
Jenny Nowak; Jan Andersen; Michelle Göbel; Luca Geyer	Mixed Team	249.5	363.1	9	328.0	460.7	3	823.8	6

== Ski mountaineering ==
Individual

Athlete	Event	Time	Rank
Franz Eder	Boys' individual	58:19.32	19
Finn Hösch	Boys' individual	51:48.48	9
Antonia Niedermaier	Girls' individual	1:02:47.57	6
Sophia Wessling	Girls' individual	1:06:21.10	10

Sprint

Athlete	Event	Qualification		Quarterfinal		Semifinal		Final	
Athlete	Event	Time	Rank	Time	Rank	Time	Rank	Time	Rank
Franz Eder	Boys' sprint	3:15.77	19	3:05.72	5	Did not advance			
Finn Hösch	Boys' sprint	3:03.58	11	2:44.61	2 Q	2:46.43	4	Did not advance	
Antonia Niedermaier	Girls' sprint	3:53.60	13	3:58.41	5	Did not advance			
Sophia Wessling	Girls' sprint	3:50.55	11	3:35.91	2 Q	3:30.61	4	Did not advance	

Mixed

Athlete	Event	Time	Rank
Antonia Niedermaier; Franz Eder; Sophie Wessling; Finn Hösch	Mixed relay	39:04	5

== Snowboarding ==
Snowboard cross

Athlete	Event	Group heats		Semifinal	Final
Athlete	Event	Points	Rank	Position	Position
Niels Conradt	Boys' snowboard cross	18	2 Q	2 BF	2nd place, silver medalist(s)
Lilith Kuhnert	Girls' snowboard cross	17	3 Q	4 SF	8
Celia Trinkl	Girls' snowboard cross	12	9	Did not advance	

Athlete	Event	Pre-Heats	Quarterfinals	Semifinal	Final
Athlete	Event	Position	Position	Position	Position
Lilith Kuhnert; Nina Walderbach; Niels Conradt; Sebastian Veit	Team snowboard ski cross	Bye	2 Q	1 BF	3rd place, bronze medalist(s)
Mixed Team 1 Lia Nilsson (SWE); Chloé Passerat (FRA); Kilian Himmelsbach (GER); Ivan Malobannyi (UKR)	Team snowboard ski cross	Bye	1 Q	4 SF	5

Halfpipe, Slopestyle, & Big Air

Athlete	Event	Qualification				Final				
Athlete	Event	Run 1	Run 2	Best	Rank	Run 1	Run 2	Run 3	Best	Rank
Leopold Frey	Boys' big air	11.00	30.50	30.50	17	Did not advance				
Leopold Frey	Boys' slopestyle	51.00	7.66	51.00	11 Q	41.66	16.00	40.00	41.66	6
Mark Schrott	Boys' halfpipe	52.66	46.00	52.66	12	Did not advance				
Till Strohmeyer	Boys' big air	70.50	16.75	70.50	9 Q	18.50	8.00	14.75	18.50	11
Till Strohmeyer	Boys' slopestyle	10.00	4.00	10.00	21	Did not advance				
Marie Hahnl	Girls' big air	29.66	12.33	29.66	15	Did not advance				
Annika Morgan	Girls' big air	89.00	DNS	89.00	1 Q	86.75	18.00	73.75	160.50	2nd place, silver medalist(s)
Annika Morgan	Girls' slopestyle	DNS								

== Speed skating ==
Boys

Athlete	Event	Time	Rank
Felix Motschmann	500 m	38.51	14
Felix Motschmann	1500 m	2:01.53	16
Manuel Zähringer	500 m	39.34	22
Manuel Zähringer	1500 m	2:01.87	18

Girls

Athlete	Event	Time	Rank
Anna Ostlender	500 m	41.63	6
Anna Ostlender	1500 m	2:19.58	18
Victoria Stirnemann	500 m	41.80	8
Victoria Stirnemann	1500 m	2:11.36	4

Mass Start

Athlete	Event	Semifinal			Final		
Athlete	Event	Points	Time	Rank	Points	Time	Rank
Felix Motschmann	Boys' mass start	2	6:33.95	8 Q	4	6:49.35	6
Manuel Zähringer	Boys' mass start	0	5:57.12	12	Did not advance		
Anna Ostlender	Girls' mass start	3	6:15.42	6 Q	1	6:52.12	8
Victoria Stirnemann	Girls' mass start	3	6:52.86	7 Q	0	6:53.08	11

Mixed

Athlete	Event	Time	Rank
Team 1 Kateřina Macháčková (CZE); Isabel Grevelt (NED); Max Fiodarav (BLR); Felix Motschmann (GER)	Mixed team sprint	2:08.16	9
Team 2 Zuzana Kuršová (CZE); Wang Jingyi (CHN); Manuel Zähringer (GER); Andrei Herman (BLR)	Mixed team sprint	2:09.32	11
Team 6 Julie Berg Sjøbrend (NOR); Anna Ostlender (GER); Jakub Kočí (CZE); Sebas Diniz (NED)	Mixed team sprint	Disqualified	
Team 8 Darya Gavrilova (KAZ); Victoria Stirnemann (GER); Flavio Gross (SUI); Sun Jiazhao (CHN)	Mixed team sprint	2:07.71	8

== See also ==
- Germany at the 2020 Summer Olympics
