= Australia at the 2020 Winter Youth Olympics =

- IOC code: AUS
- NOC: Australian Olympic Committee
- Website: www.olympics.com.au

in Lausanne
- Competitors: 33 in 7 sports
- Medals: Gold 1 Silver 0 Bronze 0 Total 1

Winter Youth Olympics appearances
- 2012; 2016; 2020; 2024

Australia competed at the 2020 Winter Youth Olympics in Lausanne, Switzerland from 9 to 22 January 2020.

== Medalists ==
Medals awarded to participants of mixed-NOC teams are represented in italics. These medals are not counted towards the individual NOC medal tally.

Medal	Name	Sport	Event	Date
Gold	Josie Baff	Snowboarding	Girls' snowboard cross	20 January
Silver	Courtney Mahoney	Ice hockey	Girls' 3x3 mixed tournament	15 January
Bronze	Sai Lake	Ice hockey	Boys' 3x3 mixed tournament	15 January
Bronze	Nikki Sharp	Ice hockey	Girls' 3x3 mixed tournament	15 January

== Alpine skiing ==
Boys

Athlete	Event	Run 1		Run 2		Total	
Athlete	Event	Time	Rank	Time	Rank	Time	Rank
Thomas Hoffman	Super-G	—N/a				56.05	23
Thomas Hoffman	Combined	56.05	23	DNF			
Thomas Hoffman	Giant slalom	DSQ					
Thomas Hoffman	Slalom						
Joey Steggall	Super-G	—N/a				59.38	47
Joey Steggall	Combined	59.38	47	DNF			
Joey Steggall	Giant slalom	1:09.09	35	1:10.48	34	2:19.57	34
Joey Steggall	Slalom						

Girls

Athlete	Event	Run 1		Run 2		Total	
Athlete	Event	Time	Rank	Time	Rank	Time	Rank
Isabella Davis	Super-G	—N/a				1:05.52	48
Isabella Davis	Combined	1:05.52	48	DNF			
Isabella Davis	Giant slalom	DNF					
Isabella Davis	Slalom						
Zoe Michael	Super-G	—N/a				1:03.02	43
Zoe Michael	Combined	1:03.02	43	DNF			
Zoe Michael	Giant slalom	1:11.03	37	1:08.76	24	2:19.79	25
Zoe Michael	Slalom						

== Biathlon ==
Boys

Athlete	Event	Time	Misses	Rank
Christian Mahon	Sprint	25:30.5	4 (2+2)	89
Christian Mahon	Individual	42:30.4	4 (0+2+1+1)	73
David Patterson	Sprint	27:09.5	5 (1+4)	94
David Patterson	Individual	49:25.1	9 (2+2+2+3)	94
Jonte Treasure	Sprint	29:25.0	7 (4+3)	96
Jonte Treasure	Individual	54:15.6	13 (3+3+3+4)	98

Girls

Athlete	Event	Time	Misses	Rank
Luka Miskin	Sprint	21:17.3	1 (0+1)	50
Luka Miskin	Individual	39:06.5	5 (0+2+0+3)	47
Chelsey Johnson	Sprint	23:09.5	0 (0+0)	74
Chelsey Johnson	Individual	40:33.6	2 (0+2+0+0)	60
Isabella Moon	Sprint	23:28.5	6 (4+2)	77
Isabella Moon	Individual	43:30.2	10 (3+5+0+2)	76

Mixed

Athletes	Event	Time	Misses	Rank
Luka Miskin; Christian Mahon	Single mixed relay	50:52.6	4+14	26
Isabella Moon; Chelsey Johnson; Christian Mahon; David Patterson	Mixed relay	1:27:21.3	2+11	23

== Cross-country skiing ==
Boys

Athlete	Event	Qualification		Quarterfinal		Semifinal		Final	
Athlete	Event	Time	Rank	Time	Rank	Time	Rank	Time	Rank
Hugo Hinckfuss	10 km classic	—N/a							
Hugo Hinckfuss	Free sprint								
Hugo Hinckfuss	Cross-country cross	4:48.74	52	Did not advance					
John Mordes	10 km classic	—N/a							
John Mordes	Free sprint								
John Mordes	Cross-country cross	5:11.00	69	Did not advance					

Girls

Athlete	Event	Qualification		Quarterfinal		Semifinal		Final	
Athlete	Event	Time	Rank	Time	Rank	Time	Rank	Time	Rank
Rosie Fordham	5 km classic	—N/a							
Rosie Fordham	Free sprint								
Rosie Fordham	Cross-country cross	5:44.41	48	Did not advance					
Zana Evans	5 km classic	—N/a							
Zana Evans	Free sprint								
Zana Evans	Cross-country cross	5:36.38	41	Did not advance					

== Freestyle skiing ==
- Abi Harrigan
- Mia Rennie
- Gus Broersen
- Zoe Michael
- Kyra Wheatley
- Ben Wynn
- Jasper Cobcroft

== Ice hockey ==
- Nikki Sharp
- Courtney Mahoney
- Molly Lukowiak
- Ebony Brunt
- Sai Lake
- Riley Langille

== Short track speed skating ==
Two Australian skaters achieved quota places for Australia based on the results of the 2019 World Junior Short Track Speed Skating Championships. but choose to use only one quota.

Boys

Athlete	Event	Quarterfinal		Semifinal		Final	
Athlete	Event	Time	Rank	Time	Rank	Time	Rank
Kieran Guan	500 m						
Kieran Guan	1000 m						

== Snowboarding ==
- Lily Jekel
- Alexandra Chen
- Sunny Steele
- Amber Essex
- Josie Baff
- Finn Sadler

== See also ==
- Australia at the 2020 Summer Olympics
