= Denmark at the 2020 Winter Youth Olympics =

- IOC code: DEN
- NOC: Denmark Olympic Committee
- Website: www.dif.dk

in Lausanne
- Competitors: 26 in 5 sports
- Medals: Gold 0 Silver 0 Bronze 1 Total 1

Winter Youth Olympics appearances
- 2012; 2016; 2020; 2024

Denmark competed at the 2020 Winter Youth Olympics in Lausanne, Switzerland from 9 to 22 January 2020.

== Medalists ==
Medal	Name	Sport	Event	Date
Bronze	Aya Juhl Petersen	Ice hockey	Girls' 3x3 mixed tournament	15 January

== Alpine skiing ==
Girls

Athlete	Event	Run 1		Run 2		Total	
Athlete	Event	Time	Rank	Time	Rank	Time	Rank
Kristiane Rør Madsen	Super-G	—N/a				DNF	
Kristiane Rør Madsen	Combined	DNF					
Kristiane Rør Madsen	Giant slalom	1:10.71	36	1:09.98	29	2:20.69	28
Kristiane Rør Madsen	Slalom	51.34	34	46.76	17	1:38.13	22

== Cross-country skiing ==
Boys

Athlete	Event	Qualification		Quarterfinal		Semifinal		Final	
Athlete	Event	Time	Rank	Time	Rank	Time	Rank	Time	Rank
Hjalmar Michelsen	10 km classic	—N/a						30:23.3	45
Hjalmar Michelsen	Freestyle sprint	3:29.65	36	Did not advance					
Hjalmar Michelsen	Cross-country cross	4:42.27	43	Did not advance					

== Curling ==
Denmark qualified a mixed team of four athletes.

Mixed team

Team	Event	Group Stage						Quarterfinal	Semifinal	Final / BM	
Team	Event	Opposition Score	Opposition Score	Opposition Score	Opposition Score	Opposition Score	Rank	Opposition Score	Opposition Score	Opposition Score	Rank
Jonathan Vilandt; Karolina Jensen; Kilian Thune; Natalie Wiksten	Mixed team	Hungary; L 2 – 6	Germany; L 4 – 8	Brazil; W 12 – 3	Switzerland; L 4 – 6	China; W 9 – 3	4	did not advance			13

Mixed doubles

Athletes	Event	Round of 48	Round of 24	Round of 12	Round of 6	Semifinals	Final / BM	
Athletes	Event	Opposition Result	Opposition Result	Opposition Result	Opposition Result	Opposition Result	Opposition Result	Rank
Karolina Jensen (DEN); Zhai Zhixin (CHN)	Mixed doubles	Forbregd (NOR); Vonda (LAT); W 10–5	Kobayashi (JPN); Tuaz (FRA); L 7–8	Did not advance				13
Lisa Norrlander (SWE); Kilian Thune (DEN)	Mixed doubles	Nagy (HUN); Young (CAN); L 5–11	Did not advance					25
Kim Ji-yoon (KOR); Jonathan Vilandt (DEN)	Mixed doubles	Gregori (SLO); Winz (SUI); L 3–7	Did not advance					25
Natalie Wiksten (DEN); Ross Craik (GBR)	Mixed doubles	Tabata (JPN); Mäesalu (EST); W 8–6	Farková (CZE); Landelius (SWE); L 6–12	Did not advance				13

== Ice hockey ==
Summary

Key:

- OT – Overtime
- GWS – Match decided by penalty-shootout

Team	Event	Group Stage			Semifinal	Final	
Team	Event	Opposition Score	Opposition Score	Rank	Opposition Score	Opposition Score	Rank
Denmark boys'	Boys' tournament	Canada; L 0–6	Russia; L 0–9	3	Did not advance		

== Skeleton ==
Athlete	Event	Run 1		Run 2		Total	
Athlete	Event	Time	Rank	Time	Rank	Time	Rank
Rasmus Johansen	Boys	1:10.57	8	1:10.95	13	2:21.52	9

== See also ==
- Denmark at the 2020 Summer Olympics
