= Chinese Taipei at the 2020 Winter Youth Olympics =

- IOC code: TPE
- NOC: Chinese Taipei Olympic Committee

in Lausanne, Switzerland January 10–22
- Competitors: 14 in 6 sports
- Medals: Gold 0 Silver 0 Bronze 0 Total 0

Winter Youth Olympics appearances (overview)
- 2012; 2016; 2020; 2024

Chinese Taipei competed at the 2020 Winter Youth Olympics in Lausanne, Switzerland from 9 to 22 January 2020.

== Medalists ==
Medals awarded to participants of mixed-NOC teams are represented in italics. These medals are not counted towards the individual NOC medal tally.

Medal	Name	Sport	Event	Date
Silver	Lin Wei-yu	Ice hockey	Boys' 3x3 mixed tournament	15 January
Silver	Chang En-ni	Ice hockey	Girls' 3x3 mixed tournament	15 January
Silver	Chang Hui	Short track speed skating	Mixed NOC team relay	22 January

== Alpine skiing ==
Girls

Athlete	Event	Run 1		Run 2		Total	
Athlete	Event	Time	Rank	Time	Rank	Time	Rank
Lee Wen-yi	Giant slalom	DNF					
Lee Wen-yi	Slalom	1:11.97	45	1:13.86	36	2:25.84	36

== Bobsleigh ==
Athlete	Event	Run 1		Run 2		Total	
Athlete	Event	Time	Rank	Time	Rank	Time	Rank
Chen Yu-lun	Boys'	1:15.68	18	1:15.31	17	2:30.99	18
Lin Yu-hsin	Girls'	1:16.98	18	1:16.49	18	2:33.47	18

== Ice hockey ==
=== Mixed NOC 3x3 tournament ===
Boys

- Chen Chih-yuan
- Lin Wei-yu

Girls

- Chang En-ni
- Huang Chun-lin
- Kao Wei-ting

== Luge ==
Boys

Athlete	Event	Run 1		Run 2		Total	
Athlete	Event	Time	Rank	Time	Rank	Time	Rank
Yang Shih-hsun	Singles	57.319	26	56.497	22	1:53.816	25
Yeh Meng-Jhe	Singles	56.615	24	56.516	23	1:53.131	24
Yang Shih-hsun; Yeh Meng-Jhe	Doubles	55.948	7	55.911	6	1:51.859	6

== Short track speed skating ==
Boys

Athlete	Event	Heats		Quarterfinal		Semifinal		Final	
Athlete	Event	Time	Rank	Time	Rank	Time	Rank	Time	Rank
Liao Wei-cheng	500 m	44.147	3	did not advance					
Liao Wei-cheng	1000 m	1:43.625	3	did not advance					

Girls

Athlete	Event	Heats		Quarterfinal		Semifinal		Final	
Athlete	Event	Time	Rank	Time	Rank	Time	Rank	Time	Rank
Chang Hui	500 m	47.898	2	46.837	4	did not advance			
Chang Hui	1000 m	1:50.122	2	1:39.495	2	1:28.718	3	1:34.150	8

Mixed NOC team relay

Athlete	Team	Semifinal		Final	
Athlete	Team	Time	Rank	Time	Rank
Chang Hui	G	4:11.042	1	4:12.972	2nd place, silver medalist(s)

== Skeleton ==
Athlete	Event	Run 1		Run 2		Total	
Athlete	Event	Time	Rank	Time	Rank	Time	Rank
Yang Po-wei	Boys'	1:13.58	18	1:12.79	17	2:26.37	17
Lu Chia-hsin	Girls'	1:18.49	20	1:18.73	20	2:37.22	20

== See also ==
- Chinese Taipei at the 2020 Summer Olympics
