= Manex Silva =

Brazilian cross-country skier (born 2002)

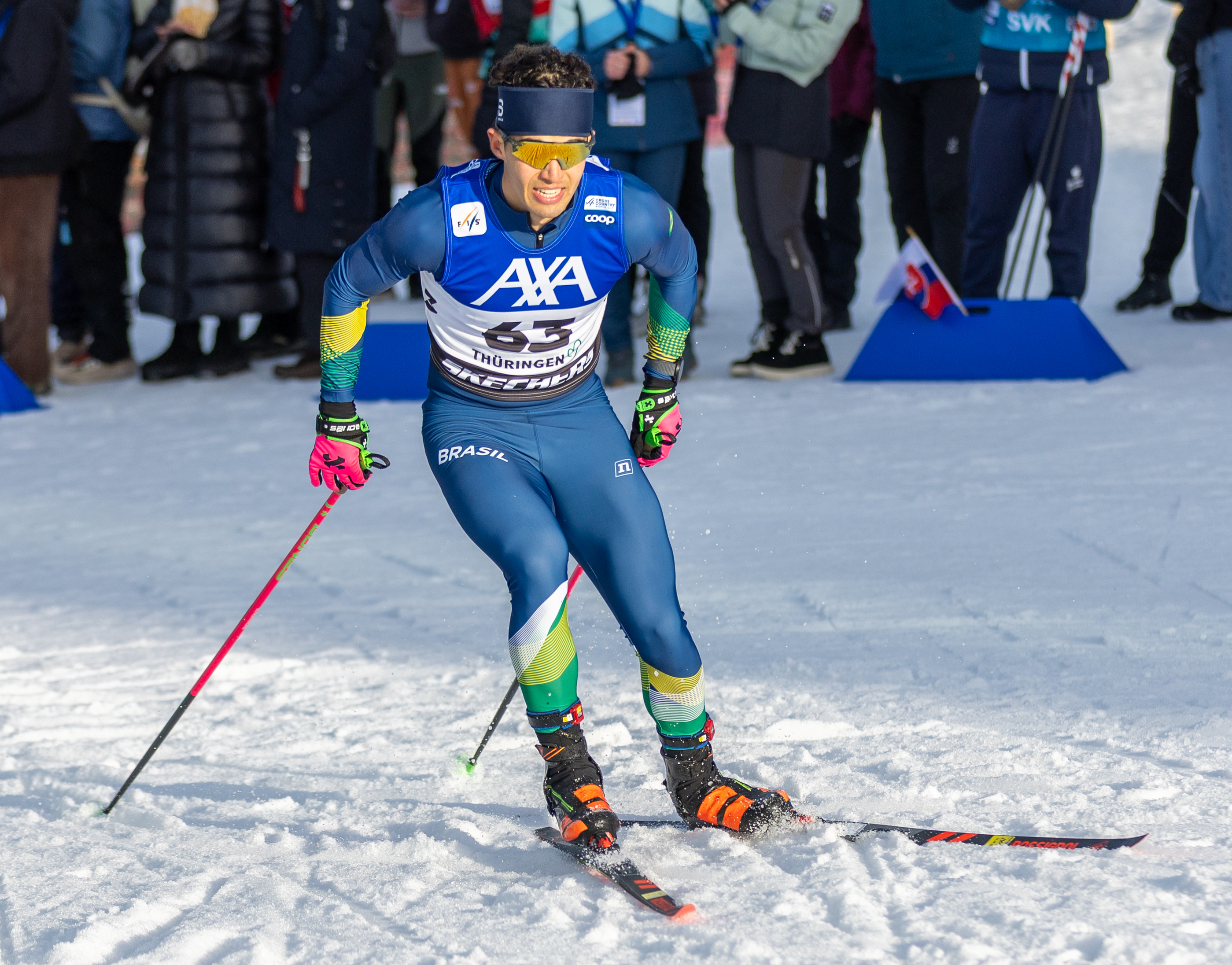

Personal information
- Born: 24 July 2002 (age 24) Rio Branco, Acre, Brazil

Sport
- Country: Brazil
- Sport: Cross-country skiing

Achievements and titles
- Olympic finals: 2022, 2026

Manex Silva, born 24 July 2002 is a Brazilian cross-country skier. He was part of the Brazilian team at the 2020 Winter Youth Olympics in cross-country skiing.

At the 2022 Winter Olympics in Beijing he placed 90th in the 15 kilometre classical, 67th in the 30 kilometre skiathlon and 58th in the 50 kilometre freestyle, the distance of which was shortened to 28.4 km due to adverse weather conditions. During the closing ceremony of the Games, he paraded as the flag bearer for Brazil.

At the 2026 Winter Olympics in Milano Cortina in Italy, he finished in 97th place in the 10 kilometre freestyle. In the men's sprint the skier placed in 48th place, which is the best result of a Brazilian man at the Cross-country skiing at the Winter Olympics.
