= Latvia at the 2020 Winter Youth Olympics =

- IOC code: LAT
- NOC: Latvian Olympic Committee
- Website: www.olimpiade.lv

in Lausanne
- Competitors: 30 in 9 sports
- Medals: Gold 1 Silver 2 Bronze 2 Total 5

Winter Youth Olympics appearances
- 2012; 2016; 2020; 2024

Latvia competed at the 2020 Winter Youth Olympics in Lausanne, Switzerland from 9 to 22 January 2020.

== Medalists ==
Medals awarded to participants of mixed-NOC teams are represented in italics. These medals are not counted towards the individual NOC medal tally.

Medal	Name	Sport	Event	Date
Gold	Gints Bērziņš	Luge	Boys' singles	18 January
Silver	Kaspars Rinks; Ardis Liepiņš	Luge	Boys' doubles	17 January
Silver	Elvis Veinbergs	Skeleton	Boys'	20 January
Bronze	Viktorija Ziediņa; Selīna Elizabete Zvilna	Luge	Girls' doubles	18 January
Bronze	Justīne Maskale; Gints Bērziņš; Kaspars Rinks; Ardis Liepiņš	Luge	Mixed team relay	20 January

== Alpine skiing ==
Boys

Athlete	Event	Run 1		Run 2		Total	
Athlete	Event	Time	Rank	Time	Rank	Time	Rank
Kristofers Gulbis	Giant slalom	1:12.87	46	1:11.26	37	2:24.13	39
Kristofers Gulbis	Slalom						

Girls

Athlete	Event	Run 1		Run 2		Total	
Athlete	Event	Time	Rank	Time	Rank	Time	Rank
Dženifera Ģērmane	Giant slalom	1:06.47	13	DNF			
Dženifera Ģērmane	Slalom						

== Biathlon ==
Boys

Athlete	Event	Time	Misses	Rank
Ņikita Kondrašovs	Sprint	23:41.2	5 (2+3)	73
Ņikita Kondrašovs	Individual	39:53.4	4 (1+1+0+2)	49
Aleksandrs Kuzņecovs	Sprint	22:44.7	3 (1+2)	53
Aleksandrs Kuzņecovs	Individual	43:29.8	9 (2+2+2+3)	82
Imants Maļina	Sprint	23:24.1	4 (1+3)	67
Imants Maļina	Individual	40:35.7	5 (1+2+1+1)	56

Girls

Athlete	Event	Time	Misses	Rank
Signe Miķelsone	Sprint	22:21.3	2 (1+1)	69
Signe Miķelsone	Individual	44:11.7	10 (2+3+4+1)	81
Anastasija Nedaivodina	Sprint	25:12.0	2 (1+1)	85
Anastasija Nedaivodina	Individual	44:38.6	7 (2+1+2+2)	82
Līva Šahno	Sprint	22:58.0	4 (1+3)	72
Līva Šahno	Individual	40:06.1	5 (1+1+0+3)	56

Mixed

Athletes	Event	Time	Misses	Rank
Līva Šahno; Ņikita Kondrašovs	Single mixed relay	49:42.5	5+17	24
Signe Miķelsone; Līva Šahno; Imants Maļina; Aleksandrs Kuzņecovs	Mixed relay	1:22:06.8	4+11	20

== Curling ==
Latvia qualified a mixed team of four athletes.

Mixed team

Team	Event	Group stage						Quarterfinal	Semifinal	Final / BM	
Team	Event	Opposition Score	Opposition Score	Opposition Score	Opposition Score	Opposition Score	Rank	Opposition Score	Opposition Score	Opposition Score	Rank
Ričards Vonda; Ērika Patrīcija Bitmete; Eduards Seļiverstovs; Anna Lasmane	Mixed team	Czech Republic; L 0 – 7	United States; L 0 – 8	Italy; L 7 – 10	Sweden; L 7 – 9	Japan; L 4 – 9	6	Did not advance			22

Mixed doubles

Athletes	Event	Round of 48	Round of 24	Round of 12	Round of 6	Semifinals	Final / BM	
Athletes	Event	Opposition Result	Opposition Result	Opposition Result	Opposition Result	Opposition Result	Opposition Result	Rank
Ingeborg Forbregd (NOR); Ričards Vonda (LAT)	Mixed doubles	Jensen (DEN); Zhai (CHN); L 5–10	Did not advance					

== See also ==
- Latvia at the 2020 Summer Olympics
