= Curling at the 2020 Winter Youth Olympics – Mixed team =

Curling – Mixed team at the III Winter Youth Olympic Games
- Venue: Palladium de Champéry
- Dates: 10–16 January

Medalists
1st place, gold medalist(s)		Lukas Høstmælingen; Grunde Buraas; Nora Østgård; Ingeborg Forbregd	Norway
2nd place, silver medalist(s)		Takumi Maeda; Momoha Tabata; Asei Nakahara; Mina Kobayashi	Japan
3rd place, bronze medalist(s)		Valeriia Denisenko; Mikhail Vlasenko; Alina Fakhurtdinova; Nikolai Lysakov	Russia

Mixed team curling at the 2020 Winter Youth Olympics was held from 10 to 16 January at the Palladium de Champéry in Champéry, Switzerland.

== Teams ==
=== Group A ===
Canada	Spain	Estonia
Skip: Nathan Young; Third: Emily Deschenes; Second: Jaedon Neuert; Lead: Lauren Rajala	Skip: Aleix Raubert; Third: Carmen Pérez; Second: Oriol Gastó; Lead: Ana Vázquez	Skip: Henry Grünberg; Third: Natali Vedro; Second: Romet Mäesalu; Lead: Katariina Klammer
South Korea	Poland	Russia
Skip: Park Sang-woo; Third: Park You-been; Second: Moon Si-woo; Lead: Kim Ji-yoon	Fourth: Klaudia Szmidt; Third: Dominik Szmidt; Skip: Monika Wosińska; Lead: Robert Kamiński	Skip: Valeriia Denisenko; Third: Mikhail Vlasenko; Second: Alina Fakhurtdinova; Lead: Nikolai Lysakov

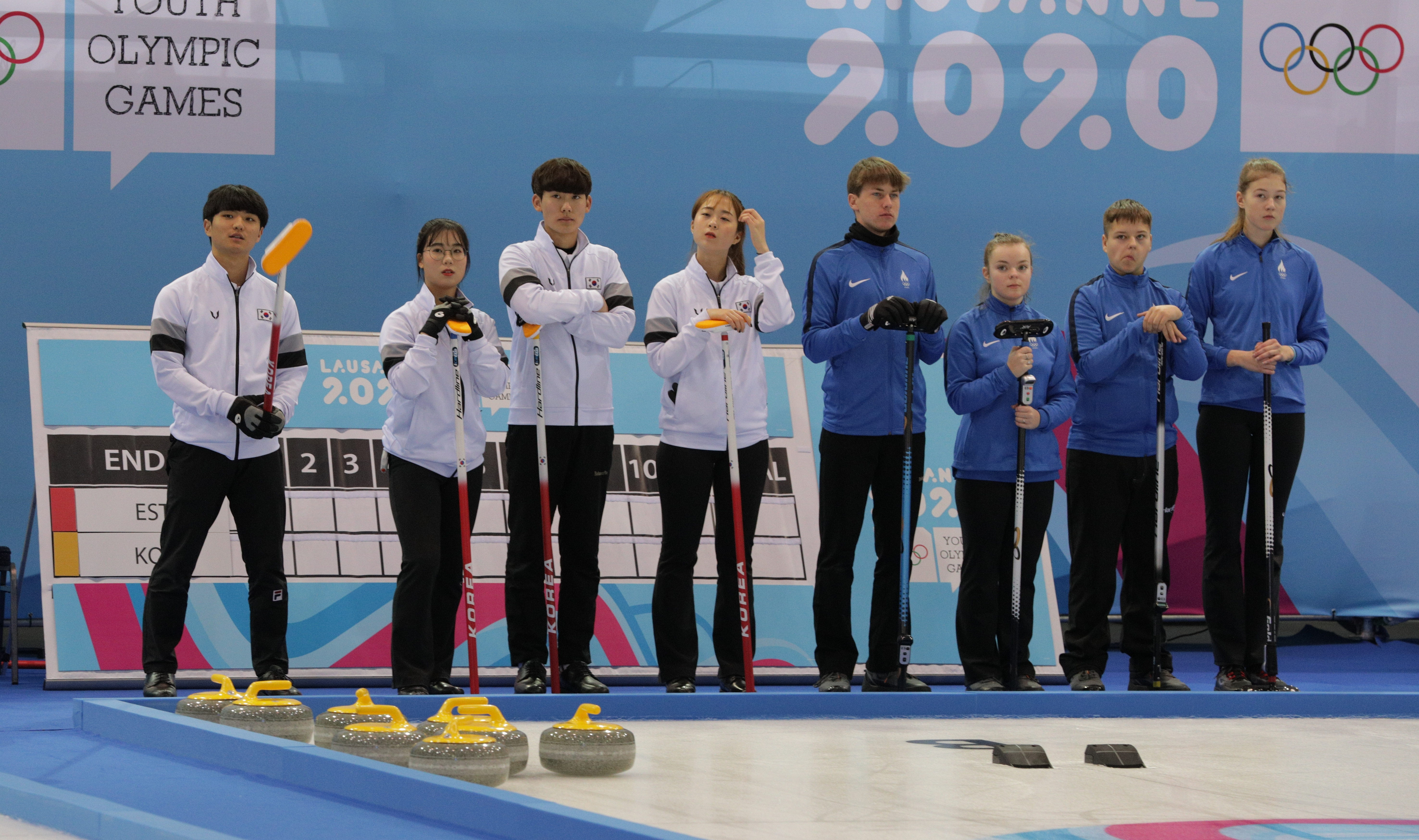
Teams Estonia and Korea

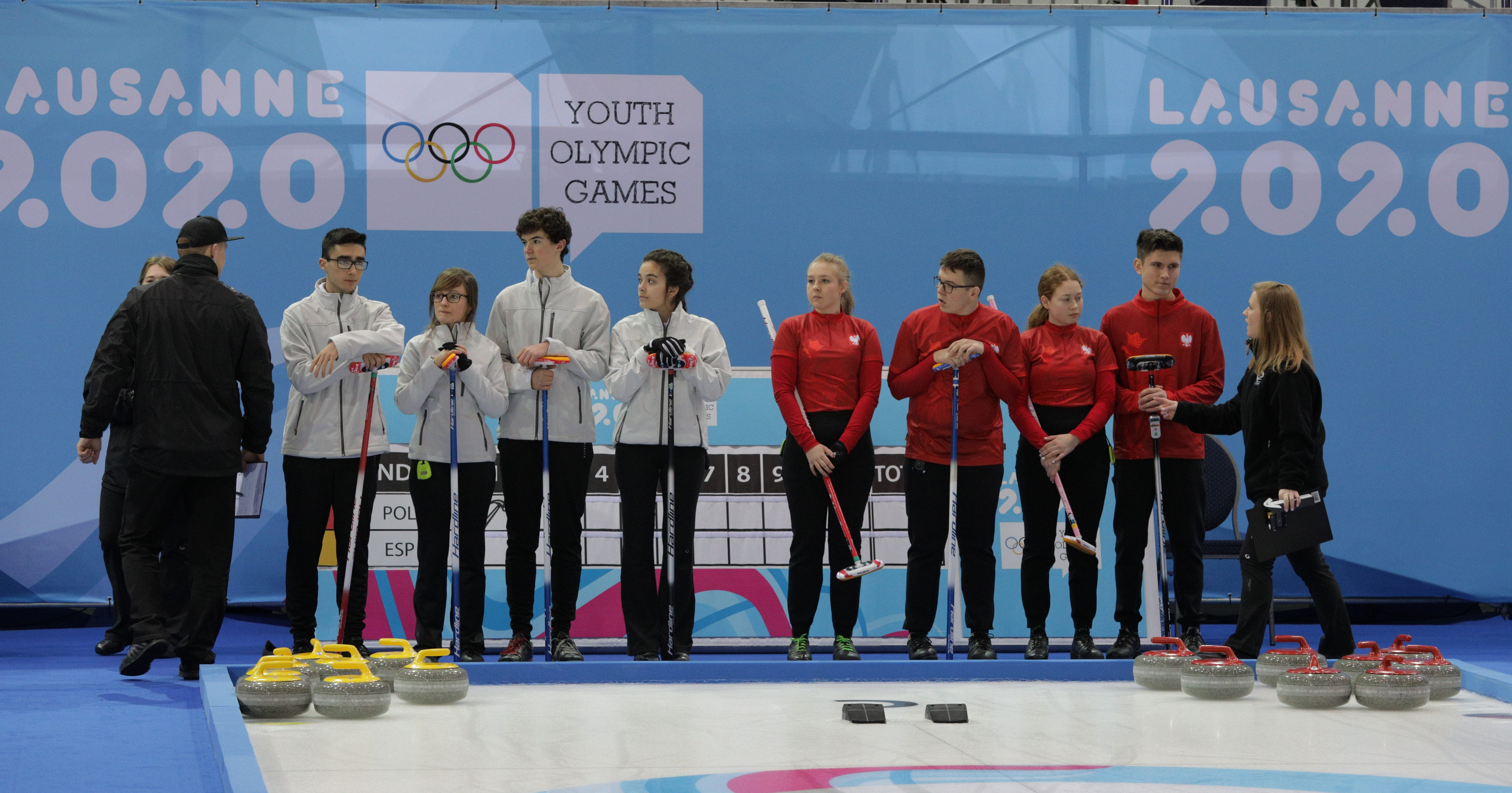
Teams Poland and Spain

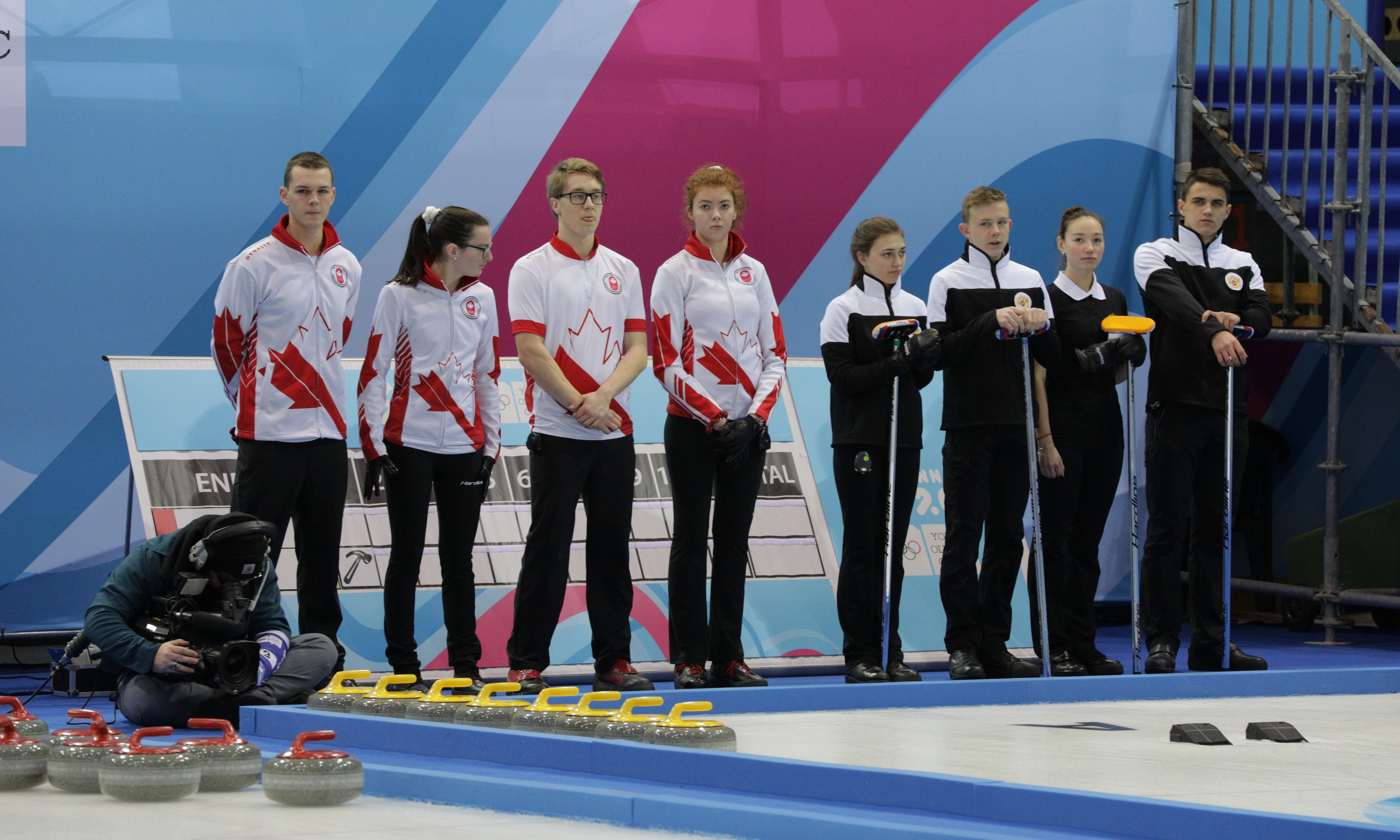
Teams Russia and Canada

=== Group B ===
Brazil	China	Denmark
Skip: Vitor Melo; Third: Gabriela Rogic Farias; Second: Michael Velve; Lead: Letícia Cid	Skip: Zhang Likun; Third: Liu Tong; Second: Zhai Zhixin; Lead: Pei Junhang	Skip: Jonathan Vilandt; Third: Karolina Jensen; Second: Kilian Thune; Lead: Natalie Wiksten
Germany	Hungary	Switzerland
Skip: Benjamin Kapp; Third: Kim Sutor; Second: Johannes Scheuerl; Lead: Zoé Antes	Fourth: Kristóf Szarvas; Third: Linda Joó; Skip: Lőrinc Tatár; Lead: Laura Nagy	Skip: Jan Iseli; Third: Xenia Schwaller; Second: Maximilian Winz; Lead: Malin da Ros

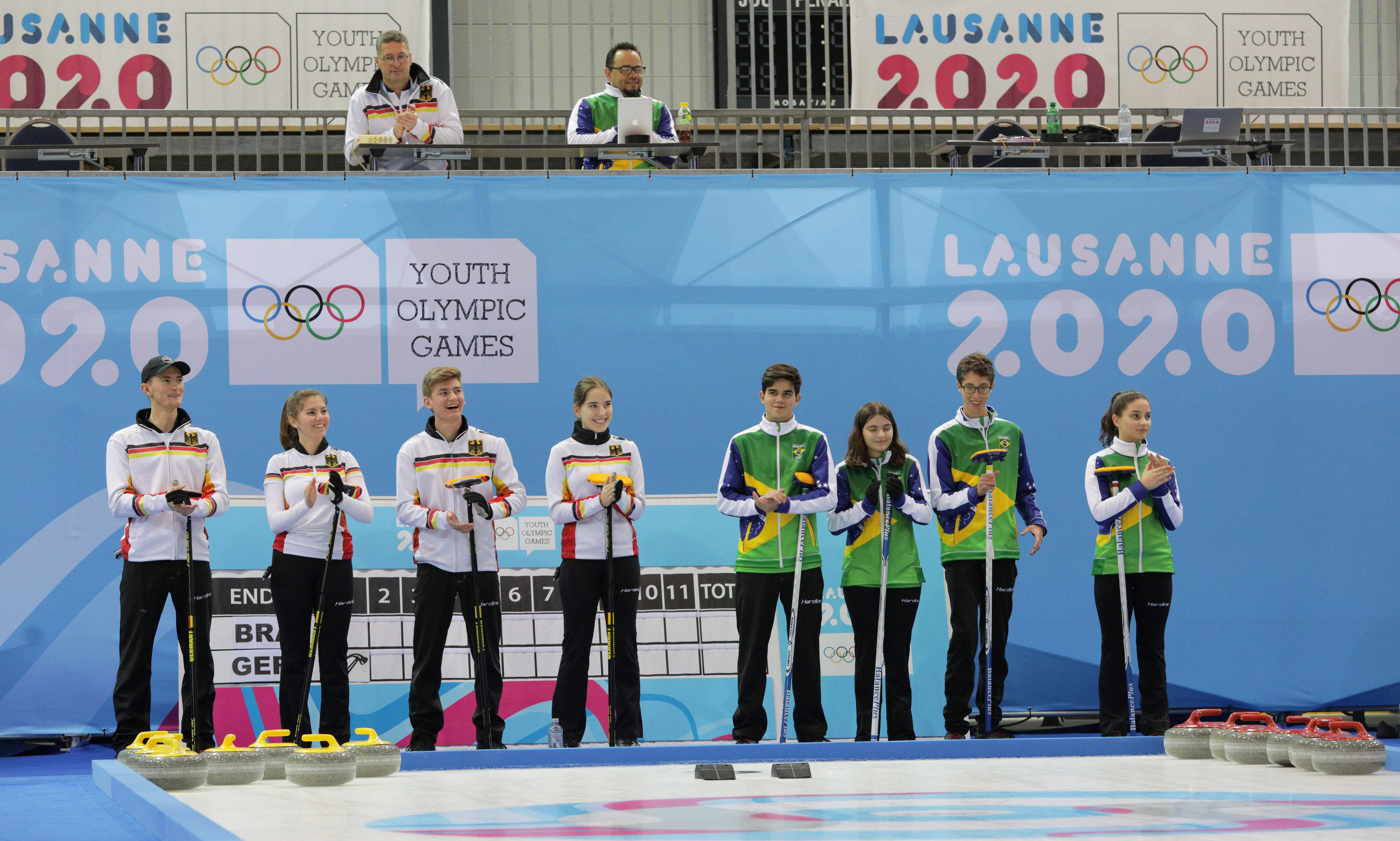
Teams Brazil and Germany

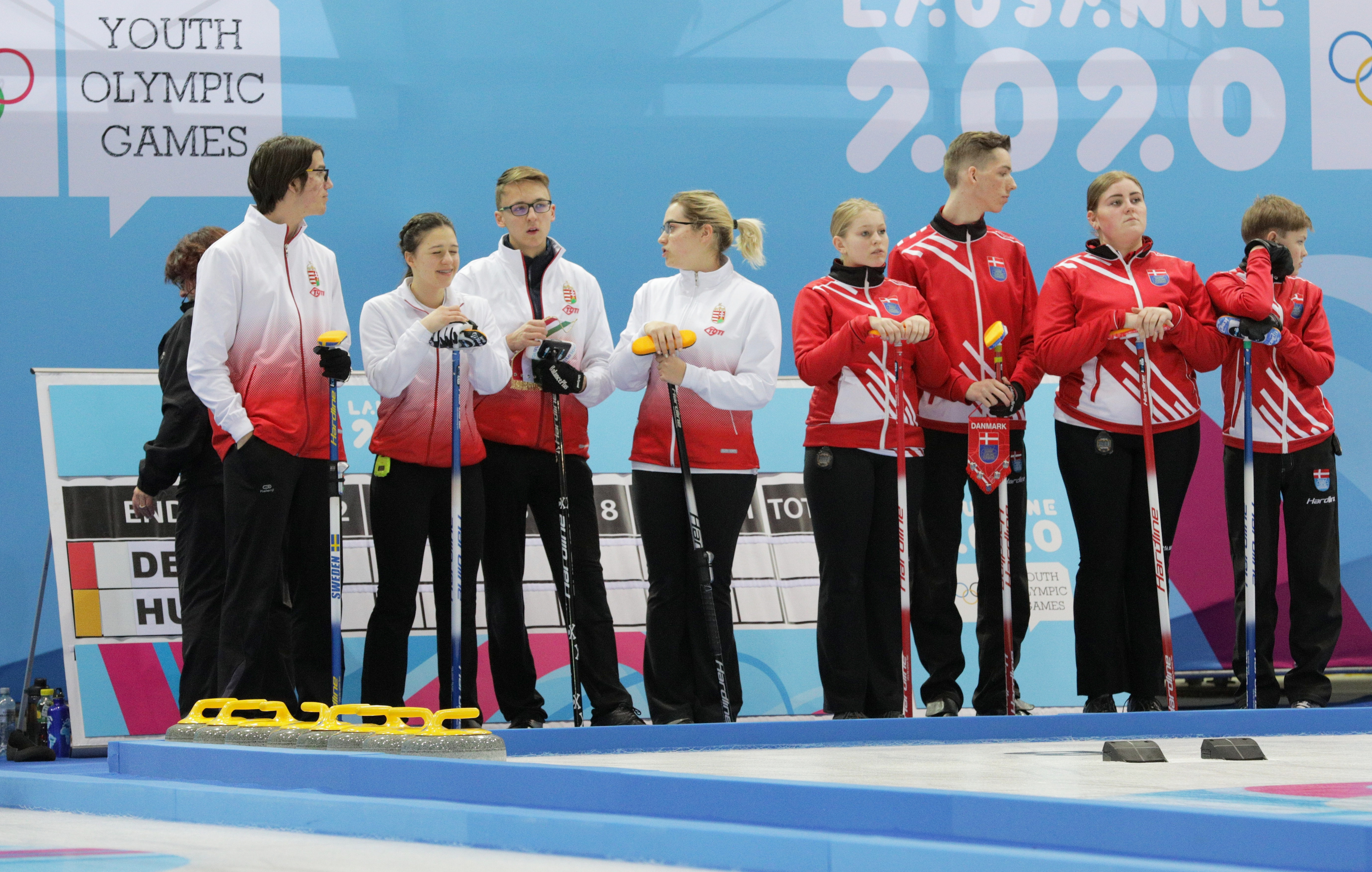
Teams Denmark and Hungary

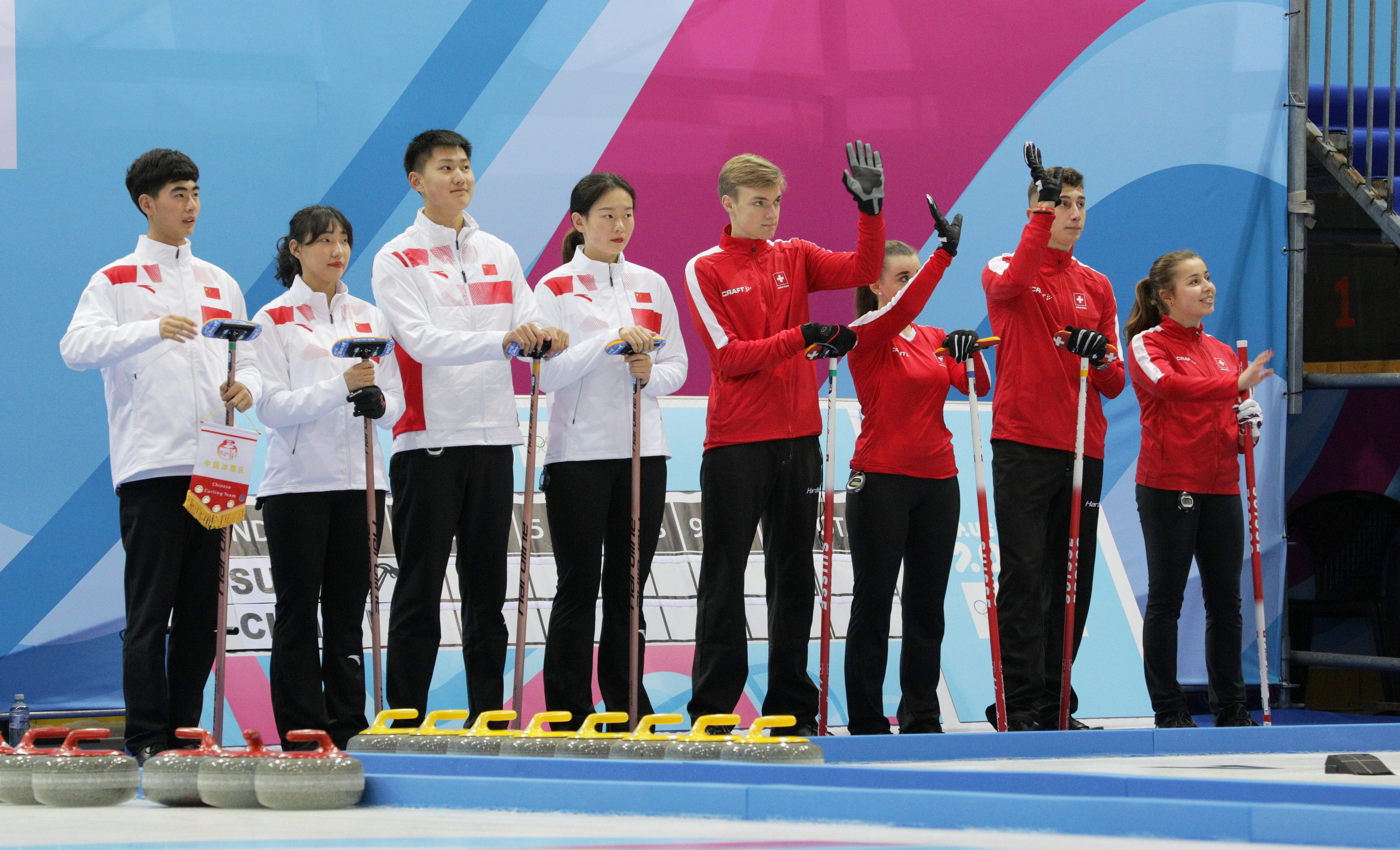
Teams Switzerland and China

=== Group C ===
France	Great Britain	Norway
Skip: Léo Tuaz; Third: Chana Beitone; Second: Merlin Gros-Soubzmaigne; Lead: Maëlle Vergnaud	Skip: Ross Craik; Third: Robyn Mitchell; Second: Jamie Rankin; Lead: Hannah Farries	Fourth: Grunde Buraas; Third: Nora Østgård; Skip: Lukas Høstmælingen; Lead: Ingeborg Forbregd
New Zealand	Slovenia	Turkey
Skip: Hunter Walker; Third: Zoe Harman; Second: William Becker; Lead: Lucy Neilson	Skip: Bine Sever; Third: Liza Gregori; Second: Jakob Omerzel; Lead: Sara Rigler	Fourth: Kadir Polat; Third: Berfin Şengül; Skip: Selahattin Eser; Lead: İfayet Şafak Çalıkuşu

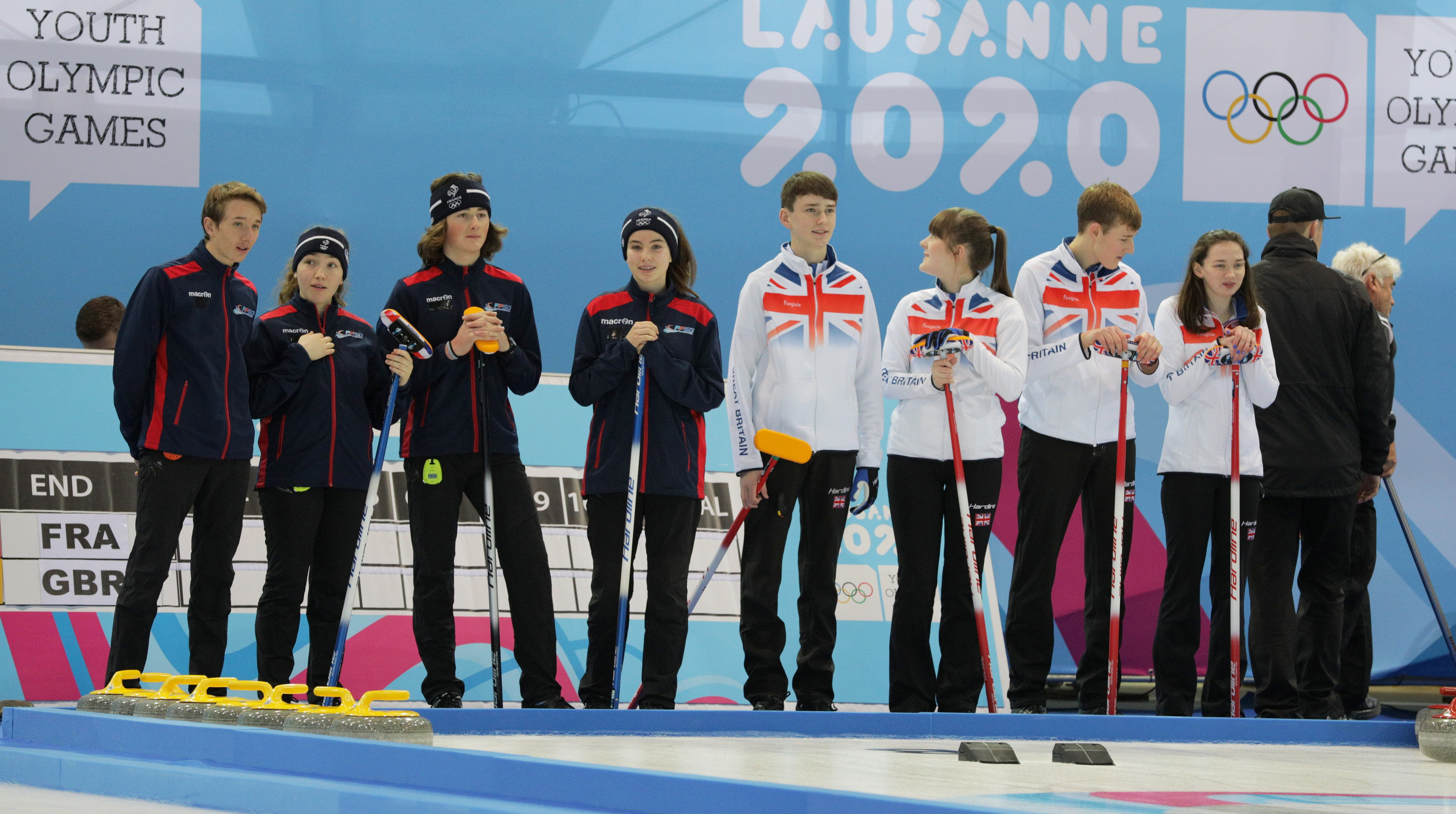
Teams France and Great Britain

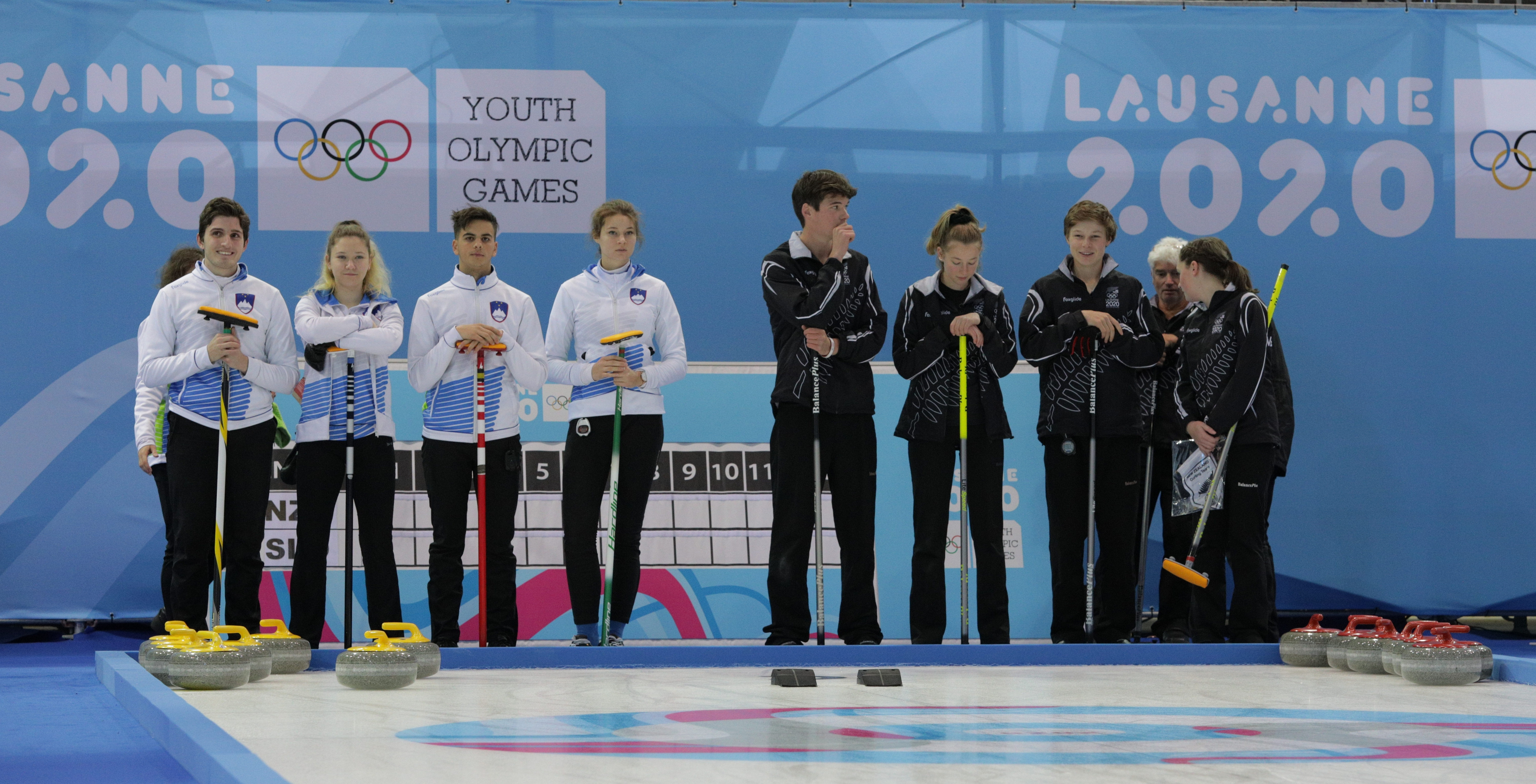
Teams New Zealand and Slovenia

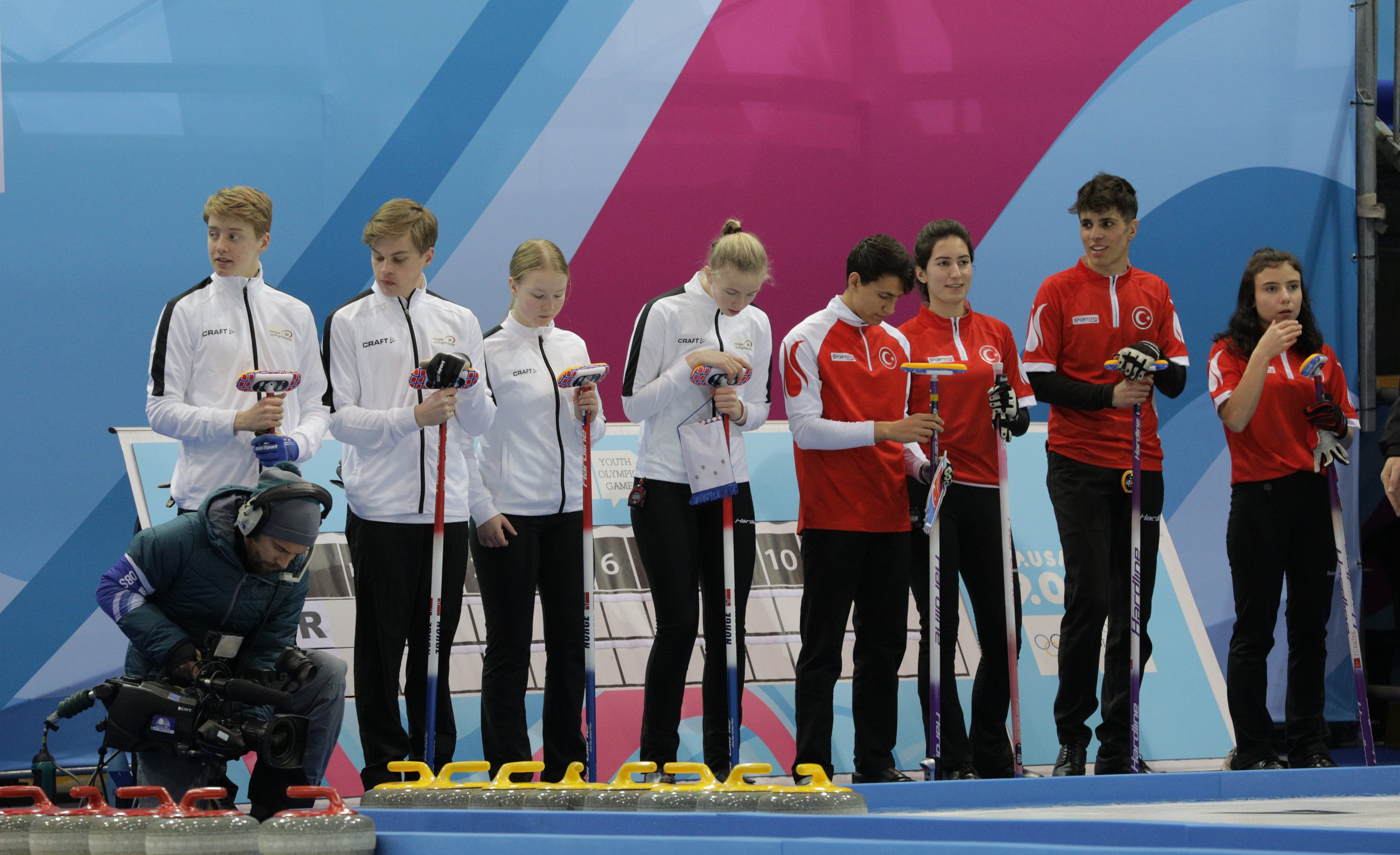
Teams Turkey and Norway

=== Group D ===
Czech Republic	Italy	Japan
Skip: Vít Chabičovský; Third: Zuzana Pražáková; Second: František Jiral; Lead: Kristyna Farková	Fourth: Francesco De Zanna; Third: Federica Ghedina; Second: Simone Piffer; Skip: Marta Lo Deserto	Skip: Takumi Maeda; Third: Momoha Tabata; Second: Asei Nakahara; Lead: Mina Kobayashi
Latvia	Sweden	United States
Skip: Ričards Vonda; Third: Anna Lasmane; Second: Eduards Seļiverstovs; Lead: Ērika Bitmete	Fourth: Axel Landelius; Third: Lisa Norrlander; Second: Olle Moberg; Skip: Nilla Hallström	Skip: Ethan Hebert; Third: Kaitlin Murphy; Second: Charlie Thompson; Lead: Alina Tschumakow

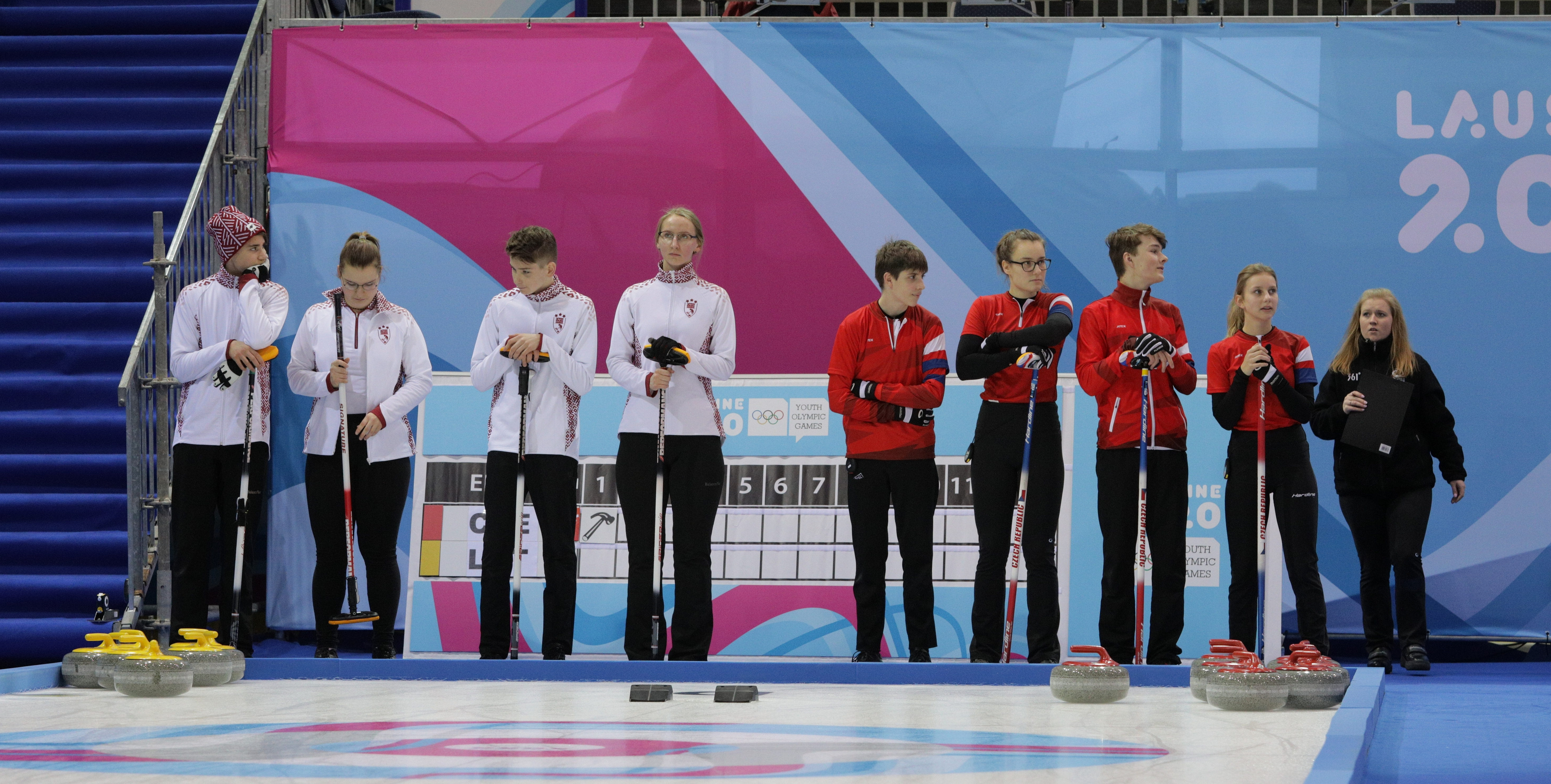
Teams Czech Republic and Latvia

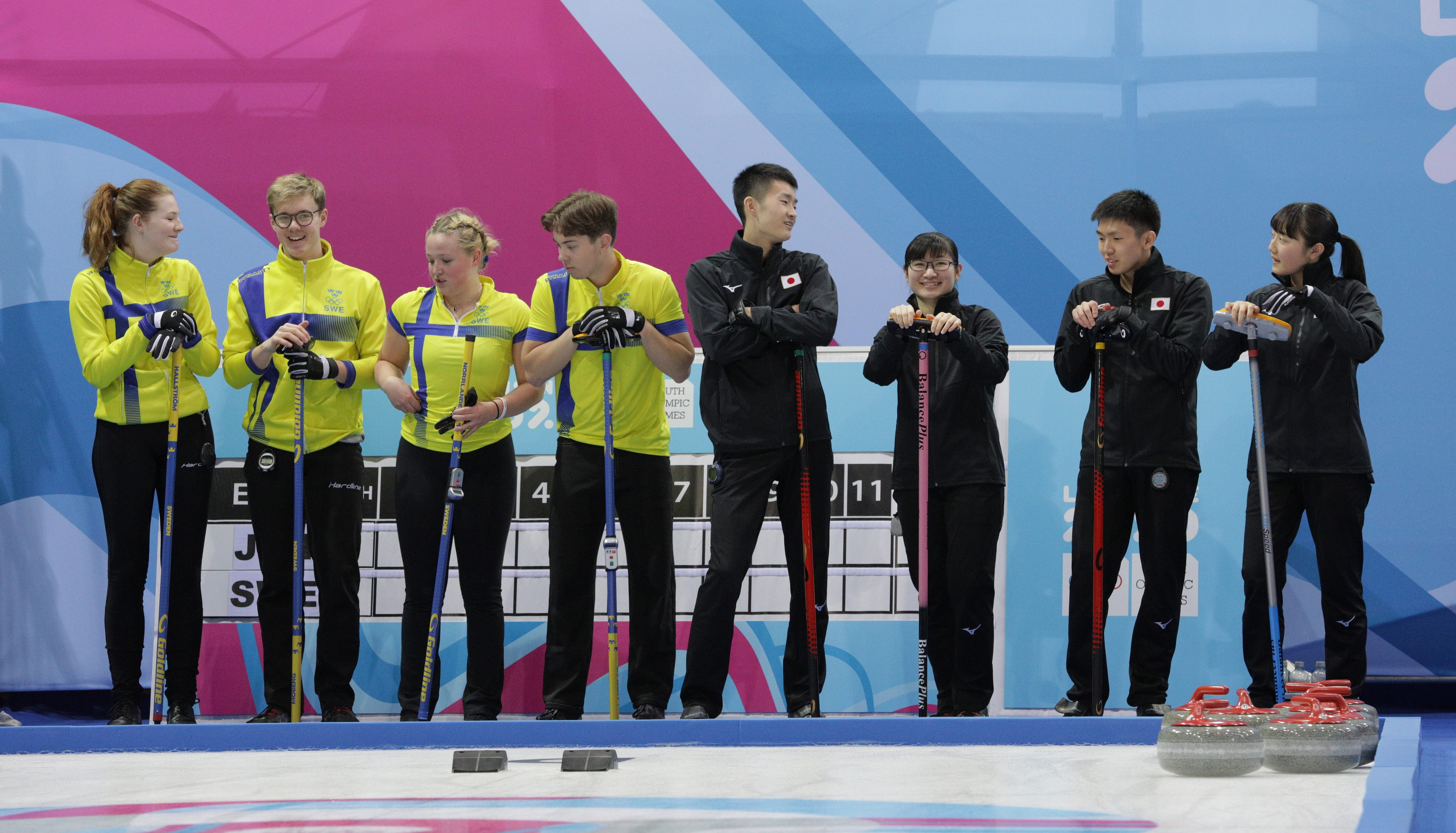
Teams Japan and Sweden

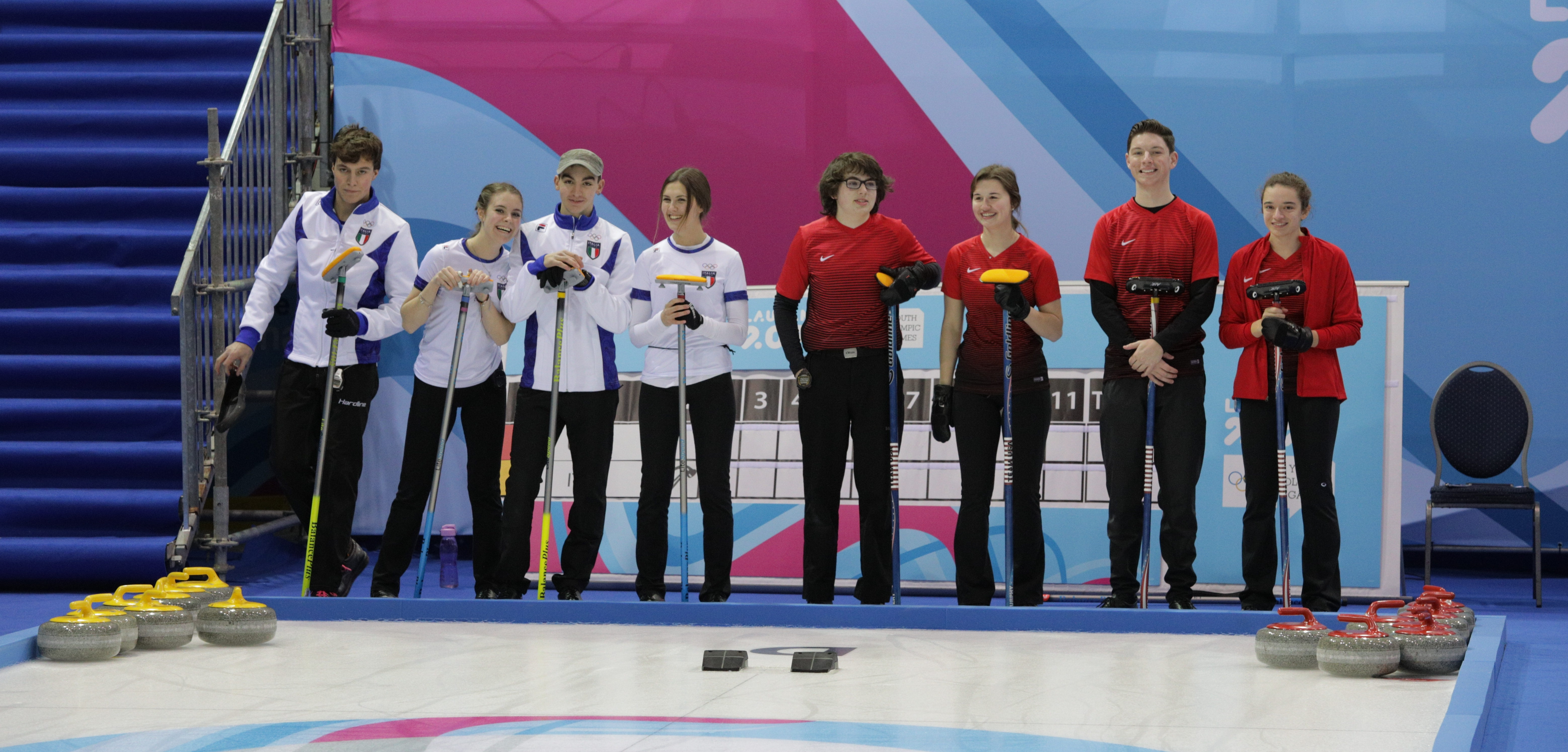
Teams USA and Italy

== Round Robin Standings ==
Key
Teams to Playoffs

Group A	Skip	W	L
Canada	Nathan Young	5	0
Russia	Valeriia Denisenko	4	1
South Korea	Park Sang-woo	3	2
Poland	Monika Wosińska	2	3
Spain	Aleix Raubert	1	4
Estonia	Henry Grünberg	0	5

Group B	Skip	W	L
Switzerland	Jan Iseli	5	0
Germany	Benjamin Kapp	4	1
China	Zhang Likun	2	3
Denmark	Jonathan Vilandt	2	3
Hungary	Lőrinc Tatár	2	3
Brazil	Vitor Melo	0	5

Group C	Skip	W	L
New Zealand	Hunter Walker	4	1
Norway	Lukas Høstmælingen	3	2
Great Britain	Ross Craik	3	2
Turkey	Selahattin Eser	2	3
Slovenia	Bine Sever	2	3
France	Léo Tuaz	1	4

Group D	Skip	W	L
Italy	Marta Lo Deserto	4	1
Japan	Takumi Maeda	4	1
Sweden	Nilla Hallström	3	2
Czech Republic	Vít Chabičovský	3	2
United States	Ethan Hebert	1	4
Latvia	Ričards Vonda	0	5

== Round robin results ==
All draw times are listed in Central European Time (UTC+01).

=== Group A ===
==== Friday, January 10 ====
Draw 1 9:00

Team	1	2	3	4	5	6	7	8	9	Final
Russia (Denisenko)	0	0	1	0	2	1	0	0	0	4
Canada (Young) 🔨	0	1	0	0	0	0	1	2	3	7

Team	1	2	3	4	5	6	7	8	Final
Estonia (Grünberg)	0	0	2	1	0	0	X	X	3
South Korea (Park) 🔨	5	3	0	0	3	4	X	X	15

Team	1	2	3	4	5	6	7	8	Final
Poland (Wosińska) 🔨	0	0	3	0	0	2	4	X	9
Spain (Raubert)	1	0	0	2	3	0	0	X	6

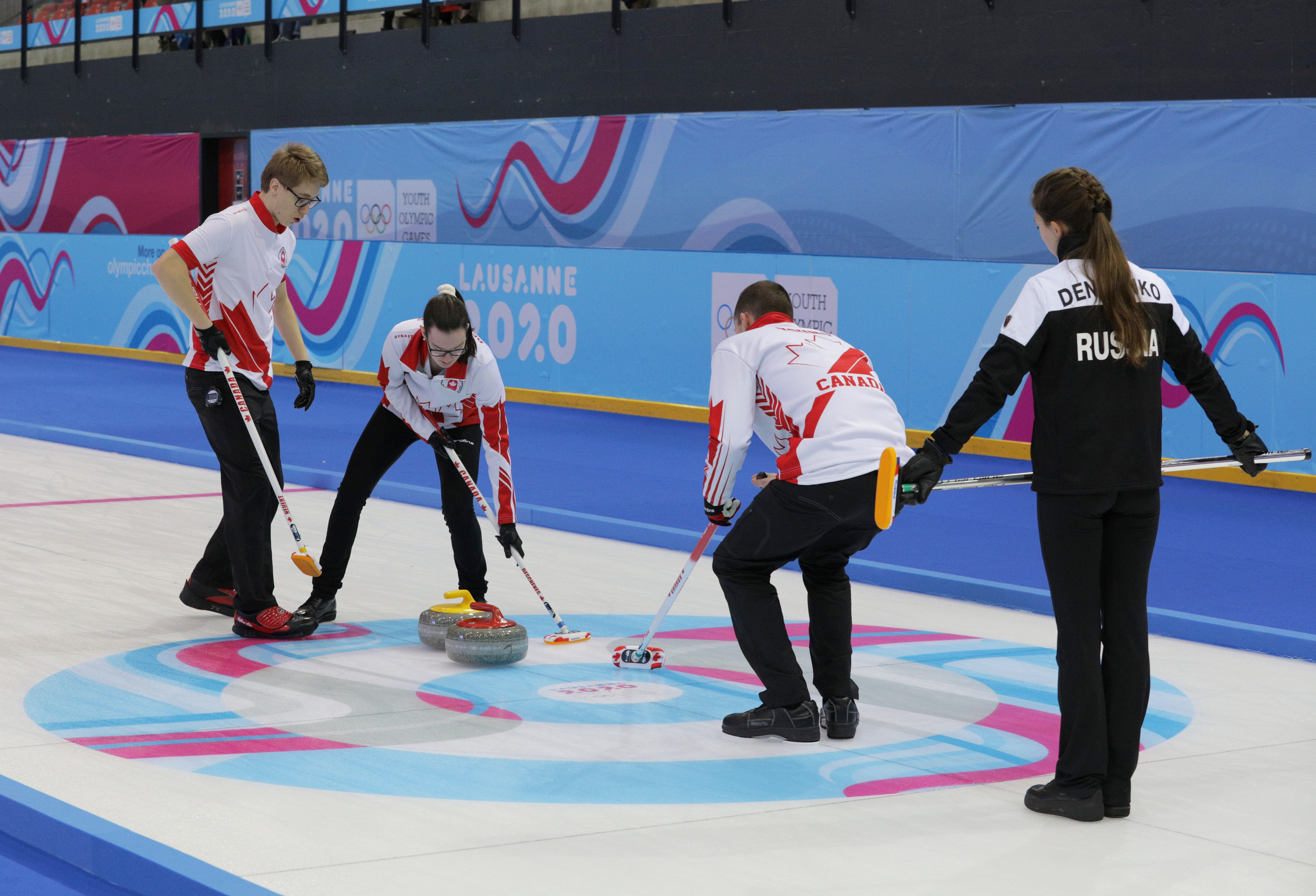
Russia vs. Canada

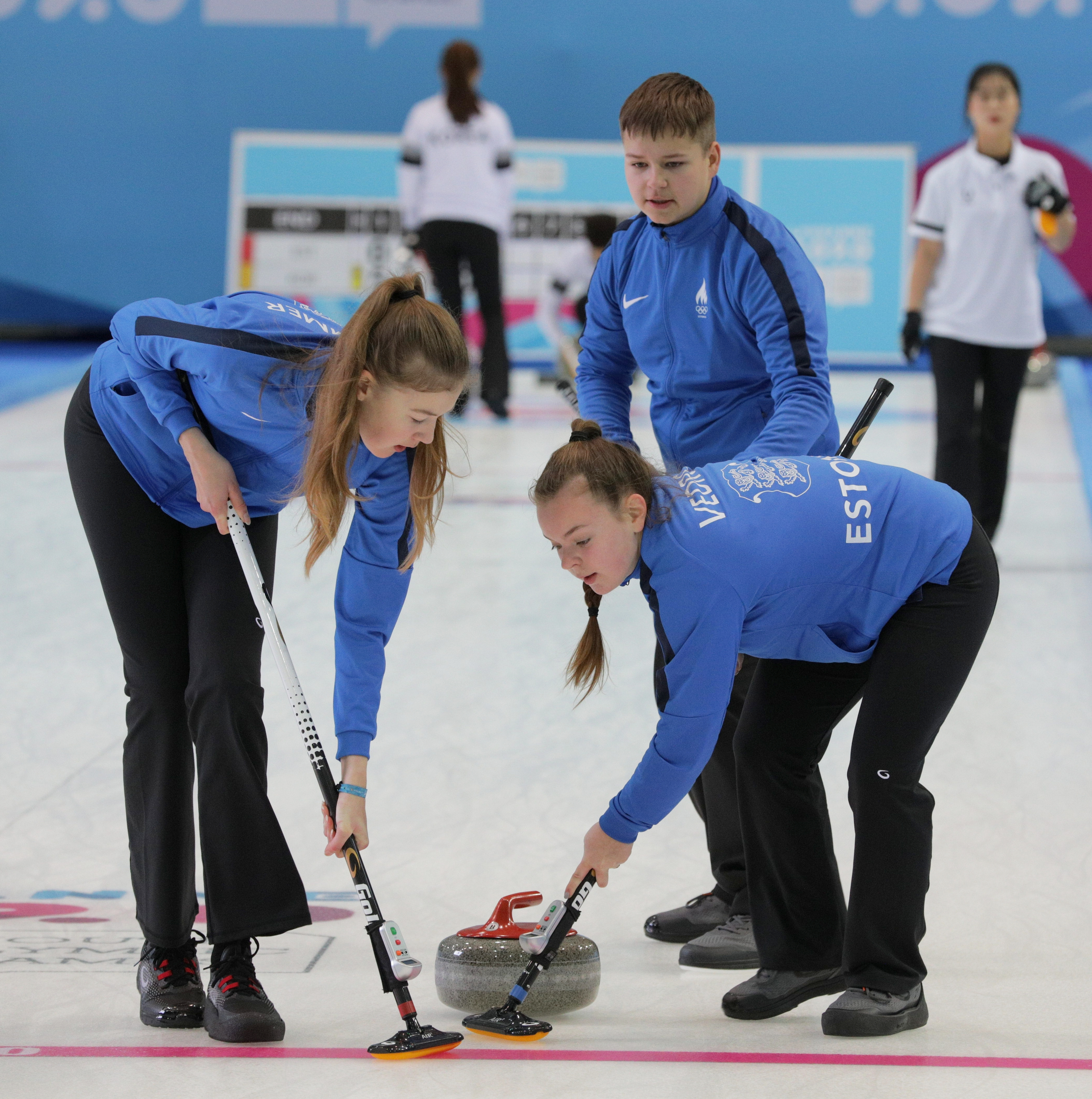
Estonia vs. Korea

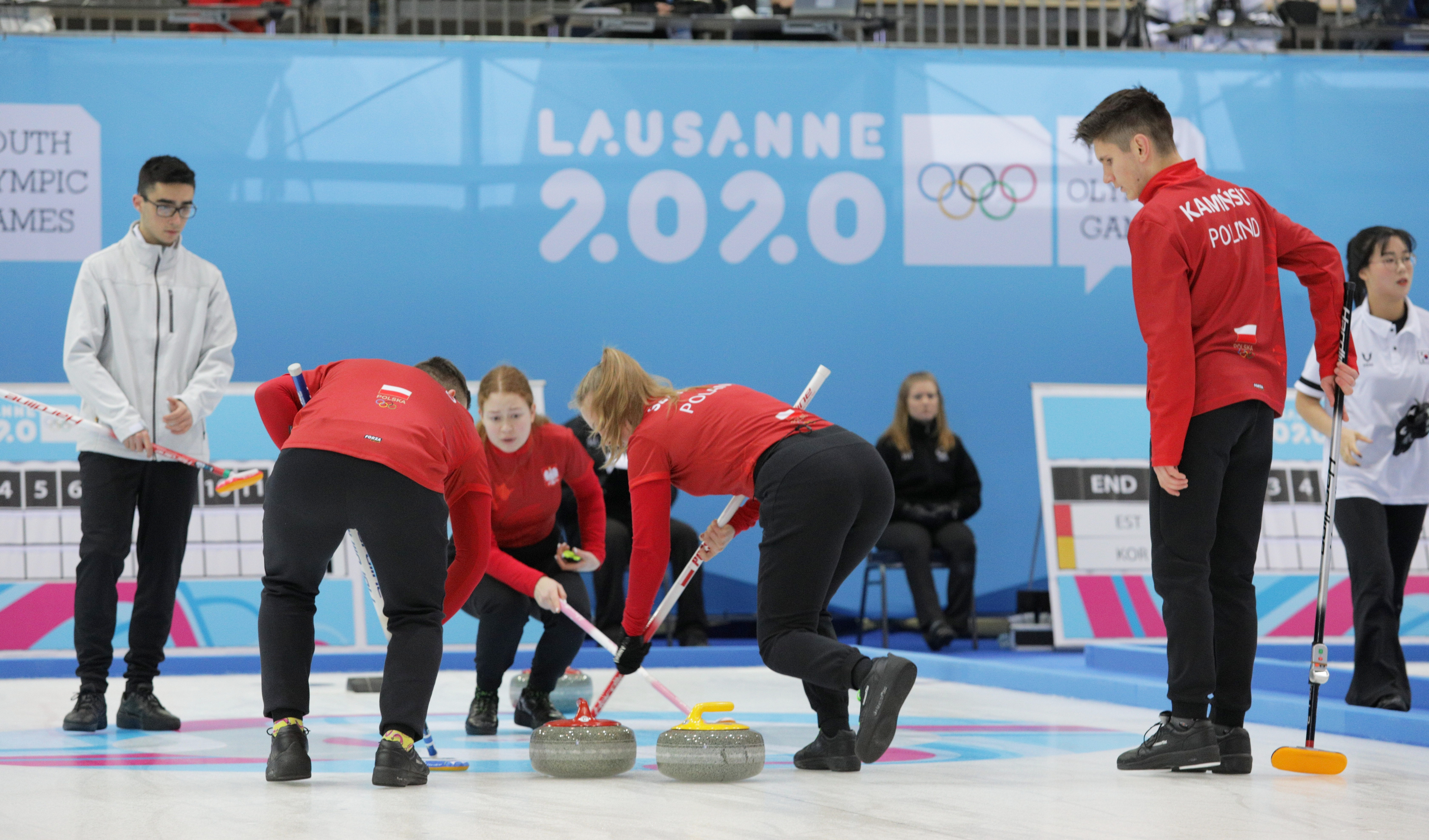
Poland vs. Spain

==== Saturday, January 11 ====
Draw 4 10:00

Team	1	2	3	4	5	6	7	8	Final
Spain (Raubert)	0	1	2	3	1	1	1	X	9
Estonia (Grünberg) 🔨	3	0	0	0	0	0	0	X	3

Draw 5 14:00

Team	1	2	3	4	5	6	7	8	Final
Poland (Wosińska)	0	0	0	0	1	3	0	0	4
Canada (Young) 🔨	0	1	1	1	0	0	1	2	6

Draw 6 18:00

Team	1	2	3	4	5	6	7	8	Final
Russia (Denisenko) 🔨	2	1	0	2	3	1	X	X	9
South Korea (Park)	0	0	2	0	0	0	X	X	2

==== Sunday, January 12 ====
Draw 9 18:00

Team	1	2	3	4	5	6	7	8	Final
Poland (Wosińska) 🔨	0	4	1	1	2	1	0	X	9
Estonia (Grünberg)	2	0	0	0	0	0	1	X	3

Team	1	2	3	4	5	6	7	8	Final
Spain (Raubert)	0	1	0	2	0	1	0	X	4
Russia (Denisenko) 🔨	5	0	2	0	1	0	3	X	11

Team	1	2	3	4	5	6	7	8	Final
Canada (Young) 🔨	0	1	3	0	1	0	1	X	6
South Korea (Park)	1	0	0	0	0	2	0	X	3

==== Monday, January 13 ====
Draw 11 14:00

Team	1	2	3	4	5	6	7	8	Final
Estonia (Grünberg)	0	0	1	0	0	2	1	X	4
Russia (Denisenko) 🔨	3	2	0	1	2	0	0	X	8

Team	1	2	3	4	5	6	7	8	Final
South Korea (Park)	1	0	0	1	0	1	1	1	5
Poland (Wosińska) 🔨	0	1	1	0	1	0	0	0	3

Team	1	2	3	4	5	6	7	8	Final
Spain (Raubert) 🔨	0	1	0	0	0	2	0	X	3
Canada (Young)	3	0	0	2	2	0	2	X	9

==== Tuesday, January 14 ====
Draw 13 10:00

Team	1	2	3	4	5	6	7	8	Final
South Korea (Park)	1	2	3	4	0	0	X	X	10
Spain (Raubert) 🔨	0	0	0	0	1	1	X	X	2

Team	1	2	3	4	5	6	7	8	Final
Canada (Young)	3	3	0	1	3	0	X	X	10
Estonia (Grünberg) 🔨	0	0	1	0	0	1	X	X	2

Team	1	2	3	4	5	6	7	8	Final
Russia (Denisenko) 🔨	0	2	0	2	0	1	0	X	5
Poland (Wosińska)	0	0	1	0	0	0	1	X	2

=== Group B ===
==== Friday, January 10 ====
Draw 3 18:00

Team	1	2	3	4	5	6	7	8	Final
Switzerland (Iseli) 🔨	0	1	2	1	0	1	0	X	5
China (Zhang)	1	0	0	0	1	0	1	X	3

Team	1	2	3	4	5	6	7	8	Final
Denmark (Vilandt)	0	0	0	2	0	0	0	X	2
Hungary (Tatár) 🔨	0	3	1	0	0	2	0	X	6

Team	1	2	3	4	5	6	7	8	Final
Brazil (Melo)	0	0	0	0	1	0	X	X	1
Germany (Kapp) 🔨	2	1	3	4	0	5	X	X	15

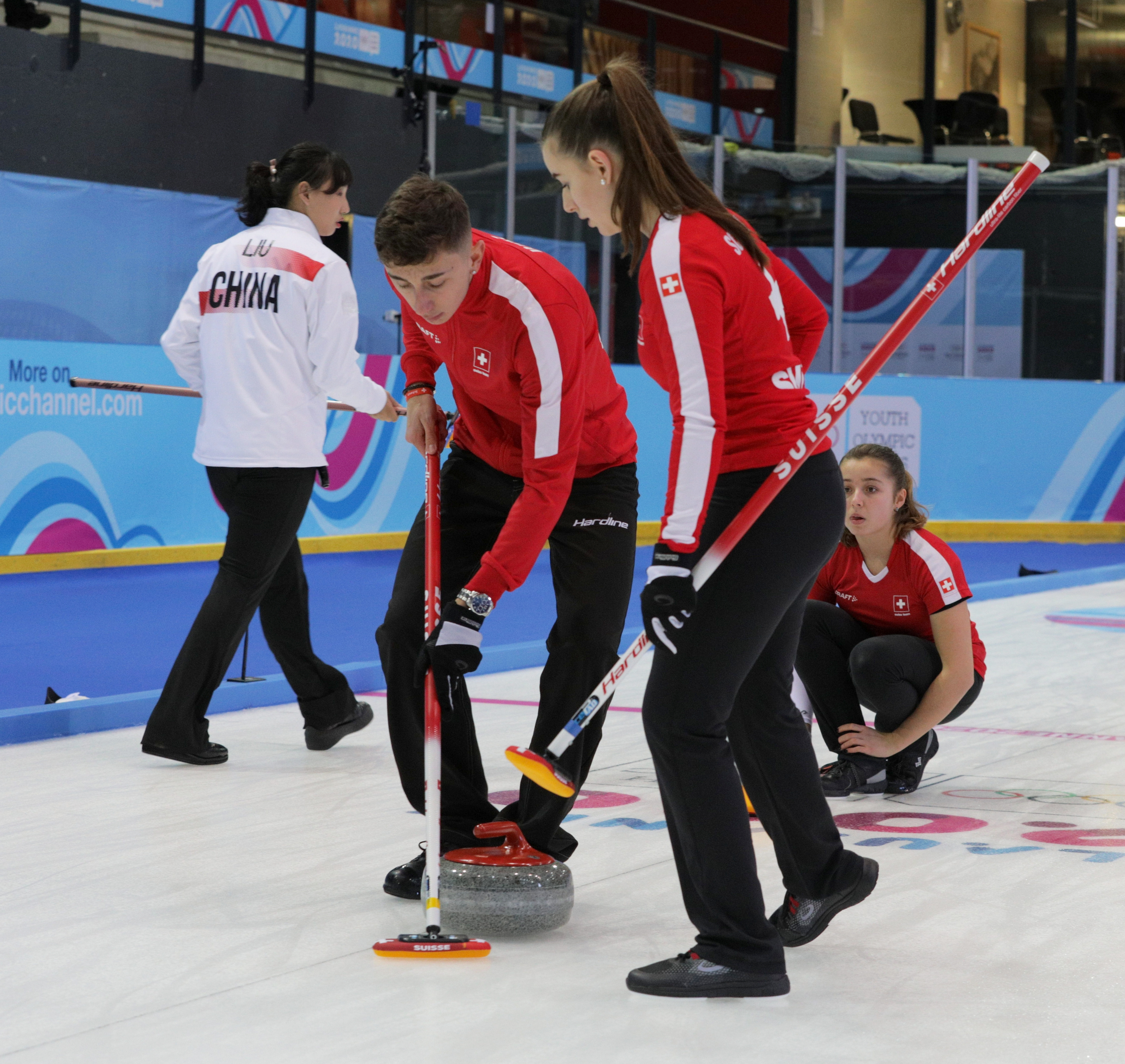
Switzerland vs. China

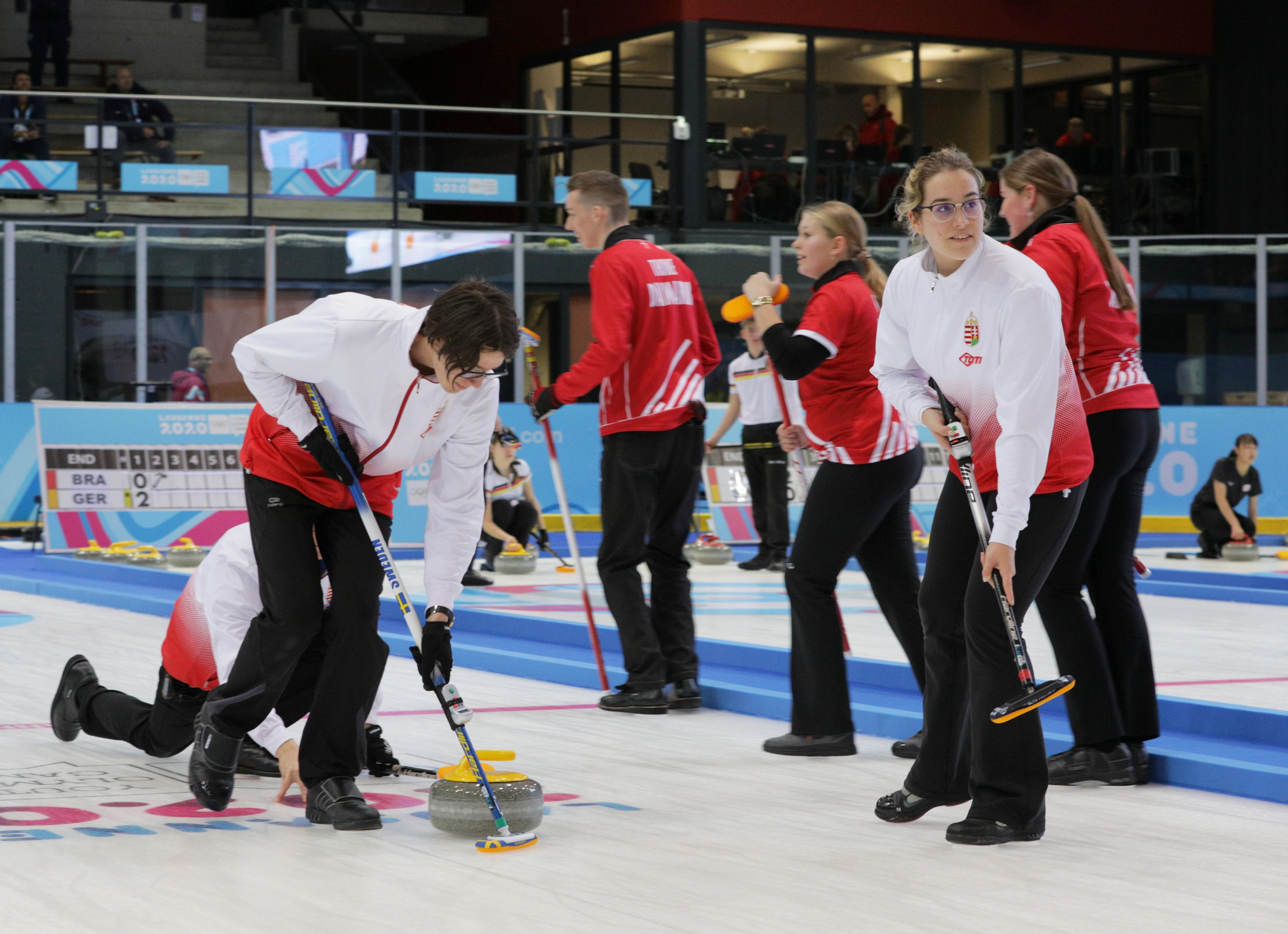
Denmark vs. Hungary

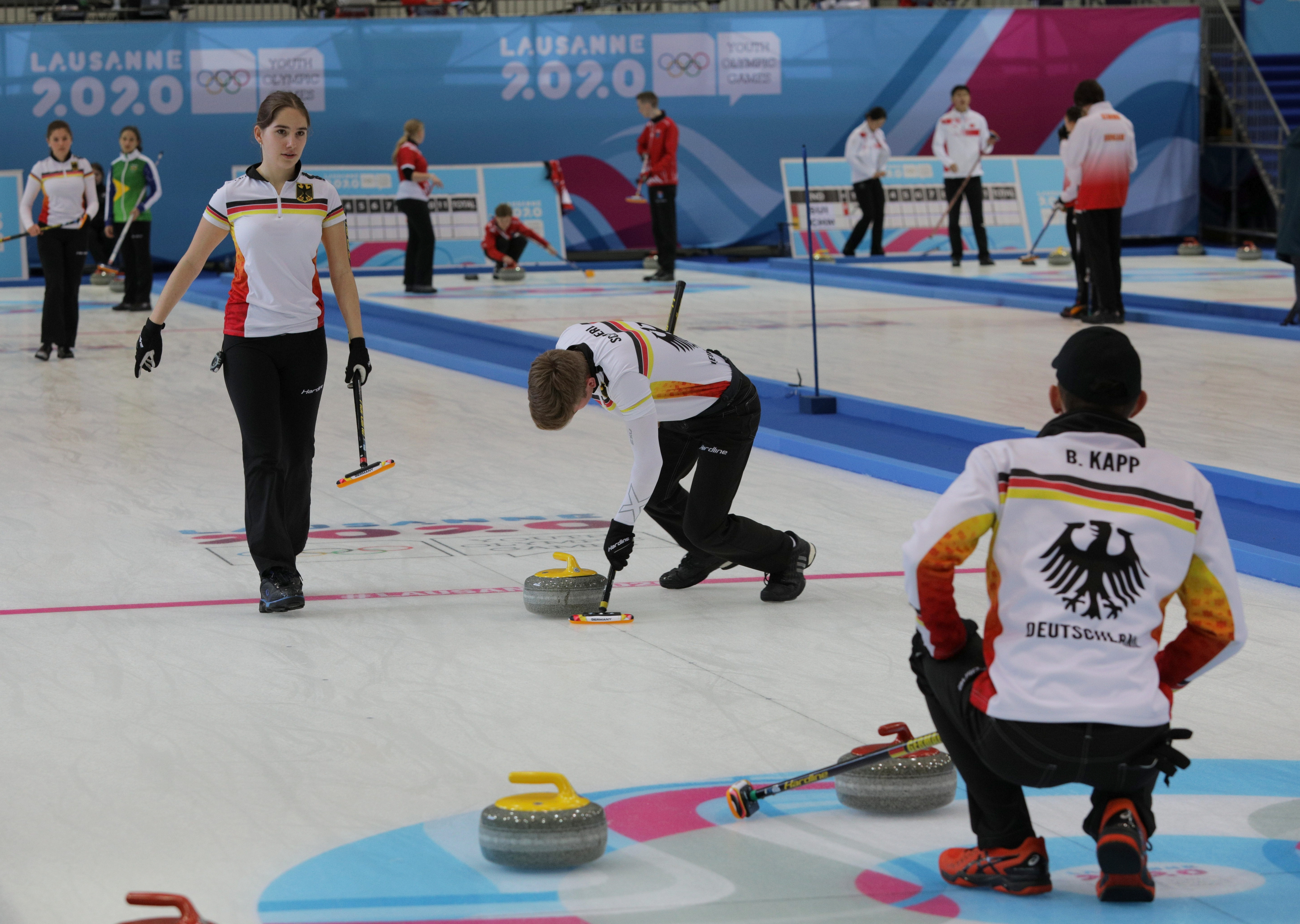
Brazil vs. Germany

==== Saturday, January 11 ====
Draw 5 14:00

Team	1	2	3	4	5	6	7	8	Final
Germany (Kapp) 🔨	2	0	3	0	2	0	1	X	8
Denmark (Vilandt)	0	2	0	1	0	1	0	X	4

Team	1	2	3	4	5	6	7	8	Final
Brazil (Melo)	0	0	0	1	0	0	X	X	1
China (Zhang) 🔨	3	3	3	0	4	1	X	X	14

Team	1	2	3	4	5	6	7	8	Final
Switzerland (Iseli)	0	0	2	0	2	1	3	X	8
Hungary (Tatár) 🔨	0	1	0	1	0	0	0	X	2

==== Sunday, January 12 ====
Draw 7 10:00

Team	1	2	3	4	5	6	7	8	Final
Hungary (Tatár)	0	0	1	0	1	0	0	0	2
China (Zhang) 🔨	0	0	0	2	0	0	0	1	3

Team	1	2	3	4	5	6	7	8	Final
Germany (Kapp)	0	0	0	1	0	1	X	X	2
Switzerland (Iseli) 🔨	0	2	3	0	2	0	X	X	7

Team	1	2	3	4	5	6	7	8	Final
Denmark (Vilandt) 🔨	2	0	2	4	0	4	X	X	12
Brazil (Melo)	0	2	0	0	1	0	X	X	3

==== Monday, January 13 ====
Draw 10 10:00

Team	1	2	3	4	5	6	7	8	Final
Denmark (Vilandt) 🔨	1	0	1	1	0	1	0	0	4
Switzerland (Iseli)	0	3	0	0	2	0	0	1	6

Draw 11 14:00

Team	1	2	3	4	5	6	7	8	Final
Hungary (Tatár) 🔨	3	3	1	0	3	1	2	X	13
Brazil (Melo)	0	0	0	2	0	0	0	X	2

Draw 12 18:00

Team	1	2	3	4	5	6	7	8	Final
Germany (Kapp) 🔨	2	0	2	0	0	0	0	3	7
China (Zhang)	0	2	0	2	1	1	0	0	6

==== Tuesday, January 14 ====
Draw 15 18:00

Team	1	2	3	4	5	6	7	8	Final
Hungary (Tatár)	1	0	0	0	3	0	2	0	6
Germany (Kapp) 🔨	0	2	1	1	0	2	0	2	8

Team	1	2	3	4	5	6	7	8	Final
Switzerland (Iseli) 🔨	1	2	0	5	2	0	X	X	10
Brazil (Melo)	0	0	1	0	0	1	X	X	2

Team	1	2	3	4	5	6	7	8	Final
Denmark (Vilandt)	1	2	0	0	2	4	0	X	9
China (Zhang) 🔨	0	0	1	1	0	0	1	X	3

=== Group C ===
==== Friday, January 10 ====
Draw 2 14:00

Team	1	2	3	4	5	6	7	8	Final
Turkey (Eser)	0	0	0	0	1	0	0	X	1
Norway (Høstmælingen) 🔨	0	3	1	1	0	1	3	X	9

Team	1	2	3	4	5	6	7	8	Final
France (Tuaz) 🔨	1	0	1	0	0	0	3	0	5
Great Britain (Craik)	0	2	0	1	1	4	0	1	9

Team	1	2	3	4	5	6	7	8	Final
New Zealand (Walker) 🔨	1	0	0	2	3	0	2	X	8
Slovenia (Sever)	0	1	0	0	0	3	0	X	4

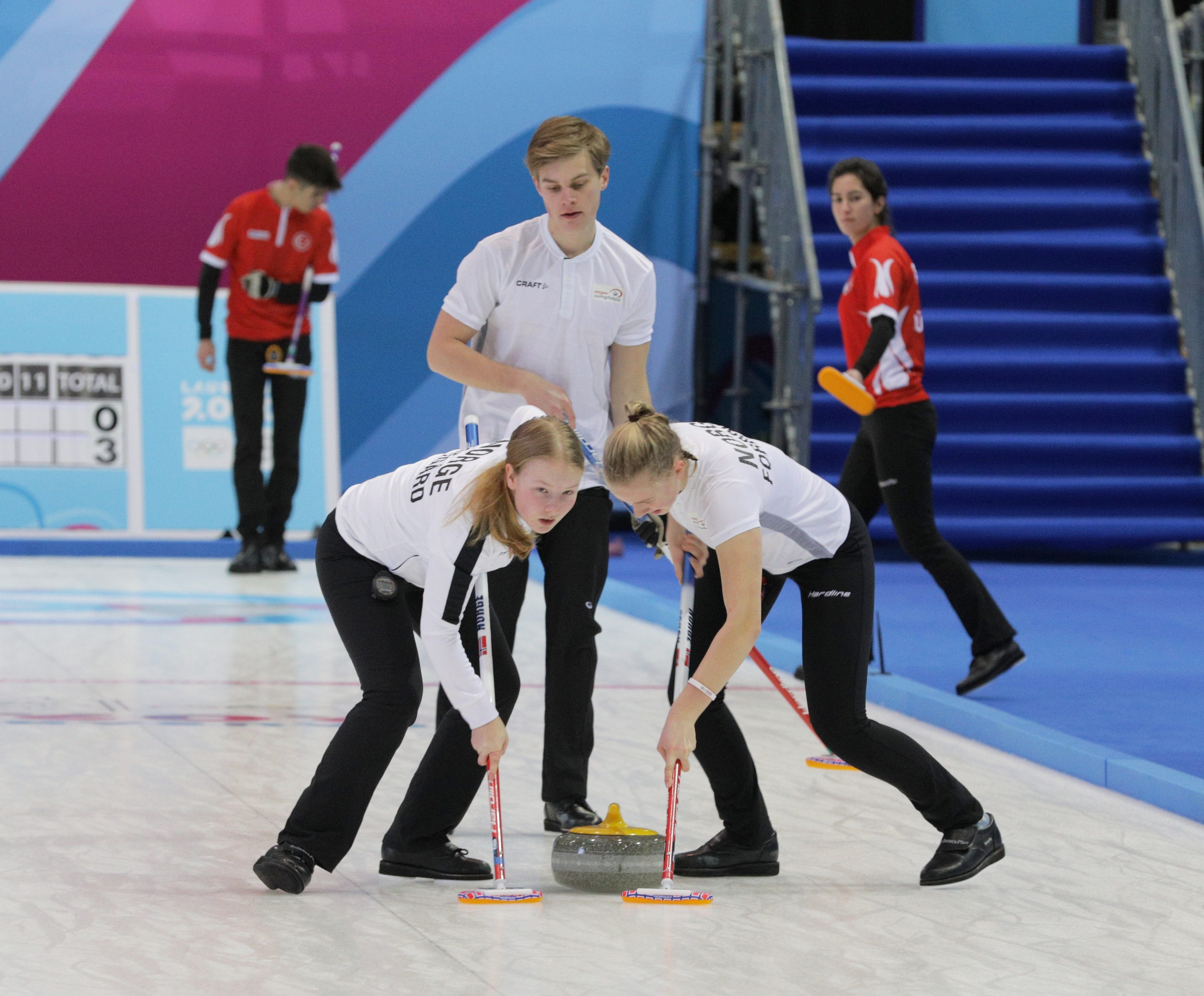
Turkey vs. Norway

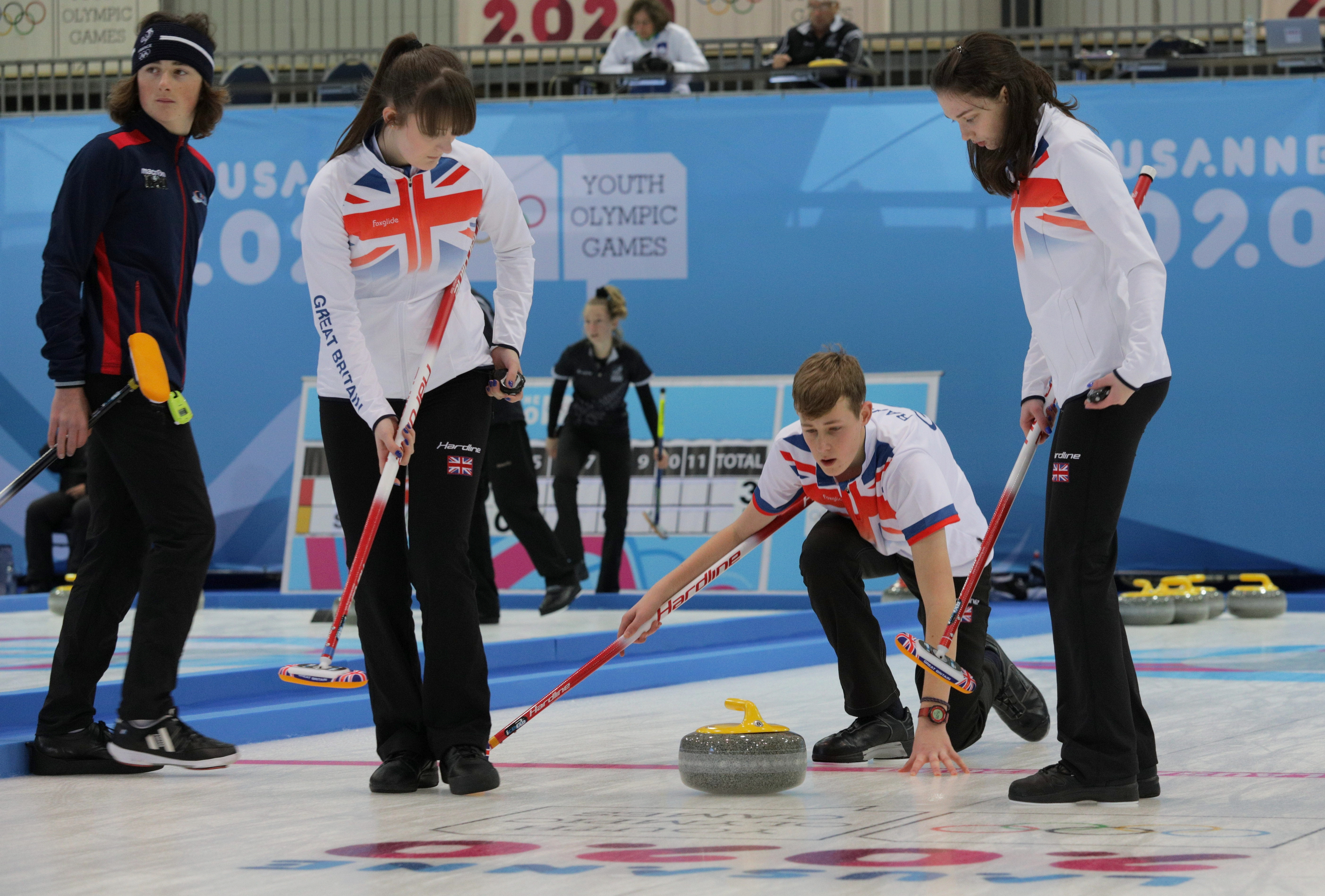
France vs. Great Britain

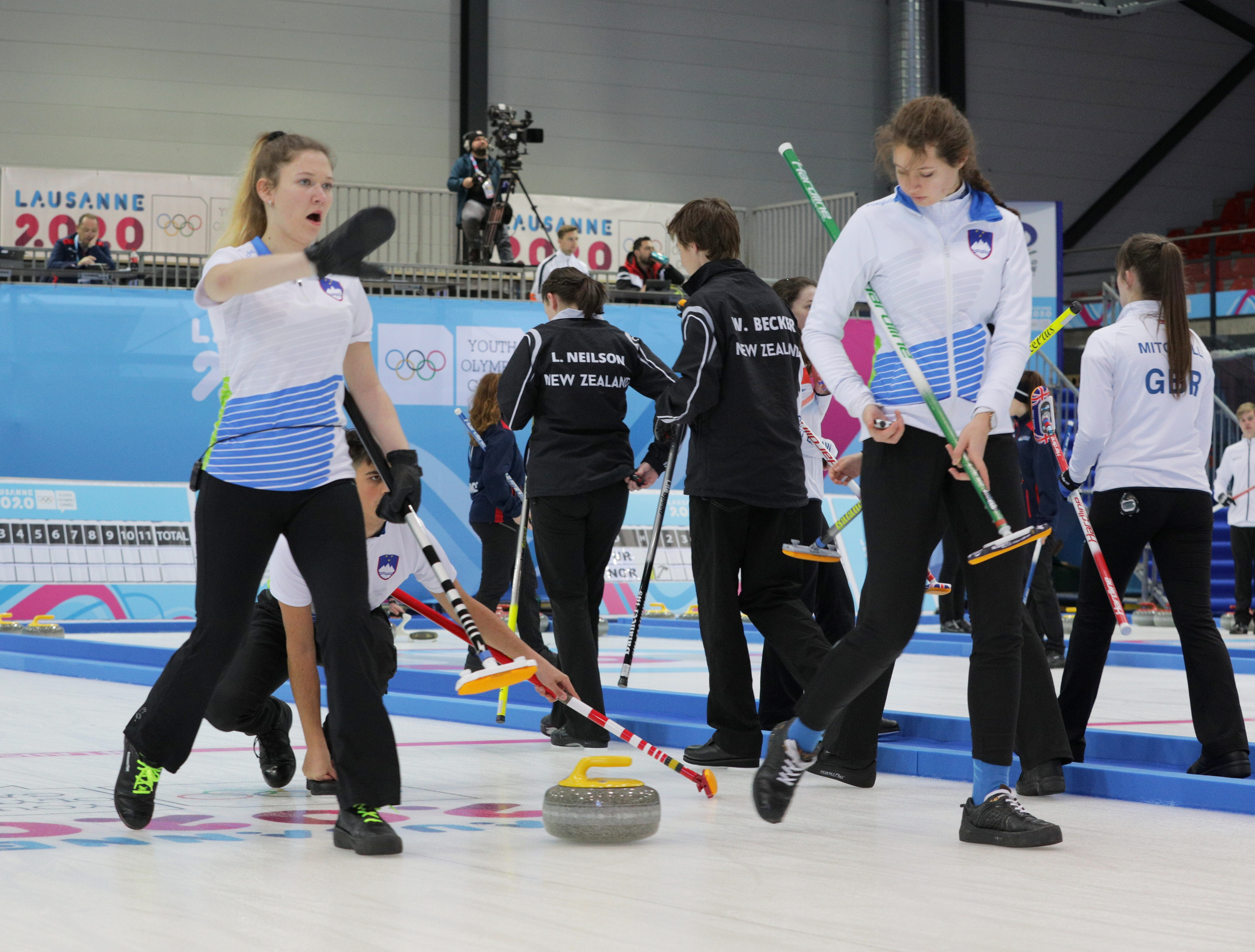
New Zealand vs. Slovenia

==== Saturday, January 11 ====
Draw 4 10:00

Team	1	2	3	4	5	6	7	8	Final
New Zealand (Walker) 🔨	1	0	0	2	1	0	0	2	6
France (Tuaz)	0	1	1	0	0	2	0	0	4

Team	1	2	3	4	5	6	7	8	9	Final
Slovenia (Sever)	0	0	0	2	0	2	1	0	1	6
Norway (Høstmælingen) 🔨	2	0	1	0	1	0	0	1	0	5

Team	1	2	3	4	5	6	7	8	Final
Turkey (Eser) 🔨	0	1	0	1	1	0	2	X	5
Great Britain (Craik)	0	0	1	0	0	0	0	X	1

==== Sunday, January 12 ====
Draw 7 10:00

Team	1	2	3	4	5	6	7	8	Final
Norway (Høstmælingen) 🔨	2	0	0	3	0	2	0	1	8
Great Britain (Craik)	0	1	1	0	1	0	0	0	3

Draw 8 14:00

Team	1	2	3	4	5	6	7	8	Final
New Zealand (Walker)	1	0	1	0	0	2	0	3	7
Turkey (Eser) 🔨	0	2	0	1	2	0	1	0	6

Draw 9 18:00

Team	1	2	3	4	5	6	7	8	Final
France (Tuaz)	0	0	2	0	2	0	3	0	7
Slovenia (Sever) 🔨	1	2	0	2	0	2	0	1	8

==== Monday, January 13 ====
Draw 12 18:00

Team	1	2	3	4	5	6	7	8	Final
France (Tuaz) 🔨	1	0	1	1	2	0	0	1	6
Turkey (Eser)	0	2	0	0	0	1	1	0	4

Team	1	2	3	4	5	6	7	8	Final
Great Britain (Craik) 🔨	1	0	1	0	1	1	2	X	6
Slovenia (Sever)	0	1	0	1	0	0	0	X	2

Team	1	2	3	4	5	6	7	8	9	Final
Norway (Høstmælingen)	0	0	0	1	1	1	0	2	0	5
New Zealand (Walker) 🔨	1	1	1	0	0	0	2	0	1	6

==== Tuesday, January 14 ====
Draw 14 14:00

Team	1	2	3	4	5	6	7	8	Final
Great Britain (Craik) 🔨	3	0	3	0	0	0	1	2	9
New Zealand (Walker)	0	3	0	2	1	1	0	0	7

Team	1	2	3	4	5	6	7	8	Final
Norway (Høstmælingen) 🔨	2	2	0	0	2	0	1	4	11
France (Tuaz)	0	0	2	2	0	2	0	0	6

Team	1	2	3	4	5	6	7	8	Final
Slovenia (Sever)	0	0	1	0	1	0	0	X	2
Turkey (Eser) 🔨	0	1	0	1	0	1	1	X	4

=== Group D ===
==== Friday, January 10 ====
Draw 1 10:00

Team	1	2	3	4	5	6	7	8	Final
United States (Hebert)	0	1	0	0	1	1	0	X	3
Italy (Lo Deserto) 🔨	4	0	1	0	0	0	2	X	7

Draw 2 14:00

Team	1	2	3	4	5	6	7	8	Final
Czech Republic (Chabičovský) 🔨	0	2	1	2	1	1	X	X	7
Latvia (Vonda)	0	0	0	0	0	0	X	X	0

Draw 3 18:00

Team	1	2	3	4	5	6	7	8	Final
Japan (Maeda) 🔨	2	0	2	0	0	0	3	X	7
Sweden (Hallström)	0	1	0	1	0	2	0	X	4

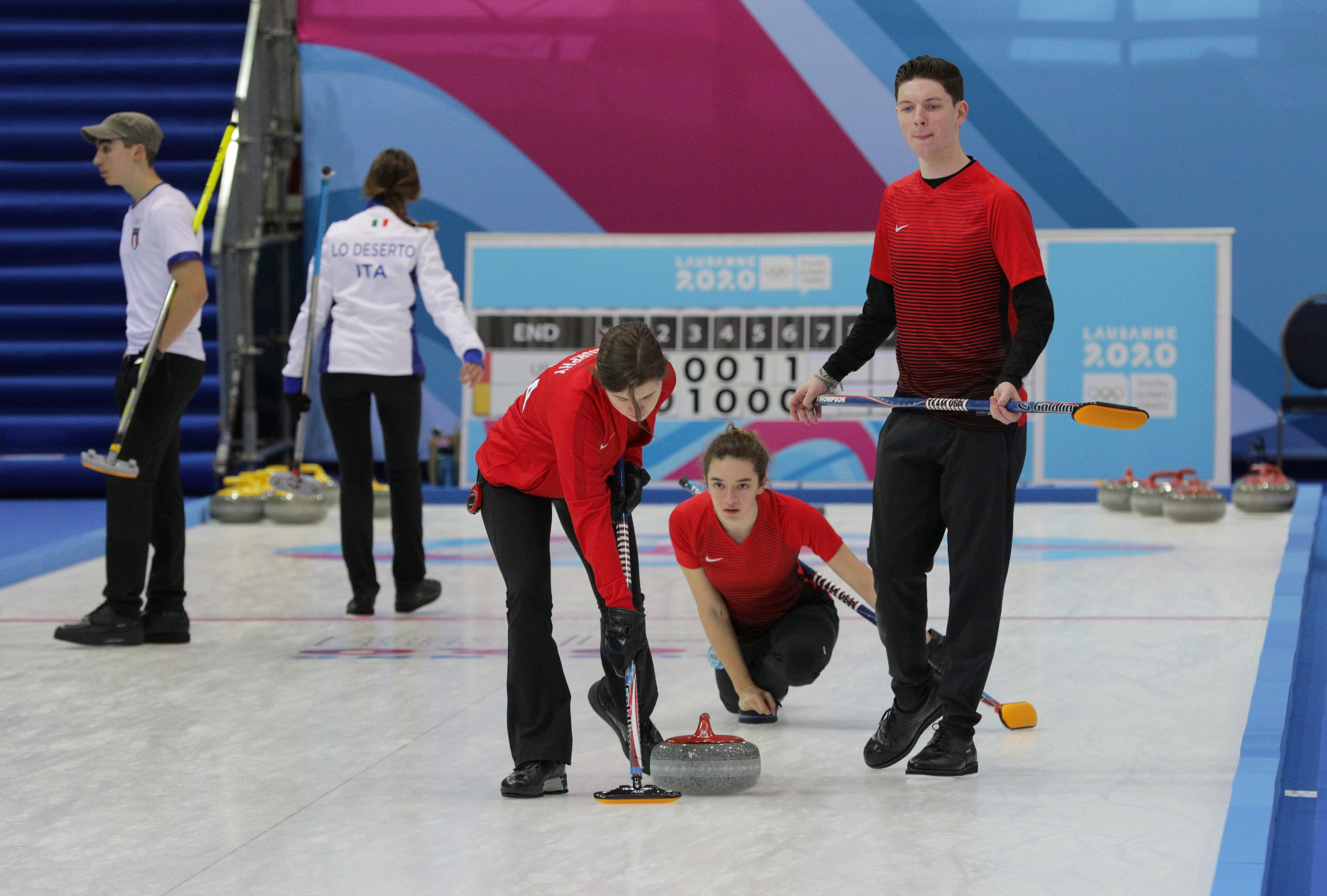
USA vs. Italy

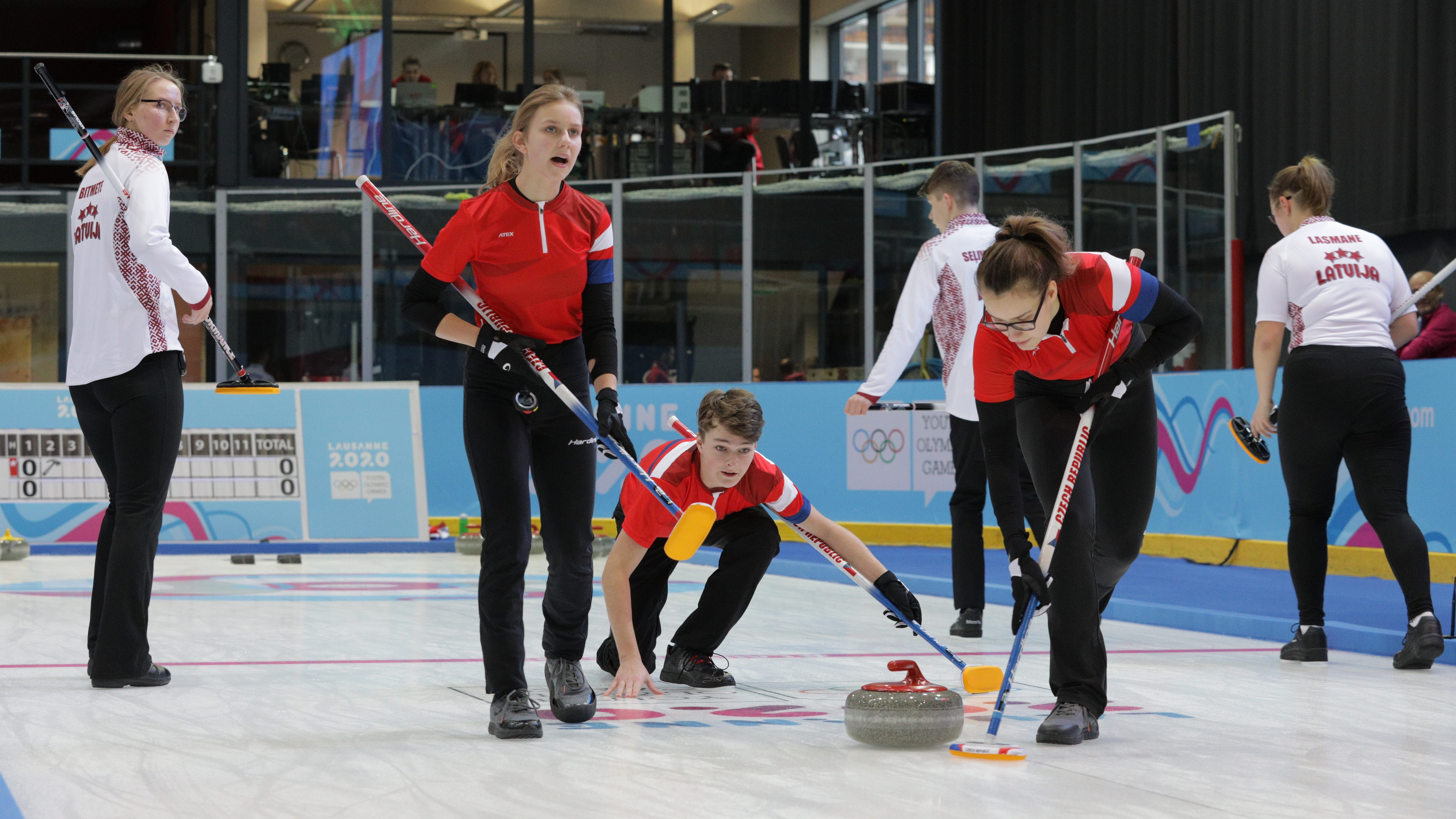
Czech Republic vs. Latvia

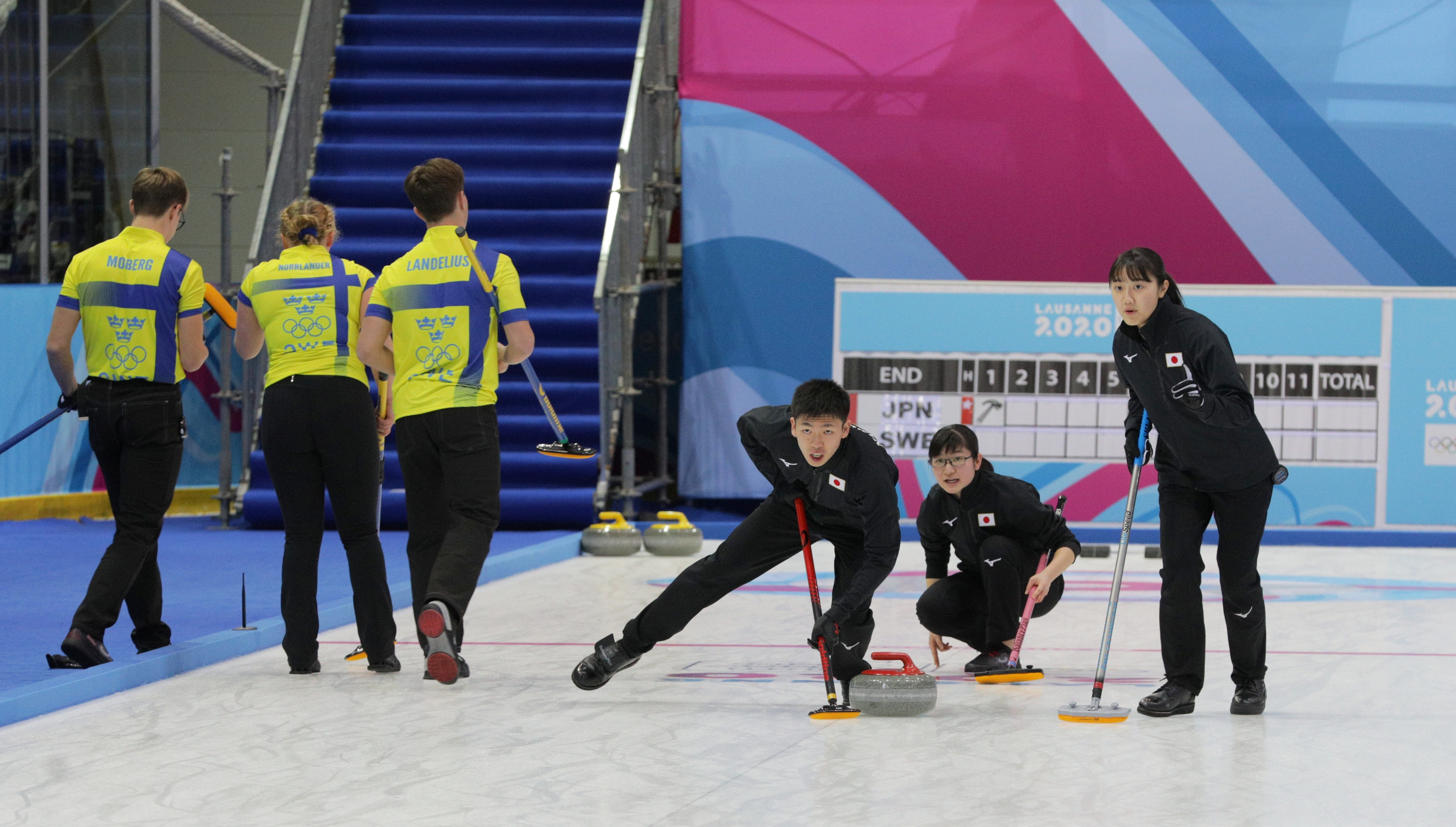
Japan vs. Sweden

==== Saturday, January 11 ====
Draw 6 18:00

Team	1	2	3	4	5	6	7	8	Final
Japan (Maeda) 🔨	0	1	0	4	1	0	2	X	8
Czech Republic (Chabičovský)	0	0	1	0	0	0	0	X	1

Team	1	2	3	4	5	6	7	8	Final
Sweden (Hallström)	0	0	2	1	0	0	0	X	3
Italy (Lo Deserto) 🔨	2	1	0	0	1	1	2	X	7

Team	1	2	3	4	5	6	7	8	Final
United States (Hebert) 🔨	1	1	1	1	2	1	X	X	8
Latvia (Vonda)	0	0	0	0	0	0	X	X	0

==== Sunday, January 12 ====
Draw 8 14:00

Team	1	2	3	4	5	6	7	8	9	Final
Italy (Lo Deserto) 🔨	2	0	1	0	3	0	1	0	3	10
Latvia (Vonda)	0	1	0	1	0	1	0	4	0	7

Team	1	2	3	4	5	6	7	8	Final
United States (Hebert)	0	1	0	0	1	0	X	X	2
Japan (Maeda) 🔨	2	0	0	6	0	0	X	X	8

Team	1	2	3	4	5	6	7	8	Final
Czech Republic (Chabičovský)	0	0	1	0	1	0	0	X	2
Sweden (Hallström) 🔨	1	1	0	1	0	3	2	X	8

==== Monday, January 13 ====
Draw 10 10:00

Team	1	2	3	4	5	6	7	8	Final
Czech Republic (Chabičovský) 🔨	2	0	0	0	2	0	2	0	6
United States (Hebert)	0	2	0	0	0	1	0	1	4

Team	1	2	3	4	5	6	7	8	Final
Latvia (Vonda) 🔨	1	0	0	0	3	3	0	0	7
Sweden (Hallström)	0	0	2	1	0	0	2	4	9

Team	1	2	3	4	5	6	7	8	9	Final
Japan (Maeda)	0	2	0	2	0	0	0	2	0	6
Italy (Lo Deserto) 🔨	2	0	1	0	2	1	0	0	1	7

==== Tuesday, January 14 ====
Draw 13 10:00

Team	1	2	3	4	5	6	7	8	Final
Latvia (Vonda)	0	2	0	0	2	0	X	X	4
Japan (Maeda) 🔨	2	0	2	3	0	2	X	X	9

Draw 14 14:00

Team	1	2	3	4	5	6	7	8	Final
Sweden (Hallström)	0	2	2	2	0	0	2	X	8
United States (Hebert) 🔨	1	0	0	0	1	1	0	X	3

Draw 15 18:00

Team	1	2	3	4	5	6	7	8	Final
Italy (Lo Deserto)	0	0	0	0	1	0	1	X	2
Czech Republic (Chabičovský) 🔨	3	0	1	1	0	1	0	X	6

== Playoffs ==
Quarterfinals
A1	Canada	4
D2	Japan	5
C1	New Zealand	7
B2	Germany	4
B1	Switzerland	5
A2	Russia	7
D1	Italy	6
C2	Norway	8

Semifinals
D2	Japan	8
C1	New Zealand	4
A2	Russia	2
C2	Norway	7

Gold Medal Game
D2	Japan	4
C2	Norway	5
Bronze Medal Game
C1	New Zealand	5
A2	Russia	9

=== Quarterfinals ===
Wednesday, January 15, 10:00

Sheet A	1	2	3	4	5	6	7	8	9	Final
Canada (Young)	1	0	0	0	1	0	2	0	0	4
Japan (Maeda) 🔨	0	0	0	2	0	1	0	1	1	5

Sheet B	1	2	3	4	5	6	7	8	Final
Germany (Kapp)	0	1	0	1	2	0	0	0	4
New Zealand (Walker) 🔨	3	0	1	0	0	1	1	1	7

Sheet C	1	2	3	4	5	6	7	8	Final
Russia (Denisenko)	0	0	2	0	1	0	2	2	7
Switzerland (Iseli) 🔨	1	1	0	2	0	1	0	0	5

Sheet D	1	2	3	4	5	6	7	8	Final
Norway (Høstmælingen) 🔨	1	2	2	0	0	0	0	3	8
Italy (Lo Deserto)	0	0	0	2	2	1	1	0	6

=== Semifinals ===
Wednesday, January 15, 14:00

Sheet C	1	2	3	4	5	6	7	8	Final
Japan (Maeda)	0	2	1	0	4	0	1	X	8
New Zealand (Walker) 🔨	1	0	0	1	0	2	0	X	4

Sheet A	1	2	3	4	5	6	7	8	Final
Russia (Denisenko)	0	0	1	0	0	1	0	X	2
Norway (Høstmælingen) 🔨	0	2	0	1	1	0	3	X	7

=== Bronze medal game ===
Thursday, January 16, 12:00

Sheet D	1	2	3	4	5	6	7	8	Final
Russia (Denisenko) 🔨	3	3	0	2	0	1	0	X	9
New Zealand (Walker)	0	0	2	0	2	0	1	X	5

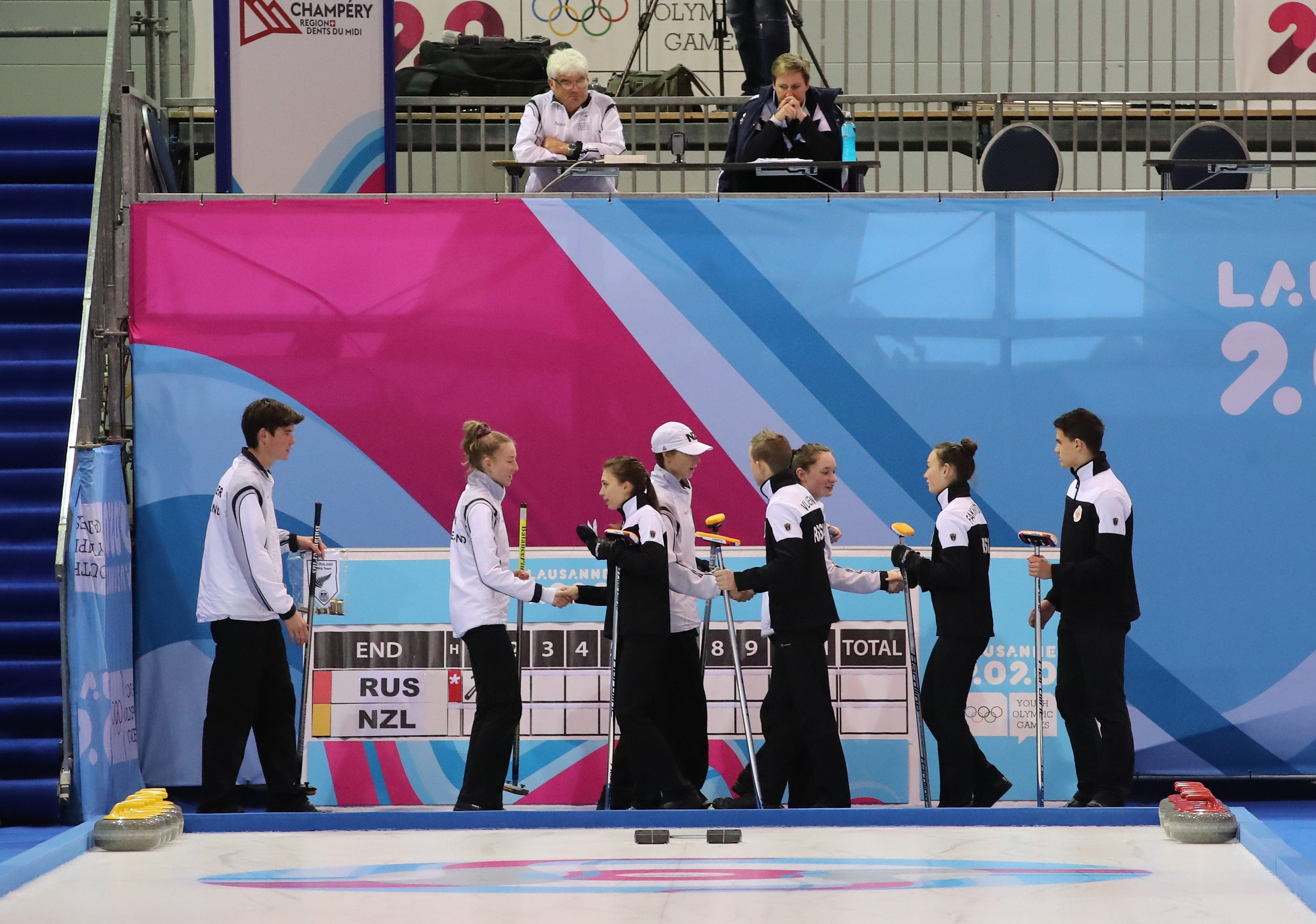
Handshake of Team Russia and Team New Zealand while their coaches watch it from above

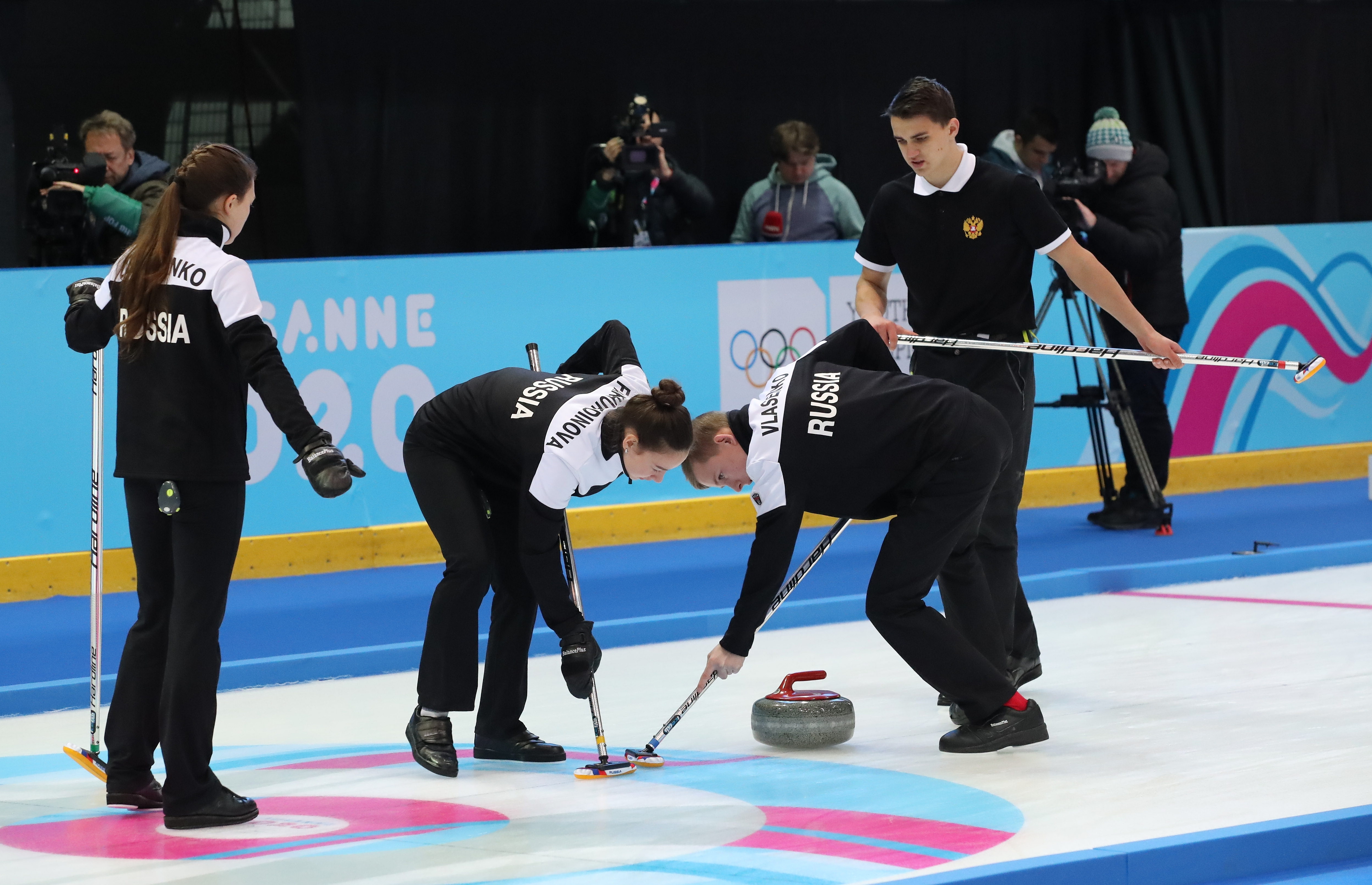
Team Russia

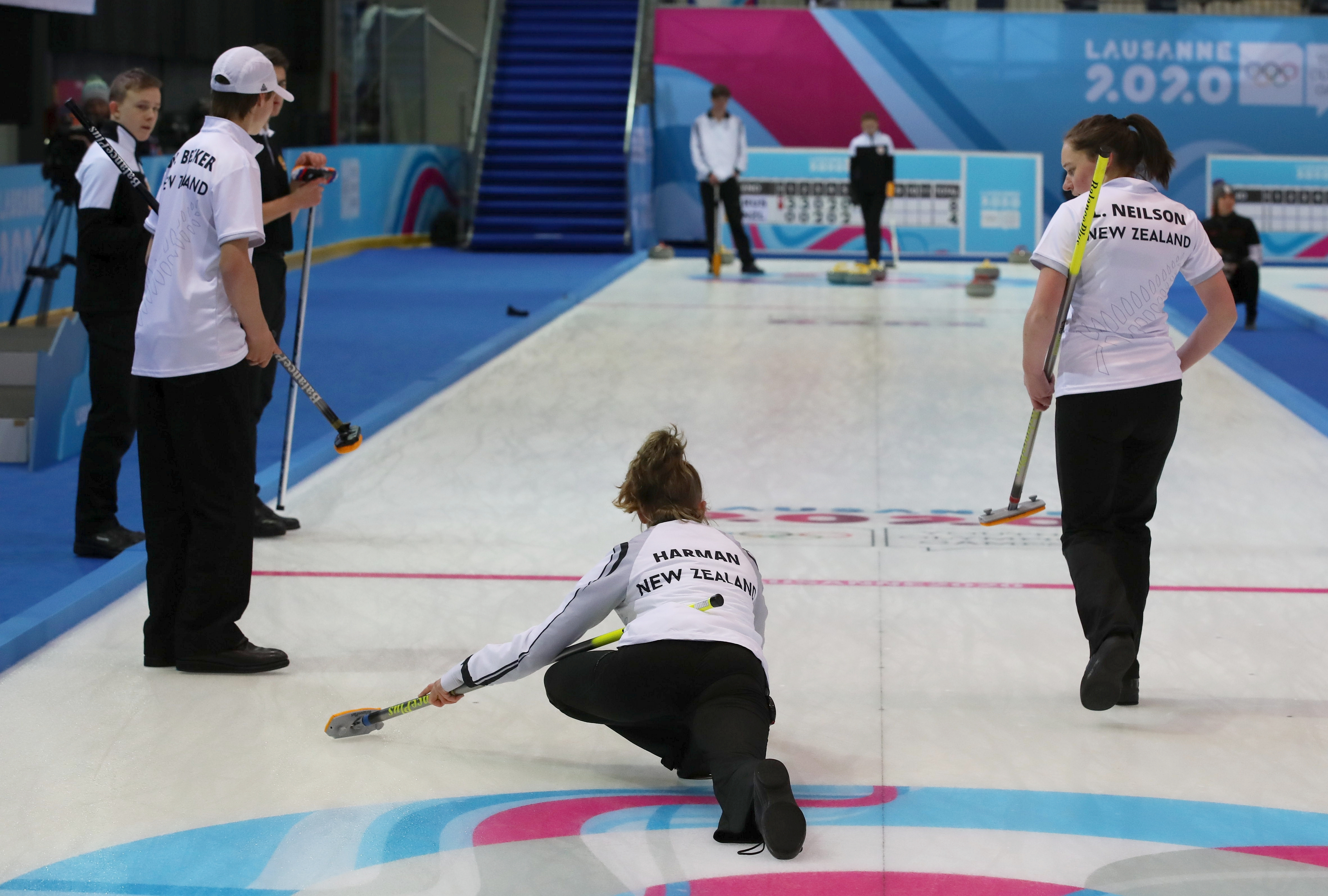
Team New Zealand

=== Gold medal game ===
Thursday, January 16, 12:00

Sheet B	1	2	3	4	5	6	7	8	9	Final
Japan (Maeda)	0	0	0	0	1	1	0	2	0	4
Norway (Høstmælingen) 🔨	0	1	0	1	0	0	2	0	1	5

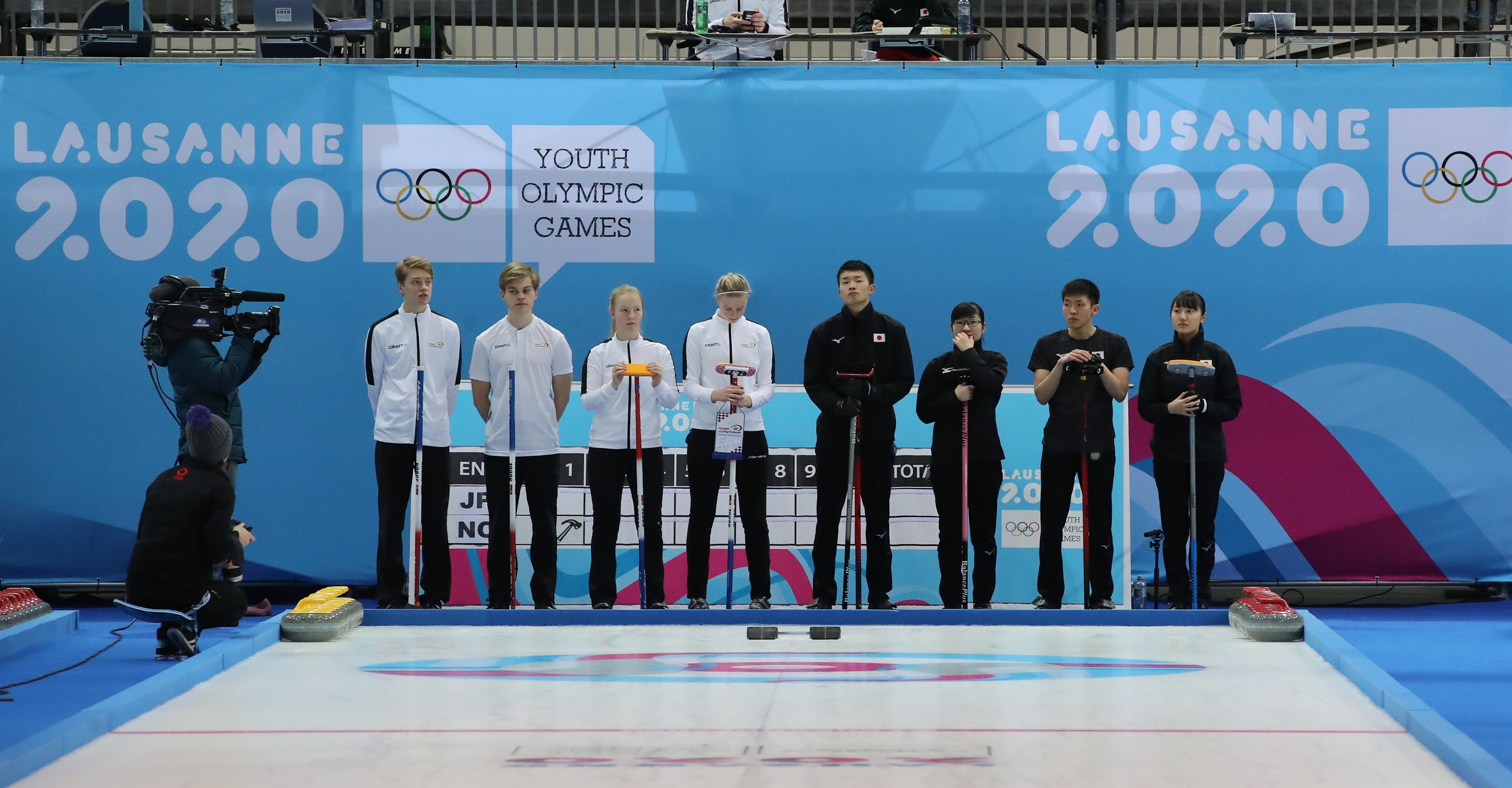
Teams Japan and Norway before the game starts

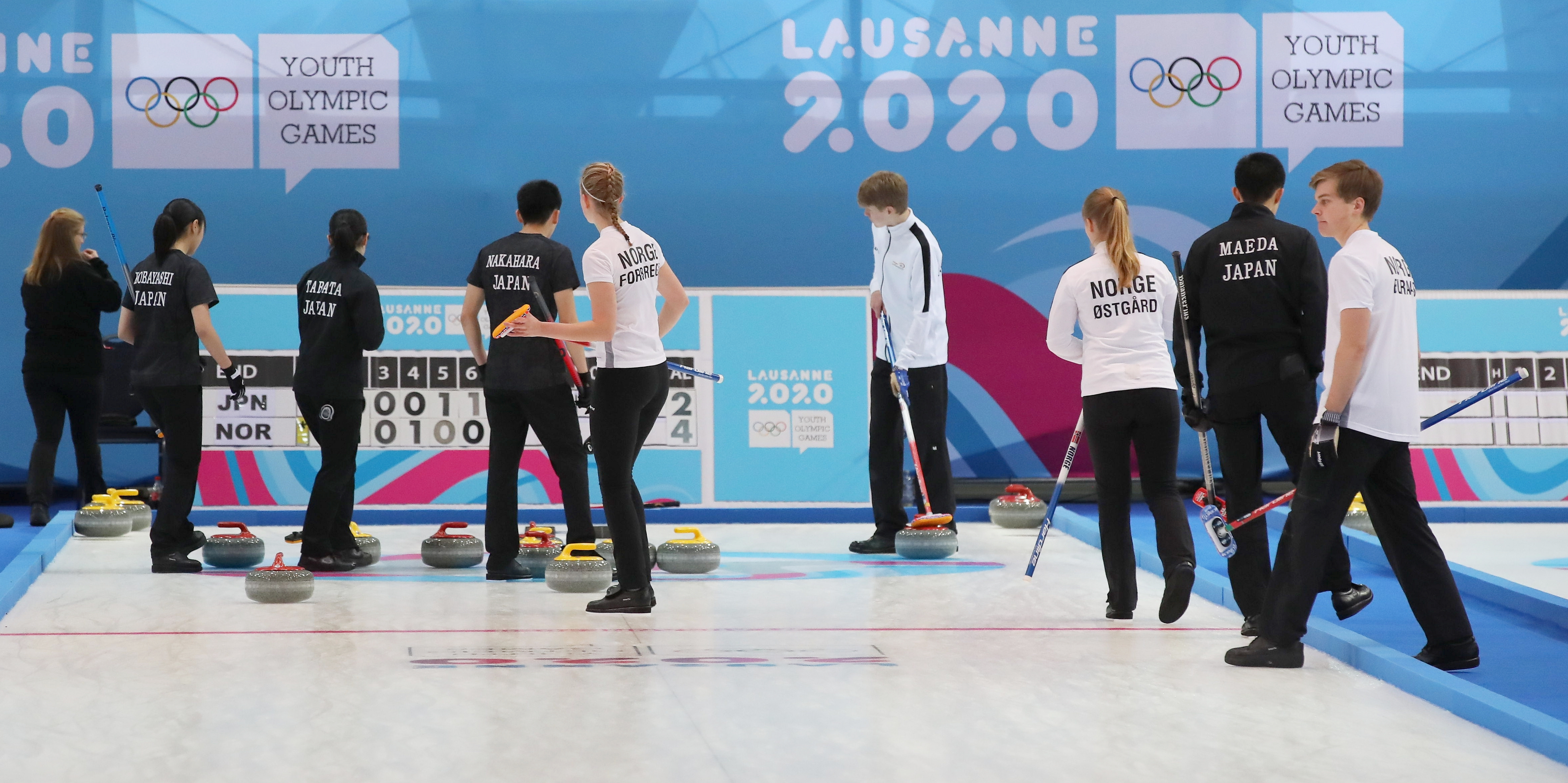
Both teams during the game

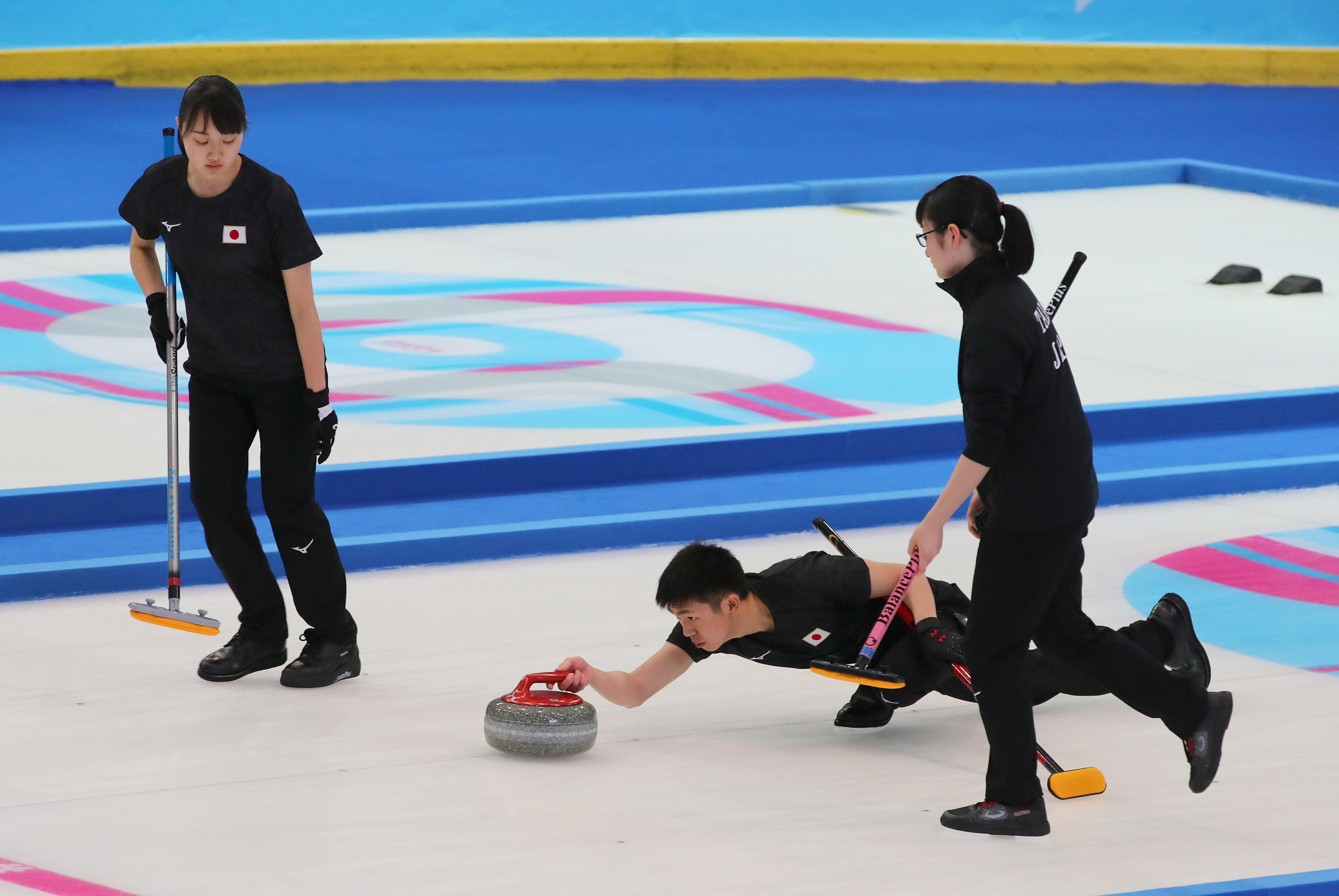
Team Japan during the game

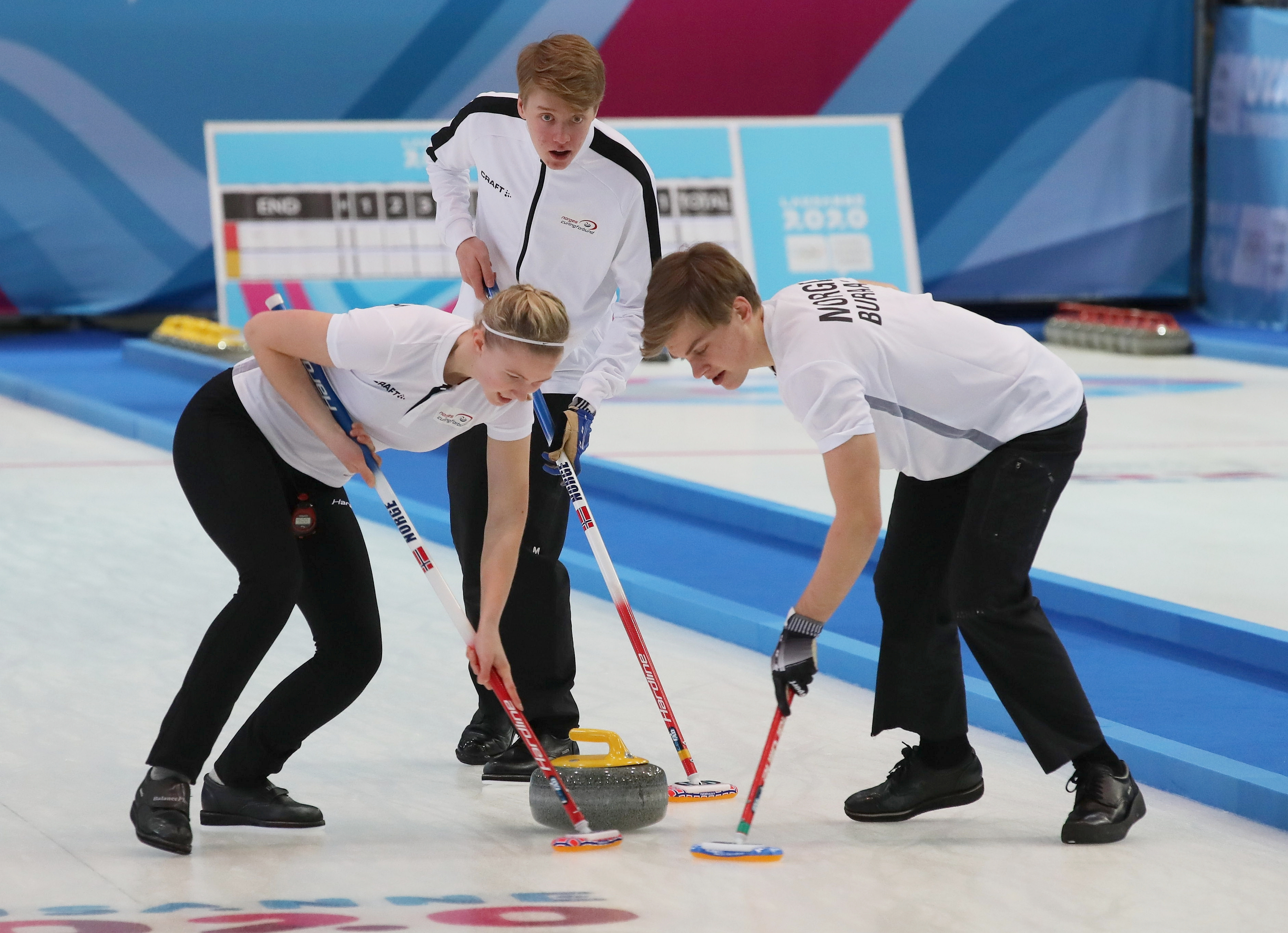
Team Norway during the game

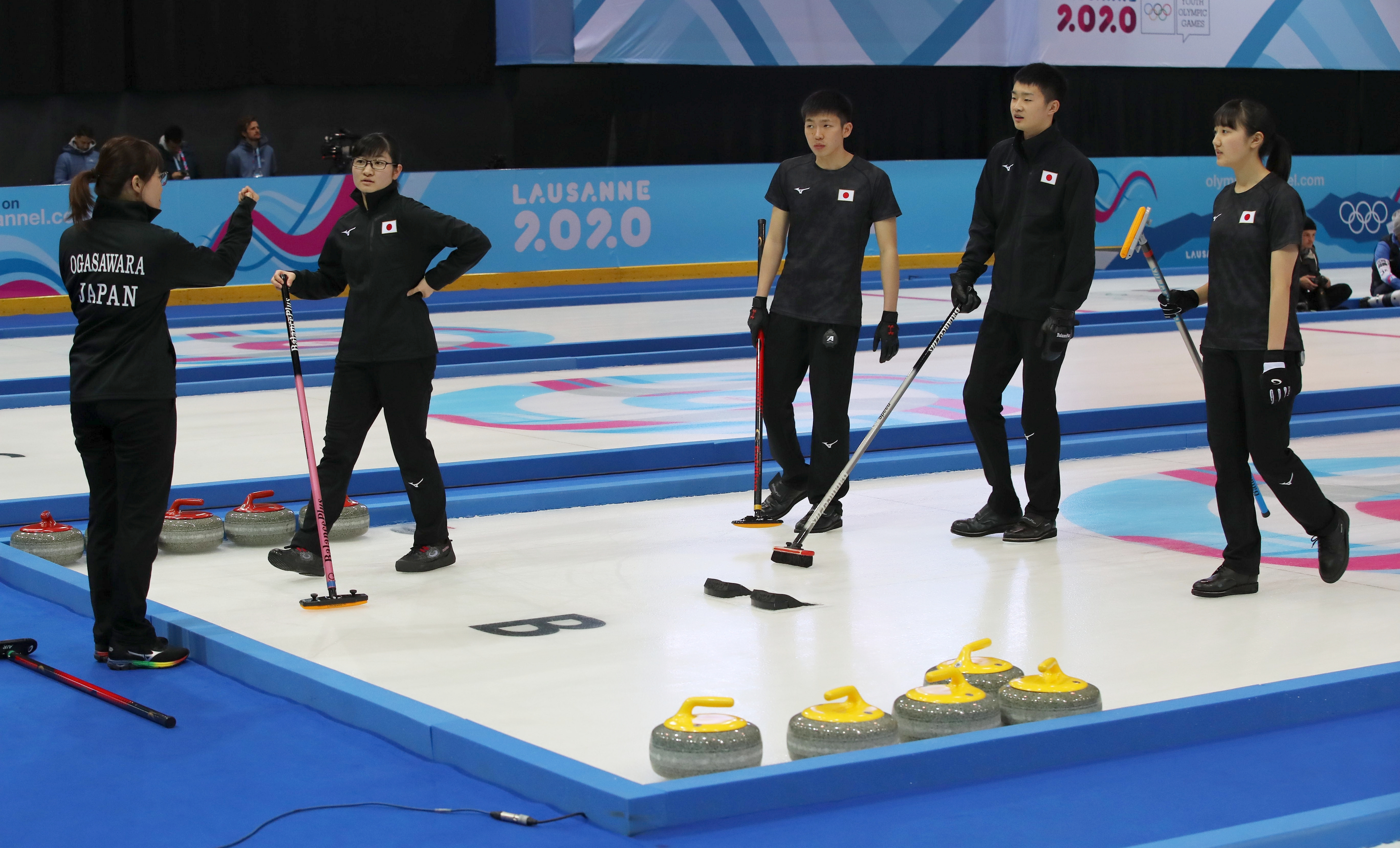
Team Japan discusses the last stone in the last end

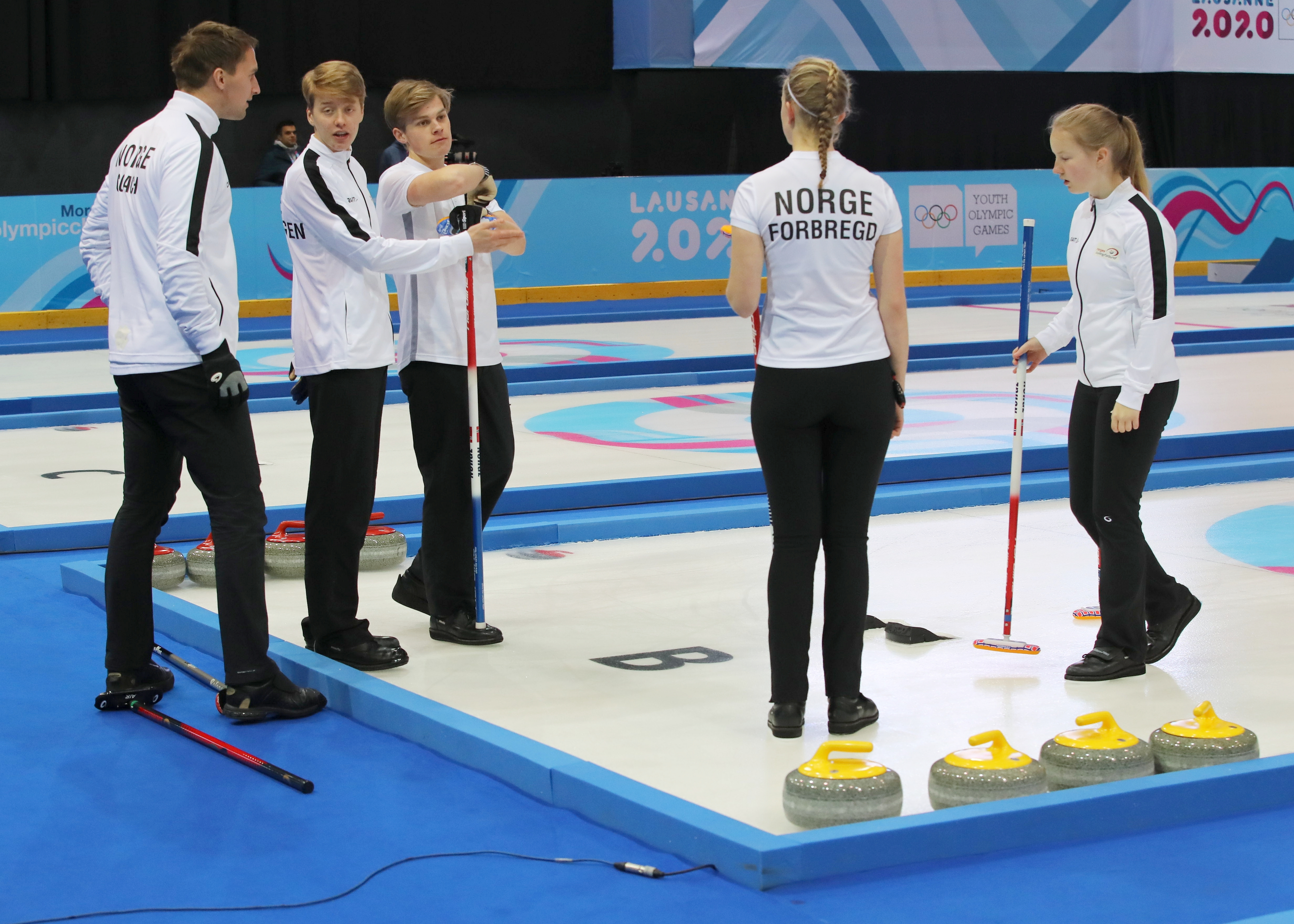
Team Norway discusses the last stone in the last end

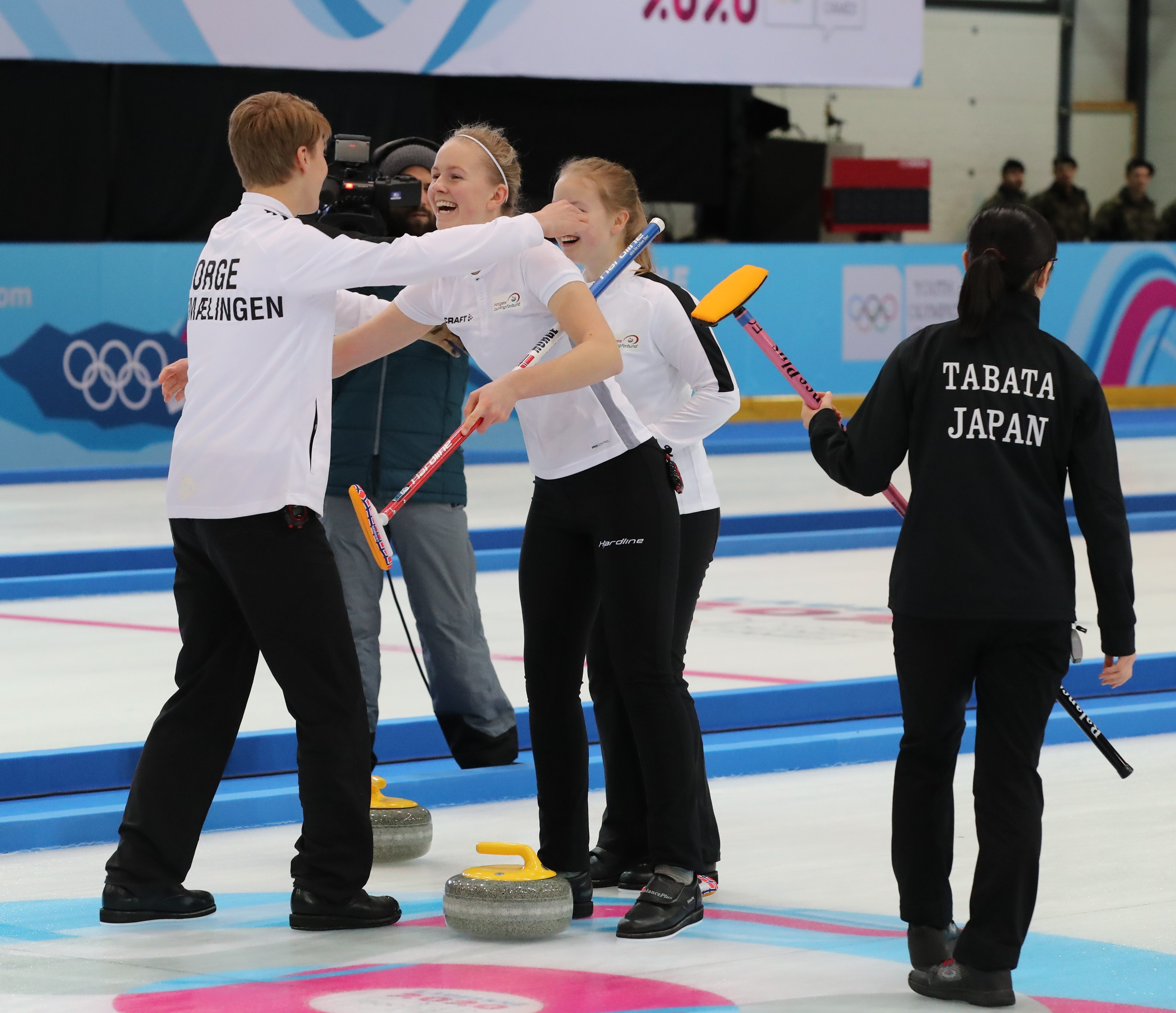
Team Norway celebrates the victory

== Final standings ==
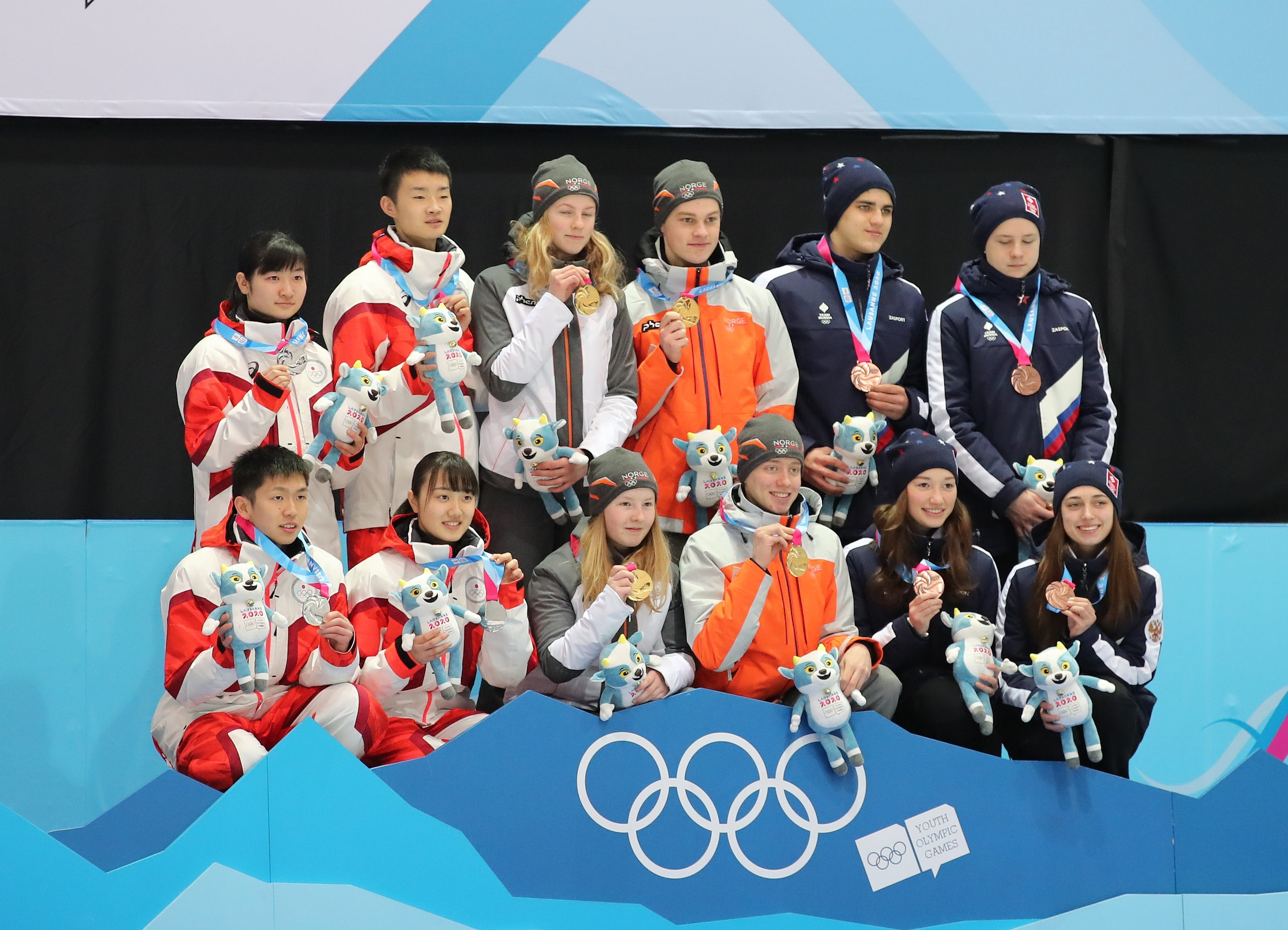
Medal Ceremony (from left to right): Japan, Norway, Russia

The final standings were as follows:

Place	Team
1st place, gold medalist(s)	Norway
2nd place, silver medalist(s)	Japan
3rd place, bronze medalist(s)	Russia
4	New Zealand
5	Italy
6	Switzerland
7	Canada
8	Germany
9	China
10	Sweden
11	Great Britain
12	South Korea

Place	Team
13	Denmark
14	Czech Republic
15	Poland
16	Turkey
17	Hungary
18	Spain
19	United States
20	Slovenia
21	Estonia
22	Latvia
23	France
24	Brazil
