= Speed skating at the 2020 Winter Youth Olympics =

Speed skating at the III Winter Youth Olympic Games
- Venue: Lake St. Moritz
- Dates: 12–16 January
- Competitors: 64 from 22 nations

Speed skating at the 2020 Winter Youth Olympics took place at Lake St. Moritz in St. Moritz, Switzerland from 12 to 16 January 2020.

Unique to the Youth Olympic Games is a mixed NOC team sprint competition.

== Medal summary ==
=== Medal table ===
Rank	Nation	Gold	Silver	Bronze	Total
1	Japan	3	1	1	5
2	Netherlands	2	0	0	2
3	China	1	1	2	4
–	Mixed-NOCs	1	1	1	3
4	Russia	0	1	1	2
5	Colombia	0	1	0	1
5	Czech Republic	0	1	0	1
5	Spain	0	1	0	1
8	Italy	0	0	1	1
8	United States	0	0	1	1
Totals (9 entries)		7	7	7	21

=== Boys' events ===
Event	Gold		Silver		Bronze	
500 metres	Yudai Yamamoto; Japan	36.42	Nil Llop; Spain	36.60	Xue Zhiwen; China	36.67
1500 metres	Motonaga Arito; Japan	1:52.24	Pavel Taran; Russia	1:53.74	Jonathan Tobon; United States	1:55.67
Mass start	Motonaga Arito; Japan	30 pts	Diego Amaya; Colombia	20 pts	Pavel Taran; Russia	10 pts

=== Girls' events ===
Event	Gold		Silver		Bronze	
500 metres	Isabel Grevelt; Netherlands	40.57	Wang Jingyi; China	41.07	Yukino Yoshida; Japan	41.16
1500 metres	Myrthe de Boer; Netherlands	2:10.44	Yuka Takahashi; Japan	2:10.58	Yang Binyu; China	2:10.93
Mass start	Yang Binyu; China	30 pts	Zuzana Kuršová; Czech Republic	25 pts	Katia Filippi; Italy	10 pts

=== Mixed event ===
Event	Gold		Silver		Bronze	
Team sprint	Team 3 (MIX); Sini Siro (FIN); Yukino Yoshida (JPN); Ignaz Gschwentner (AUT); Alexander Sergeev (RUS)	2:04.10	Team 16 (MIX); Laura Kivioja (FIN); Daria Kopacz (POL); Theo Collins (GBR); Motonaga Arito (JPN)	2:05.92	Team 14 (MIX); Ramona Ionel (ROU); Valeriia Sorokoletova (RUS); Tuukka Suomalainen (FIN); Jonathan Tobon (USA)	2:05.96

== Qualification system ==
The overall quota for the Speed skating competition is 64 total skaters, consisting of 32 men and 32 ladies. Each National Olympic Committee (NOC) could send a maximum of six athletes (three per gender) to the Winter Youth Olympic Games but the maximum number of entries per event is two. Skaters are eligible to participate at the 2020 Winter Youth Olympics if they were born between 1 January 2002 and 31 December 2004.

The top six athletes, per gender, based on the results of the 2019 World Junior Speed Skating Championships in the 500 and 1500 meters entitled to one quota. Each NOC can receive up to two quotas based on the 2019 World Junior Championships. The remaining quota will be allocated based on the ISU Junior World Cup Speed Skating ranking. The allocation of quotas will be carried out under four restrictions:

1. the allocation will be disregarded the highest ranked NOC skaters in equal number to the quota the NOCs have already received.
2. only the highest distance rank of each skater will be considered.
3. NOC that did not qualify or qualified one quota will get priority before allocation of a third quota to other NOC.
4. The host nation has the right to enter one athlete in each event if not qualified.

=== Qualification summary ===
NOC	Boys'	Girls'	Total
Austria	1		1
Belgium		1	1
Belarus	2	2	4
China	2	2	4
Colombia	1		1
Czech Republic	2	2	4
Finland	2	2	4
Germany	2	2	4
Great Britain	1		1
Hungary		1	1
Italy	1	2	3
Japan	2	2	4
Kazakhstan	2	2	4
Netherlands	2	2	4
Norway	2	2	4
Poland	2	2	4
Romania		2	2
Russia	2	2	4
South Korea	2	2	4
Spain	1	2	3
Switzerland	1		1
United States	2		2
Total: 22 NOCs	32	32	64

=== Quota allocation ===
Based on the results of the 2019 World Junior Speed Skating Championships the following countries have earned YOG quota places. The final allocation of quotas was announced by the ISU on November 29, 2019.

Event	Athletes per NOC	Boys'	Girls'
Host nation	1	Switzerland	~~Switzerland~~
2019 World Junior Championships	2	Japan; Russia; South Korea	Netherlands; Japan
2019 World Junior Championships	1	Austria; China; Germany; Italy; Netherlands	South Korea; Norway; Poland; Russia
ISU Junior World Cup Speed Skating ranking	2	Belarus; Kazakhstan; Norway; Poland; United States	Belarus; China; Czech Republic; Germany; Italy; Kazakhstan; Spain
ISU Junior World Cup Speed Skating ranking	1	~~Austria~~; ~~Belgium~~; China; Colombia; Czech Republic; Finland; Germany; Great Britain; Netherlands; Spain	~~Austria~~; ~~Canada~~; Finland; ~~Ireland~~; Norway; Poland; Romania; Russia; South Korea
Reallocation	1	Czech Republic; Finland	Hungary; Romania; Finland; Belgium
Total		32	32
