= Ice hockey at the 2020 Winter Youth Olympics – Boys' 3x3 mixed tournament =

2020 Winter Youth Olympics – Boys' 3x3 mixed tournament
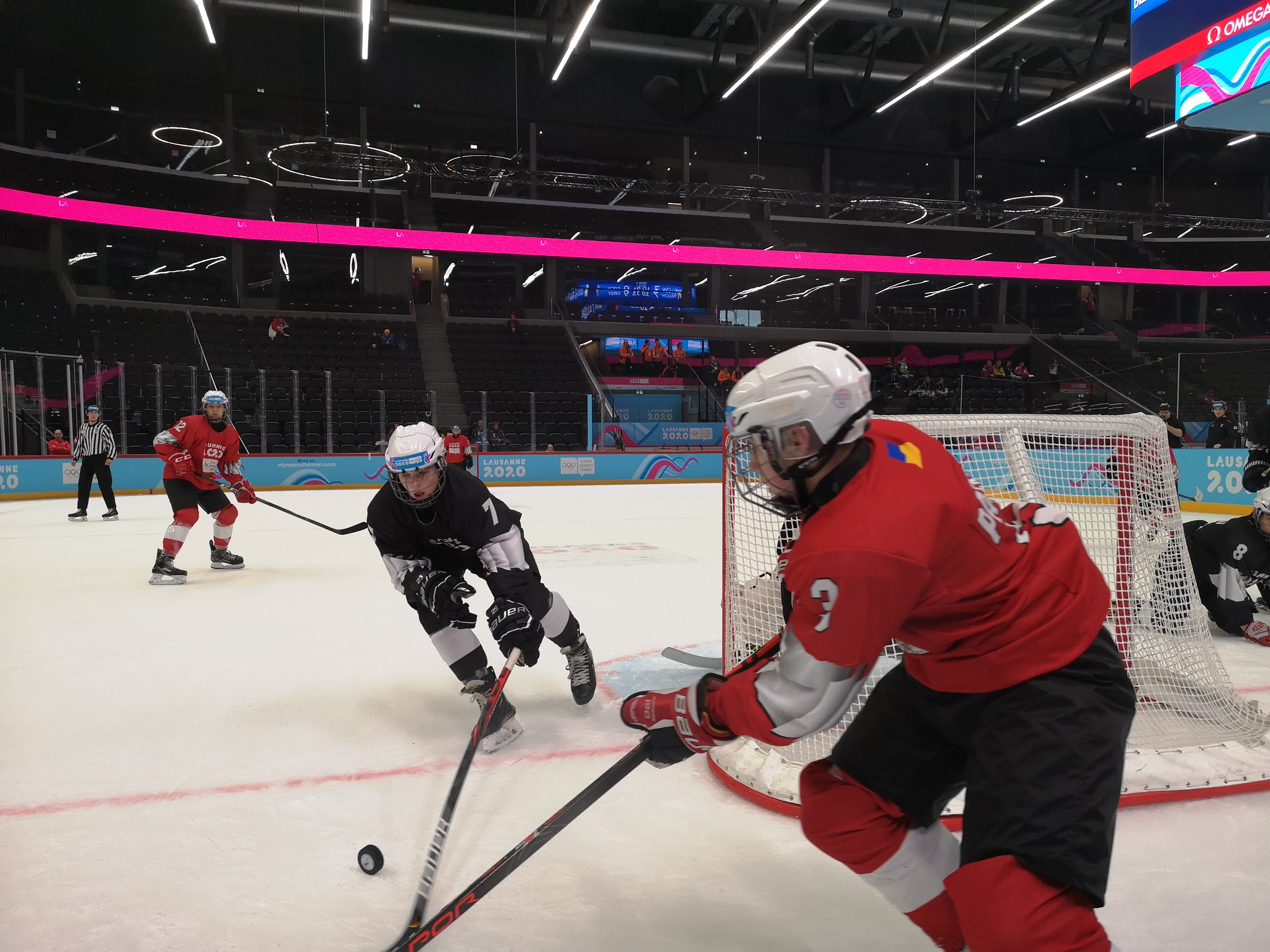

Tournament details
- Host country: Switzerland
- Venue(s): 1 (in 1 host city)
- Dates: 10–15 January
- Teams: 8

Final positions
- Champions: Team Green (MIX)
- Runners-up: Team Red (MIX)
- Third place: Team Brown (MIX)

Tournament statistics
- Games played: 32

The boys' 3x3 mixed ice hockey tournament at the 2020 Winter Youth Olympics was held from 10 to 15 January at the Vaudoise Aréna in Lausanne, Switzerland.

== Teams ==
No	Pos	Team Black	Team Blue	Team Brown	Team Green
2	P	Junior Espósito (ARG)	Chen Chih-yuan (TPE)	Luka Banek (CRO)	Nicolas Elgas (LUX)
3	P	Lukas Floriantschitz (AUT)	Jakub Trzebunia (POL)	Sai Lake (AUS)	Artyom Pronichkin (RUS)
4	P	Kerem Alsan (TUR)	Caleb Chapman (NZL)	Hugo Galvez (FRA)	Nathan Nicoud (FRA)
5	P	Yaroslav Labutkin (RUS)	Ziya Efe Güçlü (TUR)	Elvis Hsu (HKG)	Volodymyr Troshkin (UKR)
6	P	Yu Jiacong (CHN)	Hong Seung-woo (KOR)	Axel Ruski-Jones (NZL)	Pablo González (ESP)
7	P	Corné van Stuijvenberg (NED)	Daniel Assavolyuk (GER)	Marlon D'Acunto (GER)	Maks Perčič (SLO)
8	P	Wataru Suzuki (JPN)	Joris Valčiukas (LTU)	Erik Potšinok (EST)	Yam Yau (HKG)
9	P	Adam Sýkora (SVK)	Riley Langille (AUS)	Evan Nauth (GBR)	Alessandro Segafredo (ITA)
10	P	Dominik Pavlata (CZE)	Cater Hamill (GBR)	Artur Seniut (LTU)	
11	P	Linas Dėdinas (LTU)	Konrad Kudeviita (EST)	Matyáš Šapovaliv (CZE)	Marek Potšinok (EST)
12	P	Danil Karpovich (BLR)	Simone Terraneo (SUI)	Milán Ivády (HUN)	Patrik Dalen (NOR)
22	P				Ilya Korzun (BLR)
30	GK	Kalle Varis (FIN)	Oliver Thestrup Hansen (DEN)	Rastislav Eliáš (SVK)	Štěpán Maleček (CZE)
31	GK	Matthias Rindone (ITA)	Issa Otsuka (JPN)	Sebastian Aarsund (NOR)	Levente Hegedűs (HUN)
No	Pos	Team Grey	Team Orange	Team Red	Team Yellow
2	P	Thawab Al-Subaey (QAT)	Matthew Hamnett (SGP)	Juho Lukkari (FIN)	Tibo Van Reeth (BEL)
3	P	Alejandro Resendiz (MEX)	Jakub Michalski (POL)	Denis Pasko (UKR)	Csongor Antal (ROU)
4	P	Nowruz Baýhanow (TKM)	Diego Rodriguez (MEX)	Lin Wei-yu (TPE)	Yassin Soubra (FRA)
5	P	Gosei Daikuhara (JPN)	Tomoyoshi Yuki (JPN)	Aleks Menc (POL)	Tommaso Madaschi (ITA)
6	P	Timofei Katkov (RUS)	Nicolò Remolato (ITA)	Matija Dinić (SRB)	David Guilabert (ESP)
7	P	Pablo Mata (ESP)	Jack Lewis (NZL)	Peter Repčík (SVK)	Ryan Kolgen (NED)
8	P	Sohn Hyun (KOR)	Kim Sang-yeob (KOR)	Mackenzie Stewart (GBR)	Miha Beričič (SLO)
9	P	Patrik Melicher (SVK)	Jonas Dobnig (AUT)	Dylan Wesseling (NED)	Andrei Murashko (BLR)
10	P	Jan Billa (AUT)	Roman Kechter (GER)	Tjaš Lesničar (SLO)	Oskar Bakkevig (NOR)
11	P	Nino Tomov (BUL)	Márk Weidemann (HUN)	Sander Salvær (NOR)	Šimon Slavíček (CZE)
12	P	Boldizsár Szalay (HUN)	Leni Michellod (SUI)	Jan Hornecker (SUI)	Daniel Valencia (MEX)
30	GK	Lukas Svedin (SWE)	Ivan Novozhilov (RUS)	Matthias Bittner (GER)	Loris Uberti (SUI)
31	GK	Alexei Baidek (KAZ)	Yan Shostak (BLR)	Maël Halladj (FRA)	Lukas Heuberger (AUT)

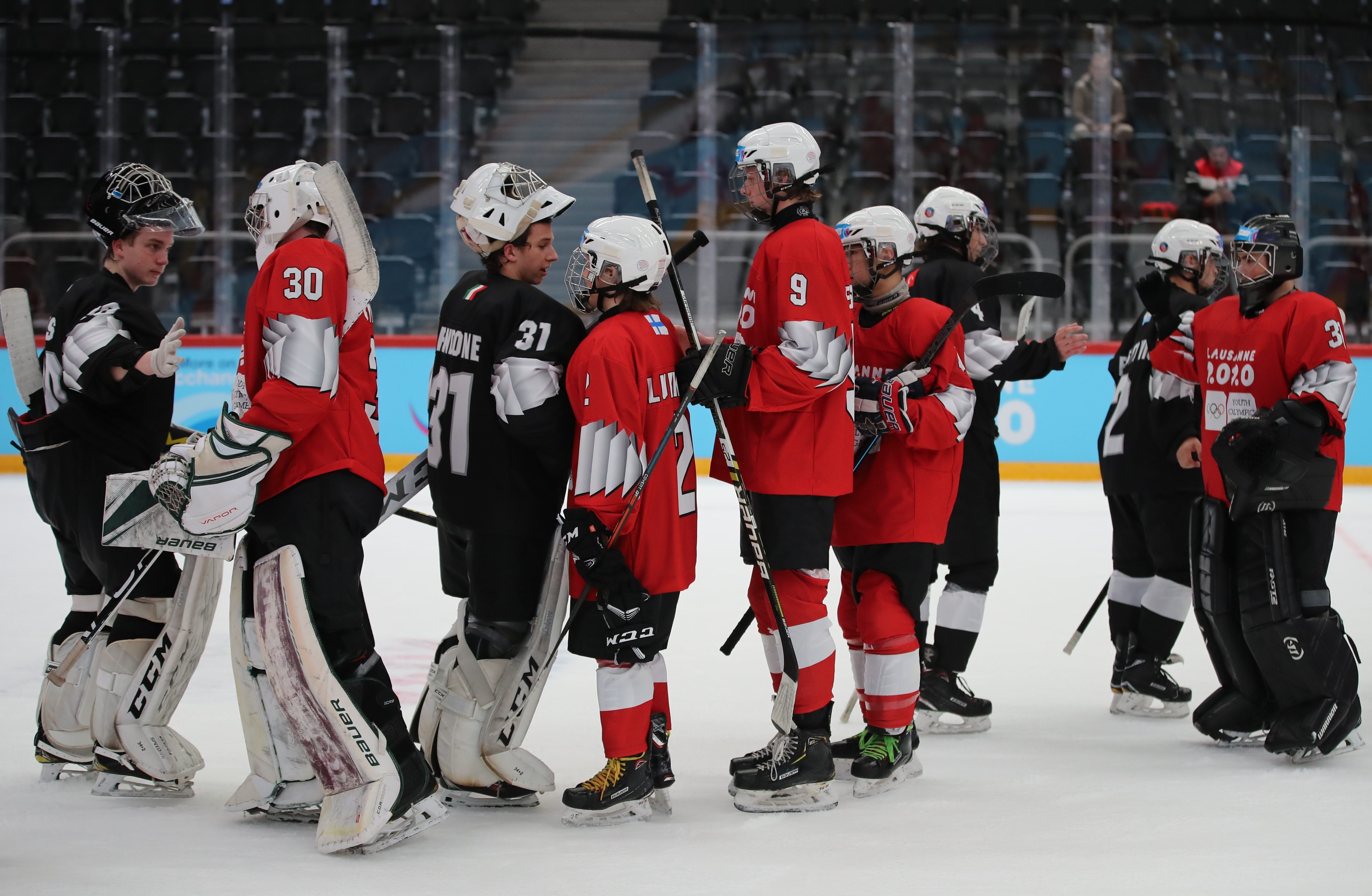
Teams Black and Red shaking hands after their preliminary game

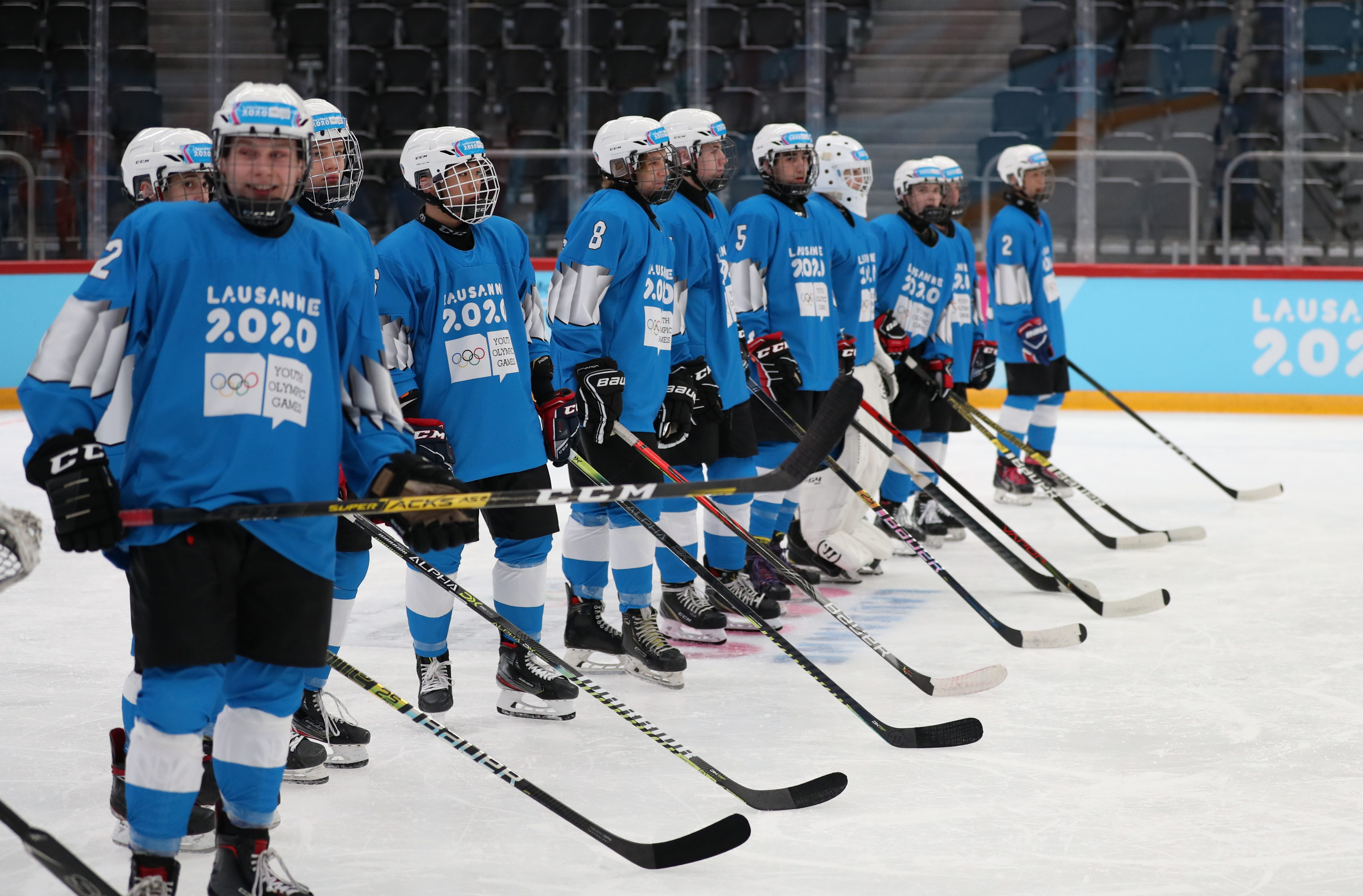
Team Blue

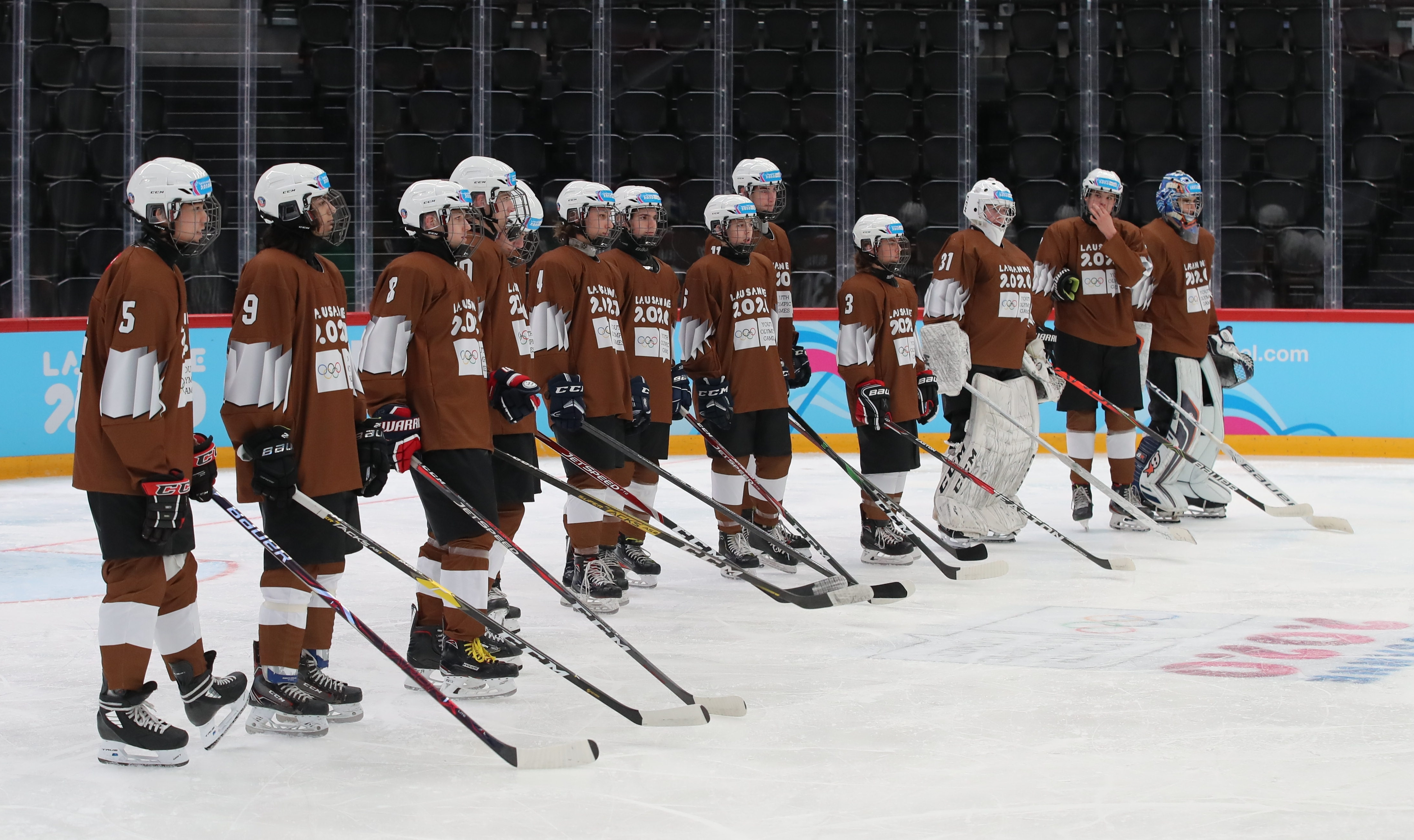
Team Brown

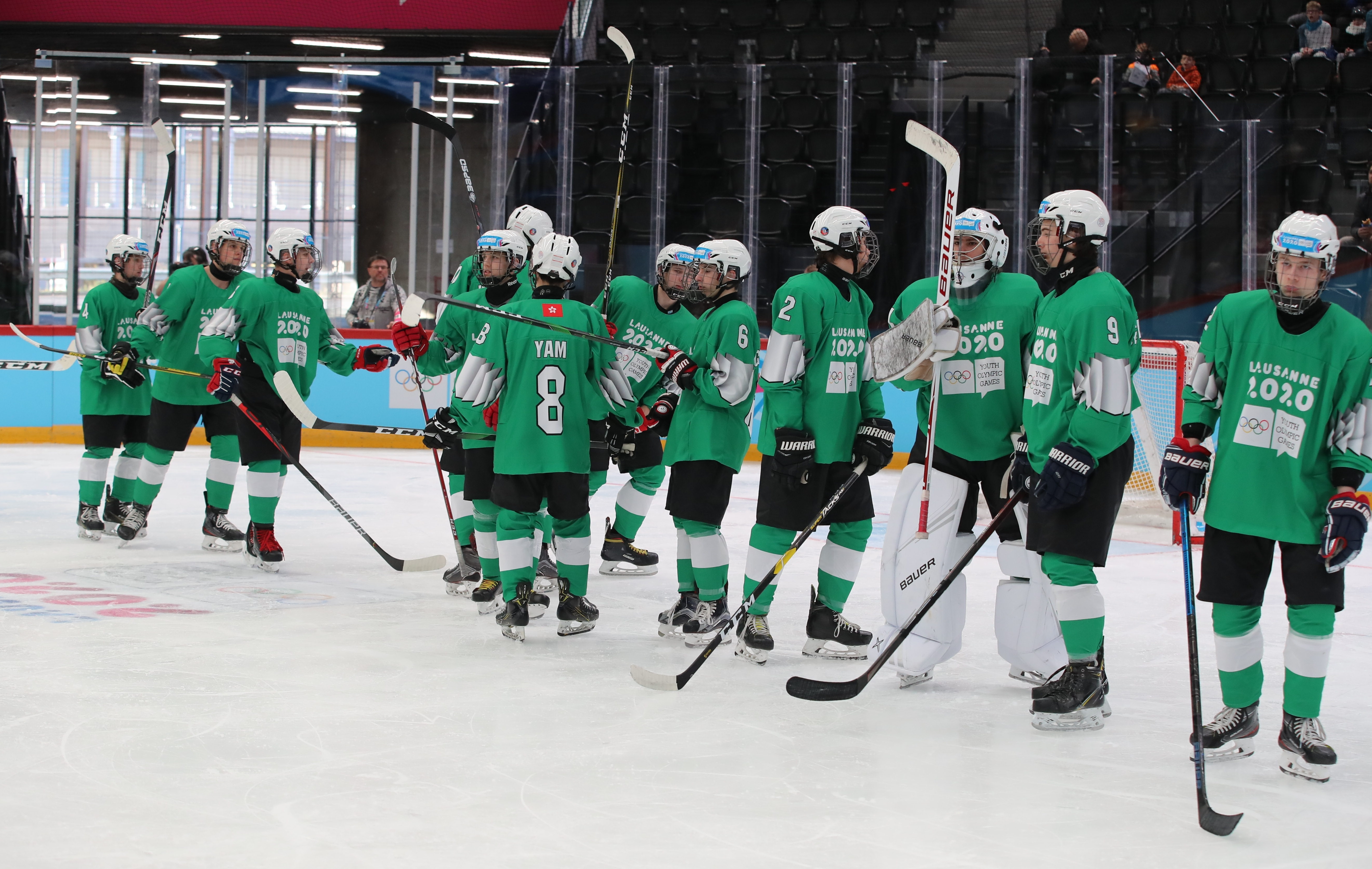
Team Green

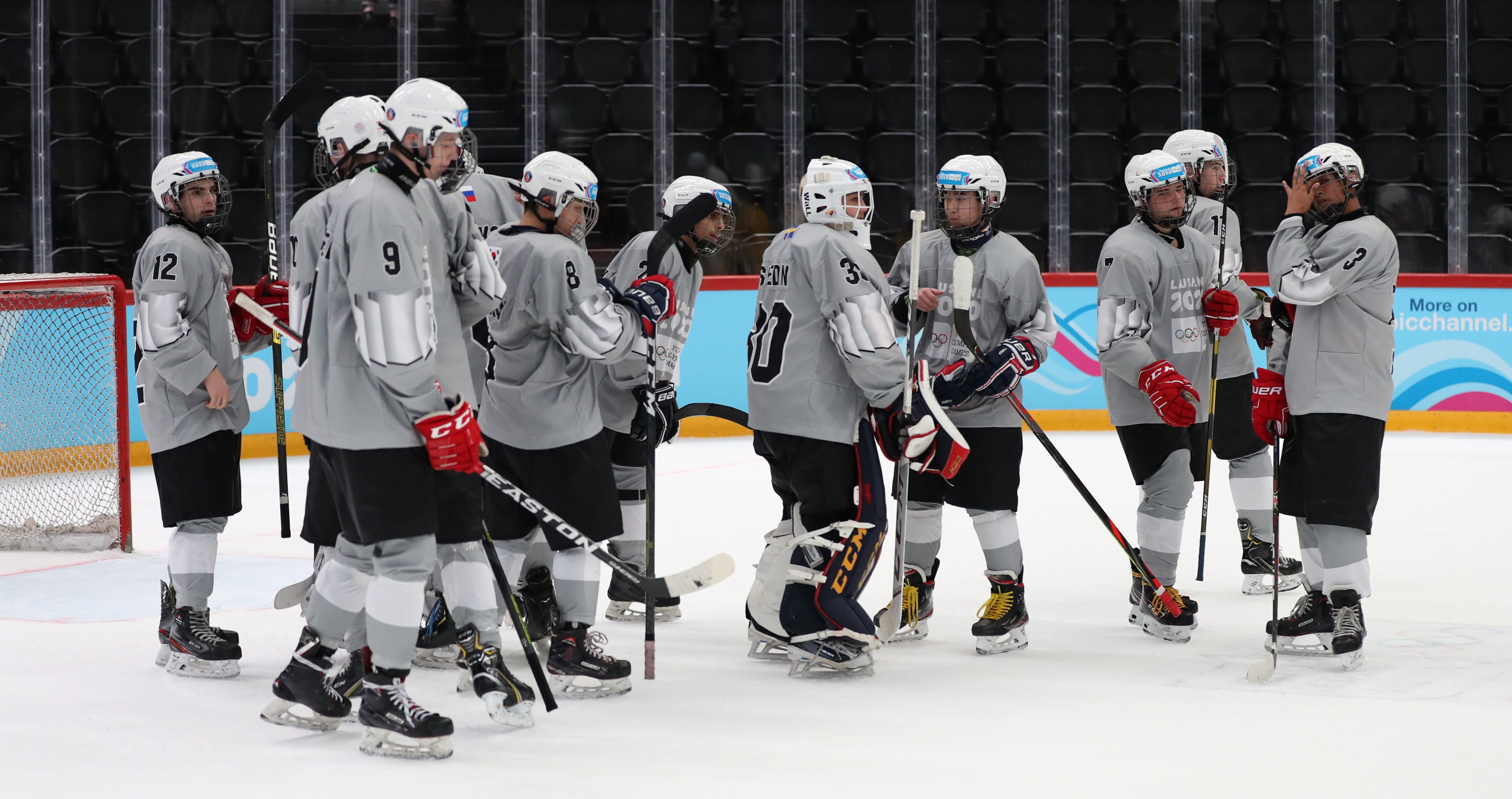
Team Grey

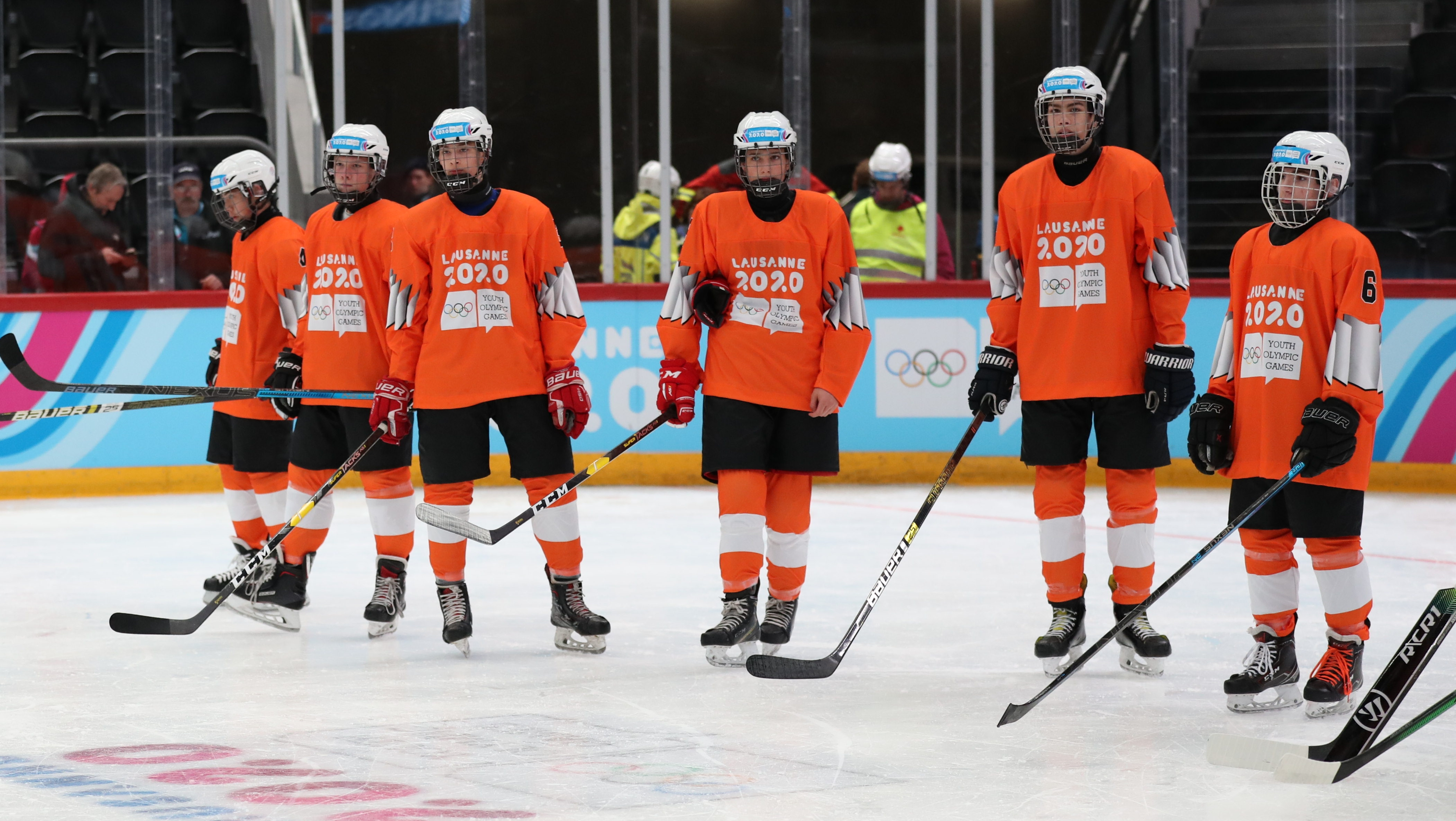
Members of Team Orange

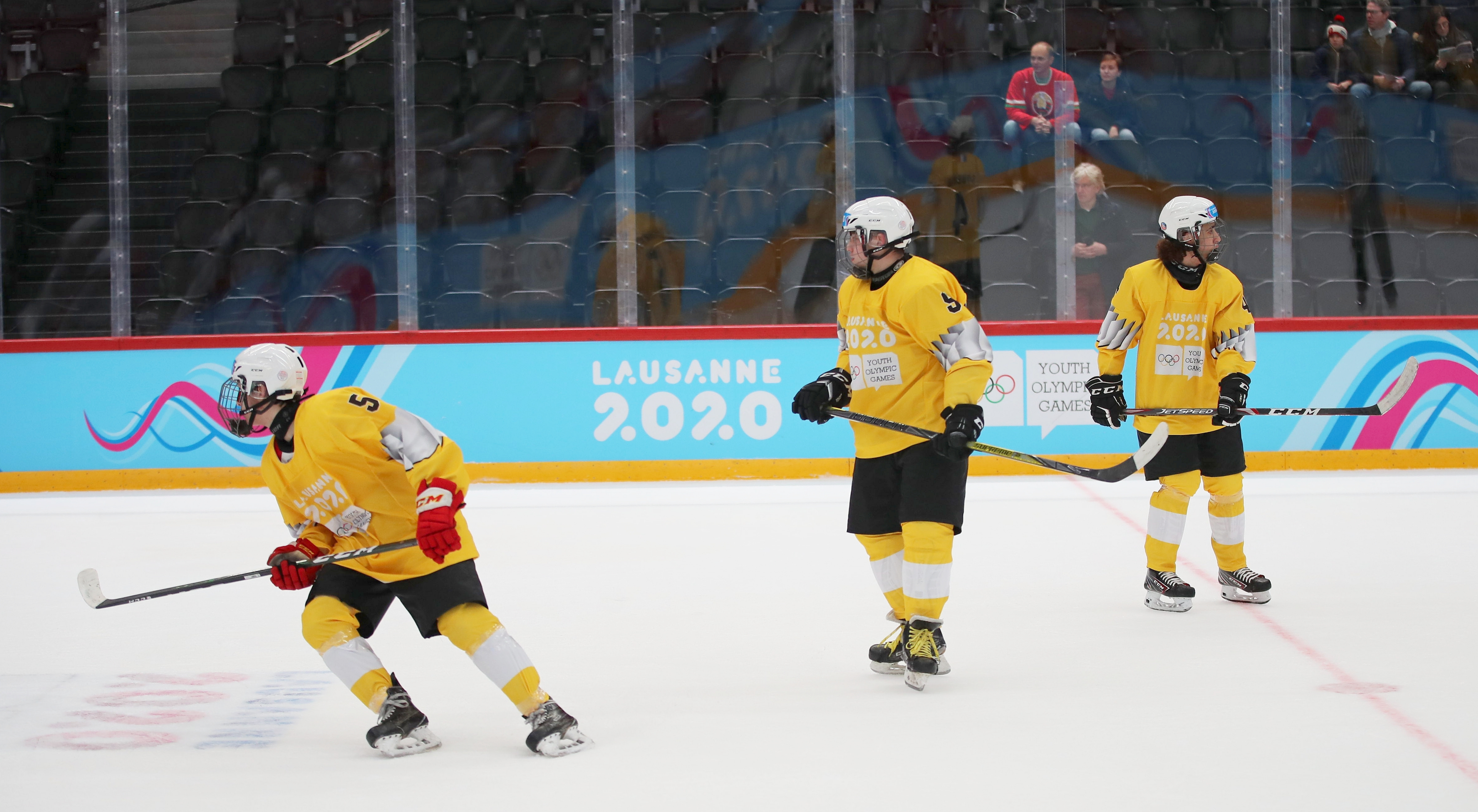
Members of Team Yellow

== Preliminary round ==
All times are local (UTC+1).

Pos	Team	Pld	W	SOW	SOL	L	GF	GA	GD	Pts	Qualification
1	Team Green	7	5	1	0	1	64	43	+21	17	Semifinals
2	Team Brown	7	5	0	0	2	76	54	+22	15	Semifinals
3	Team Red	7	4	0	1	2	79	68	+11	13	Semifinals
4	Team Black	7	4	0	0	3	83	66	+17	12 (Note: Team Grey 8–16 Team Black)	Semifinals
5	Team Grey	7	4	0	0	3	58	73	−15	12	
6	Team Orange	7	3	0	0	4	56	51	+5	9	
7	Team Yellow	7	2	0	0	5	61	75	−14	6	
8	Team Blue	7	0	0	0	7	44	91	−47	0	

Source: Lausanne2020
Notes:

10 January 2020; 16:00	Team Yellow	5–10 (0–2, 2–1, 3–7)	Team Green	Vaudoise aréna

Game reference
			Referees: (Sweden) Filip Eriksson (Russia) Igor Prusov
35	Shots	49	Referees: (Sweden) Filip Eriksson (Russia) Igor Prusov

10 January 2020; 16:00	Team Brown	13–11 (6–5, 3–2, 4–4)	Team Black	Vaudoise aréna

Game reference
			Referees: (Switzerland) Eric Cattaneo (Czech Republic) Jan Jaroš
49	Shots	44	Referees: (Switzerland) Eric Cattaneo (Czech Republic) Jan Jaroš

10 January 2020; 17:30	Team Red	6–8 (3–1, 1–1, 2–6)	Team Orange	Vaudoise aréna

Game reference
			Referees: (United States) Shane Gustafson (Russia) Igor Prusov
30	Shots	41	Referees: (United States) Shane Gustafson (Russia) Igor Prusov

10 January 2020; 17:30	Team Grey	9–8 (2–1, 5–3, 2–4)	Team Blue	Vaudoise aréna

Game reference
			Referees: (Switzerland) Eric Cattaneo (Sweden) Filip Eriksson
47	Shots	35	Referees: (Switzerland) Eric Cattaneo (Sweden) Filip Eriksson

11 January 2020; 09:00	Team Yellow	8–11 (1–6, 5–2, 2–3)	Team Grey	Vaudoise aréna

Game reference
			Referees: (Switzerland) Eric Cattaneo (Russia) Igor Prusov
53	Shots	49	Referees: (Switzerland) Eric Cattaneo (Russia) Igor Prusov

11 January 2020; 09:00	Team Black	9–12 (3–4, 4–3, 2–5)	Team Red	Vaudoise aréna

Game reference
			Referees: (United States) Shane Gustafson (Czech Republic) Jan Jaroš
51	Shots	51	Referees: (United States) Shane Gustafson (Czech Republic) Jan Jaroš

11 January 2020; 10:30	Team Green	8–6 (2–1, 2–3, 4–2)	Team Brown	Vaudoise aréna

Game reference
			Referees: (Sweden) Filip Eriksson (Russia) Igor Prusov
55	Shots	56	Referees: (Sweden) Filip Eriksson (Russia) Igor Prusov

11 January 2020; 10:30	Team Blue	1–12 (1–5, 0–2, 0–5)	Team Orange	Vaudoise aréna

Game reference
			Referees: (United States) Shane Gustafson (Czech Republic) Jan Jaroš
40	Shots	46	Referees: (United States) Shane Gustafson (Czech Republic) Jan Jaroš

11 January 2020; 16:00	Team Blue	8–14 (4–7, 2–5, 2–2)	Team Black	Vaudoise aréna

Game reference
			Referees: (Sweden) Filip Eriksson (Russia) Igor Prusov
55	Shots	52	Referees: (Sweden) Filip Eriksson (Russia) Igor Prusov

11 January 2020; 16:00	Team Yellow	9–4 (2–1, 5–1, 2–2)	Team Orange	Vaudoise aréna

Game reference
			Referees: (Switzerland) Eric Cattaneo (Czech Republic) Jan Jaroš
49	Shots	41	Referees: (Switzerland) Eric Cattaneo (Czech Republic) Jan Jaroš

11 January 2020; 17:30	Team Red	8–9 GWS (4–2, 2–3, 2–3) (SO: 0–1)	Team Green	Vaudoise aréna

Game reference
			Referees: (Switzerland) Eric Cattaneo (United States) Shane Gustafson
38	Shots	68	Referees: (Switzerland) Eric Cattaneo (United States) Shane Gustafson

11 January 2020; 17:30	Team Brown	16–6 (4–3, 4–2, 8–1)	Team Grey	Vaudoise aréna

Game reference
			Referees: (Sweden) Filip Eriksson (Czech Republic) Jan Jaroš
52	Shots	51	Referees: (Sweden) Filip Eriksson (Czech Republic) Jan Jaroš

12 January 2020; 09:00	Team Orange	10–14 (0–6, 4–5, 6–3)	Team Brown	Vaudoise aréna

Game reference
			Referees: (Sweden) Filip Eriksson (United States) Shane Gustafson
60	Shots	42	Referees: (Sweden) Filip Eriksson (United States) Shane Gustafson

12 January 2020; 09:00	Team Green	11–6 (2–1, 2–3, 7–2)	Team Blue	Vaudoise aréna

Game reference
			Referees: (Switzerland) Eric Cattaneo (Russia) Igor Prusov
53	Shots	35	Referees: (Switzerland) Eric Cattaneo (Russia) Igor Prusov

12 January 2020; 10:30	Team Black	19–7 (7–2, 6–2, 6–3)	Team Yellow	Vaudoise aréna

Game reference
			Referees: (Sweden) Filip Eriksson (United States) Shane Gustafson
52	Shots	41	Referees: (Sweden) Filip Eriksson (United States) Shane Gustafson

12 January 2020; 10:30	Team Red	9–13 (2–4, 5–3, 2–6)	Team Grey	Vaudoise aréna

Game reference
			Referees: (Switzerland) Eric Cattaneo (Russia) Igor Prusov
47	Shots	66	Referees: (Switzerland) Eric Cattaneo (Russia) Igor Prusov

12 January 2020; 16:00	Team Red	11–5 (3–2, 4–1, 4–2)	Team Brown	Vaudoise aréna

Game reference
			Referees: (Sweden) Filip Eriksson (United States) Shane Gustafson
48	Shots	36	Referees: (Sweden) Filip Eriksson (United States) Shane Gustafson

12 January 2020; 16:00	Team Grey	6–14 (2–3, 1–4, 3–7)	Team Green	Vaudoise aréna

Game reference
			Referees: (Switzerland) Eric Cattaneo (Czech Republic) Jan Jaroš
53	Shots	69	Referees: (Switzerland) Eric Cattaneo (Czech Republic) Jan Jaroš

12 January 2020; 17:30	Team Black	8–14 (4–3, 3–4, 1–7)	Team Orange	Vaudoise aréna

Game reference
			Referees: (Switzerland) Eric Cattaneo (Sweden) Filip Eriksson
49	Shots	60	Referees: (Switzerland) Eric Cattaneo (Sweden) Filip Eriksson

12 January 2020; 17:30	Team Blue	8–13 (2–3, 2–4, 4–6)	Team Yellow	Vaudoise aréna

Game reference
			Referees: (Czech Republic) Jan Jaroš (Russia) Igor Prusov
50	Shots	49	Referees: (Czech Republic) Jan Jaroš (Russia) Igor Prusov

13 January 2020; 09:00	Team Grey	8–16 (4–2, 1–10, 3–4)	Team Black	Vaudoise aréna

Game reference
			Referees: (Switzerland) Eric Cattaneo (Czech Republic) Jan Jaroš
50	Shots	51	Referees: (Switzerland) Eric Cattaneo (Czech Republic) Jan Jaroš

13 January 2020; 09:00	Team Yellow	13–15 (3–5, 6–4, 4–6)	Team Red	Vaudoise aréna

Game reference
			Referees: (United States) Shane Gustafson (Russia) Igor Prusov
58	Shots	47	Referees: (United States) Shane Gustafson (Russia) Igor Prusov

13 January 2020; 10:30	Team Brown	14–2 (5–0, 3–1, 6–1)	Team Blue	Vaudoise aréna

Game reference
			Referees: (Switzerland) Eric Cattaneo (Czech Republic) Jan Jaroš
52	Shots	39	Referees: (Switzerland) Eric Cattaneo (Czech Republic) Jan Jaroš

13 January 2020; 10:30	Team Orange	6–8 (1–1, 1–1, 4–6)	Team Green	Vaudoise aréna

Game reference
			Referees: (Sweden) Filip Eriksson (United States) Shane Gustafson
26	Shots	54	Referees: (Sweden) Filip Eriksson (United States) Shane Gustafson

13 January 2020; 16:00	Team Blue	11–18 (2–11, 3–3, 6–4)	Team Red	Vaudoise aréna

Game reference
			Referees: (Switzerland) Eric Cattaneo (Czech Republic) Jan Jaroš
53	Shots	49	Referees: (Switzerland) Eric Cattaneo (Czech Republic) Jan Jaroš

13 January 2020; 16:00	Team Orange	2–5 (2–3, 0–0, 0–2)	Team Grey	Vaudoise aréna

Game reference
			Referees: (United States) Shane Gustafson (Russia) Igor Prusov
48	Shots	38	Referees: (United States) Shane Gustafson (Russia) Igor Prusov

13 January 2020; 17:30	Team Green	4–6 (2–2, 1–2, 1–2)	Team Black	Vaudoise aréna

Game reference
			Referees: (Sweden) Filip Eriksson (Czech Republic) Jan Jaroš
38	Shots	40	Referees: (Sweden) Filip Eriksson (Czech Republic) Jan Jaroš

13 January 2020; 17:30	Team Brown	8–6 (2–1, 2–0, 4–5)	Team Yellow	Vaudoise aréna

Game reference
			Referees: (United States) Shane Gustafson (Russia) Igor Prusov
35	Shots	52	Referees: (United States) Shane Gustafson (Russia) Igor Prusov

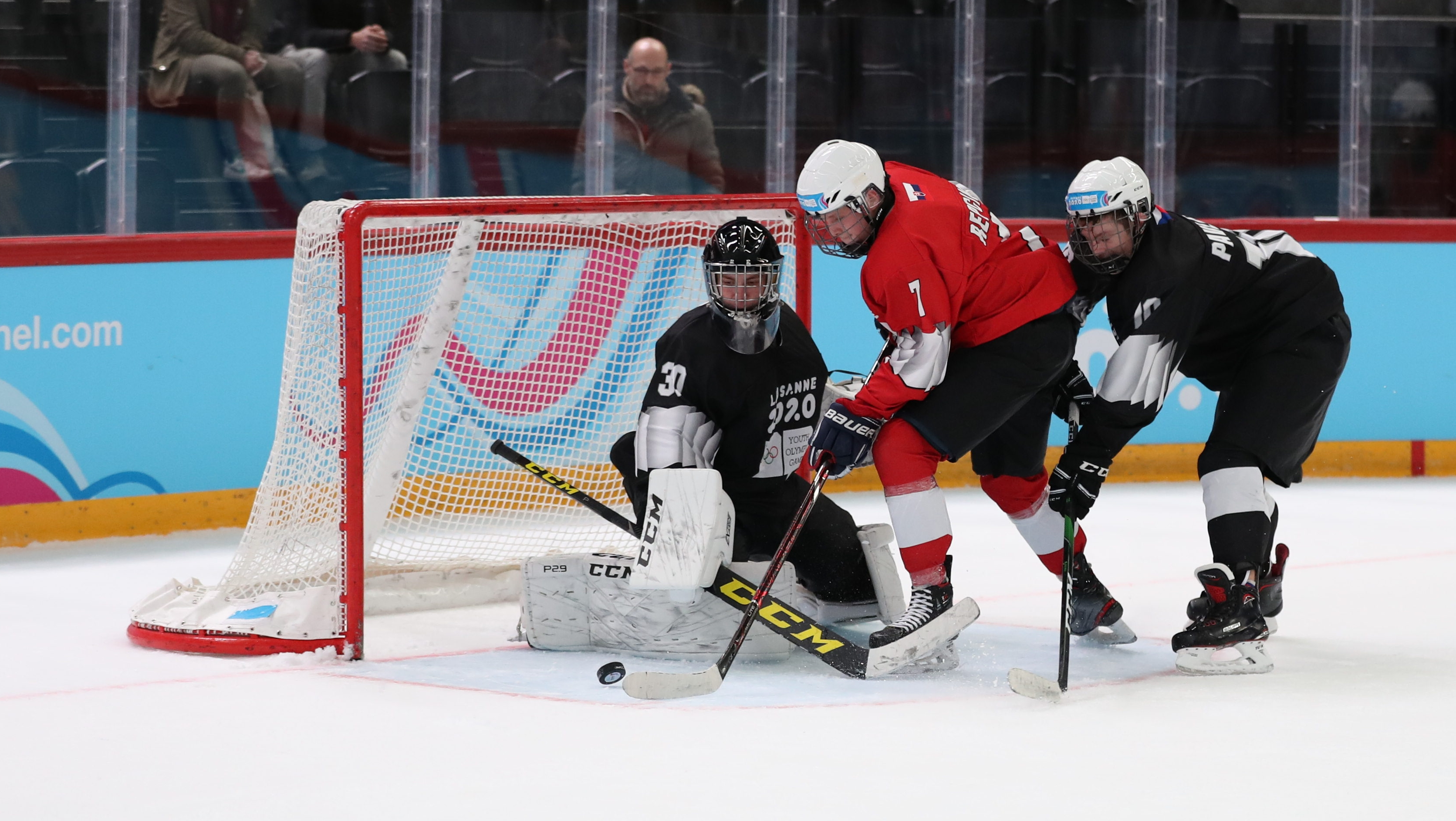
Team Red attacks Team Black

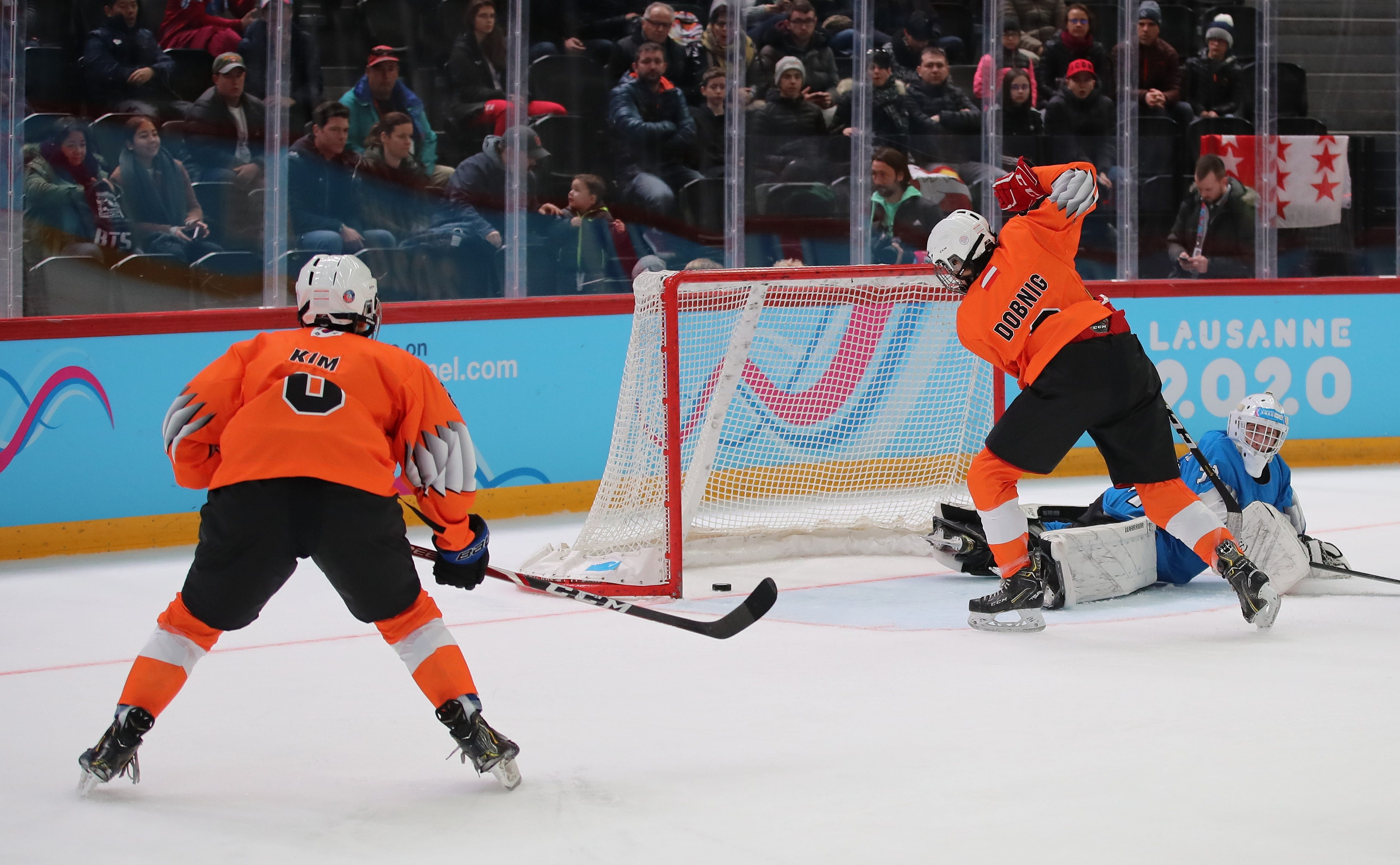
Team Orange scores a goal against Team Blue

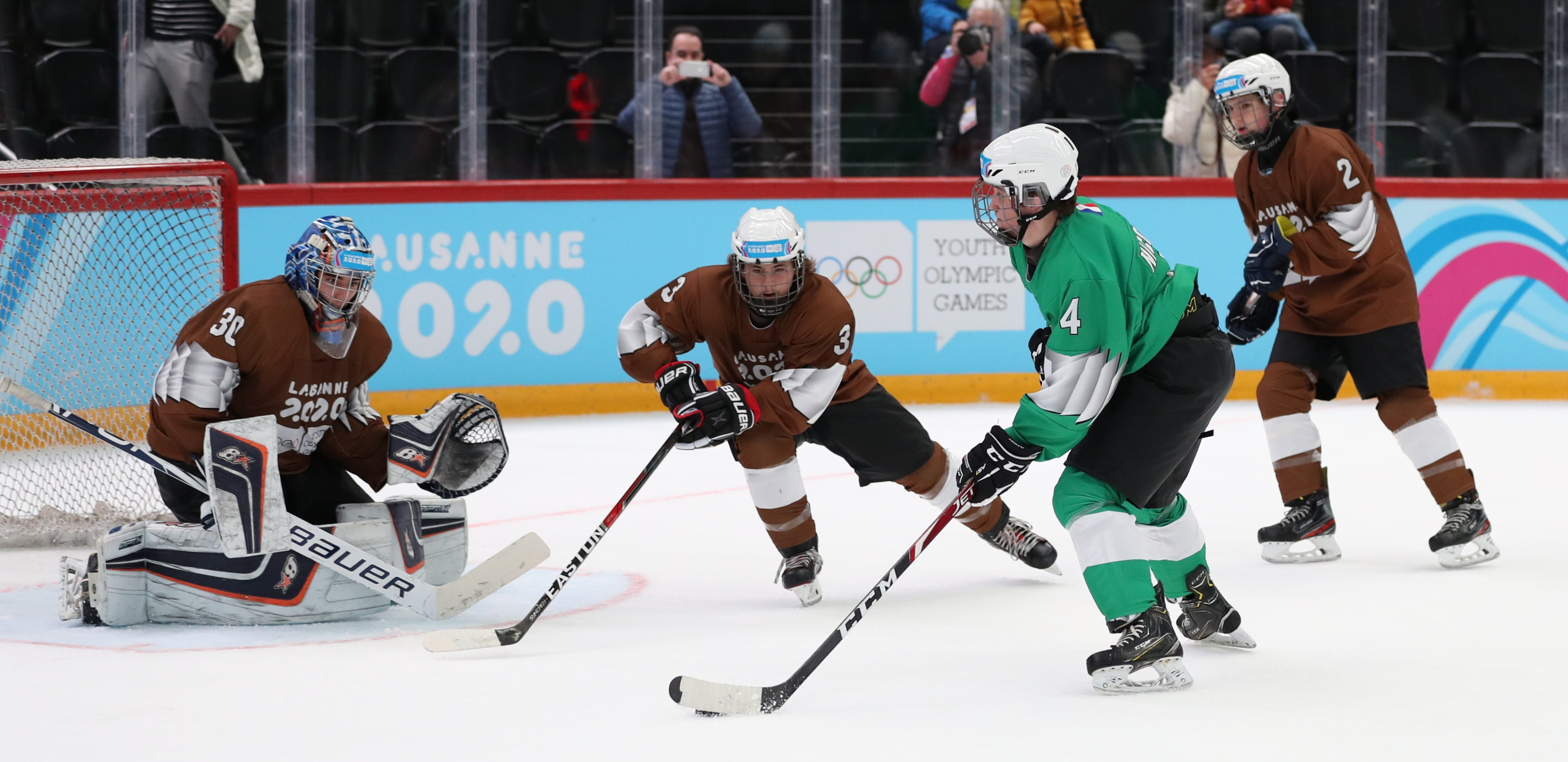
Team Green attacks Team Brown

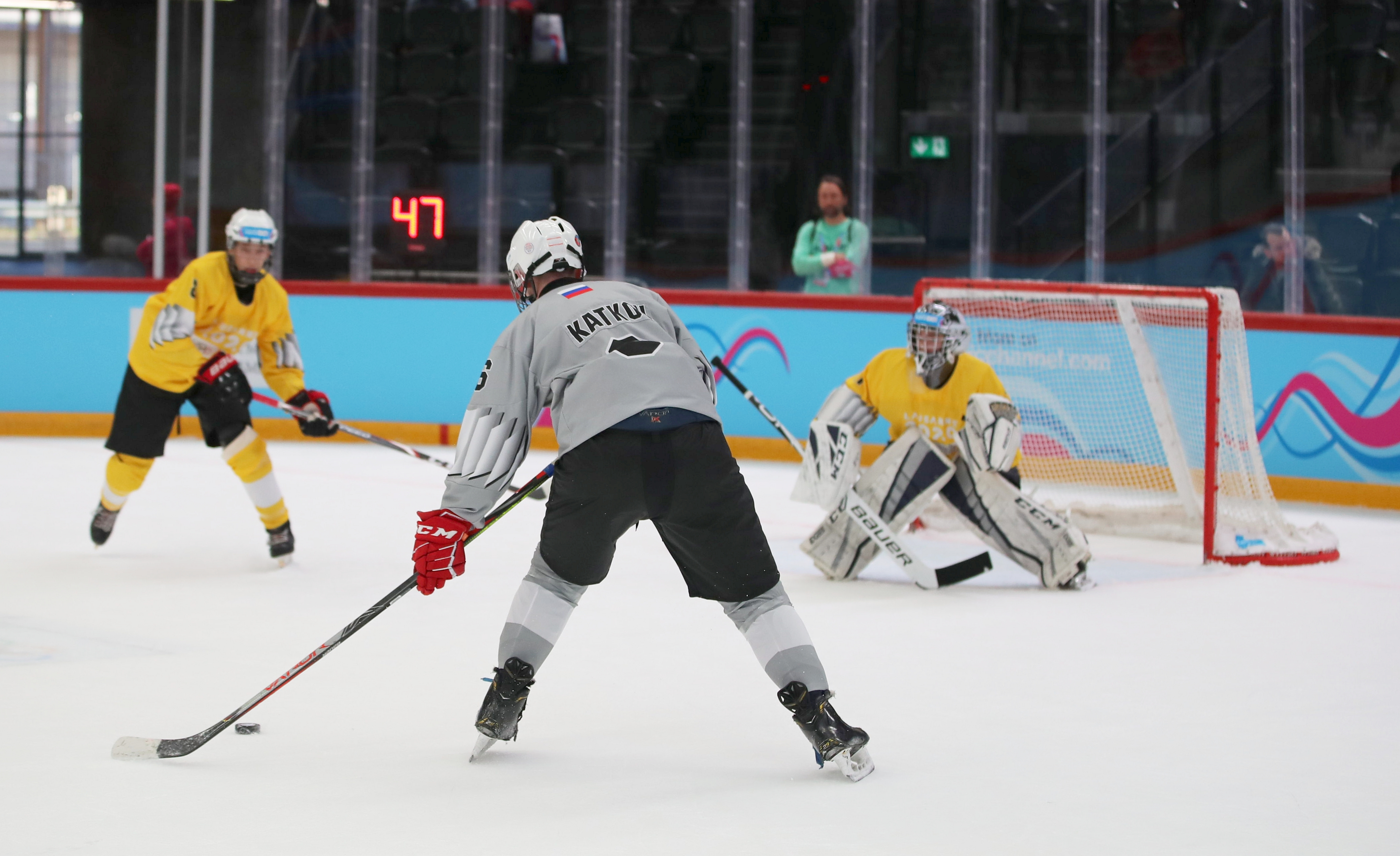
Team Grey versus Team Yellow

== Playoff round ==
=== Bracket ===
Semifinals
14 January
Team Green	7
Team Black	3
14 January
Team Brown	7
Team Red	9

Final
15 January
Team Green	10
Team Red	4
Third place
15 January
Team Brown	6
Team Black	5

=== Semifinals ===
14 January 2020; 12:00	Team Green	7–3 (0–2, 2–0, 5–1)	Team Black	Vaudoise aréna

Game reference
			Referees: (Switzerland) Eric Cattaneo (Czech Republic) Jan Jaroš
44	Shots	42	Referees: (Switzerland) Eric Cattaneo (Czech Republic) Jan Jaroš

14 January 2020; 13:30	Team Brown	7–9 (4–4, 2–3, 1–2)	Team Red	Vaudoise aréna

Game reference
			Referees: (United States) Shane Gustafson (Russia) Igor Prusov
32	Shots	48	Referees: (United States) Shane Gustafson (Russia) Igor Prusov

=== Bronze medal game ===
15 January 2020; 12:00	(bronze) Team Brown	6–5 (1–2, 3–1, 2–2)	Team Black	Vaudoise aréna

Game reference
			Referees: (Switzerland) Eric Cattaneo (United States) Shane Gustafson
32	Shots	54	Referees: (Switzerland) Eric Cattaneo (United States) Shane Gustafson

=== Gold medal game ===
15 January 2020; 13:30	(gold) Team Green	10–4 (3–2, 4–1, 3–1)	Team Red (silver)	Vaudoise aréna

Game reference
			Referees: (Sweden) Filip Eriksson (Czech Republic) Jan Jaroš
55	Shots	31	Referees: (Sweden) Filip Eriksson (Czech Republic) Jan Jaroš
