= Speed skating at the 2020 Winter Youth Olympics – Girls' 1500 metres =

Girls' 1500 metres at the III Winter Youth Olympic Games
- Venue: Lake St. Moritz
- Date: 13 January
- Competitors: 32 from 17 nations
- Winning time: 2:10.44

Medalists
1st place, gold medalist(s)		Myrthe de Boer	Netherlands
2nd place, silver medalist(s)		Yuka Takahashi	Japan
3rd place, bronze medalist(s)		Yang Binyu	China

The girls' 1500 metres speed skating competition of the 2020 Winter Youth Olympics was held at Lake St. Moritz on 13 January 2020.

== Results ==
The races were held at 11:30.

Rank	Pair	Lane	Name	Country	Time	Time Behind
1st place, gold medalist(s)	16	o	Myrthe de Boer	Netherlands	2:10.44	
2nd place, silver medalist(s)	13	i	Yuka Takahashi	Japan	2:10.58	+0.14
3rd place, bronze medalist(s)	16	i	Yang Binyu	China	2:10.93	+0.49
4	14	o	Victoria Stirnemann	Germany	2:11.36	+0.92
5	9	i	Aleksandra Rutkovskaia	Russia	2:13.41	+2.97
6	4	i	Katia Filippi	Italy	2:13.63	+3.19
7	13	o	Isabel Grevelt	Netherlands	2:14.56	+4.12
8	4	o	Fran Vanhoutte	Belgium	2:16.82	+6.38
9	11	i	Yukino Yoshida	Japan	2:17.054	+6.61
10	12	o	Valeriia Sorokoletova	Russia	2:17.059	+6.61
11	8	o	Darya Gavrilova	Kazakhstan	2:17.06	+6.62
12	10	i	Julie Berg Sjøbrend	Norway	2:17.24	+6.80
13	14	i	Kang Soo-min	South Korea	2:17.28	+6.84
14	10	o	Zuzana Kuršová	Czech Republic	2:18.65	+8.21
15	7	o	Alina Dauranova	Kazakhstan	2:18.82	+8.38
16	8	i	Hanna Bíró	Hungary	2:19.29	+8.85
17	5	o	Laura Kivioja	Finland	2:19.39	+8.95
18	15	o	Anna Ostlender	Germany	2:19.58	+9.14
19	11	o	Karyna Shypulia	Belarus	2:20.08	+9.64
20	5	i	Amalie Haugland	Norway	2:20.12	+9.68
21	1	o	Ramona Ionel	Romania	2:20.21	+9.77
22	6	o	Daria Kopacz	Poland	2:20.49	+10.05
23	7	i	Ilka Füzesy	Romania	2:20.58	+10.14
24	12	i	Marta Dobrowolska	Poland	2:22.34	+11.90
25	3	o	Kateřina Macháčková	Czech Republic	2:22.84	+12.40
26	6	i	Kim Min-hui	South Korea	2:23.48	+13.04
27	2	o	Sini Siro	Finland	2:23.73	+13.29
28	9	o	Varvara Bandaryna	Belarus	2:24.61	+14.17
29	2	i	Luisa González	Spain	2:25.68	+15.24
30	1	i	Serena Pergher	Italy	2:29.82	+19.38
31	3	i	Carla Álvarez	Spain	2:37.24	+26.80
	15	i	Wang Jingyi	China	Disqualified	
