= Snowboarding at the 2020 Winter Youth Olympics =

Snowboarding at the III Winter Youth Olympic Games
- Venue: Leysin and Villars, Switzerland
- Dates: 18–22 January
- Competitors: 127 from 31 nations

Snowboarding at the 2020 Winter Youth Olympics took place in Leysin and Villars, Switzerland.

== Events ==
=== Medal table ===
* Host nation (Switzerland)

Rank	Nation	Gold	Silver	Bronze	Total
1	Japan	4	3	0	7
2	Switzerland*	2	0	4	6
3	Australia	1	0	0	1
3	Belgium	1	0	0	1
3	United States	1	0	0	1
6	Germany	0	2	1	3
7	Canada	0	1	2	3
8	Netherlands	0	1	1	2
9	France	0	1	0	1
9	Russia	0	1	0	1
11	Spain	0	0	1	1
Totals (11 entries)		9	9	9	27

=== Boys' events ===
Event	Gold		Silver		Bronze	
Boys' big air	Ryoma Kimata; Japan	195.00	Aoto Kawakami; Japan	191.75	Liam Brearley; Canada	183.25
Boys' halfpipe	Ruka Hirano; Japan	97.33	Kaishu Hirano; Japan	95.66	Liam Brearley; Canada	82.00
Boys' slopestyle	Dusty Henricksen; United States	96.33	Liam Brearley; Canada	85.33	Nick Pünter; Switzerland	66.33
Boys' snowboard cross	Valerio Jud; Switzerland		Niels Conradt; Germany		Álvaro Romero; Spain	

=== Girls' events ===
Event	Gold		Silver		Bronze	
Girls' big air	Hinari Asanuma; Japan	172.50	Annika Morgan; Germany	160.50	Melissa Peperkamp; Netherlands	150.00
Girls' halfpipe	Mitsuki Ono; Japan	95.33	Manon Kaji; Japan	85.33	Berenice Wicki; Switzerland	81.33
Girls' slopestyle	Evy Poppe; Belgium	94.00	Melissa Peperkamp; Netherlands	91.75	Bianca Gisler; Switzerland	78.25
Girls' snowboard cross	Josie Baff; Australia		Margaux Herpin; France		Anouk Dörig; Switzerland	

=== Mixed event ===
- Will include athletes from freestyle skiing

Event	Gold	Silver	Bronze
Team ski-snowboard cross	Switzerland; Anouk Dörig; Marie Krista; Valerio Jud; Robin Tissières	Russia; Anastasia Privalova; Mariia Erofeeva; Evgeniy Genin; Andrei Gorbachev	Germany; Lilith Kuhnert; Nina Walderbach; Niels Conradt; Sebastian Veit

== Qualification ==
=== Summary ===
NOC	Boys'				Girls'				Total
NOC	Cross	Halfpipe	Big Air	Slopestyle	Cross	Halfpipe	Big Air	Slopestyle	Total
Argentina	1	1	1	1	1	1	2	1	5
Australia	1	1	1	1	2	2	2	2	6
Austria	2		1	1	2		1	1	6
Belgium							1	1	1
Brazil	1								1
Bulgaria	1				1				2
Canada	2	3	2	3	2	2	3	3	12
Chile			1	2					2
China	1	1			2	2	1	1	8
Czech Republic	1				2		1	1	4
Finland		1	2	2			1	2	4
France	2				2				4
Germany	1	1	2	2	2		2	1	8
Greece	1		1						1
Hungary					1				1
Italy	2				2		1	1	5
Japan	1	2	2	2		2	2	2	9
Lithuania			1	1					1
Netherlands							1	1	1
New Zealand			1	1					1
Norway				1			2	2	3
Romania	1								1
Russia	2	2	1	1	2				6
Slovakia					1		1	1	2
Slovenia			1	1					1
South Korea	1	2				1			4
Spain	1				1				2
Sweden			1	1					1
Switzerland	2	2	2	2	2	2	2	2	12
Ukraine	1								1
United States	2	2	3	3	2	2	2	2	12
Total: 31 NOCs	27	18	22	25	27	14	25	24	127
