= Speed skating at the 2020 Winter Youth Olympics – Mixed team sprint =

Mixed team sprint at the III Winter Youth Olympic Games
- Venue: Lake St. Moritz
- Date: 15 January
- Competitors: 64 from 22 nations
- Winning time: 2:04.10

Medalists
| 1st place, gold medalist(s) | | Sini Siro; Yukino Yoshida; Ignaz Gschwentner; Alexander Sergeev | Mixed-NOCs |
| 2nd place, silver medalist(s) | | Laura Kivioja; Daria Kopacz; Theo Collins; Motonaga Arito | Mixed-NOCs |
| 3rd place, bronze medalist(s) | | Ramona Ionel; Valeriia Sorokoletova; Tuukka Suomalainen; Jonathan Tobon | Mixed-NOCs |

The mixed team sprint speed skating competition of the 2020 Winter Youth Olympics was held at Lake St. Moritz on 15 January 2020.

== Results ==
The races were held at 11:30.

| Rank | Heat | Team | Time | Time Behind |
|---|---|---|---|---|
| 1st place, gold medalist(s) | 1 | Team 3 Sini Siro (FIN); Yukino Yoshida (JPN); Ignaz Gschwentner (AUT); Alexander Sergeev (RUS) | 2:04.10 | |
| 2nd place, silver medalist(s) | 4 | Team 16; Laura Kivioja (FIN); Daria Kopacz (POL); Theo Collins (GBR); Motonaga Arito (JPN) | 2:05.92 | +1.82 |
| 3rd place, bronze medalist(s) | 3 | Team 14; Ramona Ionel (ROU); Valeriia Sorokoletova (RUS); Tuukka Suomalainen (FIN); Jonathan Tobon (USA) | 2:05.96 | +1.86 |
| 4 | 1 | Team 9 Serena Pergher (ITA); Ilka Füzesy (ROU); Yang Suk-hoon (KOR); Nil Llop (ESP) | 2:06.33 | +2.23 |
| 5 | 5 | Team 7 Varvara Bandaryna (BLR); Myrthe de Boer (NED); Lukáš Steklý (CZE); Yudai Yamamoto (JPN) | 2:06.80 | +2.70 |
| 6 | 7 | Team 15; Hanna Bíró (HUN); Kang Soo-min (KOR); Yevgeniy Koshkin (KAZ); Pavel Taran (RUS) | 2:07.27 | +3.17 |
| 7 | 6 | Team 11; Luisa María González (ESP); Fran Vanhoutte (BEL); Nicky Rosanelli (ITA); Sander Eitrem (NOR) | 2:07.46 | +3.36 |
| 8 | 5 | Team 8 Darya Gavrilova (KAZ); Victoria Stirnemann (GER); Flavio Gross (SUI); Sun Jiazhao (CHN) | 2:07.71 | +3.61 |
| 9 | 7 | Team 1 Kateřina Macháčková (CZE); Isabel Grevelt (NED); Max Fiodarav (BLR); Felix Motschmann (GER) | 2:08.16 | +4.06 |
| 10 | 2 | Team 10; Marta Dobrowolska (POL); Yuka Takahashi (JPN); Michał Kopacz (POL); Park Sang-eon (KOR) | 2:08.62 | +4.52 |
| 11 | 3 | Team 2 Zuzana Kuršová (CZE); Wang Jingyi (CHN); Manuel Zähringer (GER); Andrei Herman (BLR) | 2:09.32 | +5.22 |
| 12 | 6 | Team 12; Katia Filippi (ITA); Aleksandra Rutkovskaia (RUS); Eetu Käsnänen (FIN); Remo Slotegraaf (NED) | 2:10.07 | +5.97 |
| 13 | 8 | Team 4 Carla Álvarez (ESP); Yang Binyu (CHN); Filip Hawryłak (POL); Nuraly Akzhol (KAZ) | 2:10.67 | +6.57 |
| | 8 | Team 5 Amalie Haugland (NOR); Kim Min-hui (KOR); Oddbjørn Mellemstrand (NOR); Jordan Stolz (USA) | Disqualified | |
| | 2 | Team 6 Julie Berg Sjøbrend (NOR); Anna Ostlender (GER); Jakub Kočí (CZE); Sebas Diniz (NED) | Disqualified | |
| | 4 | Team 13; Karyna Shypulia (BLR); Alina Dauranova (KAZ); Xue Zhiwen (CHN); Diego Amaya (COL) | Disqualified | |
