= Serbia at the 2020 Winter Youth Olympics =

- IOC code: SRB
- NOC: Olympic Committee of Serbia
- Website: www.oks.org.rs

in Lausanne
- Competitors: 6 in 4 sports
- Medals: Gold 0 Silver 0 Bronze 0 Total 0

Winter Youth Olympics appearances
- 2012; 2016; 2020; 2024

Serbia competed at the 2020 Winter Youth Olympics in Lausanne, Switzerland from 9 to 22 January 2020. Six athletes from Serbia participated in four different sports.

== Medalists ==
Medals awarded to participants of mixed-NOC (Combined) teams are represented in italics. These medals are not counted towards the individual NOC medal tally.

Medal	Name	Sport	Event	Date
Silver	Matija Dinić	Ice hockey	Boys' 3x3 mixed tournament	15 January

== Ice hockey ==
3x3 mixed tournament

Team	Players	Bracket		Semifinals		Finals		Rank
Team	Players	Opponent	Result	Opponent	Result	Opponent	Result	Rank
Boys
Team Red	Juho Lukkari (FIN); Denis Pasko (UKR); Lin Wei-yu (TPE); Aleks Menc (POL); Matija Dinić (SRB); Peter Repčík (SVK); Mackenzie Stewart (GBR); Dylan Wesseling (NED); Tjaš Lesničar (SLO); Sander Salvær (NOR); Jan Hornecker (SUI); Matthias Bittner (GER); Maël Halladj (FRA)	Team Orange	6:8	Team Brown	9:7	Team Green	4:10	2nd place, silver medalist(s)
Team Red	Juho Lukkari (FIN); Denis Pasko (UKR); Lin Wei-yu (TPE); Aleks Menc (POL); Matija Dinić (SRB); Peter Repčík (SVK); Mackenzie Stewart (GBR); Dylan Wesseling (NED); Tjaš Lesničar (SLO); Sander Salvær (NOR); Jan Hornecker (SUI); Matthias Bittner (GER); Maël Halladj (FRA)	Team Black	12:9	Team Brown	9:7	Team Green	4:10	2nd place, silver medalist(s)
Team Red	Juho Lukkari (FIN); Denis Pasko (UKR); Lin Wei-yu (TPE); Aleks Menc (POL); Matija Dinić (SRB); Peter Repčík (SVK); Mackenzie Stewart (GBR); Dylan Wesseling (NED); Tjaš Lesničar (SLO); Sander Salvær (NOR); Jan Hornecker (SUI); Matthias Bittner (GER); Maël Halladj (FRA)	Team Green	8:9 GWS	Team Brown	9:7	Team Green	4:10	2nd place, silver medalist(s)
Team Red	Juho Lukkari (FIN); Denis Pasko (UKR); Lin Wei-yu (TPE); Aleks Menc (POL); Matija Dinić (SRB); Peter Repčík (SVK); Mackenzie Stewart (GBR); Dylan Wesseling (NED); Tjaš Lesničar (SLO); Sander Salvær (NOR); Jan Hornecker (SUI); Matthias Bittner (GER); Maël Halladj (FRA)	Team Grey	9:13	Team Brown	9:7	Team Green	4:10	2nd place, silver medalist(s)
Team Red	Juho Lukkari (FIN); Denis Pasko (UKR); Lin Wei-yu (TPE); Aleks Menc (POL); Matija Dinić (SRB); Peter Repčík (SVK); Mackenzie Stewart (GBR); Dylan Wesseling (NED); Tjaš Lesničar (SLO); Sander Salvær (NOR); Jan Hornecker (SUI); Matthias Bittner (GER); Maël Halladj (FRA)	Team Brown	11:5	Team Brown	9:7	Team Green	4:10	2nd place, silver medalist(s)
Team Red	Juho Lukkari (FIN); Denis Pasko (UKR); Lin Wei-yu (TPE); Aleks Menc (POL); Matija Dinić (SRB); Peter Repčík (SVK); Mackenzie Stewart (GBR); Dylan Wesseling (NED); Tjaš Lesničar (SLO); Sander Salvær (NOR); Jan Hornecker (SUI); Matthias Bittner (GER); Maël Halladj (FRA)	Team Yellow	15:13	Team Brown	9:7	Team Green	4:10	2nd place, silver medalist(s)
Team Red	Juho Lukkari (FIN); Denis Pasko (UKR); Lin Wei-yu (TPE); Aleks Menc (POL); Matija Dinić (SRB); Peter Repčík (SVK); Mackenzie Stewart (GBR); Dylan Wesseling (NED); Tjaš Lesničar (SLO); Sander Salvær (NOR); Jan Hornecker (SUI); Matthias Bittner (GER); Maël Halladj (FRA)	Team Blue	18:11	Team Brown	9:7	Team Green	4:10	2nd place, silver medalist(s)

== See also ==
- Serbia at the 2020 Summer Olympics
