= Speed skating at the 2020 Winter Youth Olympics – Girls' 500 metres =

Girls' 500 metres at the III Winter Youth Olympic Games
- Venue: Lake St. Moritz
- Date: 12 January
- Competitors: 32 from 17 nations
- Winning time: 40.57

Medalists
1st place, gold medalist(s)		Isabel Grevelt	Netherlands
2nd place, silver medalist(s)		Wang Jingyi	China
3rd place, bronze medalist(s)		Yukino Yoshida	Japan

The girls' 500 metres speed skating competition of the 2020 Winter Youth Olympics was held at Lake St. Moritz on 12 January 2020.

== Results ==
The races were held at 11:30.

Rank	Pair	Lane	Name	Country	Time	Time Behind
1st place, gold medalist(s)	14	o	Isabel Grevelt	Netherlands	40.57	
2nd place, silver medalist(s)	16	o	Wang Jingyi	China	41.07	+0.50
3rd place, bronze medalist(s)	13	i	Yukino Yoshida	Japan	41.16	+0.59
4	14	i	Yang Binyu	China	41.25	+0.68
5	15	i	Kim Min-hui	South Korea	41.60	+1.03
6	13	o	Anna Ostlender	Germany	41.63	+1.06
7	16	i	Myrthe de Boer	Netherlands	41.70	+1.13
8	15	o	Victoria Stirnemann	Germany	41.80	+1.23
9	12	o	Serena Pergher	Italy	42.03	+1.46
10	10	o	Yuka Takahashi	Japan	42.21	+1.64
11	7	i	Luisa González	Spain	42.27	+1.70
12	9	i	Aleksandra Rutkovskaia	Russia	42.57	+2.00
13	11	i	Alina Dauranova	Kazakhstan	42.87	+2.30
14	7	o	Valeriia Sorokoletova	Russia	42.98	+2.41
15	1	i	Kang Soo-min	South Korea	42.99	+2.42
16	12	i	Daria Kopacz	Poland	43.13	+2.56
17	11	o	Laura Kivioja	Finland	43.41	+2.84
18	5	o	Hanna Bíró	Hungary	43.48	+2.91
19	5	i	Ramona Ionel	Romania	43.60	+3.03
20	10	i	Karyna Shypulia	Belarus	43.70	+3.13
21	4	o	Katia Filippi	Italy	43.85	+3.28
22	1	o	Fran Vanhoutte	Belgium	43.99	+3.42
23	8	o	Marta Dobrowolska	Poland	44.03	+3.46
24	6	o	Ilka Füzesy	Romania	44.056	+3.48
25	8	i	Darya Gavrilova	Kazakhstan	44.058	+3.48
26	9	o	Varvara Bandaryna	Belarus	44.06	+3.49
27	2	o	Julie Berg Sjøbrend	Norway	44.11	+3.54
28	6	i	Amalie Haugland	Norway	44.12	+3.55
29	2	i	Carla Álvarez	Spain	44.34	+3.77
30	3	o	Sini Siro	Finland	44.55	+3.98
31	3	i	Zuzana Kuršová	Czech Republic	44.67	+4.10
32	4	i	Kateřina Macháčková	Czech Republic	45.89	+5.32
