= Short-track speed skating at the 2020 Winter Youth Olympics – Girls' 500 metres =

Girls' 500 metres at the III Winter Youth Olympic Games
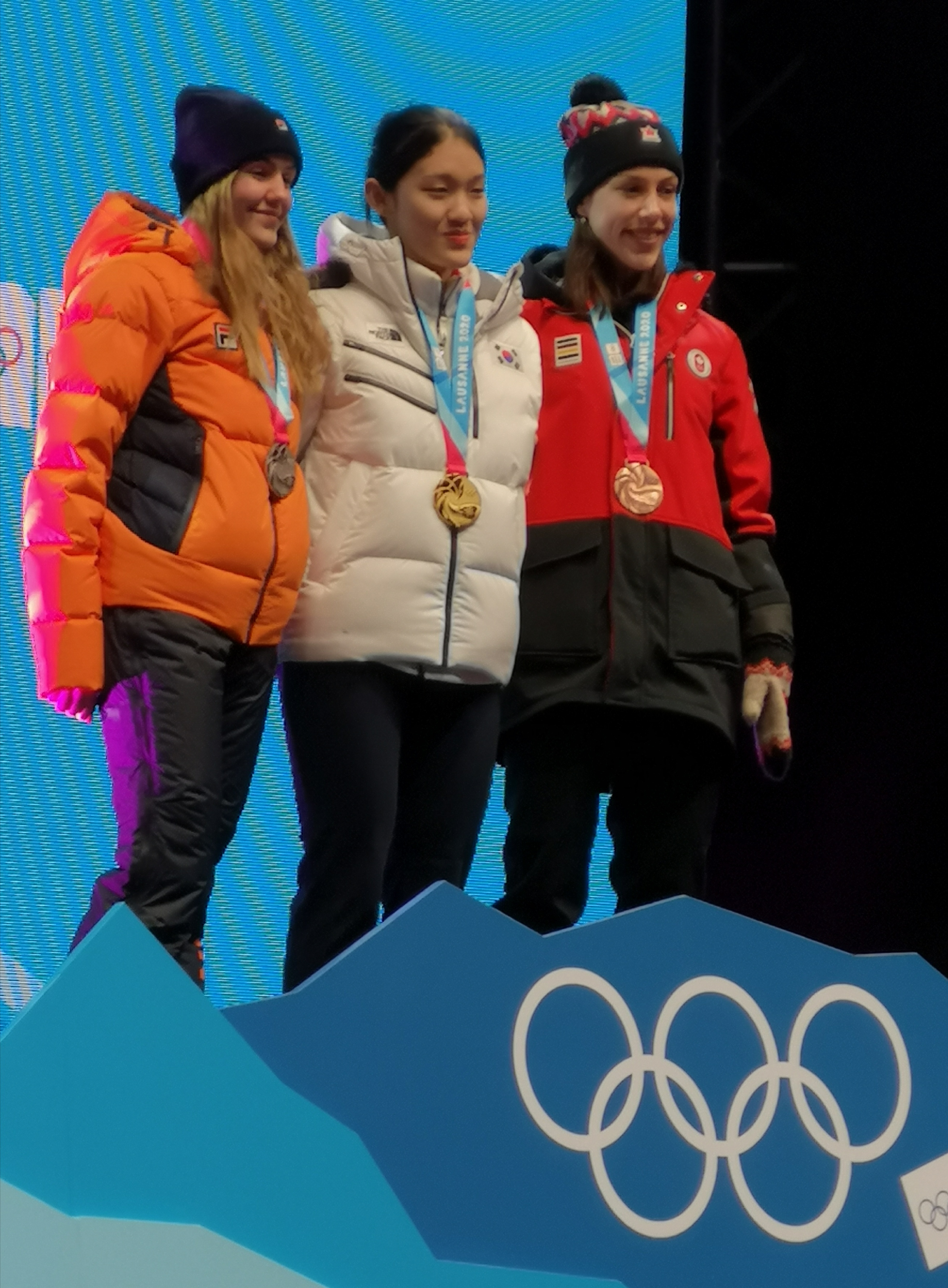
- Venue: Lausanne Skating Arena
- Dates: 20 January
- Competitors: 29 from 25 nations
- Winning time: 43.483

Medalists
1st place, gold medalist(s)		Seo Whi-min	South Korea
2nd place, silver medalist(s)		Michelle Velzeboer	Netherlands
3rd place, bronze medalist(s)		Florence Brunelle	Canada

The girls' 500 metres in short track speed skating at the 2020 Winter Youth Olympics was held on 20 January at the Lausanne Skating Arena.

== Results ==
=== Heats ===
Q – qualified for the quarterfinals

Rank	Heat	Name	Country	Time	Notes
1	1	Petra Rusnáková	Slovakia	45.331	Q
2	1	Cloé Ollivier	France	46.046	Q
3	1	Markéta Fajkusová	Czech Republic	46.259	
1	2	Jenell Berhorst	United States	47.836	Q
2	2	Chang Hui	Chinese Taipei	47.898	Q
3	2	Maja Ivandić	Croatia	48.166	
4	2	Hanna Sokołowska	Poland	DNF	
1	3	Florence Brunelle	Canada	45.408	Q
2	3	Haruna Nagamori	Japan	45.501	Q
3	3	Maria Dobosz	Poland	45.787	
4	3	Petra Jašić	Serbia	48.566	
1	4	Elisa Confortola	Italy	45.683	Q
2	4	Anna Ruysschaert	Luxembourg	46.801	Q
3	4	Tetiana Zarvanska	Ukraine	47.578	
4	4	Alexia Turunen	Switzerland	50.293	
1	5	Michelle Velzeboer	Netherlands	45.048	Q
2	5	Iuliia Beresneva	Russia	45.819	Q
3	5	Betty Moeske	Germany	46.134	
4	5	Alyssa Pok	Singapore	48.044	
1	6	Zhang Chutong	China	44.412	Q
2	6	Hailey Choi	United States	45.013	Q
3	6	Anna Jansone	Latvia	45.873	
1	7	Kim Chan-seo	South Korea	45.972	Q
2	7	Olivia Weedon	Great Britain	47.790	Q
3	7	Dione Tan	Malaysia	48.317	
4	7	Mariya Gorbunova	Kazakhstan	DNF	
1	8	Seo Whi-min	South Korea	44.235	Q
2	8	Barbara Somogyi	Hungary	46.013	Q
3	8	Diede van Oorschot	Netherlands	46.130	

=== Quarterfinals ===
Q – qualified for the semifinals
PEN – penalty

Rank	Heat	Name	Country	Time	Notes
1	1	Michelle Velzeboer	Netherlands	44.414	Q
2	1	Elisa Confortola	Italy	44.452	Q
3	1	Anna Ruysschaert	Luxembourg	47.241	
4	1	Iuliia Beresneva	Russia	DNF	
1	2	Seo Whi-min	South Korea	43.894	Q
2	2	Hailey Choi	United States	44.956	Q
3	2	Jenell Berhorst	United States	46.243	
4	2	Chang Hui	Chinese Taipei	46.837	
1	3	Florence Brunelle	Canada	44.389	Q
2	3	Petra Rusnáková	Slovakia	44.500	Q
3	3	Barbara Somogyi	Hungary	45.203	
4	3	Cloé Ollivier	France	45.624	
1	4	Zhang Chutong	China	44.232	Q
2	4	Kim Chan-seo	South Korea	45.528	Q
3	4	Olivia Weedon	Great Britain	48.037	
	4	Haruna Nagamori	Japan	PEN	

=== Semifinals ===
QA – qualified for Final A
QB – qualified for Final B

Rank	Heat	Name	Country	Time	Notes
1	1	Seo Whi-min	South Korea	43.513	QA
2	1	Michelle Velzeboer	Netherlands	43.777	QA
3	1	Elisa Confortola	Italy	44.734	QB
4	1	Hailey Choi	United States	44.849	QB
1	2	Zhang Chutong	China	43.970	QA
2	2	Florence Brunelle	Canada	44.053	QA
3	2	Kim Chan-seo	South Korea	44.135	QB
4	2	Petra Rusnáková	Slovakia	44.258	QB

=== Final B ===
Rank	Name	Country	Time	Notes
4	Kim Chan-seo	South Korea		
5	Elisa Confortola	Italy	+0.291	
6	Petra Rusnáková	Slovakia	+0.530	
7	Hailey Choi	United States	+0.858	

=== Final A ===
The final A was held at 15:12.

Rank	Name	Country	Time	Notes
1st place, gold medalist(s)	Seo Whi-min	South Korea	43.483	
2nd place, silver medalist(s)	Michelle Velzeboer	Netherlands	45.235	
3rd place, bronze medalist(s)	Florence Brunelle	Canada	45.314	
	Zhang Chutong	China	PEN	
