= Kazakhstan at the 2020 Winter Youth Olympics =

- IOC code: KAZ
- NOC: National Olympic Committee of the Republic of Kazakhstan
- Website: www.olympic.kz

in Lausanne
- Competitors: 26 in 9 sports
- Medals: Gold 0 Silver 0 Bronze 0 Total 0

Winter Youth Olympics appearances (overview)
- 2012; 2016; 2020; 2024

Kazakhstan competed at the 2020 Winter Youth Olympics in Lausanne, Switzerland from 9 to 22 January 2020.

== Alpine skiing ==
Boys

Athlete	Event	Run 1		Run 2		Total	
Athlete	Event	Time	Rank	Time	Rank	Time	Rank
Vladislav Shlemov	Super-G	—N/a				1:01.15	50
Vladislav Shlemov	Combined	1:01.15	50	DNF			
Vladislav Shlemov	Giant slalom	1:11.69	42	1:11.38	38	2:23.07	36
Vladislav Shlemov	Slalom	43.35	41	DQ			

Girls

Athlete	Event	Run 1		Run 2		Total	
Athlete	Event	Time	Rank	Time	Rank	Time	Rank
Alexandra Troitskaya	Super-G	—N/a				1:04.42	45
Alexandra Troitskaya	Combined	1:04.42	45	DNF			
Alexandra Troitskaya	Giant slalom	DNF					
Alexandra Troitskaya	Slalom	DNF					

== Biathlon ==
Boys

Athlete	Event	Time	Misses	Rank
Arseniy Bezginov	Sprint	23:20.1	7 (2+5)	66
Arseniy Bezginov	Individual	38:45.6	6 (3+1+1+1)	34
Danil Chervenko	Sprint	21:42.6	4 (0+4)	33
Danil Chervenko	Individual	39:17.4	6 (0+2+2+2)	41
Vadim Kurales	Sprint	20:48.8	4 (3+1)	18
Vadim Kurales	Individual	38:32.8	7 (3+2+0+2)	32

Girls

Athlete	Event	Time	Misses	Rank
Ulyana Ardalionova	Sprint	20:09.1	1 (1+0)	23
Ulyana Ardalionova	Individual	40:55.6	8 (3+2+0+3)	65
Arina Kupriyanova	Sprint	21:49.4	5 (2+3)	63
Arina Kupriyanova	Individual	41:04.2	10 (3+3+3+1)	67
Vlada Vassillchenko	Sprint	21:47.0	4 (2+2)	62
Vlada Vassillchenko	Individual	42:29.2	12 (3+3+3+3)	73

Mixed

Athletes	Event	Time	Misses	Rank
Ulyana Ardalionova; Vadim Kurales	Single mixed relay	43:45.0	1+14	8
Ulyana Ardalionova; Vlada Vassillchenko; Danil Chervenko; Vadim Kurales	Mixed relay	1:15:42.3	1+14	9

== Cross-country skiing ==
Boys

Athlete	Event	Qualification		Quarterfinal		Semifinal		Final	
Athlete	Event	Time	Rank	Time	Rank	Time	Rank	Time	Rank
Ilyas Issabek	10 km classic	—N/a						30:01.0	37
Ilyas Issabek	Free sprint	3:29.88	37	Did not advance					
Ilyas Issabek	Cross-country cross	4:41.42	42	Did not advance					
Didar Kassenov	10 km classic	—N/a						28:53.1	24
Didar Kassenov	Free sprint	3:36.54	51	Did not advance					
Didar Kassenov	Cross-country cross	4:38.58	36	Did not advance					

Girls

Athlete	Event	Qualification		Quarterfinal		Semifinal		Final	
Athlete	Event	Time	Rank	Time	Rank	Time	Rank	Time	Rank
Valeriya Batchenko	5 km classic	—N/a						17:57.2	57
Valeriya Batchenko	Free sprint	3:05.15	45	Did not advance					
Valeriya Batchenko	Cross-country cross	6:07.06	62	Did not advance					
Aisha Rakisheva	5 km classic	—N/a						15:51.2	25
Aisha Rakisheva	Free sprint	2:59.20	32	Did not advance					
Aisha Rakisheva	Cross-country cross	5:21.54	21	—N/a		5:16.82	8	Did not advance	23

== Freestyle skiing ==
Ski cross

Athlete	Event	Group heats		Semifinal	Final
Athlete	Event	Points	Rank	Position	Position
Anel Sufashova	Girls' ski cross	10	11	Did not advance	

== Ice hockey ==
=== Mixed NOC 3x3 tournament ===
Boys

- Alexei Baidek

Girls

- Kristina Chernova

== Nordic combined ==
Individual

Athlete	Event	Ski jumping				Cross-country	
Athlete	Event	Distance	Points	Rank	Deficit	Time	Rank
Svyatoslav Nazarenko	Boys' normal hill/6 km	64.5	64.9	27	3:43	22:31.4	27

== Short track speed skating ==
Boys

Athlete	Event	Heats		Quarterfinal		Semifinal		Final	
Athlete	Event	Time	Rank	Time	Rank	Time	Rank	Time	Rank
Sanzhar Zhanissov	500 m	43.141	2 Q	42.973	3	Did not advance			12
Sanzhar Zhanissov	1000 m	1:37.947	2 Q	1:32.521	3	Did not advance			12

Girls

Athlete	Event	Heats		Quarterfinal		Semifinal		Final	
Athlete	Event	Time	Rank	Time	Rank	Time	Rank	Time	Rank
Mariya Gorbunobva	500 m	DNF	4	Did not advance					28
Mariya Gorbunobva	1000 m	1:46.899	2 Q	1:41.491	4	Did not advance			16

== Ski jumping ==
Athlete	Event	First round			Final			Total	
Athlete	Event	Distance	Points	Rank	Distance	Points	Rank	Points	Rank
Nurshat Tursunzhanov	Boys' normal hill	70.0	89.6	26	78.0	93.5	25	183.1	26
Danil Vassilyev	Boys' normal hill	87.0	110.7	9	85.5	110.1	12	220.8	9
Veronika Shishkina	Girls' normal hill	72.5	97.8	11	73.0	78.0	18	175.8	17
Amina Tukhtayeva	Girls' normal hill	61.0	57.5	32	64.5	61.0	27	118.5	29

== Speed skating ==
Boys

Athlete	Event	Time	Rank
Nuraly Akzhol	500 m	40.07	26
Nuraly Akzhol	1500 m	2:02.73	20
Yevgeniy Koshkin	500 m	39.01	21
Yevgeniy Koshkin	1500 m	2:08.00	31

Girls

Athlete	Event	Time	Rank
Alina Dauranova	500 m	42.87	13
Alina Dauranova	1500 m	2:18.82	15
Darya Gavrilova	500 m	44.058	25
Darya Gavrilova	1500 m	2:17.06	11

Mass Start

Athlete	Event	Semifinal			Final		
Athlete	Event	Points	Time	Rank	Points	Time	Rank
Nuraly Akzhol	Boys' mass start	1	6:38.94	9	Did not advance		
Yevgeniy Koshkin	Boys' mass start	0	6:09.83	15	Did not advance		
Alina Dauranova	Girls' mass start	2	6:53.29	9	Did not advance		
Darya Gavrilova	Girls' mass start	0	6:27.57	14	Did not advance		

Mixed

Athlete	Event	Time	Rank
Team 4 Carla Álvarez (ESP); Yang Binyu (CHN); Filip Hawryłak (POL); Nuraly Akzhol (KAZ)	Mixed team sprint	2:10.67	13
Team 8 Darya Gavrilova (KAZ); Victoria Stirnemann (GER); Flavio Gross (SUI); Sun Jiazhao (CHN)	Mixed team sprint	2:07.71	8
Team 13; Karyna Shypulia (BLR); Alina Dauranova (KAZ); Xue Shiwen (CHN); Diego Amaya (COL)	Mixed team sprint	DQ	
Team 15; Hanna Bíró (HUN); Kang Soo-min (KOR); Yevgeniy Koshkin (KAZ); Pavel Taran (RUS)	Mixed team sprint	2:07.27	6

== See also ==
- Kazakhstan at the 2020 Summer Olympics
