= Netherlands at the 2020 Winter Youth Olympics =

- IOC code: NED
- NOC: NOC*NSF
- Website: www.nocnsf.nl

in Lausanne
- Competitors: 15 in 4 sports
- Medals Ranked 13th: Gold 2 Silver 2 Bronze 1 Total 5

Winter Youth Olympics appearances
- 2012; 2016; 2020; 2024

Netherlands competed at the 2020 Winter Youth Olympics in Lausanne, Switzerland from 9 to 22 January 2020.

== Medalists ==
Medal	Name	Sport	Event	Date
Gold	Isabel Grevelt	Speed skating	Girls' 500 metres	12 January
Gold	Myrthe de Boer	Speed skating	Girls' 1500 metres	13 January
Gold	Iris van Houten	Ice hockey	Girls' 3x3 mixed tournament	15 January
Silver	Dylan Wesseling	Ice hockey	Boys' 3x3 mixed tournament	15 January
Silver	Kimberly Collard	Ice hockey	Girls' 3x3 mixed tournament	15 January
Silver	Melissa Peperkamp	Snowboarding	Girls' slopestyle	18 January
Silver	Michelle Velzeboer	Short track speed skating	Girls' 500 metres	20 January
Bronze	Melissa Peperkamp	Snowboarding	Girls' big air	22 January

== Short track speed skating ==
Three skaters achieved quota places for Netherlands based on the results of the 2019 World Junior Short Track Speed Skating Championships.

Boys

Athlete	Event	Heats		Quarterfinal		Semifinal		Final	
Athlete	Event	Time	Rank	Time	Rank	Time	Rank	Time	Rank
Jenning de Boo	500 m	41.973	3	did not advance					
Jenning de Boo	1000 m	1:41.247	2	1:35.114	4	did not advance			

Girls

Athlete	Event	Heats		Quarterfinal		Semifinal		Final	
Athlete	Event	Time	Rank	Time	Rank	Time	Rank	Time	Rank
Michelle Velzeboer	500 m	45.048	1	44.414	1	43.777	2	45.235	2nd place, silver medalist(s)
Michelle Velzeboer	1000 m	1:44.657	1	1:39.730	2	1:34.733	4	1:33.773	7
Diede van Oorschot	500 m	46.130	3	did not advance					
Diede van Oorschot	1000 m	1:35.857	2	1:33.131	3	did not advance			

== Snowboarding ==
Halfpipe, Slopestyle, & Big Air

Athlete	Event	Qualification				Final				
Athlete	Event	Run 1	Run 2	Best	Rank	Run 1	Run 2	Run 3	Best	Rank
Melissa Peperkamp	Girls' big air	82.00	57.00	82.00	2	80.75	69.25	18.50	150.00	3rd place, bronze medalist(s)
Melissa Peperkamp	Girls' slopestyle	76.50	18.75	76.50	2	79.25	91.75	16.25	91.75	2nd place, silver medalist(s)

== Speed skating ==
Four skaters achieved quota places for Netherlands based on the results of the 2019 World Junior Speed Skating Championships.

Boys

Athlete	Event	Final	
Athlete	Event	Time	Rank
Remo Slotegraaf	500 m	38.68	17
Remo Slotegraaf	1500 m	1:56.87	5
Sebas Diniz	500 m	2:11.01	31
Sebas Diniz	1500 m	1:59.47	11

Girls

Athlete	Event	Final	
Athlete	Event	Time	Rank
Isabel Grevelt	500 m	40.57	1st place, gold medalist(s)
Isabel Grevelt	1500 m	2:14.56	7
Myrthe de Boer	500 m	41.70	7
Myrthe de Boer	1500 m	2:10.44	1st place, gold medalist(s)

Mass Start

Athlete	Event	Semifinal			Final		
Athlete	Event	Points	Time	Rank	Points	Time	Rank
Remo Slotegraaf	Boys' mass start	5	5:55.13	5 Q	1	6:37.71	9
Sebas Diniz	Boys' mass start	4	6:33.04	4 Q	0	6:40.58	16
Myrthe de Boer	Girls' mass start	DNS					
Yukino Yoshida	Girls' mass start	3	6:24.88	7 Q	0	6:53.07	10

Mixed

Athlete	Event	Time	Rank
Team 7 Varvara Bandaryna (BLR); Myrthe de Boer (NED); Lukáš Steklý (CZE); Yudai Yamamoto (JPN)	Mixed team sprint	2:06.80	5
Team 1 Kateřina Macháčková (CZE); Isabel Grevelt (NED); Max Fiodarav (BLR); Felix Motschmann (GER)	Mixed team sprint	2:08.16	9
Team 12; Katia Filippi (ITA); Aleksandra Rutkovskaia (RUS); Eetu Käsnänen (FIN); Remo Slotegraaf (NED)	Mixed team sprint	2:10.07	12
Team 6 Julie Berg Sjøbrend (NOR); Anna Ostlender (GER); Jakub Kočí (CZE); Sebas Diniz (NED)	Mixed team sprint	Disqualified	

== See also ==
- Netherlands at the 2020 Summer Olympics
