= Great Britain at the 2020 Winter Youth Olympics =

- IOC code: GBR
- NOC: British Olympic Association
- Website: www.teamgb.com

in Lausanne
- Competitors: 28 in 11 sports
- Medals Ranked 27th: Gold 0 Silver 1 Bronze 0 Total 1

Winter Youth Olympics appearances (overview)
- 2012; 2016; 2020; 2024

Great Britain competed at the 2020 Winter Youth Olympics in Lausanne, Switzerland from 9 to 22 January 2020.

== Medalists ==
Medal	Name	Sport	Event	Date
Silver	Kirsty Muir	Freestyle skiing	Girls' big air	22 January

=== Medalists in mixed NOCs events ===
Medal	Name	Sport	Event	Date
Silver	Theo Collins	Speed skating	Mixed team sprint	15 January
Silver	Mackenzie Stewart	Ice hockey	Boys' 3x3 mixed tournament	15 January
Silver	Amy Robery	Ice hockey	Girls' 3x3 mixed tournament	15 January
Bronze	Evan Nauth	Ice hockey	Boys' 3x3 mixed tournament	15 January
Bronze	Mirren Foy	Ice hockey	Girls' 3x3 mixed tournament	15 January

== Alpine skiing ==
Boys

Athlete	Event	Run 1		Run 2		Total	
Athlete	Event	Time	Rank	Time	Rank	Time	Rank
Jack Cunningham	Super-G	—N/a				56.36	26
Jack Cunningham	Combined	56.36	26	DNF			
Jack Cunningham	Giant slalom	DNF					
Jack Cunningham	Slalom	DNF					
Robert Holmes	Super-G	—N/a				DNF	
Robert Holmes	Combined	DNF					
Robert Holmes	Giant slalom	1:06.25	23	1:06.03	18	2:12.28	20
Robert Holmes	Slalom	38.96	19	DSQ			

Girls

Athlete	Event	Run 1		Run 2		Total	
Athlete	Event	Time	Rank	Time	Rank	Time	Rank
Daisi Daniels	Super-G	—N/a				57.82	18
Daisi Daniels	Combined	57.82	18	DNF			
Daisi Daniels	Giant slalom	1:07.39	23	DNF			
Daisi Daniels	Slalom	DNF					
Sophie Foster	Super-G	—N/a				1:00.33	33
Sophie Foster	Combined	1:00.33	33	39.98	18	1:40.31	23
Sophie Foster	Giant slalom	1:09.36	31	DNF			
Sophie Foster	Slalom	49.29	28	47.76	21	1:37.05	20

== Biathlon ==
Athlete	Event	Time	Misses	Rank
Shawna Pendry	Girls' sprint	19:47.3	1 (0+1)	12
Shawna Pendry	Girls' individual	38:13.7	6 (0+2+1+3)	39

== Bobsleigh ==
Athlete	Event	Run 1		Run 2		Total	
Athlete	Event	Time	Rank	Time	Rank	Time	Rank
William Scammell	Boys'	1:14.24	11	1:14.02	12	2:28.26	12
Charlotte Longden	Girls'	1:15.45	13	1:14.75	10	2:30.20	12

== Cross-country skiing ==
Athlete	Event	Qualification		Quarterfinal		Semifinal		Final	
Athlete	Event	Time	Rank	Time	Rank	Time	Rank	Time	Rank
James Slimon	Boys' 10 km classic	—N/a						32:35.7	64
James Slimon	Boys' sprint	3:47.86	63	Did not advance					
James Slimon	Boys' cross-country cross	5:05.80	67	Did not advance					
Molly Jefferies	Girls' 5 km classic	—N/a						18:00.1	59
Molly Jefferies	Girls' sprint	3:06.54	48	Did not advance					
Molly Jefferies	Girls' cross-country cross	5:48.28	51	Did not advance					

== Curling ==
=== Mixed team ===
Summary

Team	Event	Group stage						Quarterfinal	Semifinal	Final / BM	
Team	Event	Opposition Score	Opposition Score	Opposition Score	Opposition Score	Opposition Score	Rank	Opposition Score	Opposition Score	Opposition Score	Rank
Ross Craik; Robyn Mitchell; Jamie Rankin; Hannah Farries	Mixed team	France; W 9–5	Turkey; L 1–5	Norway; L 3–8	Slovenia; W 6–2	New Zealand; W 9–7	3	Did not advance			11

=== Mixed doubles ===
Summary

Athletes	Event	Round of 48	Round of 24	Round of 12	Round of 6	Semifinals	Final / BM	
Athletes	Event	Opposition Result	Opposition Result	Opposition Result	Opposition Result	Opposition Result	Opposition Result	Rank
Natalie Asp Wiksten (DEN); Ross Craik (GBR)	Mixed doubles	Tabata (JPN); Mäesalu (EST); W 8–6	Farková (CZE); Landelius (SWE); L 6–12	Did not advance				13
Hannah Farries (GBR); Kadir Polat (TUR)	Mixed doubles	Murphy (USA); Neuert (CAN); L 4–8	Did not advance					25
Robyn Mitchell (GBR); František Jiral (CZE)	Mixed doubles	Rigler (SLO); Kapp (GER); W 8–5	Park (KOR); Kamiński (POL); W 6–5	Nagy (HUN); Young (CAN); L 4–7	Did not advance			7
Klaudia Szmidt (POL); Jamie Rankin (GBR)	Mixed doubles	Fakhrutdinova (RUS); Melo (BRA); W 8–2	Şengül (TUR); Moberg (SWE); W 11–6	Kobayashi (JPN); Tuaz (FRA); L 2–9	Did not advance			7

== Freestyle skiing ==
Park & Pipe

Athlete	Event	Qualification				Final				
Athlete	Event	Run 1	Run 2	Best	Rank	Run 1	Run 2	Run 3	Best	Rank
Jasper Klein	Boys' big air	76.25	15.25	76.25	10 Q	61.25	72.50	36.25	133.75	9
Jasper Klein	Boys' slopestyle	61.00	61.66	61.66	14	Did not advance				
Kirsty Muir	Girls' big air	81.33	68.66	81.33	3 Q	82.50	78.50	87.50	170.00	2nd place, silver medalist(s)
Kirsty Muir	Girls' slopestyle	13.25	77.50	77.50	4 Q	86.25	70.00	86.00	86.25	4

Ski cross

Athlete	Event	Group heats		Semifinal	Final
Athlete	Event	Points	Rank	Position	Position
Scott Johns	Boys' ski cross	15	6	Did not advance	

== Ice hockey ==
- Mirren Foy
- Carter Hamill
- Evan Nauth
- Amy Robery
- Abby Rowbotham
- Mackenzie Stewart
- Jessie Taylor

== Nordic combined ==
Individual

Athlete	Event	Ski jumping				Cross-country	
Athlete	Event	Distance	Points	Rank	Deficit	Time	Rank
Mani Cooper	Girls' Normal hill/4 km	69.0	85.3	16	2.04	15:06.8	19

== Short track speed skating ==
Boys

Athlete	Event	Heats		Quarterfinal		Semifinal		Final	
Athlete	Event	Time	Rank	Time	Rank	Time	Rank	Time	Rank
Matthew Gardner	500 m	45.460	4	Did not advance					
Matthew Gardner	1000 m	1:33.05	4	Did not advance					

Girls

Athlete	Event	Heats		Quarterfinal		Semifinal		Final	
Athlete	Event	Time	Rank	Time	Rank	Time	Rank	Time	Rank
Olivia Weedon	500 m	47.790	2 Q	48.037	3	Did not advance			
Olivia Weedon	1000 m	1:37.974	4	Did not advance					

== Ski jumping ==
Athlete	Event	First round			Final			Total	
Athlete	Event	Distance	Points	Rank	Distance	Points	Rank	Points	Rank
Sam Bolton	Boys' normal hill	86.5	97.7	23	82.0	102.2	17	199.9	18

== Speed skating ==
Boys

Athlete	Event	Semifinal		Final	
Athlete	Event	Time	Rank	Time	Rank
Theo Collins	500 m	—N/a		40.59	28
Theo Collins	1500 m	—N/a		2:09.43	32
Theo Collins	Mass start	5:58.38	13	Did not advance	

== See also ==
- Great Britain at the 2020 Summer Olympics
