= Romania at the 2020 Winter Youth Olympics =

- IOC code: ROU
- NOC: Romanian Olympic and Sports Committee
- Website: www.cosr.ro

in Lausanne
- Competitors: 35 in 10 sports
- Flag bearer: Constantin Surdu
- Medals: Gold 2 Silver 0 Bronze 0 Total 2

Winter Youth Olympics appearances
- 2012; 2016; 2020; 2024

Romania competed at the 2020 Winter Youth Olympics in Lausanne, Switzerland from 9 to 22 January 2020.

== Medalists ==
Medals awarded to participants of mixed-NOC teams are represented in italics. These medals are not counted towards the individual NOC medal tally.

Medal	Name	Sport	Event	Date
Gold	Andrei Nica	Bobsleigh	Boy's monobob	20 January
Gold	Georgeta Popescu	Bobsleigh	Girl's monobob	19 January
Bronze	Ramona Ionel	Speed skating	Mixed team sprint	15 January

== Alpine skiing ==
Boys

Athlete	Event	Run 1		Run 2		Total	
Athlete	Event	Time	Rank	Time	Rank	Time	Rank
Andrei Tudor Stanescu	Super-G	—				58.52	42
Andrei Tudor Stanescu	Combined	58.52	42	DNF			
Andrei Tudor Stanescu	Giant slalom	1:09.66	39	1:09.90	32	2:19.56	33
Andrei Tudor Stanescu	Slalom	42.49	38	45.71	32	1:28.20	30

Girls

Athlete	Event	Run 1		Run 2		Total	
Athlete	Event	Time	Rank	Time	Rank	Time	Rank
Diana Andreea Rentea	Super-G	—				1:01.88	40
Diana Andreea Rentea	Combined	1:01.88	40	43.30	31	1:45.18	29
Diana Andreea Rentea	Giant slalom	1:13.69	42	1:10.88	31	2:24.57	31
Diana Andreea Rentea	Slalom	DNF					

== Biathlon ==
Boys

Athlete	Event	Time	Misses	Rank
Marian Folea	Sprint	25:37.2	9 (4+5)	91
Marian Folea	Individual	43:03.3	10 (3+1+4+2)	79
Zalán Kovács	Sprint	22:47.0	3 (0+3)	54
Zalán Kovács	Individual	DSQ		
Nicolae Girbacea	Sprint	23:25.4	5 (3+2)	69
Nicolae Girbacea	Individual	41:59.8	8 (2+3+1+2)	67

Girls

Athlete	Event	Time	Misses	Rank
Zsulett Demian	Sprint	25:18.8	4 (2+2)	86
Zsulett Demian	Individual	47:13.5	10 (2+1+4+3)	88
Blanka Borbely	Sprint	24:09.1	3 (0+3)	84
Blanka Borbely	Individual	45:26.9	9 (1+4+0+4)	86
Andrea Csutak	Sprint	23:45.2	3 (2+1)	81
Andrea Csutak	Individual	42:34.3	8 (2+4+0+2)	74

Mixed

Athletes	Event	Time	Misses	Rank
Andrea Csutak; Nicolae Girbacea	Single mixed relay	47:42.9	19 (3+16)	20
Andrea Csutak; Blanka Borbély; Zalán Kovács; Nicolae Girbacea	Mixed relay	1:27:14.9	28 (8+20)	22

== Bobsleigh ==
Athlete	Event	Run 1		Run 2		Total	
Athlete	Event	Time	Rank	Time	Rank	Time	Rank
Andrei Nica	Boys'	1:12.81	2	1:11:99	1	2:24.80	1st place, gold medalist(s)
Georgeta Popescu	Girls'	1:13.44	1	1:13.40	1	2:26.84	1st place, gold medalist(s)
Antonia Sârbu	Girls'	1:15.20	11	1:15.51	13	2:30.71	13

== Cross-country skiing ==
Boys

Athlete	Event	Qualification		Quarterfinal		Semifinal		Final	
Athlete	Event	Time	Rank	Time	Rank	Time	Rank	Time	Rank
Flaviu Păvălean	10 km classic	—						34:22.7	72
Flaviu Păvălean	Free sprint	3:35.04	48	Did not advance					
Flaviu Păvălean	Cross-country cross	4:55.76	57	—		Did not advance			
Liviu Hăngănuț	10 km classic	—						DNF	
Liviu Hăngănuț	Free sprint	3:33.49	45	Did not advance					
Liviu Hăngănuț	Cross-country cross	5:15.15	73	—		Did not advance			

== Ice hockey ==
=== Mixed NOC 3x3 tournament ===
Boys

- Csongor Antal

Girls

- Sonja David
- Emilia Munteanu

== Luge ==
Boys

Athlete	Event	Run 1		Run 2		Total	
Athlete	Event	Time	Rank	Time	Rank	Time	Rank
Darius Lucian Serban	Singles	55.345	13	56.652	24	1:51.997	17
Răzvan Turea; Sebastian Motzca	Doubles	DNS					

Girls

Athlete	Event	Run 1		Run 2		Total	
Athlete	Event	Time	Rank	Time	Rank	Time	Rank
Corina Buzățoiu	Singles	55.646	8	55.227	7	1:50.873	6
Petra Tolomey; Daria Căciulan	Doubles	57.488	8	57.303	7	1:54.791	8

Mixed team relay

Athlete	Event	Girls' singles	Boys' singles	Doubles	Total	
Athlete	Event	Time	Time	Time	Time	Rank
Corina Buzățoiu; Darius Şerban; Răzvan Turea; Sebastian Motzca	Team relay	57.941	1:00.016	1:00.325	2:58.282	5

== Ski jumping ==
Boys

Athlete	Event	First round			Final			Total	
Athlete	Event	Distance	Points	Rank	Distance	Points	Rank	Points	Rank
Florin Feroiu	Normal hill	72.0	76.4	31	66.0	75.7	32	152.1	31
Robert Săndulescu	Normal hill	62.5	52.0	35	59.5	68.2	36	120.2	35

Girls

Athlete	Event	First round			Final			Total	
Athlete	Event	Distance	Points	Rank	Distance	Points	Rank	Points	Rank
Delia Folea	Normal hill	64.0	64.8	26	63.0	68.0	23	132.8	25
Maria Chindriş	Normal hill	56.5	61.9	29	54.5	34.2	32	96.1	32

== Ski mountaineering ==
Individual

Athlete	Event	Time	Rank
Constantin Surdu	Boys' individual	55:56.52	14
George Petruţ Cotinghiu	Boys' individual	1:05:57.53	22
Anca Alexandra Olaru	Girls' individual	1:15:38.94	17
Larisa Daniela Coşofreţ	Girls' individual	1:16:19.64	18

Sprint

Athlete	Event	Qualification		Quarterfinal		Semifinal		Final	
Athlete	Event	Time	Rank	Time	Rank	Time	Rank	Time	Rank
Constantin Surdu	Boys' sprint	3:07.74	15	3:11.28	21	Did not advance			
George Petruţ Cotinghiu	Boys' sprint	3:20.58	22	3:13.25	22	Did not advance			
Anca Alexandra Olaru	Girls' sprint	4:19.93	21	4:20.60	22	Did not advance			
Larisa Daniela Coşofreţ	Girls' sprint	3:50.32	10	3:45.60	13	Did not advance			

Mixed

Athlete	Event	Time	Rank
Larisa Daniela Coşofreţ; George Petruţ Cotinghiu; Anca Alexandra Olaru; Constantin Surdu	Mixed relay	45:11	11

== Snowboarding ==
Snowboard cross

Athlete	Event	Group heats		Semifinal	Final
Athlete	Event	Points	Rank	Position	Position
Silviu Popa	Boys' snowboard cross	10	11	Did not advance	

Athlete	Event	Pre-Heats	Quarterfinals	Semifinal	Final
Athlete	Event	Position	Position	Position	Position
Mixed Team 12; Zsófia Vincze (HUN); Marta Rihtaršič (SLO); Silviu Popa (ROU); Isbat Hoque (HUN)	Team snowboard ski cross	2 Q	4	Did not advance	

== Speed skating ==
Girls

Athlete	Event	Time	Rank
Ramona Ionel	500 m	43.60	19
Ramona Ionel	1500 m	2:20.21	21
Ilka Füzesy	500 m	44.056	24
Ilka Füzesy	1500 m	2:20.58	23

Mass Start

Athlete	Event	Semifinal			Final		
Athlete	Event	Points	Time	Rank	Points	Time	Rank
Ramona Ionel	Girls' mass start	0	7:02.43	13	Did not advance		
Ilka Füzesy	Girls' mass start	0	6:26.66	13	Did not advance		

Mixed

Athlete	Event	Time	Rank
Team 14; Ramona Ionel (ROU); Valeriia Sorokoletova (RUS); Tuukka Suomalainen (FIN); Jonathan Tobon (USA)	Mixed team sprint	2:05.96	3rd place, bronze medalist(s)
Team 9 Serena Pergher (ITA); Ilka Füzesy (ROU); Yang Suk-hoon (KOR); Nil Llop (ESP)	Mixed team sprint	2:06.33	4

== See also ==
- Romania at the 2020 Summer Olympics
