= Belgium at the 2020 Winter Youth Olympics =

- IOC code: BEL
- NOC: Belgian Olympic Committee
- Website: www.teambelgium.be

in Lausanne
- Competitors: 9 in 7 sports
- Medals: Gold 1 Silver 0 Bronze 0 Total 1

Winter Youth Olympics appearances (overview)
- 2012; 2016; 2020; 2024

Belgium competed at the 2020 Winter Youth Olympics in Lausanne, Switzerland from 9 to 22 January 2020.

== Medalists ==
Medals awarded to participants of mixed-NOC teams are represented in italics. These medals are not counted towards the individual NOC medal tally.

Medal	Name	Sport	Event	Date
Gold	Anke Steeno	Ice hockey	Girls' 3x3 mixed tournament	15 January
Gold	Evy Poppe	Snowboarding	Girls' slopestyle	18 January

== Alpine skiing ==
Boys

Athlete	Event	Run 1		Run 2		Total	
Athlete	Event	Time	Rank	Time	Rank	Time	Rank
Louis Masquelier-Page	Super-G	—N/a				58.58	44
Louis Masquelier-Page	Combined	58.58	44	36.42	26	1:35.00	28
Louis Masquelier-Page	Giant slalom	1:05.60	20	1:07.39	24	2:12.99	23
Louis Masquelier-Page	Slalom	DNF					

== Freestyle skiing ==
Ski cross

Athlete	Event	Group heats		Semifinal	Final
Athlete	Event	Points	Rank	Position	Position
Noa Spoelders	Girls' ski cross	14	7	DNQ	

== Ice hockey ==
=== Mixed NOC 3x3 tournament ===
Boys

- Tibo Van Reeth

Girls

- Anke Steeno

== Short track speed skating ==
Boys

Athlete	Event	Quarterfinal		Semifinal		Final	
Athlete	Event	Time	Rank	Time	Rank	Time	Rank
Warre Van Damme	500 m	DNQ					
Warre Van Damme	1000 m	DNQ					

== Skeleton ==
Athlete	Event	Run 1		Run 2		Total	
Athlete	Event	Time	Rank	Time	Rank	Time	Rank
Colin Freeling	Boys	1:11.06	12	1:10.81	8	1:21.55	10
Aline Pelckmans	Girls	1:13.05	13	1:12.94	11	2:25.99	11

== Snowboarding ==
Halfpipe, Slopestyle, & Big Air

Athlete	Event	Qualification				Final				
Athlete	Event	Run 1	Run 2	Best	Rank	Run 1	Run 2	Run 3	Best	Rank
Evy Poppe	Girls' big air	69.33	65.00	69.33	6	28.75	8.75	16.25	45.00	10
Evy Poppe	Girls' slopestyle	46.25	83.50	83.50	6	88.75	22.25	94.00	94.00	1st place, gold medalist(s)

== Speed skating ==
Girls

Athlete	Event	Time	Rank
Fran Vanhoutte	500 m	43.99	22
Fran Vanhoutte	1500 m	2:16.82	8

Mass Start

Athlete	Event	Semifinal			Final		
Athlete	Event	Points	Time	Rank	Points	Time	Rank
Fran Vanhoutte	Girls' mass start	21	6:49.87	2 Q	0	6:52.72	9

Mixed

Athlete	Event	Time	Rank
Team 11; Luisa González (ESP); Fran Vanhoutte (BEL); Nicky Rosanelli (ITA); Sander Eitrem (NOR)	Mixed team sprint	2:07.46	7

== See also ==
- Belgium at the 2020 Summer Olympics
