= Poland at the 2020 Winter Youth Olympics =

- IOC code: POL
- NOC: Polish Olympic Committee
- Website: www.pkol.pl

in Lausanne
- Medals: Gold 1 Silver 0 Bronze 0 Total 1

Winter Youth Olympics appearances
- 2012; 2016; 2020; 2024

Poland competed at the 2020 Winter Youth Olympics in Lausanne, Switzerland from 9 to 22 January 2020.

== Medalists ==
| Medal | Name | Sport | Event | Date |
|---|---|---|---|---|
| Gold | Marcin Zawół | Biathlon | Boys' sprint | 14 January |
| Silver | Daria Kopacz | Speed skating | Mixed team sprint | 15 February |
| Silver | Aleks Menc | Ice hockey | Boys' 3x3 mixed tournament | 15 January |
| Silver | Alicja Mota | Ice hockey | Girls' 3x3 mixed tournament | 15 January |
| Bronze | Anna Kot | Ice hockey | Girls' 3x3 mixed tournament | 15 January |

== Olympic Crew ==
Polish Olympic Chief during 2020 Winter Youth Olympics is Konrad Niedźwiedzki, bronze medalist in long track speed skating on 2014 Winter Olympics in Sochi, Russia. His assistants are: Luiza Złotkowska (also speed skater) and Marcin Doroś. Press attachés are: Szymon Sikora and Tomasz Piechal. Poland sends also 2 medics: Edyta Śleszycka and Jarosław Bortnowski supported by 2 physiotherapists: Magdalena Gąsowska and Mateusz Ołownia.

== Alpine skiing ==
Boys

| Athlete | Event | Run 1 | | Run 2 | | Total | |
| Athlete | Event | Time | Rank | Time | Rank | Time | Rank |
|---|---|---|---|---|---|---|---|
| Bartłomiej Sanetra | Super-G | — | | | | 57.38 | 33 |
| Bartłomiej Sanetra | Combined | 57.38 | 33 | 35.88 | 22 | 1:33.26 | 21 |
| Bartłomiej Sanetra | Giant slalom | 1:06.59 | 26 | 1:05.26 | 11 | 2:11.85 | 18 |
| Bartłomiej Sanetra | Slalom | | | | | | |

Girls

| Athlete | Event | Run 1 | | Run 2 | | Total | |
| Athlete | Event | Time | Rank | Time | Rank | Time | Rank |
|---|---|---|---|---|---|---|---|
| Gabriela Hopek | Super-G | — | | | | 1:05.37 | 47 |
| Gabriela Hopek | Combined | 1:05.37 | 47 | DNF | | | |
| Gabriela Hopek | Giant slalom | 1:12.05 | 40 | 1:09.01 | 25 | 2:21.06 | 29 |
| Gabriela Hopek | Slalom | | | | | | |

== Biathlon ==
Boys

| Athlete | Event | Time | Misses | Rank |
|---|---|---|---|---|
| Konrad Badacz | Sprint | 20:27.2 | 3 (1+2) | 15 |
| Konrad Badacz | Individual | 38:04.8 | 7 (3+3+0+1) | 24 |
| Jan Guńka | Sprint | 20:21.4 | 4 (1+3) | 13 |
| Jan Guńka | Individual | 36:08.1 | 6 (0+4+2+0) | 10 |
| Marcin Zawół | Sprint | 19:23.8 | 1 (0+1) | 1st place, gold medalist(s) |
| Marcin Zawół | Individual | 36:09.3 | 4 (1+1+0+2) | 11 |

Girls

| Athlete | Event | Time | Misses | Rank |
|---|---|---|---|---|
| Anna Nędza-Kubiniec | Sprint | 21:46.6 | 6 (3+3) | 61 |
| Anna Nędza-Kubiniec | Individual | 38:30.8 | 8 (2+3+1+2) | 42 |
| Justyna Panterałka | Sprint | 21:45.4 | 3 (1+2) | 58 |
| Justyna Panterałka | Individual | 37:54.1 | 5 (0+1+1+3) | 34 |
| Klaudia Topór | Sprint | 19:42.6 | 1 (0+1) | 10 |
| Klaudia Topór | Individual | 37:22.6 | 5 (0+1+1+3) | 26 |

Mixed

| Athletes | Event | Time | Misses | Rank |
|---|---|---|---|---|
| Anna Nędza-Kubiniec; Marcin Zawół | Single mixed relay | 44:42.8 | 2+13 | 13 |
| Klaudia Topór; Justyna Panterałka; Jan Guńka; Marcin Zawół | Mixed relay | 1:13:32.4 | 0+13 | 6 |

== Curling ==
Poland for 2020 Winter Youth Olympics sends a mixed team of four athletes: Klaudia Szmidt, Monika Wosińska, Robert Kamiński, Dominik Szmidt. They will be supported by their coach, Damian Herman.

Mixed team

| Team | Event | Group Stage | | | | | | Quarterfinal | Semifinal | Final / BM | |
| Team | Event | Opposition Score | Opposition Score | Opposition Score | Opposition Score | Opposition Score | Rank | Opposition Score | Opposition Score | Opposition Score | Rank |
|---|---|---|---|---|---|---|---|---|---|---|---|
| Monika Wosińska; Dominik Szmidt; Klaudia Szmidt; Robert Kamiński | Mixed team | Spain; W 9 – 6 | Canada; L 4 – 6 | Estonia; W 9 – 3 | South Korea; L 3 – 5 | Russia; L 2 – 5 | 4 | did not advance | | | 15 |

Mixed doubles

| Athletes | Event | Round of 48 | Round of 24 | Round of 12 | Round of 6 | Semifinals | Final / BM | |
| Athletes | Event | Opposition Result | Opposition Result | Opposition Result | Opposition Result | Opposition Result | Opposition Result | Rank |
|---|---|---|---|---|---|---|---|---|
| | Mixed doubles | | | | | | | |

== Figure skating ==
One female Polish Skater earned a spot based on the 2019–20 ISU Junior Grand Prix.

== Short track speed skating ==
Three Polish skaters achieved quota places for Poland based on the results of the 2019 World Junior Short Track Speed Skating Championships.

Boys

| Athlete | Event | Quarterfinal | | Semifinal | | Final | |
| Athlete | Event | Time | Rank | Time | Rank | Time | Rank |
|---|---|---|---|---|---|---|---|
| Mateusz Krzemiński | 500 m | | | | | | |
| Mateusz Krzemiński | 1000 m | | | | | | |

Girls

| Athlete | Event | Quarterfinal | | Semifinal | | Final | |
| Athlete | Event | Time | Rank | Time | Rank | Time | Rank |
|---|---|---|---|---|---|---|---|
| Maria Dobosz | 500 m | | | | | | |
| Maria Dobosz | 1000 m | | | | | | |
| Hanna Sokołowska | 500 m | | | | | | |
| Hanna Sokołowska | 1000 m | | | | | | |

== Speed skating ==
Six Polish skaters achieved quota place for Poland based on the results of the 2019 World Junior Speed Skating Championships.

Boys

| Athlete | Event | Race 1 | | Race 2 | | Final | |
| Athlete | Event | Time | Rank | Time | Rank | Time | Rank |
|---|---|---|---|---|---|---|---|
| Filip Hawrylak | 500 m | | | | | 39.60 | 23 |
| Filip Hawrylak | 1500 m | — | | | | 2:00.02 | 13 |
| Filip Hawrylak | Mass start | — | | | | 5:55.89 | 11 |
| Michał Kopacz | 500 m | | | | | 38.58 | 16 |
| Michał Kopacz | 1500 m | — | | | | 2:04.99 | 26 |
| Michał Kopacz | Mass start | — | | | | 6:37.84 | 14 |

Girls

| Athlete | Event | Race 1 | | Race 2 | | Final | |
| Athlete | Event | Time | Rank | Time | Rank | Time | Rank |
|---|---|---|---|---|---|---|---|
| Marta Dobrowolska | 500 m | | | | | 44.03 | 23 |
| Marta Dobrowolska | 1500 m | — | | | | 2:22.34 | 24 |
| Marta Dobrowolska | Mass start | — | | | | 6:16.31 | 11 |
| Daria Kopacz | 500 m | | | | | 43.13 | 16 |
| Daria Kopacz | 1500 m | — | | | | 2:20.49 | 22 |
| Daria Kopacz | Mass start | — | | | | 7:10.43 | 14 |

Mixed team sprint

| Athletes | Event | Final | |
| Athletes | Event | Time | Rank |
|---|---|---|---|
| Team 4 Carla Álvarez (ESP); Yang binju (CHN); Nuraly Akzhol (KAZ); Filip Hawryłak (POL) | Mixed team sprint | 2:10.67 | 13 |
| Team 10; Marta Dobrowolska (POL); Yuka Takahashi (JPN); Park Sang-eon (KOR); Michał Kopacz (POL) | Mixed team sprint | DNF | |
| Team 16; Laura Kivioja (FIN); Daria Kopacz (POL); Theo Collins (GBR); Motonaga Arito (JPN) | Mixed team sprint | 2:05.92 | 2nd place, silver medalist(s) |

== See also ==
- Poland at the 2020 Summer Olympics
