= Belarus at the 2020 Winter Youth Olympics =

- IOC code: BLR
- NOC: Belarus Olympic Committee
- Website: www.noc.by/en

in Lausanne
- Competitors: 19 in 5 sports
- Medals: Gold 0 Silver 0 Bronze 1 Total 1

Winter Youth Olympics appearances (overview)
- 2012; 2016; 2020; 2024

Belarus competed at the 2020 Winter Youth Olympics in Lausanne, Switzerland from 9 to 22 January 2020.

== Medalists ==
Medal	Name	Sport	Event	Date
Gold	Ilya Korzun	Ice hockey	Boys' 3x3 mixed tournament	15 January
Bronze	Yuliya Kavaleuskaya	Biathlon	Girls' individual	11 January

== Alpine skiing ==
Boys

Athlete	Event	Run 1		Run 2		Total	
Athlete	Event	Time	Rank	Time	Rank	Time	Rank
Maksim Davydouski	Giant slalom	1:17.65	55	1:16.47	48	2:34.12	49
Maksim Davydouski	Slalom	DNF					

== Biathlon ==
Boys

Athlete	Event	Time	Misses	Rank
Kanstantsin Baburau	Sprint	22:21.3	3 (1+2)	45
Kanstantsin Baburau	Individual	39:09.4	5 (1+2+1+1)	40
Andrei Haurosh	Sprint	20:17.4	1 (0+1)	10
Andrei Haurosh	Individual	38:15.4	4 (1+1+0+2)	29
Artsiom Krylenka	Sprint	23:47.0	5 (2+3)	74
Artsiom Krylenka	Individual	40:09.2	5 (2+0+2+1)	52

Girls

Athlete	Event	Time	Misses	Rank
Darya Kabishava	Sprint	21:35.5	2 (2+0)	54
Darya Kabishava	Individual	38:53.3	5 (1+2+0+2)	45
Yuliya Kavaleuskaya	Sprint	19:57.9	3 (2+1)	17
Yuliya Kavaleuskaya	Individual	33:59.5	3 (0+2+1+0)	3rd place, bronze medalist(s)
Viktoryia Shashkova	Sprint	22:16.9	5 (3+2)	67
Viktoryia Shashkova	Individual	45:12.6	13 (5+4+2+2)	84

Mixed

Athletes	Event	Time	Misses	Rank
Yuliya Kavaleuskaya; Andrei Haurosh	Single mixed relay	44:33.9	2+14	12
Darya Kabishava; Viktoryia Shashkova; Kanstantsin Babarau; Andrei Haurosh	Mixed relay	1:19:25.3	4+15	17

== Cross-country skiing ==
Boys

Athlete	Event	Qualification		Quarterfinal		Semifinal		Final	
Athlete	Event	Time	Rank	Time	Rank	Time	Rank	Time	Rank
Mikhail Marozau	10 km classic	—N/a						31:13.1	54
Mikhail Marozau	Free sprint	3:51.55	68	Did not advance					
Mikhail Marozau	Cross-country cross	5:21.19	74	Did not advance					
Hleb Shakel	10 km classic	—N/a						32:00.1	60
Hleb Shakel	Free sprint	3:28.28	32	Did not advance					
Hleb Shakel	Cross-country cross	4:35.59	27 Q	—N/a		4:32.16	7	Did not advance	21

Girls

Athlete	Event	Qualification		Quarterfinal		Semifinal		Final	
Athlete	Event	Time	Rank	Time	Rank	Time	Rank	Time	Rank
Hanna Machakhina	5 km classic	—N/a						16:27.2	39
Hanna Machakhina	Free sprint	3:07.07	50	Did not advance					
Hanna Machakhina	Cross-country cross	5:32.88	40	Did not advance					
Darya Mayorava	5 km classic	—N/a						17:59.8	58
Darya Mayorava	Free sprint	3:14.30	59	Did not advance					
Darya Mayorava	Cross-country cross	6:32.09	71	Did not advance					

== Ice hockey ==
=== Mixed NOC 3x3 tournament ===
Boys

- Danil Karpovich
- Ilya Korzun
- Andrei Murashko
- Yan Shostak

== Speed skating ==
Boys

Athlete	Event	Time	Rank
Max Fiodarav	500 m	39.65	25
Max Fiodarav	1500 m	2:01.76	17
Andrei Herman	500 m	40.35	27
Andrei Herman	1500 m	2:00.50	15

Girls

Athlete	Event	Time	Rank
Varvara Bandaryna	500 m	44.06	26
Varvara Bandaryna	1500 m	2:24.61	28
Karyna Shypulia	500 m	43.70	20
Karyna Shypulia	1500 m	2:20.08	19

Mass Start

Athlete	Event	Semifinal			Final		
Athlete	Event	Points	Time	Rank	Points	Time	Rank
Max Fiodarav	Boys' mass start	1	6:25.95	8 Q	6	6:43.41	4
Andrei Herman	Boys' mass start	0	6:34.96	12	did not advance		
Varvara Bandaryna	Girls' mass start	3	7:03.60	8 Q	5	7:24.05	4
Karyna Shypulia	Girls' mass start	1	6:17.10	9	did not advance		

Mixed

Athlete	Event	Time	Rank
Team 1 Kateřina Macháčková (CZE); Isabel Grevelt (NED); Max Fiodarav (BLR); Felix Motschmann (GER)	Mixed team sprint	2:08.16	9
Team 2 Zuzana Kuršová (CZE); Wang Jingyi (CHN); Manuel Zähringer (GER); Andrei Herman (BLR)	Mixed team sprint	2:09.32	11
Team 7 Varvara Bandaryna (BLR); Myrthe de Boer (NED); Lukáš Šteklý (CZE); Yudai Yamamoto (JPN)	Mixed team sprint	2:06.80	5
Team 13; Karyna Shypulia (BLR); Alina Dauranova (KAZ); Xue Shiwen (CHN); Diego Amaya (COL)	Mixed team sprint	DQ	

== See also ==
- Belarus at the 2020 Summer Olympics
