= Singapore at the 2020 Winter Youth Olympics =

- IOC code: SGP
- NOC: Singapore National Olympic Council
- Website: www.singaporeolympics.com

in Lausanne
- Competitors: 3 in 2 sports
- Flag bearer: Alyssa Pok
- Medals: Gold 0 Silver 0 Bronze 0 Total 0

Winter Youth Olympics appearances
- 2020; 2024

Singapore competed at the 2020 Winter Youth Olympics in Lausanne, Switzerland from 9 to 22 January 2020.

Singapore made it Winter Youth Olympics debut.

== Ice hockey ==
=== Mixed NOC 3x3 tournament ===
Boys

- Matthew Hamnett

== Short track speed skating ==
Athlete	Event	Heats		Quarterfinal		Semifinal		Final	
Athlete	Event	Time	Rank	Time	Rank	Time	Rank	Time	Rank
Trevor Tan	Boys' 500 m	43.424	2	YC		did not advance			
Trevor Tan	Boys' 1000 m	1:38.032	3	did not advance					
Alyssa Pok	Girls' 500 m	48.044	4	did not advance					
Alyssa Pok	Girls' 1000 m	1:49.094	3	did not advance					

== See also ==
- Singapore at the 2020 Summer Olympics
