= Yukino Yoshida =

Japanese speed skater (born 2003)

Personal information
- Nationality: Japan
- Born: 29 January 2003 (age 23) Iwate Prefecture, Japan

Sport
- Country: Japan
- Sport: Speed skating
- Events: 500 m, 1000 m, 1500 m

Yukino Yoshida (吉田 雪乃, Yoshida Yukino) (born 29 January 2003) is a Japanese speed skater.

== Career ==
Yoshida won the 500 m bronze medal and the mixed team sprint gold medal at the 2020 Winter Youth Olympics.

Yoshida won the 500 m silver medal and the 1000 m gold medal at the 2022 World Junior Speed Skating Championships.

At the first event of 2024–25 World Cup, held at the M-Wave in Japan, Yoshida finished in first place at the 500 m in a personal record of 37.74, her first victory at the World Cup.

== Personal records ==
Personal records
Speed skating
Event	Result	Date	Location	Notes
500 m	36,88	15 November 2025	Salt Lake City	
1000 m	1.13,66	22 November 2025	Calgary	
1500 m	2.08,22	6 November 2020	Obihiro	
3000 m	4.43,97	2 October 2022	Hachinohe	
