= Spain at the 2020 Winter Youth Olympics =

- IOC code: ESP
- NOC: Spanish Olympic Committee
- Website: www.coe.es

in Lausanne
- Competitors: 24 in 7 sports
- Medals: Gold 1 Silver 1 Bronze 3 Total 5

Winter Youth Olympics appearances (overview)
- 2012; 2016; 2020; 2024

Spain competed at the 2020 Winter Youth Olympics in Lausanne, Switzerland from 9 to 22 January 2020.

== Medalists ==
Medal	Name	Sport	Event	Date
Gold	Maria Costa Diez	Ski mountaineering	Girls' sprint	13 January
Gold	Pablo González	Ice hockey	Boys' 3x3 mixed tournament	15 January
Gold	Eva Aizpurua	Ice hockey	Girls' 3x3 mixed tournament	15 January
Silver	Nil Llop	Speed skating	Boys' 500 metres	12 January
Bronze	Ot Ferrer	Ski mountaineering	Boys' sprint	13 January
Bronze	Maria Costa Diez; Marc Radua; Ares Torra; Ot Ferrer	Ski mountaineering	Mixed relay	14 January
Bronze	Álvaro Romero	Snowboarding	Boys' snowboard cross	20 January

== Alpine skiing ==
Boys

Athlete	Event	Run 1		Run 2		Total	
Athlete	Event	Time	Rank	Time	Rank	Time	Rank
Juan Sánchez	Super-G	—N/a				57.62	36
Juan Sánchez	Combined	57.62	36	DNF			
Juan Sánchez	Giant slalom	1:06.98	29	1:08.45	26	2:15.43	27
Juan Sánchez	Slalom	39.59	25	42.40	23	1:21.99	22

Girls

Athlete	Event	Run 1		Run 2		Total	
Athlete	Event	Time	Rank	Time	Rank	Time	Rank
Jana Suau	Super-G	—N/a				59.64	32
Jana Suau	Combined	59.64	32	DNF			
Jana Suau	Giant slalom	1:08.26	25	1:04.99	16	2:13.25	19
Jana Suau	Slalom	DNF					

== Curling ==
Spain qualified a mixed team of four athletes.

Mixed team

Team	Event	Group stage						Quarterfinal	Semifinal	Final / BM	
Team	Event	Opposition Score	Opposition Score	Opposition Score	Opposition Score	Opposition Score	Rank	Opposition Score	Opposition Score	Opposition Score	Rank
Aleix Raubert; Carmen Pérez; Oriol Gastó; Ana Vázquez	Mixed team	Poland; L 6 – 9	Estonia; W 9 – 3	Russia; L 4 – 11	Canada; L 3 – 9	South Korea; L 2 – 10	5	Did not advance			18

Mixed doubles

Athletes	Event	Round of 48	Round of 24	Round of 12	Round of 6	Semifinals	Final / BM	
Athletes	Event	Opposition Result	Opposition Result	Opposition Result	Opposition Result	Opposition Result	Opposition Result	Rank
	Mixed doubles							

== See also ==
- Spain at the 2020 Summer Olympics
