= Hungary at the 2020 Winter Youth Olympics =

- IOC code: HUN
- NOC: Hungarian Olympic Committee
- Website: www.olimpia.hu

in Lausanne
- Competitors: 23 in 10 sports
- Medals: Gold 0 Silver 0 Bronze 0 Total 0

Winter Youth Olympics appearances (overview)
- 2012; 2016; 2020; 2024

Hungary competed at the 2020 Winter Youth Olympics in Lausanne, Switzerland from 9 to 22 January 2020.

== Medalists ==
Medals awarded to participants of mixed-NOC teams are represented in italics. These medals are not counted towards the individual NOC medal tally.

Medal	Name	Sport	Event	Date
Gold	Levente Hegedűs	Ice hockey	Boys' 3x3 mixed tournament	15 January
Silver	Luca Márton	Ice hockey	Girls' 3x3 mixed tournament	15 January
Bronze	Regina Schermann	Figure skating	Team trophy	15 January
Bronze	Milán Ivády	Ice hockey	Boys' 3x3 mixed tournament	15 January
Bronze	Regina Metzler	Ice hockey	Girls' 3x3 mixed tournament	15 January

== Alpine skiing ==
Boys

Athlete	Event	Run 1		Run 2		Total	
Athlete	Event	Time	Rank	Time	Rank	Time	Rank
Tamás Trunk	Super-G	—N/a				1:02.10	54
Tamás Trunk	Combined	1:02.10	54	DNF			
Tamás Trunk	Giant slalom	1:10.98	40	1:12.20	42	2:23.18	38
Tamás Trunk	Slalom						

Girls

Athlete	Event	Run 1		Run 2		Total	
Athlete	Event	Time	Rank	Time	Rank	Time	Rank
Zita Tóth	Super-G	—N/a				57.47	16
Zita Tóth	Combined	57.47	16	40.47	22	1:37.94	17
Zita Tóth	Giant slalom	DNF					
Zita Tóth	Slalom						

== Curling ==
Hungary qualified a mixed team of four athletes.

Mixed team

Team	Event	Group stage						Quarterfinal	Semifinal	Final / BM	
Team	Event	Opposition Score	Opposition Score	Opposition Score	Opposition Score	Opposition Score	Rank	Opposition Score	Opposition Score	Opposition Score	Rank
Lőrinc Tatár; Linda Joó; Kristóf Szarvas; Laura Nagy	Mixed team	Denmark; W 6 – 2	Switzerland; L 2 – 8	China; L 2 – 3	Brazil; W 13 – 2	Germany; L 6 – 8	5	Did not advance			17

Mixed doubles

Athletes	Event	Round of 48	Round of 24	Round of 12	Round of 6	Semifinals	Final / BM	
Athletes	Event	Opposition Result	Opposition Result	Opposition Result	Opposition Result	Opposition Result	Opposition Result	Rank
	Mixed doubles							

== Figure skating ==
One Hungarian figure skater achieved quota place for Hungary based on the results of the 2019 World Junior Figure Skating Championships.

Athlete	Event	SP		FS		Total	
Athlete	Event	Points	Rank	Points	Rank	Points	Rank
Regina Schermann	Girls' singles						

== Short track speed skating ==
Two Hungarian skaters achieved quota places for Hungary based on the results of the 2019 World Junior Short Track Speed Skating Championships.

Boys

Athlete	Event	Quarterfinal		Semifinal		Final	
Athlete	Event	Time	Rank	Time	Rank	Time	Rank
Péter Jászapáti	500 m						
Péter Jászapáti	1000 m						

Girls

Athlete	Event	Quarterfinal		Semifinal		Final	
Athlete	Event	Time	Rank	Time	Rank	Time	Rank
Barbara Somogyi	500 m						
Barbara Somogyi	1000 m						

== Speed skating ==
Girls

Athlete	Event	Race 1		Race 2		Final	
Athlete	Event	Time	Rank	Time	Rank	Time	Rank
Hanna Bíró	500 m						
Hanna Bíró	1500 m	—N/a					
Hanna Bíró	Mass start	—N/a					

== See also ==
- Hungary at the 2020 Summer Olympics
- Hungary at the Youth Olympics
