= Slovakia at the 2020 Winter Youth Olympics =

- IOC code: SVK
- NOC: Slovak Olympic Committee
- Website: www.olympic.sk

in Lausanne
- Competitors: 49 in 10 sports
- Flag bearer: Matúš Černek
- Medals Ranked 25th: Gold 0 Silver 1 Bronze 1 Total 2

Winter Youth Olympics appearances (overview)
- 2012; 2016; 2020; 2024

Slovakia competed at the 2020 Winter Youth Olympics in Lausanne, Switzerland from 9 to 22 January 2020.

== Medalists ==
Medal	Name	Sport	Event	Date
Silver	Peter Repčík	Ice hockey	Boys' 3x3 mixed	15 January
Silver	Nikola Janeková	Ice hockey	Girls' 3x3 mixed	15 January
Silver	Viktória Čerňanská	Bobsleigh	Girls' monobob	19 January
Bronze	Rastislav Eliáš	Ice hockey	Boys' 3x3 mixed	15 January
Bronze	Zuzana Dobiašová	Ice hockey	Girls' 3x3 mixed	15 January
Bronze	Girls' tournament: Laura Medviďová; Simona Macková; Nikola Janeková; Zuzana Dobiášová; Emma Donovalová; Barbora Kapičáková; Tereza Belková; Emma Bianka Živčáková; Lea Giertlová; Mária Nemčeková; Laura Jancsóová; Hana Fančovičová; Lea Glosíková; Nina Hudáková; Kristína Slováková; Lily Stern; Viktória Kučerová	Ice hockey	Girls' tournament	21 January

== Alpine skiing ==
Boys

Athlete	Event	Run 1		Run 2		Total	
Athlete	Event	Time	Rank	Time	Rank	Time	Rank
Teo Žampa	Super-G	—N/a				55.92	21
Teo Žampa	Combined	55.92	21	38.02	33	1:33.94	24
Teo Žampa	Giant slalom	1:05.98	21	1:09.03	28	2:15.01	26
Teo Žampa	Slalom	41.64	34	1:05.05	39	1:46.69	37

Girls

Athlete	Event	Run 1		Run 2		Total	
Athlete	Event	Time	Rank	Time	Rank	Time	Rank
Rebeka Jančová	Super-G	—N/a				56.99	8
Rebeka Jančová	Combined	56.99	8	37.88	6	1:34.87	4
Rebeka Jančová	Giant slalom	1:07.15	18	1:04.67	13	2:11.82	14
Rebeka Jančová	Slalom	48.41	23	45.60	11	1:34.01	15

== Biathlon ==
Boys

Athlete	Event	Time	Misses	Rank
Matej Badáň	Individual	48:39.2	13 (2+3+4+4)	93
Matej Badáň	Sprint	24:07.2	3 (0+3)	78
Matej Gregor	Individual	41:04.6	7 (2+2+2+1)	61
Matej Gregor	Sprint	22:26.6	3 (0+3)	46
Bruno Matovič	Individual	43:04.1	7 (3+1+1+2)	80
Bruno Matovič	Sprint	24:43.1	4 (2+2)	83

Girls

Athlete	Event	Time	Misses	Rank
Ema Kapustová	Sprint	19:33.2	0 (0+0)	8
Ema Kapustová	Individual	36:44.7	5 (0+3+1+1)	21
Sára Pacerová	Sprint	DNS		
Sára Pacerová	Individual	42:25.3	11 (2+4+1+4)	72
Barbara Skačanová	Sprint	DNS		
Barbara Skačanová	Individual	38:02.4	5 (0+2+1+2)	36

Mixed

Athletes	Event	Time	Misses	Rank
Sára Pacerová; Matej Badáň	Single mixed relay	48:32.2	0+5 4+11	22
Sára Pacerová; Matej Badáň; Bruno Matovič; Ema Kapustová	Mixed relay	1:22:50.1	1+8 5+11	21

== Bobsleigh ==
Athlete	Event	Run 1		Run 2		Total	
Athlete	Event	Time	Rank	Time	Rank	Time	Rank
Martin Sviták	Boys' monobob	1:13.67	8	1:13.15	8	2:26.82	10
Viktória Čerňanská	Girls' monobob	1:13.83	3	1:13.52	2	2:27.35	2nd place, silver medalist(s)

== Cross-country skiing ==
Boys

Athlete	Event	Qualification		Quarterfinal		Semifinal		Final	
Athlete	Event	Time	Rank	Time	Rank	Time	Rank	Time	Rank
Denis Tilesch	10 km classical	—N/a						30:13.8	39
Denis Tilesch	Sprint	3:58.74	73	did not advance					
Denis Tilesch	Cross-country cross	4:54.25	55	—N/a		did not advance			
Matúš Oravec	10 km classical	—N/a						31:37.0	56
Matúš Oravec	Sprint	3:42.66	60	did not advance					
Matúš Oravec	Cross-country cross	4:56.04	58	—N/a		did not advance			

Girls

Athlete	Event	Qualification		Quarterfinal		Semifinal		Final	
Athlete	Event	Time	Rank	Time	Rank	Time	Rank	Time	Rank
Timea Mazúrová	5 km classical	—N/a						17:00.3	50
Timea Mazúrová	Sprint	3:06.33	47	did not advance					
Timea Mazúrová	Cross-country cross	5:48.90	52	—N/a		did not advance			
Kristína Sivoková	5 km classical	—N/a						15:45.7	23
Kristína Sivoková	Sprint	2:53.00	19 Q	2:57.26	6	did not advance			
Kristína Sivoková	Cross-country cross	5:25.71	26 Q	—N/a		5:25.35	10	did not advance	

== Freestyle skiing ==
Ski cross

Athlete	Event	Qualification		Group heats		Semifinal	Final
Athlete	Event	Points	Rank	Points	Rank	Points	Rank
Jakub Válek	Boys' ski cross	12	9	did not advance			
Kayla Anna Lozáková	Girls' ski cross	12	9	did not advance			

== Ice hockey ==
=== Girls' tournament ===
Roster

- Laura Medviďová
- Simona Macková
- Nikola Janeková
- Zuzana Dobiášová
- Emma Donovalová
- Barbora Kapičáková
- Tereza Belková
- Emma Bianka Živčáková
- Lea Giertlová
- Mária Nemčeková
- Laura Jancsóová
- Hana Fančovičová
- Lea Glosíková
- Nina Hudáková
- Kristína Slováková
- Lily Stern
- Viktória Kučerová

Team	Event	Group Stage			Semifinal	Final / BM	
Team	Event	Opposition Score	Opposition Score	Rank	Opposition Score	Opposition Score	Rank
Slovak girls'	Girls' tournament	Sweden; L 2-3GWS	Germany; W 2–1	2 Q	Japan; L 0–5	Switzerland; W 2–1	Bronze

Preliminary round

Pos	Team	Pld	W	SOW	SOL	L	GF	GA	GD	Pts	Qualification
1	Sweden	2	1	1	0	0	10	4	+6	5	Semifinals
2	Slovakia	2	1	0	1	0	4	4	0	4	Semifinals
3	Germany	2	0	0	0	2	3	9	−6	0	

Source: Lausanne2020

17 January 2020; 17:00	Sweden	3–2 GWS (1–2, 1–0, 0–0) (SO: 1–0)	Slovakia	Vaudoise aréna Attendance: 1,000

Game reference

Ebba Svensson Träff
Goalies
Laura Medviďová
Referees:
(Switzerland) Melissa Boverio
(Canada) Cianna Lieffers
Linesmen:
(Czech Republic) Kristýna Hájková
(United Kingdom) Philippa Wheeler

	0–1	01:04 – Kapičáková (Hudáková, Dobiášová)
	0–2	03:46 – Belková (Hudáková, Fančovičová) (PP)
Kenttälä (Klaar) – 14:28	1–2
Hjälm (Karlsson) (PP) – 20:33	2–2

Kenttälä (miss)
Karlsson (miss)
Hall
Hall
Shootout
Dobiášová
(miss) Janeková
(miss) Kapičáková
(miss) Dobiášová
9 min
Penalties
4.5 min
33
Shots
20

19 January 2020; 17:00	Slovakia	2–1 (0–0, 0–1, 2–0)	Germany	Vaudoise aréna Attendance: 1,100

Game reference

Laura Medviďová
Goalies
Chiara Schultes
Referees:
(Switzerland) Melissa Boverio
(Canada) Cianna Lieffers
Linesmen:
(Canada) Jessica Chartrand
(Czech Republic) Kristýna Hájková

	0–1	22:35 – Häckelsmiller (Heyer, Gottfried)
Donovalová (Stern) – 35:08	1–1
Kapičáková – 39:18	2–1

6 min
Penalties
6 min
21
Shots
14

=== Semifinals ===
20 January 2020; 17:00	Japan	5–0 (2–0, 1–0, 1–0)	Slovakia	Vaudoise aréna Attendance: 800

Game reference

Yuzuyu Fujii
Goalies
Laura Medviďová
Referees:
(Switzerland) Melissa Boverio
(United States) Melissa Doyle
Linesmen:
(Canada) Jessica Chartrand
(Sweden) Hanna Persson

Shimomukai (Ito) – 02:33	1–0
Noro (Murakami, Tsutsumi) – 03:26	2–0
Ito (Kamada, Sato) – 29:12	3–0
Shimomukai (Ito) – 38:28	4–0
Shimomukai (Kamada, Ito) – 40:06	5–0

4.5 min
Penalties
6 min
32
Shots
7

=== Bronze medal game ===
21 January 2020; 17:00	Slovakia	2-1	Switzerland	Vaudoise aréna

=== Boy's Teams ===
Team Red	Team Brown	Team Black	Team Grey
Goalkeeper: Matthias Bittner (GER); Goalkeeper: Maël Halladj (FRA); Jan Hornecker (SUI); Sander Salvær (NOR); Tjas Lesnicar (SLO); Dylan Wesseling (NED); Mackenzie Stewart (GBR); Peter Rpcik (SVK); Matija Dinić (SRB); Alex Menc (POL); Lin Wei-yu (TPE); Denis Pasko (UKR); Juho Lukkari (FIN)	Goalkeeper: Rastislav Elias (SVK); Goalkeeper: Sebastian Hagen Aarsund (NOR); Milan Ivady (HUN); Matyas Sapovaliv (CZE); Artur Seniut (LTU); Evan Thomas Nauth (GBR); Erik Potsinok (EST); Marlon Dacunto (GER); Axel Ruski-Jones (NZL); Chuo Xi Elvis Hsu (HKG); Hugo Galvez (FRA); Sai Lake (AUS); Luka Banek (CRO)	Goalkeeper: Kalle Varis (FIN); Goalkeeper: Matthias Rindone (ITA); Danil Karpovich (BLR); Linas Dedinas (LTU); Dominik Pavlata (CZE); Ivan Thomka (SVK); Wataru Suzuki (JPN); Corne van Stuijvenberg (NED); Yu Jiacong (CHN); Yaroslav Labutkin (RUS); Kerem Alsan (TUR); Lukas Floriantschitz (AUT); Ruben Esposito (ARG)	Goalkeeper: Lukas Svedin (SWE); Goalkeeper: Alexei Baidek (KAZ); Boldizsar Szalay (HUN); Nino Tomov (BUL); Jan Billa (AUT); Patrik Melicher (SVK); Sohn Hyun (KOR); Pablo Mata (ESP); Timofei Katkov (RUS); Gosei Daikuhara (JPN); Novruz Bayhanov (TKM); Alejandro Resendiz (MEX); Thawab Al-Subaey (QAT)

Preliminary round

All times are local (UTC+1).

Pos	Team	Pld	W	SOW	SOL	L	GF	GA	GD	Pts	Qualification
1	Team Green	7	5	1	0	1	64	43	+21	17	Semifinals
2	Team Brown	7	5	0	0	2	76	54	+22	15	Semifinals
3	Team Red	7	4	0	1	2	79	68	+11	13	Semifinals
4	Team Black	7	4	0	0	3	83	66	+17	12 (Note: Team Grey 8–16 Team Black)	Semifinals
5	Team Grey	7	4	0	0	3	58	73	−15	12	
6	Team Orange	7	3	0	0	4	56	51	+5	9	
7	Team Yellow	7	2	0	0	5	61	75	−14	6	
8	Team Blue	7	0	0	0	7	44	91	−47	0	

=== Semifinals ===
14 January 2020; 12:00	Team Green	7–3 (0–2, 2–0, 5–1)	Team Black	Vaudoise aréna

Game reference
			Referees: (Switzerland) Eric Cattaneo (Czech Republic) Jan Jaroš
44	Shots	42	Referees: (Switzerland) Eric Cattaneo (Czech Republic) Jan Jaroš

14 January 2020; 13:30	Team Brown	7–9 (4–4, 2–3, 1–2)	Team Red	Vaudoise aréna

Game reference
			Referees: (United States) Shane Gustafson (Russia) Igor Prusov
32	Shots	48	Referees: (United States) Shane Gustafson (Russia) Igor Prusov

=== Bronze medal game ===
15 January 2020; 12:00	(bronze) Team Brown	6–5 (1–2, 3–1, 2–2)	Team Black	Vaudoise aréna

Game reference
			Referees: (Switzerland) Eric Cattaneo (United States) Shane Gustafson
32	Shots	54	Referees: (Switzerland) Eric Cattaneo (United States) Shane Gustafson

=== Gold medal game ===
15 January 2020; 13:30	(gold) Team Green	10–4 (3–2, 4–1, 3–1)	Team Red (silver)	Vaudoise aréna

Game reference
			Referees: (Sweden) Filip Eriksson (Czech Republic) Jan Jaroš
55	Shots	31	Referees: (Sweden) Filip Eriksson (Czech Republic) Jan Jaroš

=== Girls' Teams ===
Team Blue	Team Red	Team Brown	Team Green	Team Black
Goalkeeper: Yuna Kusama (JPN); Goalkeeper: Aya Juhl Petersen (DEN); Nikki Sharp (AUS); Karolina Hengelmüller (AUT); Regina Metzler (HUN); Maya Stober (GER); Yana Krasheninina (RUS); Zuzana Dobiasová (SVK); Mirren Foy (GBR); Maria Runevska (BUL); Anna Kot (POL); Valerie Christmann (SUI); Sidre Özer (TUR)	Goalkeeper: Felicity Luby (GER); Goalkeeper: Anita Origlio (FRA); Andrea Trnková (CZE); Bea Storesund (NOR); Alina Ichayeva (RUS); Barbora Kapicaková (SVK); Mila Lutteral (ARG); Zoe Machler (SUI); Abby Rowbotham (GBR); Nie Xinrui (CHN); Kao Wei-ting (TPE); Valeria Ansoleaga (ESP); Sonia David (ROU)	Goalkeeper: Ivana Latková (SVK); Goalkeeper: Daniella Emilie Lauritzen Pizarro (NOR); Tallulah Bryant (NZL); Marja Linzbichler (AUT); Barbora Bartaková (CZE); Alicja Sowa (POL); Celine Mayer (GER); Roos Karst (NED); Riko Matsumoto (JPN); Ximena Gonzalez (MEX); Nausikaa Clement (FRA); Julia Termens (ESP); Arwen Nylaander (SLO)	Goalkeeper: Barbora Dalecká (CZE); Goalkeeper: Fruzsina Szabo (HUN); Kang Si-hyun (KOR); Lisa Schrofl (AUT); Jessie Taylor (GBR); Ruka Kiyokawa (JPN); Agata Muraro (ITA); Emma Donovalová (SVK); Chanel-Virginia Hofverberg (GER); Delfina Fattore (ARG); Huang Chun-lin (TPE); Annie Sommer (FRA); Melanie Hernandez (MEX)	Goalkeeper: Barbora Dalecká (CZE); Goalkeeper: Fruzsina Szabo (HUN); Kang Si-hyun (KOR); Lisa Schrofl (AUT); Jessie Taylor (GBR); Ruka Kiyokawa (JPN); Agata Muraro (ITA); Emma Donovalová (SVK); Chanel-Virginia Hofverberg (GER); Delfina Fattore (ARG); Huang Chun-lin (TPE); Annie Sommer (FRA); Melanie Hernandez (MEX)

Preliminary round

All times are local (UTC+1).

Pos	Team	Pld	W	SOW	SOL	L	GF	GA	GD	Pts	Qualification
1	Team Black	7	6	0	0	1	44	30	+14	18	Semifinals
2	Team Blue	7	4	1	1	1	43	35	+8	15	Semifinals
3	Team Yellow	7	4	0	0	3	52	42	+10	12	Semifinals
4	Team Brown	7	3	0	1	3	50	46	+4	10	Semifinals
5	Team Green	7	3	0	0	4	40	49	−9	9 (Note: Team Grey 4–9 Team Green)	
6	Team Grey	7	3	0	0	4	44	52	−8	9	
7	Team Red	7	2	1	0	4	44	44	0	8	
8	Team Orange	7	1	0	0	6	32	51	−19	3	

=== Semifinals ===
14 January 2020; 12:00	Team Black	11–7 (3–5, 6–1, 2–1)	Team Brown	Vaudoise aréna

Game reference
			Referees: (Canada) Cianna Lieffers (United Kingdom) Hollie Neenan
32	Shots	42	Referees: (Canada) Cianna Lieffers (United Kingdom) Hollie Neenan

14 January 2020; 13:30	Team Blue	5–7 (0–2, 2–3, 3–2)	Team Yellow	Vaudoise aréna

Game reference
			Referees: (United States) Melissa Doyle (Sweden) Hanna Persson
41	Shots	55	Referees: (United States) Melissa Doyle (Sweden) Hanna Persson

=== Bronze medal game ===
15 January 2020; 12:00	(bronze) Team Blue	6–4 (4–0, 2–1, 0–3)	Team Brown	Vaudoise aréna

Game reference
			Referees: (Canada) Jessica Chartrand (United Kingdom) Hollie Neenan
50	Shots	35	Referees: (Canada) Jessica Chartrand (United Kingdom) Hollie Neenan

=== Gold medal game ===
15 January 2020; 13:30	(silver) Team Black	1–6 (1–1, 0–4, 0–1)	Team Yellow (gold)	Vaudoise aréna

Game reference
(United States) Melissa Doyle / Goals / (Canada) Cianna Lieffers
36	Shots	36

== Luge ==
Individual sleds

Athlete	Event	Run 1		Run 2		Total	
Athlete	Event	Time	Rank	Time	Rank	Time	Rank
Vratislav Varga	Boys' singles	55.983	19	56.149	17	1:52.132	19
Dávid Lihoň	Boys' singles	55.462	16	56.446	21	1:51.908	16
Nikola Trembošová	Girls' singles	56.293	16	56.189	18	1:52.482	17
Bianka Petríková	Girls' singles	56.658	20	56.322	19	1:52.980	19
Vratislav Varga; Metod Majerčák	Boys' doubles	55.612	4	55.586	5	1:51.198	5
Nikola Trembošová; Bianka Petríková	Girls' doubles	57.742	10	57.026	5	1:54.768	7

Mixed team relay

Athlete	Event	Girls		Boys		Doubles		Total	
Athlete	Event	Time	Rank	Time	Rank	Time	Rank	Time	Rank
Nikola Trembošová; Vratislav Varga; Metod Majerčák; Dávid Lihoň	Team relay	DSQ							

== Short track speed skating ==
Girls

Athlete	Event	Heats		Quarterfinal		Semifinal		Final	
Athlete	Event	Time	Rank	Time	Rank	Time	Rank	Time	Rank
Petra Rusnáková	500 m	45.331	1 Q	44.500	2 Q	44.258	4 FB	45.857	6
Petra Rusnáková	1000 m	1:36.709	1 Q	1:38.442	1 Q	1:34.226	1 Q	1:30.221	5

== Ski mountaineering ==
Individual

Athlete	Event	Final	
Athlete	Event	Tme	Rank
Matúš Černek	Boys' individual	56:55.86	16
Laura Kovárová	Girls' individual	1:17:45.56	19

Sprint

Athlete	Event	Seeding		Quarterfinal		Semifinal		Final	
Athlete	Event	Time	Rank	Time	Rank	Time	Rank	Time	Rank
Matúš Černek	Boys' sprint	3:10.53	16	3:15.10	5	Did not advance			
Laura Kovárová	Girls' sprint	4:02.72	18	4:00.30	5	Did not advance			

Mixed team relay

Athlete	Event	Final	
Athlete	Event	Tme	Rank
Europe; Evgeniia Dolzhenkova (RUS); Matúš Černek (SVK); Laura Kovárová (SVK); Nikita Philippov (RUS)	Mixed relay	40:56	9

== Snowboarding ==
Snowboard cross

Athlete	Event	Qualification		Group heats		Semifinal	Final
Athlete	Event	Points	Rank	Points	Rank	Position	Position
Katarína Pitoňáková	Girls' snowboard cross	10	10	did not advance			

Slopestyle

Athlete	Event	Qualification				Final			
Athlete	Event	Run 1	Run 2	Best	Rank	Run 1	Run 2	Best	Rank
Eva Hanicová	Girls' slopestyle	16.00	29.00	29.00	13	did not advance			

Big air

Athlete	Event	Qualification				Final			
Athlete	Event	Run 1	Run 2	Best	Rank	Run 1	Run 2	Best	Rank
Eva Hanicová	Girls' big air	12.66	DNS	12.66	20	did not advance			
