= Croatia at the 2020 Winter Youth Olympics =

- IOC code: CRO
- NOC: Croatian Olympic Committee
- Website: www.hoo.hr

in Lausanne
- Competitors: 10 in 6 sports
- Medals: Gold 0 Silver 0 Bronze 0 Total 0

Winter Youth Olympics appearances (overview)
- 2012; 2016; 2020; 2024

Croatia competed at the 2020 Winter Youth Olympics in Lausanne, Switzerland from 9 to 22 January 2020.

== Medalists ==
Medals awarded to participants of mixed-NOC teams are represented in italics. These medals are not counted towards the individual NOC medal tally.

| Medal | Name | Sport | Event | Date |
|---|---|---|---|---|
| Bronze | Luka Banek | Ice hockey | Boys' 3x3 mixed tournament | 15 January |

== Alpine skiing ==
Boys

| Athlete | Event | Run 1 | | Run 2 | | Total | |
| Athlete | Event | Time | Rank | Time | Rank | Time | Rank |
|---|---|---|---|---|---|---|---|
| Tvrtko Ljutić | Super-G | — | | | | 58.45 | 41 |
| Tvrtko Ljutić | Combined | 58.45 | 41 | 34.72 | 12 | 1:33.17 | 20 |
| Tvrtko Ljutić | Giant slalom | 1:07.06 | 30 | 1:06.21 | 20 | 2:13.27 | 25 |
| Tvrtko Ljutić | Slalom | 37.46 | 6 | 40.45 | 7 | 1:17.91 | 5 |

== Biathlon ==
Boys

| Athlete | Event | Time | Misses | Rank |
|---|---|---|---|---|
| Sven Kuprešak | Sprint | 23:57.5 | 4 (2+2) | 76 |
| Sven Kuprešak | Individual | 43:01.3 | 6 (1+0+3+2) | 78 |

Girls

| Athlete | Event | Time | Misses | Rank |
|---|---|---|---|---|
| Doris Baričavac | Sprint | 26:50.2 | 10 (5+5) | 90 |
| Doris Baričavac | Individual | 47:34.2 | 14 (3+3+4+4) | 89 |
| Nika Jagečić | Sprint | 23:50.0 | 7 (2+5) | 82 |
| Nika Jagečić | Individual | 45:16.8 | 13 (1+5+4+3) | 85 |

Mixed

| Athletes | Event | Time | Misses | Rank |
|---|---|---|---|---|
| Doris Baričavac; Sven Kuprešak | Single mixed relay | 52:15.4 | 8+15 | 27 |

== Bobsleigh ==
| Athlete | Event | Run 1 | | Run 2 | | Total | |
| Athlete | Event | Time | Rank | Time | Rank | Time | Rank |
|---|---|---|---|---|---|---|---|
| Toni Nimac | Boys' | 1:15.27 | 16 | 1:15.12 | 14 | 2:30.39 | 15 |

== Cross-country skiing ==
Boys

| Athlete | Event | Qualification | | Quarterfinal | | Semifinal | | Final | |
| Athlete | Event | Time | Rank | Time | Rank | Time | Rank | Time | Rank |
|---|---|---|---|---|---|---|---|---|---|
| Petar Perušić | 10 km classic | — | | | | | | 34:16.1 | 71 |
| Petar Perušić | Freestyle sprint | 3:46.38 | 62 | Did not advance | | | | | |
| Petar Perušić | Cross-country cross | 5:03.05 | 63 | Did not advance | | | | | |

Girls

| Athlete | Event | Qualification | | Quarterfinal | | Semifinal | | Final | |
| Athlete | Event | Time | Rank | Time | Rank | Time | Rank | Time | Rank |
|---|---|---|---|---|---|---|---|---|---|
| Tena Hadžić | 5 km classic | — | | | | | | 18:12.4 | 63 |
| Tena Hadžić | Freestyle sprint | 3:10.33 | 53 | Did not advance | | | | | |
| Tena Hadžić | Cross-country cross | 5:59.02 | 58 | Did not advance | | | | | |
| Nika Jagečić | 5 km classic | — | | | | | | 17:12.3 | 52 |
| Nika Jagečić | Freestyle sprint | 3:02.68 | 41 | Did not advance | | | | | |
| Nika Jagečić | Cross-country cross | 5:38.53 | 44 | Did not advance | | | | | |

== Ice hockey ==
=== Mixed NOC 3x3 tournament ===
| Team | Event | Group stage | | | | | | | | Semifinal | Final / BM | |
| Team | Event | Opposition Score | Opposition Score | Opposition Score | Opposition Score | Opposition Score | Opposition Score | Opposition Score | Rank | Opposition Score | Opposition Score | Rank |
|---|---|---|---|---|---|---|---|---|---|---|---|---|
| Team Brown; Luka Banek (CRO); Sai Lake (AUS); Hugo Galvez (FRA); Elvis Hsu (HKG); Axel Ruski-Jones (NZL); Marlon D'Acunto (GER); Erik Potšinok (EST); Evan Nauth (GBR); Artur Seniut (LTU); Matyáš Šapovaliv (CZE); Milán Ivády (HUN); Rastislav Eliáš (SVK); Sebastian Aarsund (NOR) | Boys' 3x3 | Team Black; W 13–11 (6–5, 3–2, 4–4) | Team Green; L 6–8 (1–2 3–2 2–4) | Team Grey; W 16–6 (4–3, 4–2, 8–1) | Team Orange; W 14–10 (6–0, 5–4, 3–6) | Team Red; L 5–11 (2–3, 1–4, 2–4) | Team Blue; W 14–2 (5–0, 3–1, 6–1) | Team Yellow; W 8–6 (2–1, 2–0, 4–5) | 2 | Team Red; L 7–9 (4–4, 2–3, 1–2) | Team Black; W 6–5 (1–2, 3–1, 2–2) | 3rd place, bronze medalist(s) |

== Short track speed skating ==
Boys

| Athlete | Event | Quarterfinal | | Semifinal | | Final | |
| Athlete | Event | Time | Rank | Time | Rank | Time | Rank |
|---|---|---|---|---|---|---|---|
| Stribor Suman | 500 m | DNF | | Did not advance | | | |
| Stribor Suman | 1000 m | 1:36.199 | 3 | Did not advance | | | |

Girls

| Athlete | Event | Quarterfinal | | Semifinal | | Final | |
| Athlete | Event | Time | Rank | Time | Rank | Time | Rank |
|---|---|---|---|---|---|---|---|
| Maja Ivandić | 500 m | 48.166 | 3 | Did not advance | | | |
| Maja Ivandić | 1000 m | 1:49.948 | 4 | Did not advance | | | |

== See also ==
- Croatia at the 2020 Summer Olympics
