= Greece at the 2020 Winter Youth Olympics =

- IOC code: GRE
- NOC: Hellenic Olympic Committee
- Website: www.hoc.gr

in Lausanne
- Competitors: 12 in 5 sports
- Medals: Gold 0 Silver 0 Bronze 0 Total 0

Winter Youth Olympics appearances
- 2012; 2016; 2020; 2024

Greece competed at the 2020 Winter Youth Olympics in Lausanne, Switzerland from 9 to 22 January 2020.

== Alpine skiing ==
Boys

Athlete	Event	Run 1		Run 2		Total	
Athlete	Event	Time	Rank	Time	Rank	Time	Rank
Christos Marmarellis	Super-G	—N/a				1:01.73	52
Christos Marmarellis	Combined	1:01.73	52	DNF			
Christos Marmarellis	Giant slalom	1:11.10	41	1:10.90	35	2:22.00	35
Christos Marmarellis	Slalom	43.55	42	45.32	30	1:28.87	33

Girls

Athlete	Event	Run 1		Run 2		Total	
Athlete	Event	Time	Rank	Time	Rank	Time	Rank
Maria Nikoleta Kaltsogianni	Super-G	—N/a				1:12.35	50
Maria Nikoleta Kaltsogianni	Combined	1:12.35	50	DNF			
Maria Nikoleta Kaltsogianni	Giant slalom	1:21.55	48	1:17.85	33	2:39.40	33
Maria Nikoleta Kaltsogianni	Slalom	54.97	37	54.55	31	1:49.52	30

== Biathlon ==
Boys

Athlete	Event	Time	Misses	Rank
Angelos Antoniadis	Sprint	24:40.0	6 (4+2)	82
Angelos Antoniadis	Individual	47:36.3	11 (2+3+2+4)	92

Girls

Athlete	Event	Time	Misses	Rank
Konstantina Charalampidou	Sprint	26:07.4	3 (1+2)	89
Konstantina Charalampidou	Individual	47:51.3	8 (2+3+1+2)	90
Ioanna Kotsalou	Sprint	23:39.7	2 (0+2)	79
Ioanna Kotsalou	Individual	45:07.5	10 (3+4+0+3)	83
Nefeli Tita	Sprint	25:29.2	6 (4+2)	87
Nefeli Tita	Individual	43:55.8	9 (2+1+3+3)	80

Mixed

Athletes	Event	Time	Misses	Rank
Nefeli Tita; Angelos Antoniadis	Single mixed relay	DNF		

== Cross-country skiing ==
Boys

Athlete	Event	Qualification		Quarterfinal		Semifinal		Final	
Athlete	Event	Time	Rank	Time	Rank	Time	Rank	Time	Rank
Georgios Anastasiadis	10 km classic	—N/a						DNS	
Georgios Anastasiadis	Free sprint	3:52.72	70	Did not advance					
Georgios Anastasiadis	Cross-country cross	5:12.73	70	Did not advance					
Spyridonas Papadopoulos	10 km classic	—N/a						DNS	
Spyridonas Papadopoulos	Free sprint	5:06.00	86	Did not advance					
Spyridonas Papadopoulos	Cross-country cross	5:47.50	79	Did not advance					

Girls

Athlete	Event	Qualification		Quarterfinal		Semifinal		Final	
Athlete	Event	Time	Rank	Time	Rank	Time	Rank	Time	Rank
Styliani Giannakoviti	5 km classic	—N/a						DNS	
Styliani Giannakoviti	Free sprint	3:22.11	62	Did not advance					
Styliani Giannakoviti	Cross-country cross	6:15.42	64	Did not advance					
Eleni Ioannou	5 km classic	—N/a						DNS	
Eleni Ioannou	Free sprint	3:32.31	71	Did not advance					
Eleni Ioannou	Cross-country cross	6:29.62	70	Did not advance					

== Freestyle skiing ==
Ski cross

Athlete	Event	Group heats		Semifinal	Final
Athlete	Event	Points	Rank	Position	Position
Georgios Almpanidis	Boys' ski cross	7	26	Did not advance	

== Snowboarding ==
Snowboard cross

Athlete	Event	Group heats		Semifinal	Final
Athlete	Event	Points	Rank	Position	Position
Dimitrios Graikos	Boys' snowboard cross	7	27	Did not advance	

== See also ==
- Greece at the 2020 Summer Olympics
