= Biathlon at the 2020 Winter Youth Olympics – Girls' individual =

Girls' individual at the III Winter Youth Olympic Games
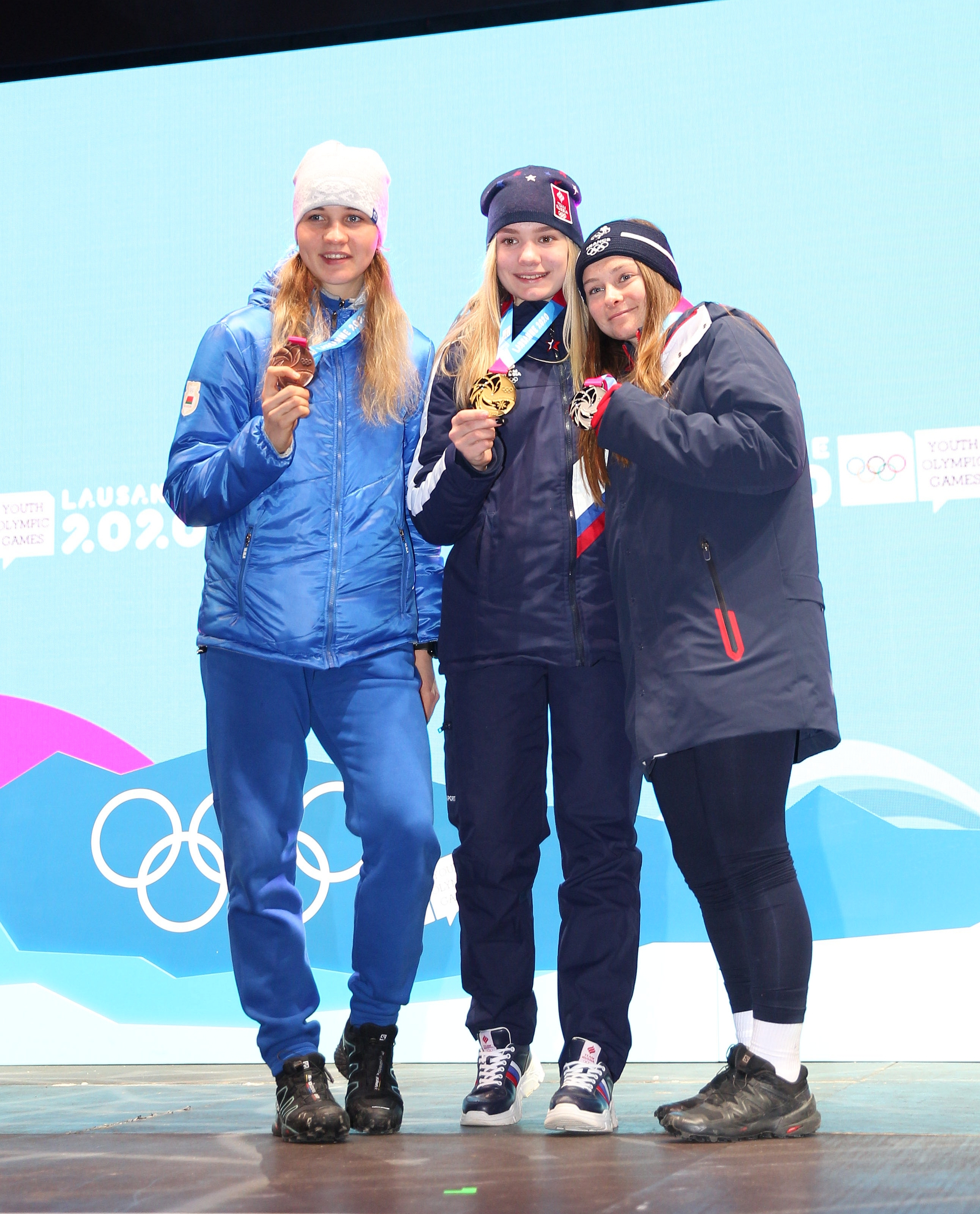
- Venue: Les Tuffes Nordic Centre
- Date: 11 January 2020
- Competitors: 97 from 36 nations
- Winning time: 32:26.7

Medalists
1st place, gold medalist(s)		Alena Mokhova	Russia
2nd place, silver medalist(s)		Jeanne Richard	France
3rd place, bronze medalist(s)		Yuliya Kavaleuskaya	Belarus

The girls' 10 km individual biathlon competition at the 2020 Winter Youth Olympics was held on 11 January 2020 at the Les Tuffes Nordic Centre.

== Results ==
The race was started at 10:30.

Rank	Bib	Name	Country	Time	Penalties (P+S)	Deficit
1st place, gold medalist(s)	17	Alena Mokhova	Russia	32:26.7	2 (1+0+0+1)	
2nd place, silver medalist(s)	53	Jeanne Richard	France	33:30.5	2 (0+0+1+1)	+1:03.8
3rd place, bronze medalist(s)	16	Yuliya Kavaleuskaya	Belarus	33:59.5	3 (0+2+1+0)	+1:32.8
4	37	Martina Trabucchi	Italy	34:11.1	2 (0+2+0+0)	+1:44.4
5	30	Johanna Puff	Germany	34:14.7	2 (1+0+0+1)	+1:48.0
6	94	Léonie Jeannier	France	34:46.4	4 (1+1+1+1)	+2:19.7
7	84	Gunn Kristi Stensaker Tvinnereim	Norway	34:53.6	3 (0+1+1+1)	+2:26.9
8	88	Femke Kramer	Austria	35:11.3	4 (1+1+0+2)	+2:44.6
9	8	Gro Njølstad Randby	Norway	35:22.1	5 (1+1+1+2)	+2:55.4
10	13	Linda Zingerle	Italy	35:25.7	6 (1+1+2+2)	+2:59.0
11	4	Fany Bertrand	France	35:27.8	5 (3+0+1+1)	+3:01.1
12	61	Gabriela Masaříková	Czech Republic	35:29.5	4 (1+1+0+2)	+3:02.8
13	89	Martina Giordano	Italy	35:31.8	2 (0+1+0+1)	+3:05.1
14	21	Lara Wagner	Austria	35:44.3	5 (1+3+1+0)	+3:17.6
15	29	Demi Heinsoo	Estonia	35:46.7	4 (1+1+0+2)	+3:20.0
16	77	Arina Soldatova	Russia	35:55.7	3 (1+1+1+0)	+3:29.0
17	63	Valentina Dimitrova	Bulgaria	36:20.0	5 (2+3+0+0)	+3:53.3
18	85	Kaisa Bosek	United States	36:30.8	2 (0+0+2+0)	+4:04.1
19	70	Anna Andexer	Austria	36:34.2	6 (2+3+0+1)	+4:07.5
19	92	Zuzana Doležalová	Czech Republic	36:34.2	5 (3+0+0+2)	+4:07.5
21	6	Ema Kapustová	Slovakia	36:44.7	5 (0+3+1+1)	+4:18.0
22	43	Synne Herheim	Norway	36:50.9	8 (1+2+3+2)	+4:24.2
23	14	Chiara Arnet	Switzerland	37:01.1	5 (1+0+1+3)	+4:34.4
24	90	Lara Berwert	Switzerland	37:07.4	5 (3+0+1+1)	+4:40.7
25	67	Marlene Fichtner	Germany	37:08.4	4 (0+3+1+0)	+4:41.7
26	48	Klaudia Topór	Poland	37:22.6	5 (0+1+1+3)	+4:55.9
27	78	Hanna Skrypko	Ukraine	37:25.3	4 (2+0+1+1)	+4:58.6
28	96	Hannah Schlickum	Germany	37:26.8	4 (0+2+1+1)	+5:00.1
29	22	Sara Andersson	Sweden	37:31.1	6 (0+2+1+3)	+5:04.4
30	23	Ding Yuhuan	China	37:43.8	6 (1+2+2+1)	+5:17.1
31	51	Kristina Pavlushina	Russia	37:43.9	6 (1+3+0+2)	+5:17.2
32	46	Pascale Paradis	Canada	37:49.3	7 (2+2+2+1)	+5:22.6
33	81	Chloé Bened	France	37:51.6	8 (2+3+0+3)	+5:24.9
34	75	Justyna Panterałka	Poland	37:54.1	5 (0+1+1+3)	+5:27.4
35	86	Sara Scattolo	Italy	37:54.2	6 (1+2+1+2)	+5:27.5
36	74	Barbora Skačanová	Slovakia	38:02.4	5 (0+2+1+2)	+5:35.7
37	64	Jenna Sherrington	Canada	38:09.0	6 (1+2+1+2)	+5:42.3
38	97	Anastasiia Zenova	Russia	38:13.0	8 (4+1+1+2)	+5:46.3
39	3	Shawna Pendry	Great Britain	38:13.7	6 (0+2+1+3)	+5:47.0
40	5	Kateřina Pavlů	Czech Republic	38:22.3	6 (1+3+1+1)	+5:55.6
41	45	Kaja Zorc	Slovenia	38:27.3	8 (1+3+2+2)	+6:00.6
42	11	Anna Nędza-Kubiniec	Poland	38:30.8	8 (2+3+1+2)	+6:04.1
43	50	Wilma Björn	Sweden	38:36.0	6 (2+1+1+2)	+6:09.3
44	58	Tetiana Prodan	Ukraine	38:36.5	6 (0+2+2+2)	+6:09.8
45	69	Darya Kabishava	Belarus	38:53.3	5 (1+2+0+2)	+6:26.6
46	83	Marlene Perren	Switzerland	38:57.8	7 (0+2+1+4)	+6:31.1
47	26	Luka Miskin	Australia	39:06.5	5 (0+2+0+3)	+6:39.8
48	38	Choi Yoo-nah	South Korea	39:07.2	4 (1+2+0+1)	+6:40.5
49	60	Nathalie Horstmann	Germany	39:09.6	7 (1+3+0+3)	+6:42.9
50	40	Victoria Mellitzer	Austria	39:13.0	8 (3+2+2+1)	+6:46.3
51	24	Daria Skriabina	Ukraine	39:14.8	6 (0+3+0+3)	+6:48.1
52	9	Lena Repinc	Slovenia	39:25.7	10 (1+3+3+3)	+6:59.0
53	93	Viktoriia Zhukovska	Ukraine	39:37.5	4 (1+1+1+1)	+7:10.8
54	95	Herborg Idland	Norway	39:55.6	7 (0+2+1+4)	+7:28.9
55	49	Margaret Madigan	United States	39:59.8	8 (3+2+1+2)	+7:33.1
56	42	Līva Šahno	Latvia	40:06.1	5 (1+1+0+3)	+7:39.4
57	12	Lora Hristova	Bulgaria	40:23.7	9 (3+2+3+1)	+7:57.0
58	79	Svatava Mikysková	Czech Republic	40:25.1	9 (3+3+2+1)	+7:58.4
59	68	Miia Utsal	Estonia	40:28.3	5 (1+2+0+2)	+8:01.6
60	71	Chelsey Johnson	Australia	40:33.6	2 (0+2+0+0)	+8:06.9
61	20	Mine Kılıç	Turkey	40:39.4	7 (2+2+1+2)	+8:12.7
62	41	Lisbeth Liiv	Estonia	40:44.3	11 (3+1+4+3)	+8:17.6
63	72	Klara Andersson	Sweden	40:44.6	6 (1+2+2+1)	+8:17.9
64	33	Naomi Walch	Canada	40:49.4	8 (4+0+4+0)	+8:22.7
65	19	Ulyana Ardalionova	Kazakhstan	40:55.6	8 (3+2+0+3)	+8:28.9
66	28	Misa Sasaki	Japan	40:58.3	7 (2+3+1+1)	+8:31.6
67	66	Arina Kupriyanova	Kazakhstan	41:04.2	10 (3+3+3+1)	+8:37.5
68	65	Kaja Marič	Slovenia	41:35.4	13 (3+3+3+4)	+9:08.7
69	35	Maja Lapkass	United States	41:38.3	10 (1+4+2+3)	+9:11.6
70	82	Lora Radkovska	Bulgaria	41:54.7	6 (2+0+1+3)	+9:28.0
71	39	Yara Burkhalter	Switzerland	41:56.1	9 (2+2+2+3)	+9:29.4
72	36	Sára Pacerová	Slovakia	42:25.3	11 (2+4+1+4)	+9:58.6
73	52	Vlada Vassillchenko	Kazakhstan	42:29.2	12 (3+3+3+3)	+10:02.5
74	2	Andrea Csutak	Romania	42:34.3	8 (2+4+0+2)	+10:07.6
75	25	Anniina Rantala	Finland	43:03.3	12 (4+3+2+3)	+10:36.6
76	47	Kamilė Jakubauskaitė	Lithuania	43:30.2	5 (1+2+0+2)	+11:03.5
76	44	Isabella Moon	Australia	43:30.2	10 (3+5+0+2)	+11:03.5
78	54	Kurea Matsuoka	Japan	43:44.6	7 (3+1+2+1)	+11:17.9
79	18	Viktorija Augulytė	Lithuania	43:46.9	7 (3+2+1+1)	+11:20.2
80	59	Nefeli Tita	Greece	43:55.8	9 (2+1+3+3)	+11:29.1
81	10	Signe Miķelsone	Latvia	44:11.7	10 (2+3+4+1)	+11:45.0
82	73	Anastasija Nedaivodina	Latvia	44:38.6	7 (2+1+2+2)	+12:11.9
83	32	Ioanna Kotsalou	Greece	45:07.5	10 (3+4+0+3)	+12:40.8
84	56	Viktoryia Shashkova	Belarus	45:12.6	13 (5+4+2+2)	+12:45.9
85	57	Nika Jagečić	Croatia	45:16.8	13 (1+5+4+3)	+12:50.1
86	62	Blanka Borbély	Romania	45:26.9	9 (1+4+0+4)	+13:00.2
87	31	Chuluunbatyn Byambasüren	Mongolia	46:48.2	11 (3+2+4+2)	+14:21.5
88	80	Zsulett Demian	Romania	47:13.5	10 (2+1+4+3)	+14:46.8
89	15	Doris Barićevac	Croatia	47:34.2	14 (3+3+4+4)	+15:07.5
90	87	Konstantina Charalampidou	Greece	47:51.3	8 (2+3+1+2)	+15:24.6
91	34	Ana Marija Zafirovska	North Macedonia	51:11.9	10 (5+2+3+0)	+18:45.2
92	7	Taynara da Silva	Brazil	53:23.9	13 (2+2+4+5)	+20:57.2
93	27	Antonia Cebotari	Moldova	54:33.6	13 (1+4+4+4)	+22:06.9
	91	Luka Mackevičiūtė	Lithuania	Disqualified		
	1	Elena Bondarets	Kyrgyzstan	Disqualified		
	55	Anni Hyvärinen	Finland	Disqualified		
	76	Olivia Halme	Finland	Did not finish		
