= Freestyle skiing at the 2020 Winter Youth Olympics – Boys' ski cross =

Boys' ski cross at the III Winter Youth Olympic Games
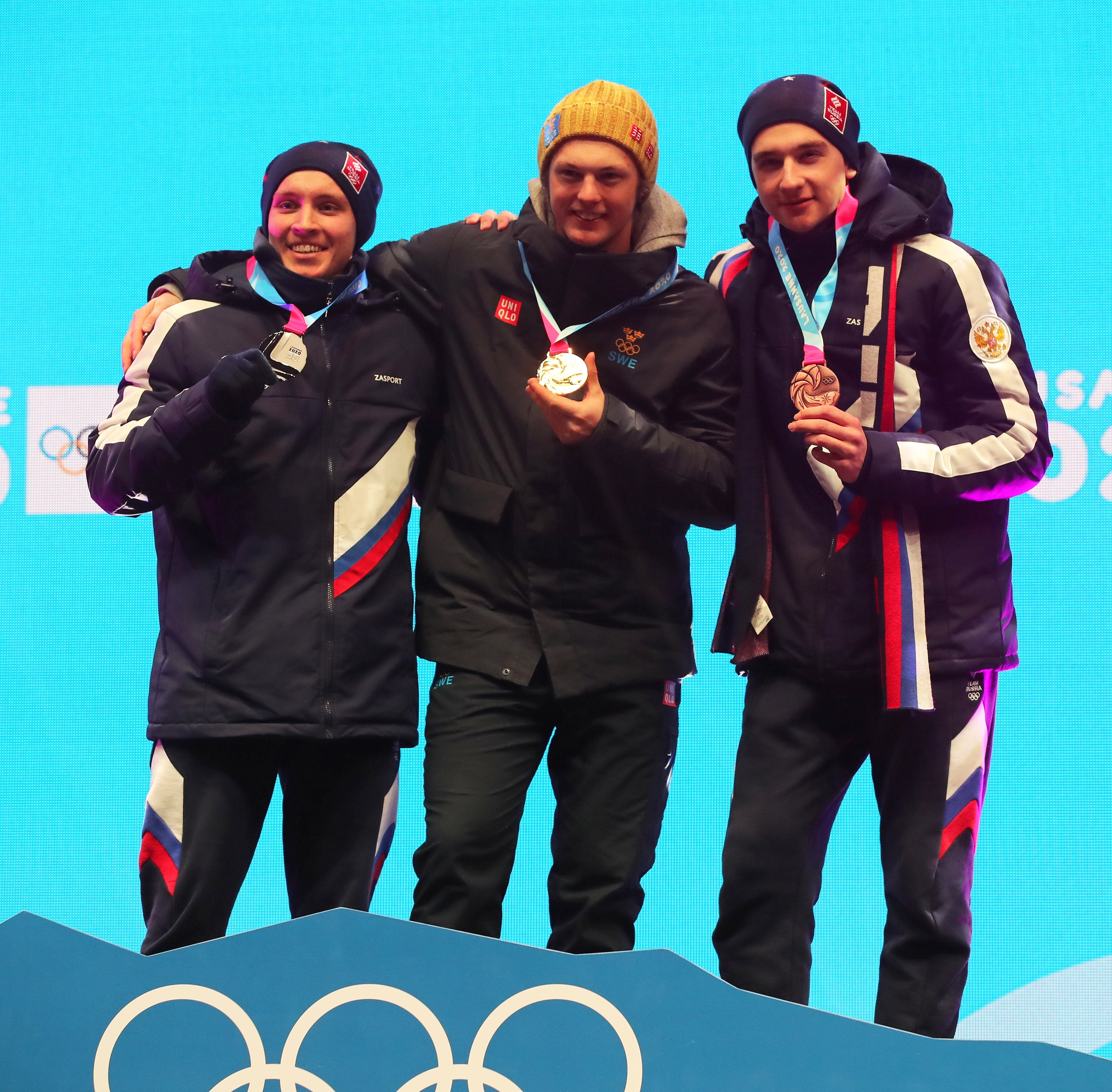
- Venue: Villars Winter Park
- Dates: 19 January
- Competitors: 26 from 17 nations

Medalists
1st place, gold medalist(s)		Erik Wahlberg	Sweden
2nd place, silver medalist(s)		Artem Bazhin	Russia
3rd place, bronze medalist(s)		Andrei Gorbachev	Russia

The boys' ski cross event in freestyle skiing at the 2020 Winter Youth Olympics took place on 19 January at the Villars Winter Park.

== Results ==
=== Group heats ===
Panel 1

Rank	Bib	Athlete	Group 1				Group 2				Group 3				Group 4				Group 5				Total
Rank	Bib	Athlete	1	2	3	4	5	6	7	8	9	10	11	12	13	14	15	16	17	18	19	20	Total
1	16	Marcus Plank (AUT)		4						4			4			4			4				20
2	17	Artem Bazhin (RUS)			4		4						3					3		4			18
3	1	Erik Wahlberg (SWE)	4				3				4				4				3				18
4	21	Robin Tissières (SUI)			3				4		3					3						4	17
5	20	Christoph Danksagmüller (AUT)			2			4						4			4		2				16
6	4	Scott Johns (GBR)	3					3				4				2				3			15
7	5	Jack Morrow (CAN)	2						3				2				3				4		14
8	8	Jasper Cobcroft (AUS)	1							2				3				4				3	13
9	12	Charlie Lang (CAN)		3				2			2							2			3		12
9	24	Jakub Válek (SVK)			1					3		3			3						DNF		12
11	9	Qiu Xiyang (CHN)		2			2					2					2					2	10
12	13	Hou Haoyi (CHN)		1					2					2	2					2			9
13	25	Samuele Cheller (ITA)				DNS	DNS							DNS		DNS					DNS		0

Panel 2

Rank	Bib	Athlete	Group 1				Group 2				Group 3				Group 4				Group 5				Total
Rank	Bib	Athlete	1	2	3	4	5	6	7	8	9	10	11	12	13	14	15	16	17	18	19	20	Total
1	2	Sebastian Veit (GER)	4				4				4				4				4				20
2	3	Fredrik Nilsson (SWE)	3					4				4				4				4			19
3	10	Andrei Gorbachev (RUS)		4			3					3					4					4	18
4	19	Thomas Kolly (SUI)			4			3						4			3		3				17
5	11	Kilian Himmelsbach (GER)		3				2			3							4			4		16
6	22	Tom Barnoin (FRA)			3				4		2					3						3	15
7	7	Ben Wynn (AUS)	1							4				3				3				2	13
7	27	Richard Zachoval (CZE)				4		1					4		3							1	13
9	6	Josef Petřek (CZE)	2						3				2				2				3		12
9	15	Eli Derrick (USA)		2						3			3			2			2				12
11	26	Jannes Debertol (ITA)				3	2							2		1					2		10
12	14	Oscar Trygg (NOR)		1					2					1	2					3			9
13	23	Isbat Hoque (HUN)			2					2		2			1						1		8
14	18	Georgios Almpanidis (GRE)			1		1						1					2		2			7

=== Semifinals ===
Semifinal 1

Rank	Bib	Name	Deficit	Notes
1	10	Andrei Gorbachev (RUS)		BF
2	16	Marcus Plank (AUT)	+0.53	BF
3	3	Fredrik Nilsson (SWE)	+19.77	SF
4	21	Robin Tissières (SUI)	+39.75	SF

Semifinal 2

Rank	Bib	Name	Deficit	Notes
1	1	Erik Wahlberg (SWE)		BF
2	17	Artem Bazhin (RUS)	+0.30	BF
3	19	Thomas Kolly (SUI)	+0.36	SF
4	2	Sebastian Veit (GER)	DNF	SF

=== Finals ===
Small final

Rank	Bib	Name	Deficit
5	2	Sebastian Veit (GER)	
6	3	Fredrik Nilsson (SWE)	+0.15
7	21	Robin Tissières (SUI)	+0.66
8	19	Thomas Kolly (SUI)	DNF

Big final

Rank	Bib	Name	Deficit
1st place, gold medalist(s)	1	Erik Wahlberg (SWE)	
2nd place, silver medalist(s)	17	Artem Bazhin (RUS)	+0.21
3rd place, bronze medalist(s)	10	Andrei Gorbachev (RUS)	+1.69
4	16	Marcus Plank (AUT)	+2.48
