= Gro Randby =

Norwegian biathlete (born 2002)

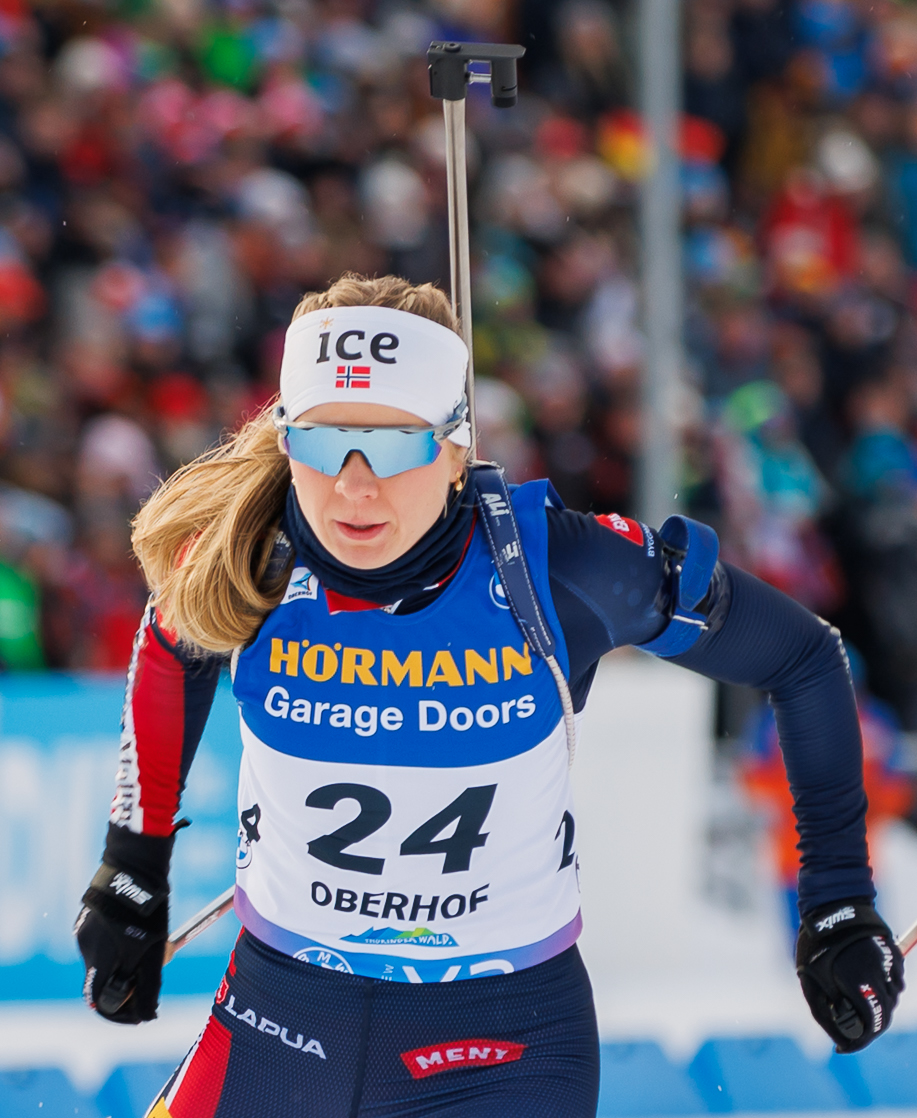
- Randby in 2025

Personal information
- Nationality: Norwegian
- Born: 17 April 2002 (age 24) Tønsberg, Norway

Sport
- Country: Norway
- Sport: Biathlon
Medal record
Women's biathlon
Representing Norway
Junior World Championships
| Gold medal – first place | 2024 Otepää | 4 × 6 km mixed relay |
| Silver medal – second place | 2024 Otepää | 4 × 6 km relay |

Gro Njølstad Randby (born 17 April 2002) is a Norwegian biathlete. She made her debut in the Biathlon World Cup in 2024.

== Career ==
Gro Randby competed in her first international events at the 2020 Winter Youth Olympics in Lausanne, where she finished 9th and 26th in the individual and sprint events, respectively, and secured 5th place in the mixed relay. In the following years, she was not selected for international competitions and instead competed exclusively in the Norwegian Cup. However, ahead of the 2022/23 winter season, she was included in the Utviklingslandslag, a development team equivalent to the B-team.

Subsequently, the Norwegian athlete made her IBU Cup debut in Idre at the end of 2022, finishing in the Top 30 three times despite consistently struggling with shooting misses. She showed significant improvement during the 2023/24 season, achieving her first podium finish in the sprint event in Sjusjøen, where she placed third behind Océane Michelon and Jeanne Richard. In February 2024, Randby participated in the Junior World Championships for the first time, winning gold in the mixed relay with Sivert Gerhardsen, Isak Frey, and Maren Brännare-Gran, as well as silver in the women's relay. Her second IBU Cup podium came during the season finale in Obertilliach, where she finished second in the sprint, narrowly beaten by Stefanie Scherer.

In cross-country skiing, Randby competed almost exclusively in junior-level races from 2019 onward. She gained significant attention at the 2024 Norwegian Championships, where she finished second in the 5-kilometer classic race, just 2.7 seconds behind Heidi Weng, leaving nearly the entire national cross-country team behind her.

After the preseason races in Sjusjøen in November 2024, she was selected for the main roster of the Norwegian national team to compete in the first stage of the 2024/25 World Cup.

== Personal life ==
Randby's sister, Nora, is also active as a biathlete.

== Biathlon results ==
All results are sourced from the International Biathlon Union.

=== World Cup ===
| Season | Age | Overall | | | Individual | | Sprint | | Pursuit | | Mass start | |
| Season | Age | Races | Points | Position | Points | Position | Points | Position | Points | Position | Points | Position |
|---|---|---|---|---|---|---|---|---|---|---|---|---|
| 2024–25 | 22 | 8/21 | 76 | 56th | — | — | 42 | 47th | 16 | 55th | 18 | 51st |

=== Youth and Junior World Championships ===
1 medal (1 silver)

| Year | Age | Individual | Sprint | Mass Start | Relay | Mixed Relay |
|---|---|---|---|---|---|---|
| (Estonia) 2024 Otepää | 21 | 7th | 10th | 16th | Silver | Gold |
