= Biathlon at the 2020 Winter Youth Olympics – Girls' sprint =

Girls' sprint at the III Winter Youth Olympic Games
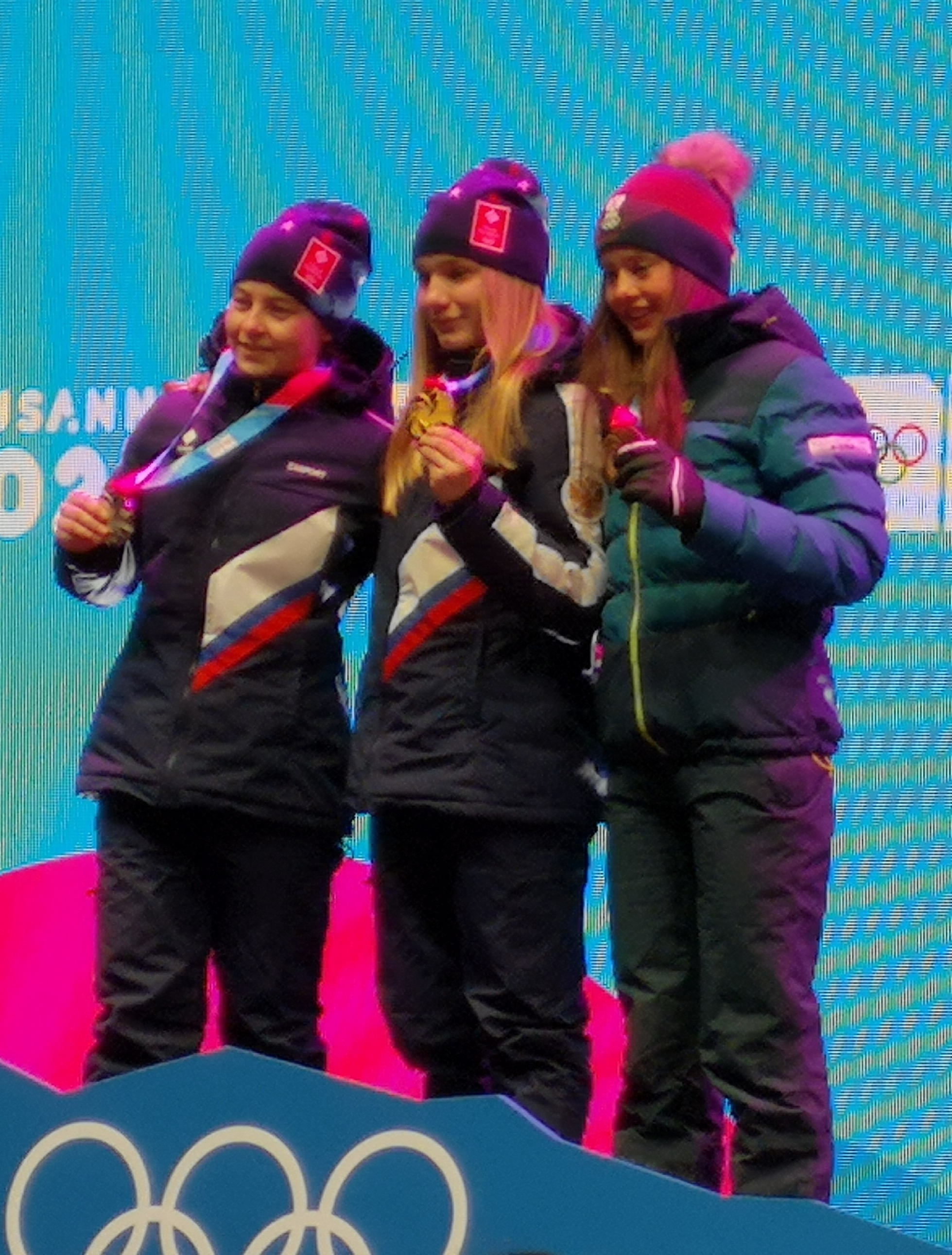
- Venue: Les Tuffes Nordic Centre
- Date: 14 January
- Competitors: 97 from 36 nations
- Winning time: 18:55.5

Medalists
1st place, gold medalist(s)		Alena Mokhova	Russia
2nd place, silver medalist(s)		Anastasiia Zenova	Russia
3rd place, bronze medalist(s)		Anna Andexer	Austria

The girls' 6 km sprint biathlon competition at the 2020 Winter Youth Olympics was held on 14 January at the Les Tuffes Nordic Centre.

== Results ==
The race was started at 13:30.

Rank	Bib	Name	Country	Time	Penalties (P+S)	Deficit
1st place, gold medalist(s)	15	Alena Mokhova	Russia	18:55.5	1 (0+1)	
2nd place, silver medalist(s)	95	Anastasiia Zenova	Russia	18:57.4	1 (0+1)	+1.9
3rd place, bronze medalist(s)	64	Anna Andexer	Austria	19:01.6	1 (0+1)	+6.1
4	3	Johanna Puff	Germany	19:08.3	1 (1+0)	+12.8
5	79	Kaja Marič	Slovenia	19:09.0	2 (1+1)	+13.5
6	30	Kaja Zorc	Slovenia	19:22.9	1 (1+0)	+27.4
7	91	Léonie Jeannier	France	19:26.2	1 (0+1)	+30.7
8	21	Ema Kapustová	Slovakia	19:33.2	0 (0+0)	+37.7
9	29	Yara Burkhalter	Switzerland	19:34.2	0 (0+0)	+38.7
10	6	Klaudia Topór	Poland	19:42.6	1 (0+1)	+47.1
11	32	Valentina Dimitrova	Bulgaria	19:47.2	1 (1+0)	+51.7
12	26	Shawna Pendry	Great Britain	19:47.3	1 (0+1)	+51.8
13	63	Marlene Perren	Switzerland	19:50.5	1 (0+1)	+55.0
14	35	Jenna Sherrington	Canada	19:50.6	1 (1+0)	+55.1
15	12	Linda Zingerle	Italy	19:53.0	3 (1+2)	+57.5
16	58	Marlene Fichtner	Germany	19:56.5	1 (0+1)	+1:01.0
17	44	Fany Bertrand	France	19:57.9	3 (1+2)	+1:02.4
17	23	Yuliya Kavaleuskaya	Belarus	19:57.9	3 (2+1)	+1:02.4
19	14	Gunn Kristi Stensaker Tvinnereim	Norway	19:58.8	2 (1+1)	+1:03.3
20	24	Lara Wagner	Austria	20:03.3	3 (1+2)	+1:07.8
21	46	Arina Soldatova	Russia	20:07.7	1 (0+1)	+1:12.2
22	50	Lena Repinc	Slovenia	20:07.8	3 (1+2)	+1:12.3
23	37	Ulyana Ardalionova	Kazakhstan	20:09.1	1 (1+0)	+1:13.6
24	67	Chloé Bened	France	20:13.4	3 (1+2)	+1:17.9
25	43	Chiara Arnet	Switzerland	20:14.6	1 (0+1)	+1:19.1
26	61	Gro Njølstad Randby	Norway	20:14.8	4 (1+3)	+1:19.3
27	10	Sara Andersson	Sweden	20:23.1	2 (2+0)	+1:27.6
28	49	Tetiana Prodan	Ukraine	20:24.6	2 (0+2)	+1:29.1
29	90	Femke Kramer	Austria	20:28.5	3 (1+2)	+1:33.0
30	51	Pascale Paradis	Canada	20:28.6	4 (1+3)	+1:33.1
31	96	Herborg Idland	Norway	20:39.5	2 (1+1)	+1:44.0
32	8	Hanna Skrypko	Ukraine	20:41.2	1 (1+0)	+1:45.7
33	75	Synne Herheim	Norway	20:42.4	5 (4+1)	+1:46.9
34	33	Ding Yuhuan	China	20:43.8	4 (3+1)	+1:48.3
35	9	Jeanne Richard	France	20:44.1	4 (1+3)	+1:48.6
36	56	Martina Trabucchi	Italy	20:44.1	3 (2+1)	+1:48.6
37	5	Zuzana Doležalová	Czech Republic	20:44.7	3 (0+3)	+1:49.2
37	85	Kristina Pavlushina	Russia	20:44.7	4 (1+3)	+1:49.2
39	94	Martina Giordano	Italy	20:44.8	1 (0+1)	+1:49.3
40	89	Lara Berwert	Switzerland	20:45.0	2 (0+2)	+1:49.5
41	57	Gabriela Masaříková	Czech Republic	20:45.9	4 (2+2)	+1:50.4
42	73	Sara Scattolo	Italy	20:48.5	3 (1+2)	+1:53.0
43	74	Olivia Halme	Finland	20:54.2	2 (1+1)	+1:58.7
44	47	Lora Hristova	Bulgaria	20:57.7	2 (1+1)	+2:02.2
45	87	Kateřina Pavlů	Czech Republic	21:01.4	2 (0+2)	+2:05.9
46	92	Svatava Mikysková	Czech Republic	21:03.0	2 (0+2)	+2:07.5
47	55	Lisbeth Liiv	Estonia	21:04.9	4 (2+2)	+2:09.4
48	60	Anni Hyvärinen	Finland	21:10.8	2 (0+2)	+2:15.3
49	86	Hannah Schlickum	Germany	21:16.4	2 (0+2)	+2:20.9
50	59	Luka Miskin	Australia	21:17.3	1 (0+1)	+2:21.8
51	53	Victoria Mellitzer	Austria	21:26.1	4 (3+1)	+2:30.6
52	66	Naomi Walch	Canada	21:34.2	3 (1+2)	+2:38.7
53	88	Viktoriia Zhukovska	Ukraine	21:34.7	1 (1+0)	+2:39.2
54	36	Darya Kabishava	Belarus	21:35.5	2 (2+0)	+2:40.0
55	77	Kaisa Bosek	United States	21:38.0	2 (1+1)	+2:42.5
56	34	Demi Heinsoo	Estonia	21:38.1	4 (1+3)	+2:42.6
57	70	Daria Skriabina	Ukraine	21:41.2	3 (0+3)	+2:45.7
58	72	Justyna Panterałka	Poland	21:45.4	3 (1+2)	+2:49.9
59	41	Wilma Björn	Sweden	21:45.5	2 (1+1)	+2:50.0
60	22	Anniina Rantala	Finland	21:46.2	3 (2+1)	+2:50.7
61	52	Anna Nędza-Kubiniec	Poland	21:46.6	6 (3+3)	+2:51.1
62	84	Vlada Vassillchenko	Kazakhstan	21:47.0	4 (2+2)	+2:51.5
63	16	Arina Kupriyanova	Kazakhstan	21:49.4	5 (2+3)	+2:53.9
64	25	Choi Yoo-nah	South Korea	21:53.8	2 (1+1)	+2:58.3
65	48	Margaret Madigan	United States	22:07.4	2 (1+1)	+3:11.9
66	97	Nathalie Horstmann	Germany	22:13.7	5 (3+2)	+3:18.2
67	80	Viktoryia Shashkova	Belarus	22:16.9	5 (3+2)	+3:21.4
68	17	Mine Kılıç	Turkey	22:17.0	3 (0+3)	+3:21.5
69	40	Signe Miķelsone	Latvia	22:21.3	2 (1+1)	+3:25.8
70	19	Maja Lapkass	United States	22:25.8	4 (2+2)	+3:30.3
71	82	Klara Andersson	Sweden	22:37.0	3 (1+2)	+3:41.5
72	4	Līva Šahno	Latvia	22:58.0	4 (1+3)	+4:02.5
73	78	Miia Utsal	Estonia	23:03.4	3 (1+2)	+4:07.9
74	76	Chelsey Johnson	Australia	23:09.5	0 (0+0)	+4:14.0
75	45	Kurea Matsuoka	Japan	23:18.7	2 (1+1)	+4:23.2
76	68	Viktorija Augulytė	Lithuania	23:27.4	1 (0+1)	+4:31.9
77	28	Isabella Moon	Australia	23:28.5	6 (4+2)	+4:33.0
78	2	Misa Sasaki	Japan	23:32.6	5 (3+2)	+4:37.1
79	27	Ioanna Kotsalou	Greece	23:39.7	2 (0+2)	+4:44.2
80	81	Lora Radkovska	Bulgaria	23:40.2	3 (2+1)	+4:44.7
81	11	Andrea Csutak	Romania	23:45.2	3 (2+1)	+4:49.7
82	38	Nika Jagečić	Croatia	23:50.0	7 (2+5)	+4:54.5
83	31	Chuluunbatyn Byambasüren	Mongolia	24:01.9	4 (3+1)	+5:06.4
84	39	Blanka Borbély	Romania	24:09.1	3 (0+3)	+5:13.6
85	69	Anastasija Nedaivodina	Latvia	25:12.0	2 (1+1)	+6:16.5
86	71	Zsulett Demian	Romania	25:18.8	4 (2+2)	+6:23.3
87	62	Nefeli Tita	Greece	25:29.2	6 (4+2)	+6:33.7
88	13	Elena Bondarets	Kyrgyzstan	26:00.4	6 (4+2)	+7:04.9
89	83	Konstantina Charalampidou	Greece	26:07.4	3 (1+2)	+7:11.9
90	7	Doris Barićevac	Croatia	26:50.2	10 (5+5)	+7:54.7
91	42	Kamilė Jakubauskaitė	Lithuania	27:14.4	5 (4+1)	+8:18.9
92	18	Ana Marija Zafirovska	North Macedonia	28:23.8	5 (2+3)	+9:28.3
93	1	Antonia Cebotari	Moldova	28:28.2	6 (1+5)	+9:32.7
94	20	Taynara da Silva	Brazil	28:55.6	6 (2+4)	+10:00.1
	54	Barbora Skačanová	Slovakia	Did not start		
	65	Sára Pacerová	Slovakia	Did not start		
	93	Luka Mackevičiūtė	Lithuania	Did not start		
