= Biathlon at the 2020 Winter Youth Olympics – Boys' sprint =

Boys' sprint at the III Winter Youth Olympic Games
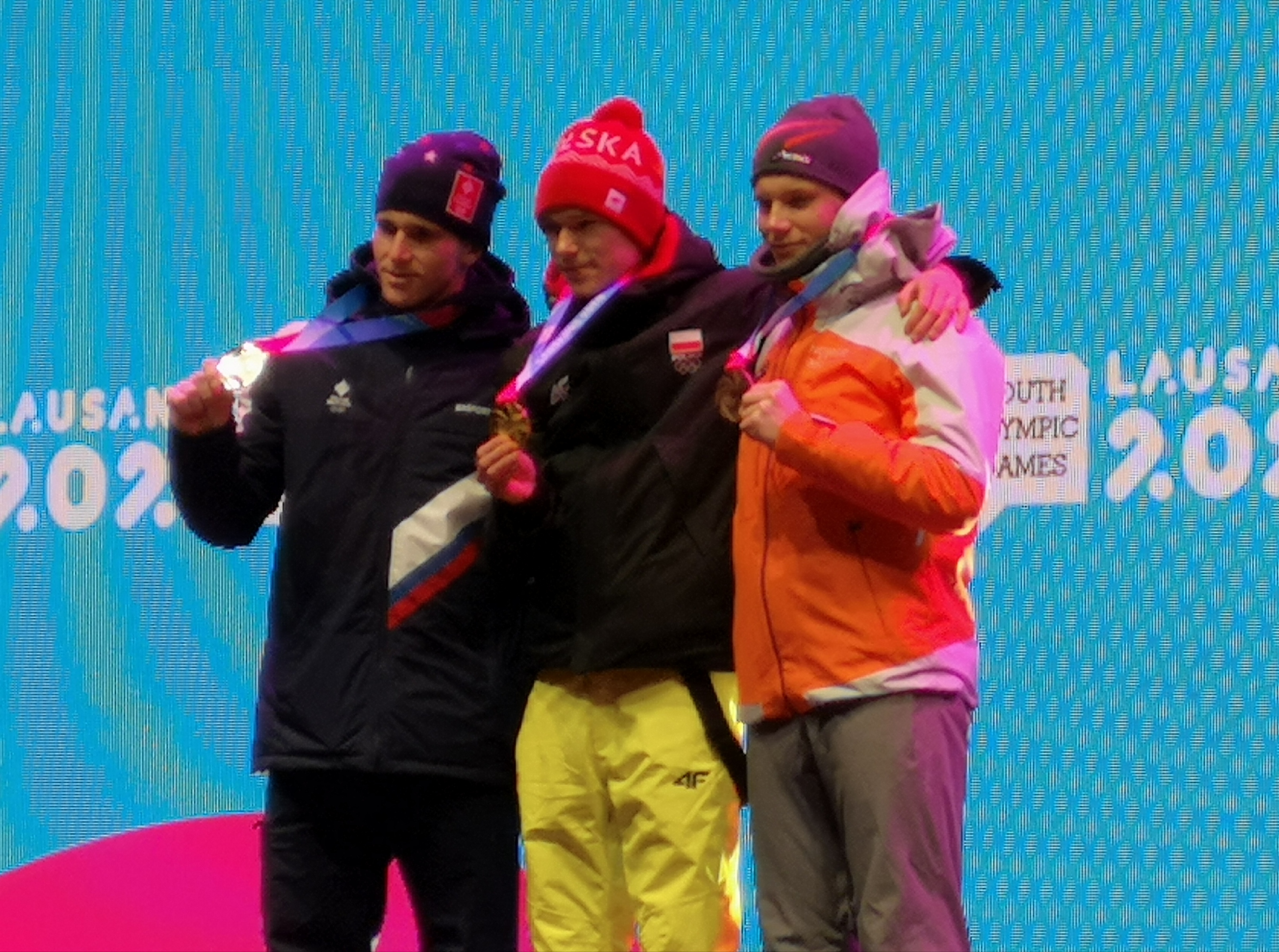
- Venue: Les Tuffes Nordic Centre
- Date: 14 January
- Competitors: 99 from 36 nations
- Winning time: 19:23.8

Medalists
| 1st place, gold medalist(s) | | Marcin Zawół | Poland |
| 2nd place, silver medalist(s) | | Denis Irodov | Russia |
| 3rd place, bronze medalist(s) | | Vegard Thon | Norway |

The boys' 7.5 km sprint biathlon competition at the 2020 Winter Youth Olympics was held on 14 January at the Les Tuffes Nordic Centre.

== Results ==
The race was started at 10:30.

| Rank | Bib | Name | Country | Time | Penalties (P+S) | Deficit |
|---|---|---|---|---|---|---|
| 1st place, gold medalist(s) | 52 | Marcin Zawół | Poland | 19:23.8 | 1 (0+1) | |
| 2nd place, silver medalist(s) | 91 | Denis Irodov | Russia | 19:36.4 | 1 (0+1) | +12.6 |
| 3rd place, bronze medalist(s) | 68 | Vegard Thon | Norway | 19:42.3 | 1 (0+1) | +18.5 |
| 4 | 30 | Campbell Wright | New Zealand | 19:45.1 | 1 (1+0) | +21.3 |
| 5 | 83 | Vitalii Mandzyn | Ukraine | 19:59.8 | 1 (1+0) | +36.0 |
| 6 | 5 | Marco Barale | Italy | 20:00.6 | 3 (1+2) | +36.8 |
| 7 | 54 | Oscar Andersson | Sweden | 20:01.3 | 2 (2+0) | +37.5 |
| 8 | 6 | Stepan Kinash | Ukraine | 20:08.0 | 1 (0+1) | +44.2 |
| 9 | 51 | Luděk Abrahám | Czech Republic | 20:13.3 | 4 (2+2) | +49.5 |
| 10 | 34 | Andrei Haurosh | Belarus | 20:17.4 | 1 (0+1) | +53.6 |
| 11 | 98 | Théo Guiraud-Poillot | France | 20:18.3 | 2 (1+1) | +54.5 |
| 12 | 10 | Mathieu Garcia | France | 20:19.4 | 2 (0+2) | +55.6 |
| 13 | 13 | Jan Guńka | Poland | 20:21.4 | 4 (1+3) | +57.6 |
| 14 | 56 | Isak Frey | Norway | 20:27.0 | 4 (1+3) | +1:03.2 |
| 15 | 81 | Konrad Badacz | Poland | 20:27.2 | 3 (1+2) | +1:03.4 |
| 16 | 99 | Stian Fedreheim | Norway | 20:38.0 | 3 (1+2) | +1:14.2 |
| 17 | 27 | Vasil Zashev | Bulgaria | 20:39.3 | 2 (1+1) | +1:15.5 |
| 18 | 89 | Vadim Kurales | Kazakhstan | 20:48.8 | 4 (3+1) | +1:25.0 |
| 19 | 9 | Emil Hage Streitlien | Norway | 20:51.7 | 3 (1+2) | +1:27.9 |
| 20 | 63 | Lukas Weissbacher | Austria | 20:51.8 | 3 (2+1) | +1:28.0 |
| 21 | 94 | Franz Schaser | Germany | 20:57.2 | 2 (1+1) | +1:33.4 |
| 22 | 49 | Mark Kozak | Ukraine | 21:11.3 | 3 (0+3) | +1:47.5 |
| 23 | 80 | Leon Kienesberger | Austria | 21:13.1 | 1 (1+0) | +1:49.3 |
| 24 | 58 | Florian Stasswender | Germany | 21:22.2 | 3 (0+3) | +1:58.4 |
| 25 | 23 | Elias Asal | Germany | 21:23.8 | 4 (3+1) | +2:00.0 |
| 26 | 22 | Jakub Kudrnáč | Czech Republic | 21:24.5 | 3 (2+1) | +2:00.7 |
| 27 | 61 | Lou Thievent | France | 21:28.5 | 4 (4+0) | +2:04.7 |
| 28 | 96 | Felix Ullmann | Switzerland | 21:29.8 | 1 (0+1) | +2:06.0 |
| 29 | 73 | Fabian Hermansson | Sweden | 21:32.8 | 2 (2+0) | +2:09.0 |
| 30 | 36 | Oleg Domichek | Russia | 21:40.4 | 5 (3+2) | +2:16.6 |
| 31 | 62 | Jaša Zidar | Slovenia | 21:42.1 | 3 (3+0) | +2:18.3 |
| 32 | 38 | Yanis Keller | Switzerland | 21:42.5 | 4 (2+2) | +2:18.7 |
| 33 | 28 | Danil Chervenko | Kazakhstan | 21:42.6 | 4 (0+4) | +2:18.8 |
| 34 | 79 | Etienne Bordes | United States | 21:45.2 | 2 (1+1) | +2:21.4 |
| 35 | 82 | Petr Hak | Czech Republic | 21:53.0 | 3 (0+3) | +2:29.2 |
| 36 | 95 | Jan Salzmann | Austria | 21:59.7 | 5 (2+3) | +2:35.9 |
| 37 | 17 | Drejc Trojer | Slovenia | 22:00.0 | 4 (2+2) | +2:36.2 |
| 37 | 53 | Nicolò Betemps | Italy | 22:00.0 | 5 (2+3) | +2:36.2 |
| 39 | 65 | Roman Morenkov | Russia | 22:01.3 | 6 (4+2) | +2:37.5 |
| 40 | 1 | Ethan Algra | Canada | 22:06.2 | 2 (2+0) | +2:42.4 |
| 41 | 32 | Tuudor Palm | Estonia | 22:08.8 | 5 (3+2) | +2:45.0 |
| 42 | 77 | Noé In Albon | Switzerland | 22:13.0 | 4 (2+2) | +2:49.2 |
| 43 | 2 | Pavel Lyashok | Russia | 22:18.7 | 5 (1+4) | +2:54.9 |
| 44 | 64 | Mark Vozelj | Slovenia | 22:20.7 | 5 (3+2) | +2:56.9 |
| 45 | 37 | Kanstantsin Baburau | Belarus | 22:21.3 | 3 (1+2) | +2:57.5 |
| 46 | 44 | Matěj Gregor | Slovakia | 22:26.6 | 3 (0+3) | +3:02.8 |
| 47 | 8 | Victor Berglund | Sweden | 22:27.1 | 6 (2+4) | +3:03.3 |
| 47 | 85 | Aubin Gautier-Pélissier | France | 22:27.1 | 6 (5+1) | +3:03.3 |
| 49 | 19 | Enkhbatyn Enkhsaikhan | Mongolia | 22:27.3 | 5 (3+2) | +3:03.5 |
| 50 | 29 | Lukas Haslinger | Austria | 22:33.0 | 5 (2+3) | +3:09.2 |
| 51 | 88 | Kalle Loukkaanhuhta | Finland | 22:37.6 | 4 (1+3) | +3:13.8 |
| 52 | 18 | Chiharu Ueda | Japan | 22:38.0 | 5 (1+4) | +3:14.2 |
| 53 | 86 | Aleksandrs Kuzņecovs | Latvia | 22:44.7 | 3 (1+2) | +3:20.9 |
| 54 | 74 | Zalán Kovács | Romania | 22:47.0 | 3 (0+3) | +3:23.2 |
| 55 | 97 | Jan Semirád | Czech Republic | 22:50.6 | 4 (3+1) | +3:26.8 |
| 56 | 59 | Andreas Koppa | Estonia | 22:51.1 | 5 (1+4) | +3:27.3 |
| 57 | 47 | Shi Yuanyuan | China | 22:52.5 | 4 (0+4) | +3:28.7 |
| 58 | 93 | Philipp Tumler | Italy | 22:58.5 | 6 (3+3) | +3:34.7 |
| 59 | 66 | Gou Zhendong | China | 23:00.8 | 6 (1+5) | +3:37.0 |
| 60 | 20 | Liu Zhaoyu | China | 23:03.9 | 3 (1+2) | +3:40.1 |
| 61 | 92 | Serhii Kryshtal | Ukraine | 23:07.3 | 4 (1+3) | +3:43.5 |
| 62 | 31 | Ville-Valtteri Karvinen | Finland | 23:13.4 | 6 (2+4) | +3:49.6 |
| 63 | 69 | Dorian Endler | Germany | 23:14.4 | 7 (3+4) | +3:50.6 |
| 64 | 41 | Cale Woods | United States | 23:15.3 | 4 (2+2) | +3:51.5 |
| 65 | 57 | Krasimir Atanasov | Bulgaria | 23:17.5 | 4 (1+3) | +3:53.7 |
| 66 | 60 | Arseniy Bezginov | Kazakhstan | 23:20.1 | 7 (2+5) | +3:56.3 |
| 67 | 50 | Imants Maļina | Latvia | 23:24.1 | 4 (1+3) | +4:00.3 |
| 67 | 78 | Daniel Oberegger | Italy | 23:24.1 | 6 (3+3) | +4:00.3 |
| 69 | 21 | Nicolae Girbacea | Romania | 23:25.4 | 5 (3+2) | +4:01.6 |
| 70 | 46 | Henri Heikkinen | Finland | 23:27.8 | 6 (1+5) | +4:04.0 |
| 71 | 26 | Cheon Yun-pil | South Korea | 23:33.5 | 4 (2+2) | +4:09.7 |
| 72 | 33 | Darius Dinda | Lithuania | 23:37.6 | 5 (1+4) | +4:13.8 |
| 73 | 4 | Ņikita Kondrašovs | Latvia | 23:41.2 | 5 (3+2) | +4:17.4 |
| 74 | 67 | Artsiom Krylenka | Belarus | 23:47.0 | 5 (2+3) | +4:23.2 |
| 75 | 11 | Van Ledger | United States | 23:49.6 | 5 (1+4) | +4:25.8 |
| 76 | 15 | Sven Kuprešak | Croatia | 23:57.5 | 4 (2+2) | +4:33.7 |
| 77 | 72 | Lucas Sadesky | Canada | 24:05.8 | 6 (3+3) | +4:42.0 |
| 78 | 70 | Matej Badáň | Slovakia | 24:07.2 | 3 (0+3) | +4:43.4 |
| 79 | 40 | Uroš Lalović | Bosnia and Herzegovina | 24:11.4 | 4 (1+3) | +4:47.6 |
| 80 | 48 | Domas Jankauskas | Lithuania | 24:21.5 | 5 (2+3) | +4:57.7 |
| 81 | 75 | Taiki Ito | Japan | 24:27.9 | 5 (2+3) | +5:04.1 |
| 82 | 45 | Angelos Antoniadis | Greece | 24:40.0 | 6 (4+2) | +5:16.2 |
| 83 | 25 | Bruno Matovič | Slovakia | 24:43.1 | 4 (2+2) | +5:19.3 |
| 84 | 39 | Finn Berg | Canada | 24:59.0 | 6 (3+3) | +5:35.2 |
| 85 | 14 | Omar Hodžić | Serbia | 25:09.6 | 6 (3+3) | +5:45.8 |
| 86 | 84 | Davor Škipina | Bosnia and Herzegovina | 25:11.0 | 6 (3+3) | +5:47.2 |
| 87 | 7 | Darko Krsteski | North Macedonia | 25:16.8 | 6 (3+3) | +5:53.0 |
| 88 | 71 | Deyan Razlozhki | Bulgaria | 25:27.6 | 7 (3+4) | +6:03.8 |
| 89 | 12 | Christian Mahon | Australia | 25:30.5 | 4 (2+2) | +6:06.7 |
| 90 | 55 | Keita Momen | Japan | 25:35.7 | 7 (3+4) | +6:11.9 |
| 91 | 43 | Marian Folea | Romania | 25:37.2 | 9 (4+5) | +6:13.4 |
| 92 | 24 | Victor Sendrea | Moldova | 26:34.1 | 6 (3+3) | +7:10.3 |
| 93 | 3 | Barış Oduncu | Turkey | 27:04.2 | 7 (3+4) | +7:40.4 |
| 94 | 42 | David Patterson | Australia | 27:09.5 | 5 (1+4) | +7:45.7 |
| 95 | 76 | Lukas Žukauskas | Lithuania | 27:49.3 | 7 (2+5) | +8:25.5 |
| 96 | 90 | Jonte Treasure | Australia | 29:25.0 | 7 (4+3) | +10:01.2 |
| | 35 | Jan Roth | Switzerland | Disqualified | | |
| | 16 | Aleksa Vuković | Bosnia and Herzegovina | Did not finish | | |
| | 87 | Markus Rene Epner | Estonia | Did not start | | |
