= Biathlon at the 2020 Winter Youth Olympics – Boys' individual =

Boys' individual at the III Winter Youth Olympic Games
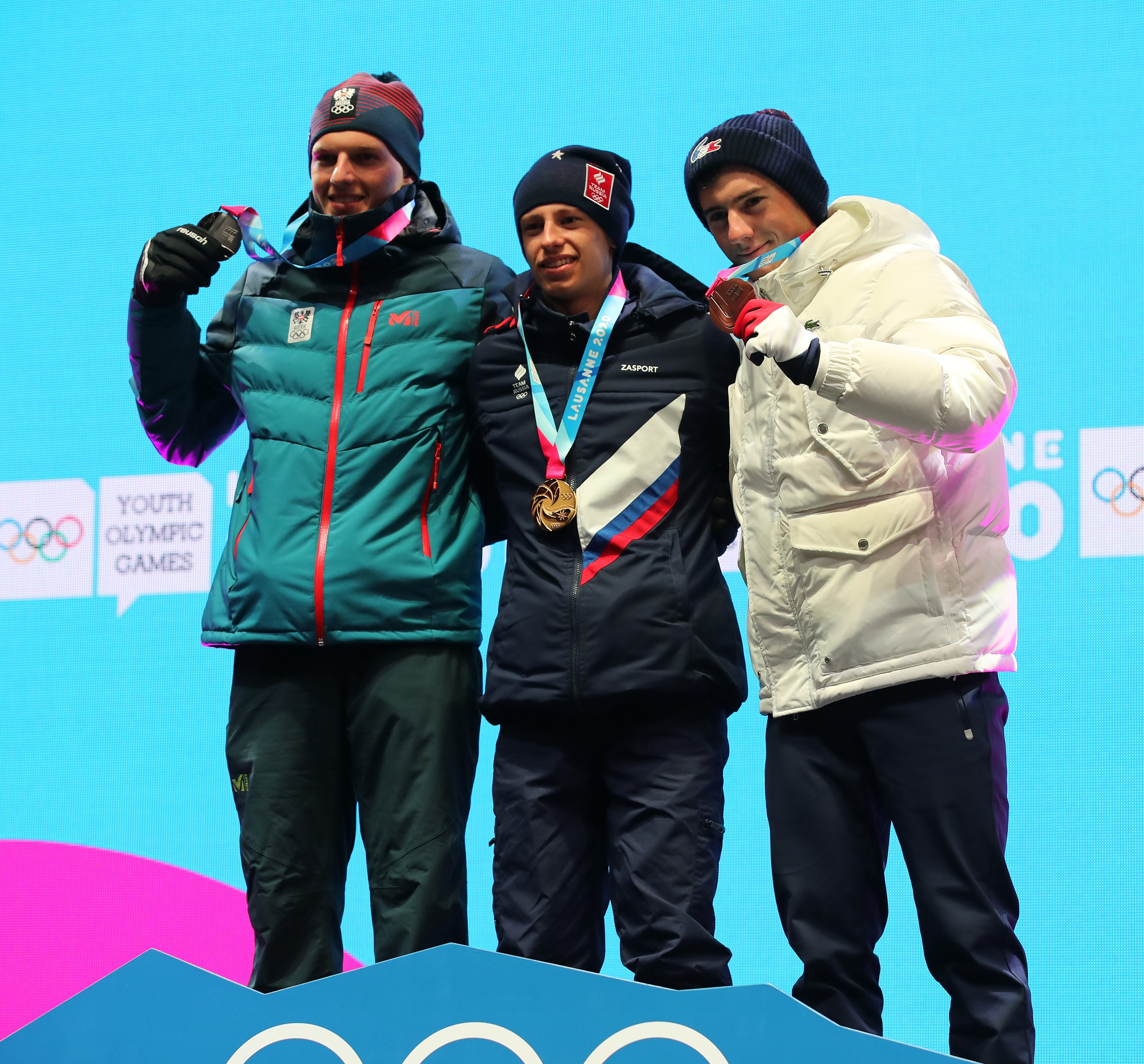
- Venue: Les Tuffes Nordic Centre
- Date: 11 January
- Competitors: 99 from 36 nations
- Winning time: 34:09.4

Medalists
1st place, gold medalist(s)		Oleg Domichek	Russia
2nd place, silver medalist(s)		Lukas Haslinger	Austria
3rd place, bronze medalist(s)		Mathieu Garcia	France

The boys' 12.5 km individual biathlon competition at the 2020 Winter Youth Olympics was held on 11 January at the Les Tuffes Nordic Centre.

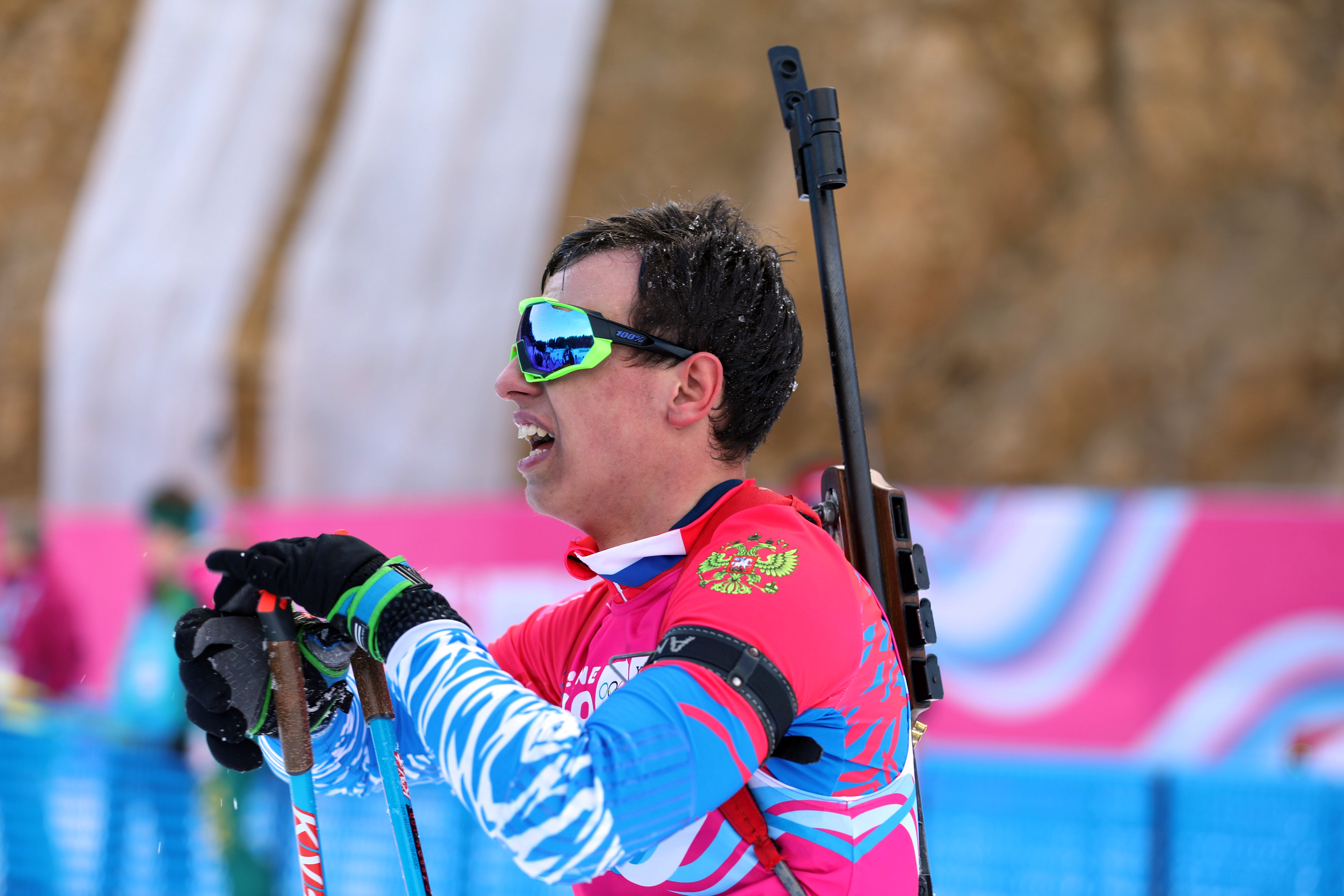
Oleg Domichek at the finish

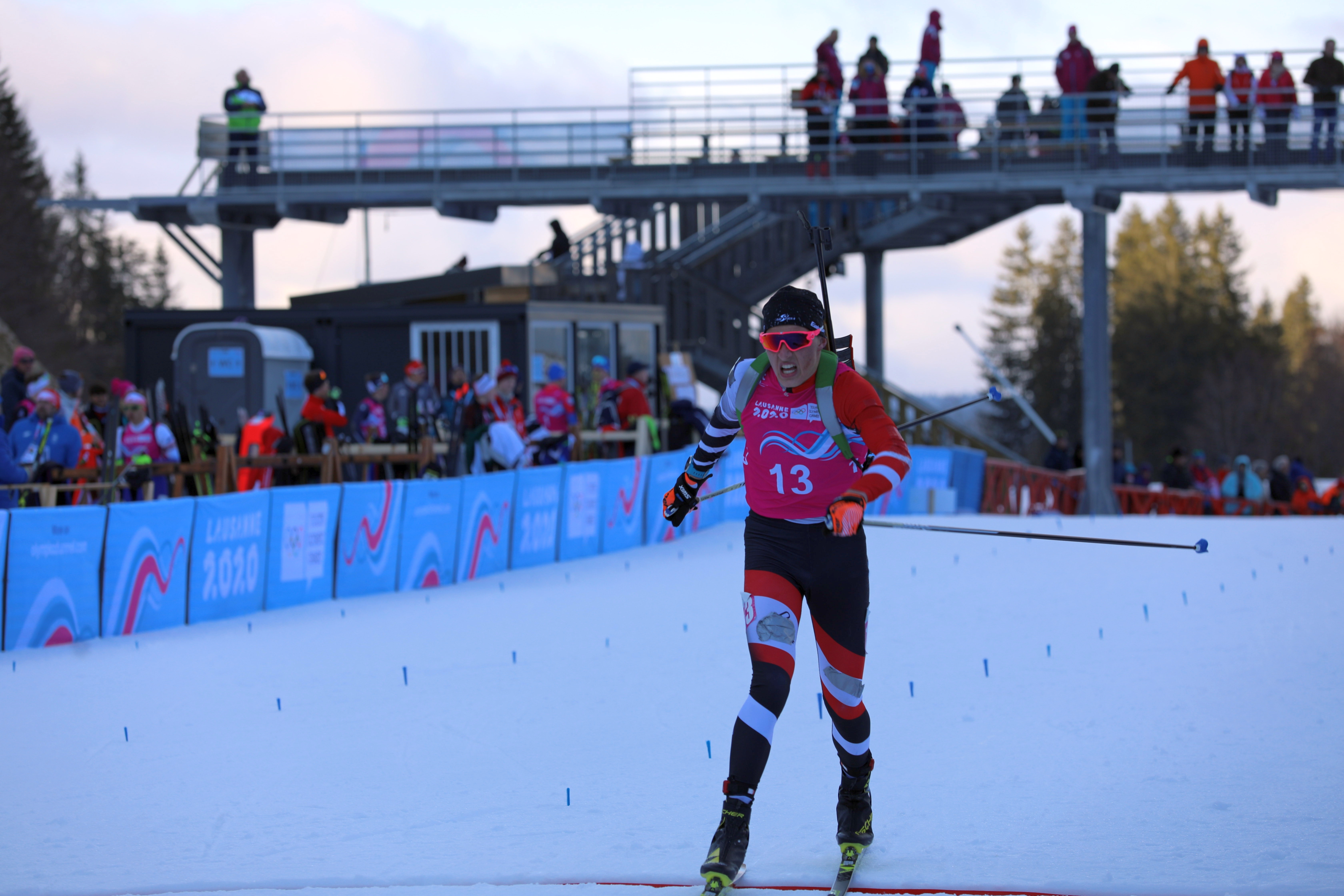
Lukas Haslinger crosses the finish line

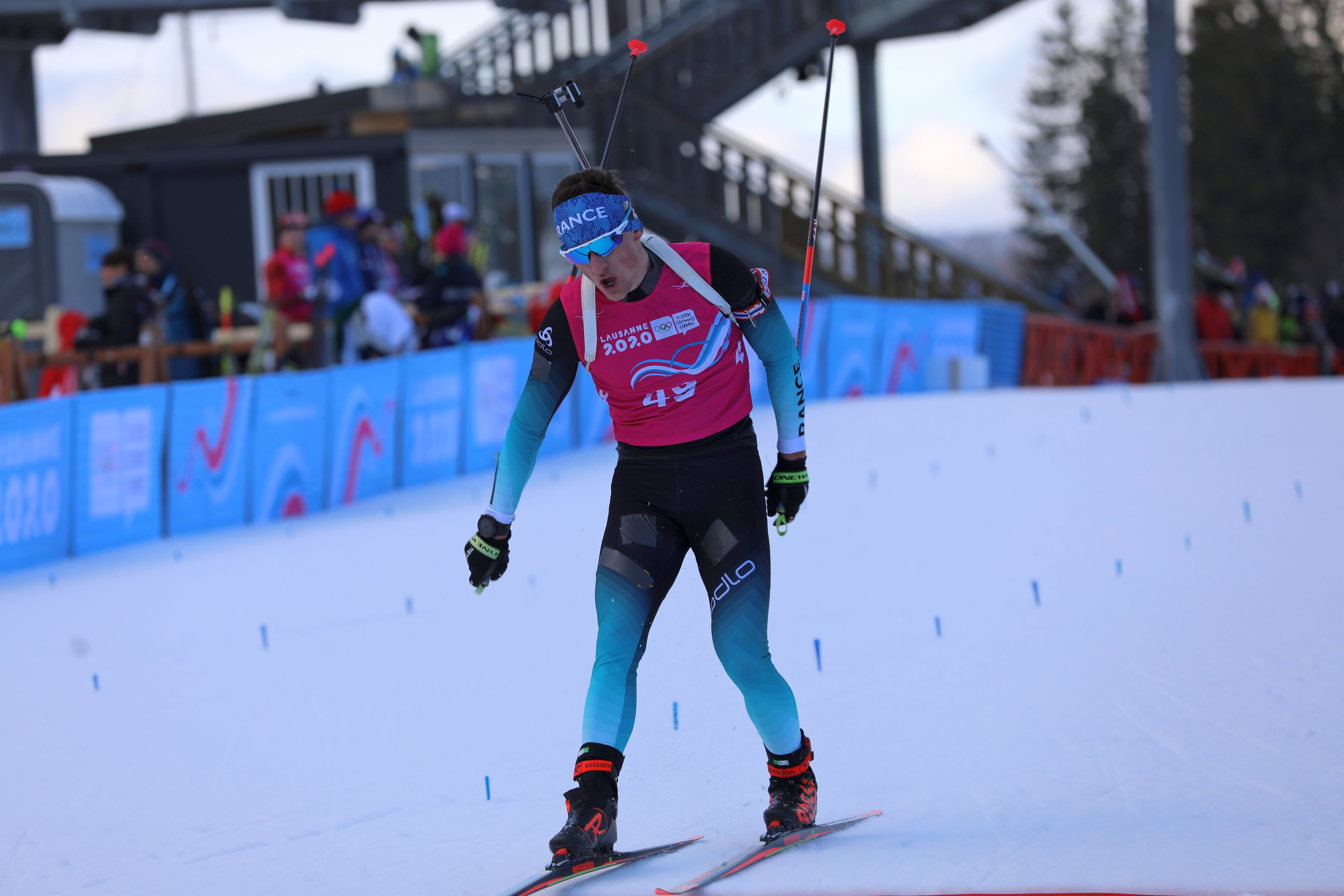
Mathieu Garcia crosses the finish line

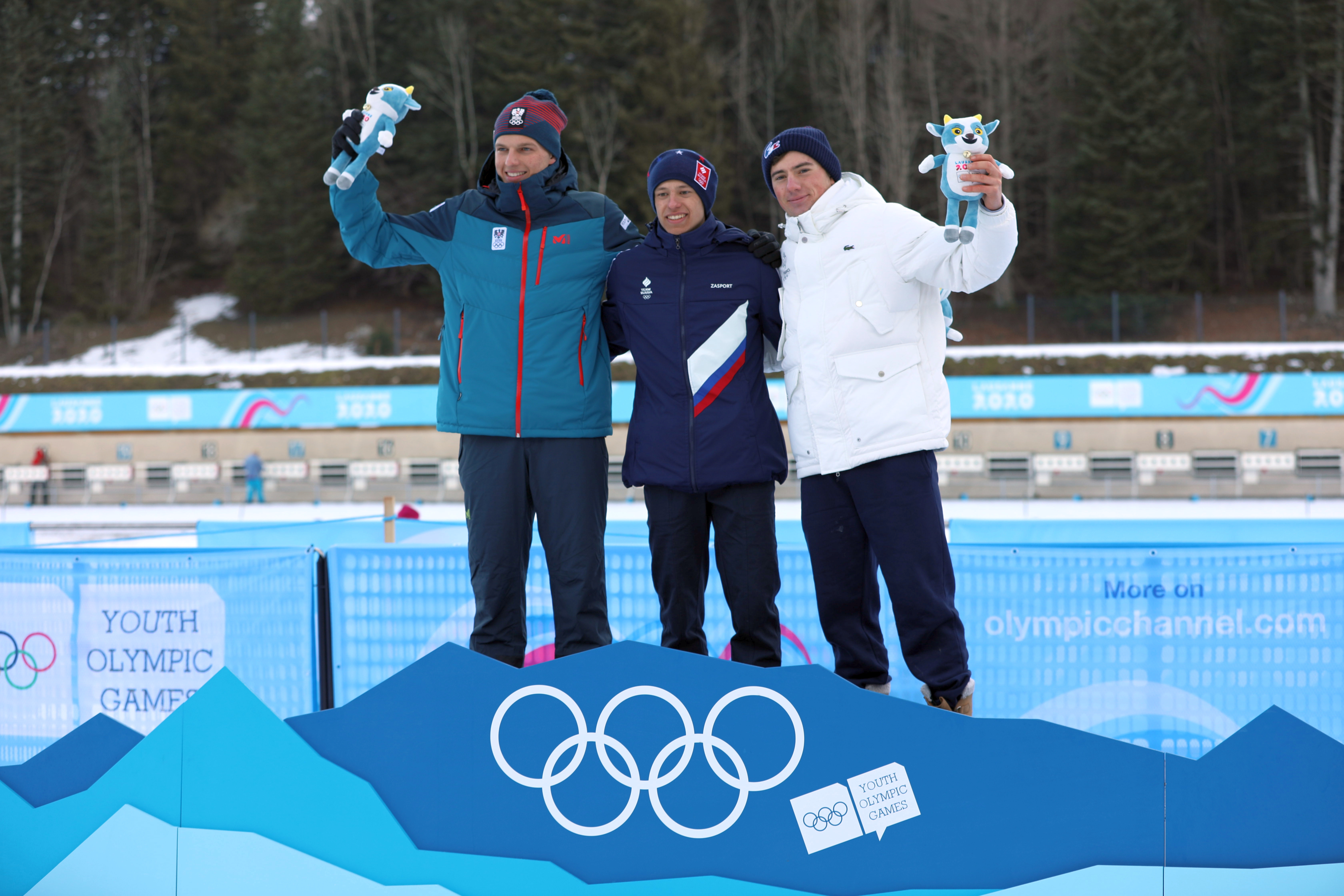
the medailists at the mascot ceremony

== Results ==
The race was started at 13:30.

Rank	Bib	Name	Country	Time	Penalties (P+S)	Deficit
1st place, gold medalist(s)	45	Oleg Domichek	Russia	34:09.4	2 (1+1+0+0)	
2nd place, silver medalist(s)	13	Lukas Haslinger	Austria	34:23.0	2 (1+1+0+0)	+13.6
3rd place, bronze medalist(s)	49	Mathieu Garcia	France	35:04.3	3 (2+0+0+1)	+54.9
4	5	Elias Asal	Germany	35:05.8	2 (1+0+0+1)	+56.4
5	21	Stian Fedreheim	Norway	35:13.8	3 (1+2+0+0)	+1:04.4
6	61	Campbell Wright	New Zealand	35:20.9	4 (0+1+3+0)	+1:11.5
7	18	Lou Thievent	France	35:37.2	3 (0+2+0+1)	+1:27.8
8	16	Stepan Kinash	Ukraine	35:58.7	3 (0+1+0+2)	+1:49.3
9	63	Vegard Thon	Norway	36:00.4	4 (0+0+1+3)	+1:51.0
10	47	Jan Guńka	Poland	36:08.1	6 (0+4+2+0)	+1:58.7
11	12	Marcin Zawół	Poland	36:09.3	4 (1+1+0+2)	+1:59.9
12	14	Enkhbatyn Enkhsaikhan	Mongolia	36:50.9	4 (1+1+1+1)	+2:41.5
13	30	Victor Berglund	Sweden	37:11.5	5 (1+2+1+1)	+3:02.1
14	32	Yanis Keller	Switzerland	37:20.2	5 (0+3+1+1)	+3:10.8
15	67	Fabian Hermansson	Sweden	37:20.5	3 (0+0+2+1)	+3:11.1
16	53	Oscar Andersson	Sweden	37:32.3	6 (1+1+3+1)	+3:22.9
16	78	Drejc Trojer	Slovenia	37:32.3	3 (0+3+0+0)	+3:22.9
18	97	Aubin Gautier-Pélissier	France	37:36.1	5 (2+2+0+1)	+3:26.7
19	59	Henri Heikkinen	Finland	37:37.6	5 (1+3+0+1)	+3:28.2
20	93	Mark Kozak	Ukraine	37:48.1	4 (2+0+1+1)	+3:38.7
21	96	Emil Hage Streitlien	Norway	37:56.0	6 (0+3+1+2)	+3:46.6
22	7	Marco Barale	Italy	37:59.2	7 (1+3+2+1)	+3:49.8
23	83	Isak Frey	Norway	38:04.2	8 (1+3+1+3)	+3:54.8
24	86	Konrad Badacz	Poland	38:04.8	7 (3+3+0+1)	+3:55.4
25	2	Jaša Zidar	Slovenia	38:06.9	5 (1+1+1+2)	+3:57.5
26	17	Aleksa Vuković	Bosnia and Herzegovina	38:11.0	3 (2+0+1+0)	+4:01.6
27	51	Florian Stasswender	Germany	38:11.1	4 (1+1+0+2)	+4:01.7
28	92	Pavel Lyashok	Russia	38:13.0	5 (0+2+2+1)	+4:03.6
29	50	Andrei Haurosh	Belarus	38:15.4	4 (1+1+0+2)	+4:06.0
30	39	Mark Vozelj	Slovenia	38:17.6	6 (1+3+1+1)	+4:08.2
31	68	Théo Guiraud-Poillot	France	38:32.5	7 (1+1+3+2)	+4:23.1
32	4	Vadim Kurales	Kazakhstan	38:32.8	7 (3+2+0+2)	+4:23.4
33	99	Jan Salzmann	Austria	38:44.2	5 (3+2+0+0)	+4:34.8
34	48	Arseniy Bezginov	Kazakhstan	38:45.6	6 (3+1+1+1)	+4:36.2
35	31	Ville-Valtteri Karvinen	Finland	38:46.0	6 (2+2+1+1)	+4:36.6
36	36	Ethan Algra	Canada	38:53.7	4 (1+0+3+0)	+4:44.3
37	19	Markus Rene Epner	Estonia	38:58.3	8 (3+1+2+2)	+4:48.9
38	91	Philipp Tumler	Italy	38:59.6	5 (0+3+0+2)	+4:50.2
39	1	Roman Morenkov	Russia	39:03.8	8 (2+2+2+2)	+4:54.4
40	79	Kanstantsin Baburau	Belarus	39:09.4	5 (1+2+1+1)	+5:00.0
41	81	Danil Chervenko	Kazakhstan	39:17.4	6 (0+2+2+2)	+5:08.0
42	43	Tuudor Palm	Estonia	39:25.6	7 (2+1+1+3)	+5:16.2
43	62	Nicolò Betemps	Italy	39:27.2	8 (4+1+2+1)	+5:17.8
44	70	Shi Yuanyuan	China	39:32.2	6 (2+1+2+1)	+5:22.8
45	95	Jan Roth	Switzerland	39:32.9	4 (0+2+1+1)	+5:23.5
46	90	Denis Irodov	Russia	39:37.4	9 (4+1+3+1)	+5:28.0
47	80	Kalle Loukkaanhuhta	Finland	39:43.9	5 (1+0+3+1)	+5:34.5
48	60	Vitalii Mandzyn	Ukraine	39:44.6	6 (1+2+0+3)	+5:35.2
49	40	Ņikita Kondrašovs	Latvia	39:53.4	4 (1+1+0+2)	+5:44.0
50	71	Leon Kienesberger	Austria	39:55.1	6 (1+2+0+3)	+5:45.7
51	41	Lukas Weissbacher	Austria	39:59.1	8 (2+3+1+2)	+5:49.7
52	3	Artsiom Krylenka	Belarus	40:09.2	5 (2+0+2+1)	+5:59.8
53	74	Petr Hak	Czech Republic	40:09.6	6 (1+3+0+2)	+6:00.2
54	38	Jakub Kudrnáč	Czech Republic	40:17.0	7 (2+2+1+2)	+6:07.6
55	27	Krasimir Atanasov	Bulgaria	40:30.6	6 (0+1+1+4)	+6:21.2
56	72	Imants Maļina	Latvia	40:35.7	5 (1+2+1+1)	+6:26.3
57	89	Serhii Kryshtal	Ukraine	40:45.5	7 (4+2+0+1)	+6:36.1
58	76	Dorian Endler	Germany	41:00.4	8 (4+3+0+1)	+6:51.0
59	35	Van Ledger	United States	41:03.5	6 (3+2+0+1)	+6:54.1
60	8	Victor Sendrea	Moldova	41:03.6	6 (1+2+2+1)	+6:54.2
61	52	Matěj Gregor	Slovakia	41:04.6	7 (2+2+2+1)	+6:55.2
62	84	Daniel Oberegger	Italy	41:15.8	9 (2+3+1+3)	+7:06.4
63	94	Jan Semirád	Czech Republic	41:20.7	8 (2+3+0+3)	+7:11.3
64	65	Cale Woods	United States	41:24.3	6 (0+3+0+3)	+7:14.9
65	75	Noé In Albon	Switzerland	41:25.0	8 (1+2+3+2)	+7:15.6
66	98	Franz Schaser	Germany	41:31.7	9 (3+3+0+3)	+7:22.3
67	42	Nicolae Girbacea	Romania	41:59.8	8 (2+3+1+2)	+7:50.4
68	34	Luděk Abrahám	Czech Republic	42:03.2	14 (5+2+3+4)	+7:53.8
69	24	Finn Berg	Canada	42:08.1	7 (2+1+3+1)	+7:58.7
70	57	Vasil Zashev	Bulgaria	42:18.3	10 (4+4+0+2)	+8:08.9
71	15	Chiharu Ueda	Japan	42:20.7	10 (2+4+2+2)	+8:11.3
72	54	Felix Ullmann	Switzerland	42:28.9	8 (3+1+3+1)	+8:19.5
73	46	Christian Mahon	Australia	42:30.4	4 (0+2+1+1)	+8:21.0
74	58	Gou Zhendong	China	42:32.2	10 (4+1+4+1)	+8:22.8
75	77	Andreas Koppa	Estonia	42:34.6	10 (4+2+1+3)	+8:25.2
76	28	Etienne Bordes	United States	42:39.8	8 (2+3+2+1)	+8:30.4
77	73	Domas Jankauskas	Lithuania	42:59.4	7 (2+2+1+2)	+8:50.0
78	29	Sven Kuprešak	Croatia	43:01.3	6 (1+0+3+2)	+8:51.9
79	20	Marian Folea	Romania	43:03.3	10 (3+1+4+2)	+8:53.9
80	23	Bruno Matovič	Slovakia	43:04.1	7 (3+1+1+2)	+8:54.7
81	44	Keita Momen	Japan	43:19.5	8 (3+3+1+1)	+9:10.1
82	22	Aleksandrs Kuzņecovs	Latvia	43:29.8	9 (2+2+2+3)	+9:20.4
83	9	Liu Zhaoyu	China	43:50.1	9 (4+0+3+2)	+9:40.7
84	33	Darius Dinda	Lithuania	44:05.8	11 (4+3+3+1)	+9:56.4
85	64	Deyan Razlozhki	Bulgaria	44:13.4	9 (2+1+3+3)	+10:04.0
86	10	Cheon Yun-pil	South Korea	44:24.7	10 (3+3+2+2)	+10:15.3
87	69	Lucas Sadesky	Canada	44:41.3	11 (2+3+3+3)	+10:31.9
88	11	Omar Hodžić	Serbia	45:16.4	10 (4+1+4+1)	+11:07.0
89	26	Darko Krsteski	North Macedonia	45:29.9	11 (4+2+2+3)	+11:20.5
90	66	Uroš Lalović	Bosnia and Herzegovina	45:37.6	10 (3+4+2+1)	+11:28.2
91	85	Taiki Ito	Japan	46:57.6	13 (3+5+4+1)	+12:48.2
92	56	Angelos Antoniadis	Greece	47:36.3	11 (2+3+2+4)	+13:26.9
93	87	Matej Badáň	Slovakia	48:39.2	13 (2+3+4+4)	+14:29.8
94	25	David Patterson	Australia	49:25.1	9 (2+2+2+3)	+15:15.7
95	37	Davor Škipina	Bosnia and Herzegovina	49:45.8	15 (4+4+3+4)	+15:36.4
96	55	Lukas Žukauskas	Lithuania	51:18.8	15 (4+5+3+3)	+17:09.4
97	6	Barış Oduncu	Turkey	52:47.4	15 (4+5+3+3)	+18:38.0
98	82	Jonte Treasure	Australia	54:15.6	13 (3+3+3+4)	+20:06.2
	88	Zalán Kovács	Romania	Disqualified		
