= Moldova at the 2020 Winter Youth Olympics =

- IOC code: MDA
- NOC: National Olympic Committee of the Republic of Moldova
- Website: www.olympic.md

in Lausanne
- Competitors: 5 in 2 sports
- Flag bearer: Victor Sendrea
- Medals: Gold 0 Silver 0 Bronze 0 Total 0

Winter Youth Olympics appearances
- 2012; 2016; 2020; 2024

Moldova competed at the 2020 Winter Youth Olympics in Lausanne, Switzerland from 9 to 22 January 2020.

== Biathlon ==
Boys

Athlete	Event	Time	Misses	Rank
Victor Sendrea	Sprint	26:34.1	6 (3+3)	92
Victor Sendrea	Individual	41:03.6	6 (1+2+2+1)	60

Girls

Athlete	Event	Time	Misses	Rank
Antonia Cebotari	Sprint	28:28.2	6 (1+5)	93
Antonia Cebotari	Individual	54:33.6	13 (1+4+4+4)	93

== Luge ==
Boys

Athlete	Event	Run 1		Run 2		Total	
Athlete	Event	Time	Rank	Time	Rank	Time	Rank
Marius Goncear	Singles	57.783	27	56.860	25	1:54.643	27

Girls

Athlete	Event	Run 1		Run 2		Total	
Athlete	Event	Time	Rank	Time	Rank	Time	Rank
Adriana Adam	Singles	58.779	24	59.199	24	1:57.978	24
Adriana Adam; Aliona Busuioc	Doubles	58.079	11	57.709	8	1:55.788	11

Mixed team relay

Athlete	Event	Girls' singles	Boys' singles	Doubles	Total	
Athlete	Event	Time	Time	Time	Time	Rank
Yuki Ishikawa (JPN); Marius Goncear (MDA); Adriana Adam / Aliona Busuioc (MDA)	Team relay	59.947	1:02.221	1:03.587	3:05.755	11

== See also ==
- Moldova at the 2020 Summer Olympics
