= Turkey at the 2020 Winter Youth Olympics =

- IOC code: TUR
- NOC: Turkish Olympic Committee
- Website: www.olimpiyatkomitesi.org.tr

in Lausanne
- Competitors: 14 in 5 sports
- Medals: Gold 0 Silver 0 Bronze 0 Total 0

Winter Youth Olympics appearances (overview)
- 2012; 2016; 2020; 2024

Turkey competed at the 2020 Winter Youth Olympics in Lausanne, Switzerland from 9 to 22 January 2020.

== Medalists ==
Medal	Name	Sport	Event	Date
Bronze	Sidre Özer	Ice hockey	Girls' 3x3 mixed tournament	15 January

== Alpine skiing ==
Boys

Athlete	Event	Run 1		Run 2		Total	
Athlete	Event	Time	Rank	Time	Rank	Time	Rank
Derin Berkin	Super-G	—N/a				1:02.61	55
Derin Berkin	Combined	1:02.61	55	36.87	30	1:39.48	34
Derin Berkin	Giant slalom	1:08.94	34	1:09.67	31	2:18.61	30
Derin Berkin	Slalom						

Girls

Athlete	Event	Run 1		Run 2		Total	
Athlete	Event	Time	Rank	Time	Rank	Time	Rank
Mina Baştan	Giant slalom	DNF					
Mina Baştan	Slalom						

== Biathlon ==
Boys

Athlete	Event	Time	Misses	Rank
Barış Oduncu	Sprint	27:04.2	7 (3+4)	93
Barış Oduncu	Individual	52:47.4	15 (4+5+3+3)	97

Girls

Athlete	Event	Time	Misses	Rank
Mine Kılıç	Sprint	22:17.0	3 (0+3)	68
Mine Kılıç	Individual	40:39.4	7 (2+2+1+2)	61

== Curling ==
Turkey qualified a mixed team of four athletes.

Mixed team

Team	Event	Group Stage						Quarterfinal	Semifinal	Final / BM	
Team	Event	Opposition Score	Opposition Score	Opposition Score	Opposition Score	Opposition Score	Rank	Opposition Score	Opposition Score	Opposition Score	Rank
Selahattin Eser; İfayet Şafak Çalıkuşu; Kadir Polat; Berfin Şengül	Mixed team	Norway; L 1–9	Great Britain; W 5–1	New Zealand; L 6–7	France; L 4–6	Slovenia; W 4–2	4	did not advance			16

Mixed doubles

Athletes	Event	Round of 48	Round of 24	Round of 12	Round of 6	Semifinals	Final / BM	
Athletes	Event	Opposition Result	Opposition Result	Opposition Result	Opposition Result	Opposition Result	Opposition Result	Rank
	Mixed doubles							

== See also ==
- Turkey at the 2020 Summer Olympics
