= Konstantina Charalampidou =

Greek cross-country skier

Personal information
- Nationality: Greece
- Born: 13 July 2002 (age 24) Drama, Greece

Konstantina Charalampidou (Greek: Κωνσταντίνα•Χαραλαμπίδου; born July 13, 2002) is a Greek cross-country skier and biathlete, who competed in the cross-country 10 km freestyle, and in the team sprint alongside Nefeli Tita at the 2026 Winter Olympics. She also competed in the sprint and individual biathlon competitions at the 2020 Winter Youth Olympics.
