= Bulgaria at the 2020 Winter Youth Olympics =

- IOC code: BUL
- NOC: Bulgarian Olympic Committee
- Website: www.bgolympic.org

in Lausanne
- Competitors: 18 in 8 sports
- Medals: Gold 0 Silver 0 Bronze 0 Total 0

Winter Youth Olympics appearances (overview)
- 2012; 2016; 2020; 2024

Bulgaria competed at the 2020 Winter Youth Olympics in Lausanne, Switzerland from 9 to 22 January 2020.

== Medalists ==
Medal	Name	Sport	Event	Date
Bronze	Maria Runevska	Ice hockey	Girls' 3x3 mixed tournament	15 January

== Alpine skiing ==
Boys

Athlete	Event	Run 1		Run 2		Total	
Athlete	Event	Time	Rank	Time	Rank	Time	Rank
Konstantin Stoilov	Super-G	—N/a				56.77	28
Konstantin Stoilov	Combined	56.77	28	35.08	14	1:31.85	15
Konstantin Stoilov	Giant slalom	1:05.39	19	1:05.72	15	2:11.11	16
Konstantin Stoilov	Slalom	38.19	11	DNF			

Girls

Athlete	Event	Run 1		Run 2		Total	
Athlete	Event	Time	Rank	Time	Rank	Time	Rank
Julia Zlatkova	Super-G	—N/a				DNF	
Julia Zlatkova	Combined	DNF					
Julia Zlatkova	Giant slalom	1:10.30	33	1:09.08	26	2:19.38	24
Julia Zlatkova	Slalom	49.03	26	48.54	23	1:37.57	21

== Biathlon ==
Boys

Athlete	Event	Time	Misses	Rank
Krasimir Atanasov	Sprint	23:17.5	4 (1+3)	65
Krasimir Atanasov	Individual	40:30.6	6 (0+1+1+4)	55
Deyan Razlozhki	Sprint	25:27.6	7 (3+4)	88
Deyan Razlozhki	Individual	44:13.4	9 (2+1+3+3)	85
Vasil Zashev	Sprint	20:39.3	2 (1+1)	17
Vasil Zashev	Individual	42:18.3	10 (4+4+0+2)	70

Girls

Athlete	Event	Time	Misses	Rank
Valentina Dimitrova	Sprint	19:47.2	1 (1+0)	11
Valentina Dimitrova	Individual	36:20.0	5 (2+3+0+0)	17
Lora Hristova	Sprint	20:57.7	2 (1+1)	44
Lora Hristova	Individual	40:23.7	9 (3+2+3+1)	57
Lora Radkovska	Sprint	23:40.2	3 (2+1)	80
Lora Radkovska	Individual	41:54.7	6 (2+0+1+3)	70

Mixed

Athletes	Event	Time	Misses	Rank
Valentina Dimitrova; Vasil Zashev	Single mixed relay	45:29.7	3+19	15
Valentina Dimitrova; Lora Hristova; Krasimir Atanasov; Vasil Zashev	Mixed relay	1:18:17.2	2+12	14

== Cross-country skiing ==
Boys

Athlete	Event	Qualification		Quarterfinal		Semifinal		Final	
Athlete	Event	Time	Rank	Time	Rank	Time	Rank	Time	Rank
Aleksandar Ognyanov	10 km classic	—N/a						30:24.7	46
Aleksandar Ognyanov	Free sprint	3:41.97	59	Did not advance					
Aleksandar Ognyanov	Cross-country cross	5:00.85	62	Did not advance					

== Figure skating ==
Singles

Athletes	Event	SP		FS		Total	
Athletes	Event	Points	Rank	Points	Rank	Points	Rank
Ivelina Baycheva	Girls	43.90	16	84.93	15	128.83	15

== Ice hockey ==
=== Mixed NOC 3x3 tournament ===
Boys

- Nino Tomov

Girls

- Maria Runevska

== Luge ==
Athlete	Event	Run 1		Run 2		Total	
Athlete	Event	Time	Rank	Time	Rank	Time	Rank
Milen Milanov	Boys' singles	57.018	25	57.509	27	1:54.527	26
Nedyalko Ivanov; Milen Milanov	Boys' doubles	56.580	8	57.185	7	1:53.765	7

== Short track speed skating ==
Athlete	Event	Heats		Quarterfinal		Semifinal		Final	
Athlete	Event	Time	Rank	Time	Rank	Time	Rank	Time	Rank
Lubomir Kalchev	Boys' 500 m	No time		Did not advance					29
Lubomir Kalchev	Boys' 1000 m	1:33.231	3	Did not advance					21

== Snowboarding ==
Snowboard cross

Athlete	Event	Group heats		Semifinal	Final
Athlete	Event	Points	Rank	Position	Position
Vladi Kamburov	Boys' snowboard cross	10	11	Did not advance	
Teodora Ilieva	Girls' snowboard cross	13	8	Did not advance	

== See also ==
- Bulgaria at the 2020 Summer Olympics
