= Czech Republic at the 2020 Winter Youth Olympics =

- IOC code: CZE
- NOC: Czech Olympic Committee
- Website: www.olympic.cz

in Lausanne
- Competitors: 74 in 14 sports
- Flag bearers: Andrea Trnková & Timon Drahoňovský
- Medals Ranked 17th: Gold 1 Silver 2 Bronze 1 Total 4

Winter Youth Olympics appearances (overview)
- 2012; 2016; 2020; 2024

Czech Republic competed at the 2020 Winter Youth Olympics in Lausanne, Switzerland from 9 to 22 January 2020.

== Medalists ==
Medals awarded to participants of mixed-NOC teams are represented in italics. These medals are not counted towards the individual NOC medal tally.

| Medal | Name | Sport | Event | Date |
|---|---|---|---|---|
| Gold | Štěpán Maleček | Ice hockey | Boys' 3x3 mixed tournament | 15 January |
| Gold | Zuzana Trnková | Ice hockey | Girls' 3x3 mixed tournament | 15 January |
| Gold | Matěj Švancer | Freestyle skiing | Boys' big air | 22 January |
| Silver | Zuzana Kuršová | Speed skating | Girls' mass start | 16 January |
| Silver | Diana Cholenská | Freestyle skiing | Girls' ski cross | 19 January |
| Bronze | Matyáš Šapovaliv | Ice hockey | Boys' 3x3 mixed tournament | 15 January |
| Bronze | Štěpánka Ptáčková | Ski jumping | Girls' normal hill individual | 19 January |
| Bronze | Vít Chabičovský | Curling | Mixed doubles | 22 January |

== Alpine skiing ==
Boys

| Athlete | Event | Run 1 | | Run 2 | | Total | |
| Athlete | Event | Time | Rank | Time | Rank | Time | Rank |
|---|---|---|---|---|---|---|---|
| David Kubeš | Super-G | —N/a | | | | 55.01 | 5 |
| David Kubeš | Combined | 55.01 | 5 | 35.69 | 20 | 1:30.70 | 13 |
| David Kubeš | Giant slalom | 1:05.14 | 16 | 1:05.44 | 12 | 2:10.58 | 13 |
| David Kubeš | Slalom | 39.11 | 22 | 42.02 | 22 | 1:21.13 | 19 |

Girls

| Athlete | Event | Run 1 | | Run 2 | | Total | |
| Athlete | Event | Time | Rank | Time | Rank | Time | Rank |
|---|---|---|---|---|---|---|---|
| Barbora Nováková | Super-G | —N/a | | | | DNF | |
| Barbora Nováková | Combined | DNF | | | | | |
| Barbora Nováková | Giant slalom | 1:07.42 | 24 | 1:05.81 | 20 | 2:13.23 | 18 |
| Barbora Nováková | Slalom | DNS | | | | | |

== Biathlon ==
Boys

| Athlete | Event | Time | Misses | Rank |
|---|---|---|---|---|
| Luděk Abrahám | Sprint | 20:13.3 | 4 (2+2) | 9 |
| Luděk Abrahám | Individual | 42:03.2 | 14 (5+2+3+4) | 68 |
| Petr Hak | Sprint | 21:53.0 | 3 (0+3) | 35 |
| Petr Hak | Individual | 40:09.6 | 6 (1+3+0+2) | 53 |
| Jakub Kudrnáč | Sprint | 21:24.5 | 3 (2+1) | 26 |
| Jakub Kudrnáč | Individual | 40:17.0 | 7 (2+2+1+2) | 54 |
| Jan Semirád | Sprint | 22:50.6 | 4 (3+1) | 55 |
| Jan Semirád | Individual | 41:20.7 | 8 (2+3+0+3) | 63 |

Girls

| Athlete | Event | Time | Misses | Rank |
|---|---|---|---|---|
| Zuzana Doležalová | Sprint | 20:44.7 | 3 (0+3) | 37 |
| Zuzana Doležalová | Individual | 36:34.2 | 5 (3+0+0+2) | 19 |
| Gabriela Masaříková | Sprint | 20:45.9 | 4 (2+2) | 41 |
| Gabriela Masaříková | Individual | 35:29.5 | 4 (1+1+0+2) | 12 |
| Svatava Mikysková | Sprint | 21:03.0 | 2 (0+2) | 46 |
| Svatava Mikysková | Individual | 40:25.1 | 9 (3+3+2+1) | 58 |
| Kateřina Pavlů | Sprint | 21:01.4 | 2 (0+2) | 45 |
| Kateřina Pavlů | Individual | 38:22.3 | 6 (1+3+1+1) | 40 |

Mixed

| Athletes | Event | Time | Misses | Rank |
|---|---|---|---|---|
| Kateřina Pavlů; Jakub Kudrnáč | Single mixed relay | 42:52.9 | 2+9 | 5 |
| Gabriela Masaříková; Zuzana Doležalová; Luděk Abrahám; Jakub Kudrnáč | Mixed relay | 1:12:57.9 | 2+15 | 4 |

== Cross-country skiing ==
Boys

| Athlete | Event | Qualification | | Quarterfinal | | Semifinal | | Final | |
| Athlete | Event | Time | Rank | Time | Rank | Time | Rank | Time | Rank |
|---|---|---|---|---|---|---|---|---|---|
| Šimon Pavlásek | 10 km classic | —N/a | | | | | | 28:26.5 | 17 |
| Šimon Pavlásek | Freestyle sprint | 3:24.06 | 21 | 3:30.97 | 4 | Did not advance | | | |
| Šimon Pavlásek | Cross-country cross | 4:37.62 | 35 | —N/a | | Did not advance | | | |
| Mathias Vacek | 10 km classic | —N/a | | | | | | 28:16.3 | 15 |
| Mathias Vacek | Freestyle sprint | 3:21.80 | 15 | 3:23.52 | 3 | 3:23.77 | 6 | Did not advance | |
| Mathias Vacek | Cross-country cross | 4:32.34 | 22 | —N/a | | 4:29.56 | 10 | Did not advance | |
| Kryštof Zatloukal | 10 km classic | —N/a | | | | | | 30:21.5 | 44 |
| Kryštof Zatloukal | Freestyle sprint | 3:31.32 | 40 | Did not advance | | | | | |
| Kryštof Zatloukal | Cross-country cross | 4:42.59 | 45 | —N/a | | Did not advance | | | |

Girls

| Athlete | Event | Qualification | | Quarterfinal | | Semifinal | | Final | |
| Athlete | Event | Time | Rank | Time | Rank | Time | Rank | Time | Rank |
|---|---|---|---|---|---|---|---|---|---|
| Tereza Prokešová | 5 km classic | —N/a | | | | | | 16:27.0 | 38 |
| Tereza Prokešová | Freestyle sprint | 3:00.24 | 33 | Did not advance | | | | | |
| Tereza Prokešová | Cross-country cross | 5:30.73 | 36 | —N/a | | Did not advance | | | |
| Eliška Šibravová | 5 km classic | —N/a | | | | | | 15:48.4 | 24 |
| Eliška Šibravová | Freestyle sprint | 2:58.23 | 30 | 2:59.90 | 6 | Did not advance | | | |
| Eliška Šibravová | Cross-country cross | 5:26.88 | 31 | —N/a | | Did not advance | | | |
| Kateřina Svobodová | 5 km classic | —N/a | | | | | | 16:45.9 | 44 |
| Kateřina Svobodová | Freestyle sprint | 3:02.58 | 40 | Did not advance | | | | | |
| Kateřina Svobodová | Cross-country cross | 5:43.31 | 47 | —N/a | | Did not advance | | | |

== Curling ==
Czech Republic qualified a mixed team of four athletes.

Mixed team

| Team | Event | Group stage | | | | | | Quarterfinal | Semifinal | Final / BM | |
| Team | Event | Opposition Score | Opposition Score | Opposition Score | Opposition Score | Opposition Score | Rank | Opposition Score | Opposition Score | Opposition Score | Rank |
|---|---|---|---|---|---|---|---|---|---|---|---|
| Vít Chabičovský; Kristyna Farková; František Jiral; Zuzana Pražáková | Mixed team | Latvia; W 7 – 0 | Japan; L 1 – 8 | Sweden; L 2 – 8 | United States; W 6 – 4 | Italy; W 6 – 2 | 4 | Did not advance | | | 14 |

Mixed doubles

| Athletes | Event | Round of 48 | Round of 24 | Round of 12 | Round of 6 | Semifinals | Final / BM | |
| Athletes | Event | Opposition Result | Opposition Result | Opposition Result | Opposition Result | Opposition Result | Opposition Result | Rank |
|---|---|---|---|---|---|---|---|---|
| Zuzana Pražáková (CZE); Moon Si-woo (KOR) | Mixed doubles | Kobayashi (JPN); Tuaz (FRA); L 5 – 6 | Did not advance | | | | | |
| Pei Junhang (CHN) Vít Chabičovský (CZE) | Mixed doubles | Joo (HUN); Piffer (ITA); W 9 – 5 | Hallstroem (SWE); Szmidt (POL); W 12 – 3 | Gregori (SLO); Winz (SUI); W 8 – 2 | Vergnaud (FRA); Buraas (NOR); W 7 – 3 | Beitone (FRA); Lysakov (RUS); L 5 – 10 | Kobayashi (JPN); Tuaz (FRA); W 7 – 3 | 3rd place, bronze medalist(s) |
| Robyn Mitchell (GBR); František Jiral (CZE) | Mixed doubles | Rigler (SLO); Kapp (GER); W 8 – 5 | Park (KOR); Kaminski (POL); W 6 – 5 | Nagy (HUN); Young (CAN); L 4 – 7 | Did not advance | | | |
| Kristýna Farková (CZE); Axel Landelius (SWE) | Mixed doubles | Østgård (NOR); Velve (BRA); W 11 – 6 | Wiksten (DEN); Craik (GBR); W 12 – 6 | Wosinska (POL); Zhang (CHN); L 4 – 5 | Did not advance | | | |

== Figure skating ==
One male figure skaters achieved quota places for Czech Republic based on the results of the 2019 World Junior Figure Skating Championships.

Singles

| Athlete | Event | SP | | FS | | Total | |
| Athlete | Event | Points | Rank | Points | Rank | Points | Rank |
|---|---|---|---|---|---|---|---|
| Daniel Mrázek | Boys' singles | 60.66 | 8 | 96.32 | 13 | 156.98 | 11 |

Couples

| Athlete | Event | SD | | FD | | Total | |
| Athlete | Event | Points | Rank | Points | Rank | Points | Rank |
|---|---|---|---|---|---|---|---|
| Denisa Cimlová; Vilém Hlavsa | Ice dancing | 50.06 | 8 | 80.97 | 7 | 131.03 | 8 |

== Freestyle skiing ==
Ski cross

| Athlete | Event | Group heats | | Semifinal | Final | |
| Athlete | Event | Points | Rank | Position | Position | Rank |
|---|---|---|---|---|---|---|
| Josef Petřek | Boys' ski cross | 12 | 9 | Did not advance | | 17 |
| Richard Zachoval | Boys' ski cross | 13 | 7 | Did not advance | | 15 |
| Diana Cholenská | Girls' ski cross | 20 | 1 | 1 | 2 | 2nd place, silver medalist(s) |
| Hanka Krčálová | Girls' ski cross | 2 | 12 | Did not advance | | 24 |

Slopestyle & Big Air

| Athlete | Event | Qualification | | | | Final | | | | |
| Athlete | Event | Run 1 | Run 2 | Best | Rank | Run 1 | Run 2 | Run 3 | Best | Rank |
|---|---|---|---|---|---|---|---|---|---|---|
| Štěpán Hudeček | Boys' big air | 78.25 | 43.00 | 78.25 | 7 | 43.25 | 19.25 | 30.00 | 73.25 | 11 |
| Štěpán Hudeček | Boys' slopestyle | 38.00 | 10.00 | 38.00 | 21 | Did not advance | | | | |
| Matěj Švancer | Boys' big air | 20.75 | 78.00 | 78.00 | 8 | 91.50 | 78.00 | 94.50 | 186.00 | 1st place, gold medalist(s) |
| Matěj Švancer | Boys' slopestyle | 91.00 | 95.00 | 95.00 | 1 | 85.00 | 84.33 | 27.66 | 85.00 | 4 |

== Ice hockey ==
=== Girls' tournament ===
Summary

Key:

- OT – Overtime
- GWS – Match decided by penalty-shootout

| Team | Event | Group stage | | | Semifinal | Final | |
| Team | Event | Opposition Score | Opposition Score | Rank | Opposition Score | Opposition Score | Rank |
|---|---|---|---|---|---|---|---|
| Czech Republic girls' | Girls' tournament | Switzerland L 0 – 1 GWS | Japan L 1 – 4 | 3 | Did not advance | | 5 |

== Luge ==
Boys

| Athlete | Event | Run 1 | | Run 2 | | Total | |
| Athlete | Event | Time | Rank | Time | Rank | Time | Rank |
|---|---|---|---|---|---|---|---|
| Jakub Vepřovský | Singles | 56.515 | 23 | 56.397 | 20 | 1:52.912 | 22 |

Girls

| Athlete | Event | Run 1 | | Run 2 | | Total | |
| Athlete | Event | Time | Rank | Time | Rank | Time | Rank |
|---|---|---|---|---|---|---|---|
| Anna Čežíková | Singles | 56.604 | 19 | 56.395 | 20 | 1:52.999 | 20 |
| Markéta Nováková; Anna Vejdělková | Doubles | 56.790 | 8 | 58.068 | 9 | 1:54.858 | 9 |

== Nordic combined ==
Individual

| Athlete | Event | Ski jumping | | | | Cross-country | | Total | |
| Athlete | Event | Distance | Points | Rank | Deficit | Time | Rank | Time Behind Winner | Rank |
|---|---|---|---|---|---|---|---|---|---|
| Lukas Kohlberger | Normal hill/6 km | 69.0 | 72.5 | 26 | 3:12 | 16:30.1 | 24 | +4:56.3 | 26 |
| Jan Šimek | Normal hill/6 km | 77.5 | 94.9 | 22 | 1:43 | 15:43.4 | 14 | +2:40.6 | 20 |
| Jolana Hradilová | Normal hill/4 km | 57.0 | 61.2 | 23 | 3:16 | 13:13.6 | 22 | +4:44.0 | 23 |
| Tereza Koldovská | Normal hill/4 km | 68.0 | 81.7 | 18 | 2:15 | 13:33.5 | 23 | +4:02.9 | 22 |

Nordic mixed team

| Athlete | Event | Ski jumping | | | Cross-country | | Total | |
| Athlete | Event | Points | Rank | Deficit | Time | Rank | Time behind winners | Rank |
|---|---|---|---|---|---|---|---|---|
| Tereza Koldovská Jan Šimek Štěpánka Ptáčková Jiří Konvalinka Eliška Šibravová Mathias Vacek | Nordic mixed team | 398.3 | 6 | 1:56 | 32:11.9 | 10 | +4:47.4 | 10 |

== Short track speed skating ==
One female skaters achieved quota places for Czech Republic based on the results of the 2019 World Junior Short Track Speed Skating Championships.

Girls

| Athlete | Event | Heats | | Quarterfinal | | Semifinal | | Final | | Classification |
| Athlete | Event | Time | Rank | Time | Rank | Time | Rank | Time | Rank | Classification |
|---|---|---|---|---|---|---|---|---|---|---|
| Markéta Fajkusová | 500 m | 46.259 | 3 | Did not advance | | | | | | 21 |
| Markéta Fajkusová | 1000 m | 2:01.616 | 3 | Did not advance | | | | | | 24 |

== Skeleton ==
| Athlete | Event | Run 1 | | Run 2 | | Total | |
| Athlete | Event | Time | Rank | Time | Rank | Time | Rank |
|---|---|---|---|---|---|---|---|
| Timon Drahoňovský | Boys | 1:11.47 | 13 | 1:11.73 | 16 | 2:23.20 | 14 |

== Ski jumping ==
Boys

| Athlete | Event | First round | | | Final | | | Total | |
| Athlete | Event | Distance | Points | Rank | Distance | Points | Rank | Points | Rank |
|---|---|---|---|---|---|---|---|---|---|
| Jiří Konvalinka | Normal hill | 81.5 | 106.0 | 12 | 83.0 | 108.7 | 13 | 214.7 | 11 |
| Petr Vaverka | Normal hill | 74.0 | 90.1 | 25 | 78.5 | 95.2 | 23 | 185.3 | 25 |

Girls

| Athlete | Event | First round | | | Final | | | Total | |
| Athlete | Event | Distance | Points | Rank | Distance | Points | Rank | Points | Rank |
|---|---|---|---|---|---|---|---|---|---|
| Štěpánka Ptáčková | Normal hill | 80.0 | 109.7 | 4 | 83.5 | 104.9 | 2 | 214.6 | 3rd place, bronze medalist(s) |
| Klára Ulrichová | Normal hill | 78.0 | 100.3 | 9 | 76.0 | 89.4 | 7 | 189.7 | 8 |

== Snowboarding ==
Snowboard cross

| Athlete | Event | Group heats | | Semifinal | Final |
| Athlete | Event | Points | Rank | Position | Position |
|---|---|---|---|---|---|
| Matouš Šmerák | Boys' snowboard cross | 17 | 3 | 4 | 6 (2nd in small final) |
| Karolína Dobrá | Girls' snowboard cross | 7 | 7 | Did not advance | |
| Sára Strnadová | Girls' snowboard cross | 16 | 4 | 3 | 7 (3rd in small final) |

Halfpipe, Slopestyle, & Big Air

| Athlete | Event | Qualification | | | | Final | | | | |
| Athlete | Event | Run 1 | Run 2 | Best | Rank | Run 1 | Run 2 | Run 3 | Best | Rank |
|---|---|---|---|---|---|---|---|---|---|---|
| Marie Kreisingerová | Girls' big air | 56.00 | 18.33 | 56.00 | 7 | 57.00 | 25.50 | DNS | 82.50 | 7 |
| Marie Kreisingerová | Girls' slopestyle | 40.50 | 37.50 | 40.50 | 9 | 5.50 | DNS | DNS | 5.50 | 11 |

== Speed skating ==
Boys

| Athlete | Event | Time | Rank |
|---|---|---|---|
| Jakub Kočí | 500 m | 41.64 | 30 |
| Jakub Kočí | 1500 m | 2:03.54 | 22 |
| Lukáš Steklý | 500 m | 41.12 | 29 |
| Lukáš Steklý | 1500 m | 2:04.00 | 23 |

Girls

| Athlete | Event | Time | Rank |
|---|---|---|---|
| Zuzana Kuršová | 500 m | 44.67 | 31 |
| Zuzana Kuršová | 1500 m | 2:18.65 | 14 |
| Kateřina Macháčková | 500 m | 45.89 | 32 |
| Kateřina Macháčková | 1500 m | 2:22.84 | 25 |

Mass Start

| Athlete | Event | Semifinal | | | Final | | |
| Athlete | Event | Points | Time | Rank | Points | Time | Rank |
|---|---|---|---|---|---|---|---|
| Jakub Kočí | Boys' mass start | 0 | 6:34.64 | 11 | Did not advance | | |
| Lukáš Steklý | Boys' mass start | 0 | 5:55.71 | 10 | Did not advance | | |
| Zuzana Kuršová | Girls' mass start | 3 | 6:15.28 | 5 Q | 25 | 6:50.90 | 2nd place, silver medalist(s) |
| Kateřina Macháčková | Girls' mass start | 0 | 6:53.27 | 11 | Did not advance | | |

Mixed

| Athlete | Event | Time | Rank |
|---|---|---|---|
| Team 1 Kateřina Macháčková (CZE); Isabel Grevelt (NED); Max Fiodarav (BLR); Felix Motschmann (GER) | Mixed team sprint | 2:08.16 | 9 |
| Team 2 Zuzana Kuršová (CZE); Wang Jingyi (CHN); Manuel Zähringer (GER); Andrei Herman (BLR) | Mixed team sprint | 2:09.32 | 11 |
| Team 6 Julie Berg Sjøbrend (NOR); Anna Ostlender (GER); Jakub Kočí (CZE); Sebas Diniz (NED) | Mixed team sprint | Disqualified | |
| Team 7 Varvara Bandaryna (BLR); Myrthe de Boer (NED); Lukáš Šteklý (CZE); Yudai Yamamoto (JPN) | Mixed team sprint | 2:06.80 | 5 |

== See also ==
- Czech Republic at the 2020 Summer Olympics
