= Nordic combined at the Winter Youth Olympics =

Nordic combined at a multi-sport event

- Events: 3 (men: 1; women: 1; mixed: 1)

Games
- 2010; 2014; 2018

Nordic combined is one of the sports featured at the Winter Youth Olympics. It has been part of the games since the inaugural edition in 2012.

Nordic combined skier also competed in mixed team ski jumping event at the 2012 Games. Ski jumpers competed in the Nordic mixed team event at the 2016 and 2020 Games.

== Medal summaries ==
=== Boys' individual ===
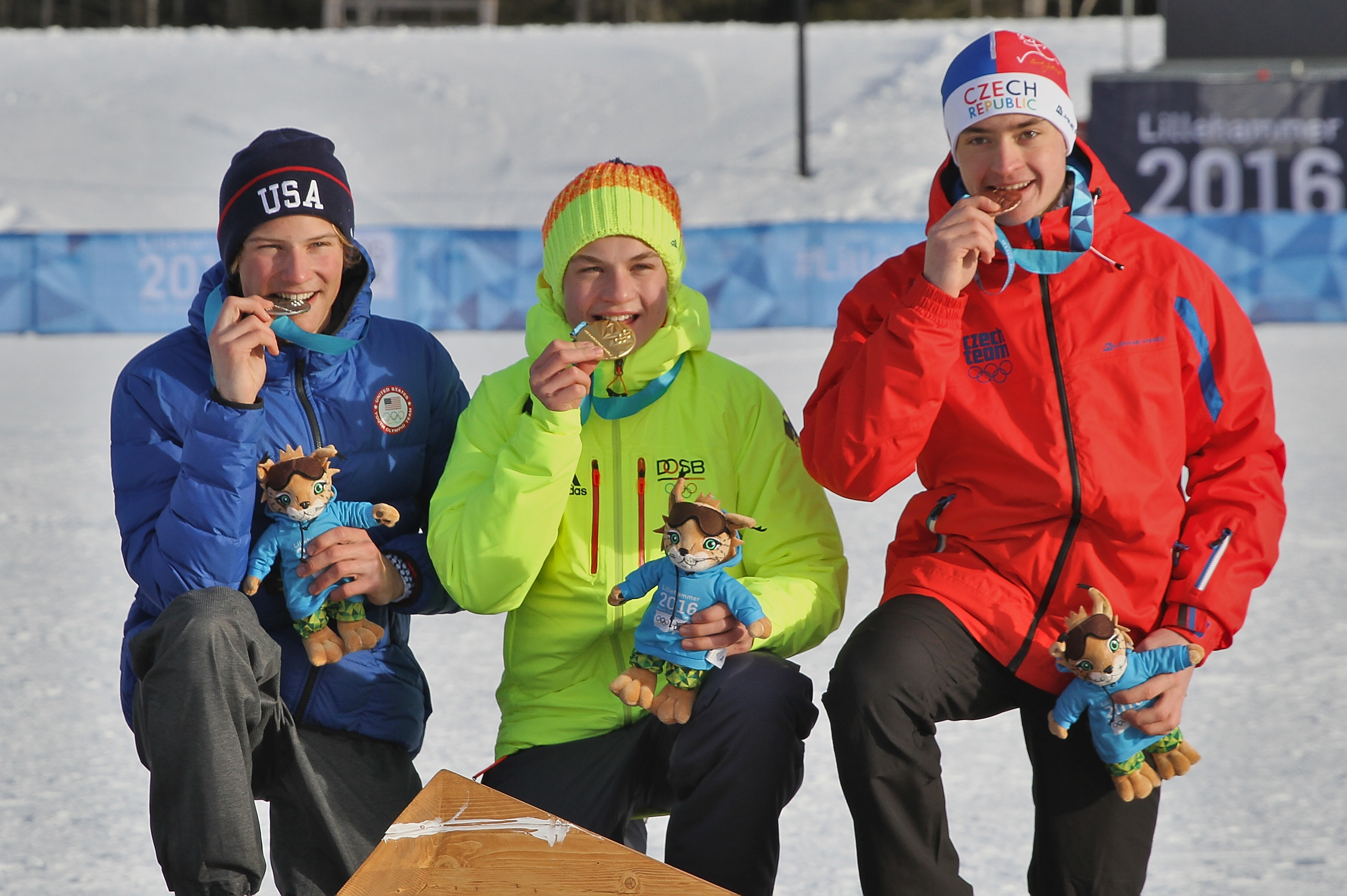
2016 podium

Games	Gold	Silver	Bronze
2012 Innsbruck	Tomáš Portyk; Czech Republic	Ilkka Herola; Finland	Go Yamamoto; Japan
2016 Lillehammer	Tim Kopp; Germany	Ben Loomis; United States	Ondřej Pažout; Czech Republic
2020 Lausanne	Stefan Rettenegger; Austria	Perttu Reponen; Finland	Sebastian Østvold; Norway
2024 Gangwon	Andreas Gfrerer; Austria	Manuel Senoner; Italy	Jonathan Gräbert; Germany

=== Girls' individual ===
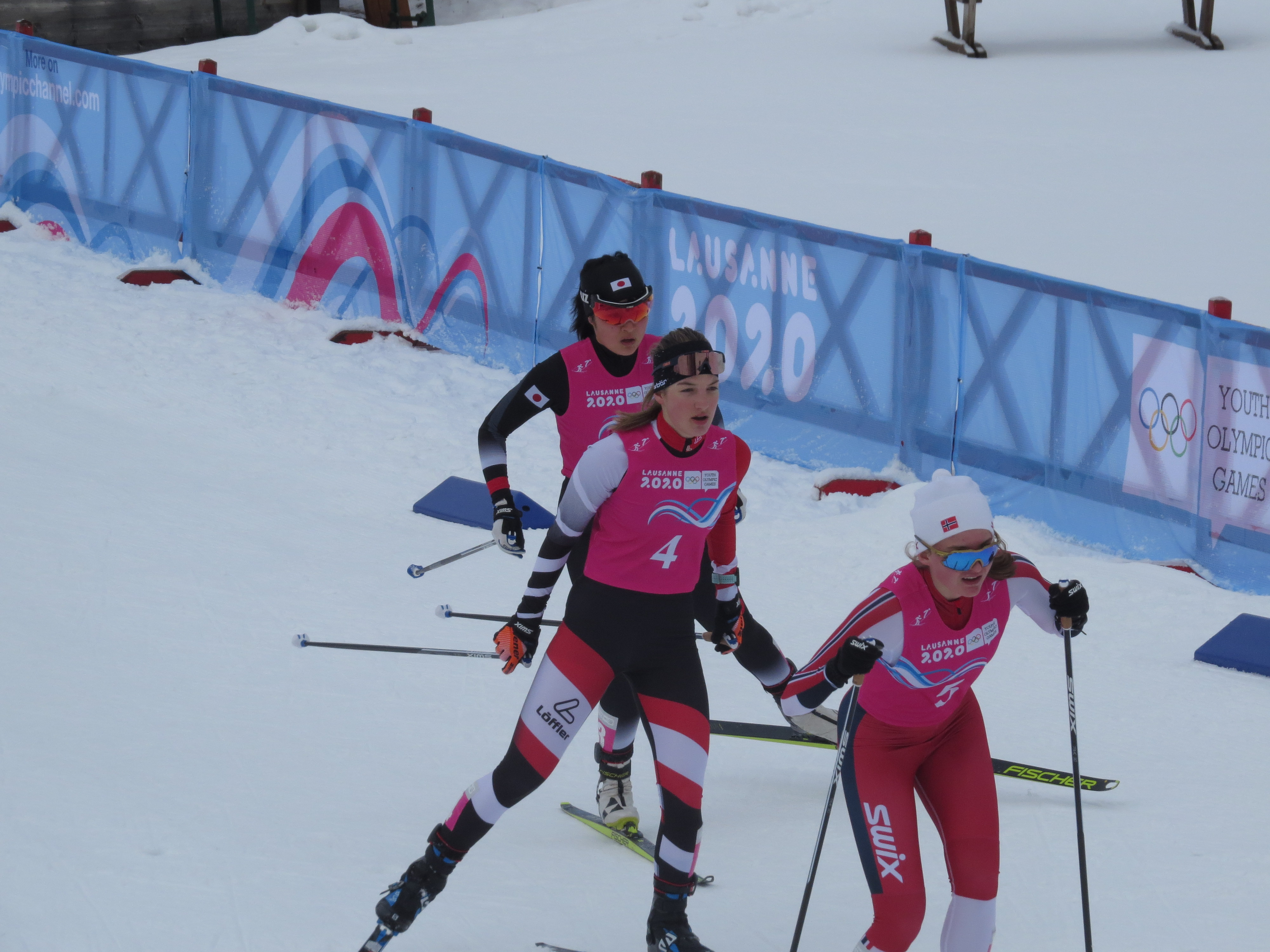
Gyda Westvold Hansen, Lisa Hirner and Ayane Miyazaki competing at the 2020 WYOG

Games	Gold	Silver	Bronze
2020 Lausanne	Lisa Hirner; Austria	Ayane Miyazaki; Japan	Jenny Nowak; Germany
2024 Gangwon	Minja Korhonen; Finland	Teja Pavec; Slovenia	Tia Malovrh; Slovenia

=== Mixed team ===
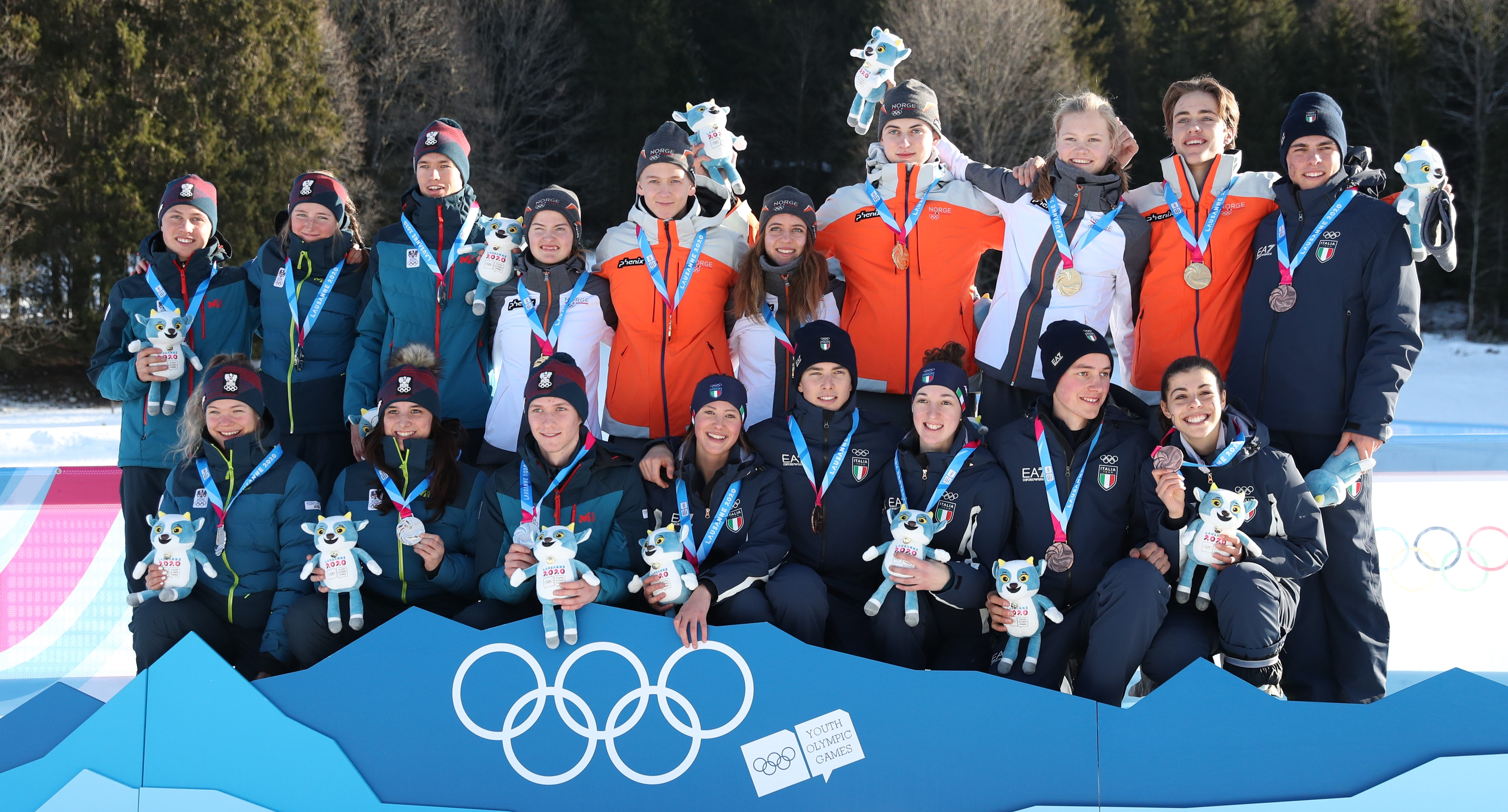
2020 podium

Games	Gold	Silver	Bronze
2016 Lillehammer	Russia; Sofia Tikhonova; Vitalii Ivanov; Maksim Sergeev; Maya Yakunina; Igor Fedotov	Norway; Anna Odine Strøm; Einar Lurås Oftebro; Marius Lindvik; Martine Engebretsen; Vebjoern Hegdal	Germany; Agnes Reisch; Tim Kopp; Jonathan Siegel; Anna-Maria Dietze; Philipp Unger
2020 Lausanne	Norway; Gyda Westvold Hansen; Sebastian Østvold; Nora Midtsundstad; Iver Olaussen; Maria Hartz Melling; Nikolai Holmboe	Austria; Johanna Bassani; Severin Reiter; Vanessa Moharitsch; David Haagen; Witta-Luisa Walcher; Erik Engel	Italy; Annika Sieff; Stefano Radovan; Jessica Malsiner; Mattia Galiani; Silvia Campione; Elia Barp
2024 Gangwon	Finland; Eemeli Kurttila; Heta Hirvonen; Minja Korhonen; Peter Räisänen	Slovenia; Aljaž Janhar; Tia Malovrh; Teja Pavec; Lovro Percl Seručnik	Italy; Bryan Venturini; Giada Delugan; Anna Senoner; Manuel Senoner

== Medal table ==
As of the 2024 Winter Youth Olympics.

Rank	Nation	Gold	Silver	Bronze	Total
1	Austria	3	1	0	4
2	Finland	2	2	0	4
3	Norway	1	1	1	3
4	Germany	1	0	3	4
5	Czech Republic	1	0	1	2
6	Russia	1	0	0	1
7	Slovenia	0	2	1	3
8	Italy	0	1	2	3
9	Japan	0	1	1	2
10	United States	0	1	0	1
Totals (10 entries)		9	9	9	27

== Participating nations ==
• = Did not compete in the sport, × = the country did not participate in the Games

Event	12	16	20	24	Years
Austria	1	1	4	4	4
Belarus	1	•	•	×	1
Canada	1	•	•	•	1
Czech Republic	1	1	4	4	4
Estonia	1	1	3	2	4
Finland	1	1	3	4	4
France	1	1	4	4	4
Germany	1	1	4	4	4
Great Britain	•	•	1	•	1
Italy	1	1	4	4	4
Japan	1	1	4	4	4
Kazakhstan	•	1	1	1	3
Norway	1	1	4	4	4
Poland	1	1	2	2	4
Russia	1	1	4	×	3
Slovakia	•	•	•	2	1
Slovenia	1	1	4	4	4
Switzerland	1	•	1	3	3
Ukraine	1	1	2	2	4
United States	1	1	4	4	4
Total athletes	17	15	53	52	
Total countries	17	15	17	15	

== See also ==
- Nordic combined at the Winter Olympics
