= Nordic combined at the 2020 Winter Youth Olympics – Girls' individual normal hill/4 km =

Girls' individual normal hill/4 km at the III Winter Youth Olympic Games
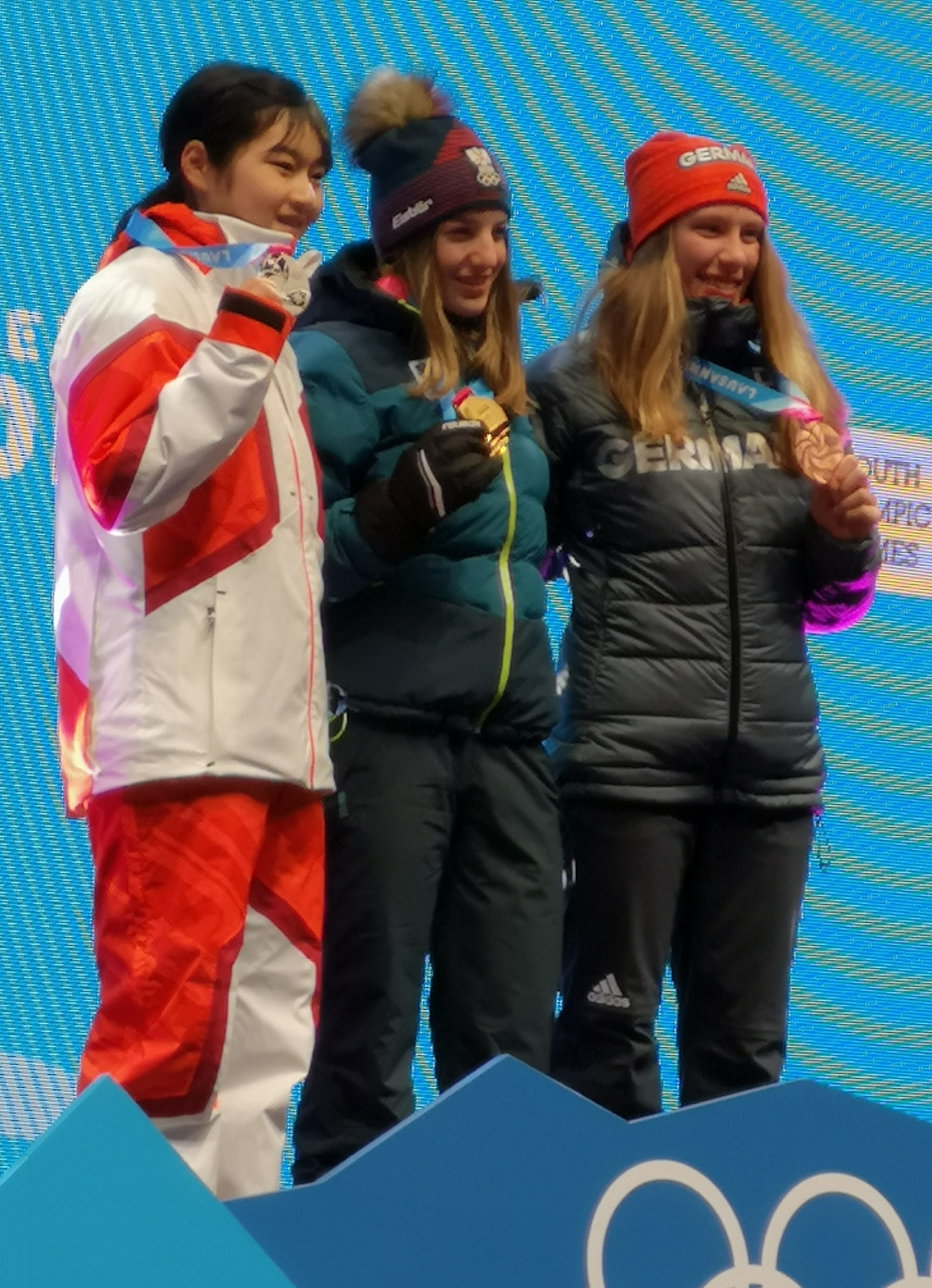
- Venue: Les Tuffes Nordic Centre
- Dates: 18 January
- Competitors: 23 from 13 nations
- Winning time: 11:45.6

Medalists
1st place, gold medalist(s)		Lisa Hirner	Austria
2nd place, silver medalist(s)		Ayane Miyazaki	Japan
3rd place, bronze medalist(s)		Jenny Nowak	Germany

The girls' individual normal hill/4 km Nordic combined competition at the 2020 Winter Youth Olympics was held on 18 January at the Les Tuffes Nordic Centre, France.

== Results ==
=== Ski jumping ===
The ski jumping part was held at 10:00.

Rank	Bib	Name	Country	Distance (m)	Points	Time difference
1	3	Thea Minyan Bjørseth	Norway	87.0	126.6	
2	12	Jenny Nowak	Germany	84.0	123.4	+0:10
3	18	Ayane Miyazaki	Japan	84.0	120.0	+0:20
4	20	Lisa Hirner	Austria	86.0	118.9	+0:23
5	11	Gyda Westvold Hansen	Norway	84.0	117.2	+0:28
6	22	Annika Sieff	Italy	80.0	112.6	+0:42
7	8	Johanna Bassani	Austria	79.5	110.3	+0:49
8	9	Silva Verbič	Slovenia	79.0	110.1	+0:50
9	4	Emilia Görlich	Germany	77.5	107.6	+0:57
10	7	Haruka Kasai	Japan	76.0	104.7	+1:06
11	6	Daniela Dejori	Italy	74.0	101.6	+1:15
12	15	Emma Treand	France	72.0	94.1	+1:38
13	21	Ema Volavšek	Slovenia	73.0	93.9	+1:38
14	10	Alexa Brabec	United States	69.5	88.8	+1:53
15	17	Tess Arnone	United States	71.0	86.7	+2:00
16	23	Mani Cooper	Great Britain	69.0	85.3	+2:04
17	19	Aleksandra Tikhonovich	Russia	70.0	83.5	+2:09
18	14	Tereza Koldovská	Czech Republic	68.0	81.7	+2:15
19	16	Annamaija Oinas	Finland	65.5	76.9	+2:29
20	13	Triinu Hausenberg	Estonia	65.0	74.7	+2:36
21	2	Diana Fedorova	Russia	63.5	73.4	+2:40
22	5	Maëla Didier	France	58.5	63.6	+3:09
23	1	Jolana Hradilová	Czech Republic	57.0	61.2	+3:16

=== Cross-country ===
The cross-country part was held at 14:00.

Rank	Bib	Name	Country	Start time	Cross-country time	Cross-country rank	Finish time	Deficit
1st place, gold medalist(s)	4	Lisa Hirner	Austria	0:23	11:22.6	2	11:45.6	
2nd place, silver medalist(s)	3	Ayane Miyazaki	Japan	0:20	11:28.8	3	11:48.8	+3.2
3rd place, bronze medalist(s)	2	Jenny Nowak	Germany	0:10	11:40.3	7	11:50.3	+4.7
4	5	Gyda Westvold Hansen	Norway	0:28	11:35.3	5	12:03.3	+17.7
5	9	Emilia Görlich	Germany	0:57	11:16.1	1	12:13.1	+27.5
6	6	Annika Sieff	Italy	0:42	11:37.3	6	12:19.3	+33.7
7	1	Thea Minyan Bjørseth	Norway	0:00	12:21.8	14	12:21.8	+36.2
8	7	Johanna Bassani	Austria	0:49	11:33.6	4	12:22.6	+37.0
9	10	Haruka Kasai	Japan	1:06	12:02.2	10	13:08.2	+1:22.6
10	11	Daniela Dejori	Italy	1:15	11:56.6	8	13:11.6	+1:26.0
11	13	Ema Volavšek	Slovenia	1:38	12:00.0	9	13:38.0	+1:52.4
12	8	Silva Verbič	Slovenia	0:50	12:50.2	20	13:40.2	+1:54.6
13	12	Emma Treand	France	1:38	12:35.1	19	14:13.1	+2:27.5
14	15	Tess Arnone	United States	2:00	12:18.0	12	14:18.0	+2:32.4
15	14	Alexa Brabec	United States	1:53	12:25.4	15	14:18.4	+2:32.8
16	17	Aleksandra Tikhonovich	Russia	2:09	12:31.8	17	14:40.8	+2:55.2
17	21	Diana Fedorova	Russia	2:40	12:07.2	11	14:47.2	+3:01.6
18	19	Annamaija Oinas	Finland	2:29	12:20.9	13	14:49.9	+3:04.3
19	16	Mani Cooper	Great Britain	2:04	13:02.8	21	15:06.8	+3:21.2
20	20	Triinu Hausenberg	Estonia	2:36	12:32.5	18	15:08.5	+3:22.9
21	22	Maëla Didier	France	3:09	12:28.6	16	15:37.6	+3:52.0
22	18	Tereza Koldovská	Czech Republic	2:15	13:33.5	23	15:48.5	+4:02.9
23	23	Jolana Hradilová	Czech Republic	3:16	13:13.6	22	16:29.6	+4:44.0
