= Austria at the 2020 Winter Youth Olympics =

- IOC code: AUT
- NOC: Austrian Olympic Committee
- Website: www.olympia.at

in Lausanne
- Competitors: 63 in 13 sports
- Medals Ranked 5th: Gold 6 Silver 2 Bronze 5 Total 13

Winter Youth Olympics appearances (overview)
- 2012; 2016; 2020; 2024

Austria competed at the 2020 Winter Youth Olympics in Lausanne, Switzerland from 9 to 22 January 2020.

== Medalists ==
Medal	Name	Sport	Event	Date
Gold	Amanda Salzgeber	Alpine skiing	Girls' combined	11 January
Gold	Philip Hoffmann	Alpine skiing	Boys' giant slalom	13 January
Gold	Ignaz Gschwentner	Speed skating	Mixed team sprint	15 January
Gold	Magdalena Luggin	Ice hockey	Girls' 3x3 mixed tournament	15 January
Gold	Lisa Hirner	Nordic combined	Girls' normal hill individual/4 km	18 January
Gold	Stefan Rettenegger	Nordic combined	Boys' normal hill individual/6 km	18 January
Gold	Marco Wörgötter	Ski jumping	Boys' normal hill individual	19 January
Gold	Lisa Hirner; Stefan Rettenegger; Julia Mühlbacher; Marco Wörgötter	Ski jumping	Mixed team normal hill	20 January
Silver	Lukas Haslinger	Biathlon	Boys' individual	11 January
Silver	Johanna Bassani; Severin Reiter; Vanessa Moharitsch; David Haagen; Witta-Luisa Walcher; Erik Engel	Nordic combined	Mixed team normal hill/4×3.3 km	22 January
Bronze	Nils Oberauer	Ski mountaineering	Boys' individual	10 January
Bronze	Amanda Salzgeber	Alpine skiing	Girls' giant slalom	12 January
Bronze	Anna Andexer	Biathlon	Girls' sprint	14 January
Bronze	Amanda Salzgeber; Philip Hoffmann	Alpine skiing	Parallel mixed team	15 January
Bronze	Karolina Hengelmüller	Ice hockey	Girls' 3x3 mixed tournament	15 January
Bronze	David Haagen	Ski jumping	Boys' normal hill	19 January

== Alpine skiing ==
Boys

Athlete	Event	Run 1		Run 2		Total	
Athlete	Event	Time	Rank	Time	Rank	Time	Rank
Philip Hoffmann	Super-G	—				55.35	10
Philip Hoffmann	Combined	55.35	10	33.40	3	1:28.75	4
Philip Hoffmann	Giant slalom	1:02.50	1	1:03.81	1	2:06.31	1st place, gold medalist(s)
Philip Hoffmann	Slalom	37.22	3	DNF			
Valentin Lotter	Super-G	—				56.13	24
Valentin Lotter	Combined	56.13	24	DNF			
Valentin Lotter	Giant slalom	DNF					
Valentin Lotter	Slalom	DNF					
Vincent Wieser	Super-G	—				DSQ	
Vincent Wieser	Combined	DSQ					
Vincent Wieser	Giant slalom	1:04.26	4	1:05.09	9	2:09.35	8
Vincent Wieser	Slalom	DNF					

Girls

Athlete	Event	Run 1		Run 2		Total	
Athlete	Event	Time	Rank	Time	Rank	Time	Rank
Teresa Fritzenwallner	Super-G	—				57.11	9
Teresa Fritzenwallner	Combined	57.11	9	DNF			
Teresa Fritzenwallner	Giant slalom	1:06.95	16	DNF			
Teresa Fritzenwallner	Slalom	46.86	13	44.49	3	1:31.35	8
Maria Niederndorfer	Super-G	—				56.97	7
Maria Niederndorfer	Combined	56.97	7	38.19	8	1:35.16	7
Maria Niederndorfer	Giant slalom	1:06.19	9	1:04.55	12	2:10.74	11
Maria Niederndorfer	Slalom	47.18	16	44.98	8	1:32.16	10
Amanda Salzgeber	Super-G	—				56.40	4
Amanda Salzgeber	Combined	56.40	4	37.34	2	1:33.74	1st place, gold medalist(s)
Amanda Salzgeber	Giant slalom	1:05.66	6	1:03.17	3	2:08.83	3rd place, bronze medalist(s)
Amanda Salzgeber	Slalom	45.62	4	DNF			

Mixed

Athlete	Event	Round of 16	Quarterfinals	Semifinals	Final / BM	
Athlete	Event	Opposition Result	Opposition Result	Opposition Result	Opposition Result	Rank
Amanda Salzgeber; Philipp Hoffmann	Team	Great Britain; W 4–0	Sweden; W 4–0	Germany; L 1–3	France; W 2*–2	3rd place, bronze medalist(s)

== Biathlon ==
Boys

Athlete	Event	Time	Misses	Rank
Lukas Haslinger	Sprint	22:33.0	5 (2+3)	50
Lukas Haslinger	Individual	34:23.0	2 (1+1+0+0)	2nd place, silver medalist(s)
Leon Kienesberger	Sprint	21:13.1	1 (0+1)	23
Leon Kienesberger	Individual	39:55.1	6 (1+2+0+3)	50
Jan Salzmann	Sprint	21:59.7	5 (2+3)	36
Jan Salzmann	Individual	38:44.2	5 (3+2+0+0)	33
Lukas Weissbacher	Sprint	20:51.8	3 (2+1)	20
Lukas Weissbacher	Individual	39:59.1	8 (2+3+1+2)	51

Girls

Athlete	Event	Time	Misses	Rank
Anna Andexer	Sprint	19:01.6	1 (0+1)	3rd place, bronze medalist(s)
Anna Andexer	Individual	36:34.2	6 (2+3+0+1)	19
Femke Kramer	Sprint	20:28.5	3 (1+2)	29
Femke Kramer	Individual	35:11.3	4 (1+1+0+2)	8
Victoria Mellitzer	Sprint	21:26.1	4 (3+1)	51
Victoria Mellitzer	Individual	39:13.0	8 (3+2+2+1)	50
Lara Wagner	Sprint	20:03.3	3 (1+2)	20
Lara Wagner	Individual	35:44.3	5 (1+3+1+0)	14

Mixed

Athletes	Event	Time	Misses	Rank
Lara Wagner; Lukas Haslinger	Single mixed relay	46:07.0	4+17	16
Anna Andexer; Lara Wagner; Lukas Haslinger; Lukas Weissbacher	Mixed relay	1:16:11.1	4+18	10

== Cross-country skiing ==
Boys

Athlete	Event	Qualification		Quarterfinal		Semifinal		Final	
Athlete	Event	Time	Rank	Time	Rank	Time	Rank	Time	Rank
Erik Engel	10 km classic	—						30:49.50	51
Erik Engel	Sprint freestyle	3:29.13	34	did not advance					
Erik Engel	Cross-country cross	4:49.44	53	did not advance					
Christian Steiner	10 km classic	—						31:41.40	58
Christian Steiner	Sprint freestyle	3:28.39	33	did not advance					
Christian Steiner	Cross-country cross	4:41.07	40	did not advance					
Christoph Wieland	10 km classic	—						32:43.10	65
Christoph Wieland	Sprint freestyle	3:32.15	43	did not advance					
Christoph Wieland	Cross-country cross	4:44.59	48	did not advance					

Girls

Athlete	Event	Qualification		Quarterfinal		Semifinal		Final	
Athlete	Event	Time	Rank	Time	Rank	Time	Rank	Time	Rank
Magdalena Engelhardt	5 km classic	—						16:15.30	32
Magdalena Engelhardt	Sprint freestyle	3:06.79	49	did not advance					
Magdalena Engelhardt	Cross-country cross	5:26.51	28 Q	—		5:18.46	9	did not advance	
Anna Maria Logonder	5 km classic	—						16:49.70	47
Anna Maria Logonder	Sprint freestyle	2:58.53	31	did not advance					
Anna Maria Logonder	Cross-country cross	5:37.40	42	did not advance					
Witta Luisa Walcher	5 km classic	—						15:53.80	29
Witta Luisa Walcher	Sprint freestyle	3:02.20	38	did not advance					
Witta Luisa Walcher	Cross-country cross	5:04.70	9 Q	—		5:01.82	5	did not advance	

== Freestyle skiing ==
Lisa Titscher also qualified for the Games, but she crashed during the Olympics training session in Reiteralm, and didn't travel with team.

Ski cross

Athlete	Event	Group heats		Semifinal	Final
Athlete	Event	Points	Rank	Position	Position
Christoph Danksagmüller	Boys' ski cross	16	9	did not advance	
Marcus Plank	Boys' ski cross	20	1 Q	2 Q	4
Leonie Innerhofer	Girls' ski cross	15	13	did not advance	

Slopestyle & Big Air

Athlete	Event	Qualification				Final				
Athlete	Event	Run 1	Run 2	Best	Rank	Run 1	Run 2	Run 3	Best / Total	Rank
Daniel Bacher	Boys' big air	~~77.25~~	77.50	77.50	9 Q	79.25	77.00	~~14.75~~	156.25	6
Daniel Bacher	Boys' slopestyle	77.33	~~34.00~~	77.33	5 Q	40.66	79.33	69.00	79.33	7

== Ice hockey ==
=== 3x3 ===
Team	Event	Group Stage								Semifinal	Final / BM	
Team	Event	Opposition Score	Opposition Score	Opposition Score	Opposition Score	Opposition Score	Opposition Score	Opposition Score	Rank	Opposition Score	Opposition Score	Rank
Team Black; Lukas Floriantschitz (AUT); Ruben Esposito (ARG); Kerem Alsan (TUR); Yaroslav Labutkin (RUS); Yu Jiacong (CHN); Corné van Stuijvenberg (NED); Wataru Suzuki (JPN); Adam Sýkora (SVK); Dominik Pavlata (CZE); Linas Dėdinas (LTU); Danil Karpovich (BLR); Kalle Varis (FIN); Matthias Rindone (ITA)	Boys' 3x3	Team Brown; L 11–13 (5–6, 2–3, 4–4)	Team Red; L 9–12 (3–4, 4–3, 2–5)	Team Blue; W 14–8 (7–4, 5–2, 2–2)	Team Yellow; W 19–7 (7–2, 6–2, 6–3)	Team Orange; L 8–14 (4–3, 3–4, 1–7)	Team Grey; W 16–8 (2–4, 10–1, 4–3)	Team Green; W 6–4 (2–2, 2–1, 2–1)	4	Team Green; L 3–7 (2–0, 0–2, 1–5)	Team Brown; L 5–6 (2–1, 1–3, 2–2)	4
Team Orange; Jonas Dobnig (AUT); Matthew Hamnett (SIN); Jakub Michalski (POL); Diego Rodriguez (MEX); Tomoyoshi Yuki (JPN); Nicolò Remolato (ITA); Jack Lewis (NZL); Kim Sang-yeob (KOR); Roman Kechter (GER); Márk Weidemann (HUN); Leni Michellod (SUI); Ivan Novozhilov (RUS); Yan Shostak (BLR)	Boys' 3x3	Team Red; W 8–6 (1–3, 1–1, 6–2)	Team Blue; W 12–1 (5–1, 2–0, 5–0)	Team Yellow; L 4–9 (1–2, 1–5, 2–2)	Team Brown; L 10–14 (0–6, 4–5, 6–3)	Team Black; W 14–8 (3–4, 4–3, 7–1)	Team Green; L 6–8 (1–1, 1–1, 4–6)	Team Grey; L 2–5 (2–3, 0–0, 0–2)	6	did not advance		
Team Grey; Jan Billa (AUT); Thawab Al-Subaey (QAT); Alejandro Resendiz (MEX); Nowruz Baýhanow (TKM); Gosei Daikuhara (JPN); Timofei Katkov (RUS); Pablo Mata (ESP); Sohn Hyun (KOR); Patrik Melicher (SVK); Nino Tomov (BUL); Boldizsár Szalay (HUN); Lukas Svedin (SWE); Alexei Baidek (KAZ)	Boys' 3x3	Team Blue; W 9–8 (2–1, 5–3, 2–4)	Team Yellow; W 11–8 (6–1, 2–5, 3–2)	Team Brown; L 6–16 (3–4, 2–4, 1–8)	Team Red; W 13–9 (4–2, 3–5, 6–2)	Team Green; L 6–14 (2–3, 1–4, 3–7)	Team Black; L 8–16 (4–2, 1–10, 3–4)	Team Orange; W 5–2 (3–2, 0–0, 2–0)	5	did not advance		
Team Yellow; Lukas Heuberger (AUT); Tibo Van Reeth (BEL); Csongor Antal (ROU); Yassin Soubra (FRA); Tommaso Madaschi (ITA); David Guilabert (ESP); Ryan Kolgen (NED); Miha Beričič (SLO); Andrei Murashko (BLR); Oskar Bakkevig (NOR); Šimon Slavíček (CZE); Daniel Valencia (MEX); Loris Uberti (SUI)	Boys' 3x3	Team Green; L 5–10 (0–2, 2–1, 3–7)	Team Grey; L 8–11 (1–6, 5–2, 2–3)	Team Orange; W 9–4 (2–1, 5–1, 2–2)	Team Black; L 7–19 (2–7, 2–6, 3–6)	Team Blue; W 13–8 (3–2, 4–2, 6–4)	Team Red; L 13–15 (3–5, 6–4, 4–6)	Team Brown; L 6–8 (1–2, 0–2, 5–4)	7	did not advance		
Team Blue; Karolina Hengelmüller (AUT); Sidre Özer (TUR); Valerie Christmann (SUI); Anna Kot (POL); Maria Runevska (BUL); Mirren Foy (GBR); Zuzana Dobiašová (SVK); Yana Krasheninina (RUS); Maya Stober (GER); Regina Metzler (HUN); Nikki Sharp (AUS); Yuna Kusama (JPN); Aya Juhl Petersen (DEN)	Girls' 3x3	Team Grey; W 9–7 (1–3, 5–2, 3–2)	Team Orange; W 7–4 (4–2, 2–1, 1–1)	Team Black; W 8–4 (3–1, 3–2, 2–1)	Team Green; W 5–3 (2–0, 1–0, 2–3)	Team Yellow; L 5–8 (0–5, 4–2, 1–1)	Team Brown; W 5–4 GWS (0–2, 0–1, 4–1) (SO:1–0)	Team Red; L 4–5 GLS (1–1, 0–0, 3–3) (SO:0–1)	2	Team Yellow; L 5–7 (0–2, 2–3, 3–2)	Team Brown; W 6–4 (4–0, 2–1, 0–3)	3rd place, bronze medalist(s)

Girls

- Emma Hofbauer
- Marja Linzbichler
- Magdalena Luggin
- Lisa Schröfl

== Luge ==
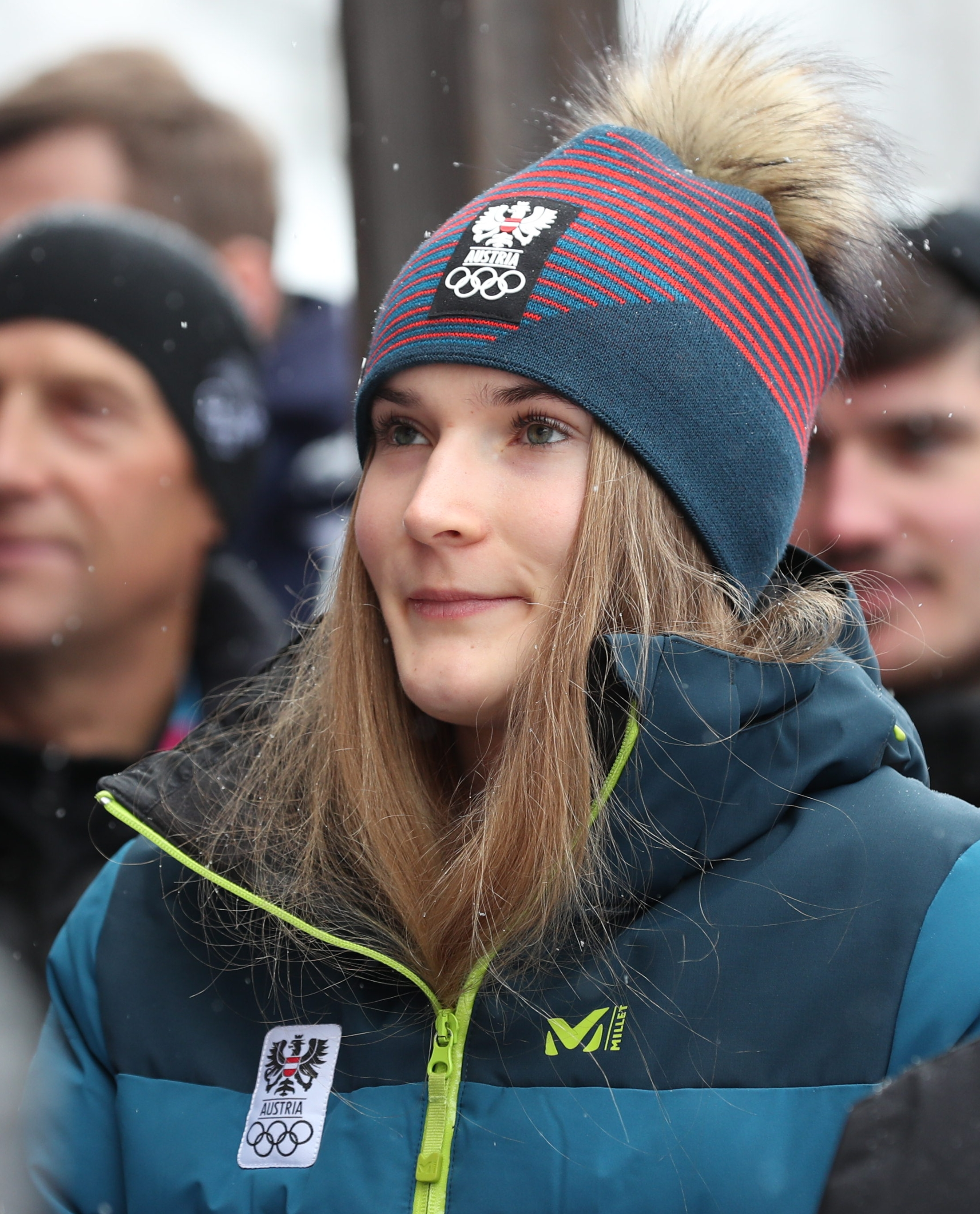
Luger Selina Egle could not compete because of an injury during the training.

Boys

Athlete	Event	Run 1		Run 2		Total	
Athlete	Event	Time	Rank	Time	Rank	Time	Rank
Noah Kallan	Singles	54.736	8	54.910	8	1:49.646	8
Florian Tanzer	Singles	54.593	6	54.957	10	1:49.550	7

Girls

Athlete	Event	Run 1		Run 2		Total	
Athlete	Event	Time	Rank	Time	Rank	Time	Rank
Barbara Allmaier	Singles	55.657	9	55.296	8	1:50.953	8
Madlen Loß	Singles	55.830	12	55.814	14	1:51.644	13
~~Selina Egle~~; ~~Lara Kipp~~	Doubles	DNS					

The first nominated Selina Egle broke a foot during the training. Re-nominated is Madlen Loß for the single event, an Austrian double will not start.

== Nordic combined ==
Individual

Athlete	Event	Ski jumping				Cross-country	
Athlete	Event	Distance	Points	Rank	Deficit	Time	Rank
Severin Reiter	Normal hill/6 km	84.5	109.1	10	0:46	15:59.5	9
Stefan Rettenegger	Normal hill/6 km	90.0	120.6	1		14:45.8	1st place, gold medalist(s)
Johanna Bassani	Normal hill/4 km	79.5	110.3	7	0:49	12:22.6	8
Lisa Hirner	Normal hill/4 km	86.0	118.9	4	0:23	11:45.6	1st place, gold medalist(s)

Nordic mixed team

Athlete	Event	Ski jumping			Cross-country	
Athlete	Event	Points	Rank	Deficit	Time	Rank
Johanna Bassani; Severin Reiter; Vanessa Moharitsch; David Haagen; Witta-Luisa Walcher; Erik Engel	Nordic mixed team	476.5	2	0:12	30:39.8	2nd place, silver medalist(s)

== Short track speed skating ==
One Austrian skater achieved quota place for Austria based on the results of the 2019 World Junior Short Track Speed Skating Championships.

Boys

Athlete	Event	Heats		Quarterfinal		Semifinal		Final	
Athlete	Event	Time	Rank	Time	Rank	Time	Rank	Time	Rank
Tobias Wolf	500 m	45.338	4	did not advance					
Tobias Wolf	1000 m	1:34.496	4	did not advance					

== Skeleton ==
Athlete	Event	Run 1		Run 2		Total	
Athlete	Event	Time	Rank	Time	Rank	Time	Rank
Christian Jünemann	Boys'	1:10.75	10	1:10.81	10	2:21.56	11
Sandro Mai	Boys'	1:10.41	7	1:09.45	3	2:19.86	4
Victoria Steiner	Girls'	1:11.99	4	1:11.75	6	2:23.74	5
Annia Unterscheider	Girls'	1:12.17	6	1:12.27	9	2:24.44	9

== Ski jumping ==
Boys

Athlete	Event	First round			Final			Total	
Athlete	Event	Distance	Points	Rank	Distance	Points	Rank	Points	Rank
David Haagen	Normal hill	88.0	123.0	2	86.0	121.5	3	244.5	3rd place, bronze medalist(s)
Marco Wörgötter	Normal hill	91.5	130.9	1	90.0	126.8	1	257.7	1st place, gold medalist(s)

Girls

Athlete	Event	First round			Final			Total	
Athlete	Event	Distance	Points	Rank	Distance	Points	Rank	Points	Rank
Vanessa Moharitsch	Normal hill	76.0	93.8	17	73.0	83.6	12	177.4	14
Julia Mühlbacher	Normal hill	81.5	113.0	3	74.5	92.9	5	205.9	4

Team

Athlete	Event	First round		Final round		Total	
Athlete	Event	Points	Rank	Points	Rank	Points	Rank
Lisa Hirner; Stefan Rettenegger; Julia Mühlbacher; Marco Wörgötter	Mixed team	499.9	1	486.5	1	986.4	1st place, gold medalist(s)

== Ski mountaineering ==
Boys

Athlete	Event	Time	Rank
Nils Oberauer	Individual	49:25.65	3rd place, bronze medalist(s)
Julian Tritscher	Individual	51:03.61	7

Girls

Athlete	Event	Time	Rank
Lisa Rettensteiner	Individual	1:06:39.71	11

Sprint

Athlete	Event	Qualification		Quarterfinal		Semifinal		Final	
Athlete	Event	Time	Rank	Time	Rank	Time	Rank	Time	Rank
Nils Oberauer	Boys' sprint	2:55.50	7	3:04.95	4	did not advance			
Julian Tritscher	Boys' sprint	2:53.76	5	2:45.85	2 Q	2:39.20	2 Q	2:44.57	4
Lena Leitner Hölzl	Girls' sprint	4:15.51	20	4:08.15	5	did not advance			
Lisa Rettensteiner	Girls' sprint	3:34.50	1	3:56.25	4	did not advance			

Mixed

Athlete	Event	Time	Rank
Lisa Rettensteiner; Nils Oberauer; Lena Leitner Hölzl; Julian Tritscher	Mixed relay	40:35	8

== Snowboarding ==
Snowboard cross

Athlete	Event	Group heats		Semifinal	Final
Athlete	Event	Points	Rank	Position	Position
Elias Leitner	Boys' snowboard cross	11	21	did not advance	
Felix Powondra	Boys' snowboard cross	12	19	did not advance	
Anna-Maria Galler	Girls' snowboard cross	18	5 Q	8 QB	6
Tanja Kobald	Girls' snowboard cross	6	25	did not advance	

Halfpipe, Slopestyle, & Big Air

Athlete	Event	Qualification				Final				
Athlete	Event	Run 1	Run 2	Best	Rank	Run 1	Run 2	Run 3	Best	Rank
Lukas Frischhut	Boys' big air	69.50	~~15.50~~	69.50	12 Q	~~16.25~~	~~14.00~~	41.00	41.00	10
Lukas Frischhut	Boys' slopestyle	4.66	~~4.00~~	4.66	22	did not advance				
Kiara Zung	Girls' big air	15.66	~~13.33~~	15.66	19	did not advance				
Kiara Zung	Girls' slopestyle	~~17.00~~	19.50	19.50	16	did not advance				

Snowboard and ski cross relay

Athlete	Event	Pre-heat	Quarterfinal	Semifinal	Final
Athlete	Event	Position	Position	Position	Position
Anna-Maria Galler; Leonie Innerhofer; Felix Powondra; Marcus Plank	Team ski-snowboard cross	Bye	1 Q	3 QB	7
Mixed Team 10; Tanja Kobald (AUT); Vladislava Baliukina (RUS); Elias Leitner (AUT); Christoph Danksagmüller (AUT)	Team ski-snowboard cross	3	did not advance		

== Speed skating ==
One Austrian skater achieved quota place for Austria based on the results of the 2019 World Junior Speed Skating Championships.

Boys

Athlete	Event	Time	Rank
Ignaz Gschwentner	500 m	37.58	6
Ignaz Gschwentner	1500 m	2:02.15	19

Mass Start

Athlete	Event	Semifinal			Final		
Athlete	Event	Points	Time	Rank	Points	Time	Rank
Ignaz Gschwentner	Boys' mass start	3	6:57.28	6 Q	2	6:30.89	7

Mixed

Athlete	Event	Time	Rank
Team 3 Sini Siro (FIN); Yukino Yoshida (JPN); Ignaz Gschwentner (AUT); Alexander Sergeev (RUS)	Mixed team sprint	2:04.10	1st place, gold medalist(s)

== See also ==
- Austria at the Youth Olympics
- Austria at the 2020 Summer Olympics
