= Luge at the 2020 Winter Youth Olympics – Boys' singles =

Boys' singles at the III Winter Youth Olympic Games
- Venue: St. Moritz-Celerina Olympic Bobrun
- Dates: 18 January
- Competitors: 27 from 18 nations
- Winning time: 1:48.045

Medalists
1st place, gold medalist(s)		Gints Bērziņš	Latvia
2nd place, silver medalist(s)		Pavel Repilov	Russia
3rd place, bronze medalist(s)		Timon Grancagnolo	Germany

The boys' singles luge at the 2020 Winter Youth Olympics took place on 18 January at the St. Moritz-Celerina Olympic Bobrun.

== Results ==
The first run was held at 08:30 and the second run at 09:45.

Rank	Bib	Athlete	Country	Run 1	Rank 1	Run 2	Rank 2	Total	Behind
1st place, gold medalist(s)	14	Gints Bērziņš	Latvia	54.036	1	54.009	1	1:48.045	
2nd place, silver medalist(s)	5	Pavel Repilov	Russia	54.175	2	54.054	2	1:48.229	+0.184
3rd place, bronze medalist(s)	12	Timon Grancagnolo	Germany	54.433	3	54.403	3	1:48.836	+0.791
4	7	Pascal Kunze	Germany	54.519	5	54.442	4	1:48.961	+0.916
5	16	Alex Gufler	Italy	54.506	4	54.543	5	1:49.049	+1.004
6	11	Kaspars Rinks	Latvia	54.693	7	54.789	6	1:49.482	+1.437
7	9	Florian Tanzer	Austria	54.593	6	54.957	10	1:49.550	+1.505
8	10	Noah Kallan	Austria	54.736	8	54.910	8	1:49.646	+1.601
9	2	Matthew Greiner	United States	54.897	9	54.833	7	1:49.730	+1.685
10	8	Sergei Bondarev	Russia	54.992	10	54.935	9	1:49.927	+1.882
11	3	Lasha Mtchedliani	Georgia	55.365	14	55.126	11	1:50.491	+2.446
12	27	Marcin Kiełbasa	Poland	55.301	12	55.276	12	1:50.577	+2.532
13	13	Oleh-Roman Pylypiv	Ukraine	55.446	15	55.293	13	1:50.739	+2.694
14	20	Bao Zhenyu	China	55.239	11	55.666	14	1:50.905	+2.860
15	24	Hunter Harris	United States	55.725	18	55.880	16	1:51.605	+3.560
16	6	Dávid Lihoň	Slovakia	55.462	16	56.446	21	1:51.908	+3.863
17	28	Darius Şerban	Romania	55.345	13	56.652	24	1:51.997	+3.952
18	21	Hunter Burke	New Zealand	56.285	21	55.744	15	1:52.029	+3.984
19	15	Vratislav Varga	Slovakia	55.983	19	56.149	17	1:52.132	+4.087
20	1	Luka Mtchedliani	Georgia	56.119	20	56.343	19	1:52.462	+4.417
21	23	Hamza Pleho	Bosnia and Herzegovina	56.334	22	56.303	18	1:52.637	+4.592
22	19	Jakub Vepřovský	Czech Republic	56.515	23	56.397	20	1:52.912	+4.867
23	4	Lukas Peccei	Italy	55.636	17	57.404	26	1:53.040	+4.995
24	22	Yeh Meng-jhe	Chinese Taipei	56.615	24	56.516	23	1:53.131	+5.086
25	26	Yang Shih-hsun	Chinese Taipei	57.319	26	56.497	22	1:53.816	+5.771
26	17	Milen Milanov	Bulgaria	57.018	25	57.509	27	1:54.527	+6.482
27	25	Marius Goncear	Moldova	57.783	27	56.860	25	1:54.643	+6.598
	18	Nedyalko Ivanov	Bulgaria	Did not start					
