= Alpine skiing at the 2020 Winter Youth Olympics – Parallel mixed team =

Parallel mixed team at the III Winter Youth Olympic Games
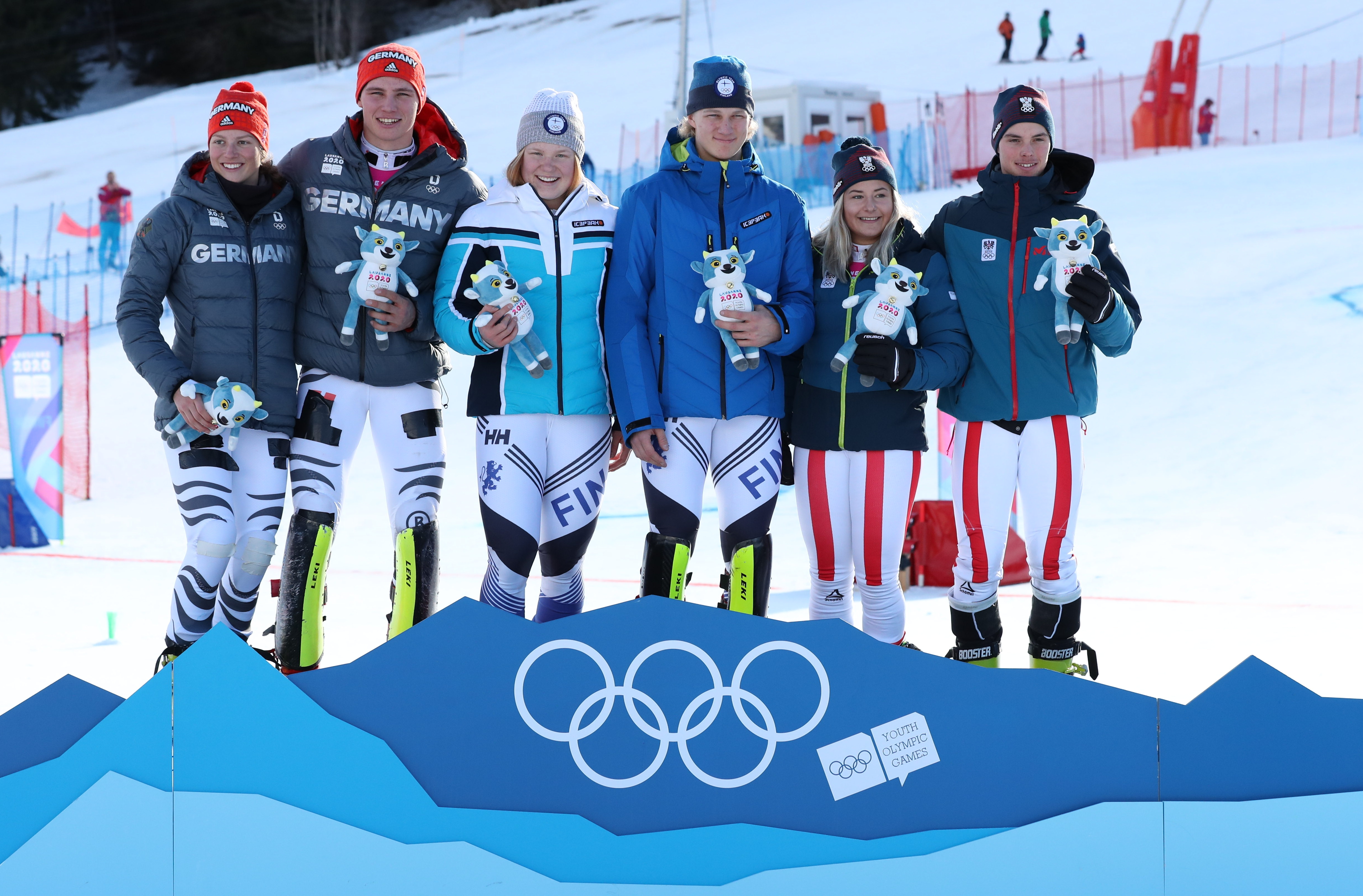
- Venue: Les Diablerets
- Date: 15 January
- Competitors: 32 from 16 nations

Medalists
1st place, gold medalist(s)		Rosa Pohjolainen; Jaakko Tapanainen	Finland
2nd place, silver medalist(s)		Lara Klein; Max Geissler-Hauber	Germany
3rd place, bronze medalist(s)		Amanda Salzgeber; Philip Hoffmann	Austria

The parallel mixed team competition of the 2020 Winter Youth Olympics was held at Les Diablerets on 15 January.

== Participants ==
Bib	Name	Country
11; 12	Amélie Klopfenstein; Luc Roduit	Switzerland
21; 22	Malin Sofie Sund; Mikkel Remsøy	Norway
31; 32	Nicola Rountree-Williams; Daniel Gillis	United States
41; 42	Amanda Salzgeber; Philip Hoffmann	Austria
51; 52	Hanna Aronsson Elfman; Adam Hofstedt	Sweden
61; 62	Caitlin McFarlane; Auguste Aulnette	France
71; 72	Sophie Mathiou; Marco Abbruzzese	Italy
81; 82	Anja Oplotnik; Rok Ažnoh	Slovenia
91; 92	Lara Klein; Max Geissler-Hauber	Germany
101; 102	Rosa Pohjolainen; Jaakko Tapanainen	Finland
111; 112	Sarah Brown; Louis Latulippe	Canada
121; 122	Zoe Michael; Thomas Hoffman	Australia
131; 132	Daisi Daniels; Robert Holmes	Great Britain
141; 142	Sofía Saint Antonin; Tiziano Gravier	Argentina
151; 152	Yuka Wakatsuki; Ohra Kimishima	Japan
161; 162	Anastasia Trofimova; Roman Zverian	Russia

== Bracket ==
Round of 16
Switzerland	3
Russia	1
Slovenia	1
Germany	3
Sweden	3
Australia	1
Austria	4
Great Britain	0
United States	3
Argentina	1
France	4
Canada	0
Italy	0
Finland	4
Norway	4
Japan	0

Quarterfinals
Switzerland	2
Germany	2*
Sweden	0
Austria	4
United States	2
France	2*
Finland	3
Norway	1

Semifinals
Germany	3
Austria	1
France	1
Finland	3

Final
Germany	0
Finland	4
Third place
Austria	2*
France	2

== External list ==
- Bracket
