= Nordic combined at the 2020 Winter Youth Olympics – Boys' individual normal hill/6 km =

Boys' individual normal hill/6 km at the III Winter Youth Olympic Games
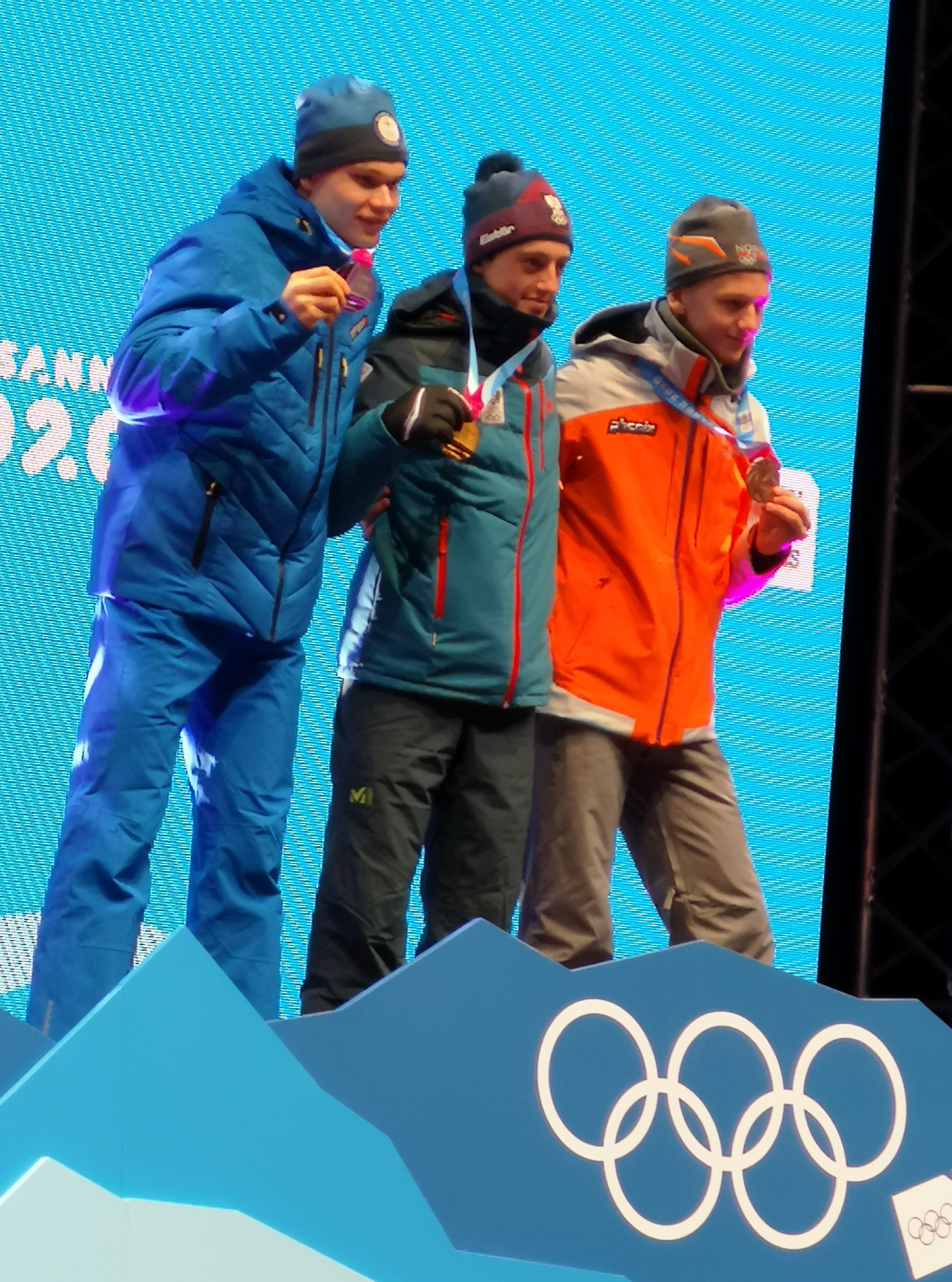
- Venue: Les Tuffes Nordic Centre
- Dates: 18 January
- Competitors: 29 from 16 nations
- Winning time: 14:45.8

Medalists
1st place, gold medalist(s)		Stefan Rettenegger	Austria
2nd place, silver medalist(s)		Perttu Reponen	Finland
3rd place, bronze medalist(s)		Sebastian Østvold	Norway

The boys' individual normal hill/6 km Nordic combined competition at the 2020 Winter Youth Olympics was held on 18 January at the Les Tuffes Nordic Centre, France.

== Results ==
=== Ski jumping ===
The ski jumping part was held at 11:30.

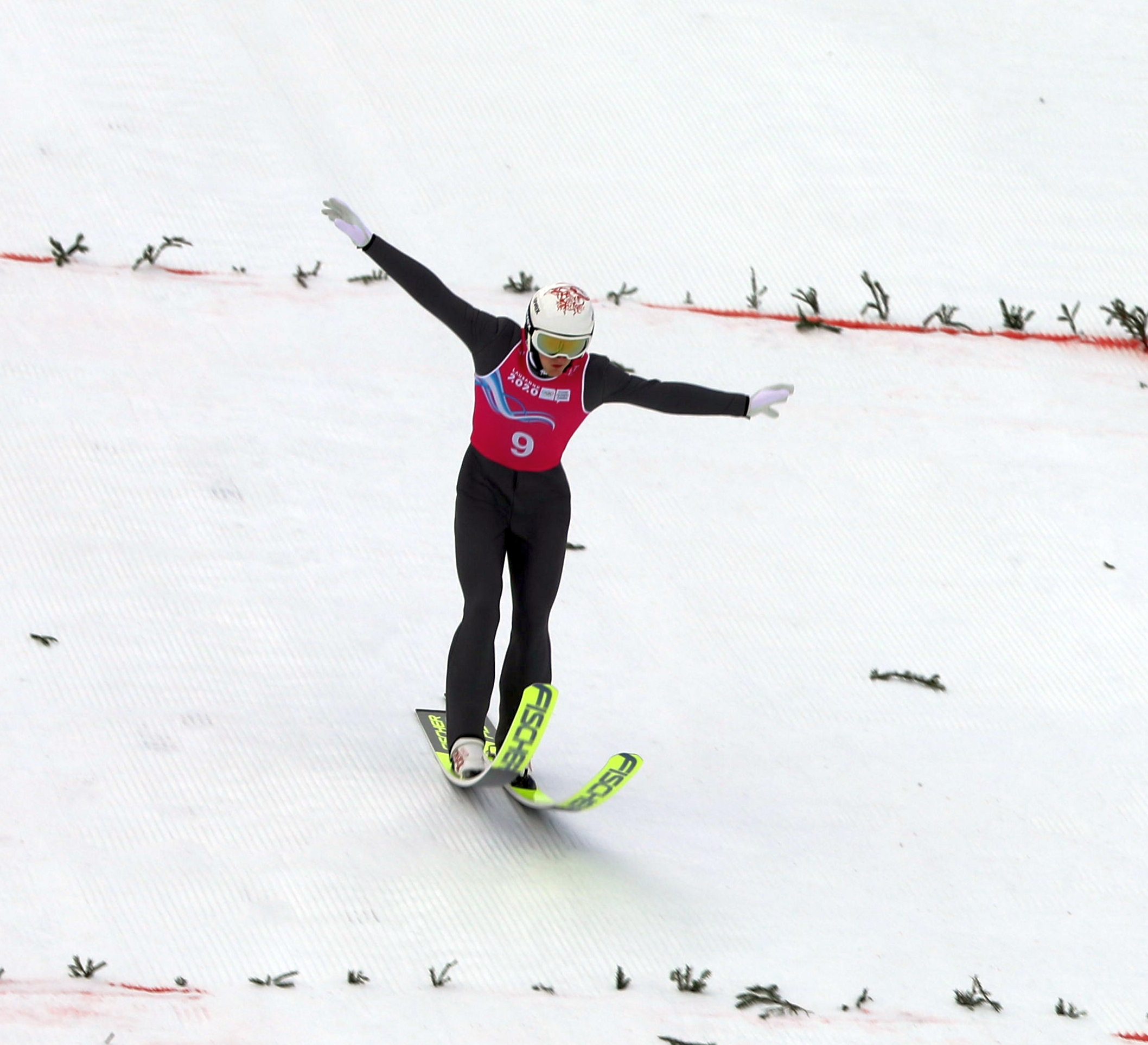
Jan Andersen from Germany while landing his jump

Rank	Bib	Name	Country	Distance (m)	Points	Time difference
1	26	Stefan Rettenegger	Austria	90.0	120.6	
2	15	Sebastian Østvold	Norway	89.5	118.5	+0:08
3	20	Niklas Malacinski	United States	85.5	116.9	+0:15
4	9	Jan Andersen	Germany	89.0	116.7	+0:16
5	22	Mattéo Baud	France	84.0	114.7	+0:24
6	13	Marco Heinis	France	84.0	114.6	+0:24
7	28	Perttu Reponen	Finland	87.0	114.4	+0:25
8	30	Mateusz Jarosz	Poland	86.0	113.0	+0:30
9	16	Stefano Radovan	Italy	85.0	110.5	+0:40
10	3	Severin Reiter	Austria	84.5	109.1	+0:46
11	25	Markkus Alter	Estonia	82.5	109.0	+0:46
12	24	Yuto Nishikata	Japan	81.0	108.7	+0:48
12	4	Bartłomiej Klimowski	Poland	83.5	108.7	+0:48
14	14	Taiga Onozawa	Japan	85.0	108.4	+0:49
15	10	Waltteri Karhumaa	Finland	81.0	104.7	+1:04
16	17	Lenard Kersting	Germany	80.5	102.7	+1:12
17	7	Markus Kägu	Estonia	81.0	101.6	+1:16
18	12	Johan Fredriksen Orset	Norway	79.0	100.9	+1:19
19	1	Iacopo Bortolas	Italy	79.5	98.0	+1:30
20	18	Matic Hladnik	Slovenia	76.5	96.9	+1:35
21	29	Andrii Pylypchuk	Ukraine	79.5	95.7	+1:40
22	21	Jan Šimek	Czech Republic	77.5	94.9	+1:43
23	6	Vladimir Malov	Russia	81.0	94.6	+1:44
24	5	David Muhič	Slovenia	77.5	89.4	+2:05
25	27	Nico Zarucchi	Switzerland	70.0	77.6	+2:52
26	8	Lukáš Kohlberger	Czech Republic	69.0	72.5	+3:12
27	23	Svyatoslav Nazarenko	Kazakhstan	64.5	64.9	+3:43
	11	Valentin Yashchuk	Ukraine	Disqualified		
	19	Kirill Averianov	Russia	Disqualified		
	2	Carter Brubaker	United States	Did not start		

=== Cross-country ===
The cross-country part was held at 14:45.

Rank	Bib	Name	Country	Start time	Cross-country time	Cross-country rank	Finish time	Deficit
1st place, gold medalist(s)	1	Stefan Rettenegger	Austria	0:00	14:45.8	2	14:45.8	
2nd place, silver medalist(s)	7	Perttu Reponen	Finland	0:25	14:34.6	1	14:59.6	+13.8
3rd place, bronze medalist(s)	2	Sebastian Østvold	Norway	0:08	14:54.1	7	15:02.1	+16.3
4	5	Mattéo Baud	France	0:24	14:53.3	5	15:17.3	+31.5
5	3	Niklas Malacinski	United States	0:15	15:17.9	10	15:32.9	+47.1
6	9	Stefano Radovan	Italy	0:40	14:53.4	6	15:33.4	+47.6
7	4	Jan Andersen	Germany	0:16	15:22.9	12	15:38.9	+53.1
8	15	Waltteri Karhumaa	Finland	1:04	14:55.5	8	15:59.5	+1:13.7
9	10	Severin Reiter	Austria	0:46	15:13.5	9	15:59.5	+1:13.7
10	16	Lenard Kersting	Germany	1:12	14:47.7	4	15:59.7	+1:13.9
11	6	Marco Heinis	France	0:24	15:36.3	13	16:00.3	+1:14.5
12	18	Johan Fredriksen Orset	Norway	1:19	14:46.4	3	16:05.4	+1:19.6
13	12	Yuto Nishikata	Japan	0:48	15:21.7	11	16:09.7	+1:23.9
14	8	Mateusz Jarosz	Poland	0:30	15:57.8	19	16:27.8	+1:42.0
15	11	Markkus Alter	Estonia	0:46	15:54.1	17	16:40.1	+1:54.3
16	14	Taiga Onozawa	Japan	0:49	16:00.4	21	16:49.4	+2:03.6
17	13	Bartłomiej Klimowski	Poland	0:48	16:09.2	22	16:57.2	+2:11.4
18	19	Iacopo Bortolas	Italy	1:30	15:43.5	15	17:13.5	+2:27.7
19	20	Matic Hladnik	Slovenia	1:35	15:48.6	16	17:23.6	+2:37.8
20	22	Jan Šimek	Czech Republic	1:43	15:43.4	14	17:26.4	+2:40.6
21	21	Andrii Pylypchuk	Ukraine	1:40	16:10.3	23	17:50.3	+3:04.5
22	24	David Muhič	Slovenia	2:05	15:55.3	18	18:00.3	+3:14.5
23	17	Markus Kägu	Estonia	1:16	16:47.1	26	18:03.1	+3:17.3
24	23	Vladimir Malov	Russia	1:44	16:31.1	25	18:15.1	+3:29.3
25	25	Nico Zarucchi	Switzerland	2:52	15:59.8	20	18:51.8	+4:06.0
26	26	Lukáš Kohlberger	Czech Republic	3:12	16:30.1	24	19:42.1	+4:56.3
27	27	Svyatoslav Nazarenko	Kazakhstan	3:43	18:48.4	27	22:31.4	+7:45.6
