= Luge at the 2020 Winter Youth Olympics – Girls' singles =

Girls' singles at the III Winter Youth Olympic Games
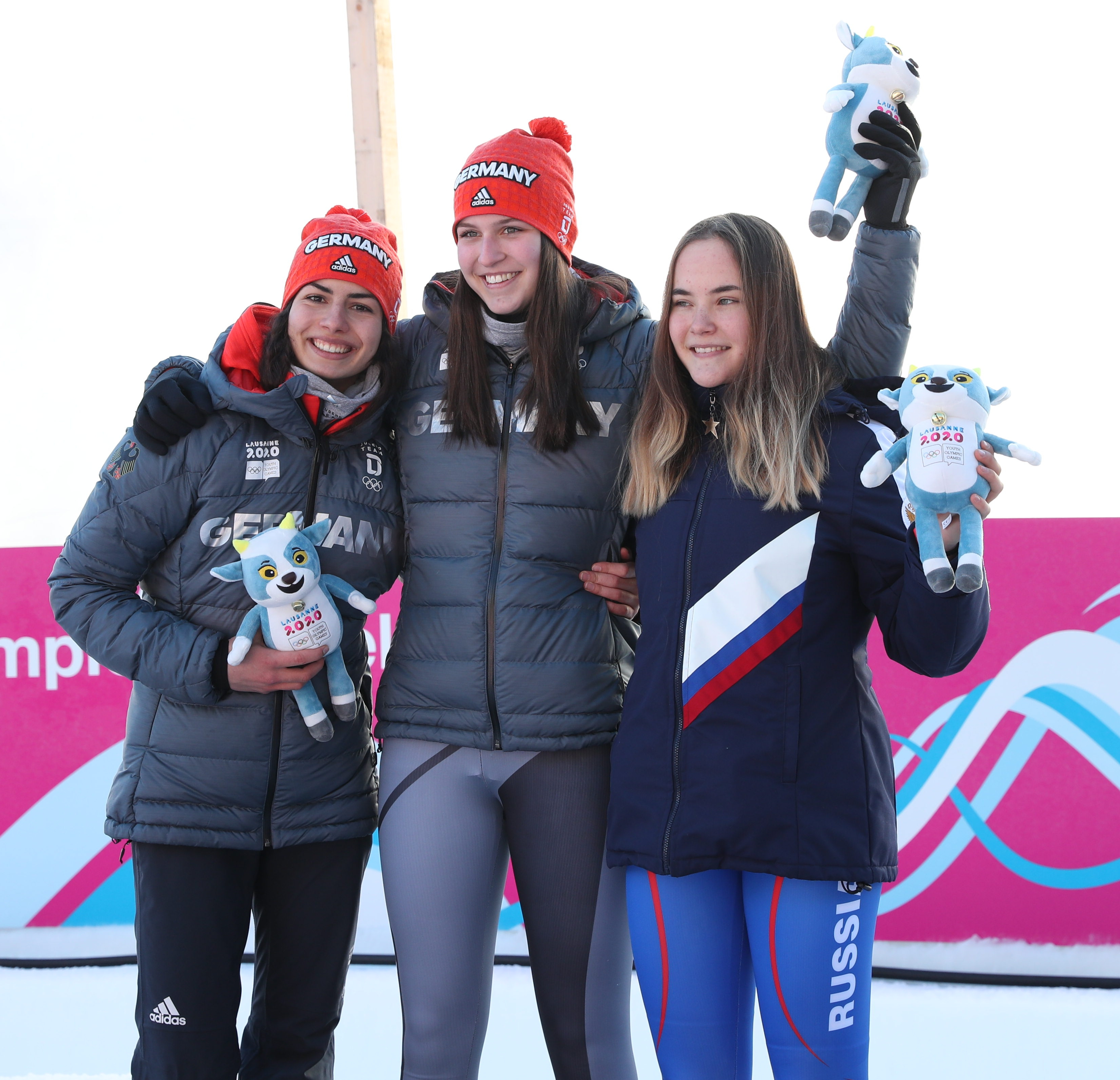
- Venue: St. Moritz-Celerina Olympic Bobrun
- Dates: 17 January
- Competitors: 24 from 17 nations
- Winning time: 1:49.687

Medalists
1st place, gold medalist(s)		Merle Fräbel	Germany
2nd place, silver medalist(s)		Jessica Degenhardt	Germany
3rd place, bronze medalist(s)		Diana Loginova	Russia

The girls' singles luge at the 2020 Winter Youth Olympics took place on 17 January at the St. Moritz-Celerina Olympic Bobrun.

== Results ==
The first run was held at 08:30 and the second run at 09:40.

Rank	Bib	Athlete	Country	Run 1	Rank 1	Run 2	Rank 2	Total	Behind
1st place, gold medalist(s)	8	Merle Fräbel	Germany	55.011	1	54.676	1	1:49.687	
2nd place, silver medalist(s)	11	Jessica Degenhardt	Germany	55.171	3	54.724	2	1:49.895	+0.208
3rd place, bronze medalist(s)	3	Diana Loginova	Russia	55.155	2	54.811	3	1:49.966	+0.279
4	4	Caitlin Nash	Canada	55.483	5	55.075	4	1:50.558	+0.871
5	1	Yulianna Tunytska	Ukraine	55.425	4	55.151	5	1:50.576	+0.889
6	10	Corina Buzățoiu	Romania	55.646	8	55.227	7	1:50.873	+1.186
7	5	Kailey Allan	Canada	55.704	10	55.211	6	1:50.915	+1.228
8	2	Barbara Allmaier	Austria	55.657	9	55.296	8	1:50.953	+1.266
9	9	Elizaveta Yurchenko	Russia	55.566	6	55.441	9	1:51.007	+1.320
10	13	Justīne Maskale	Latvia	55.597	7	55.510	11	1:51.107	+1.420
11	14	Zane Kaluma	Latvia	55.789	11	55.478	10	1:51.267	+1.580
12	7	Nadia Falkensteiner	Italy	55.912	13	55.676	12	1:51.588	+1.901
13	12	Madlen Loss	Austria	55.830	12	55.814	14	1:51.644	+1.957
14	6	Katharina Putzer	Italy	56.138	15	55.775	13	1:51.913	+2.226
15	19	McKenna Mazlo	United States	56.045	14	56.047	16	1:52.092	+2.405
16	16	Anna Bryk	Poland	56.510	18	55.960	15	1:52.470	+2.783
17	15	Nikola Trembošová	Slovakia	56.293	16	56.189	18	1:52.482	+2.795
18	24	Ella Cox	New Zealand	56.424	17	56.171	17	1:52.595	+2.908
19	22	Bianka Petríková	Slovakia	56.658	20	56.322	19	1:52.980	+3.293
20	21	Anna Čežíková	Czech Republic	56.604	19	56.395	20	1:52.999	+3.312
21	20	Ema Kovačič	Slovenia	57.109	22	57.139	21	1:54.248	+4.561
22	17	Yuki Ishikawa	Japan	57.654	23	57.402	22	1:55.056	+5.369
23	18	Våril Tangnes	Norway	56.731	21	58.622	23	1:55.353	+5.666
24	23	Adriana Adam	Moldova	58.779	24	59.199	24	1:57.978	+8.291
