= Nordic combined at the 2020 Winter Youth Olympics – Nordic mixed team normal hill/4 × 3.3 km =

Nordic mixed team normal hill/4 × 3.3 km at the III Winter Youth Olympic Games
- Venue: Les Tuffes Nordic Centre; Vallée de Joux Cross-Country Centre
- Dates: 22 January
- Competitors: 60 from 10 nations
- Winning time: 29:20.5

Medalists
1st place, gold medalist(s)		Gyda Westvold Hansen; Sebastian Østvold; Nora Midtsundstad; Iver Olaussen; Maria Hartz Melling; Nikolai Holmboe	Norway
2nd place, silver medalist(s)		Johanna Bassani; Severin Reiter; Vanessa Moharitsch; David Haagen; Witta-Luisa Walcher; Erik Engel	Austria
3rd place, bronze medalist(s)		Annika Sieff; Stefano Radovan; Jessica Malsiner; Mattia Galiani; Silvia Campione; Elia Barp	Italy

The Nordic mixed team normal hill/4 × 3.3 km competition at the 2020 Winter Youth Olympics was held on 22 January at the Les Tuffes Nordic Centre, France and Vallée de Joux Cross-Country Centre.

== Results ==
=== Ski jumping ===
The ski jumping part was held at 10:00.

Rank	Bib	Country	Distance (m)	Points	Time difference
1	8; 8–1; 8–2; 8–3; 8–4	Norway; Gyda Westvold Hansen; Sebastian Østvold; Nora Midtsundstad; Iver Olaussen	80.0; 81.5; 80.5; 87.0	485.2; 117.0; 121.2; 115.5; 131.5	
2	6; 6–1; 6–2; 6–3; 6–4	Austria; Johanna Bassani; Severin Reiter; Vanessa Moharitsch; David Haagen	81.0; 79.0; 77.0; 86.0	476.5; 114.0; 115.9; 110.8; 135.8	+0:12
3	9; 9–1; 9–2; 9–3; 9–4	Italy; Annika Sieff; Stefano Radovan; Jessica Malsiner; Mattia Galiani	77.0; 77.0; 75.0; 82.0	453.4; 107.2; 115.9; 107.3; 123.0	+0:42
4	7; 7–1; 7–2; 8–3; 8–4	France; Emma Tréand; Mattéo Baud; Joséphine Pagnier; Valentin Foubert	69.5; 83.0; 75.0; 79.0	447.0; 92.6; 126.6; 116.3; 111.5	+0:51
5	10; 10–1; 10–2; 10–3; 10–4	Slovenia; Ema Volavšek; Matic Hladnik; Lara Logar; Jernej Presečnik	62.0; 77.0; 76.0; 88.0	426.0; 73.4; 112.2; 108.9; 131.5	+1:19
6	2; 2–1; 2–2; 2–3; 2–4	Czech Republic; Tereza Koldovská; Jan Šimek; Štěpánka Ptáčková; Jiří Konvalinka	63.0; 76.0; 73.0; 77.0	398.3; 77.1; 105.6; 103.5; 112.1	+1:56
7	5; 5–1; 5–2; 5–3; 5–4	United States; Tess Arnone; Niklas Malacinski; Annika Belshaw; Erik Belshaw	60.0; 79.5; 72.0; 72.0	385.5; 69.3; 119.6; 98.0; 98.6	+2:13
8	1; 1–1; 1–2; 1–3; 1–4	Russia; Aleksandra Tikhonovich; Vladimir Malov; Anna Shpyneva; Danil Sadreev	DSQ; 80.0; 82.5; 87.5	375.8; 0.0; 120.7; 124.6; 130.5	+2:26
9	3; 3–1; 3–2; 3–3; 3–4	Finland; Annamaija Oinas; Perttu Reponen; Julia Tervahartiala; Kasperi Valto	59.5; 81.0; 70.0; 71.5	372.0; 67.4; 115.3; 94.2; 95.1	+2:31
10	4; 4–1; 4–2; 4–3; 4–4	Germany; Emilia Görlich; Lenard Kersting; Anna Jäkle; Finn Braun	74.0; 79.0; 69.5; DSQ	313.7; 101.8; 117.6; 94.3; 0.0	+3:49

=== Cross-country ===
The cross-country part was held at 13:30.

Rank	Bib	Country	Start time	Cross-country time	Rank	Finish time	Deficit
1st place, gold medalist(s)	1; 1–1; 1–2; 1–3; 1–4	Norway; Gyda Westvold Hansen; Sebastian Østvold; Maria Hartz Melling; Nikolai Holmboe	0:00	29:20.5; 8:22.1; 6:52.8; 7:25.7; 6:39.9	2	29:20.5	
2nd place, silver medalist(s)	2; 2–1; 2–2; 2–3; 2–4	Austria; Johanna Bassani; Severin Reiter; Witta-Luisa Walcher; Erik Engel	0:12	30:27.8; 8:28.5; 7:04.5; 7:53.5; 7:01.3	5	30:39.8	+1:19.3
3rd place, bronze medalist(s)	3; 3–1; 3–2; 3–3; 3–4	Italy; Annika Sieff; Stefano Radovan; Silvia Campione; Elia Barp	0:42	30:09.3; 8:22.1; 7:08.5; 8:09.8; 6:28.9	4	30:51.3	+1:30.8
4	4; 4–1; 4–2; 4–3; 4–4	France; Emma Treand; Mattéo Baud; Julie Pierrel; Luc Primet	0:51	30:08.7; 9:00.1; 6:52.4; 7:27.4; 6:48.8	3	30:59.7	+1:39.2
5	5; 5–1; 5–2; 5–3; 5–4	Slovenia; Ema Volavšek; Matic Hladnik; Klara Mali; Anže Gros	1:19	30:38.0; 8:49.0; 7:13.8; 7:50.7; 6:44.5	8	31:57.0	+2:36.5
6	7; 7–1; 7–2; 8–3; 8–4	United States; Tess Arnone; Niklas Malacinski; Sydney Palmer-Leger; Will Koch	2:13	30:32.4; 8:59.9; 7:14.7; 7:37.1; 6:40.7	7	32:45.4	+3:24.9
7	10; 10–1; 10–2; 10–3; 10–4	Germany; Emilia Görlich; Lenard Kersting; Lara Dellit; Elias Keck	3:49	29:09.8; 8:15.1; 6:44.8; 7:36.0; 6:33.9	1	32:58.8	+3:38.3
8	9; 9–1; 9–2; 9–3; 9–4	Finland; Annamaija Oinas; Perttu Reponen; Eevi-Inkeri Tossavainen; Alexander Ståhlberg	2:31	30:31.2; 9:03.3; 7:17.2; 7:35.5; 6:35.2	6	33:02.2	+3:41.7
9	8; 8–1; 8–2; 8–3; 8–4	Russia; Aleksandra Tikhonovich; Vladimir Malov; Evgeniya Krupitskaya; Iliya Tregubov	2:26	31:00.9; 9:03.3; 7:33.7; 7:35.8; 6:52.3	9	33:26.9	+4:06.4
10	6; 6–1; 6–2; 6–3; 6–4	Czech Republic; Tereza Koldovská; Jan Šimek; Eliška Šibravová; Mathias Vacek	1:56	32:11.9; 10:02.4; 7:13.9; 8:10.3; 6:45.3	10	34:07.9	+4:47.4
