= Nordic combined at the 2020 Winter Youth Olympics =

Nordic combined at the III Winter Youth Olympic Games
- Venue: Les Tuffes
- Dates: 18–22 January
- Competitors: 53 from 17 nations

Nordic combined at the 2020 Winter Youth Olympics took place in Les Tuffes, France.

== Medal summary ==
=== Medal table ===
Rank	Nation	Gold	Silver	Bronze	Total
1	Austria	2	1	0	3
2	Norway	1	0	1	2
3	Finland	0	1	0	1
3	Japan	0	1	0	1
5	Germany	0	0	1	1
5	Italy	0	0	1	1
Totals (6 entries)		3	3	3	9

=== Events ===
Event	Gold		Silver		Bronze	
Boys' individual normal hill/6 km	Stefan Rettenegger; Austria	14:45.8	Perttu Reponen; Finland	14:59.6	Sebastian Østvold; Norway	15:02.1
Girls' individual normal hill/4 km	Lisa Hirner; Austria	11:45.6	Ayane Miyazaki; Japan	11:48.8	Jenny Nowak; Germany	11:50.3
Nordic mixed team normal hill/4 × 3.3 km	Norway; Gyda Westvold Hansen; Sebastian Østvold; Nora Midtsundstad; Iver Olaussen; Maria Hartz Melling; Nikolai Holmboe	29:20.5	Austria; Johanna Bassani; Severin Reiter; Vanessa Moharitsch; David Haagen; Witta-Luisa Walcher; Erik Engel	30:39.8	Italy; Annika Sieff; Stefano Radovan; Jessica Malsiner; Mattia Galiani; Silvia Campione; Elia Barp	30:51.3

== Qualification ==
=== Qualification summary ===
NOC	Boys	Girls	Total
Austria	2	2	4
Czech Republic	2	2	4
Estonia	2	1	3
Finland	2	1	3
France	2	2	4
Germany	2	2	4
Great Britain		1	1
Italy	2	2	4
Japan	2	2	4
Kazakhstan	1		1
Norway	2	2	4
Poland	2		2
Russia	2	2	4
Slovenia	2	2	4
Switzerland	1		1
Ukraine	2		2
United States	2	2	4
Total: 17 NOCs	30	23	53
