= Speed skating at the 2020 Winter Youth Olympics – Boys' 1500 metres =

Boys' 1500 metres at the III Winter Youth Olympic Games
- Venue: Lake St. Moritz
- Date: 13 January
- Competitors: 32 from 19 nations
- Winning time: 1:52.24

Medalists
1st place, gold medalist(s)		Motonaga Arito	Japan
2nd place, silver medalist(s)		Pavel Taran	Russia
3rd place, bronze medalist(s)		Jonathan Tobon	United States

The boys' 1500 metres speed skating competition of the 2020 Winter Youth Olympics will be held at Lake St. Moritz on 13 January 2020.

== Results ==
The races were held at 12:45.

Rank	Pair	Lane	Name	Country	Time	Time Behind
1st place, gold medalist(s)	16	o	Motonaga Arito	Japan	1:52.24	
2nd place, silver medalist(s)	13	i	Pavel Taran	Russia	1:53.74	+1.50
3rd place, bronze medalist(s)	13	o	Jonathan Tobon	United States	1:55.67	+3.43
4	14	o	Diego Amaya	Colombia	1:55.80	+3.56
5	9	i	Remo Slotegraaf	Netherlands	1:56.87	+4.63
6	16	i	Sander Eitrem	Norway	1:57.11	+4.87
7	15	i	Park Sang-eon	South Korea	1:57.15	+4.91
8	11	i	Nil Llop	Spain	1:58.00	+5.76
9	15	o	Sun Jiazhao	China	1:58.10	+5.86
10	14	i	Yudai Yamamoto	Japan	1:59.36	+7.12
11	12	i	Sebas Diniz	Netherlands	1:59.47	+7.23
12	10	o	Oddbjørn Mellemstrand	Norway	1:59.48	+7.24
13	2	o	Filip Hawrylak	Poland	2:00.02	+7.78
14	10	i	Alexander Sergeev	Russia	2:00.26	+8.02
15	11	o	Andrei Herman	Belarus	2:00.50	+8.26
16	5	i	Felix Motschmann	Germany	2:01.53	+9.29
17	9	o	Max Fiodarav	Belarus	2:01.76	+9.52
18	6	i	Manuel Zähringer	Germany	2:01.87	+9.63
19	12	o	Ignaz Gschwentner	Austria	2:02.15	+9.91
20	7	o	Nuraly Akzhol	Kazakhstan	2:02.73	+10.49
21	8	o	Jordan Stolz	United States	2:02.84	+10.60
22	5	o	Jakub Kočí	Czech Republic	2:03.54	+11.30
23	8	i	Lukáš Steklý	Czech Republic	2:04.00	+11.76
24	4	o	Flavio Gross	Switzerland	2:04.45	+12.21
25	2	i	Yang Suk-hoon	South Korea	2:04.61	+12.37
26	3	i	Michał Kopacz	Poland	2:04.99	+12.75
27	1	i	Nicky Rosanelli	Italy	2:05.28	+13.04
28	6	o	Eetu Käsnänen	Finland	2:05.55	+13.31
29	7	i	Xue Zhiwen	China	2:07.44	+15.20
30	1	o	Tuukka Suomalainen	Finland	2:07.80	+15.56
31	3	o	Yevgeniy Koshkin	Kazakhstan	2:08.00	+15.76
32	4	i	Theo Collins	Great Britain	2:09.43	+17.19
