= Speed skating at the 2020 Winter Youth Olympics – Boys' 500 metres =

Boys' 500 metres at the III Winter Youth Olympic Games
- Venue: Lake St. Moritz
- Date: 12 January
- Competitors: 31 from 18 nations
- Winning time: 36.42

Medalists
1st place, gold medalist(s)		Yudai Yamamoto	Japan
2nd place, silver medalist(s)		Nil Llop	Spain
3rd place, bronze medalist(s)		Xue Zhiwen	China

The boys' 500 metres speed skating competition of the 2020 Winter Youth Olympics was held at Lake St. Moritz on 12 January 2020.

== Results ==
The races were held at 12:30.

Rank	Pair	Lane	Name	Country	Time	Time Behind
1st place, gold medalist(s)	15	o	Yudai Yamamoto	Japan	36.42	
2nd place, silver medalist(s)	13	i	Nil Llop	Spain	36.60	+0.18
3rd place, bronze medalist(s)	13	o	Xue Zhiwen	China	36.67	+0.25
4	14	i	Diego Amaya	Colombia	37.05	+0.63
5	11	i	Jordan Stolz	United States	37.34	+0.92
6	15	i	Ignaz Gschwentner	Austria	37.58	+1.16
7	14	o	Yang Suk-hoon	South Korea	37.66	+1.24
8	12	i	Jonathan Tobon	United States	37.78	+1.36
9	10	o	Alexander Sergeev	Russia	38.03	+1.61
10	10	i	Sun Jiazhao	China	38.11	+1.69
11	16	i	Pavel Taran	Russia	38.17	+1.75
12	11	o	Nicky Rosanelli	Italy	38.22	+1.80
13	8	i	Motonaga Arito	Japan	38.31	+1.89
14	12	o	Felix Motschmann	Germany	38.51	+2.09
15	5	o	Park Sang-eon	South Korea	38.56	+2.14
16	8	o	Michał Kopacz	Poland	38.58	+2.16
17	9	o	Remo Slotegraaf	Netherlands	38.68	+2.26
18	6	o	Oddbjørn Mellemstrand	Norway	38.85	+2.43
19	6	i	Tuukka Suomalainen	Finland	38.93	+2.51
20	7	o	Eetu Käsnänen	Finland	38.97	+2.55
21	9	i	Yevgeniy Koshkin	Kazakhstan	39.01	+2.59
22	3	i	Manuel Zähringer	Germany	39.34	+2.92
23	2	o	Filip Hawrylak	Poland	39.60	+3.18
24	5	i	Sander Eitrem	Norway	39.62	+3.20
25	7	i	Max Fiodarav	Belarus	39.65	+3.23
26	4	o	Nuraly Akzhol	Kazakhstan	40.07	+3.65
27	2	i	Andrei Herman	Belarus	40.35	+3.93
28	4	i	Theo Collins	Great Britain	40.59	+4.17
29	1	i	Lukáš Steklý	Czech Republic	41.12	+4.70
30	3	o	Jakub Kočí	Czech Republic	41.64	+5.22
31	16	o	Sebas Diniz	Netherlands	2:11.01	+94.59
