= Speed skating at the 2020 Winter Youth Olympics – Girls' mass start =

Girls' mass start at the III Winter Youth Olympic Games
- Venue: Lake St. Moritz
- Date: 16 January
- Competitors: 31 from 17 nations
- Winning points: 30

Medalists
1st place, gold medalist(s)		Yang Binyu	China
2nd place, silver medalist(s)		Zuzana Kuršová	Czech Republic
3rd place, bronze medalist(s)		Katia Filippi	Italy

The girls' mass start speed skating competition of the 2020 Winter Youth Olympics was held at Lake St. Moritz on 16 January 2020.

== Results ==
=== Semifinals ===
The first semifinal was held at 12:05, the second at 12:15.

==== Semifinal 1 ====
Rank	Name	Country	Points	Time	Notes
1	Kang Soo-min	South Korea	30	6:48.34	Q
2	Fran Vanhoutte	Belgium	21	6:49.87	Q
3	Wang Jingyi	China	10	6:50.56	Q
4	Yukino Yoshida	Japan	4	6:50.83	Q
5	Aleksandra Rutkovskaia	Russia	3	6:51.12	Q
6	Luisa González	Spain	3	6:52.58	Q
7	Victoria Stirnemann	Germany	3	6:52.86	Q
8	Varvara Bandaryna	Belarus	3	7:03.60	Q
9	Alina Dauranova	Kazakhstan	2	6:53.29	
10	Julie Berg Sjøbrend	Norway	0	6:53.02	
11	Kateřina Macháčková	Czech Republic	0	6:53.27	
12	Serena Pergher	Italy	0	7:00.85	
13	Ramona Ionel	Romania	0	7:02.43	
14	Daria Kopacz	Poland	0	7:10.43	
15	Laura Kivioja	Finland	0	7:22.21	
	Myrthe de Boer	Netherlands		DNS	

==== Semifinal 2 ====
Rank	Name	Country	Points	Time	Notes
1	Yang Binyu	China	30	6:13.67	Q
2	Yuka Takahashi	Japan	20	6:13.86	Q
3	Amalie Haugland	Norway	10	6:14.08	Q
4	Katia Filippi	Italy	7	6:14.62	Q
5	Zuzana Kuršová	Czech Republic	3	6:15.28	Q
6	Anna Ostlender	Germany	3	6:15.42	Q
7	Isabel Grevelt	Netherlands	3	6:24.88	Q
8	Carla Álvarez	Spain	2	6:43.40	Q
9	Karyna Shypulia	Belarus	1	6:17.10	
10	Valeriia Sorokoletova	Russia	0	6:15.93	
11	Marta Dobrowolska	Poland	0	6:16.31	
12	Kim Min-hui	South Korea	0	6:21.45	
13	Ilka Füzesy	Romania	0	6:26.66	
14	Darya Gavrilova	Kazakhstan	0	6:27.57	
15	Sini Siro	Finland	0	6:27.93	
16	Hanna Bíró	Hungary	0	6:39.36	

=== Final ===
The final was held at 13:10.

Rank	Name	Country	Points	Time
1st place, gold medalist(s)	Yang Binyu	China	30	6:50.68
2nd place, silver medalist(s)	Zuzana Kuršová	Czech Republic	25	6:50.90
3rd place, bronze medalist(s)	Katia Filippi	Italy	10	6:51.03
4	Varvara Bandaryna	Belarus	5	7:24.05
5	Yuka Takahashi	Japan	4	6:51.07
6	Kang Soo-min	South Korea	2	6:51.18
7	Aleksandra Rutkovskaia	Russia	2	6:57.74
8	Anna Ostlender	Germany	1	6:52.12
9	Fran Vanhoutte	Belgium	0	6:52.72
10	Isabel Grevelt	Netherlands	0	6:53.07
11	Victoria Stirnemann	Germany	0	6:53.08
12	Luisa González	Spain	0	6:53.45
13	Amalie Haugland	Norway	0	6:57.11
14	Yukino Yoshida	Japan	0	6:57.26
15	Carla Álvarez	Spain	0	7:15.23
16	Wang Jingyi	China		DNF
