= Ski mountaineering at the 2020 Winter Youth Olympics – Boys' sprint =

Boys' sprint at the III Winter Youth Olympic Games
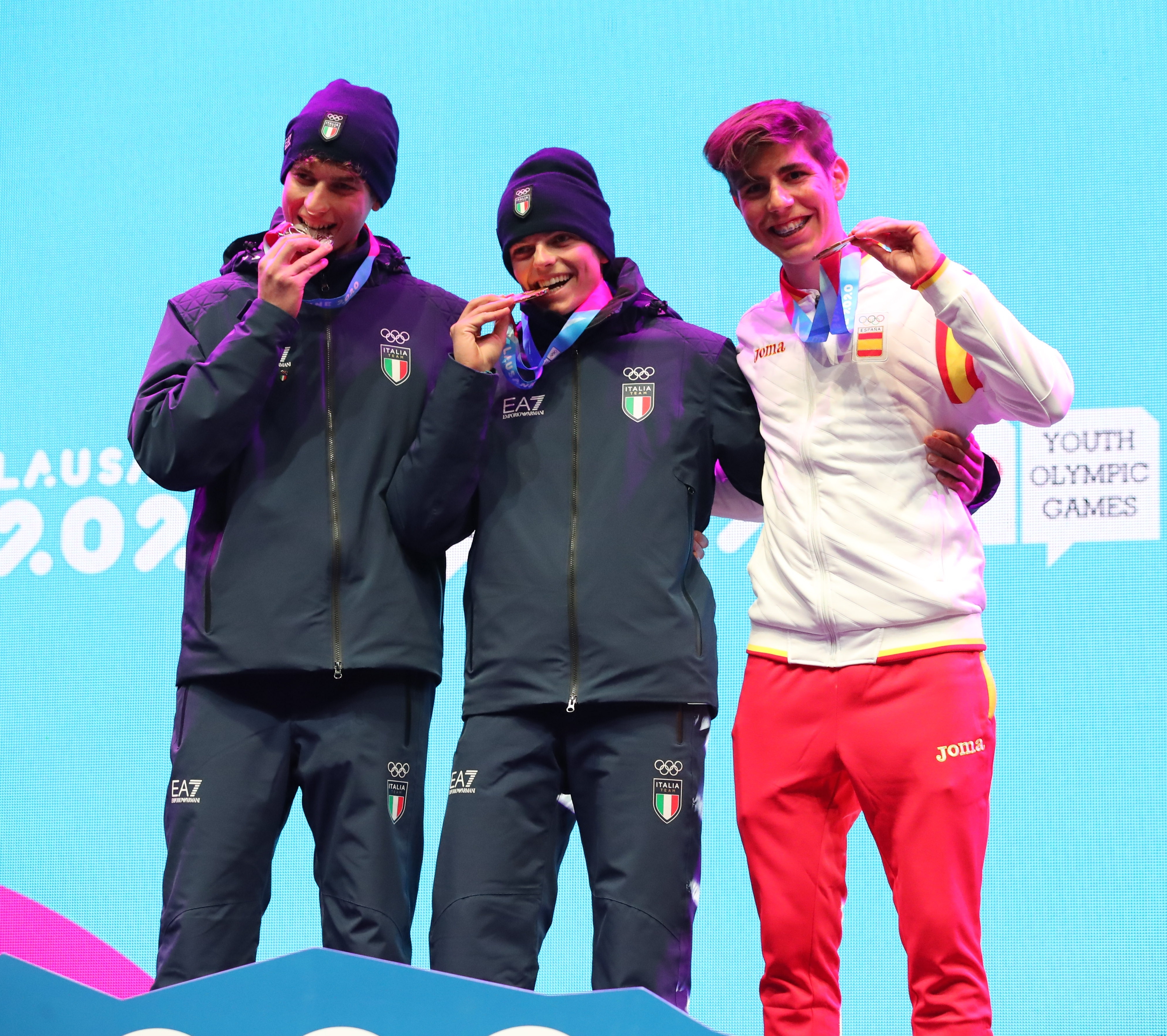
- Venue: Villars Winter Park
- Date: 13 January
- Competitors: 24 from 16 nations

Medalists
1st place, gold medalist(s)		Rocco Baldini	Italy
2nd place, silver medalist(s)		Luca Tomasoni	Italy
3rd place, bronze medalist(s)		Ot Ferrer	Spain

The boys' sprint ski mountaineering competition at the 2020 Winter Youth Olympics was held on 13 January at the Villars Winter Park.

== Results ==
=== Seeding ===
Rank	Bib	Name	Country	Time	Deficit
1	1	Oriol Olm	Andorra	2:44.53	
2	12	Bazil Ducouret	France	2:49.37	+4.84
3	24	Thomas Bussard	Switzerland	2:51.19	+6.66
4	21	Rocco Baldini	Italy	2:53.40	+8.87
5	18	Julian Tritscher	Austria	2:53.76	+9.23
6	7	Marc Ràdua	Spain	2:54.92	+10.39
7	22	Nils Oberauer	Austria	2:55.50	+10.97
8	19	Trym Dalset Lødøen	Norway	2:57.72	+13.19
9	23	Robin Bussard	Switzerland	2:59.16	+14.63
10	20	Ot Ferrer	Spain	3:00.26	+15.73
11	16	Finn Hösch	Germany	3:03.58	+19.05
12	15	Anselme Damevin	France	3:05.86	+21.33
13	17	Luca Tomasoni	Italy	3:06.03	+21.50
14	13	George Beck	United States	3:06.06	+21.53
15	11	Constantin Surdu	Romania	3:07.74	+23.21
16	9	Matúš Černek	Slovakia	3:10.53	+26.00
17	5	Ali Kalhor	Iran	3:11.57	+27.04
18	8	Jeremiah Vaille	United States	3:12.19	+27.66
19	6	Franz Eder	Germany	3:15.77	+31.24
20	10	Liang Qifan	China	3:16.69	+32.16
21	4	Findlay Eyre	Canada	3:17.83	+33.30
22	3	George Petruţ Cotinghiu	Romania	3:20.58	+36.05
23	14	Nikita Philippov	Russia	3:21.27	+36.74
24	2	Kim Min-jun	South Korea	4:29.97	+1:45.44

=== Elimination round ===
The top three finishers from each heat advance to the next round.

==== Quarterfinals ====
Heat 1

Rank	Bib	Name	Country	Time	Deficit	Notes
1	1	Oriol Olm	Andorra	2:42.80		Q
2	23	Robin Bussard	Switzerland	2:42.92	+0.12	Q
3	19	Trym Dalset Lødøen	Norway	3:02.39	+19.59	Q
4	5	Ali Kalhor	Iran	3:02.87	+20.07	
5	9	Matúš Černek	Slovakia	3:15.10	+32.30	
6	2	Kim Min-jun	South Korea	4:41.24	+1:58.44	

Heat 2

Rank	Bib	Name	Country	Time	Deficit	Notes
1	21	Rocco Baldini	Italy	2:42.91		Q
2	18	Julian Tritscher	Austria	2:45.85	+2.94	Q
3	17	Luca Tomasoni	Italy	2:49.34	+6.43	Q
4	15	Anselme Damevin	France	2:56.71	+13.80	
5	6	Franz Eder	Germany	3:05.72	+22.81	
6	3	George Petruţ Cotinghiu	Romania	3:13.25	+30.34	

Heat 3

Rank	Bib	Name	Country	Time	Deficit	Notes
1	12	Bazil Ducouret	France	2:48.85		Q
2	20	Ot Ferrer	Spain	2:49.07	+0.22	Q
3	14	Nikita Philippov	Russia	2:51.56	+2.71	Q
4	22	Nils Oberauer	Austria	3:04.95	+16.10	
5	8	Jeremiah Vaille	United States	3:05.73	+16.88	
6	11	Constantin Surdu	Romania	3:11.28	+22.43	

Heat 4

Rank	Bib	Name	Country	Time	Deficit	Notes
1	7	Marc Ràdua	Spain	2:40.15		Q
2	16	Finn Hösch	Germany	2:44.61	+4.46	Q
3	24	Thomas Bussard	Switzerland	2:45.60	+5.45	Q
4	10	Liang Qifan	China	2:54.08	+13.93	
5	13	George Beck	United States	3:04.40	+24.25	
6	4	Findlay Eyre	Canada	3:05.64	+25.49	

==== Semifinals ====
Semifinal 1

Rank	Bib	Name	Country	Time	Deficit	Notes
1	17	Luca Tomasoni	Italy	2:38.53		Q
2	18	Julian Tritscher	Austria	2:39.20	+0.67	Q
3	21	Rocco Baldini	Italy	2:39.28	+0.75	Q
4	23	Robin Bussard	Switzerland	2:42.34	+3.81	
5	1	Oriol Olm	Andorra	2:45.46	+6.93	
6	19	Trym Dalset Lødøen	Norway	2:49.83	+11.30	

Semifinal 2

Rank	Bib	Name	Country	Time	Deficit	Notes
1	20	Ot Ferrer	Spain	2:42.90		Q
2	14	Nikita Philippov	Russia	2:44.73	+1.83	Q
3	7	Marc Ràdua	Spain	2:44.80	+1.90	Q
4	16	Finn Hösch	Germany	2:46.43	+3.53	
5	12	Bazil Ducouret	France	2:48.11	+5.21	
6	24	Thomas Bussard	Switzerland	3:08.78	+25.88	

==== Final ====
Rank	Bib	Name	Country	Time	Deficit
1st place, gold medalist(s)	21	Rocco Baldini	Italy	2:30.14	
2nd place, silver medalist(s)	17	Luca Tomasoni	Italy	2:38.01	+7.87
3rd place, bronze medalist(s)	20	Ot Ferrer	Spain	2:43.28	+13.14
4	18	Julian Tritscher	Austria	2:44.57	+14.43
5	7	Marc Ràdua	Spain	2:47.27	+17.13
6	14	Nikita Philippov	Russia	7:44.72	+5:14.58
