= Nordic combined at the 2022 European Youth Olympic Winter Festival =

- Venue: Lahti Sports Center
- Date: 22–25 March
- Website: eyof2022.fi

Nordic combined at the 2022 European Youth Olympic Winter Festival was held from 22 to 25 March at Lahti Sports Center in Lahti, Finland.

== Competition schedule ==
Date	Time	Event
22 March	16:00; 18:15	Girls' individual Gundersen
23 March	10:00; 12:30	Boys individual Gundersen
25 March	14:00; 16:00	Mixed team
Source: All times are (UTC+2)

== Medal summary ==
=== Medal table ===
Rank	Nation	Gold	Silver	Bronze	Total
1	Austria (AUT)	1	1	1	3
2	Italy (ITA)	1	0	1	2
3	Norway (NOR)	1	0	0	1
4	Czech Republic (CZE)	0	1	0	1
4	Germany (GER)	0	1	0	1
6	France (FRA)	0	0	1	1
Totals (6 entries)		3	3	3	9

=== Events ===
Event	Gold		Silver		Bronze	
Boys' individual normal hill/6 km	Eidar Johan Strøm; Norway	14:45	Jiří Konvalinka; Czech Republic	14:46	Marco Heinis; France	15:01
Girls' individual normal hill/4 km	Annika Sieff; Italy	10:50	Lisa Hirner; Austria	11:05	Annalena Slamik; Austria	11:24
Mixed team normal hill/4 × 3.3 km	Austria; Lisa Hirner; Samuel Lev; Annalena Slamik; Severin Reiter	36:01.8	Germany; Cindy Haasch; Benedikt Gräbert; Magdalena Burger; Tristan Sommerfeldt	36:27.7	Italy; Annika Sieff; Stefano Radovan; Greta Pinzani; Iacopo Bortolas	37:34.4
