= Japan at the 2020 Winter Youth Olympics =

- IOC code: JPN
- NOC: Japanese Olympic Committee
- Website: www.joc.or.jp

in Lausanne
- Competitors: 72 in 14 sports
- Flag bearer: Yuma Kagiyama
- Medals Ranked 3rd: Gold 9 Silver 7 Bronze 1 Total 17

Winter Youth Olympics appearances (overview)
- 2012; 2016; 2020; 2024

Japan competed at the 2020 Winter Youth Olympics in Lausanne, Switzerland from 9 to 22 January 2020.

== Medalists ==
Medal	Name	Sport	Event	Date
Gold	Yudai Yamamoto	Speed skating	Boys' 500 metres	12 January
Gold	Yuma Kagiyama	Figure skating	Boys' singles	12 January
Gold	Motonaga Arito	Speed skating	Boys' 1500 metres	13 January
Gold	Motonaga Arito	Speed skating	Boys' mass start	16 January
Gold	Mitsuki Ono	Snowboarding	Girls' halfpipe	20 January
Gold	Ruka Hirano	Snowboarding	Boys' halfpipe	21 January
Gold	Yuko Chujo; Yuzuyu Fujii; Nao Fukuda; Komomo Ito; Makoto Ito; Minami Kamada; Kaaya Komoto; Nagomi Murakami; Rio Noro; Riri Noro; Reina Sato; Hina Shimomukai; An Shinoda; Himari Suzuki; Masaki Tanabe; Kyoka Tsutsumi; Harua Umemori	Ice hockey	Girls' tournament	21 January
Gold	Ryoma Kimata	Snowboarding	Boys' big air	22 January
Gold	Hinari Asanuma	Snowboarding	Girls' big air	22 January
Silver	Yuka Takahashi	Speed skating	Girls' 1500 metres	13 January
Silver	Takumi Maeda; Momoha Tabata; Asei Nakahara; Mina Kobayashi	Curling	Mixed team	16 January
Silver	Ayane Miyazaki	Nordic combined	Girls' normal hill individual/4 km	18 January
Silver	Manon Kaji	Snowboarding	Girls' halfpipe	20 January
Silver	Kaishu Hirano	Snowboarding	Boys' halfpipe	21 January
Silver	Ayane Miyazaki; Yuto Nishikata; Machiko Kubota; Sota Kudo	Ski jumping	Mixed team normal hill	20 January
Silver	Aoto Kawakami	Snowboarding	Boys' big air	22 January
Bronze	Yukino Yoshida	Speed skating	Girls' 500 metres	12 January

=== Medalists in mixed NOCs events ===
Medal	Name	Sport	Event	Date
Gold	Yukino Yoshida	Speed skating	Mixed team sprint	15 February
Gold	Utana Yoshida; Shingo Nishiyama	Figure skating	Team trophy	15 January
Silver	Motonaga Arito	Speed skating	Mixed team sprint	15 February
Silver	Yuma Kagiyama	Figure skating	Team trophy	15 January
Silver	Reina Sato	Ice hockey	Girls' 3x3 mixed tournament	15 January
Bronze	Yuna Kusama	Ice hockey	Girls' 3x3 mixed tournament	15 January

== Alpine skiing ==
Boys

Athlete	Event	Run 1		Run 2		Total	
Athlete	Event	Time	Rank	Time	Rank	Time	Rank
Ohra Kimishima	Super-G	—N/a				58.52	42
Ohra Kimishima	Combined	58.52	42	36.02	23	1:34.54	26
Ohra Kimishima	Giant slalom	DNF					
Ohra Kimishima	Slalom	38.54	17	40.94	10	1:19.48	11

Girls

Athlete	Event	Run 1		Run 2		Total	
Athlete	Event	Time	Rank	Time	Rank	Time	Rank
Yuka Wakatsuki	Super-G	—N/a				1:02.38	41
Yuka Wakatsuki	Combined	1:02.38	41	41.47	26	1:43.85	28
Yuka Wakatsuki	Giant slalom	1:10.59	34	1:09.44	27	2:20.03	26
Yuka Wakatsuki	Slalom	49.79	29	48.98	25	1:38.77	24

Mixed

Athlete	Event	Round of 16	Quarterfinals	Semifinals	Final / BM	
Athlete	Event	Opposition Result	Opposition Result	Opposition Result	Opposition Result	Rank
Ohra Kimishima; Yuka Wakatsuki	Team	Norway; L 0–4	Did not advance			16

== Biathlon ==
Boys

Athlete	Event	Time	Misses	Rank
Taiki Ito	Sprint	24:27.9	5 (2+3)	81
Taiki Ito	Individual	46:57.6	13 (3+5+4+1)	91
Keita Momen	Sprint	25:35.7	7 (3+4)	90
Keita Momen	Individual	43:19.5	8 (3+3+1+1)	81
Chiharu Ueda	Sprint	22:38.0	5 (1+4)	52
Chiharu Ueda	Individual	42:20.7	10 (2+4+2+2)	71

Girls

Athlete	Event	Time	Misses	Rank
Kurea Matsuoka	Sprint	23:18.7	2 (1+1)	75
Kurea Matsuoka	Individual	43:44.6	7 (3+1+2+1)	78
Misa Sasaki	Sprint	23:32.6	5 (3+2)	78
Misa Sasaki	Individual	40:58.3	7 (2+3+1+1)	66

Mixed

Athletes	Event	Time	Misses	Rank
Misa Sasaki; Chiharu Ueda	Single mixed relay	52:38.7	10+20	28
Misa Sasaki; Kurea Matsuoka; Chiharu Ueda; Taiki Ito	Mixed relay	1:33:11.3	14+21	24

== Cross-country skiing ==
Girls

Athlete	Event	Qualification		Quarterfinal		Semifinal		Final	
Athlete	Event	Time	Rank	Time	Rank	Time	Rank	Time	Rank
Chika Honda	5 km classic	—N/a						15:34.3	19
Chika Honda	Free sprint	2:57.31	27 Q	2:54.69	6	Did not advance			28
Chika Honda	Cross-country cross	5:27.62	33	Did not advance					

== Curling ==
Japan qualified a mixed team of four athletes.

Mixed team

Team	Event	Group stage						Quarterfinal	Semifinal	Final / BM	
Team	Event	Opposition Score	Opposition Score	Opposition Score	Opposition Score	Opposition Score	Rank	Opposition Score	Opposition Score	Opposition Score	Rank
Takumi Maeda; Momoha Tabata; Asei Nakahara; Mina Kobayashi	Mixed team	Sweden; W 7 – 4	Czech Republic; W 8 – 1	United States; W 8 – 2	Italy; L 6 – 7	Latvia; W 9 – 4	2 Q	Canada; W 5 – 4	New Zealand; W 8 – 4	Norway; L 4 – 5	2nd place, silver medalist(s)

Mixed doubles

Athletes	Event	Round of 48	Round of 24	Round of 12	Round of 6	Semifinals	Final / BM	
Athletes	Event	Opposition Result	Opposition Result	Opposition Result	Opposition Result	Opposition Result	Opposition Result	Rank
Mina Kobayashi (JPN); Leo Tuaz (FRA)	Mixed doubles	Pražáková (CZE); Moon (KOR); W 6–5	Jensen (DEN); Zhai (CHN); W 8–7	Szmidt (POL); Rankin (GBR); W 9–2	Nagy (HUN); Young (CAN); L 1–8 LL	Nagy (HUN); Young (CAN); L 2–6	Pei (CHN); Chabičovský (CZE); L 3–7	4
Takumi Maeda (JPN); Ērika Bitmete (LAT)	Mixed doubles	Ghedina (ITA); Omerzel (SLO); W 8–6	Klammer (EST); Vlasenko (RUS); W 8–7	Vergnaud (FRA); Burås (NOR); L 8–9	Did not advance			7
Asei Nakahara (JPN); Gabi Rogic Farias (BRA)	Mixed doubles	Antes (GER); Szarvas (HUN); L 2–9	Did not advance					25
Momoha Tabata (JPN); Romet Mäesalu (EST)	Mixed doubles	Wiksten (DEN); Craik (GBR); L 6–8	Did not advance					25

== Figure skating ==
Two Japanese figure skaters achieved quota places for Japan based on the results of the 2019 World Junior Figure Skating Championships.

Singles

Athlete	Event	SP		FS		Total	
Athlete	Event	Points	Rank	Points	Rank	Points	Rank
Yuma Kagiyama	Boys' singles	72.76	3	166.41	1	239.17	1st place, gold medalist(s)
Mana Kawabe	Girls' singles	65.84	4	119.38	3	185.22	4

Couples

Athlete	Event	SP		FS		Total	
Athlete	Event	Points	Rank	Points	Rank	Points	Rank
Shingo Nishiyama; Utana Yoshida	Ice dancing	56.38	6	92.32	4	148.70	6

Mixed NOC team trophy

Athletes	Event	Free skate/Free dance					
Athletes	Event	Ice dance	Pairs	Girls	Boys	Total	
Athletes	Event	Points Team points	Points Team points	Points Team points	Points Team points	Points	Rank
Team Courage; Utana Yoshida / Shingo Nishiyama (JPN); Alina Butaeva / Luka Berulava (GEO); Ksenia Sinitsyna (RUS); Arlet Levandi (EST)	Team trophy	99.21; 8	100.70; 6	127.63; 8	97.63; 2	24	1st place, gold medalist(s)
Team Focus; Sofya Tyutyunina / Alexander Shustitskiy (RUS); Cate Fleming / Jedidah Isbell (USA); Kate Wang (USA); Yuma Kagiyama (JPN)	Team trophy	96.39; 7	91.34; 3	101.84; 4	157.62; 8	22	2nd place, silver medalist(s)

== Freestyle skiing ==
Slopestyle & Big Air

Athlete	Event	Qualification				Final				
Athlete	Event	Run 1	Run 2	Best	Rank	Run 1	Run 2	Run 3	Best	Rank
Ruka Ito	Boys' big air	60.00	62.25	62.25	16	Did not advance				
Ruka Ito	Boys' slopestyle	63.33	9.33	63.33	12 Q	21.66	11.66	75.66	75.66	8
Yuna Koga	Girls' halfpipe	33.66	38.33	38.33	14	Did not advance				
Yuna Koga	Girls' slopestyle	37.25	43.50	43.50	12 Q	50.25	DNS	DNS	50.25	9
Akane Nakata	Girls' halfpipe	43.33	47.00	47.00	11	Did not advance				

== Ice hockey ==
=== Girls' tournament ===
Summary

Key:

- OT – Overtime
- GWS – Match decided by penalty-shootout

Team	Event	Group stage			Semifinal	Final	
Team	Event	Opposition Score	Opposition Score	Rank	Opposition Score	Opposition Score	Rank
Japan girls'	Girls' tournament	Czech Republic; W 4–1	Switzerland; W 5–1	1 Q	Slovakia; W 5–0	Sweden; W 4–1	1st place, gold medalist(s)

Team roster

- Yuko Chujo
- Yuzuyu Fujii
- Nao Fukuda
- Komomo Ito
- Makoto Ito
- Minami Kamada
- Kaaya Komoto
- Nagomi Murakami
- Rio Noro
- Riri Noro
- Reina Sato
- Hina Shimomukai
- An Shinoda
- Himari Suzuki
- Masaki Tanabe
- Kyoka Tsutsumi
- Harua Umemori

=== Mixed NOC 3x3 tournament ===
Boys

- Gosei Daikuhara
- Issa Otsuka
- Wataru Suzuki
- Tomoyoshi Yuki

Girls

- Sena Hasegawa
- Ruka Kiyokawa
- Yuna Kusama
- Riko Matsumoto
- Reina Sato

== Luge ==
Girls

Athlete	Event	Run 1		Run 2		Total	
Athlete	Event	Time	Rank	Time	Rank	Time	Rank
Yuki Ishikawa	Singles	57.654	23	57.402	22	1:55.056	22

== Nordic combined ==
Individual

Athlete	Event	Ski jumping				Cross-country	
Athlete	Event	Distance	Points	Rank	Deficit	Time	Rank
Yuto Nishikata	Boys' Normal hill/6 km	81.0	108.7	12	0:48	16:09.7	13
Taiga Onozawa	Boys' normal hill/6 km	85.0	108.4	14	0:49	16:49.4	16
Haruka Kasai	Girls' normal hill/4 km	76.0	104.7	10	1:06	13:08.2	9
Ayane Miyazaki	Girls' normal hill/4 km	84.0	120.0	3	0:20	11:48.8	2nd place, silver medalist(s)

== Short track speed skating ==
Three Japanese skaters achieved quota places for Japan based on the results of the 2019 World Junior Short Track Speed Skating Championships.

Boys

Athlete	Event	Heats		Quarterfinal		Semifinal		Final	
Athlete	Event	Time	Rank	Time	Rank	Time	Rank	Time	Rank
Kosei Hayashi	500 m	43.912	2 Q	42.878	4	Did not advance			14
Kosei Hayashi	1000 m	1:37.849	1 Q	1:31.554	2 Q	1:32.308	3 FB	1:36.969	8
Shogo Miyata	500 m	41.605	1 Q	41.662	1 Q	41.663	3 FB	42.386	6
Shogo Miyata	1000 m	DNF	4	Did not advance					32

Girls

Athlete	Event	Heats		Quarterfinal		Semifinal		Final	
Athlete	Event	Time	Rank	Time	Rank	Time	Rank	Time	Rank
Haruna Nagamori	500 m	45.501	2 Q	DQ		Did not advance			16
Haruna Nagamori	1000 m	1:47.696	1 Q	1:35.182	3	Did not advance			10

== Skeleton ==
Athlete	Event	Run 1		Run 2		Total	
Athlete	Event	Time	Rank	Time	Rank	Time	Rank
Taido Nagao	Boys'	1:13.13	17	1:17.35	19	2:30.48	19
Takanobu Usui	Boys'	1:10.29	5	1:09.67	5	2:19.96	5

== Ski jumping ==
Athlete	Event	First round			Final			Total	
Athlete	Event	Distance	Points	Rank	Distance	Points	Rank	Points	Rank
Sota Kudo	Boys' normal hill	DQ							
Yuna Kasai	Girls' normal hill	82.5	109.3	5	74.0	86.9	8	196.2	6
Machiko Kubota	Girls' normal hill	82.5	107.3	6	73.0	95.2	4	202.5	5
Ayane Miyazaki; Yuto Nishikata; Machiko Kubota; Sota Kudo	Mixed team	330.5	471.6	2	321.5	466.4	2	938.0	2nd place, silver medalist(s)

== Snowboarding ==
Snowboard cross

Athlete	Event	Group heats		Semifinal	Final
Athlete	Event	Points	Rank	Position	Position
Seigo Sato	Boys' snowboard cross	11	10	Did not advance	

Halfpipe, Slopestyle, & Big Air

Athlete	Event	Qualification				Final				
Athlete	Event	Run 1	Run 2	Best	Rank	Run 1	Run 2	Run 3	Best	Rank
Kaishu Hirano	Boys' halfpipe	84.66	23.00	84.66	3 Q	91.00	95.66	37.33	95.66	2nd place, silver medalist(s)
Ruka Hirano	Boys' halfpipe	93.00	97.33	97.33	1 Q	94.66	97.33	30.66	97.33	1st place, gold medalist(s)
Aoto Kawakami	Boys' big air	14.50	80.00	80.00	5 Q	79.25	96.00	95.75	191.75	2nd place, silver medalist(s)
Aoto Kawakami	Boys' slopestyle	77.66	89.33	89.33	1 Q	63.33	22.00	55.00	63.33	4
Ryoma Kimata	Boys' big air	95.75	36.50	95.75	1 Q	96.50	98.50	37.00	195.00	1st place, gold medalist(s)
Ryoma Kimata	Boys' slopestyle	32.33	35.66	35.66	15	Did not advance				
Hinari Asanuma	Girls' big air	76.00	74.33	76.00	3 Q	93.50	10.75	79.00	172.50	1st place, gold medalist(s)
Hinari Asanuma	Girls' slopestyle	47.00	75.00	75.00	4 Q	75.00	10.25	28.00	75.00	4
Manon Kaji	Girls' halfpipe	87.00	42.33	87.00	2 Q	85.33	41.00	31.66	85.33	2nd place, silver medalist(s)
Kanami Okuyama	Girls' big air	74.00	47.33	74.00	4 Q	76.25	16.00	23.50	99.75	6
Kanami Okuyama	Girls' slopestyle	49.50	64.25	64.25	5 Q	64.25	25.00	17.75	64.25	5
Mitsuki Ono	Girls' halfpipe	89.33	85.66	89.33	1 Q	91.33	88.33	95.33	95.33	1st place, gold medalist(s)

== Speed skating ==
Four Japanese skaters achieved quota places for Japan based on the results of the 2019 World Junior Speed Skating Championships.

Boys

Athlete	Event	Final	
Athlete	Event	Time	Rank
Motonaga Arito	500 m	38.31	13
Motonaga Arito	1500 m	1:52.24	1st place, gold medalist(s)
Yudai Yamamoto	500 m	36.42	1st place, gold medalist(s)
Yudai Yamamoto	1500 m	1:59.36	10

Girls

Athlete	Event	Final	
Athlete	Event	Time	Rank
Yuka Takahashi	500 m	42.21	10
Yuka Takahashi	1500 m	2:10.58	2nd place, silver medalist(s)
Yukino Yoshida	500 m	41.16	3rd place, bronze medalist(s)
Yukino Yoshida	1500 m	2:17.054	9

Mass Start

Athlete	Event	Semifinal			Final		
Athlete	Event	Points	Time	Rank	Points	Time	Rank
Motonaga Arito	Boys' mass start	31	5:53.77	1 Q	30	6:29.72	1st place, gold medalist(s)
Yudai Yamamoto	Boys' mass start	3	6:36.80	5 Q	1	6:49.70	10
Yuka Takahashi	Girls' mass start	20	6:13.86	2 Q	4	6:51.07	5
Yukino Yoshida	Girls' mass start	4	6:50.83	4 Q	0	6:57.26	14

Mixed

Athlete	Event	Time	Rank
Team 3 Sini Siro (FIN); Yukino Yoshida (JPN); Ignaz Gschwentner (AUT); Alexander Sergeev (RUS)	Mixed team sprint	2:04.10	1st place, gold medalist(s)
Team 7 Varvara Bandaryna (BLR); Myrthe de Boer (NED); Lukáš Šteklý (CZE); Yudai Yamamoto (JPN)	Mixed team sprint	2:06.80	5
Team 10; Marta Dobrowolska (POL); Yuka Takahashi (JPN); Michał Kopacz (POL); Park Sang-eon (KOR)	Mixed team sprint	2:08.62	10
Team 16; Laura Kivioja (FIN); Daria Kopacz (POL); Theo Collins (GBR); Motonaga Arito (JPN)	Mixed team sprint	2:05.92	2nd place, silver medalist(s)

== See also ==
- Japan at the 2020 Summer Olympics
