= Mani Cooper =

British ski jumper

Mani Cooper (born 6 June 2003) is Britain's first female Olympic ski jumper.

== Career ==
Cooper competes in Nordic Combined events. She is the women's British ski jumping record holder, having jumped 77m in the FIS Alpen Cup at Seefeld, Austria on 20 December 2019. Cooper finished 19th at the 2020 Winter Youth Olympics and 32nd at the 2020 FIS Junior World Ski Championships at Oberwiesenthal, Germany.

Cooper is a member of Great Britain's national ski jumping squad and is based in Tyrol, Austria.
