= Jessica Malsiner =

Italian ski jumper

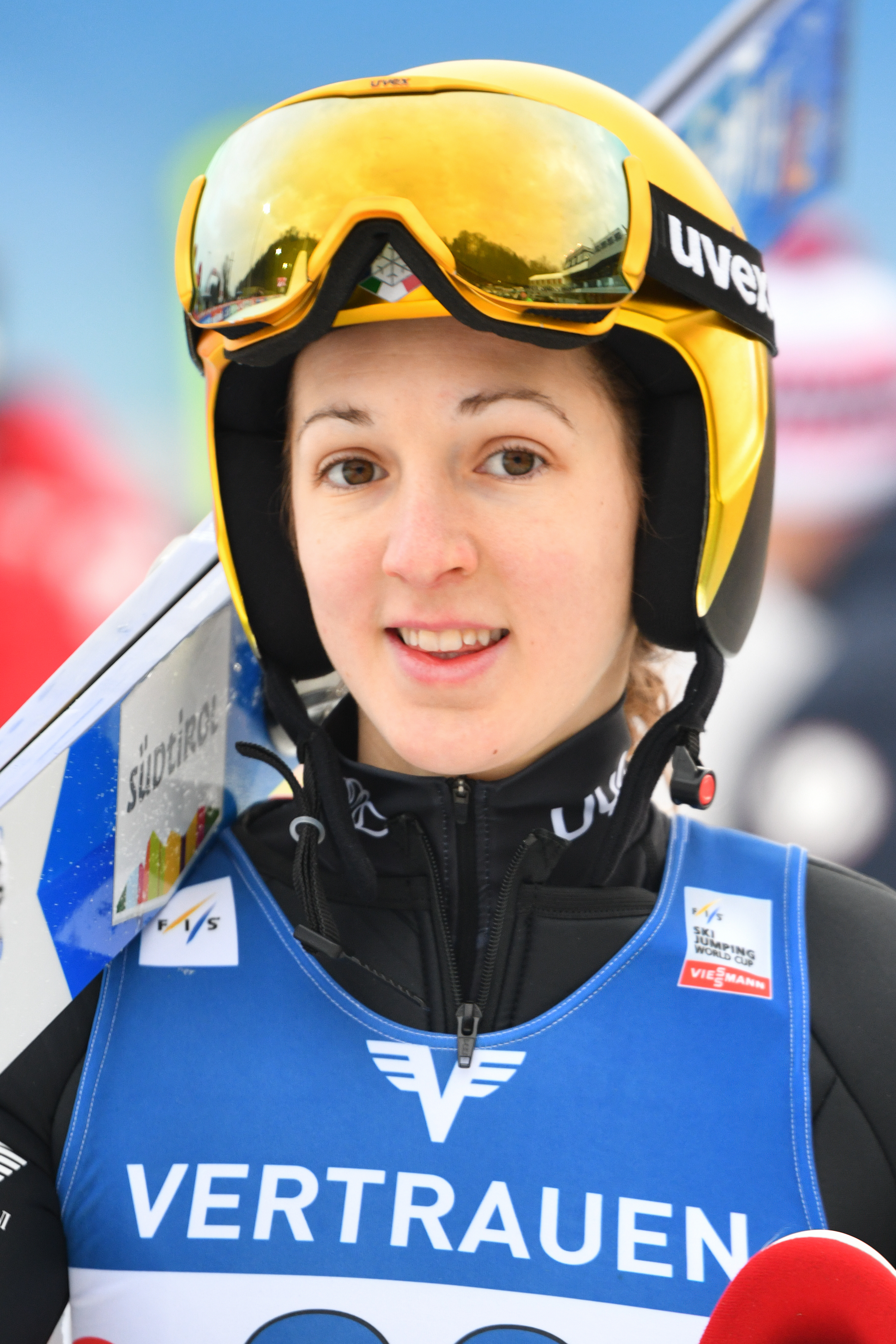
- Jessica in 2023

Personal information
- Full name: Jessica Malsiner
- Nationality: Italian
- Born: September 23, 2002 (age 23) Sterzing, Italy
- Occupation: Ski jumper
- Relatives: Manuela Malsiner (sister); Lara Malsiner (sister)

Sport
- Country: Italy
- Sport: Ski jumping
- Events: Normal hill, Large hill
- Club: Gruppi Sportivi Fiamme Gialle
Achievements and titles
Women's ski jumping
Representing Italy
Winter Youth Olympics
Bronze medal – third place	2020 Lausanne	Nordic mixed team
- Updated on 21 May 2026

Jessica Malsiner (born 23 September 2002) is an Italian ski jumper. She represented Italy at the 2022 and 2026 Winter Olympics.

== Biography ==
Born in Sterzing, she began her competitive career with the Sci Club Gardena, club located in the town of Santa Cristina Gherdëina. She later moved to Gruppi Sportivi Fiamme Gialle to continue her training.

She represented Italy at the 2020 Winter Youth Olympic, held in Switzerland. She competed in three events at the Games. In the mixed team event, alongside Annika Sieff, Stefano Radovan, and Daniel Moroder, they finished in ninth place. In the individual event, she also finished in ninth place. In the Nordic mixed team normal hill/4 × 3.3 km event, he won the bronze medal alongside Annika Sieff, Stefano Radovan, and Mattia Galiani.

She was a member of the Italian delegation to the 2022 Winter Olympics, held in Beijing, China. She competed in only one event, the women's individual, where she finished in 29th place. She went on to represent Italy again at the 2026 Winter Olympics, held in Italy. In the normal hill event, she finished in 39th place. In the large hill event, however, she performed better, finishing in thirty-first place.

== Personal life ==
She is the younger sister of Manuela and Lara, who are also international-level ski jumpers.
