= Johanna Bassani =

Austrian Nordic combined skier (2002–2020)

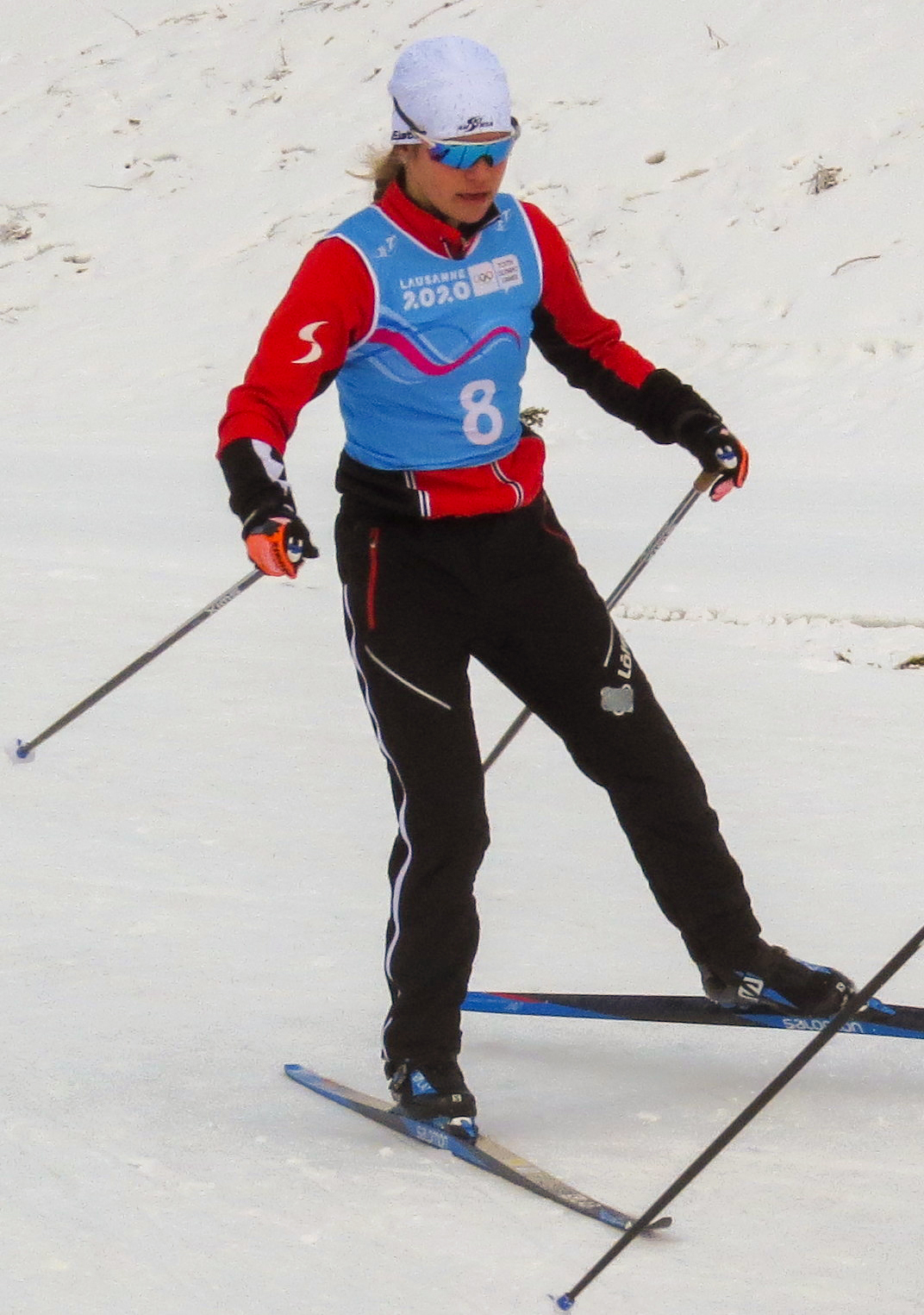
- Bassani in January 2020
- Born: 25 April 2002; Vöcklabruck, Austria
- Died: 5 May 2020 (aged 18)
- Occupation: Skier

Johanna Bassani (25 April 2002 – 5 May 2020) was an Austrian combined Nordic skier and ski jumper.

== Career ==
Bassani was born on 25 April 2002. She began her career with the team UVB Hinzenbach, winning the championship in her hometown of Attnang-Puchheim at the age of twelve. She began ski jumping at age 16 in Eisenerz. Bassani made her international debut at the 2018 OPA Nordic Ski Games in Planica, where she finished sixth in the individual competition and third with the Austrian national team. She would also participate in the FIS Ski Jumping World Cup and the Nordic Combined Alpine Cup. She took part in the 2019 OPA Nordic Ski Games and again finished third with the national team.

In her debut at the Summer Grand Prix in 2019, Bassani finished 18th. In October 2019, she won the silver medal at the Austrian national Nordic combined championships. Afterwards, she focused on the 2020 Winter Youth Olympics in Lausanne with Nordic combined. After finishing eighth in the Gundersen individual event, Bassani competed with the Austrian Nordic combined team, winning the silver medal. Following the 2nd-place finish, she was personally congratulated by her hometown mayor. She then finished 11th at the 2020 Nordic Combined Continental Cup in Eisenerz. She was named to the Austrian national team for the 2020 Nordic Junior World Ski Championships in Oberwiesenthal. She died unexpectedly two months later.
