= Annika Sieff =

Italian ski jumper (born 2003)

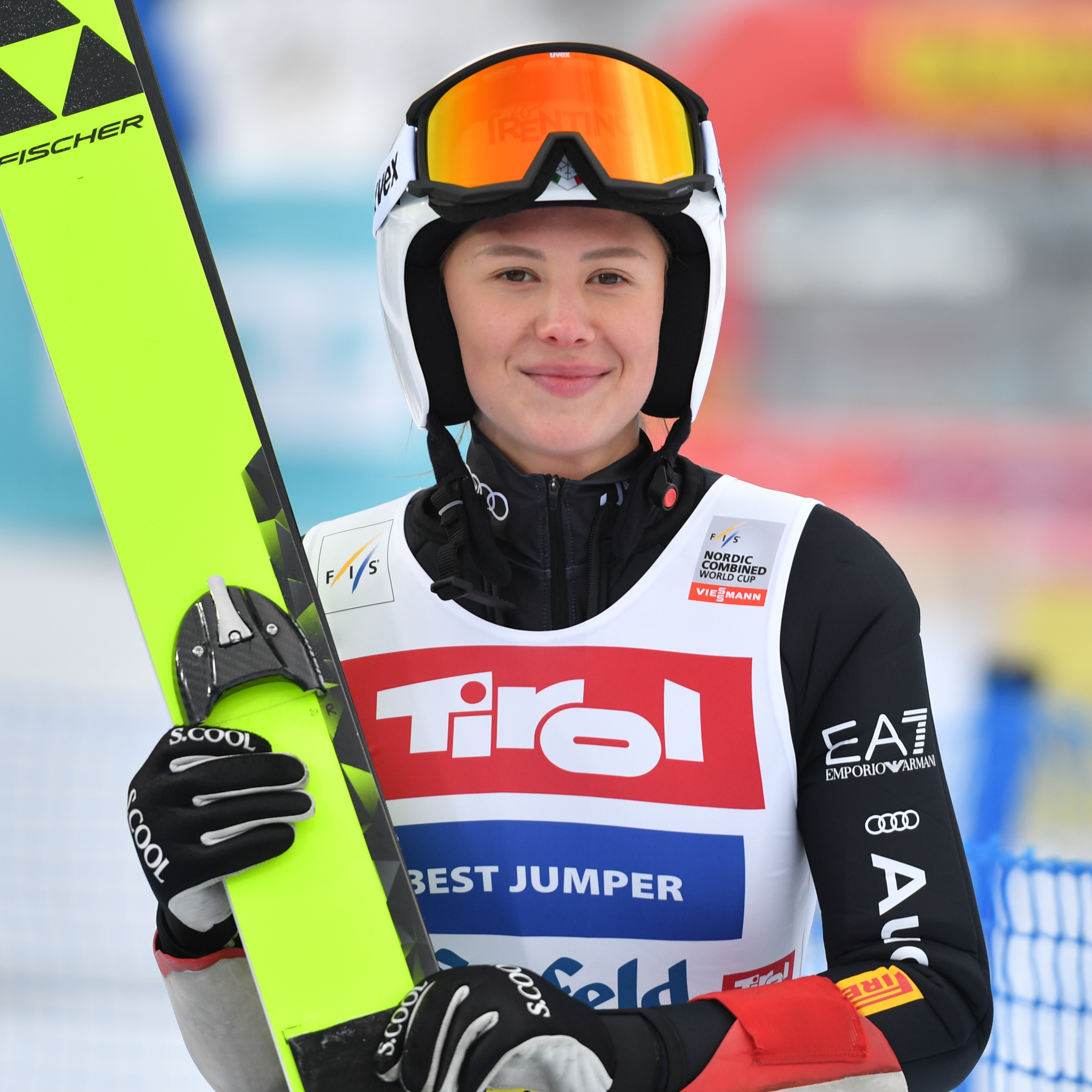
- Sieff in 2023

Personal information
- Born: 27 October 2003 (age 22) Cavalese, Italy

Sport
- Sport: Skiing
Medal record
Representing Italy
Women's Nordic combined
World Junior Championships
Gold medal – first place	2022 Zakopane	Individual NH
Gold medal – first place	2023 Whistler	Individual NH
Silver medal – second place	2022 Zakopane	Mixed team NH
Bronze medal – third place	2021 Lahti	Mixed team NH
Bronze medal – third place	2023 Whistler	Mixed team NH
Winter Youth Olympics
Bronze medal – third place	2020 Lausanne	Mixed team NH

Annika Sieff (born 27 October 2003) is an Italian ski jumper and former Nordic combined skier.

== Career ==
Sieff represented Italy at the 2020 Winter Youth Olympics and won a bronze medal in the mixed team normal hill event. During the 2021–22 FIS Nordic Combined World Cup, she won the first Provisional Competition Rounds (PCR) of the season on 2 December 2021. The next day she earned her first career World Cup podium, finishing in third place. She became the first Italian woman to podium at the World Cup.

In March 2022, she competed at the 2022 Nordic Junior World Ski Championships and won a gold medal in the individual normal hill. Weeks later she competed at the 2022 European Youth Olympic Winter Festival in Nordic combined and won a gold medal in the individual normal hill event.

She again competed at the 2023 Nordic Junior World Ski Championships and won a gold medal in the individual normal hill. She also won a bronze medal in the mixed team normal hill event. During the 2023–24 season, she switched from Nordic combined to ski jumping. During the 2023–24 FIS Ski Jumping Inter-Continental Cup, she won the summer overall, finishing with 360 points.

In January 2026, she was selected to represent Italy at the 2026 Winter Olympics. During the normal hill event she finished in 19th place. She also competed in the mixed team event and finished in tenth place.
