= Italy at the 2020 Winter Youth Olympics =

- IOC code: ITA
- NOC: Italian National Olympic Committee
- Website: www.coni.it

in Lausanne
- Competitors: 67
- Medals Ranked 12th: Gold 2 Silver 3 Bronze 3 Total 8

Winter Youth Olympics appearances
- 2012; 2016; 2020; 2024

Italy competed at the 2020 Winter Youth Olympics in Lausanne, Switzerland from 9 to 22 January 2020.

== Medalists ==
Medals awarded to participants of mixed-NOC teams are represented in italics. These medals are not counted towards the individual NOC medal tally.

Medal	Name	Sport	Event	Date
Gold	Rocco Baldini	Ski mountaineering	Boys' sprint	13 January
Gold	Martina Trabucchi; Linda Zingerle; Nicolò Betemps; Marco Barale	Biathlon	Mixed relay	15 January
Gold	Alessandro Segafredo	Ice hockey	Boys' 3x3 mixed tournament	15 January
Gold	Elisa Innocenti	Ice hockey	Girls' 3x3 mixed tournament	15 January
Silver	Linda Zingerle; Marco Barale	Biathlon	Single mixed relay	12 January
Silver	Silvia Berra	Ski mountaineering	Girls' sprint	13 January
Silver	Luca Tomasoni	Ski mountaineering	Boys' sprint	13 January
Silver	Carlotta Regine	Ice hockey	Girls' 3x3 mixed tournament	15 January
Bronze	Edoardo Saracco	Alpine skiing	Boys' slalom	14 January
Bronze	Katia Filippi	Speed skating	Girls' mass start	16 January
Bronze	Annika Sieff; Stefano Radovan; Jessica Malsiner; Mattia Galiani	Nordic combined	Mixed team normal hill/4 × 3.3 km	22 January

== Alpine skiing ==
Boys

Athlete	Event	Run 1		Run 2		Total	
Athlete	Event	Time	Rank	Time	Rank	Time	Rank
Marco Abbruzzese	Super-G	—N/a				55.52	15
Marco Abbruzzese	Combined	55.52	15	DNF			
Marco Abbruzzese	Giant slalom	1:05.32	18	1:05.78	16	2:11.10	15
Marco Abbruzzese	Slalom						
Gian Maria Illariuzzi	Super-G	—N/a				55.61	16
Gian Maria Illariuzzi	Combined	55.61	16	DNF			
Gian Maria Illariuzzi	Giant slalom	DNF					
Gian Maria Illariuzzi	Slalom						
Edoardo Saracco	Super-G	—N/a				56.86	30
Edoardo Saracco	Combined	56.86	30	33.67	4	1:30.53	12
Edoardo Saracco	Giant slalom	1:05.06	13	1:04.88	7	2:09.94	9
Edoardo Saracco	Slalom						

Girls

Athlete	Event	Run 1		Run 2		Total	
Athlete	Event	Time	Rank	Time	Rank	Time	Rank
Annette Belfrond	Super-G	—N/a				58.08	23
Annette Belfrond	Combined	58.08	23	DNF			
Annette Belfrond	Giant slalom	1:08.69	28	1:04.34	11	2:13.03	17
Annette Belfrond	Slalom						
Alica Calaba	Super-G	—N/a				56.75	6
Alica Calaba	Combined	56.75	6	40.10	20	1:36.85	14
Alica Calaba	Giant slalom	1:06.26	11	1:04.23	10	2:10.49	10
Alica Calaba	Slalom						
Sophie Mathiou	Super-G	—N/a				57.29	12
Sophie Mathiou	Combined	57.29	12	37.80	5	1:35.09	5
Sophie Mathiou	Giant slalom	1:06.22	10	1:04.22	9	2:10.44	9
Sophie Mathiou	Slalom						

== Biathlon ==
Boys

Athlete	Event	Time	Misses	Rank
Marco Barale	Sprint	20:00.6	3 (1+2)	6
Marco Barale	Individual	37:59.2	7 (1+3+2+1)	22
Nicolò Betemps	Sprint	22:00.0	5 (2+3)	37
Nicolò Betemps	Individual	39:27.2	8 (4+1+2+1)	43
Daniel Oberegger	Sprint	23:24.1	6 (3+3)	67
Daniel Oberegger	Individual	41:15.8	9 (2+3+1+3)	62
Philipp Tumler	Sprint	22:58.5	6 (3+3)	58
Philipp Tumler	Individual	38:59.6	5 (0+3+0+2)	38

Girls

Athlete	Event	Time	Misses	Rank
Martina Giordano	Sprint	20:44.8	1 (0+1)	39
Martina Giordano	Individual	35:31.8	2 (0+1+0+1)	13
Sara Scattolo	Sprint	20:48.5	3 (1+2)	42
Sara Scattolo	Individual	37:54.2	6 (1+2+1+2)	35
Martina Trabucchi	Sprint	20:44.1	3 (2+1)	35
Martina Trabucchi	Individual	34:11.1	2 (0+2+0+0)	4
Linda Zingerle	Sprint	19:53.0	3 (1+2)	15
Linda Zingerle	Individual	35:25.7	6 (1+1+2+2)	10

Mixed

Athletes	Event	Time	Misses	Rank
Linda Zingerle; Marco Barale	Single mixed relay	42:23.0	2+16	2nd place, silver medalist(s)
	Mixed relay			

== Curling ==
Italy qualified a mixed team of four athletes.

Mixed team

Team	Event	Group stage						Quarterfinal	Semifinal	Final / BM	
Team	Event	Opposition Score	Opposition Score	Opposition Score	Opposition Score	Opposition Score	Rank	Opposition Score	Opposition Score	Opposition Score	Rank
Marta Lo Deserto; Francesco De Zanna; Federica Ghedina; Simone Piffer	Mixed team	United States; W 7 – 3	Sweden; W 7 – 3	Latvia; W 10 – 7	Japan; W 7 – 6	Czech Republic; L 2 – 6	1 Q	Norway; L 6 – 8	Did not advance		5

Mixed doubles

Athletes	Event	Round of 48	Round of 24	Round of 12	Round of 6	Semifinals	Final / BM	
Athletes	Event	Opposition Result	Opposition Result	Opposition Result	Opposition Result	Opposition Result	Opposition Result	Rank
	Mixed doubles							

== Figure skating ==
Five Italian figure skaters achieved quota places for Italy based on the results of the 2019 World Junior Figure Skating Championships.

Singles

Athlete	Event	SP		FS		Total	
Athlete	Event	Points	Rank	Points	Rank	Points	Rank
	Boys' singles						
	Girls' singles						

Couples

Athletes	Event	SP/SD		FS/FD		Total	
Athletes	Event	Points	Rank	Points	Rank	Points	Rank
	Ice dancing						

== Short track speed skating ==
Two Italian skaters achieved quota places for Italy based on the results of the 2019 World Junior Short Track Speed Skating Championships.

Boys

Athlete	Event	Quarterfinal		Semifinal		Final	
Athlete	Event	Time	Rank	Time	Rank	Time	Rank
	500 m						
	1000 m						

Girls

Athlete	Event	Quarterfinal		Semifinal		Final	
Athlete	Event	Time	Rank	Time	Rank	Time	Rank
	500 m						
	1000 m						

== Speed skating ==
One Italian skaters achieved quota places for Italy based on the results of the 2019 World Junior Speed Skating Championships.

Boys

Athlete	Event	Race 1		Race 2		Final	
Athlete	Event	Time	Rank	Time	Rank	Time	Rank
	500 m						
	1500 m	—N/a					
	Mass start	—N/a					

== See also ==
- Italy at the 2020 Summer Olympics
