= Ice hockey at the 2020 Winter Youth Olympics =

Ice hockey at the III Winter Youth Olympic Games
- Venue: Vaudoise Aréna
- Dates: 10–22 January
- Competitors: 399 from 45 nations

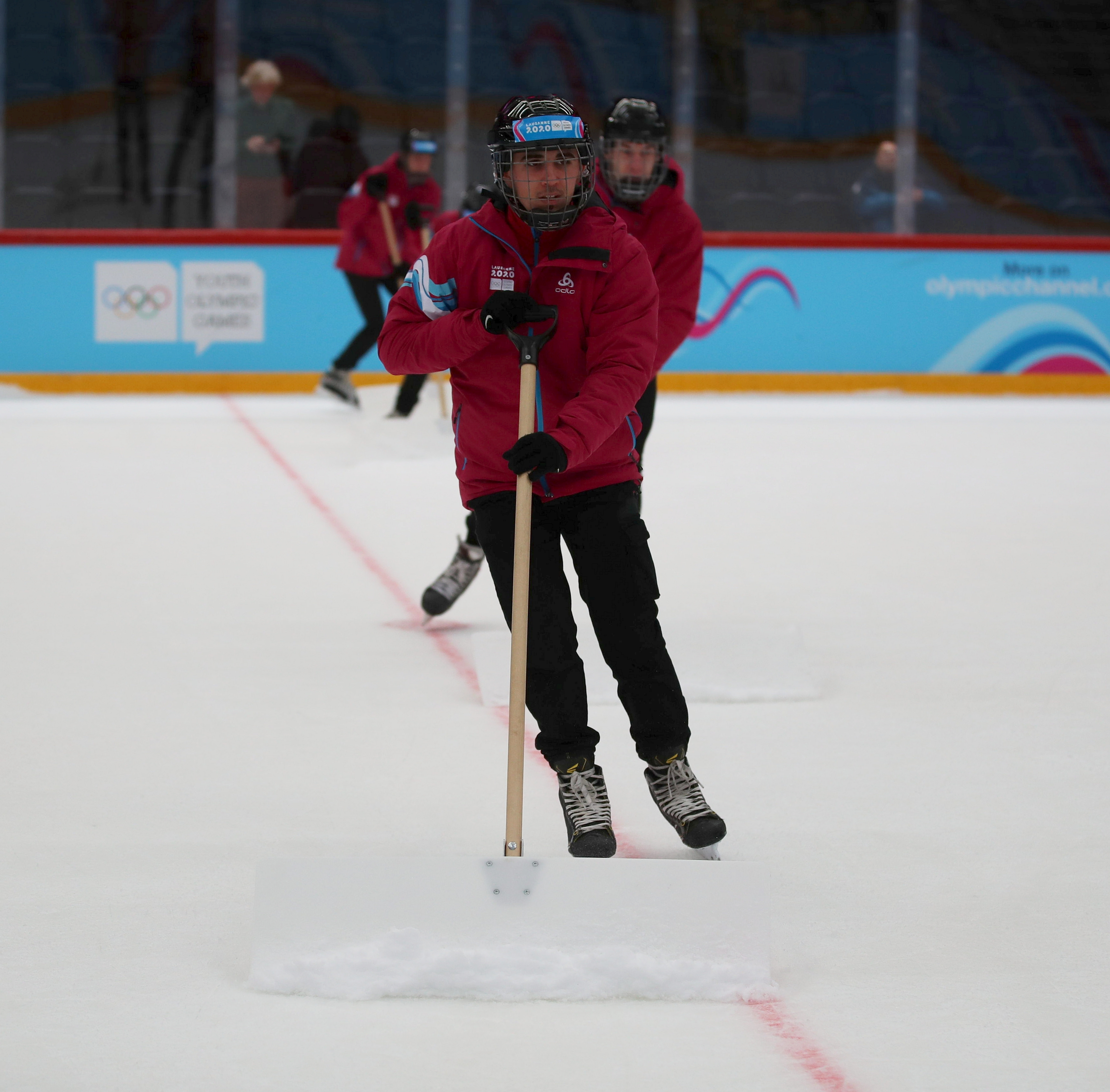
Human preparation of the ice

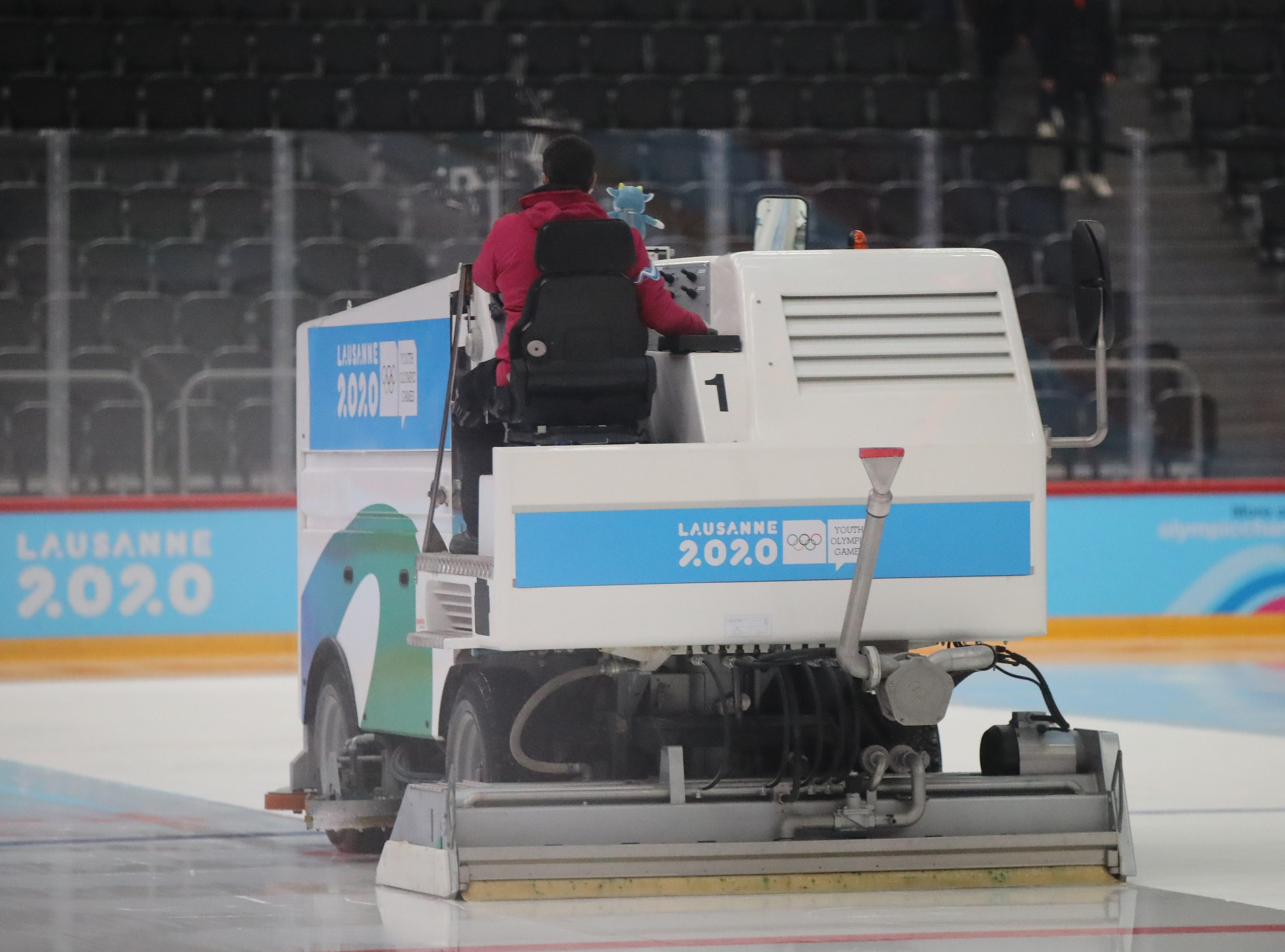
Use of zambonis for preparation of the ice

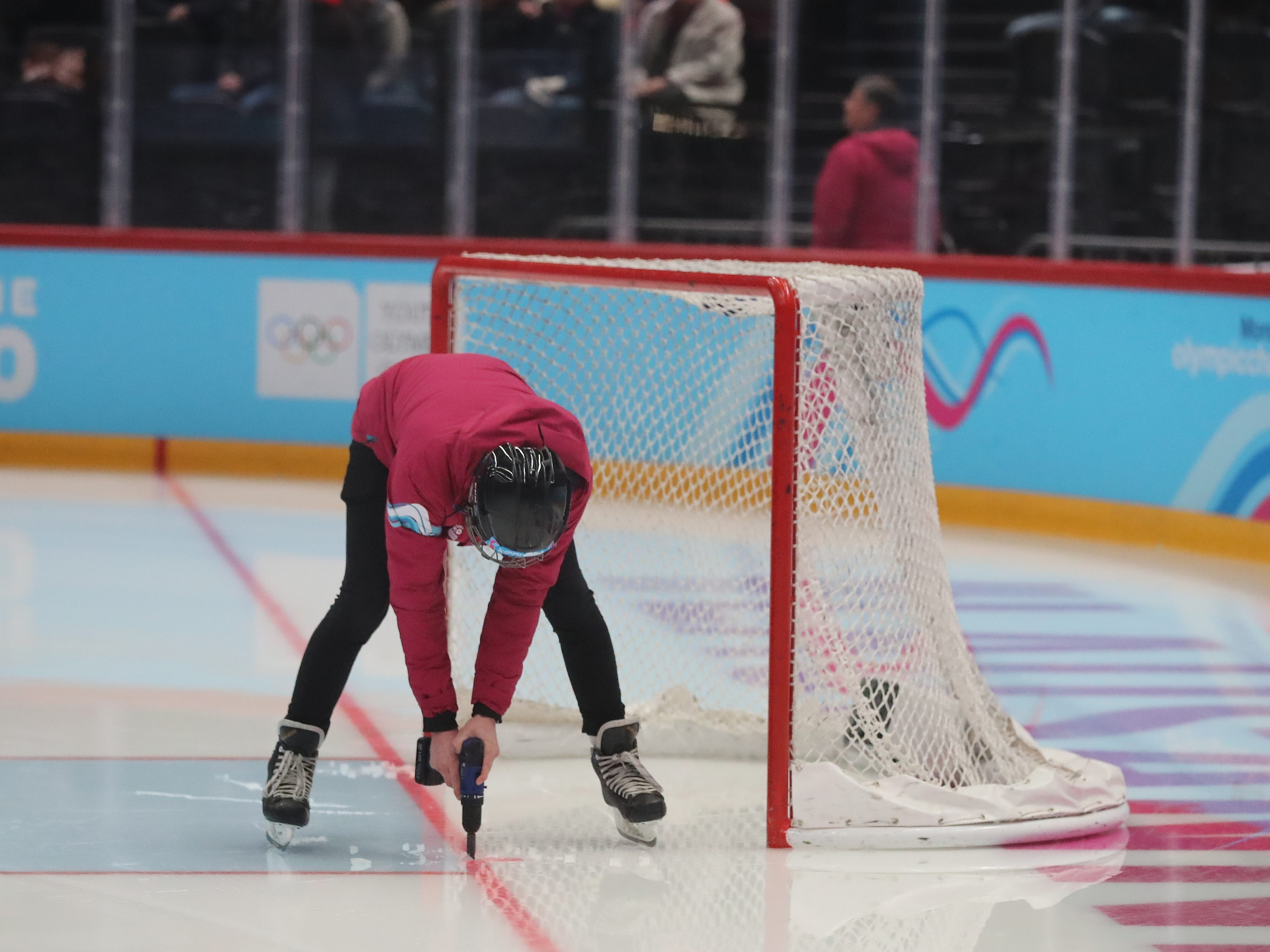
Preparation of the goal

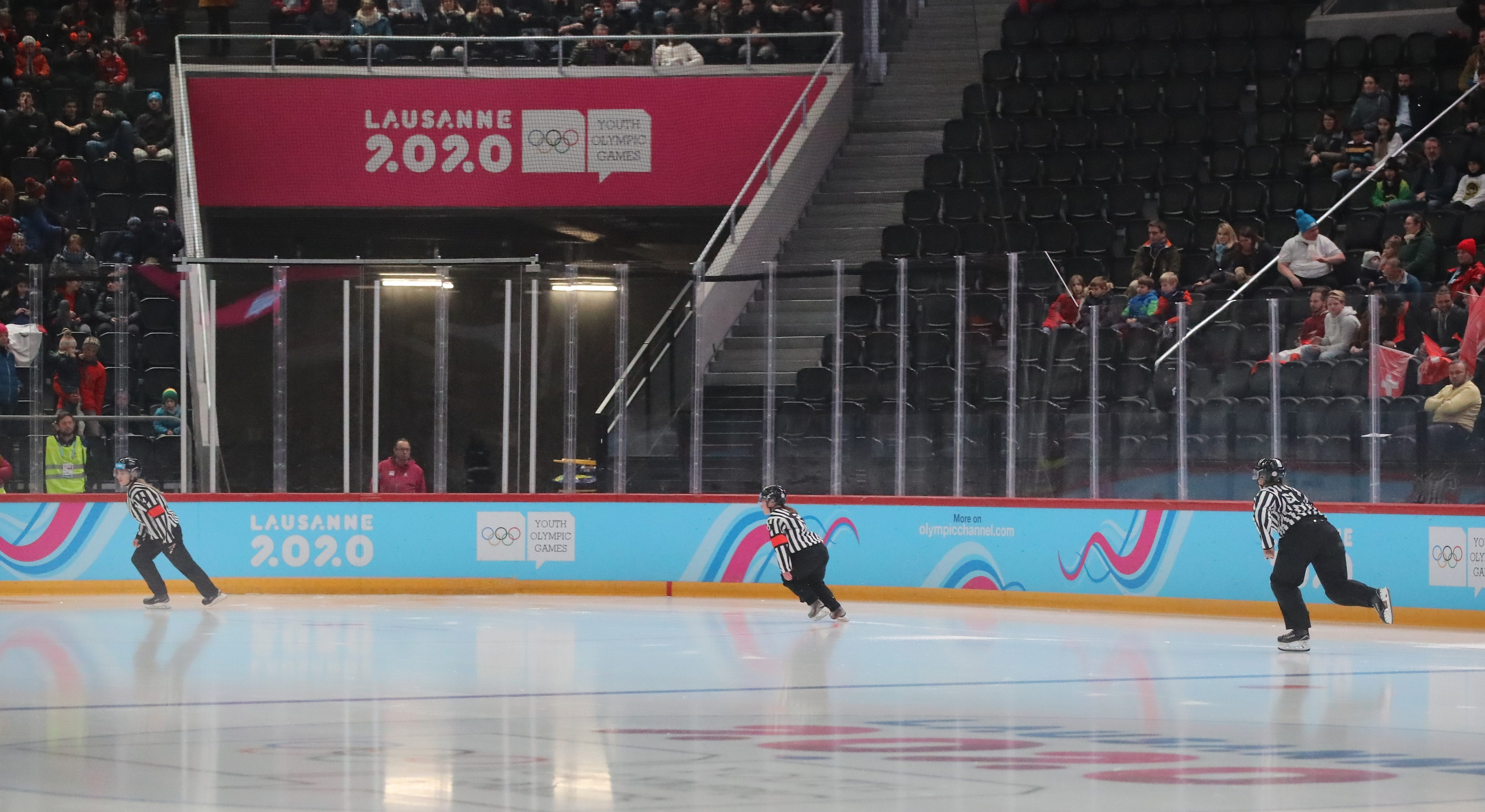
Walk-in of the referees

Ice hockey at the 2020 Winter Youth Olympics took place at the Vaudoise Aréna in Lausanne, Switzerland from 10 to 22 January 2020.

A total of four events were contested: a men's and women's tournament (six teams per gender), alongside a mixed 3x3 tournament for each gender. The 3x3 competition replaced the skills challenge that was held in the first two editions. A country could enter a maximum of 26 athletes (17 for the team tournament, plus 4 in the boys' 3x3 tournament and 5 in the girl's 3x3 tournament). Hosts Switzerland were permitted to enter in each event, meaning the NOC could enter 43 athletes.

== Medal summary ==
=== Medal table ===
Rank	Nation	Gold	Silver	Bronze	Total
–	Mixed-NOCs	2	2	2	6
1	Japan	1	0	0	1
1	Russia	1	0	0	1
3	Sweden	0	1	0	1
3	United States	0	1	0	1
5	Canada	0	0	1	1
5	Slovakia	0	0	1	1
Totals (6 entries)		4	4	4	12

=== Medalists ===
Event	Gold	Silver	Bronze
Boys' tournament	Russia; Danila Byzov; Kirill Dolzhenkov; Artyom Duda; Danil Grigoriev; Mikhail Gulyayev; Sergei Ivanov; Kirill Kudryavtsev; Ilya Kvochko; Vyacheslav Malov; Andrei Malyavin; Matvei Michkov; Ivan Miroshnichenko; Sergei Murashov; Ilya Rogovski; Nikita Ryzhov; Adel Safin; Vladislav Sapunov	United States; Vinny Borgesi; Gavin Brindley; Hunter Brzustewicz; Seamus Casey; Ryan Chesley; Tyler Duke; Maddox Fleming; Cutter Gauthier; Isaac Howard; Lane Hutson; Cruz Lucius; Rutger McGroarty; Frank Nazar; Dylan Silverstein; Arthur Smith; Jimmy Snuggerud; Charlie Stramel	Canada; Justin Côté; Nate Danielson; Kocha Delic; Dylan Ernst; Adam Fantilli; Vincent Filion; Panayioti Fimis; Cédrick Guindon; Matthew Jovanovic; Mats Lindgren; Paul Ludwinski; Tristan Luneau; Denton Mateychuk; Ty Nelson; Matthew Savoie; Antonin Verreault; Noah Warren
Boys' 3x3 mixed tournament	Team Green (MIX); Nicolas Elgas (LUX); Artyom Pronichkin (RUS); Nathan Nicoud (FRA); Volodymyr Troshkin (UKR); Pablo González (ESP); Maks Perčič (SLO); Yam Yau (HKG); Alessandro Segafredo (ITA); Marek Potšinok (EST); Patrik Dalen (NOR); Ilya Korzun (BLR); Levente Hegedűs (HUN); Štěpán Maleček (CZE)	Team Red (MIX); Juho Lukkari (FIN); Denis Pasko (UKR); Lin Wei-yu (TPE); Aleks Menc (POL); Matija Dinić (SRB); Peter Repčík (SVK); Mackenzie Stewart (GBR); Dylan Wesseling (NED); Tjaš Lesničar (SLO); Sander Salvær (NOR); Jan Hornecker (SUI); Matthias Bittner (GER); Maël Halladj (FRA)	Team Brown (MIX); Luka Banek (CRO); Sai Lake (AUS); Hugo Galvez (FRA); Elvis Hsu (HKG); Axel Ruski-Jones (NZL); Marlon D'Acunto (GER); Erik Potšinok (EST); Evan Nauth (GBR); Artur Seniut (LTU); Matyáš Šapovaliv (CZE); Milán Ivády (HUN); Rastislav Eliáš (SVK); Sebastian Aarsund (NOR)
Girls' tournament	Japan; Yumeka Chujo; Yuzuyu Fujii; Nao Fukuda; Komomo Ito; Makoto Ito; Minami Kamada; Kaaya Komoto; Nagomi Murakami; Rio Noro; Riri Noro; Reina Sato; Hina Shimomukai; An Shinoda; Himari Suzuki; Masaki Tanabe; Kyoka Tsutsumi; Harua Umemori	Sweden; Linnea Adelbertson; Anna Andersson; Pusle Dyring-Andersen; Nicole Hall; Beatrice Hjälm; Ella Jämsén; Tuva Kandell; Ida Karlsson; Klara Kenttälä; Olivia Klaar; Pandora Nåtby; Tindra Oknefjell; Julia Perjus; Linnéa Pettersson Dove; Frida Simonsen; Ebba Svensson Träff; Alice Wallin	Slovakia; Tereza Belková; Zuzana Dobiášová; Emma Donovalová; Hana Fančovičová; Lea Giertlová; Lea Glosíková; Nina Hudáková; Laura Jancsóová; Nikola Janeková; Barbora Kapičáková; Viktória Kučerová; Simona Macková; Laura Medviďová; Mária Nemčeková; Kristína Slováková; Lily Stern; Emma Bianka Živčáková
Girls' 3x3 mixed tournament	Team Yellow (MIX); Anke Steeno (BEL); Eva Aizpurua (ESP); Ludmilla Bourcet (FRA); Elisa Innocenti (ITA); Katya Blong (NZL); Iris van Houten (NED); Zuzana Trnková (CZE); Luisa Wilson (MEX); Shin Seo-yoon (KOR); Leonie Böttcher (GER); Nora Pollestad (NOR); Nubya Aeschlimann (SUI); Magdalena Luggin (AUT)	Team Black (MIX); Angelina Hurschler (SUI); Courtney Mahoney (AUS); Zhang Xinyue (CHN); Chang En-ni (TPE); Alicja Mota (POL); Nikola Janeková (SVK); Amy Robery (GBR); Daria Petrova (RUS); Kimberly Collard (NED); Luca Márton (HUN); Reina Sato (JPN); Emilia Kyrkkö (FIN); Carlotta Regine (ITA)	Team Blue (MIX); Sidre Özer (TUR); Valerie Christmann (SUI); Anna Kot (POL); Maria Runevska (BUL); Mirren Foy (GBR); Zuzana Dobiašová (SVK); Yana Krasheninina (RUS); Maya Stober (GER); Regina Metzler (HUN); Karolina Hengelmüller (AUT); Nikki Sharp (AUS); Yuna Kusama (JPN); Aya Juhl Petersen (DEN)

== Qualification ==
=== Summary ===
Nation	Men		Women		Total athletes
Nation	Tournament	3x3	Tournament	3x3	Total athletes
Argentina		1		2	3
Australia		2		4	6
Austria		4		5	9
Belarus		4			4
Belgium		1		1	2
Bulgaria		1		1	2
Canada	17				17
China		1		4	5
Croatia		1			1
Czech Republic		4	17	5	23
Denmark	17	1		1	19
Estonia		3			3
Finland	17	2		1	20
France		4		4	8
Germany		4	17	5	21
Great Britain		3		4	7
Hong Kong		2			2
Hungary		4		5	9
Italy		4		5	9
Japan		4	17	5	25
Kazakhstan		1		1	2
Latvia				1	1
Lithuania		3			3
Luxembourg		1		1	2
Mexico		3		3	6
Netherlands		3		4	7
New Zealand		3		2	5
Norway		4		4	8
Poland		3		3	6
Qatar		1			1
Romania		1		2	3
Russia	17	4		5	26
Serbia		1		1	2
Singapore		1			1
Slovakia		4	17	5	22
Slovenia		3		1	4
South Korea		3		4	7
Spain		3		4	7
Sweden		1	17	1	19
Switzerland	17	4	17	5	43
Chinese Taipei		2		3	5
Turkey		2		1	3
Turkmenistan		1			1
Ukraine		2		1	3
United States	17				17
Total: 45 NOCs	102	104	102	104	399

=== Team tournament ===
The top ten NOC's ranked in the combined ranking from the 2018 and 2019 editions of the IIHF World U18 Championships and IIHF World Women's U18 Championships will be allowed to enter a boys' or girls' team, with the top ranked country choosing first and so on. Each country can only enter one team, with the exception being hosts, Switzerland, which can enter a team in both tournaments. Each team will consist of 17 players.

Ranking

Rank	Team	Men		Women		Total points	Tournament selected	
Rank	Team	2018	2019	2018	2019	Total points	Boys'	Girls'
1	United States	24	23	25	24	96	Yes	
2	Sweden	23	25	24	21	93		Yes
3	Canada	21	22	23	25	91	Yes	
4	Russia	20	24	22	22	88	Yes	
5	Finland	25	19	21	23	88	Yes	
6	Czech Republic	22	20	20	19	81		Yes
7	Switzerland	17	17	19	20	73	Yes	Yes
8	Slovakia	19	16	16	17	68		Yes
9	Germany	14	15	18	16	63		Yes
10	Japan	7	9	17	18	51		Yes
11	Denmark	13	13	11	13	50	Yes	

=== 3x3 ===
The top 15 countries in each respective (and hosts Switzerland), will be allowed to enter one goaltender each. Each team will consist of 13 players (2 goaltenders and 11 players). Each nation can enter a maximum of three players for the boys' competition and four for the girls'. The host nation Switzerland has been allocated the maximum quota. Each NOC (that organizes a skills challenge competition) will be allocated one quota spot. All other spots will be awarded using a ranking list of all athletes that contested the skills competition across all countries, respecting the maximum quota per NOC.

==== Men ====
The final quotas were released on November 1, 2019.

Event	Quotas	NOC's
Goaltenders	1	~~United States~~; Sweden; ~~Canada~~; Russia; Finland; Czech Republic; Switzerland; Slovakia; Germany; Japan; Denmark; France; Norway; Austria; Hungary; Italy; Belarus; Kazakhstan
Skills Challenge	3	Austria; Belarus; Czech Republic; Estonia; France; Germany; Great Britain; Hungary; Italy; Japan; Lithuania; Mexico; Netherlands; New Zealand; Norway; Poland; Russia; Slovakia; Slovenia; South Korea; Spain; Switzerland
Skills Challenge	2	Australia; Hong Kong; Chinese Taipei; Turkey; Ukraine
Skills Challenge	1	Argentina; Belgium; Bulgaria; China; Croatia; Finland; Luxembourg; Qatar; Romania; Serbia; Singapore; Turkmenistan
Total	104	

==== Women ====
The final quotas were released on November 1, 2019.

Event	Quotas	NOC's
Goaltenders	1	~~United States~~; Sweden; ~~Canada~~; Russia; Finland; Czech Republic; Switzerland; Slovakia; Germany; Japan; Denmark; France; Norway; Austria; Hungary; Italy; ~~Belarus~~; Kazakhstan; Latvia
Skills Challenge	4	Australia; Austria; China; Czech Republic; France; Germany; Great Britain; Hungary; Italy; Japan; Netherlands; Russia; Slovakia; South Korea; Spain; Switzerland
Skills Challenge	3	Mexico; Norway; Poland; Chinese Taipei
Skills Challenge	2	Argentina; New Zealand; Romania
Skills Challenge	1	Belgium; Bulgaria; Luxembourg; Slovenia; Serbia; Turkey; Ukraine
Total	104	
