= New Zealand at the 2020 Winter Youth Olympics =

- IOC code: NZL
- NOC: New Zealand Olympic Committee
- Website: www.olympic.org.nz

in Lausanne
- Competitors: 20 in 9 sports
- Flag bearer (opening): Campbell Wright
- Flag bearer (closing): Luca Harrington
- Medals Ranked =29th: Gold 0 Silver 0 Bronze 1 Total 1

Winter Youth Olympics appearances
- 2012; 2016; 2020; 2024

New Zealand competed at the 2020 Winter Youth Olympics in Lausanne, Switzerland, from 9 to 22 January 2020. They were represented by a team of 20 athletes, who took part in nine sports. The chef de mission was Jesse Teat. The flagbearer at the opening ceremony was biathlon athlete and cross-country skier Campbell Wright, and freestyle skier Luca Harrington was the flagbearer at the closing ceremony.

== Medallists ==
Medals awarded to New Zealand participants in mixed-NOC team events are represented in italics. These medals do not count towards the New Zealand NOC medal tally.

Medal	Name	Sport	Event	Date
Gold	Katya Blong	Ice hockey	Girls' 3x3 mixed NOC tournament	15 January
Bronze	Axel Ruski-Jones	Ice hockey	Boys' 3x3 mixed NOC tournament	15 January
Bronze	Luca Harrington	Freestyle skiing	Boys' halfpipe	21 January
Bronze	Ethan De Rose	Short track speed skating	Mixed NOC team relay	22 January

== Alpine skiing ==
Athlete	Event	Run 1		Run 2		Total	
Athlete	Event	Time	Rank	Time	Rank	Time	Rank
Katie Crawford	Girls' slalom	1:00.56	38	51.50	28	1:52.06	31
Katie Crawford	Girls' giant slalom	1:12.58	41	1:10.67	30	2:23.25	30
Harrison Messenger	Boys' slalom	DNF					
Harrison Messenger	Boys' giant slalom	1:07.08	31	DNF			
Harrison Messenger	Boys' super-G	57.59	34	—N/a		57.59	34
Harrison Messenger	Boys' combined	57.59	34	36.25	25	1:33.84	23

== Biathlon ==
Athlete	Event	Time	Penalties	Rank
Campbell Wright	Boys' sprint	19:45.1	1 (1+0)	4
Campbell Wright	Boys' individual	35:20.9	4 (0+1+3+0)	6

== Cross-country skiing ==
Athlete	Event	Qualification		Quarterfinal		Semifinal		Final	
Athlete	Event	Time	Rank	Time	Rank	Time	Rank	Time	Rank
Campbell Wright	Boys' 10 km classic	—N/a						29:17.0	32
Campbell Wright	Boys' sprint freestyle	3:23.22	18 Q	3:28.49	5	did not progress			
Campbell Wright	Boys' cross-country cross	4:35.44	26 Q	—N/a		4:28.65	8	did not progress	

== Curling ==
Mixed team

Team	Event	Group stage						Quarterfinal	Semifinal	Final / BM	
Team	Event	Opposition Score	Opposition Score	Opposition Score	Opposition Score	Opposition Score	Rank	Opposition Score	Opposition Score	Opposition Score	Rank
Hunter Walker; Lucy Neilson; William Becker; Zoe Harman	Mixed team	Slovenia; W 8–4	France; W 6–4	Turkey; W 7–6	Norway; W 6–5	Great Britain; L 7–9	1 Q	Germany; W 7–4	Japan; L 4–8	Russia; L 5–9	4

Mixed doubles

Athletes	Event	Round of 48	Round of 24	Round of 12	Round of 6	Semifinals	Final / BM	
Athletes	Event	Opposition Result	Opposition Result	Opposition Result	Opposition Result	Opposition Result	Opposition Result	Rank
Anna Lasmane (LAT); William Becker (NZL)	Mixed doubles	Da Ros (SUI) / Hebert (USA); W 10–4	Lo Deserto (ITA) / Raubert (ESP); W 8–7	Beitone (FRA) / Lysakov (RUS); L 5–10	did not advance			
Zoe Harman (NZL); Merlin Gros-Soubzmaigne (FRA)	Mixed doubles	Wosińska (POL) / Zhang (CHN); L 2–8	did not advance					
Lucy Neilson (NZL); Henry Grünberg (EST)	Mixed doubles	Şengül (TUR) / Moberg (SWE); L 3–7	did not advance					
Leticia Cid (BRA); Hunter Walker (NZL)	Mixed doubles	Deschenes (CAN) / Gastó (ESP); L 9–10	did not advance					

== Freestyle skiing ==
Athlete	Event	Qualification				Final				
Athlete	Event	Run 1	Run 2	Best	Rank	Run 1	Run 2	Run 3	Best / Total	Rank
Ruby Andrews	Girls' halfpipe	61.66	~~DNS~~	61.66	7 Q	66.00	~~64.33~~	~~DNS~~	66.00	5
Ruby Andrews	Girls' slopestyle	DNS				did not advance				
Ruby Andrews	Girls' big air	DNS				did not advance				
Ben Barclay	Boys' slopestyle	~~56.66~~	57.66	57.66	16	did not advance				
Ben Barclay	Boys' big air	68.50	~~56.75~~	68.50	15	did not advance				
Luca Harrington	Boys' halfpipe	~~77.66~~	86.00	86.00	1 Q	~~80.33~~	~~79.66~~	80.66	80.66	3rd place, bronze medalist(s)
Luca Harrington	Boys' slopestyle	~~59.66~~	68.33	68.33	8 Q	67.33	~~64.33~~	~~57.66~~	67.33	10
Luca Harrington	Boys' big air	85.25	~~34.75~~	85.25	4 Q	~~23.75~~	25.25	DNS	25.25	12
Max McDonald	Boys' halfpipe	57.66	~~36.00~~	57.66	7 Q	76.00	~~48.33~~	~~56.00~~	76.00	4
Max McDonald	Boys' slopestyle	63.00	~~32.33~~	63.00	13	did not advance				
Max McDonald	Boys' big air	DNS				did not advance				

== Ice hockey ==
=== 3x3 ===
Team	Event	Group stage								Semifinal	Final / BM	
Team	Event	Opposition Score	Opposition Score	Opposition Score	Opposition Score	Opposition Score	Opposition Score	Opposition Score	Rank	Opposition Score	Opposition Score	Rank
Team Blue; Caleb Chapman (NZL); Chen Chih-yuan (TPE); Jakub Trzebunia (POL); Ziya Efe Güçlü (TUR); Hong Seung-woo (KOR); Daniel Assavolyuk (GER); Joris Valčiukas (LTU); Riley Langille (AUS); Cater Hamill (GBR); Konrad Kudeviita (EST); Simone Terraneo (SUI); Oliver Thestrup Hansen (DEN); Issa Otsuka (JPN)	Boys' 3x3	Team Grey; L 8–9 (1–2, 3–5, 4–2)	Team Orange; L 1–12 (1–5 0–2 0–5)	Team Black; L 8–14 (4–7, 2–5, 2–2)	Team Green; L 6–11 (1–2, 3–2, 2–7)	Team Yellow; L 8–13 (2–3, 2–4, 4–6)	Team Brown; L 2–14 (0–5, 1–3, 1–6)	Team Red; L 11–18 (2–11, 3–3, 6–4)	8	did not advance		
Team Brown; Axel Ruski-Jones (NZL); Luka Banek (CRO); Sai Lake (AUS); Hugo Galvez (FRA); Elvis Hsu (HKG); Marlon D'Acunto (GER); Erik Potšinok (EST); Evan Nauth (GBR); Artur Seniut (LTU); Matyáš Šapovaliv (CZE); Milán Ivády (HUN); Rastislav Eliáš (SVK); Sebastian Aarsund (NOR)	Boys' 3x3	Team Black; W 13–11 (6–5, 3–2, 4–4)	Team Green; L 6–8 (1–2 3–2 2–4)	Team Grey; W 16–6 (4–3, 4–2, 8–1)	Team Orange; W 14–10 (6–0, 5–4, 3–6)	Team Red; L 5–11 (2–3, 1–4, 2–4)	Team Blue; W 14–2 (5–0, 3–1, 6–1)	Team Yellow; W 8–6 (2–1, 2–0, 4–5)	2	Team Red; L 7–9 (4–4, 2–3, 1–2)	Team Black; W 6–5 (1–2, 3–1, 2–2)	3rd place, bronze medalist(s)
Team Orange; Jack Lewis (NZL); Matthew Hamnett (SGP); Jakub Michalski (POL); Diego Rodriguez (MEX); Tomoyoshi Yuki (JPN); Nicolò Remolato (ITA); Kim Sang-yeob (KOR); Jonas Dobnig (AUT); Roman Kechter (GER); Márk Weidemann (HUN); Leni Michellod (SUI); Ivan Novozhilov (RUS); Yan Shostak (BLR)	Boys' 3x3	Team Red; W 8–6 (1–3, 1–1, 6–2)	Team Blue; W 12–1 (5–1 2–0 5–0)	Team Yellow; L 4–9 (1–2, 1–5, 2–2)	Team Brown; L 10–14 (0–6, 4–5, 6–3)	Team Black; W 14–8 (3–4, 4–3, 7–1)	Team Green; L 6–8 (1–1, 1–1, 4–6)	Team Grey; L 2–5 (2–3, 0–0, 0–2)	6	did not advance		
Team Brown; Tallulah Bryant (NZL); Arwen Nylaander (SLO); Julia Termens (ESP); Nausikäa Clement (FRA); Ximena González (MEX); Riko Matsumoto (JPN); Roos Karst (NED); Celine Mayer (GER); Alicja Sowa (POL); Barbora Bartáková (CZE); Marja Linzbichler (AUT); Ivana Latková (SVK); Daniella Lauritzen Pizarro (NOR)	Girls' 3x3	Team Black; L 6–7 (1–3, 3–3, 2–1)	Team Green; W 6–4 (1–0, 1–3, 4–1)	Team Grey; L 7–9 (1–3, 5–3, 1–3)	Team Orange; W 10–4 (1–3, 6–0, 3–1)	Team Red; L 7–11 (1–3, 2–4, 4–4)	Team Blue; L 4–5 (2–0, 1–0, 1–4, Pen 0–1)	Team Yellow; W 10–6 (4–1, 4–3, 2–2)	4	Team Black; L 7–11 (5–3, 1–6, 1–2)	Team Blue; L 4–6 (0–4, 1–2, 3–0)	4
Team Yellow; Katya Blong (NZL); Anke Steeno (BEL); Eva Aizpurua (ESP); Ludmilla Bourcet (FRA); Elisa Innocenti (ITA); Iris van Houten (NED); Zuzana Trnková (CZE); Luisa Wilson (MEX); Shin Seo-yoon (KOR); Leonie Böttcher (GER); Nora Pollestad (NOR); Nubya Aeschlimann (SUI); Magdalena Luggin (AUT)	Girls' 3x3	Team Green; W 12–4 (6–2, 2–0, 4–2)	Team Grey; W 11–5 (5–1, 4–0, 2–4)	Team Orange; W 8–3 (1–0, 3–3, 4–0)	Team Black; L 2–7 (0–3, 1–2, 1–2)	Team Blue; W 8–5 (5–0, 2–4, 1–1)	Team Red; L 5–8 (2–3, 1–3, 2–2)	Team Brown; L 6–10 (1–4, 3–4, 2–2)	3	Team Blue; W 7–5 (2–0, 3–2, 2–3)	Team Black; W 6–1 (1–1, 4–0, 1–0)	1st place, gold medalist(s)

== Luge ==
Singles

Athlete	Event	Run 1		Run 2		Total	
Athlete	Event	Time	Rank	Time	Rank	Time	Rank
Hunter Burke	Boys' singles	56.285	21	55.744	15	1:52.029	18
Ella Cox	Girls' singles	56.424	17	56.171	17	1:52.595	18

Team relay

Athlete	Event	Girls' single	Boys' single	Double	Total	Rank
Ella Cox (NZL); Hunter Burke (NZL); Yang Shih-hsun / Yeh Meng-jhe (TPE)	Mixed team relay	59.137	1:00.747	1:01.061	3:00.945	8

== Short track speed skating ==
Individual

Athlete	Event	Heat		Quarterfinal		Semifinal		Final	
Athlete	Event	Time	Rank	Time	Rank	Time	Rank	Time	Rank
Ethan De Rose	Boys' 500 m	43.280	1 Q	42.689	3	did not advance			
Ethan De Rose	Boys' 1000 m	1:34.230	1 Q	1:31.751	2 Q	1:33.167	4 QB	1:31.751	7

Mixed NOC team relay

Athlete	Event	Semifinal		Final	
Athlete	Event	Time	Rank	Time	Rank
Ethan De Rose (NZL); Thomas Nadalini (ITA); Seo Whi-min (KOR); Olivia Weedon (GBR)	Mixed team relay	4:15.427	2 QA	4:16.115	3rd place, bronze medalist(s)

== Snowboarding ==
Athlete	Event	Qualification				Final				
Athlete	Event	Run 1	Run 2	Best	Rank	Run 1	Run 2	Run 3	Best	Rank
Mitchell Davern	Boys' slopestyle	12.00	50.00	50.00	12 Q	24.33	20.66	10.00	24.33	10
Mitchell Davern	Boys' big air	85.25	54.75	85.25	3 Q	84.75	80.00	94.75	174.75	5

== See also ==
- New Zealand at the 2020 Summer Olympics
