= Mixed-NOCs at the 2020 Winter Youth Olympics =

- IOC code: MIX

in Lausanne
- Competitors: 524 in 9 sports
- Medals: Gold 6 Silver 6 Bronze 6 Total 18

Winter Youth Olympics appearances (overview)
- 2012; 2016; 2020; 2024

Teams made up of athletes representing different National Olympic Committees (NOCs), called mixed-NOCs teams, participated in the 2020 Winter Youth Olympics. These teams participated in either events composed entirely of mixed-NOCs teams, or in events which saw the participation of mixed-NOCs teams and non-mixed-NOCs teams. When a mixed-NOCs team won a medal, the Olympic flag was raised rather than a national flag; if a mixed-NOCs team won gold, the Olympic anthem would be played instead of national anthems. A total of 6 events with Mixed NOCs were held.

== Background ==
The concept of mixed-NOCs was introduced in the 2010 Summer Youth Olympics, in which athletes from different nations would compete in the same team, often representing their continent. This is in contrast to the Mixed team (IOC code: ZZX) found at early senior Olympic Games.

== Medal summary ==
=== Medal table ===
* Host nation (Switzerland)

Rank	Nation	Gold	Silver	Bronze	Total
1	Russia	3	4	3	10
2	Japan	3	3	1	7
3	France	2	3	1	6
4	Netherlands	2	2	0	4
5	Hungary	2	1	3	6
6	Italy	2	1	1	4
6	Norway	2	1	1	4
6	South Korea	2	1	1	4
9	Czech Republic	2	0	2	4
10	Austria	2	0	1	3
10	Estonia	2	0	1	3
12	Spain	2	0	0	2
13	Finland	1	3	1	5
14	Switzerland*	1	2	1	4
14	United States	1	2	1	4
16	Germany	1	1	2	4
17	Ukraine	1	1	1	3
18	Slovenia	1	1	0	2
19	New Zealand	1	0	2	3
20	Canada	1	0	1	2
20	Hong Kong	1	0	1	2
22	Belarus	1	0	0	1
22	Belgium	1	0	0	1
22	Georgia	1	0	0	1
22	Luxembourg	1	0	0	1
22	Mexico	1	0	0	1
27	Great Britain	0	3	3	6
28	Poland	0	3	1	4
29	Chinese Taipei	0	3	0	3
30	Slovakia	0	2	2	4
31	Australia	0	1	2	3
32	China	0	1	1	2
33	Serbia	0	1	0	1
34	Bulgaria	0	0	1	1
34	Croatia	0	0	1	1
34	Denmark	0	0	1	1
34	Lithuania	0	0	1	1
34	Romania	0	0	1	1
34	Turkey	0	0	1	1
Totals (39 entries)		40	40	40	120

Source: Lausanne 2020

=== Medalists ===
Event	Gold	Silver	Bronze\
Curling; Mixed NOC team	Team HUN / CAN (MIX); Laura Nagy (HUN); Nathan Young (CAN)	Team FRA / RUS (MIX); Chana Beitone (FRA); Nikolai Lysakov (RUS)	Team CHN / CZE (MIX); Pei Junhang (CHN); Vít Chabičovský (CZE)
Figure skating Mixed NOC team	Team Courage (MIX); Arlet Levandi (EST); Ksenia Sinitsyna (RUS); Alina Butaeva / Luka Berulava (GEO); Utana Yoshida / Shingo Nishiyama (JPN)	Team Focus (MIX); Yuma Kagiyama (JPN); Kate Wang (USA); Cate Fleming / Jedidah Isbell (USA); Sofya Tyutyunina / Alexander Shustitskiy (RUS)	Team Vision (MIX); Andrei Mozalev (RUS); Regina Schermann (HUN); Sofiia Nesterova / Artem Darenskyi (UKR); Natalie D'Alessandro / Bruce Waddell (CAN)
Ice hockey Boys' 3x3 mixed tournament	Team Green (MIX); Nicolas Elgas (LUX); Artyom Pronichkin (RUS); Nathan Nicoud (FRA); Volodymyr Troshkin (UKR); Pablo González (ESP); Maks Perčič (SLO); Yam Yau (HKG); Alessandro Segafredo (ITA); Marek Potšinok (EST); Patrik Dalen (NOR); Ilya Korzun (BLR); Levente Hegedűs (HUN); Štěpán Maleček (CZE)	Team Red (MIX); Juho Lukkari (FIN); Denis Pasko (UKR); Lin Wei-yu (TPE); Aleks Menc (POL); Matija Dinić (SRB); Peter Repčík (SVK); Mackenzie Stewart (GBR); Dylan Wesseling (NED); Tjaš Lesničar (SLO); Sander Salvær (NOR); Jan Hornecker (SUI); Matthias Bittner (GER); Maël Halladj (FRA)	Team Brown (MIX); Luka Banek (CRO); Sai Lake (AUS); Hugo Galvez (FRA); Elvis Hsu (HKG); Axel Ruski-Jones (NZL); Marlon D'Acunto (GER); Erik Potšinok (EST); Evan Nauth (GBR); Artur Seniut (LTU); Matyáš Šapovaliv (CZE); Milán Ivády (HUN); Rastislav Eliáš (SVK); Sebastian Aarsund (NOR)
Ice hockey Girl's 3x3 mixed tournament	Team Yellow (MIX); Anke Steeno (BEL); Eva Aizpurua (ESP); Ludmilla Bourcet (FRA); Elisa Innocenti (ITA); Katya Blong (NZL); Iris van Houten (NED); Zuzana Trnková (CZE); Luisa Wilson (MEX); Shin Seo-yoon (KOR); Leonie Böttcher (GER); Nora Pollestad (NOR); Nubya Aeschlimann (SUI); Magdalena Luggin (AUT)	Team Black (MIX); Angelina Hurschler (SUI); Courtney Mahoney (AUS); Zhang Xinyue (CHN); Chang En-ni (TPE); Alicja Mota (POL); Nikola Janeková (SVK); Amy Robery (GBR); Daria Petrova (RUS); Kimberly Collard (NED); Luca Márton (HUN); Reina Sato (JPN); Emilia Kyrkkö (FIN); Carlotta Regine (ITA)	Team Blue (MIX); Sidre Özer (TUR); Valerie Christmann (SUI); Anna Kot (POL); Maria Runevska (BUL); Mirren Foy (GBR); Zuzana Dobiašová (SVK); Yana Krasheninina (RUS); Maya Stober (GER); Regina Metzler (HUN); Karolina Hengelmüller (AUT); Nikki Sharp (AUS); Yuna Kusama (JPN); Aya Juhl Petersen (DEN)
Short track speed skating Mixed NOC team relay	Team B (MIX); Kim Chan-seo (KOR); Diede van Oorschot (NED); Shogo Miyata (JPN); Jonathan So (USA)	Team G (MIX); Iuliia Beresneva (RUS); Chang Hui (TPE); Jang Sung-woo (KOR); Gabriel Volet (FRA)	Team A (MIX); Olivia Weedon (GBR); Seo Whi-min (KOR); Thomas Nadalini (ITA); Ethan De Rose (NZL)
Speed skating Team sprint	Team 3 (MIX); Sini Siro (FIN); Yukino Yoshida (JPN); Ignaz Gschwentner (AUT); Alexander Sergeev (RUS)	Team 16 (MIX); Laura Kivioja (FIN); Daria Kopacz (POL); Theo Collins (GBR); Motonaga Arito (JPN)	Team 14 (MIX); Ramona Ionel (ROU); Valeriia Sorokoletova (RUS); Tuukka Suomalainen (FIN); Jonathan Tobon (USA)

== Teams ==
=== Curling ===
The Mixed curling doubles tournament is one of six mixed-NOCs events. There are 48 teams participating in this event. Teams have one boy and one girl thrower. The teams will be selected by the organizing committee based on the final ranking from the mixed team competition in a way that balances out the teams. The players in each pair will then be allowed time to train together.

- Team BRA / JPN
  - Gabriela Rogic Farias (BRA)
  - Asei Nakahara (JPN)
- Team BRA / NZL
  - Leticia Cid (BRA)
  - Hunter Walker (NZL)
- Team CAN / SLO
  - Lauren Rajala (CAN)
  - Bine Sever (SLO)
- Team CAN / ESP
  - Emily Deschenes (CAN)
  - Oriol Gastó (ESP)
- Team CZE / SWE
  - Kristyna Farková (CZE)
  - Axel Landelius (SWE)
- Team CZE / KOR
  - Zuzana Pražáková (CZE)
  - Moon Si-woo (KOR)
- Team CHN / CZE
  - Pei Junhang (CHN)
  - Vít Chabičovský (CZE)
- Team CHN / TUR
  - Liu Tong (CHN)
  - Selahattin Eser (TUR)
- Team DEN / CHN
  - Karolina Jensen (DEN)
  - Zhai Zhixin (CHN)
- Team DEN / GBR
  - Natalie Wiksten (DEN)
  - Ross Craik (GBR)
- Team EST / NOR
  - Natali Vedro (EST)
  - Lukas Høstmælingen (NOR)
- Team EST / RUS
  - Katariina Klammer (EST)
  - Mikhail Vlasenko (RUS)
- Team FRA / NOR
  - Maëlle Vergnaud (FRA)
  - Grunde Buraas (NOR)
- Team FRA / RUS
  - Chana Beitone (FRA)
  - Nikolai Lysakov (RUS)
- Team GER / HUN
  - Zoé Antes (GER)
  - Kristóf Szarvas (HUN)
- Team GER / USA
  - Kim Sutor (GER)
  - Charlie Thompson (USA)
- Team GBR / CZE
  - Robyn Mitchell (GBR)
  - František Jiral (CZE)
- Team GBR / TUR
  - Hannah Farries (GBR)
  - Kadir Polat (TUR)
- Team HUN / CAN
  - Laura Nagy (HUN)
  - Nathan Young (CAN)
- Team HUN / ITA
  - Linda Joó (HUN)
  - Simone Piffer (ITA)
- Team ITA / ESP
  - Marta Lo Deserto (ITA)
  - Aleix Raubert (ESP)
- Team ITA / SLO
  - Federica Ghedina (ITA)
  - Jakob Omerzel (SLO)
- Team JPN / EST
  - Momoha Tabata (JPN)
  - Romet Mäesalu (EST)
- Team JPN / FRA
  - Mina Kobayashi (JPN)
  - Léo Tuaz (FRA)
- Team LAT / JPN
  - Ērika Bitmete (LAT)
  - Takumi Maeda (JPN)
- Team LAT / FRA
  - Anna Lasmane (LAT)
  - William Becker (NZL)
- Team NZL / EST
  - Lucy Neilson (NZL)
  - Henry Grünberg (EST)
- Team NZL / FRA
  - Zoe Harman (NZL)
  - Merlin Gros-Soubzmaigne (FRA)
- Team NOR / BRA
  - Nora Østgård (NOR)
  - Michael Velve (BRA)
- Team NOR / LAT
  - Ingeborg Forbregd (NOR)
  - Ričards Vonda (LAT)
- Team POL / CHN
  - Monika Wosińska (POL)
  - Zhang Likun (CHN)
- Team POL / GBR
  - Klaudia Szmidt (POL)
  - Jamie Rankin (GBR)
- Team RUS / BRA
  - Alina Fakhurtdinova (RUS)
  - Vitor Melo (BRA)
- Team RUS / LAT
  - Valeriia Denisenko (RUS)
  - Eduards Seļiverstovs (LAT)
- Team SLO / GER
  - Sara Rigler (SLO)
  - Benjamin Kapp (GER)
- Team SLO / SUI
  - Liza Gregori (SLO)
  - Maximilian Winz (SUI)
- Team KOR / DEN
  - Kim Ji-yoon (KOR)
  - Jonathan Vilandt (DEN)
- Team KOR / POL
  - Park You-been (KOR)
  - Robert Kamiński (POL)
- Team ESP / GER
  - Carmen Pérez (ESP)
  - Johannes Scheuerl (GER)
- Team ESP / SUI
  - Ana Vázquez (ESP)
  - Jan Iseli (SUI)
- Team SWE / DEN
  - Lisa Norrlander (SWE)
  - Kilian Thune (DEN)
- Team SWE / POL
  - Nilla Hallström (SWE)
  - Dominik Szmidt (POL)
- Team SUI / HUN
  - Xenia Schwaller (SUI)
  - Lőrinc Tatár (HUN)
- Team SUI / USA
  - Malin Da Ros (SUI)
  - Ethan Hebert (USA)
- Team TUR / KOR
  - İfayet Şafak Çalıkuşu (TUR)
  - Park Sang-woo (KOR)
- Team TUR / SWE
  - Berfin Şengül (TUR)
  - Olle Moberg (SWE)
- Team USA / CAN
  - Kaitlin Murphy (USA)
  - Jaedon Neuert (CAN)
- Team USA / ITA
  - Alina Tschumakow (USA)
  - Francesco De Zanna (ITA)

=== Figure skating ===
The Figure skating team trophy tournament is one of six mixed-NOCs events. There are 8 teams participating in this event. Teams have one boy and one girl singles, one pairs and one ice dancing skaters. The skaters who took part the team trophy was determined by draw.

- Team Courage
  - Arlet Levandi (EST)
  - Ksenia Sinitsyna (RUS)
  - Alina Butaeva / Luka Berulava (GEO)
  - Utana Yoshida / Shingo Nishiyama (JPN)
- Team Determination
  - Cha Young-hyun (KOR)
  - Nella Pelkonen (FIN)
  - Brooke McIntosh / Brandon Toste (CAN)
  - Katarina Wolfkostin / Jeffrey Chen (USA)
- Team Discovery
  - Nikolaj Memola (ITA)
  - Catherine Carle (CAN)
  - Apollinariia Panfilova / Dmitry Rylov (RUS)
  - Célina Fradji / Jean-Hans Fourneaux (FRA)
- Team Focus
  - Yuma Kagiyama (JPN)
  - Kate Wang (USA)
  - Cate Fleming / Jedidah Isbell (USA)
  - Sofya Tyutyunina / Alexander Shustitskiy (RUS)
- Team Future
  - Matteo Nalbone (ITA)
  - Anna Frolova (RUS)
  - Wang Yuchen / Huang Yihang (CHN)
  - Anna Cherniavska / Oleg Muratov (UKR)
- Team Hope
  - Liam Kapeikis (USA)
  - Maïa Mazzara (FRA)
  - Letizia Roscher / Luis Schuster (GER)
  - Miku Makita / Tyler Gunara (CAN)
- Team Motivation
  - Andrey Kokura (UKR)
  - Alessia Tornaghi (ITA)
  - Diana Mukhametzianova / Ilya Mironov (RUS)
  - Gina Zehnder / Beda-Leon Sieber (SUI)
- Team Vision
  - Andrei Mozalev (RUS)
  - Regina Schermann (HUN)
  - Sofiia Nesterova / Artem Darenskyi (UKR)
  - Natalie D'Alessandro / Bruce Waddell (CAN)

=== Freestyle skiing and Snowboarding ===
The team ski-snowboard cross tournament is the event where there were also teams representing individual NOCs. There are 12 mixed-NOCs teams of total 19 teams participating in this event. Teams have one boy and one girl ski snowboarders and one boy and one girl ski skiers.

- Mixed Team 1
  - Chloé Passerat (FRA)
  - Lia Nilsson (SWE)
  - Ivan Malovannyi (UKR)
  - Kilian Himmelsbach (GER)
- Mixed Team 2
  - Morena Arroyo (ARG)
  - Sage Stefani (CAN)
  - Jacob Walper (CAN)
  - Jack Morrow (CAN)
- Mixed Team 3
  - Ekaterina Lokteva-Zagorskaia (RUS)
  - Maria Shcherbakovskaya (ISR)
  - Noa Coutton-Jean (FRA)
  - Artem Bazhin (RUS)
- Mixed Team 4
  - Federica Fantoni (ITA)
  - Alice Fortkord (SWE)
  - Thomas Abegglen (SUI)
  - Thomas Kolly (SUI)
- Mixed Team 5
  - Amber Essex (AUS)
  - Zoe Michael (AUS)
  - Noah Bethonico (BRA)
  - Jasper Cobcroft (AUS)
- Mixed Team 6
  - Aina Gomáriz (ESP)
  - Marie-Pier Brunet (CAN)
  - Álvaro Romero (ESP)
  - Scott Johns (GBR)
- Mixed Team 7
  - Teodora Ilieva (BUL)
  - Josefina Valdés (CHI)
  - Dante Vera (ARG)
  - Oscar Trygg (NOR)
- Mixed Team 8
  - Nima Yongqing (CHN)
  - Su Yue (CHN)
  - Vladi Kambourov (BUL)
  - Hou Haoyi (CHN)
- Mixed Team 9
  - Marika Savoldelli (ITA)
  - Noa Spoelders (BEL)
  - Niccolò Colturi (ITA)
  - Jannes Debertol (ITA)
- Mixed Team 10
  - Tanja Kobald (AUT)
  - Vladislava Baliukina (RUS)
  - Elias Leitner (AUT)
  - Christoph Danksagmüller (AUT)
- Mixed Team 11
  - Madeline Lochte-Bono (USA)
  - Kayla Anna Lozáková (SVK)
  - Theodore McLemore (USA)
  - Jakub Válek (SVK)
- Mixed Team 12
  - Zsófia Vincze (HUN)
  - Marta Rihtaršič (SLO)
  - Silviu Popa (ROU)
  - Isbat Hoque (HUN)

=== Ice hockey ===
==== Boys' tournament ====
The boys' 3x3 mixed team tournament is one of six mixed-NOCs events. There are 8 teams participating in this event. Teams have eleven players and two goaltenders. The players who took part the mixed team tournament were determined by draw.

- Team Black
  - Junior Espósito (ARG)
  - Lukas Floriantschitz (AUT)
  - Kerem Alsan (TUR)
  - Yaroslav Labutkin (RUS)
  - Yu Jiacong (CHN)
  - Corné van Stuijvenberg (NED)
  - Wataru Suzuki (JPN)
  - Adam Sýkora (SVK)
  - Dominik Pavlata (CZE)
  - Linas Dėdinas (LTU)
  - Danil Karpovich (BLR)
  - Kalle Varis (FIN)
  - Matthias Rindone (ITA)
- Team Blue
  - Chen Chih-yuan (TPE)
  - Jakub Trzebunia (POL)
  - Caleb Chapman (NZL)
  - Ziya Efe Güçlü (TUR)
  - Hong Seung-woo (KOR)
  - Daniel Assavolyuk (GER)
  - Joris Valčiukas (LTU)
  - Riley Langille (AUS)
  - Cater Hamill (GBR)
  - Konrad Kudeviita (EST)
  - Simone Terraneo (SUI)
  - Oliver Thestrup Hansen (DEN)
  - Issa Otsuka (JPN)
- Team Brown
  - Luka Banek (CRO)
  - Sai Lake (AUS)
  - Hugo Galvez (FRA)
  - Elvis Hsu (HKG)
  - Axel Ruski-Jones (NZL)
  - Marlon D'Acunto (GER)
  - Erik Potšinok (EST)
  - Evan Nauth (GBR)
  - Artur Seniut (LTU)
  - Matyáš Šapovaliv (CZE)
  - Milán Ivády (HUN)
  - Rastislav Eliáš (SVK)
  - Sebastian Aarsund (NOR)
- Team Green
  - Nicolas Elgas (LUX)
  - Artyom Pronichkin (RUS)
  - Nathan Nicoud (FRA)
  - Volodymyr Troshkin (UKR)
  - Pablo González (ESP)
  - Maks Perčič (SLO)
  - Yam Yau (HKG)
  - Alessandro Segafredo (ITA)
  - Marek Potšinok (EST)
  - Patrik Dalen (NOR)
  - Ilya Korzun (BLR)
  - Levente Hegedűs (HUN)
  - Štěpán Maleček (CZE)
- Team Grey
  - Thawab Al-Subaey (QAT)
  - Alejandro Resendiz (MEX)
  - Nowruz Baýhanow (TKM)
  - Gosei Daikuhara (JPN)
  - Timofei Katkov (RUS)
  - Pablo Mata (ESP)
  - Sohn Hyun (KOR)
  - Patrik Melicher (SVK)
  - Jan Billa (AUT)
  - Nino Tomov (BUL)
  - Boldizsár Szalay (HUN)
  - Lukas Svedin (SWE)
  - Alexei Baidek (KAZ)
- Team Orange
  - Matthew Hamnett (SGP)
  - Jakub Michalski (POL)
  - Diego Rodriguez (MEX)
  - Tomoyoshi Yuki (JPN)
  - Nicolò Remolato (ITA)
  - Jack Lewis (NZL)
  - Kim Sang-yeob (KOR)
  - Jonas Dobnig (AUT)
  - Roman Kechter (GER)
  - Márk Weidemann (HUN)
  - Leni Michellod (SUI)
  - Ivan Novozhilov (RUS)
  - Yan Shostak (BLR)
- Team Red
  - Juho Lukkari (FIN)
  - Denis Pasko (UKR)
  - Lin Wei-yu (TPE)
  - Aleks Menc (POL)
  - Matija Dinić (SRB)
  - Peter Repčík (SVK)
  - Mackenzie Stewart (GBR)
  - Dylan Wesseling (NED)
  - Tjaš Lesničar (SLO)
  - Sander Salvær (NOR)
  - Jan Hornecker (SUI)
  - Matthias Bittner (GER)
  - Maël Halladj (FRA)
- Team Yelloww
  - Tibo Van Reeth (BEL)
  - Csongor Antal (ROU)
  - Yassin Soubra (FRA)
  - Tommaso Madaschi (ITA)
  - David Guilabert (ESP)
  - Ryan Kolgen (NED)
  - Miha Beričič (SLO)
  - Andrei Murashko (BLR)
  - Oskar Bakkevig (NOR)
  - Šimon Slavíček (CZE)
  - Daniel Valencia (MEX)
  - Loris Uberti (SUI)
  - Lukas Heuberger (AUT)

==== Girls' tournament ====
The girls' 3x3 mixed team tournament is one of six mixed-NOCs events. There are 8 teams participating in this event. Teams have eleven players and two goaltenders. The players who took part the mixed team tournament were determined by draw.

- Team Black
  - Angelina Hurschler (SUI)
  - Courtney Mahoney (AUS)
  - Zhang Xinyue (CHN)
  - Chang En-ni (TPE)
  - Alicja Mota (POL)
  - Nikola Janeková (SVK)
  - Amy Robery (GBR)
  - Daria Petrova (RUS)
  - Kimberly Collard (NED)
  - Luca Márton (HUN)
  - Reina Sato (JPN)
  - Emilia Kyrkkö (FIN)
  - Carlotta Regine (ITA)
- Team Blue
  - Sidre Özer (TUR)
  - Valerie Christmann (SUI)
  - Anna Kot (POL)
  - Maria Runevska (BUL)
  - Mirren Foy (GBR)
  - Zuzana Dobiašová (SVK)
  - Yana Krasheninina (RUS)
  - Maya Stober (GER)
  - Regina Metzler (HUN)
  - Karolina Hengelmüller (AUT)
  - Nikki Sharp (AUS)
  - Yuna Kusama (JPN)
  - Aya Juhl Petersen (DEN)

- Team Brown
  - Arwen Nylaander (SLO)
  - Julia Termens (ESP)
  - Nausikäa Clement (FRA)
  - Ximena González (MEX)
  - Riko Matsumoto (JPN)
  - Roos Karst (NED)
  - Celine Mayer (GER)
  - Barbora Bartáková (CZE)
  - Tallulah Bryant (NZL)
  - Alicja Sowa (POL)
  - Marja Linzbichler (AUT)
  - Ivana Latková (SVK)
  - Daniella Lauritzen Pizarro (NOR)
- Team Green
  - Melanie Hernandez (MEX)
  - Annie Sommer (FRA)
  - Huang Chun-lin (TPE)
  - Delfina Fattore (ARG)
  - Chanel Hofverberg (GER)
  - Emma Donovalová (SVK)
  - Agata Muraro (ITA)
  - Ruka Kiyokawa (JPN)
  - Jessie Taylor (GBR)
  - Lisa Schröfl (AUT)
  - Kang Si-hyun (KOR)
  - Barbora Dalecká (CZE)
  - Fruzsina Szabó (HUN)
- Team Grey
  - Siria Dore (SUI)
  - Valentina Vrhoci (SRB)
  - Lina Meijer (LUX)
  - Emilia Munteanu (ROU)
  - Ilary Larese De Pasqua (ITA)
  - Zhang Shuqi (CHN)
  - Markéta Mazancová (CZE)
  - Yekaterina Davletshina (RUS)
  - Ebony Brunt (AUS)
  - Lee Eun-ji (KOR)
  - Dorottya Gengeliczky (HUN)
  - Sofie van Dueren (SWE)
  - Jelizaveta Stadnika (LAT)
- Team Orange
  - Polina Lubenets (UKR)
  - Wang Meihe (CHN)
  - Sanne Claessens (NED)
  - Saskia Rohregger (ITA)
  - Isabel Walberg (NOR)
  - Molly Lukowiak (AUS)
  - Yoo Seo-young (KOR)
  - Nadia Sancha (ESP)
  - Sena Hasegawa (JPN)
  - Dóra Véghelyi (HUN)
  - Emma Hofbauer (AUT)
  - Yulia Volkova (RUS)
  - Kristina Chernova (KAZ)
- Team Red
  - Sonia David (ROU)
  - Valeria Ansoleaga (ESP)
  - Kao Wei-ting (TPE)
  - Nie Xinrui (CHN)
  - Abby Rowbotham (GBR)
  - Zoé Mächler (SUI)
  - Mila Lutteral (ARG)
  - Barbora Kapičáková (SVK)
  - Alina Ichayeva (RUS)
  - Bea Storesund (NOR)
  - Andrea Trnková (CZE)
  - Felicity Luby (GER)
  - Anita Origlio (FRA)
- Team Yellow
  - Anke Steeno (BEL)
  - Eva Aizpurua (ESP)
  - Ludmilla Bourcet (FRA)
  - Elisa Innocenti (ITA)
  - Katya Blong (NZL)
  - Iris van Houten (NED)
  - Zuzana Trnková (CZE)
  - Luisa Wilson (MEX)
  - Shin Seo-yoon (KOR)
  - Leonie Böttcher (GER)
  - Nora Pollestad (NOR)
  - Nubya Aeschlimann (SUI)
  - Magdalena Luggin (AUT)

=== Luge ===
The luge team relay tournament is the event where there were also teams representing individual NOCs. There are 4 mixed-NOCs teams of total 13 teams participating in this event. Teams have one boy and girl singles, and mixed doubles lugers.

- Team CAN / ITA
  - Kailey Allan (CAN)
  - Alex Gufler (ITA)
  - Caitlin Nash / Natalie Corless (CAN)
- Team NZL / TPE
  - Ella Cox (NZL)
  - Hunter Burke (NZL)
  - Yang Shih-hsun / Yeh Meng-jhe (TPE)
- Team MDA / JPN
  - Yuki Ishikawa (JPN)
  - Marius Goncear (MDA)
  - Adriana Adam / Aliona Busuioc (MDA)
- Team SLO / CHN
  - Ema Kovačič (SLO)
  - Bao Zhenyu (CHN)
  - Lovro Kovačič / Tian Badžukov (SLO)

=== Short track speed skating ===
The mixed NOC short track speed skating team relay tournament is one of six mixed-NOCs events. There are 8 teams participating in this event. Teams have two boy and girl short track speed skaters. The players who took part the mixed team relay tournament were determined by draw.

- Team A
  - Olivia Weedon (GBR)
  - Seo Whi-min (KOR)
  - Thomas Nadalini (ITA)
  - Ethan De Rose (NZL)
- Team B
  - Kim Chan-seo (KOR)
  - Diede van Oorschot (NED)
  - Shogo Miyata (JPN)
  - Jonathan So (USA)
- Team C
  - Florence Brunelle (CAN)
  - Anna Ruysschaert (LUX)
  - Kosei Hayashi (JPN)
  - Daniil Nikolaev (RUS)
- Team D
  - Michelle Velzeboer (NED)
  - Jenell Berhorst (USA)
  - Zhang Tianyi (CHN)
  - Sanzhar Zhanissov (KAZ)
- Team E
  - Haruna Nagamori (JPN)
  - Petra Rusnáková (SVK)
  - Li Kongchao (CHN)
  - Julian Macaraeg (PHI)
- Team F
  - Barbara Somogyi (HUN)
  - Elisa Confortola (ITA)
  - Félix Pigeon (CAN)
  - Vladimir Balbekov (RUS)
- Team G
  - Iuliia Beresneva (RUS)
  - Chang Hui (TPE)
  - Jang Sung-woo (KOR)
  - Gabriel Volet (FRA)
- Team H
  - Zhang Chutong (CHN)
  - Hailey Choi (USA)
  - Lee Jeong-min (KOR)
  - Natthapat Kancharin (THA)

=== Ski mountaineering ===
The ski mountaineering mixed relay tournament is the event where there were also teams representing individual NOCs. There are 3 mixed-NOCs teams of total 11 teams participating in this event. Teams have two boy and two girl ski mountaineers.

- Team Europe
  - Evgeniia Dolzhenkova (RUS)
  - Matúš Černek (SVK)
  - Laura Kovárová (SVK)
  - Nikita Philippov (RUS)
- Team World 1
  - Ema Chlepkova (CAN)
  - Trym Dalset Lødøen (NOR)
  - Roksana Saveh Shemshaki (IRI)
  - Findlay Eyre (CAN)
- Team World 2
  - Yu Jingxuan (CHN)
  - Liang Qifan (CHN)
  - Suolang Quzhen (CHN)
  - Oriol Olm (AND)

=== Speed skating ===
The mixed NOC speed skating team sprint tournament is one of six mixed-NOCs events. There are 16 teams participating in this event. Teams have two boy and girl speed skaters. The players who took part the mixed team relay tournament were determined by draw.

- Team 1
  - Kateřina Macháčková (CZE)
  - Isabel Grevelt (NED)
  - Max Fiodarav (BLR)
  - Felix Motschmann (GER)
- Team 2
  - Zuzana Kuršová (CZE)
  - Wang Jingyi (CHN)
  - Manuel Zähringer (GER)
  - Andrei Herman (BLR)
- Team 3
  - Sini Siro (FIN)
  - Yukino Yoshida (JPN)
  - Ignaz Gschwentner (AUT)
  - Alexander Sergeev (RUS)
- Team 4
  - Carla Álvarez (ESP)
  - Yang Binyu (CHN)
  - Filip Hawryłak (POL)
  - Nuraly Akzhol (KAZ)
- Team 5
  - Amalie Haugland (NOR)
  - Kim Min-hui (KOR)
  - Oddbjørn Mellemstrand (NOR)
  - Jordan Stolz (USA)
- Team 6
  - Julie Berg Sjøbrend (NOR)
  - Anna Ostlender (GER)
  - Jakub Kočí (CZE)
  - Sebas Diniz (NED)
- Team 7
  - Varvara Bandaryna (BLR)
  - Myrthe de Boer (NED)
  - Lukáš Steklý (CZE)
  - Yudai Yamamoto (JPN)
- Team 8
  - Darya Gavrilova (KAZ)
  - Victoria Stirnemann (GER)
  - Flavio Gross (SUI)
  - Sun Jiazhao (CHN)
- Team 9
  - Serena Pergher (ITA)
  - Ilka Füzesy (ROU)
  - Yang Suk-hoon (KOR)
  - Nil Llop (ESP)
- Team 10
  - Marta Dobrowolska (POL)
  - Yuka Takahashi (JPN)
  - Michał Kopacz (POL)
  - Park Sang-eon (KOR)
- Team 11
  - Luisa María González (ESP)
  - Fran Vanhoutte (BEL)
  - Nicky Rosanelli (ITA)
  - Sander Eitrem (NOR)
- Team 12
  - Katia Filippi (ITA)
  - Aleksandra Rutkovskaia (RUS)
  - Eetu Käsnänen (FIN)
  - Remo Slotegraaf (NED)
- Team 13
  - Karyna Shypulia (BLR)
  - Alina Dauranova (KAZ)
  - Xue Zhiwen (CHN)
  - Diego Amaya (COL)
- Team 14
  - Ramona Ionel (ROU)
  - Valeriia Sorokoletova (RUS)
  - Tuukka Suomalainen (FIN)
  - Jonathan Tobon (USA)
- Team 15
  - Hanna Bíró (HUN)
  - Kang Soo-min (KOR)
  - Yevgeniy Koshkin (KAZ)
  - Pavel Taran (RUS)
- Team 16
  - Laura Kivioja (FIN)
  - Daria Kopacz (POL)
  - Theo Collins (GBR)
  - Motonaga Arito (JPN)
