= Ice hockey at the 2020 Winter Youth Olympics – Girls' 3x3 mixed tournament =

2020 Winter Youth Olympics – Girls' 3x3 mixed tournament
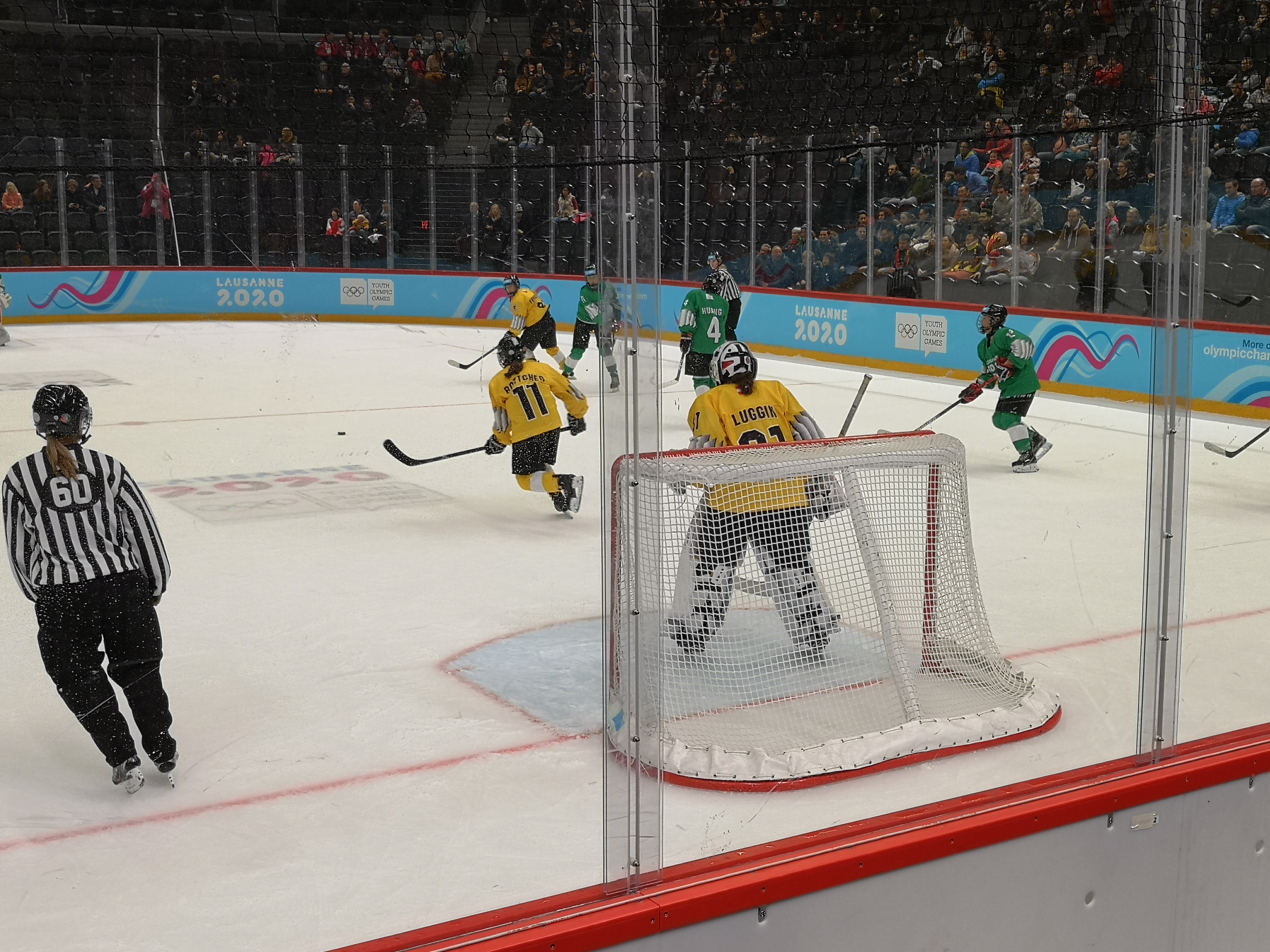

Tournament details
- Host country: Switzerland
- Venue: 1 (in 1 host city)
- Dates: 10–15 January
- Teams: 8

Final positions
- Champions: Team Yellow (MIX)
- Runners-up: Team Black (MIX)
- Third place: Team Blue (MIX)

Tournament statistics
- Games played: 32

The girls' 3x3 mixed ice hockey tournament at the 2020 Winter Youth Olympics was an under-16 ice hockey competition held from 10 to 15 January 2020 at the Vaudoise Aréna in Lausanne, Switzerland.

It was the first girls' 3x3 mixed ice hockey tournament to be included in a Youth Olympic Games (YOG) program. The event format was developed by the International Ice Hockey Federation (IIHF) to maximize the number of participating countries and to give players from developing ice hockey nations the opportunity to compete for a medal.

Players qualified the tournament via the National Skills Challenge, which was used to determine Global Skills Challenge rankings. Operated by the National Olympic Committee (NOC) and national ice hockey governing body of each participating country, the National Skills Challenge was a standardized test created by the IIHF in which players competed against time. The best player of each NOC’s National Skills Challenge automatically qualified to compete and the remaining quota was filled on the basis of global ranking. As the host country, Switzerland was permitted up to four athletes in the girls' 3x3 tournament.

Goaltenders were selected from the top-16 ice hockey nations according to the IIHF Youth Ranking designed specifically for the tournament.

== Teams ==
The eight teams each featured players from thirteen different NOCs, comprising eleven skaters (forwards and defensemen) and two goaltenders. Rosters were published on 20 December 2019.

No	Pos	Team Black	Team Blue	Team Brown	Team Green
2	P	Angelina Hurschler (SUI)	Sidre Özer (TUR)	Arwen Nylaander (SLO)	Melanie Hernández (MEX)
3	P	Courtney Mahoney (AUS)	Valerie Christmann (SUI)	Julia Termens (ESP)	Annie Sommer (FRA)
4	P	Zhang Xinyue (CHN)	Anna Kot (POL)	Nausikäa Clement (FRA)	Huang Chun-lin (TPE)
5	P	Chang En-ni (TPE)	Maria Runevska (BUL)	Ximena González (MEX)	Delfina Fattore (ARG)
6	P	Alicja Mota (POL)	Mirren Foy (GBR)	Riko Matsumoto (JPN)	Chanel Hofverberg (GER)
7	P	Nikola Janeková (SVK)	Zuzana Dobiašová (SVK)	Roos Karst (NED)	Emma Donovalová (SVK)
8	P	Amy Robery (GBR)	Yana Krasheninina (RUS)	Celine Mayer (GER)	Agata Muraro (ITA)
9	P	Daria Petrova (RUS)	Maya Stober (GER)		Ruka Kiyokawa (JPN)
10	P	Kimberly Collard (NED)	Regina Metzler (HUN)	Barbora Bartáková (CZE)	Jessie Taylor (GBR)
11	P	Luca Márton (HUN)	Karolina Hengelmüller (AUT)		Lisa Schröfl (AUT)
12	P	Reina Sato (JPN)	Nikki Sharp (AUS)	Tallulah Bryant (NZL)	Kang Si-hyun (KOR)
20	P			Alicja Sowa (POL)	
21	P			Marja Linzbichler (AUT)	
30	GK	Emilia Kyrkkö (FIN)	Yuna Kusama (JPN)	Ivana Latková (SVK)	Barbora Dalecká (CZE)
31	GK	Carlotta Regine (ITA)	Aya Juhl Petersen (DEN)	Daniella Lauritzen Pizarro (NOR)	Fruzsina Szabó (HUN)
No	Pos	Team Grey	Team Orange	Team Red	Team Yellow
2	P	Siria Dore (SUI)	Polina Lubenets (UKR)	Sonia David (ROU)	Anke Steeno (BEL)
3	P	Valentina Vrhoci (SRB)	Wang Meihe (CHN)	Valeria Ansoleaga (ESP)	Eva Aizpurua (ESP)
4	P	Lina Meijer (LUX)	Sanne Claessens (NED)	Kao Wei-ting (TPE)	Ludmilla Bourcet (FRA)
5	P	Emilia Munteanu (ROU)	Saskia Rohregger (ITA)	Nie Xinrui (CHN)	Elisa Innocenti (ITA)
6	P	Ilary Larese De Pasqua (ITA)	Isabel Walberg (NOR)	Abby Rowbotham (GBR)	Katya Blong (NZL)
7	P	Zhang Shuqi (CHN)	Molly Lukowiak (AUS)	Zoé Mächler (SUI)	Iris van Houten (NED)
8	P	Markéta Mazancová (CZE)	Yoo Seo-young (KOR)	Mila Lutteral (ARG)	Zuzana Trnková (CZE)
9	P	Yekaterina Davletshina (RUS)	Nadia Sancha (ESP)	Barbora Kapičáková (SVK)	Luisa Wilson (MEX)
10	P	Ebony Brunt (AUS)	Sena Hasegawa (JPN)	Alina Ichayeva (RUS)	Shin Seo-yoon (KOR)
11	P	Lee Eun-ji (KOR)	Dóra Véghelyi (HUN)	Bea Storesund (NOR)	Leonie Böttcher (GER)
12	P	Dorottya Gengeliczky (HUN)	Emma Hofbauer (AUT)	Andrea Trnková (CZE)	Nora Pollestad (NOR)
30	GK	Sofie van Dueren (SWE)	Yulia Volkova (RUS)	Felicity Luby (GER)	Nubya Aeschlimann (SUI)
31	GK	Jelizaveta Stadnika (LAT)	Kristina Chernova (KAZ)	Anita Origlio (FRA)	Magdalena Luggin (AUT)

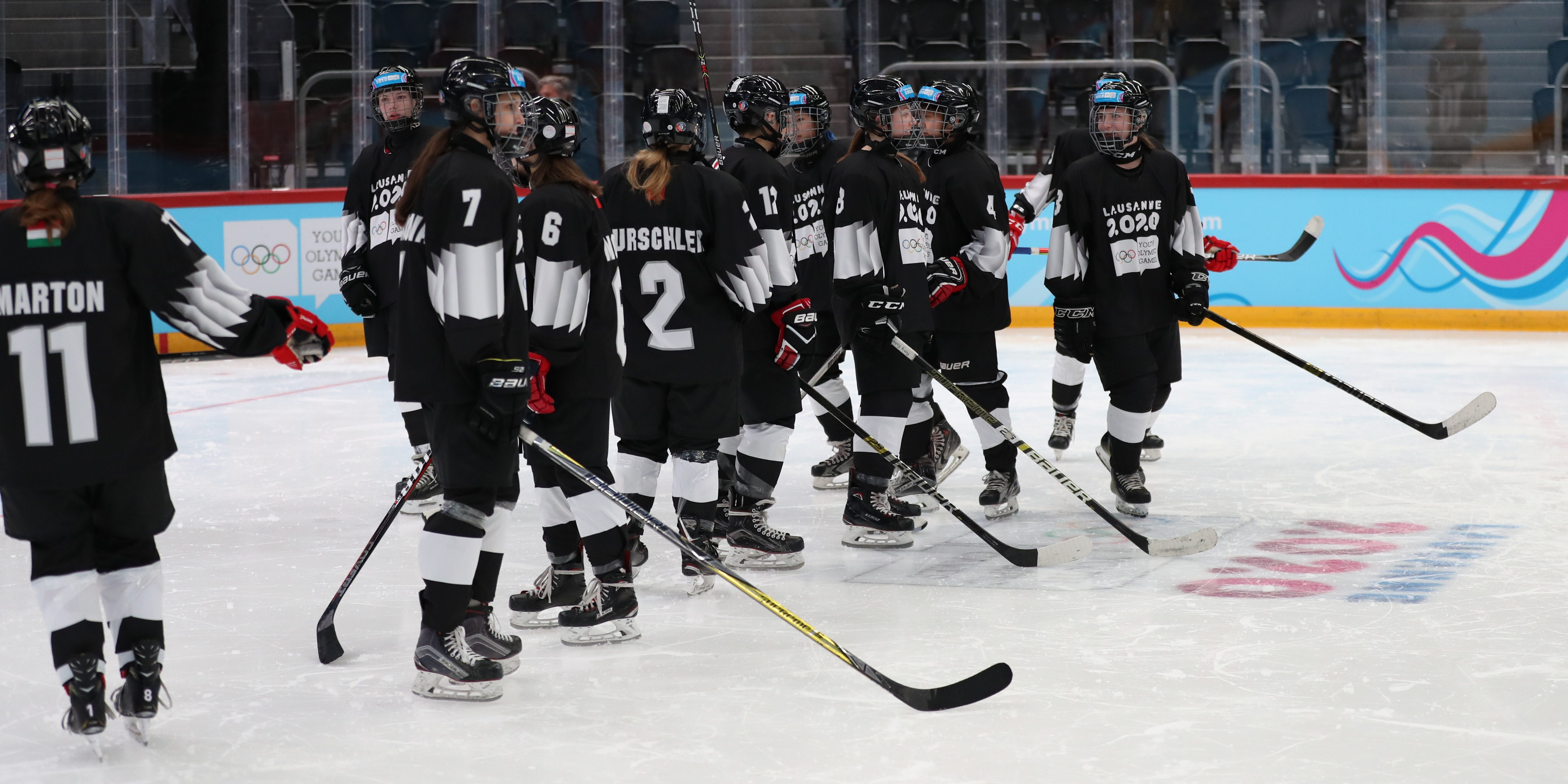
Team Black

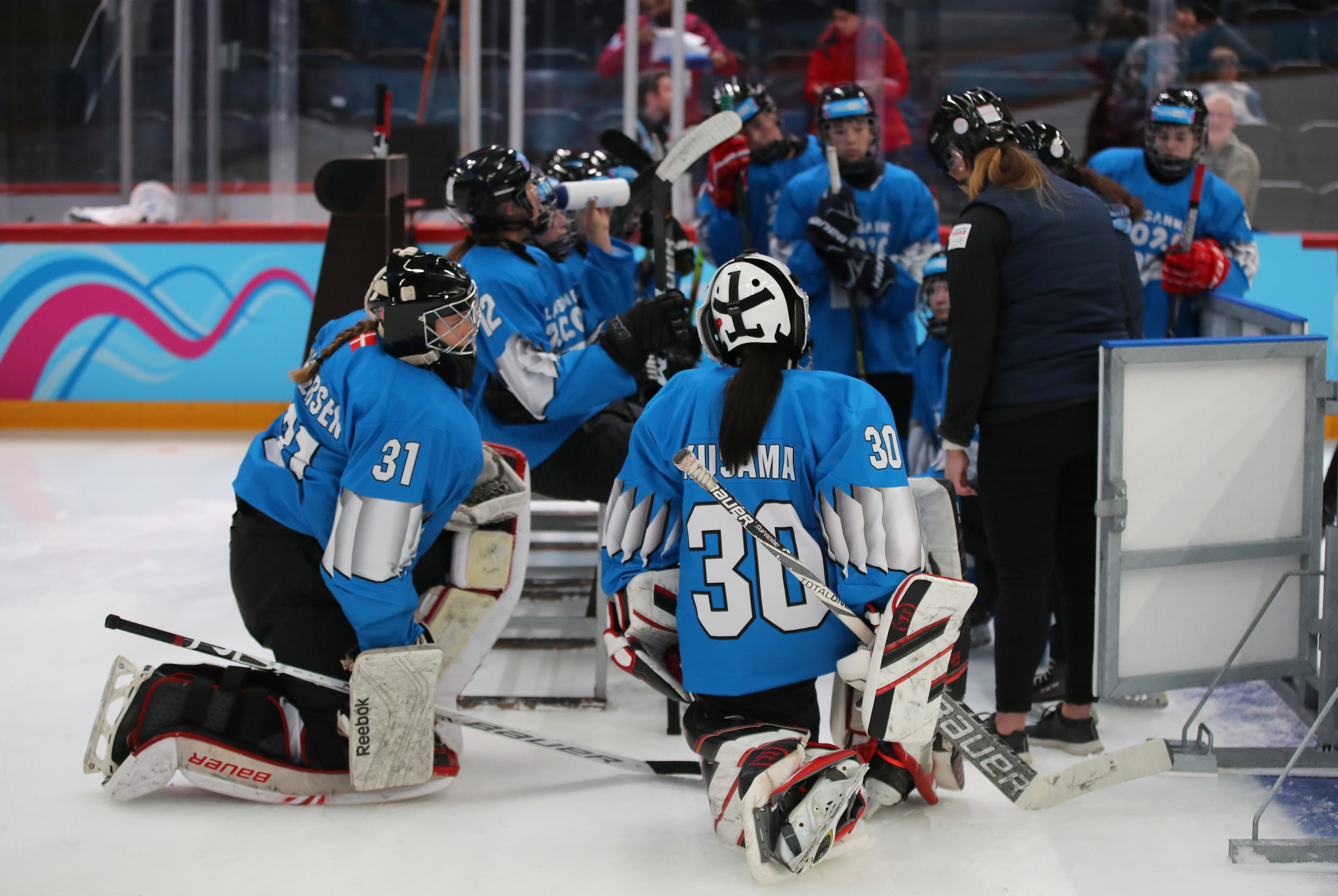
Team Blue

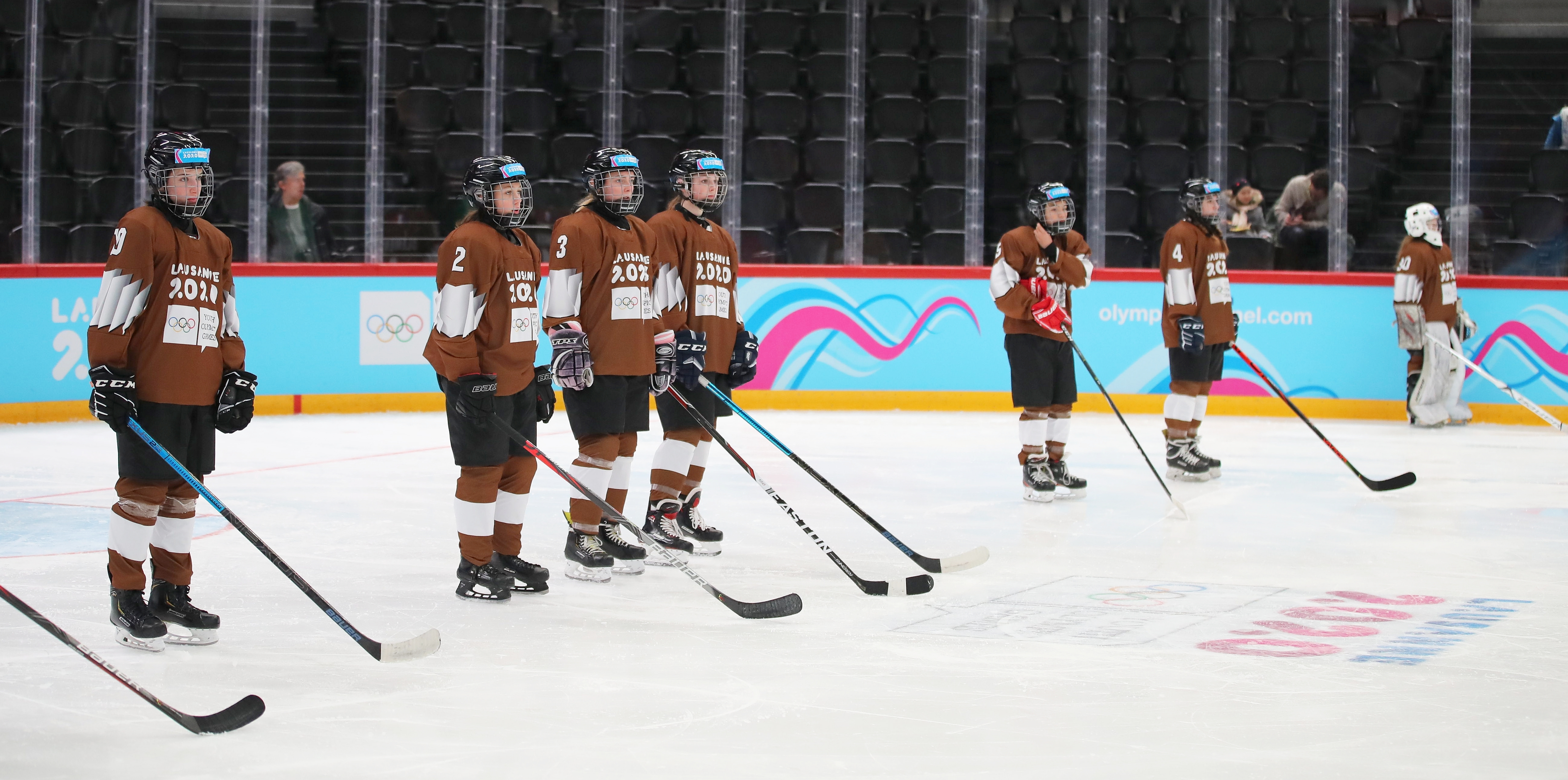
Team Brown

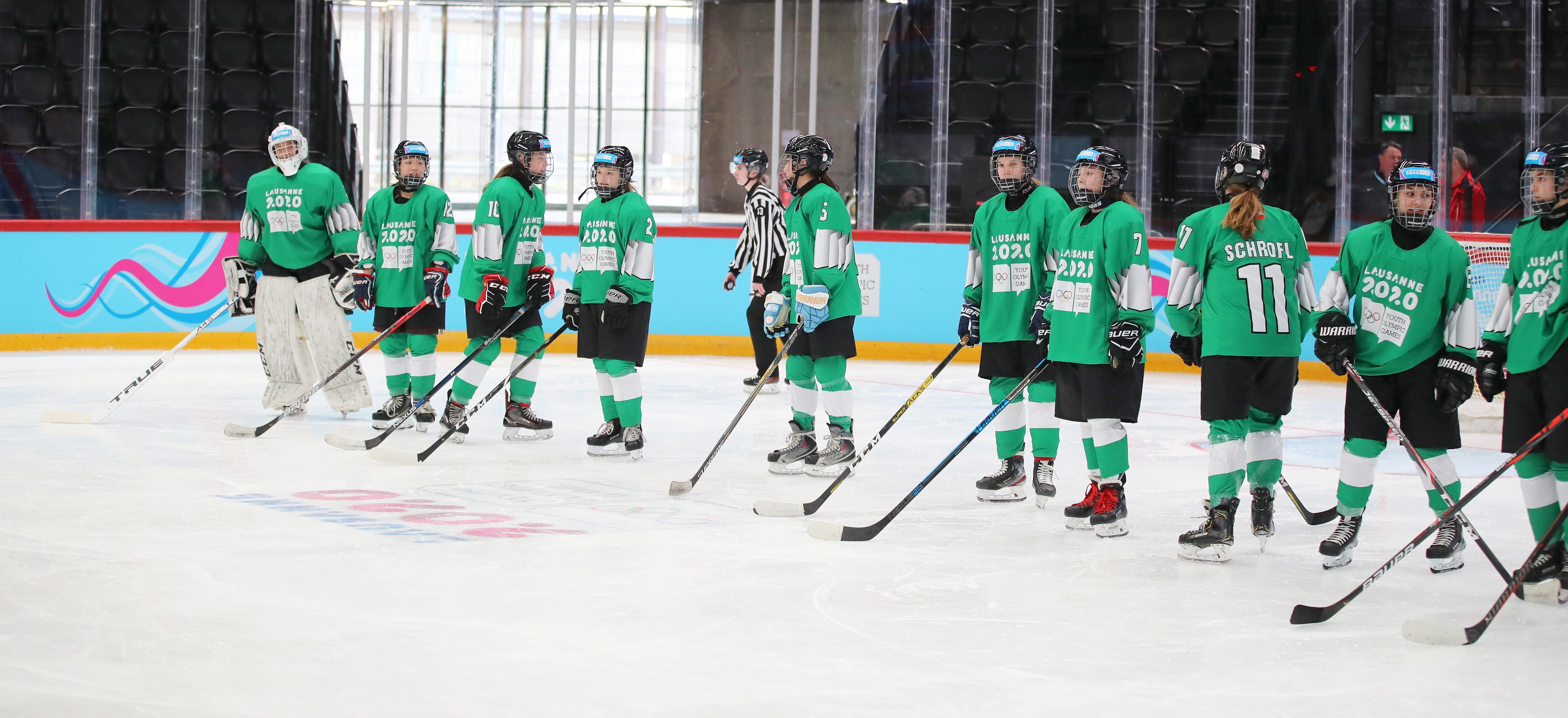
Team Green

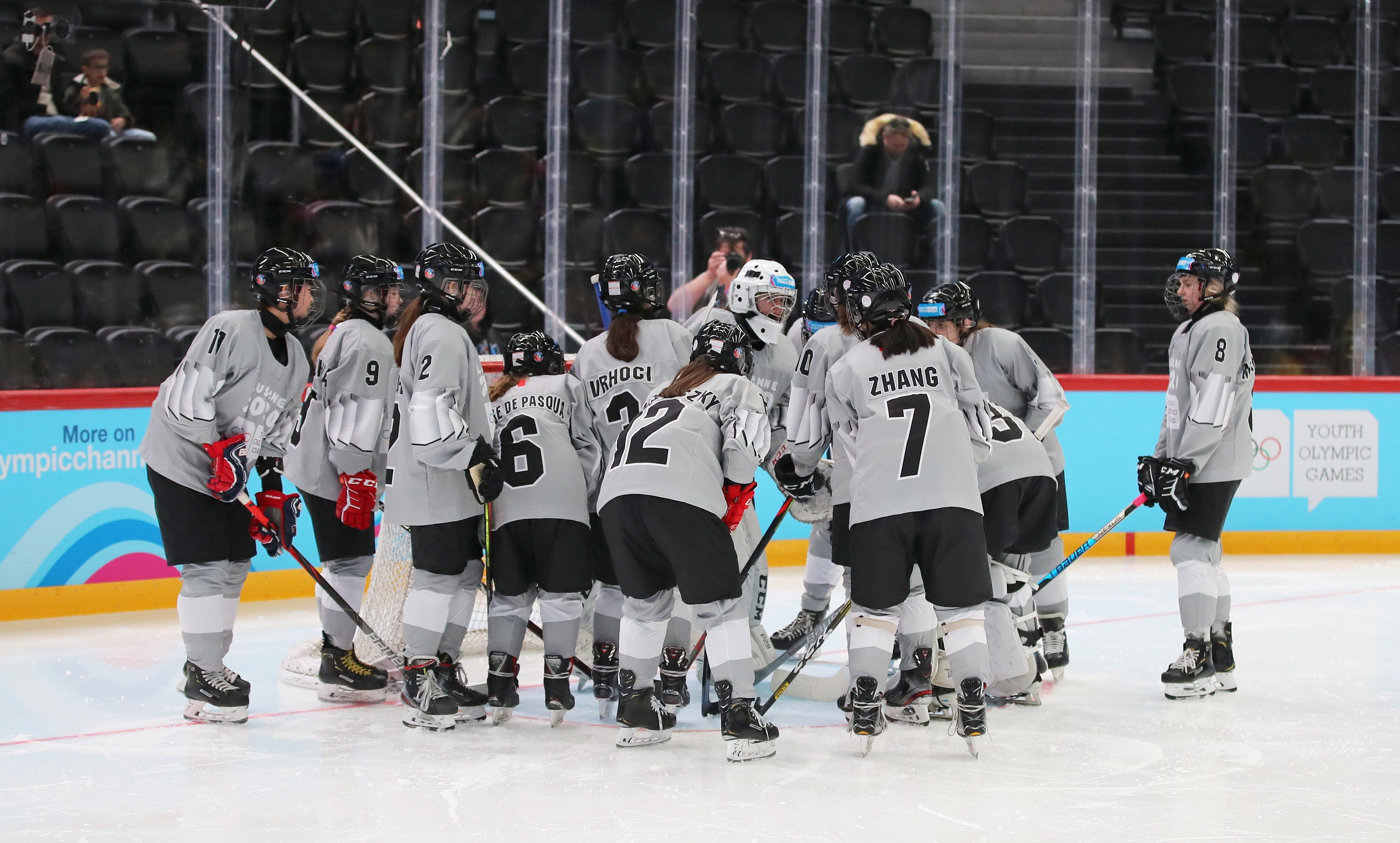
Team Grey

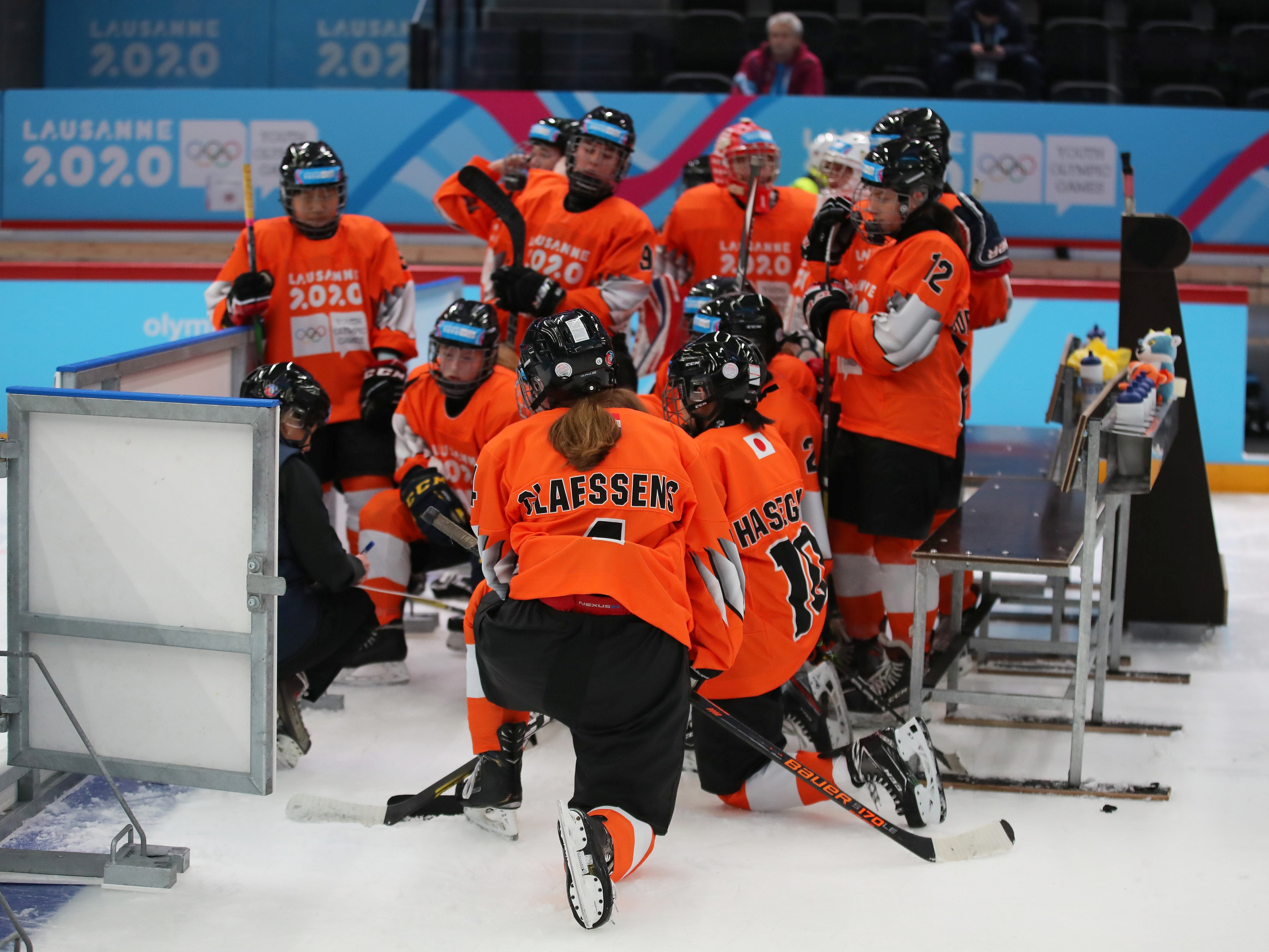
Team Orange

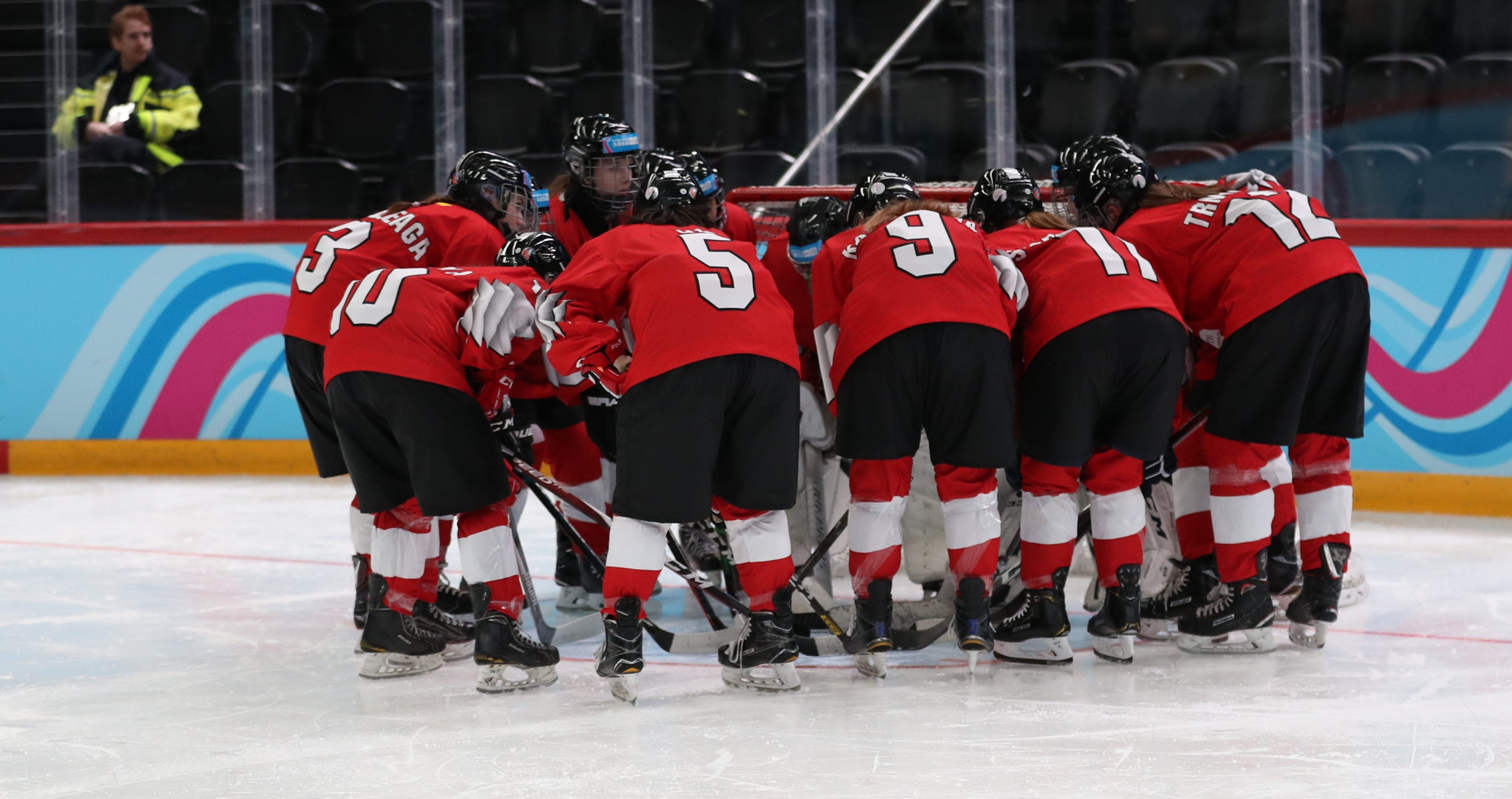
Team Red

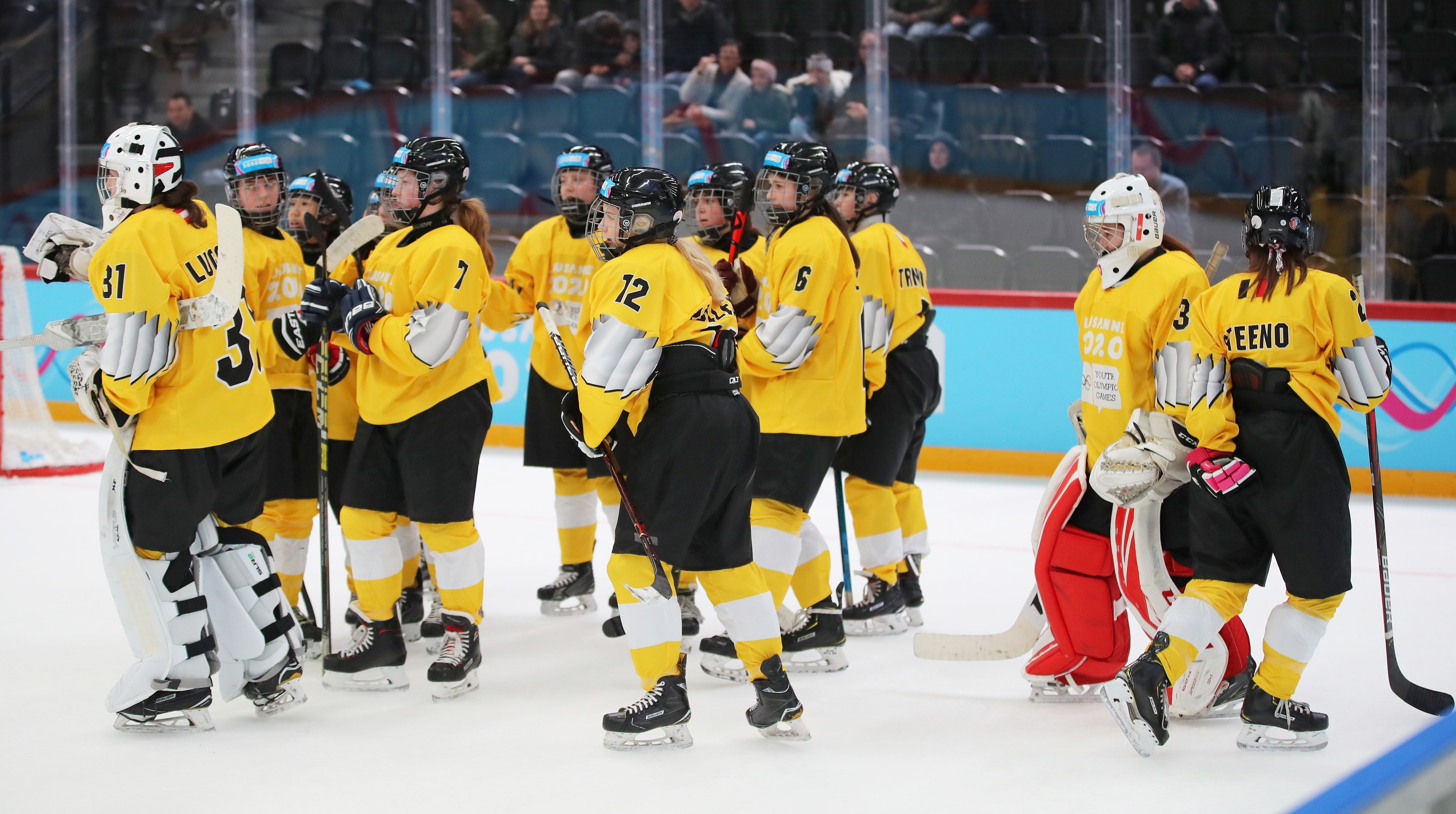
Team Yellow

== Preliminary round ==
The preliminary round was played as a single round-robin and teams were ranked by game points on a three-points system. The top four teams qualified for the semifinals.

All times are local (UTC+1).

Pos	Team	Pld	W	SOW	SOL	L	GF	GA	GD	Pts	Qualification
1	Team Black	7	6	0	0	1	44	30	+14	18	Semifinals
2	Team Blue	7	4	1	1	1	43	35	+8	15	Semifinals
3	Team Yellow	7	4	0	0	3	52	42	+10	12	Semifinals
4	Team Brown	7	3	0	1	3	50	46	+4	10	Semifinals
5	Team Green	7	3	0	0	4	40	49	−9	9 (Note: Team Grey 4–9 Team Green)	
6	Team Grey	7	3	0	0	4	44	52	−8	9	
7	Team Red	7	2	1	0	4	44	44	0	8	
8	Team Orange	7	1	0	0	6	32	51	−19	3	

Source: Lausanne2020
Notes:

10 January 2020; 19:10	Team Yellow	12–4 (6–2, 2–0, 4–2)	Team Green	Vaudoise aréna

Game reference
			Referees: (Canada) Cianna Lieffers (United Kingdom) Hollie Neenan
45	Shots	32	Referees: (Canada) Cianna Lieffers (United Kingdom) Hollie Neenan

10 January 2020; 19:10	Team Brown	6–7 (1–3, 3–3, 2–1)	Team Black	Vaudoise aréna

Game reference
			Referees: (Canada) Jessica Chartrand (United States) Melissa Doyle
40	Shots	34	Referees: (Canada) Jessica Chartrand (United States) Melissa Doyle

10 January 2020; 20:40	Team Red	4–6 (3–2, 1–3, 0–1)	Team Orange	Vaudoise aréna

Game reference
			Referees: (United Kingdom) Hollie Neenan (Sweden) Hanna Persson
30	Shots	46	Referees: (United Kingdom) Hollie Neenan (Sweden) Hanna Persson

10 January 2020; 20:40	Team Grey	7–9 (3–1, 2–5, 2–3)	Team Blue	Vaudoise aréna

Game reference
			Referees: (United States) Melissa Doyle (Canada) Cianna Lieffers
34	Shots	40	Referees: (United States) Melissa Doyle (Canada) Cianna Lieffers

11 January 2020; 12:00	Team Yellow	11–5 (5–1, 4–0, 2–4)	Team Grey	Vaudoise aréna

Game reference
			Referees: (United States) Melissa Doyle (Sweden) Hanna Persson
47	Shots	39	Referees: (United States) Melissa Doyle (Sweden) Hanna Persson

11 January 2020; 12:00	Team Black	5–4 (2–2, 1–2, 2–0)	Team Red	Vaudoise aréna

Game reference
			Referees: (Canada) Jessica Chartrand (Canada) Cianna Lieffers
48	Shots	38	Referees: (Canada) Jessica Chartrand (Canada) Cianna Lieffers

11 January 2020; 13:30	Team Green	4–6 (0–1, 3–1, 1–4)	Team Brown	Vaudoise aréna

Game reference
			Referees: (Canada) Jessica Chartrand (United Kingdom) Hollie Neenan
33	Shots	40	Referees: (Canada) Jessica Chartrand (United Kingdom) Hollie Neenan

11 January 2020; 13:30	Team Blue	7–4 (4–2, 2–1, 1–1)	Team Orange	Vaudoise aréna

Game reference
			Referees: (Canada) Cianna Lieffers (Sweden) Hanna Persson
61	Shots	45	Referees: (Canada) Cianna Lieffers (Sweden) Hanna Persson

11 January 2020; 19:00	Team Blue	8–4 (3–1, 3–2, 2–1)	Team Black	Vaudoise aréna

Game reference
			Referees: (United States) Melissa Doyle (Canada) Cianna Lieffers
57	Shots	40	Referees: (United States) Melissa Doyle (Canada) Cianna Lieffers

11 January 2020; 19:15	Team Yellow	8–3 (1–0, 3–3, 4–0)	Team Orange	Vaudoise aréna

Game reference
			Referees: (Canada) Jessica Chartrand (United Kingdom) Hollie Neenan
51	Shots	35	Referees: (Canada) Jessica Chartrand (United Kingdom) Hollie Neenan

11 January 2020; 20:45	Team Red	7–9 (2–1, 4–2, 1–6)	Team Green	Vaudoise aréna

Game reference
			Referees: (Canada) Jessica Chartrand (United States) Melissa Doyle
49	Shots	59	Referees: (Canada) Jessica Chartrand (United States) Melissa Doyle

11 January 2020; 20:45	Team Brown	7–9 (1–3, 5–3, 1–3)	Team Grey	Vaudoise aréna

Game reference
			Referees: (United Kingdom) Hollie Neenan (Sweden) Hanna Persson
38	Shots	33	Referees: (United Kingdom) Hollie Neenan (Sweden) Hanna Persson

12 January 2020; 12:00	Team Orange	4–10 (3–1, 0–6, 1–3)	Team Brown	Vaudoise aréna

Game reference
			Referees: (Canada) Jessica Chartrand (United States) Melissa Doyle
46	Shots	43	Referees: (Canada) Jessica Chartrand (United States) Melissa Doyle

12 January 2020; 12:00	Team Green	3–5 (0–2, 0–1, 3–2)	Team Blue	Vaudoise aréna

Game reference
			Referees: (United Kingdom) Hollie Neenan (Sweden) Hanna Persson
37	Shots	43	Referees: (United Kingdom) Hollie Neenan (Sweden) Hanna Persson

12 January 2020; 13:30	Team Black	7–2 (3–0, 2–1, 2–1)	Team Yellow	Vaudoise aréna

Game reference
			Referees: (Canada) Cianna Lieffers (Sweden) Hanna Persson
41	Shots	27	Referees: (Canada) Cianna Lieffers (Sweden) Hanna Persson

12 January 2020; 13:30	Team Red	5–8 (1–4, 2–2, 2–2)	Team Grey	Vaudoise aréna

Game reference
			Referees: (Canada) Jessica Chartrand (United Kingdom) Hollie Neenan
43	Shots	51	Referees: (Canada) Jessica Chartrand (United Kingdom) Hollie Neenan

12 January 2020; 19:00	Team Red	11–7 (3–1, 4–2, 4–4)	Team Brown	Vaudoise aréna

Game reference
			Referees: (Canada) Cianna Lieffers (Sweden) Hanna Persson
39	Shots	51	Referees: (Canada) Cianna Lieffers (Sweden) Hanna Persson

12 January 2020; 19:00	Team Grey	4–9 (3–2, 1–4, 0–3)	Team Green	Vaudoise aréna

Game reference
			Referees: (Canada) Jessica Chartrand (United States) Melissa Doyle
36	Shots	45	Referees: (Canada) Jessica Chartrand (United States) Melissa Doyle

12 January 2020; 20:30	Team Black	7–3 (4–1, 1–0, 2–2)	Team Orange	Vaudoise aréna

Game reference
			Referees: (Canada) Cianna Lieffers (United Kingdom) Hollie Neenan
45	Shots	40	Referees: (Canada) Cianna Lieffers (United Kingdom) Hollie Neenan

12 January 2020; 20:30	Team Blue	5–8 (0–5, 4–2, 1–1)	Team Yellow	Vaudoise aréna

Game reference
			Referees: (United States) Melissa Doyle (Sweden) Hanna Persson
39	Shots	44	Referees: (United States) Melissa Doyle (Sweden) Hanna Persson

13 January 2020; 12:00	Team Grey	3–5 (2–3, 1–2, 0–0)	Team Black	Vaudoise aréna

Game reference
			Referees: (Canada) Jessica Chartrand (United Kingdom) Hollie Neenan
38	Shots	32	Referees: (Canada) Jessica Chartrand (United Kingdom) Hollie Neenan

13 January 2020; 12:00	Team Yellow	5–8 (2–3, 1–3, 2–2)	Team Red	Vaudoise aréna

Game reference
			Referees: (United States) Melissa Doyle (Sweden) Hanna Persson
48	Shots	46	Referees: (United States) Melissa Doyle (Sweden) Hanna Persson

13 January 2020; 13:30	Team Brown	4–5 GWS (2–0, 1–0, 1–4) (SO: 0–1)	Team Blue	Vaudoise aréna

Game reference
			Referees: (Canada) Jessica Chartrand (United Kingdom) Hollie Neenan
36	Shots	41	Referees: (Canada) Jessica Chartrand (United Kingdom) Hollie Neenan

13 January 2020; 13:30	Team Orange	6–7 (3–2, 1–2, 2–3)	Team Green	Vaudoise aréna

Game reference
			Referees: (United States) Melissa Doyle (Canada) Cianna Lieffers
47	Shots	47	Referees: (United States) Melissa Doyle (Canada) Cianna Lieffers

13 January 2020; 19:00	Team Blue	4–5 GWS (1–1, 0–0, 3–3) (SO: 0–1)	Team Red	Vaudoise aréna

Game reference
			Referees: (Canada) Jessica Chartrand (United States) Melissa Doyle
52	Shots	39	Referees: (Canada) Jessica Chartrand (United States) Melissa Doyle

13 January 2020; 19:00	Team Orange	6–8 (3–2, 3–3, 0–3)	Team Grey	Vaudoise aréna

Game reference
			Referees: (Canada) Cianna Lieffers (Sweden) Hanna Persson
34	Shots	47	Referees: (Canada) Cianna Lieffers (Sweden) Hanna Persson

13 January 2020; 20:30	Team Green	4–9 (3–3, 1–5, 0–1)	Team Black	Vaudoise aréna

Game reference
			Referees: (Canada) Jessica Chartrand (Sweden) Hanna Persson
39	Shots	38	Referees: (Canada) Jessica Chartrand (Sweden) Hanna Persson

13 January 2020; 20:30	Team Brown	10–6 (4–1, 4–3, 2–2)	Team Yellow	Vaudoise aréna

Game reference
			Referees: (Canada) Cianna Lieffers (United Kingdom) Hollie Neenan
45	Shots	42	Referees: (Canada) Cianna Lieffers (United Kingdom) Hollie Neenan

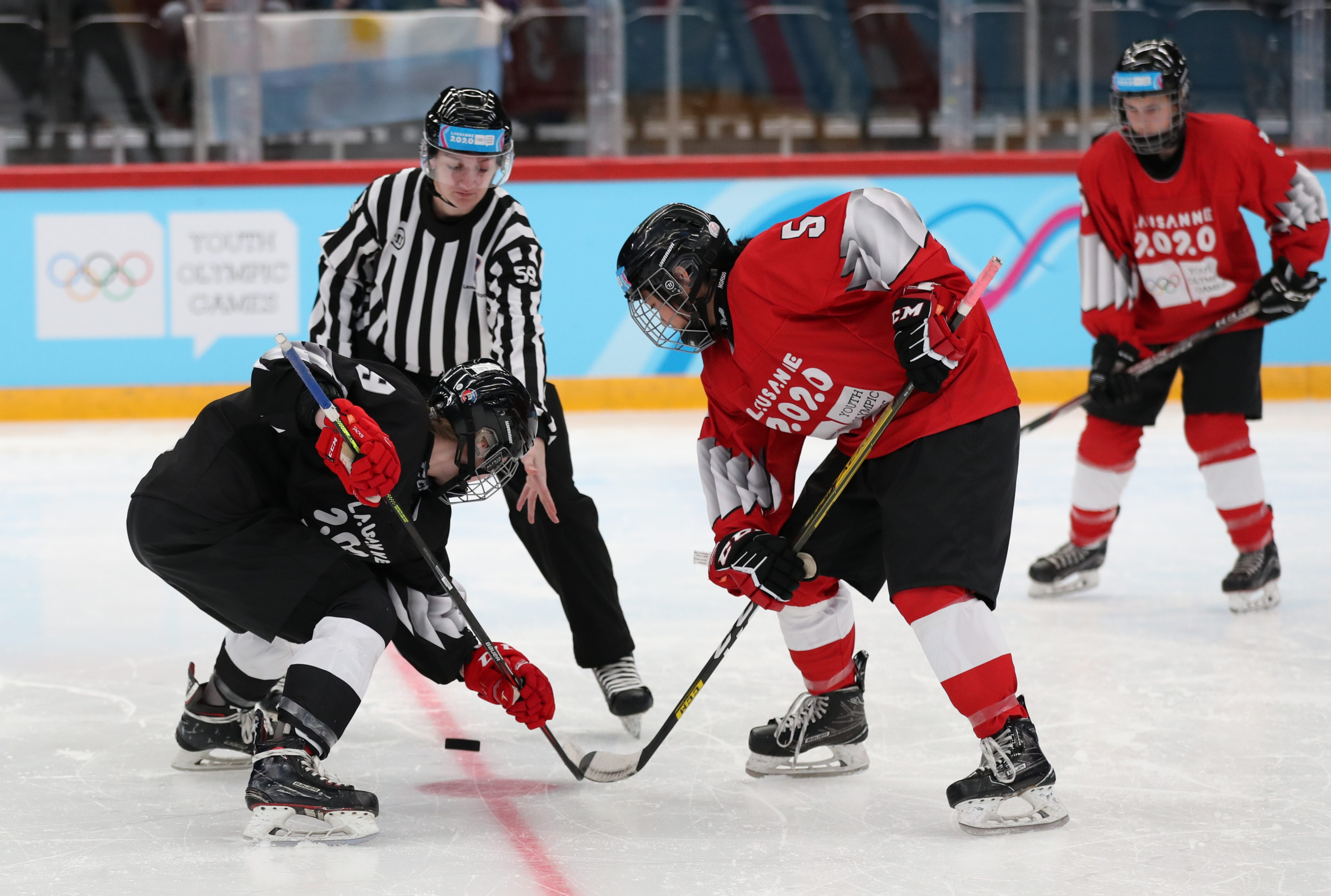
Face-off of Team Black and Team Red

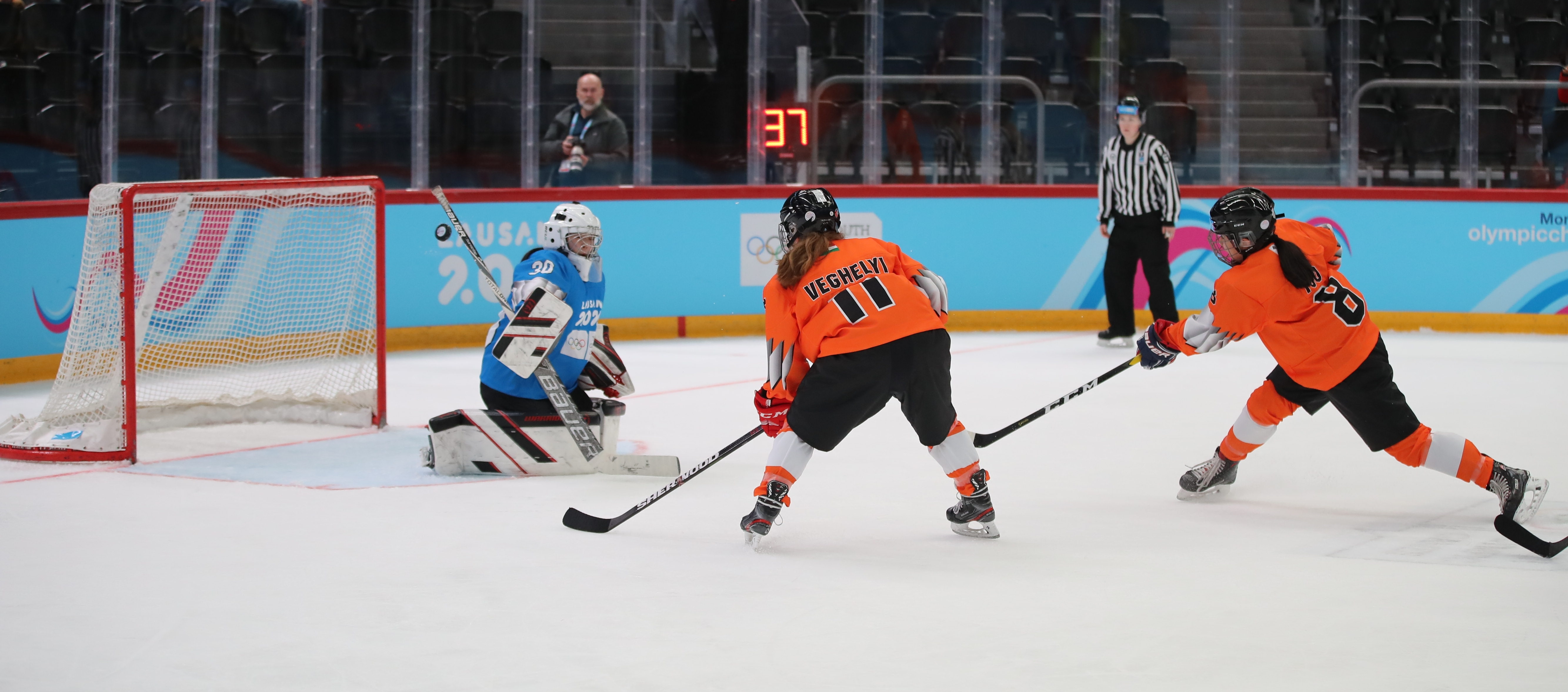
A shot of Team Orange passes the goalie of Team Blue

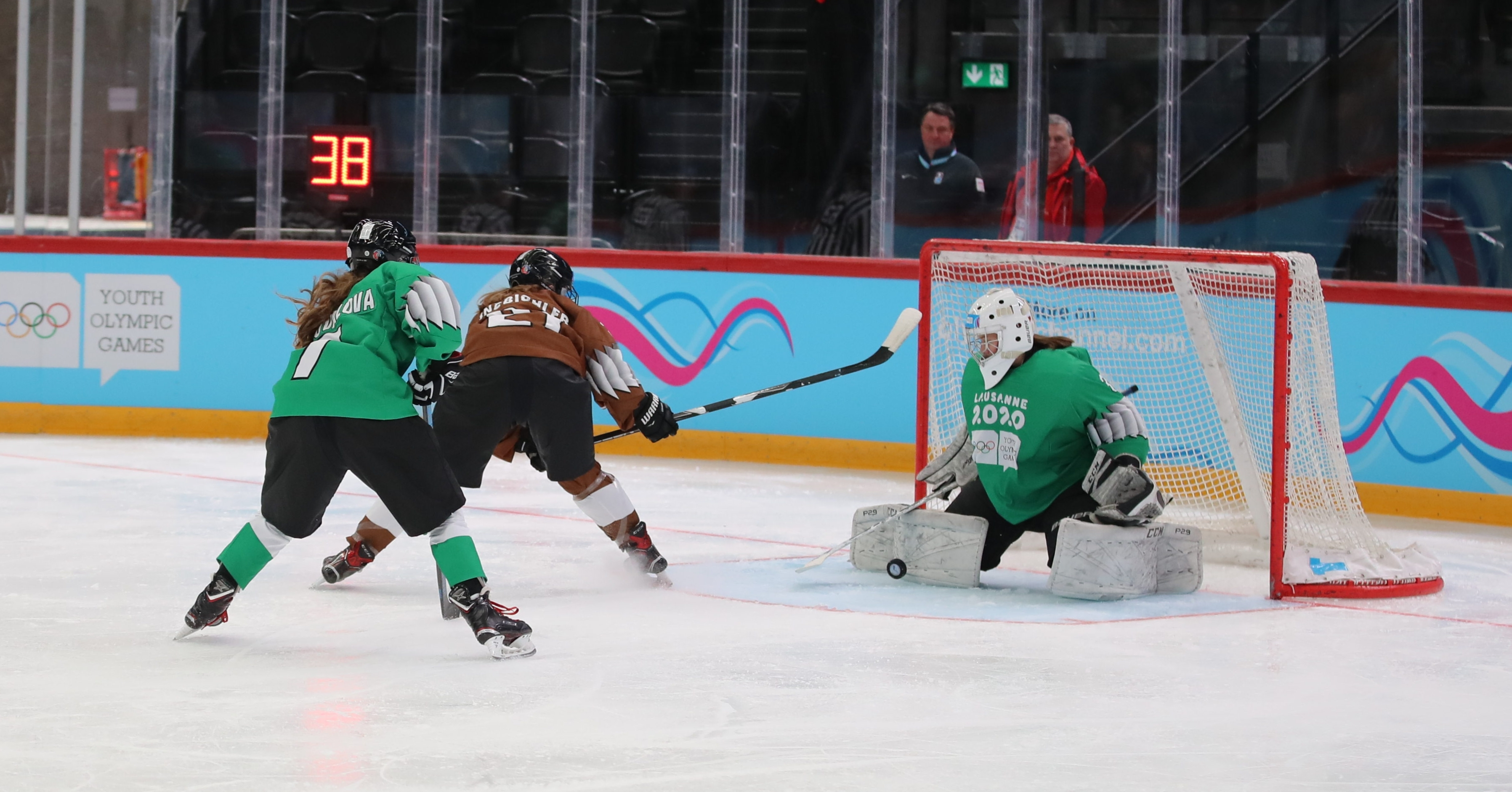
The goalie of Team Brown stops a shot by Team Green

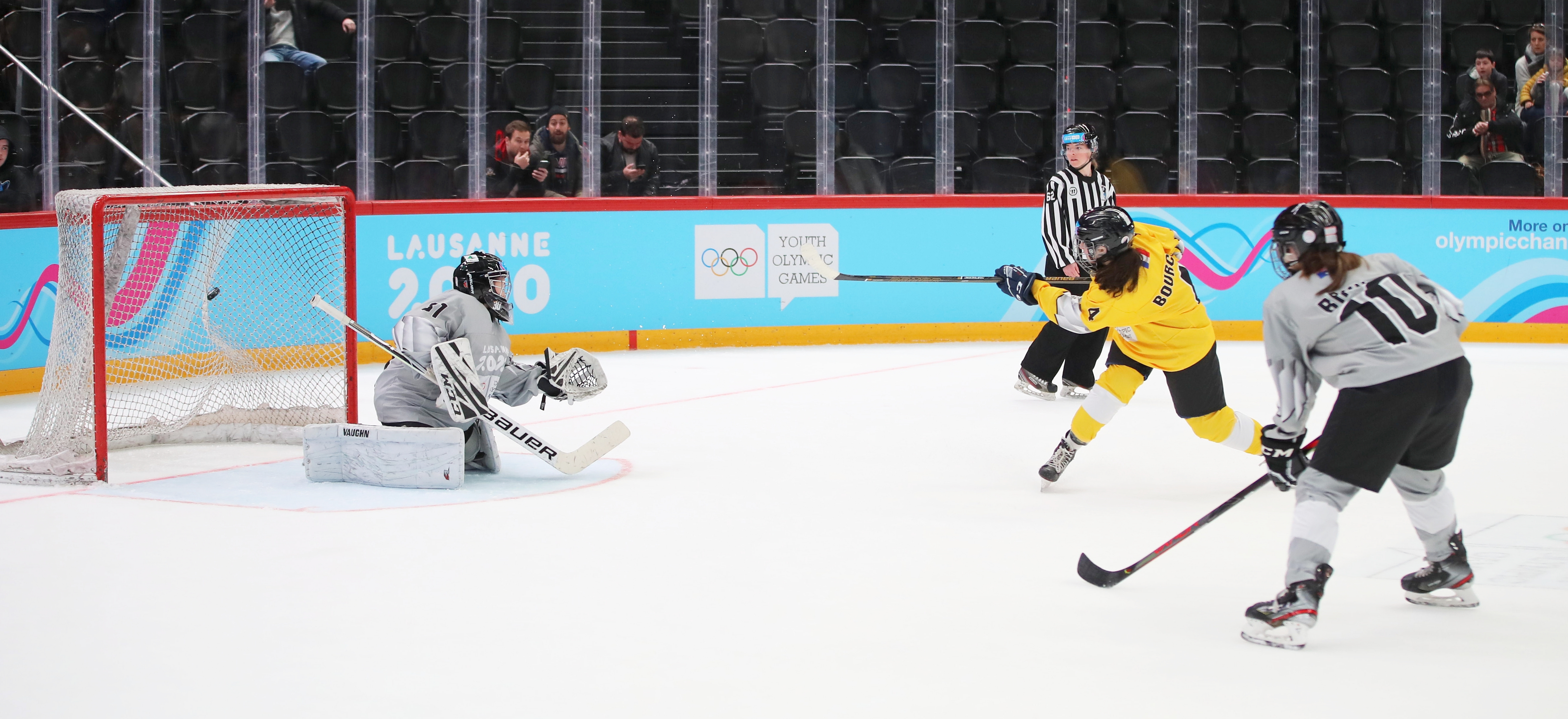
Team Yellow scores a goal against Team Grey

== Playoff round ==
=== Bracket ===
Semifinals
14 January
Team Black	11
Team Brown	7
14 January
Team Blue	5
Team Yellow	7

Final
15 January
Team Black	1
Team Yellow	6
Third place
15 January
Team Blue	6
Team Brown	4

=== Semifinals ===
14 January 2020; 12:00	Team Black	11–7 (3–5, 6–1, 2–1)	Team Brown	Vaudoise aréna

Game reference
			Referees: (Canada) Cianna Lieffers (United Kingdom) Hollie Neenan
32	Shots	42	Referees: (Canada) Cianna Lieffers (United Kingdom) Hollie Neenan

14 January 2020; 13:30	Team Blue	5–7 (0–2, 2–3, 3–2)	Team Yellow	Vaudoise aréna

Game reference
			Referees: (United States) Melissa Doyle (Sweden) Hanna Persson
41	Shots	55	Referees: (United States) Melissa Doyle (Sweden) Hanna Persson

=== Bronze medal game ===
15 January 2020; 12:00	(bronze) Team Blue	6–4 (4–0, 2–1, 0–3)	Team Brown	Vaudoise aréna

Game reference
			Referees: (Canada) Jessica Chartrand (United Kingdom) Hollie Neenan
50	Shots	35	Referees: (Canada) Jessica Chartrand (United Kingdom) Hollie Neenan

=== Gold medal game ===
15 January 2020; 13:30	(silver) Team Black	1–6 (1–1, 0–4, 0–1)	Team Yellow (gold)	Vaudoise aréna

Game reference
			Referees: (United States) Melissa Doyle (Canada) Cianna Lieffers
36	Shots	36	Referees: (United States) Melissa Doyle (Canada) Cianna Lieffers
