= Mexico at the 2020 Winter Youth Olympics =

- IOC code: MEX
- NOC: Mexican Olympic Committee

in Lausanne, Switzerland January 10–22
- Competitors: 7 in 2 sports
- Medals: Gold 0 Silver 0 Bronze 0 Total 0

Winter Youth Olympics appearances (overview)
- 2012; 2016; 2020; 2024

Mexico competed at the 2020 Winter Youth Olympics in Lausanne, Switzerland from 9 to 22 January 2020. They competed with 7 athletes in 2 sports. Luisa Wilson, who competed on the Yellow team of the Ice hockey – Girls' 3x3 mixed tournament, became the first Mexican to win a medal in any Winter Olympic sports category.

== Medalists ==
Medals awarded to participants of mixed-NOC teams are represented in italics. These medals are not counted towards the individual NOC medal tally.

Medal	Name	Sport	Event	Date
Gold	Luisa Wilson	Ice hockey	Girls' 3x3 mixed tournament	15 January

== Alpine skiing ==
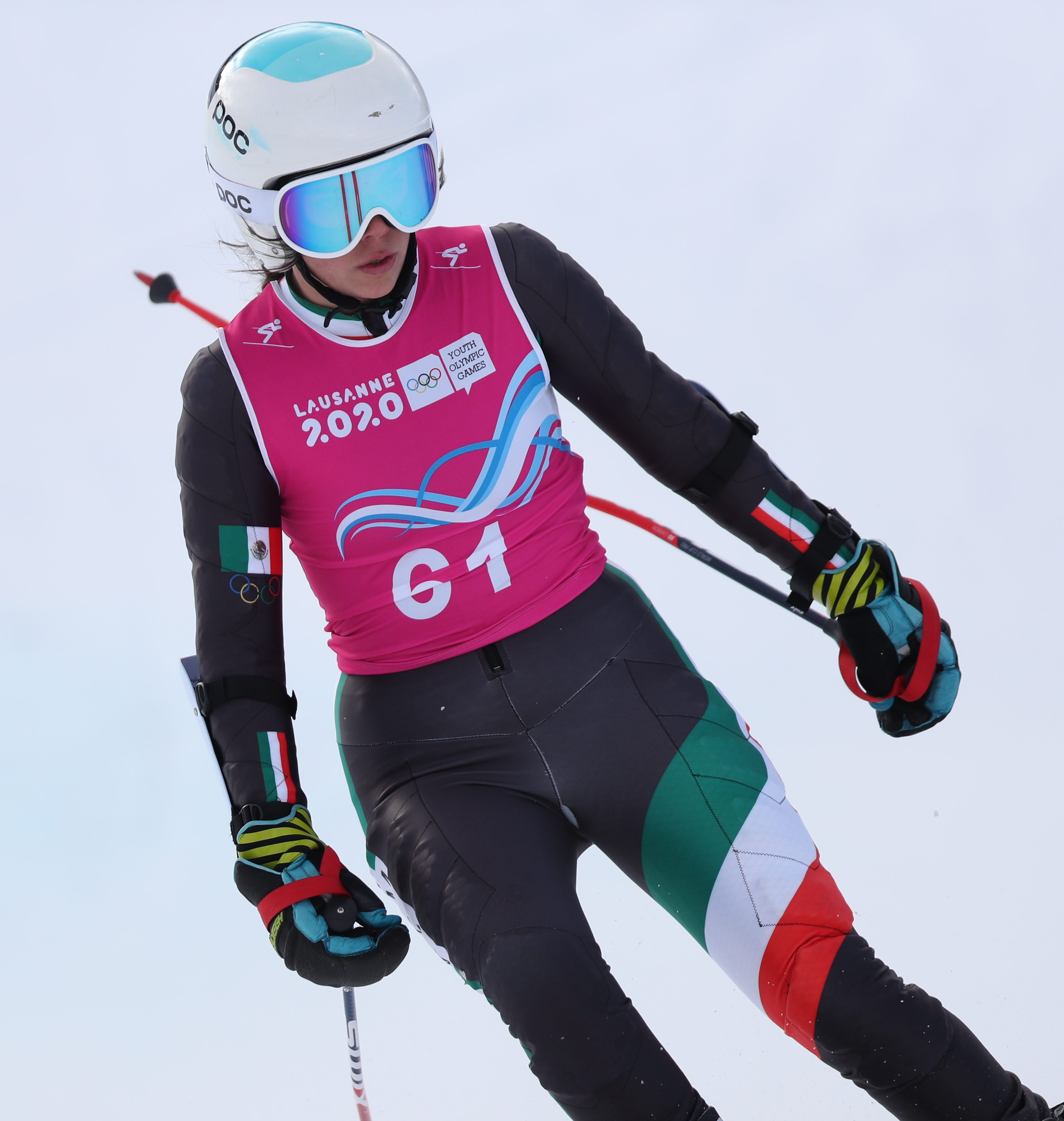
Daniela Payen during the super-G

Girls

Athlete	Event	Run 1		Run 2		Total	
Athlete	Event	Time	Rank	Time	Rank	Time	Rank
Daniela Payen	Super-G	—				1:06.17	49
Daniela Payen	Combined	1:06.17	49	DNF			
Daniela Payen	Giant slalom	1:18.22	47	DNF			
Daniela Payen	Slalom	DNF					

== Ice hockey ==
=== Mixed NOC 3x3 tournament ===
Boys

- Alejandro Javier
- Diego Rodríguez
- Daniel Valencia

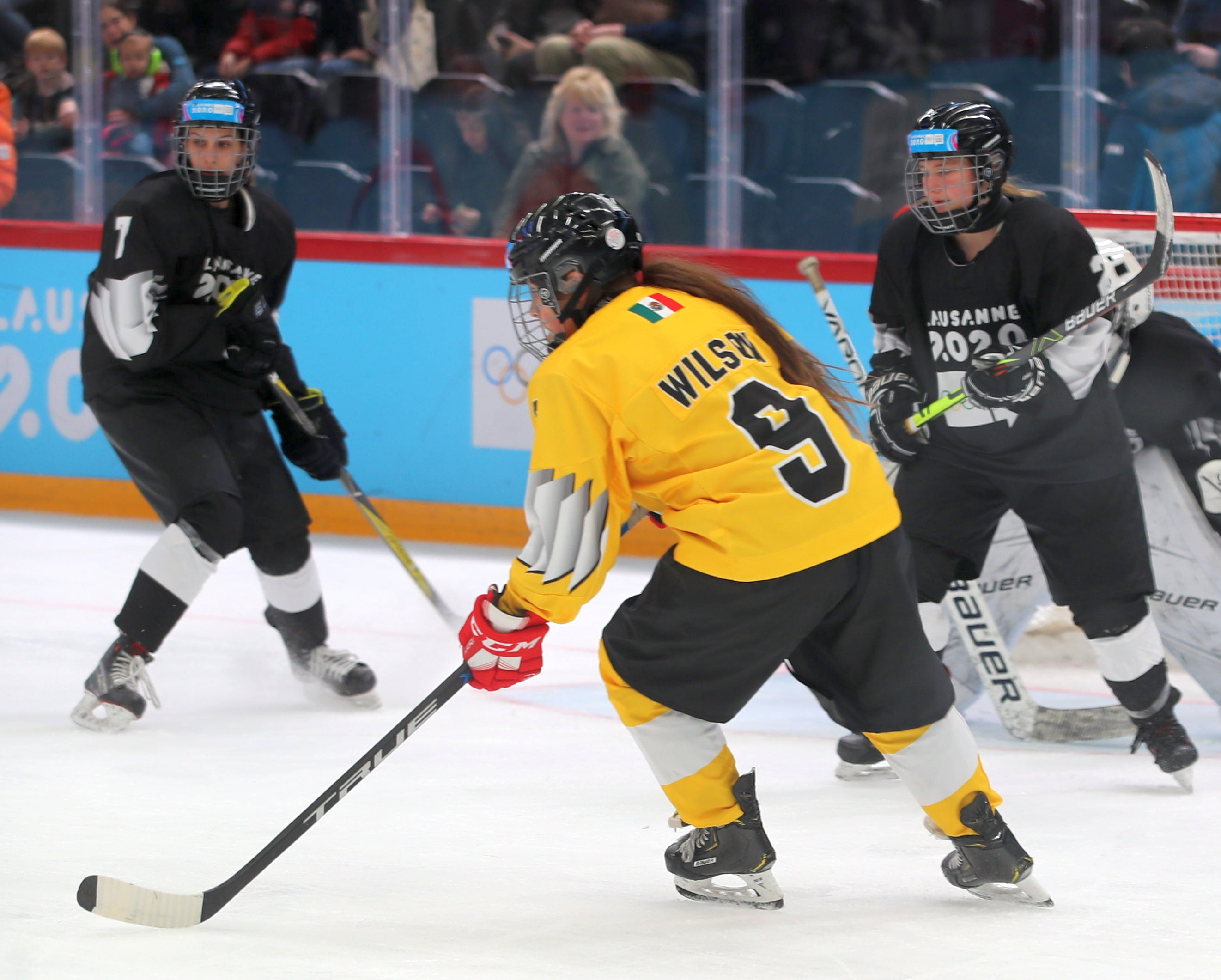
Luisa Wilson of Mexico at the won final of the Girls' 3x3 mixed Ice hockey tournament at the 2020 Winter Youth Olympics in Lausanne

Girls

- Ximena González
- Melanie Hernández
- Luisa Wilson

== See also ==
- Mexico at the 2020 Summer Olympics
