= Hong Kong at the 2020 Winter Youth Olympics =

- IOC code: HKG
- NOC: Sports Federation and Olympic Committee of Hong Kong, China

in Lausanne, Switzerland January 10–22
- Competitors: 4 in 2 sports
- Medals: Gold 0* Silver 0 Bronze 0* Total

Winter Youth Olympics appearances (overview)
- 2020; 2024

Hong Kong competed at the 2020 Winter Youth Olympics in Lausanne, Switzerland from 9 to 22 January 2020.

Hong Kong made its Winter Youth Olympics debut. The Hong Kong team consisted of four athletes (three men and one woman) competing in two sports: alpine skiing and hockey. Both hockey players would win medals as part of Mixed NOC teams.

== Medalists ==
Medals awarded to participants of mixed-NOC teams are represented in italics. These medals are not counted towards the individual NOC medal tally.

| Medal | Name | Sport | Event | Date |
|---|---|---|---|---|
| Gold | Yau Yam | Ice hockey | Boys' 3x3 mixed tournament | 15 January |
| Bronze | Elvis Hsu | Ice hockey | Boys' 3x3 mixed tournament | 15 January |

== Alpine skiing ==
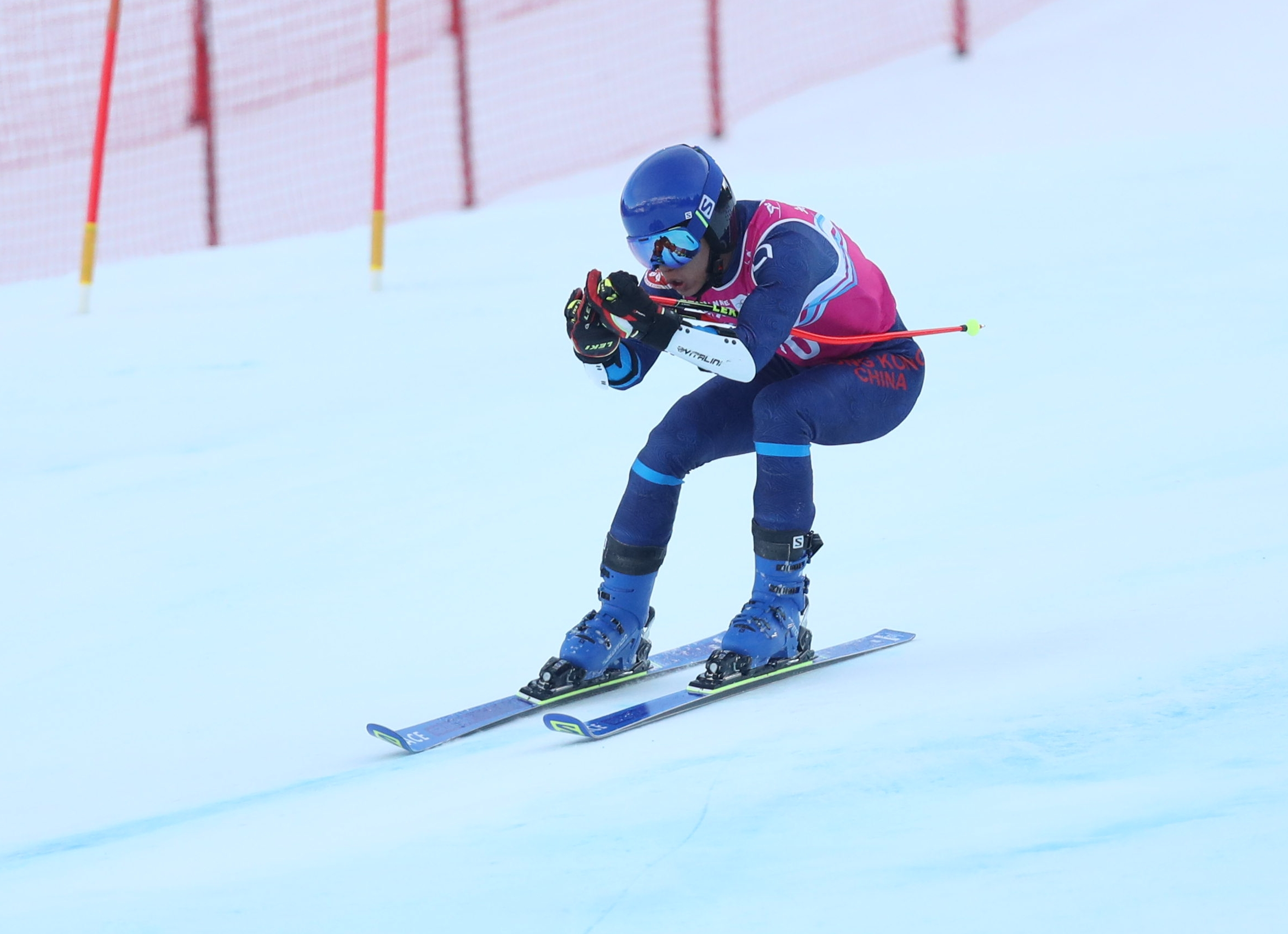
Miguel Chi Hung Almirall

| Athlete | Event | Run 1 | | Run 2 | | Total | |
| Athlete | Event | Time | Rank | Time | Rank | Time | Rank |
|---|---|---|---|---|---|---|---|
| Miguel Almirall Perez | Boys' giant slalom | 1:14.85 | 50 | 1:14.01 | 44 | 2:28.86 | 44 |
| Miguel Almirall Perez | Boys' slalom | DNF | | | | | |
| Audrey Alice King | Girls' giant slalom | DNF | | | | | |
| Audrey Alice King | Girls' slalom | 1:02.12 | 39 | 1:00.58 | 32 | 2:02.70 | 32 |

== Ice hockey ==
=== Mixed NOC 3x3 tournament ===
Boys - Brown Team

- Chuo Xi Elvis Hsu - Bronze Medal

Boys - Green Team

- Yau Yam - Gold Medal

== See also ==
- Hong Kong at the 2020 Summer Olympics
