= Turkmenistan at the 2020 Winter Youth Olympics =

- IOC code: TKM
- NOC: National Olympic Committee of Turkmenistan

in Lausanne
- Competitors: 1 in 1 sport
- Flag bearer: Nowruz Baýhanow
- Medals: Gold 0 Silver 0 Bronze 0 Total 0

Winter Youth Olympics appearances (overview)
- 2020; 2024

Turkmenistan competed at the 2020 Winter Youth Olympics in Lausanne, Switzerland from 9 to 22 January 2020. This was also the first time that Turkmenistan competed at the Winter Youth Olympic Games.

Turkmenistan made its Winter Youth Olympics debut.

== Ice hockey ==
=== Mixed NOC 3x3 tournament ===
Boys

- Nowruz Baýhanow

== See also ==
- Turkmenistan at the 2020 Summer Olympics
