= Qatar at the 2020 Winter Youth Olympics =

- IOC code: QAT
- NOC: Qatar Olympic Committee
- Website: www.olympic.qa

in Lausanne
- Competitors: 1 in 1 sport
- Flag bearer: Thawab Al-Subaey
- Medals: Gold 0 Silver 0 Bronze 0 Total 0

Winter Youth Olympics appearances
- 2012; 2016; 2020; 2024

Qatar competed at the 2020 Winter Youth Olympics in Lausanne, Switzerland from 9 to 22 January 2020.

Qatar's team consisted of one male hockey player competing in the mixed NOC 3x3 tournament. This marked the country's debut at a Winter Olympics.

== Ice hockey ==
=== Mixed NOC 3x3 tournament ===
Boys

- Thawab Al-Subaey

== See also ==
- Qatar at the 2020 Summer Olympics
