= Ukraine at the 2020 Winter Youth Olympics =

- IOC code: UKR
- NOC: National Olympic Committee of Ukraine
- Website: www.noc-ukr.org

in Lausanne
- Competitors: 39 in 12 sports
- Medals Ranked 29th: Gold 0 Silver 0 Bronze 1 Total 1

Winter Youth Olympics appearances (overview)
- 2012; 2016; 2020; 2024

Ukraine competed at the 2020 Winter Youth Olympics in Lausanne, Switzerland from 9 to 22 January 2020.

Yulianna Tunytska (luge) represented Ukraine at the 2022 and 2026 Winter Olympics. Artem Darenskyi (figure skating) and Anton Korchuk (ski jumping) qualified to represent Ukraine at the 2022 Winter Olympics. Vitalii Mandzyn (biathlon), Oleksandr Lisohor and Anastasiia Nikon (both — cross-country skiing), Bohdan Babura and Oleksandra Mokh (both — luge) represented Ukraine at the 2026 Winter Olympics.

== Medalists ==
Medal	Name	Sport	Event	Date
Bronze	Orest Kovalenko	Freestyle skiing	Boys' Big Air	22 January

=== Medals in Mixed-NOC events ===
Medals awarded to participants of mixed-NOC are not counted towards the individual NOC medal tally.

Medal	Name	Sport	Event	Date
Gold	Volodymyr Troshkin	Ice hockey	Boys' 3x3 mixed tournament	15 January
Silver	Denis Pasko	Ice hockey	Boys' 3x3 mixed tournament	15 January
Bronze	Sofiia Nesterova; Artem Darenskyi	Figure skating	Team trophy	15 January

== Competitors ==
The following is the list of number of competitors participating at the Games per sport.

Sport	Men	Women	Total
Alpine skiing	1	1	2
Biathlon	4	4	8
Cross-country skiing	2	2	4
Figure skating	3	2	5
Freestyle skiing	1	—	1
Ice hockey	2	1	3
Luge	3	3	6
Nordic combined	2	—	2
Short track speed skating	1	1	2
Skeleton	—	1	1
Ski jumping	2	2	4
Snowboarding	1	—	1
Total	22	17	39

== Alpine skiing ==
Boys

Athlete	Event	Run 1		Run 2		Total	
Athlete	Event	Time	Rank	Time	Rank	Time	Rank
Taras Filiak	Super-G	—N/a				57.60	35
Taras Filiak	Combined	57.60	35	37.54	32	1:35.14	29
Taras Filiak	Giant slalom	1:09.56	38	1:09.19	29	2:18.75	32
Taras Filiak	Slalom	40.66	30	42.66	24	1:23.32	23

Girls

Athlete	Event	Run 1		Run 2		Total	
Athlete	Event	Time	Rank	Time	Rank	Time	Rank
Kateryna Shepilenko	Super-G	—N/a				1:04.14	44
Kateryna Shepilenko	Combined	1:04.14	44	42.88	30	1:47.02	31
Kateryna Shepilenko	Giant slalom	1:13.69	42	DSQ			
Kateryna Shepilenko	Slalom	DNF1					

== Biathlon ==
Boys

Athlete	Event	Time	Misses	Rank
Stepan Kinash	Sprint	20:08.0	1 (0+1)	8
Stepan Kinash	Individual	35:58.7	3 (0+1+0+2)	8
Mark Kozak	Sprint	21:11.3	3 (0+3)	22
Mark Kozak	Individual	37:48.1	4 (2+0+1+1)	20
Serhii Kryshtal	Sprint	23:07.3	4 (1+3)	61
Serhii Kryshtal	Individual	40:45.5	7 (4+2+0+1)	57
Vitalii Mandzyn	Sprint	19:59.8	1 (1+0)	5
Vitalii Mandzyn	Individual	39:44.6	6 (1+2+0+3)	48

Girls

Athlete	Event	Time	Misses	Rank
Tetiana Prodan	Sprint	20:24.6	2 (0+2)	28
Tetiana Prodan	Individual	38:36.5	6 (0+2+2+2)	44
Daria Skriabina	Sprint	21:41.2	3 (0+3)	57
Daria Skriabina	Individual	39:14.8	6 (0+3+0+3)	51
Hanna Skrypko	Sprint	20:41.2	1 (1+0)	32
Hanna Skrypko	Individual	37:25.3	4 (2+0+1+1)	27
Viktoriia Zhukovska	Sprint	21:34.7	1 (1+0)	53
Viktoriia Zhukovska	Individual	39:37.5	4 (1+1+1+1)	53

Mixed

Athletes	Event	Time	Misses	Rank
Hanna Skrypko; Stepan Kinash	Single mixed relay	43:06.8	0+8	6
Hanna Skrypko; Tetiana Prodan; Stepan Kinash; Vitalii Mandzyn	Mixed relay	1:14:46.8	0+10	8

== Cross-country skiing ==
Distance

Athlete	Event	Time	Rank
Volodymyr Aksiuta	Boys' 10 km classical	30:00.2	36
Oleksandr Lisohor	Boys' 10 km classical	30:18.0	41
Anastasiia Nikon	Girls 5 km classical	16:58.2	49
Anastasiia Kompaniiets	Girls 5 km classical	17:10.2	51

Sprint

Athlete	Event	Qualification		Quarterfinal		Semifinal		Final	
Athlete	Event	Time	Rank	Time	Rank	Time	Rank	Time	Rank
Oleksandr Lisohor	Boys'	3:23.95	20 Q	3:51.41	6	did not advance			
Volodymyr Aksiuta	Boys'	3:37.46	52	did not advance					
Anastasiia Kompaniiets	Girls'	3:01.84	36	did not advance					
Anastasiia Nikon	Girls'	3:13.20	57	did not advance					

Cross

Athlete	Event	Qualification		Semifinal		Final	
Athlete	Event	Time	Rank	Time	Rank	Time	Rank
Oleksandr Lisohor	Boys'	4:31.80	19 Q	4:24.86	5	did not advance	
Volodymyr Aksiuta	Boys'	4:47.80	51	did not advance			
Anastasiia Kompaniiets	Girls'	5:55.11	54	did not advance			
Anastasiia Nikon	Girls'	6:02.64	61	did not advance			

== Figure skating ==
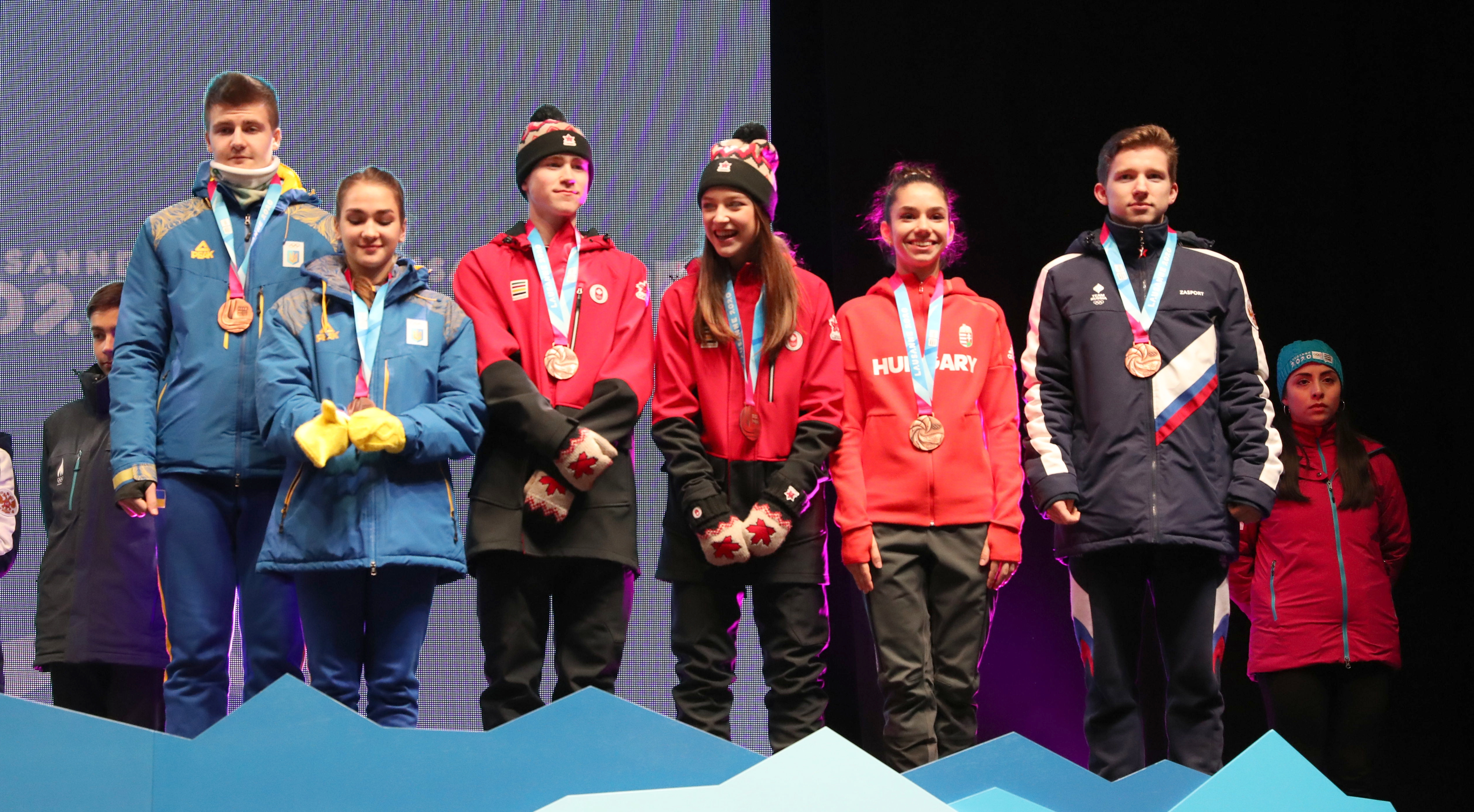
Team "Vision" at the medal ceremony of the Mixed-NOCs team trophy.

Four Ukrainian figure skaters achieved quota places for Ukraine based on the results of the 2019 World Junior Figure Skating Championships. Ukraine also received one men's singles quota based on the results of the 2019–20 ISU Junior Grand Prix.

Singles

Athletes	Event	SP/SD		FS/FD		Total	
Athletes	Event	Points	Rank	Points	Rank	Points	Rank
Andrey Kokura	Boys' singles	62.48	6	109.20	10	171.68	9

Couples

Athletes	Event	SP/SD		FS/FD		Total	
Athletes	Event	Points	Rank	Points	Rank	Points	Rank
Sofiia Nesterova / Artem Darenskyi	Pairs	45.82	7	82.65	7	128.47	7
Anna Cherniavska / Oleg Muratov	Ice dancing	52.24	7	69.37	8	131.61	7

Mixed NOC team trophy

Athletes	Event	Free skate/Free dance					
Athletes	Event	Ice dance	Pairs	Girls	Boys	Total	
Athletes	Event	Points Team points	Points Team points	Points Team points	Points Team points	Points	Rank
Team Vision; Natalie D'Alessandro / Bruce Waddell (CAN); Sofiia Nesterova / Artem Darenskyi (UKR); Regina Schermann (HUN); Andrei Mozalev (RUS)	Team trophy	95.73; 6	86.53; 2	95.37; 3	154.97; 7	18	3rd place, bronze medalist(s)
Team Future; Anna Cherniavska / Oleg Muratov (UKR); Wang Yuchen / Huang Yihang (CHN); Anna Frolova (RUS); Matteo Nalbone (ITA)	Team trophy	80.86; 3	91.35; 4	126.00; 7	73.89; 1	15	7
Team Motivation; Gina Zehnder / Beda-Leon Sieber (SUI); Diana Mukhametzianova / Ilya Mironov (RUS); Alessia Tornaghi (ITA); Andrey Kokura (UKR)	Team trophy	60.87; 1	101.89; 7	125.22; 6	100.38; 3	17	5

== Freestyle skiing ==
Athlete	Event	Semifinal		Final	
Athlete	Event	Score	Rank	Score	Rank
Orest Kovalenko	Big air	83.00	5 Q	179.50	3rd place, bronze medalist(s)
Orest Kovalenko	Slopestyle	71.33	7 Q	70.00	9

== Ice hockey ==
3x3 mixed tournament

Team	Players	Bracket		Semifinals		Finals		Rank
Team	Players	Opponent	Result	Opponent	Result	Opponent	Result	Rank
Boys
Team Green	Nicolas Elgas (LUX); Artyom Pronichkin (RUS); Nathan Nicoud (FRA); Volodymyr Troshkin (UKR); Pablo González (ESP); Maks Perčič (SLO); Yam Yau (HKG); Alessandro Segafredo (ITA); Ilya Korzun (BLR); Marek Potšinok (EST); Patrik Dalen (NOR); Levente Hegedűs (HUN); Štěpán Maleček (CZE)	Team Yellow	10:5	Team Black	7:3	Team Red	10:4	1st place, gold medalist(s)
Team Green	Nicolas Elgas (LUX); Artyom Pronichkin (RUS); Nathan Nicoud (FRA); Volodymyr Troshkin (UKR); Pablo González (ESP); Maks Perčič (SLO); Yam Yau (HKG); Alessandro Segafredo (ITA); Ilya Korzun (BLR); Marek Potšinok (EST); Patrik Dalen (NOR); Levente Hegedűs (HUN); Štěpán Maleček (CZE)	Team Brown	8:6	Team Black	7:3	Team Red	10:4	1st place, gold medalist(s)
Team Green	Nicolas Elgas (LUX); Artyom Pronichkin (RUS); Nathan Nicoud (FRA); Volodymyr Troshkin (UKR); Pablo González (ESP); Maks Perčič (SLO); Yam Yau (HKG); Alessandro Segafredo (ITA); Ilya Korzun (BLR); Marek Potšinok (EST); Patrik Dalen (NOR); Levente Hegedűs (HUN); Štěpán Maleček (CZE)	Team Red	9:8 GWS	Team Black	7:3	Team Red	10:4	1st place, gold medalist(s)
Team Green	Nicolas Elgas (LUX); Artyom Pronichkin (RUS); Nathan Nicoud (FRA); Volodymyr Troshkin (UKR); Pablo González (ESP); Maks Perčič (SLO); Yam Yau (HKG); Alessandro Segafredo (ITA); Ilya Korzun (BLR); Marek Potšinok (EST); Patrik Dalen (NOR); Levente Hegedűs (HUN); Štěpán Maleček (CZE)	Team Blue	11:6	Team Black	7:3	Team Red	10:4	1st place, gold medalist(s)
Team Green	Nicolas Elgas (LUX); Artyom Pronichkin (RUS); Nathan Nicoud (FRA); Volodymyr Troshkin (UKR); Pablo González (ESP); Maks Perčič (SLO); Yam Yau (HKG); Alessandro Segafredo (ITA); Ilya Korzun (BLR); Marek Potšinok (EST); Patrik Dalen (NOR); Levente Hegedűs (HUN); Štěpán Maleček (CZE)	Team Grey	14:6	Team Black	7:3	Team Red	10:4	1st place, gold medalist(s)
Team Green	Nicolas Elgas (LUX); Artyom Pronichkin (RUS); Nathan Nicoud (FRA); Volodymyr Troshkin (UKR); Pablo González (ESP); Maks Perčič (SLO); Yam Yau (HKG); Alessandro Segafredo (ITA); Ilya Korzun (BLR); Marek Potšinok (EST); Patrik Dalen (NOR); Levente Hegedűs (HUN); Štěpán Maleček (CZE)	Team Orange	8:6	Team Black	7:3	Team Red	10:4	1st place, gold medalist(s)
Team Green	Nicolas Elgas (LUX); Artyom Pronichkin (RUS); Nathan Nicoud (FRA); Volodymyr Troshkin (UKR); Pablo González (ESP); Maks Perčič (SLO); Yam Yau (HKG); Alessandro Segafredo (ITA); Ilya Korzun (BLR); Marek Potšinok (EST); Patrik Dalen (NOR); Levente Hegedűs (HUN); Štěpán Maleček (CZE)	Team Black	4:6	Team Black	7:3	Team Red	10:4	1st place, gold medalist(s)
Team Red	Juho Lukkari (FIN); Denis Pasko (UKR); Lin Wei-yu (TPE); Aleks Menc (POL); Matija Dinić (SRB); Peter Repčík (SVK); Mackenzie Stewart (GBR); Dylan Wesseling (NED); Tjaš Lesničar (SLO); Sander Salvær (NOR); Jan Hornecker (SUI); Matthias Bittner (GER); Maël Halladj (FRA)	Team Orange	6:8	Team Brown	9:7	Team Green	4:10	2nd place, silver medalist(s)
Team Red	Juho Lukkari (FIN); Denis Pasko (UKR); Lin Wei-yu (TPE); Aleks Menc (POL); Matija Dinić (SRB); Peter Repčík (SVK); Mackenzie Stewart (GBR); Dylan Wesseling (NED); Tjaš Lesničar (SLO); Sander Salvær (NOR); Jan Hornecker (SUI); Matthias Bittner (GER); Maël Halladj (FRA)	Team Black	12:9	Team Brown	9:7	Team Green	4:10	2nd place, silver medalist(s)
Team Red	Juho Lukkari (FIN); Denis Pasko (UKR); Lin Wei-yu (TPE); Aleks Menc (POL); Matija Dinić (SRB); Peter Repčík (SVK); Mackenzie Stewart (GBR); Dylan Wesseling (NED); Tjaš Lesničar (SLO); Sander Salvær (NOR); Jan Hornecker (SUI); Matthias Bittner (GER); Maël Halladj (FRA)	Team Green	8:9 GWS	Team Brown	9:7	Team Green	4:10	2nd place, silver medalist(s)
Team Red	Juho Lukkari (FIN); Denis Pasko (UKR); Lin Wei-yu (TPE); Aleks Menc (POL); Matija Dinić (SRB); Peter Repčík (SVK); Mackenzie Stewart (GBR); Dylan Wesseling (NED); Tjaš Lesničar (SLO); Sander Salvær (NOR); Jan Hornecker (SUI); Matthias Bittner (GER); Maël Halladj (FRA)	Team Grey	9:13	Team Brown	9:7	Team Green	4:10	2nd place, silver medalist(s)
Team Red	Juho Lukkari (FIN); Denis Pasko (UKR); Lin Wei-yu (TPE); Aleks Menc (POL); Matija Dinić (SRB); Peter Repčík (SVK); Mackenzie Stewart (GBR); Dylan Wesseling (NED); Tjaš Lesničar (SLO); Sander Salvær (NOR); Jan Hornecker (SUI); Matthias Bittner (GER); Maël Halladj (FRA)	Team Brown	11:5	Team Brown	9:7	Team Green	4:10	2nd place, silver medalist(s)
Team Red	Juho Lukkari (FIN); Denis Pasko (UKR); Lin Wei-yu (TPE); Aleks Menc (POL); Matija Dinić (SRB); Peter Repčík (SVK); Mackenzie Stewart (GBR); Dylan Wesseling (NED); Tjaš Lesničar (SLO); Sander Salvær (NOR); Jan Hornecker (SUI); Matthias Bittner (GER); Maël Halladj (FRA)	Team Yellow	15:13	Team Brown	9:7	Team Green	4:10	2nd place, silver medalist(s)
Team Red	Juho Lukkari (FIN); Denis Pasko (UKR); Lin Wei-yu (TPE); Aleks Menc (POL); Matija Dinić (SRB); Peter Repčík (SVK); Mackenzie Stewart (GBR); Dylan Wesseling (NED); Tjaš Lesničar (SLO); Sander Salvær (NOR); Jan Hornecker (SUI); Matthias Bittner (GER); Maël Halladj (FRA)	Team Blue	18:11	Team Brown	9:7	Team Green	4:10	2nd place, silver medalist(s)
Girls
Team Orange	Polina Lubenets (UKR); Wang Meihe (CHN); Sanne Claessens (NED); Saskia Rohregger (ITA); Isabel Walberg (NOR); Molly Lukowiak (AUS); Yoo Seo-young (KOR); Nadia Sancha (ESP); Sena Hasegawa (JPN); Dóra Véghelyi (HUN); Emma Hofbauer (AUT); Yulia Volkova (RUS); Kristina Chernova (KAZ)	Team Red	8:6	DNQ				8
Team Orange	Polina Lubenets (UKR); Wang Meihe (CHN); Sanne Claessens (NED); Saskia Rohregger (ITA); Isabel Walberg (NOR); Molly Lukowiak (AUS); Yoo Seo-young (KOR); Nadia Sancha (ESP); Sena Hasegawa (JPN); Dóra Véghelyi (HUN); Emma Hofbauer (AUT); Yulia Volkova (RUS); Kristina Chernova (KAZ)	Team Blue	12:1	DNQ				8
Team Orange	Polina Lubenets (UKR); Wang Meihe (CHN); Sanne Claessens (NED); Saskia Rohregger (ITA); Isabel Walberg (NOR); Molly Lukowiak (AUS); Yoo Seo-young (KOR); Nadia Sancha (ESP); Sena Hasegawa (JPN); Dóra Véghelyi (HUN); Emma Hofbauer (AUT); Yulia Volkova (RUS); Kristina Chernova (KAZ)	Team Yellow	4:9	DNQ				8
Team Orange	Polina Lubenets (UKR); Wang Meihe (CHN); Sanne Claessens (NED); Saskia Rohregger (ITA); Isabel Walberg (NOR); Molly Lukowiak (AUS); Yoo Seo-young (KOR); Nadia Sancha (ESP); Sena Hasegawa (JPN); Dóra Véghelyi (HUN); Emma Hofbauer (AUT); Yulia Volkova (RUS); Kristina Chernova (KAZ)	Team Brown	10:14	DNQ				8
Team Orange	Polina Lubenets (UKR); Wang Meihe (CHN); Sanne Claessens (NED); Saskia Rohregger (ITA); Isabel Walberg (NOR); Molly Lukowiak (AUS); Yoo Seo-young (KOR); Nadia Sancha (ESP); Sena Hasegawa (JPN); Dóra Véghelyi (HUN); Emma Hofbauer (AUT); Yulia Volkova (RUS); Kristina Chernova (KAZ)	Team Black	14:8	DNQ				8
Team Orange	Polina Lubenets (UKR); Wang Meihe (CHN); Sanne Claessens (NED); Saskia Rohregger (ITA); Isabel Walberg (NOR); Molly Lukowiak (AUS); Yoo Seo-young (KOR); Nadia Sancha (ESP); Sena Hasegawa (JPN); Dóra Véghelyi (HUN); Emma Hofbauer (AUT); Yulia Volkova (RUS); Kristina Chernova (KAZ)	Team Green	6:8	DNQ				8
Team Orange	Polina Lubenets (UKR); Wang Meihe (CHN); Sanne Claessens (NED); Saskia Rohregger (ITA); Isabel Walberg (NOR); Molly Lukowiak (AUS); Yoo Seo-young (KOR); Nadia Sancha (ESP); Sena Hasegawa (JPN); Dóra Véghelyi (HUN); Emma Hofbauer (AUT); Yulia Volkova (RUS); Kristina Chernova (KAZ)	Team Grey	2:5	DNQ				8

== Luge ==
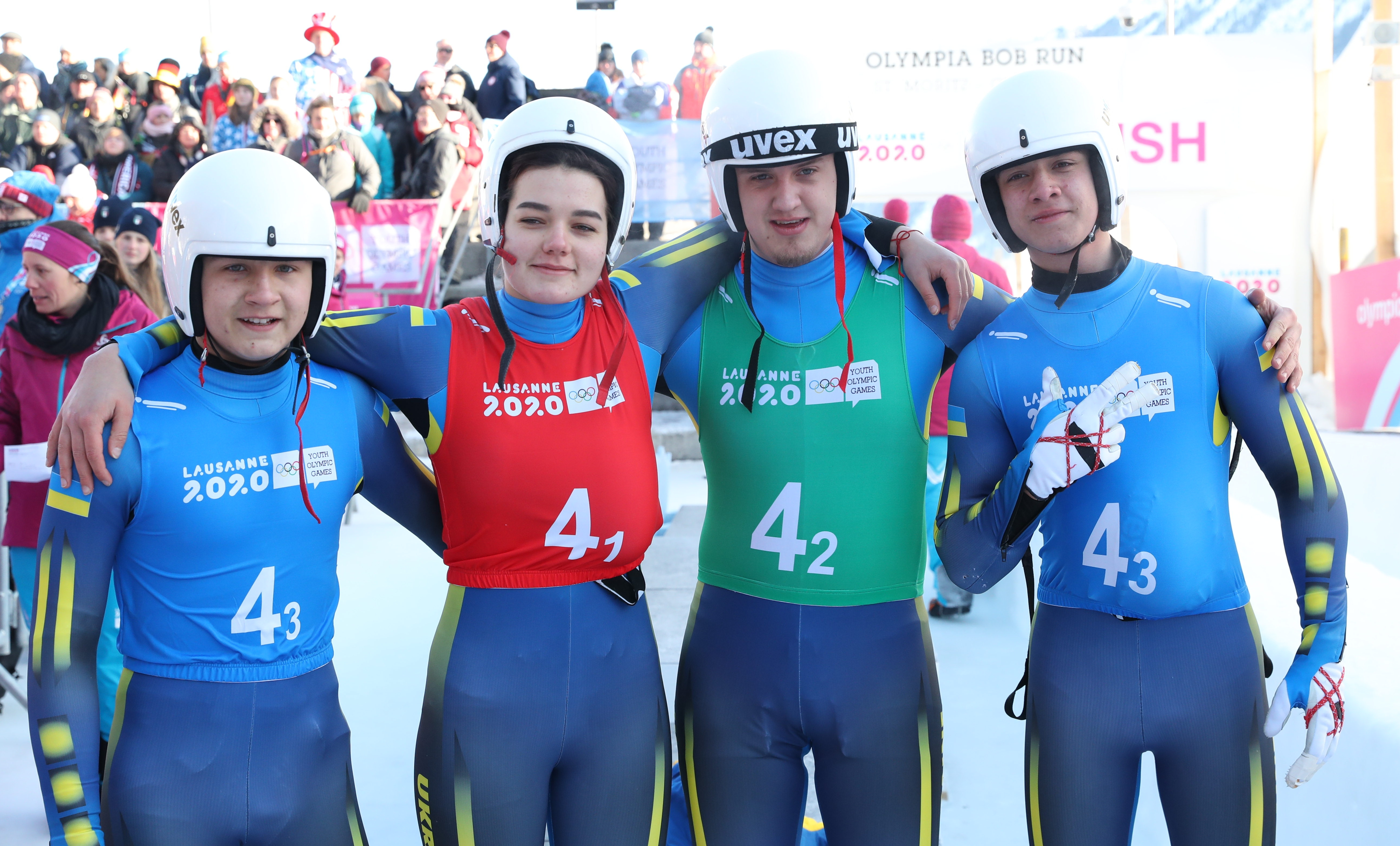
Ukrainian team in the mixed relay.

Boys

Athlete	Event	Final			
Athlete	Event	Run 1	Run 2	Total	Rank
Oleh-Roman Pylypiv	Boys' singles	55.446	55.293	1:50.739	13
Vadym Mykyievych; Bohdan Babura	Boys' doubles	-	-	-	DSQ

Girls

Athlete	Event	Final			
Athlete	Event	Run 1	Run 2	Total	Rank
Yulianna Tunytska	Girls' singles	55.425	55.151	1:50.576	5
Nadiia Antoniuk; Oleksandra Mokh	Girls' doubles	56.773	58.530	1:55.303	10

Team

Athlete	Event	Final				
Athlete	Event	Boys'	Girls'	Doubles	Total	Rank
Yulianna Tunytska; Oleh-Roman Pylypiv; Vadym Mykyievych / Bohdan Babura	Team Relay	57.766	59.748	1:01.230	2:58.744	6

== Nordic combined ==
Athlete	Event	Ski jumping				Cross-country skiing		Combined result		
Athlete	Event	Distance	Points	Deficit	Rank	Time	Rank	Finish time	Deficit	Rank
Andrii Pylypchuk	Boys' NH/6 km	79.5	95.7	+1:40	21	16:10.3	23	17:50.3	+3:04.5	21
Valentin Yashchuk	Boys' NH/6 km	DSQ								

== Short track speed skating ==
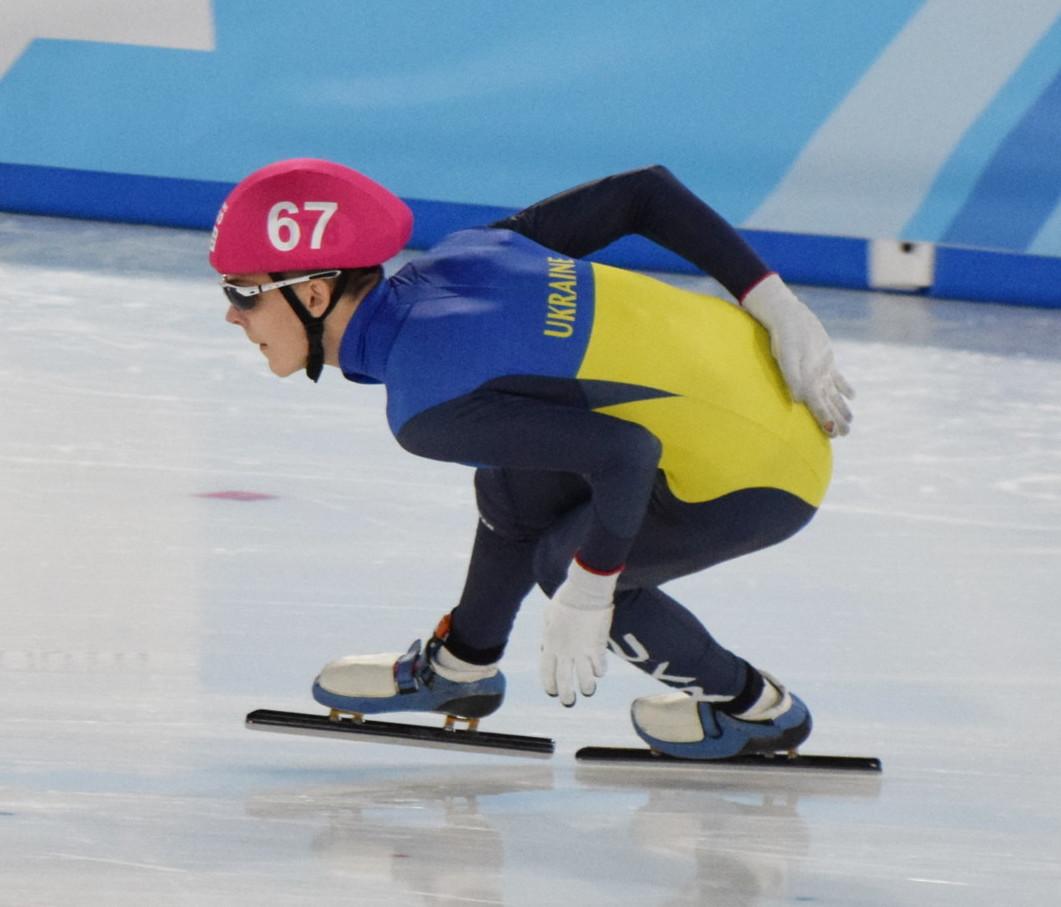
Danylo Fedorenko competing in heats in 1000 metres events.

Two Ukrainian skaters achieved quota places for Ukraine based on the results of the 2019 World Junior Short Track Speed Skating Championships.

Boys

Athlete	Event	Heats		Quarterfinal		Semifinal		Final	
Athlete	Event	Time	Rank	Time	Rank	Time	Rank	Time	Rank
Danylo Fedorenko	500 m	44.844	3	DNQ					
Danylo Fedorenko	1000 m	1:33.042	2	1:32.144	4	DNQ			

Girls

Athlete	Event	Heats		Quarterfinal		Semifinal		Final	
Athlete	Event	Time	Rank	Time	Rank	Time	Rank	Time	Rank
Tetiana Zarvanska	500 m	47.578	3	DNQ					
Tetiana Zarvanska	1000 m	1:45.982	3	DNQ					

== Skeleton ==
Girls

Athlete	Event	Final			
Athlete	Event	Run 1	Run 2	Total	Rank
Lansiia Dmytriieva	Girls'	1:13.23	1:13.89	2:27.12	15

== Ski jumping ==
Athlete	Event	Jump 1			Jump 2			Total	
Athlete	Event	Distance	Points	Rank	Distance	Points	Rank	Points	Rank
Anton Korchuk	Boys' NH	72.5	80.4	29	69.5	84.0	27	164.4	28
Yurii Yaniuk	Boys' NH	66.5	68.3	34	68.5	69.3	35	137.6	34
Vitalina Herasymiuk	Girls' NH	59.0	62.6	28	64.0	63.6	26	126.2	27
Tetiana Pylypchuk	Girls' NH	63.0	65.0	25	63.0	55.1	29	120.1	28

== Snowboarding ==
Snowboard cross

Athlete	Event	Group heats		Semifinal		Final	
Athlete	Event	Points	Rank	Deficit	Rank	Deficit	Rank
Ivan Malovannyi	Boys'	14	=6	DNQ			

Team ski-snowboard cross

Athletes	Event	Pre-heats	Heats	Semifinals	Finals
Mixed Team 1 Chloé Passerat (FRA); Lia Nilsson (SWE); Ivan Malovannyi (UKR); Kilian Himmelsbach (GER)	Team ski-snowboard cross	Bye	1 Q	4 QB	5

== See also ==
- Ukraine at the 2020 Summer Olympics
