= Cross-country skiing at the Winter Youth Olympics =

- Governing body: FIS
- Events: 5 (men: 2; womens: 2; mixed: 1)

Games
- 2012; 2016; 2020; 2024

Cross-country skiing was inducted at the Youth Olympic Games at the inaugural edition in 2012.

== Medal summaries ==
=== Boys' 10 kilometres ===
Games	Gold	Silver	Bronze
2012 Innsbruck	Alexander Selyaninov; Russia	Kentaro Ishikawa; Japan	Sergey Malyshev; Kazakhstan
2016 Lillehammer	Kim Magnus; South Korea	Vebjørn Hegdal; Norway	Igor Fedotov; Russia
2020 Lausanne	Iliya Tregubov; Russia	Elias Keck; Germany	Will Koch; United States

=== Boys' 7.5 kilometres ===
Games	Gold	Silver	Bronze
2024 Gangwon	Jakob Moch; Germany	Jonas Müller; Germany	Quentin Lespine; France

=== Boys' sprint ===
Games	Gold	Silver	Bronze
2012 Innsbruck	Andreas Molden; Norway	Marius Cebulla; Germany	Alexander Selyaninov; Russia
2016 Lillehammer	Thomas Helland Larsen; Norway	Kim Magnus; South Korea	Vebjørn Hegdal; Norway
2020 Lausanne	Edvin Anger; Sweden	Nikolai Holmboe; Norway	Aleksander Holmboe; Norway
2024 Gangwon	Federico Pozzi; Italy	Jakob Moch; Germany	Tabor Greenberg; United States

=== Boys' cross-country cross ===
Games	Gold	Silver	Bronze
2016 Lillehammer	Kim Magnus; South Korea	Thomas Helland Larsen; Norway	Lauri Mannila; Finland
2020 Lausanne	Nikolai Holmboe; Norway	Edvin Anger; Sweden	Albin Åström; Sweden

=== Girls' 5 kilometre ===
Games	Gold	Silver	Bronze
2012 Innsbruck	Anastasia Sedova; Russia	Anamarija Lampič; Slovenia	Lea Einfalt; Slovenia
2016 Lillehammer	Maya Yakunina; Russia	Chi Chunxue; China	Rebecca Immonen; Finland
2020 Lausanne	Märta Rosenberg; Sweden	Siri Wigger; Switzerland	Kendall Kramer; United States

=== Girls' 7.5 kilometre ===
Games	Gold	Silver	Bronze
2024 Gangwon	Nelli-Lotta Karppelin; Finland	Agathe Margreither; France	Annette Coupat; France

=== Girls' sprint ===
Games	Gold	Silver	Bronze
2012 Innsbruck	Silje Theodorsen; Norway	Jonna Sundling; Sweden	Linn Eriksen; Norway
2016 Lillehammer	Johanna Hagström; Sweden	Yuliya Petrova; Russia	Martine Engebretsen; Norway
2020 Lausanne	Siri Wigger; Switzerland	Anna Heggen; Norway	Märta Rosenberg; Sweden
2024 Gangwon	Elsa Tänglander; Sweden	Kajsa Johansson; Sweden	Nelli-Lotta Karppelin; Finland

=== Girls' cross-country cross ===
Games	Gold	Silver	Bronze
2016 Lillehammer	Moa Lundgren; Sweden	Johanna Hagström; Sweden	Laura Chamiot Maitral; France
2020 Lausanne	Siri Wigger; Switzerland	Märta Rosenberg; Sweden	Tove Ericsson; Sweden

=== Mixed relay ===
Games	Gold	Silver	Bronze
2024 Gangwon	Germany; Sarah Hoffmann; Jonas Müller; Lena Einsiedler; Jakob Moch	France; Agathe Margreither; Gaspard Cottaz; Annette Coupat; Quentin Lespine	Switzerland; Leandra Schöpfer; Nolan Gertsch; Ilaria Gruber; Maximilian Wanger

== Medal table ==
As of the 2020 Winter Youth Olympics.

Rank	Nation	Gold	Silver	Bronze	Total
1	Sweden	5	5	3	13
2	Norway	4	4	4	12
3	Russia	4	1	2	7
4	Germany	2	4	0	6
5	Switzerland	2	1	1	4
6	South Korea	2	1	0	3
7	Finland	1	0	3	4
8	Italy	1	0	0	1
9	France	0	2	3	5
10	Slovenia	0	1	1	2
11	China	0	1	0	1
11	Japan	0	1	0	1
13	United States	0	0	3	3
14	Kazakhstan	0	0	1	1
Totals (14 entries)		21	21	21	63

== See also ==
- Cross-country skiing at the Winter Olympics
