= Estonia at the 2020 Winter Youth Olympics =

- IOC code: EST
- NOC: Estonian Olympic Committee
- Website: www.eok.ee

in Lausanne
- Competitors: 25 in 9 sports
- Flag bearer (opening): Lisbeth Liiv
- Flag bearer (closing): Johanna Udras
- Medals Ranked 20th: Gold 1 Silver 0 Bronze 0 Total 1

Winter Youth Olympics appearances (overview)
- 2012; 2016; 2020; 2024

Estonia competed at the 2020 Winter Youth Olympics in Lausanne, Switzerland from 9 to 22 January 2020.

== Medalists ==
Medals awarded to participants of mixed-NOC teams are represented in italics. These medals are not counted towards the individual NOC medal tally.

Medal	Name	Sport	Event	Date
Gold	Arlet Levandi	Figure skating	Team trophy	15 January
Gold	Marek Potšinok	Ice hockey	Boys' 3x3 mixed tournament	15 January
Gold	Kelly Sildaru	Freestyle skiing	Girls' slopestyle	18 January
Bronze	Erik Potšinok	Ice hockey	Boys' 3x3 mixed tournament	15 January

== Competitors ==
The following is the list of number of competitors that participated at the Games per sport/discipline.

Sport	Boys	Girls	Total
Alpine skiing	1	0	2
Biathlon	3	3	6
Cross-country	2	2	4
Curling	2	2	4
Figure skating	1	1	2
Freestyle skiing	0	1	1
Ice hockey	3	0	3
Nordic combined	2	1	3
Ski jumping	2	1	3
Total	15	10	25

* Markkus Alter and Triinu Hausenberg competed in Nordic combined and ski jumping.

== Alpine skiing ==
Boys

Athlete	Event	Run 1		Run 2		Total	
Athlete	Event	Time	Rank	Time	Rank	Time	Rank
Hans Markus Danilas	Giant slalom	1:12.74	45	1:11.51	39	2:24.25	40
Hans Markus Danilas	Slalom	42.84	39	44.59	28	1:27.43	29

== Biathlon ==
Boys

Athlete	Event	Time	Misses	Rank
Markus Rene Epner	Sprint	DNS		
Markus Rene Epner	Individual	38:58.3	8 (3+1+2+2)	37
Andreas Koppa	Sprint	22:51.1	5 (1+4)	56
Andreas Koppa	Individual	42:34.6	10 (4+2+1+3)	75
Tuudor Palm	Sprint	22:08.8	5 (3+2)	41
Tuudor Palm	Individual	39:25.6	7 (2+1+1+3)	42

Girls

Athlete	Event	Time	Misses	Rank
Demi Heinsoo	Sprint	21:38.1	4 (1+3)	56
Demi Heinsoo	Individual	35:46.7	4 (1+1+0+2)	15
Lisbeth Liiv	Sprint	21:04.9	4 (2+2)	47
Lisbeth Liiv	Individual	40:44.3	11 (3+1+4+3)	62
Miia Heleene Utsal	Sprint	23:03.4	3 (1+2)	73
Miia Heleene Utsal	Individual	40:28.3	5 (1+2+0+2)	59

Mixed

Athletes	Event	Time	Misses	Rank
Demi Heinsoo; Markus Rene Epner	Single mixed relay	45:07.7	4+18	14
Demi Heinsoo; Lisbeth Liiv; Tuudor Palm; Andreas Koppa	Mixed relay	1:19:25.2	6+23	16

== Cross-country skiing ==
Boys

Athlete	Event	Qualification		Quarterfinal		Semifinal		Final	
Athlete	Event	Time	Rank	Time	Rank	Time	Rank	Time	Rank
Kaspar Päärson	10 km classic	—N/a						29:00.4	28
Kaspar Päärson	Freestyle sprint	3:21.24	13	3:57.83	6	Did not advance			
Kaspar Päärson	Cross-country cross	4:35.93	29	—N/a		4:33.14	9	Did not advance	
Anders Veerpalu	10 km classic	—N/a						29:23.6	33
Anders Veerpalu	Freestyle sprint	3:35.21	49	Did not advance					
Anders Veerpalu	Cross-country cross	4:35.29	25	—N/a		4:33.63	10	Did not advance	

Girls

Athlete	Event	Qualification		Quarterfinal		Semifinal		Final	
Athlete	Event	Time	Rank	Time	Rank	Time	Rank	Time	Rank
Johanna Udras	5 km classical	—N/a						15:23.3	16
Johanna Udras	Freestyle sprint	2:46.92	3	2:55.14	1	2:48.67	3	2:58.44	5
Johanna Udras	Cross-country cross	5:15.81	18	—N/a		5:18.64	7	Did not advance	
Eliisabet Kool	5 km classical	—N/a						16:35.1	42
Eliisabet Kool	Freestyle sprint	3:13.31	58	Did not advance					
Eliisabet Kool	Cross-country cross	5:45.91	49	—N/a		Did not advance			

== Curling ==
Estonia qualified a mixed team of four athletes.

Mixed team

Team	Event	Group Stage						Quarterfinal	Semifinal	Final / BM	
Team	Event	Opposition Score	Opposition Score	Opposition Score	Opposition Score	Opposition Score	Rank	Opposition Score	Opposition Score	Opposition Score	Rank
Henry Grünberg; Natali Vedro; Romet Mäesalu; Katariina Klammer	Mixed team	South Korea; L 3 – 15	Spain; L 3 – 9	Poland; L 3 – 9	Russia; L 4 – 8	Canada; L 2 – 10	6	Did not advance			21

Mixed doubles

Athletes	Event	Round of 48	Round of 24	Round of 12	Round of 6	Semifinals	Final / BM	
Athletes	Event	Opposition Result	Opposition Result	Opposition Result	Opposition Result	Opposition Result	Opposition Result	Rank
Katariina Klammer (EST); Mikhail Vlasenko (RUS)	Mixed doubles	Schwaller (SUI); Tatár (HUN); W 6–4	Bitmete (LAT); Maeda (JPN); L 7–8	Did not advance				
Natali Vedro (EST); Lukas Høstmælingen (NOR)	Mixed doubles	L 6–8	Did not advance					
Lucy Neilson (NZL); Henry Grünberg (EST)	Mixed doubles	Şengül (TUR) / Moberg (SWE); L 3–7	Did not advance					
Momoha Tabata (JPN); Romet Mäesalu (EST)	Mixed doubles	L 6–8	Did not advance					

== Figure skating ==
Two Estonian figure skaters achieved quota places for Estonia based on their results in the ISU Junior Grand Prix.

Singles

Athlete	Event	SP		FS		Total	
Athlete	Event	Points	Rank	Points	Rank	Points	Rank
Arlet Levandi	Boys' singles	49.87	13	104.78	11	154.65	12
Eva-Lotta Kiibus	Girls' singles	46.63	14	92.07	12	138.70	14

Mixed NOC team trophy

Athletes	Event	Free skate / Free dance					
Athletes	Event	Ice dance	Pairs	Girls	Boys	Total	
Athletes	Event	Points Team points	Points Team points	Points Team points	Points Team points	Points	Rank
Team Courage; Utana Yoshida / Shingo Nishiyama (JPN); Alina Butaeva / Luka Berulava (GEO); Ksenia Sinitsyna (RUS); Arlet Levandi (EST)	Team trophy	99.21; 8	100.70; 6	127.63; 8	97.63; 2	24	1st place, gold medalist(s)

== Freestyle skiing ==
Girls

Athlete	Event	Qualification				Final				
Athlete	Event	Run 1	Run 2	Best	Rank	Run 1	Run 2	Run 3	Best	Rank
Kelly Sildaru	Girls' slopestyle	91.25	95.50	95.50	1	91.5	93.75	71.50	93.75	1st place, gold medalist(s)

== Ice hockey ==
=== 3x3 ===
Team	Event	Group Stage								Semifinal	Final / BM	
Team	Event	Opposition Score	Opposition Score	Opposition Score	Opposition Score	Opposition Score	Opposition Score	Opposition Score	Rank	Opposition Score	Opposition Score	Rank
Team Blue; Caleb Chapman (NZL); Chen Chih-yuan (TPE); Jakub Trzebunia (POL); Ziya Efe Güçlü (TUR); Hong Seung-woo (KOR); Daniel Assavolyuk (GER); Joris Valčiukas (LTU); Riley Langille (AUS); Cater Hamill (GBR); Konrad Kudeviita (EST); Simone Terraneo (SUI); Oliver Thestrup Hansen (DEN); Issa Otsuka (JPN)	Boys' 3x3	Team Grey (MIX); L 8–9 (1–2, 3–5, 4–2)	Team Orange (MIX); L 1–12 (1–5, 0–2, 0–5)	Team Black (MIX); L 8–14 (4–7, 2–5, 2–2)	Team Green (MIX); L 6–11 (1–2, 3–2, 2–7)	Team Yellow (MIX); L 8–13 (2–3, 2–4, 4–6)	Team Brown (MIX); L 2–14 (0–5, 1–3, 1–6)	Team Red (MIX); L 11–18 (2–11, 3–3, 6–4)	8	Did not advance		
Team Brown; Axel Ruski-Jones (NZL); Luka Banek (CRO); Sai Lake (AUS); Hugo Galvez (FRA); Elvis Hsu (HKG); Marlon D'Acunto (GER); Erik Potšinok (EST); Evan Nauth (GBR); Artur Seniut (LTU); Matyáš Šapovaliv (CZE); Milán Ivády (HUN); Rastislav Eliáš (SVK); Sebastian Aarsund (NOR)	Boys' 3x3	Team Black (MIX); W 13–11 (6–5, 3–2, 4–4)	Team Green (MIX); L 6–8 (1–2, 3–2, 2–4)	Team Grey (MIX); W 16–6 (4–3, 4–2, 8–1)	Team Orange (MIX); W 14–10 (6–0, 5–4, 3–6)	Team Red (MIX); L 5–11 (2–3, 1–4, 2–4)	Team Blue (MIX); W 14–2 (5–0, 3–1, 6–1)	Team Yellow (MIX); W 8–6 (2–1, 2–0, 4–5)	2	Team Red (MIX); L 7–9 (4–4, 2–3, 1–2)	Team Black (MIX); W 6–5 (1–2, 3–1, 2–2)	3rd place, bronze medalist(s)
Team Green; Nicolas Elgas (LUX); Artyom Pronichkin (RUS); Nathan Nicoud (FRA); Volodymyr Troshkin (UKR); Pablo González (ESP); Maks Perčič (SLO); Yam Yau (HKG); Alessandro Segafredo (ITA); Ilya Korzun (BLR); Marek Potšinok (EST); Patrik Dalen (NOR); Levente Hegedűs (HUN); Štěpán Maleček (CZE)	Boys' 3x3	Team Yellow (MIX); W 10–5 (2–0, 1–2, 7–3)	Team Brown (MIX); W 8–6 (2–1, 2–3, 4–2)	Team Red (MIX); W 9–8 GWS (2–4, 3–2, 3–2) (SO: 1–0)	Team Blue (MIX); W 11–6 (2–1, 2–3, 7–2)	Team Grey (MIX); W 14–6 (3–2, 4–1, 7–3)	Team Orange (MIX); W 8–6 (1–1, 1–1, 6–4)	Team Black (MIX); L 4–6 (2–2, 1–2, 1–2)	1	Team Black (MIX); W 7–3 (0–2, 2–0, 5–1)	Team Red (MIX); W 10–4 (3–2, 4–1, 3–1)	1st place, gold medalist(s)

== Nordic combined ==
Boys

Athlete	Event	Ski jumping				Cross-country	
Athlete	Event	Distance	Points	Rank	Deficit	Time	Rank
Markkus Alter	Normal hill/6 km	82.5	109.0	11	0:46	15:54.1	15
Markus Kägu	Normal hill/6 km	81.0	101.6	17	1:16	16:47.1	23

Girls

Athlete	Event	Ski jumping				Cross-country	
Athlete	Event	Distance	Points	Rank	Deficit	Time	Rank
Triinu Hausenberg	Normal hill/4 km	65.0	74.7	20	2:36	12:32.5	20

== Ski jumping ==
Boys

Athlete	Event	First round			Final			Total	
Athlete	Event	Distance	Points	Rank	Distance	Points	Rank	Points	Rank
Markkus Alter	Boys' normal hill	80.5	92.5	24	76.5	96.0	22	188.5	24
Karel Rammo	Boys' normal hill	68.5	69.5	33	68.5	78.5	30	148.0	33

Girls

Athlete	Event	First round			Final			Total	
Athlete	Event	Distance	Points	Rank	Distance	Points	Rank	Points	Rank
Triinu Hausenberg	Girls' normal hill	Did not start							

== See also ==
- Estonia at the 2020 Summer Olympics
