= Cross-country skiing at the 2020 Winter Youth Olympics =

Cross-country skiing at the III Winter Youth Olympic Games
- Venue: Vallée de Joux; Jura, Switzerland
- Dates: 18–21 January
- Competitors: 170 from 49 nations

Cross-country skiing at the 2020 Winter Youth Olympics took place at Vallée de Joux in Jura, Switzerland.

== Medal table ==
* Host nation (Switzerland)

Rank	Nation	Gold	Silver	Bronze	Total
1	Sweden	2	2	3	7
2	Switzerland*	2	1	0	3
3	Norway	1	2	1	4
4	Russia	1	0	0	1
5	Germany	0	1	0	1
6	United States	0	0	2	2
Totals (6 entries)		6	6	6	18

== Events ==
=== Boys' events ===
Event	Gold		Silver		Bronze	
10 km classical	Iliya Tregubov; Russia	26:40.5	Elias Keck; Germany	27:25.5	Will Koch; United States	27:29.5
Sprint freestyle	Edvin Anger; Sweden	3:10.4	Nikolai Holmboe; Norway	3:10.97	Aleksander Holmboe; Norway	3:15.51
Cross-country cross freestyle	Nikolai Holmboe; Norway	4:09.97	Edvin Anger; Sweden	4:11.74	Albin Åström; Sweden	4:13.51

=== Girls' events ===
Event	Gold		Silver		Bronze	
5 km classical	Märta Rosenberg; Sweden	14:15.7	Siri Wigger; Switzerland	14:28.4	Kendall Kramer; United States	14:36.3
Sprint freestyle	Siri Wigger; Switzerland	2:46.40	Anna Heggen; Norway	2:47.87	Märta Rosenberg; Sweden	2:48.92
Cross-country cross freestyle	Siri Wigger; Switzerland	4:39.95	Märta Rosenberg; Sweden	4:40.72	Tove Ericsson; Sweden	4:41.10

== Qualification ==
=== Summary ===
NOC	Boys'	Girls'	Total
Argentina	2	2	4
Armenia	1		1
Australia	2	2	4
Austria	3	3	6
Belarus	2	1	3
Bosnia and Herzegovina	1	2	3
Brazil	2	2	4
Bulgaria	1		1
Canada	2	2	4
Chile	1	1	2
China	2	2	4
Croatia	1	2	3
Czech Republic	3	3	6
Denmark	1		1
Estonia	2	2	4
Finland	3	3	6
France	3	3	6
Germany	3	3	6
Great Britain	1	1	2
Greece	2	2	4
Hungary		1	1
Iceland	1	1	2
Iran	1	1	2
Italy	3	3	6
Japan		1	1
Kazakhstan	2	2	4
Kyrgyzstan	1	1	2
Latvia	2	2	4
Lebanon	1		1
Liechtenstein	1		1
Lithuania	2	1	3
Mongolia	2	2	4
Montenegro	1		1
New Zealand	1		1
North Macedonia	1	1	2
Norway	3	3	6
Poland	3	3	6
Romania	2	2	4
Russia	3	3	6
Slovakia	2	2	4
Slovenia	2	2	4
South Korea	2	2	4
Spain	1	1	2
Sweden	2	2	4
Switzerland	3	3	6
Thailand	1	1	2
Turkey	1	2	3
Ukraine	2	2	4
United States	3	3	6
Total: 49 NOCs	87	83	170
