= Cross-country skiing at the 2020 Winter Youth Olympics – Girls' 5 kilometre classical =

Girls' 5 kilometre classical at the III Winter Youth Olympic Games
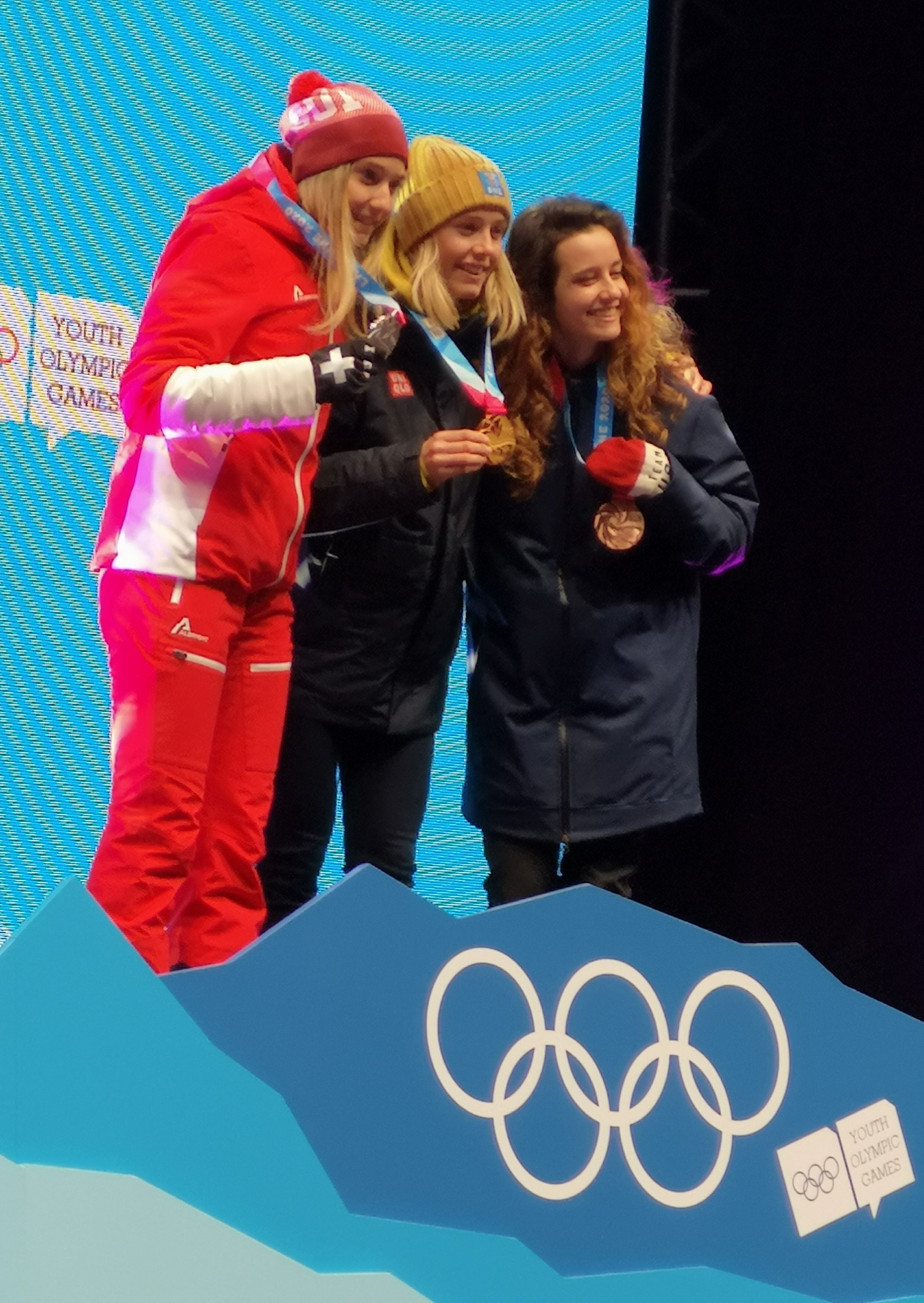
- Venue: Vallée de Joux Cross-Country Centre
- Date: 21 January
- Competitors: 79 from 40 nations

Medalists
1st place, gold medalist(s)		Märta Rosenberg	Sweden
2nd place, silver medalist(s)		Siri Wigger	Switzerland
3rd place, bronze medalist(s)		Kendall Kramer	United States

The girls' 5 kilometre classical cross-country skiing competition at the 2020 Winter Youth Olympics was held on 21 January at the Vallée de Joux Cross-Country Centre.

== Results ==
The race was started at 11:00.

Rank	Bib	Athlete	Country	Time	Deficit
1st place, gold medalist(s)	77	Märta Rosenberg	Sweden	14:15.7	
2nd place, silver medalist(s)	83	Siri Wigger	Switzerland	14:28.4	+12.7
3rd place, bronze medalist(s)	79	Kendall Kramer	United States	14:36.3	+20.6
4	81	Sydney Palmer-Leger	United States	14:43.3	+27.6
5	68	Maria Melling	Norway	14:50.3	+34.6
6	73	Germana Thannheimer	Germany	14:52.9	+37.2
7	64	Tuva Hagen Rønning	Norway	14:53.0	+37.3
8	82	Tove Ericsson	Sweden	14:53.6	+37.9
9	71	Anna Heggen	Norway	14:58.5	+42.8
10	80	Helen Hoffmann	Germany	14:59.5	+43.8
11	67	Dariya Nepryaeva	Russia	15:05.5	+49.8
12	54	Bianca Buholzer	Switzerland	15:07.0	+51.3
13	75	Julie Pierrel	France	15:11.6	+55.9
14	51	Marina Kälin	Switzerland	15:13.9	+58.2
15	78	Evgeniya Krupitskaya	Russia	15:21.6	+1:05.9
16	56	Johanna Udras	Estonia	15:23.3	+1:07.6
17	66	Jasmine Drolet	Canada	15:30.0	+1:14.3
18	47	Hanna Popko	Poland	15:33.0	+1:17.3
19	72	Chika Honda	Japan	15:34.3	+1:18.6
20	76	Karolina Kaleta	Poland	15:36.1	+1:20.4
21	61	Karolina Kukuczka	Poland	15:41.6	+1:25.9
22	69	Lara Dellit	Germany	15:44.8	+1:29.1
23	59	Kristína Sivoková	Slovakia	15:45.7	+1:30.0
24	50	Eliška Šibravová	Czech Republic	15:48.4	+1:32.7
25	70	Aisha Rakisheva	Kazakhstan	15:51.2	+1:35.5
26	55	Eevi-Inkeri Tossavainen	Finland	15:51.6	+1:35.9
27	49	Liliane Gagnon	Canada	15:52.5	+1:36.8
28	58	Hana Mazi Jamnik	Slovenia	15:52.6	+1:36.9
29	74	Witta-Luisa Walcher	Austria	15:53.8	+1:38.1
30	43	Ilyuza Gusmanova	Russia	15:55.0	+1:39.3
31	63	Maëlle Veyre	France	15:59.2	+1:43.5
32	45	Magdalena Engelhardt	Austria	16:15.3	+1:59.6
33	27	Zoé Favre-Bonvin	France	16:16.7	+2:01.0
34	32	Silvia Campione	Italy	16:18.6	+2:02.9
35	60	Nina Seemann	United States	16:21.1	+2:05.4
36	39	Rosie Fordham	Australia	16:24.1	+2:08.4
37	33	Zana Evans	Australia	16:26.3	+2:10.6
38	31	Tereza Prokešová	Czech Republic	16:27.0	+2:11.3
39	42	Hanna Machakhina	Belarus	16:27.2	+2:11.5
39	48	Tuuli Raunio	Finland	16:27.2	+2:11.5
41	44	Francesca Cola	Italy	16:29.2	+2:13.5
42	24	Eliisabet Kool	Estonia	16:35.1	+2:19.4
43	53	Iris De Martin Pinter	Italy	16:45.5	+2:29.8
44	37	Kateřina Svobodová	Czech Republic	16:45.9	+2:30.2
45	16	Yang Lianhong	China	16:48.9	+2:33.2
46	65	Sonja Leinamo	Finland	16:49.1	+2:33.4
47	22	Anna Maria Logonder	Austria	16:49.7	+2:34.0
48	18	Dong Zhaohui	China	16:50.2	+2:34.5
49	40	Anastasiia Nikon	Ukraine	16:58.2	+2:42.5
50	19	Timea Mazúrová	Slovakia	17:00.3	+2:44.6
51	35	Anastasiia Kompaniiets	Ukraine	17:10.2	+2:54.5
52	62	Nika Jagečić	Croatia	17:12.3	+2:56.6
53	11	Kristīne Brunere	Latvia	17:26.9	+3:11.2
54	57	Agustina Groetzner	Argentina	17:33.5	+3:17.8
55	36	Marta Moreno	Spain	17:36.9	+3:21.2
56	34	Özlem Ceren Dursun	Turkey	17:42.8	+3:27.1
57	21	Valeriya Batchenko	Kazakhstan	17:57.2	+3:41.5
58	41	Darya Mayorava	Belarus	17:59.8	+3:44.1
59	17	Molly Jefferies	Great Britain	18:00.1	+3:44.4
60	26	Jeon Jae-eun	South Korea	18:07.6	+3:51.9
61	15	Barsnyamyn Nomin-Erdene	Mongolia	18:08.7	+3:53.0
62	23	Maria Jeong	South Korea	18:11.0	+3:55.3
63	30	Tena Hadžić	Croatia	18:12.4	+3:56.7
64	20	Fatma Yavuz	Turkey	18:12.9	+3:57.2
65	6	Eglė Savickaitė	Lithuania	18:18.3	+4:02.6
66	12	Samanta Krampe	Latvia	19:11.1	+4:55.4
67	46	Zoe Ojeda	Argentina	19:13.6	+4:57.9
68	1	Linda Rós Hannesdóttir	Iceland	20:13.6	+5:57.9
69	28	Sara Plakalović	Bosnia and Herzegovina	20:45.4	+6:29.7
70	5	Eszter Kocsik	Hungary	21:11.5	+6:55.8
71	8	Natalia Ayala	Chile	21:27.0	+7:11.3
72	9	Adelina Rîmbeu	Romania	21:27.6	+7:11.9
73	4	Duangkamon Hitchana	Thailand	21:52.1	+7:36.4
74	14	Taynara da Silva	Brazil	22:57.7	+8:42.0
75	3	Vesna Pantić	Bosnia and Herzegovina	24:02.5	+9:46.8
76	2	Elena Bondarets	Kyrgyzstan	24:40.4	+10:24.7
77	7	Farnoosh Shemshaki	Iran	25:39.6	+11:23.9
	13	Dulamsürengiin Urangoo	Mongolia	Did not finish	
	38	Klara Mali	Slovenia	Did not finish	
	10	Dorina Puşcariu	Romania	Did not start	
	25	Eleni Ioannou	Greece	Did not start	
	29	Eduarda Ribera	Brazil	Did not start	
	52	Styliani Giannakoviti	Greece	Did not start	
