= Cross-country skiing at the 2020 Winter Youth Olympics – Girls' cross-country cross =

Girls' cross-country cross at the III Winter Youth Olympic Games
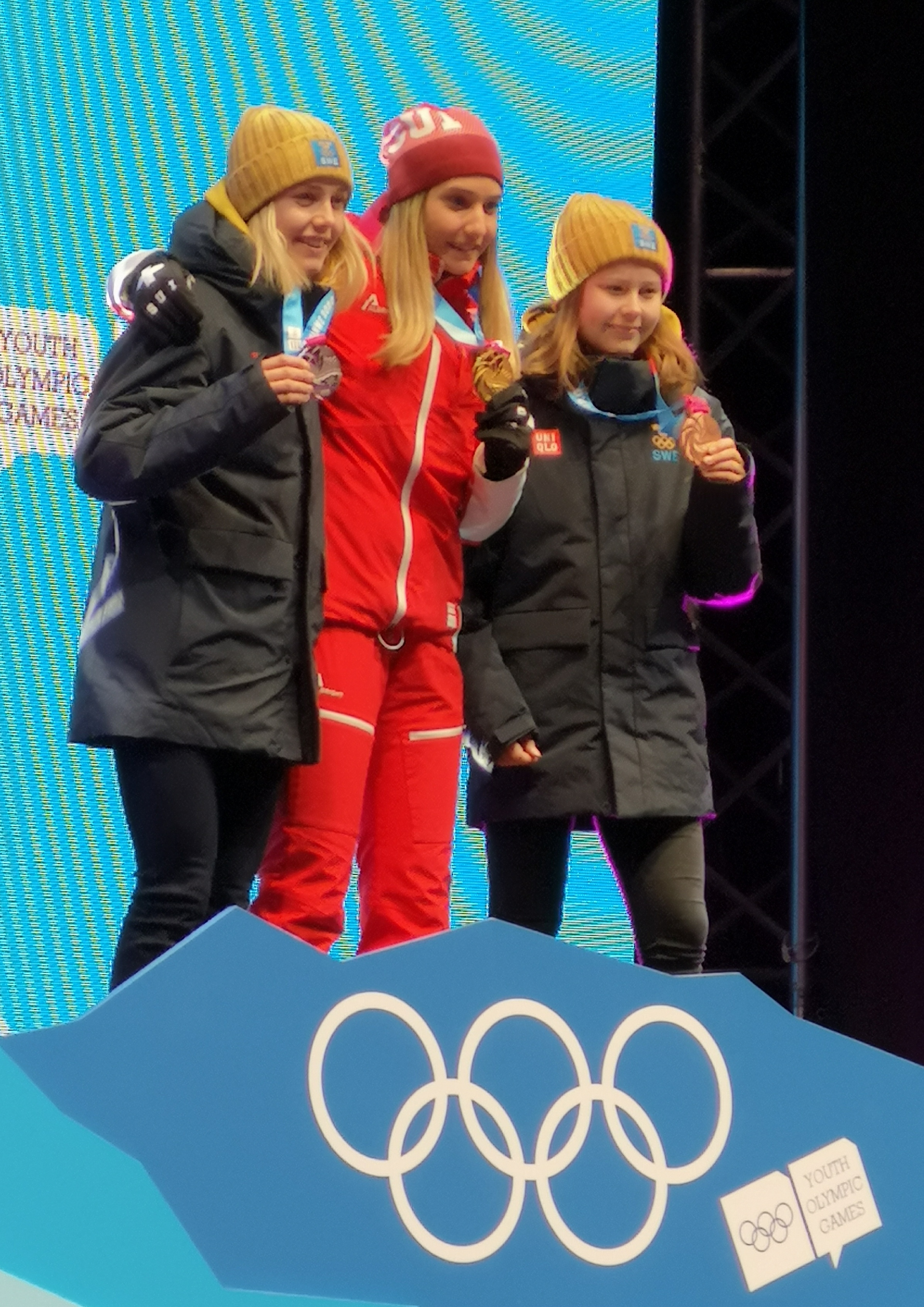
- Venue: Vallée de Joux Cross-Country Centre
- Date: 18 January
- Competitors: 80 from 39 nations

Medalists
1st place, gold medalist(s)		Siri Wigger	Switzerland
2nd place, silver medalist(s)		Märta Rosenberg	Sweden
3rd place, bronze medalist(s)		Tove Ericsson	Sweden

The girls' cross-country cross freestyle cross-country skiing competition at the 2020 Winter Youth Olympics was held on 18 January at the Vallée de Joux Cross-Country Centre.

== Results ==
=== Qualifying ===
The qualifying was held at 11:00.

Rank	Bib	Athlete	Country	Time	Deficit	Note
1	1	Siri Wigger	Switzerland	4:43.91		Q
2	7	Märta Rosenberg	Sweden	4:46.59	+2.68	Q
3	5	Tove Ericsson	Sweden	4:54.02	+10.11	Q
4	33	Anna Heggen	Norway	4:55.21	+11.30	Q
5	20	Maria Melling	Norway	4:56.72	+12.81	Q
6	27	Helen Hoffmann	Germany	4:58.42	+14.51	Q
7	22	Evgeniya Krupitskaya	Russia	5:00.96	+17.05	Q
8	3	Sydney Palmer-Leger	United States	5:01.58	+17.67	Q
9	23	Witta-Luisa Walcher	Austria	5:04.70	+20.79	Q
10	18	Germana Thannheimer	Germany	5:05.45	+21.54	Q
11	4	Maëlle Veyre	France	5:07.44	+23.53	Q
12	10	Eevi-Inkeri Tossavainen	Finland	5:08.07	+24.16	Q
13	14	Karolina Kaleta	Poland	5:08.52	+24.61	Q
14	15	Kendall Kramer	United States	5:09.65	+25.74	Q
15	17	Lara Dellit	Germany	5:09.90	+25.99	Q
16	37	Nina Seemann	United States	5:10.26	+26.35	Q
17	53	Tuva Hagen Rønning	Norway	5:12.70	+28.79	Q
18	21	Johanna Udras	Estonia	5:15.81	+31.90	Q
19	79	Ilyuza Gusmanova	Russia	5:20.19	+36.28	Q
20	31	Marina Kälin	Switzerland	5:21.27	+37.36	Q
21	13	Aisha Rakisheva	Kazakhstan	5:21.54	+37.63	Q
22	24	Liliane Gagnon	Canada	5:22.05	+38.14	Q
23	78	Iris De Martin Pinter	Italy	5:22.82	+38.91	Q
24	47	Hanna Popko	Poland	5:23.93	+40.02	Q
25	16	Bianca Buholzer	Switzerland	5:24.36	+40.45	Q
26	12	Kristína Sivoková	Slovakia	5:25.71	+41.80	Q
27	11	Klara Mali	Slovenia	5:26.24	+42.33	Q
28	48	Magdalena Engelhardt	Austria	5:26.51	+42.60	Q
29	29	Francesca Cola	Italy	5:26.63	+42.72	Q
30	2	Tuuli Raunio	Finland	5:26.68	+42.77	Q
31	34	Eliška Šibravová	Czech Republic	5:26.88	+42.97	
32	6	Dariya Nepryaeva	Russia	5:26.95	+43.04	
33	51	Chika Honda	Japan	5:27.62	+43.71	
34	25	Jasmine Drolet	Canada	5:27.71	+43.80	
35	28	Karolina Kukuczka	Poland	5:28.44	+44.53	
36	41	Tereza Prokešová	Czech Republic	5:30.73	+46.82	
37	9	Sonja Leinamo	Finland	5:32.06	+48.15	
38	8	Julie Pierrel	France	5:32.68	+48.77	
39	36	Yang Lianhong	China	5:32.83	+48.92	
40	80	Hanna Machakhina	Belarus	5:32.88	+48.97	
41	38	Zana Evans	Australia	5:36.38	+52.47	
42	26	Anna Maria Logonder	Austria	5:37.40	+53.49	
43	54	Zoé Favre-Bonvin	France	5:37.96	+54.05	
44	42	Nika Jagečić	Croatia	5:38.53	+54.62	
45	60	Silvia Campione	Italy	5:38.77	+54.86	
46	19	Agustina Groetzner	Argentina	5:39.95	+56.04	
47	46	Kateřina Svobodová	Czech Republic	5:43.31	+59.40	
48	57	Rosie Fordham	Australia	5:44.41	+1:00.50	
49	62	Eliisabet Kool	Estonia	5:45.91	+1:02.00	
50	56	Marta Moreno	Spain	5:48.27	+1:04.36	
51	72	Molly Jefferies	Great Britain	5:48.28	+1:04.37	
52	44	Timea Mazúrová	Slovakia	5:48.90	+1:04.99	
53	39	Hana Mazi Jamnik	Slovenia	5:52.70	+1:08.79	
54	32	Anastasiia Kompaniiets	Ukraine	5:55.11	+1:11.20	
55	59	Dong Zhaohui	China	5:56.93	+1:13.02	
56	49	Samanta Krampe	Latvia	5:57.92	+1:14.01	
57	67	Barsnyamyn Nomin-Erdene	Mongolia	5:59.79	+1:14.88	
58	55	Tena Hadžić	Croatia	5:59.02	+1:15.11	
59	30	Zoe Ojeda	Argentina	6:02.20	+1:18.29	
60	58	Sara Plakalović	Bosnia and Herzegovina	6:02.45	+1:18.54	
61	35	Anastasiia Nikon	Ukraine	6:02.64	+1:18.73	
62	40	Valeriya Batchenko	Kazakhstan	6:07.06	+1:23.15	
63	63	Adelina Rîmbeu	Romania	6:10.19	+1:26.28	
64	45	Styliani Giannakoviti	Greece	6:15.42	+1:31.51	
65	61	Dorina Puşcariu	Romania	6:20.04	+1:36.13	
66	68	Maria Jeong	South Korea	6:22.69	+1:38.78	
67	75	Jeon Jae-eun	South Korea	6:25.46	+1:41.55	
68	70	Eglė Savickaitė	Lithuania	6:26.21	+1:42.30	
69	65	Dulamsürengiin Urangoo	Mongolia	6:26.51	+1:42.60	
70	64	Eleni Ioannou	Greece	6:29.62	+1:45.71	
71	43	Darya Mayorava	Belarus	6:32.09	+1:48.18	
72	69	Kristīne Brunere	Latvia	6:33.61	+1:49.70	
73	50	Eduarda Ribera	Brazil	6:56.14	+2:12.23	
74	66	Mihaela Danoska	North Macedonia	6:59.52	+2:15.61	
75	73	Eszter Kocsik	Hungary	7:08.99	+2:25.08	
76	76	Duangkamon Hitchana	Thailand	7:14.66	+2:30.75	
77	52	Taynara da Silva	Brazil	7:17.58	+2:33.67	
78	74	Farnoosh Shemshaki	Iran	7:45.68	+3:01.77	
79	77	Vesna Pantić	Bosnia and Herzegovina	7:51.94	+3:08.03	
80	71	Natalia Ayala	Chile	8:17.89	+3:33.98	

=== Semifinals ===
Semifinal 1

Rank	Seed	Athlete	Country	Time	Deficit	Note
1	1	Siri Wigger	Switzerland	4:53.69		Q
2	7	Evgeniya Krupitskaya	Russia	4:54.51	+0.82	Q
3	6	Helen Hoffmann	Germany	4:55.26	+1.57	LL
4	12	Eevi-Inkeri Tossavainen	Finland	5:09.16	+15.47	
5	25	Bianca Buholzer	Switzerland	5:15.65	+21.96	
6	24	Hanna Popko	Poland	5:16.63	+22.94	
7	18	Johanna Udras	Estonia	5:18.64	+24.95	
8	30	Tuuli Raunio	Finland	5:21.60	+27.91	
9	13	Karolina Kaleta	Poland	5:22.45	+28.76	
10	19	Ilyuza Gusmanova	Russia	5:33.21	+39.52	

Semifinal 2

Rank	Seed	Athlete	Country	Time	Deficit	Note
1	2	Märta Rosenberg	Sweden	4:46.50		Q
2	8	Sydney Palmer-Leger	United States	4:52.62	+6.12	Q
3	5	Maria Melling	Norway	4:53.37	+6.87	LL
4	20	Marina Kälin	Switzerland	5:05.23	+18.73	
5	17	Tuva Hagen Rønning	Norway	5:08.31	+21.81	
6	14	Kendall Kramer	United States	5:08.51	+22.01	
7	23	Iris De Martin Pinter	Italy	5:09.00	+22.50	
8	11	Maëlle Veyre	France	5:17.94	+31.44	
9	29	Francesca Cola	Italy	5:18.59	+32.09	
10	26	Kristína Sivoková	Slovakia	5:25.35	+38.85	

Semifinal 3

Rank	Seed	Athlete	Country	Time	Deficit	Note
1	3	Tove Ericsson	Sweden	4:52.89		Q
2	4	Anna Heggen	Norway	4:56.85	+3.96	Q
3	10	Germana Thannheimer	Germany	4:57.95	+5.06	LL
4	15	Lara Dellit	Germany	5:01.79	+8.90	LL
5	9	Witta-Luisa Walcher	Austria	5:01.82	+8.93	
6	16	Nina Seemann	United States	5:06.07	+13.18	
7	27	Klara Mali	Slovenia	5:16.28	+23.39	
8	21	Aisha Rakisheva	Kazakhstan	5:16.82	+23.93	
9	28	Magdalena Engelhardt	Austria	5:18.46	+25.57	
10	22	Liliane Gagnon	Canada	5:22.56	+29.67	

=== Final ===
The final was held at 13:42.

Rank	Seed	Athlete	Country	Time	Deficit	Note
1st place, gold medalist(s)	1	Siri Wigger	Switzerland	4:39.95		
2nd place, silver medalist(s)	2	Märta Rosenberg	Sweden	4:40.72	+0.77	
3rd place, bronze medalist(s)	3	Tove Ericsson	Sweden	4:41.10	+1.15	
4	8	Sydney Palmer-Leger	United States	4:49.31	+9.36	
5	4	Anna Heggen	Norway	4:50.86	+10.91	
6	7	Evgeniya Krupitskaya	Russia	4:51.58	+11.63	
7	5	Maria Melling	Norway	4:54.52	+14.57	
8	6	Helen Hoffmann	Germany	4:56.64	+16.69	
9	15	Lara Dellit	Germany	5:03.32	+23.37	
10	10	Germana Thannheimer	Germany	5:19.42	+39.47	
