= Siri Wigger =

Swiss cross-country skier (born 2003)

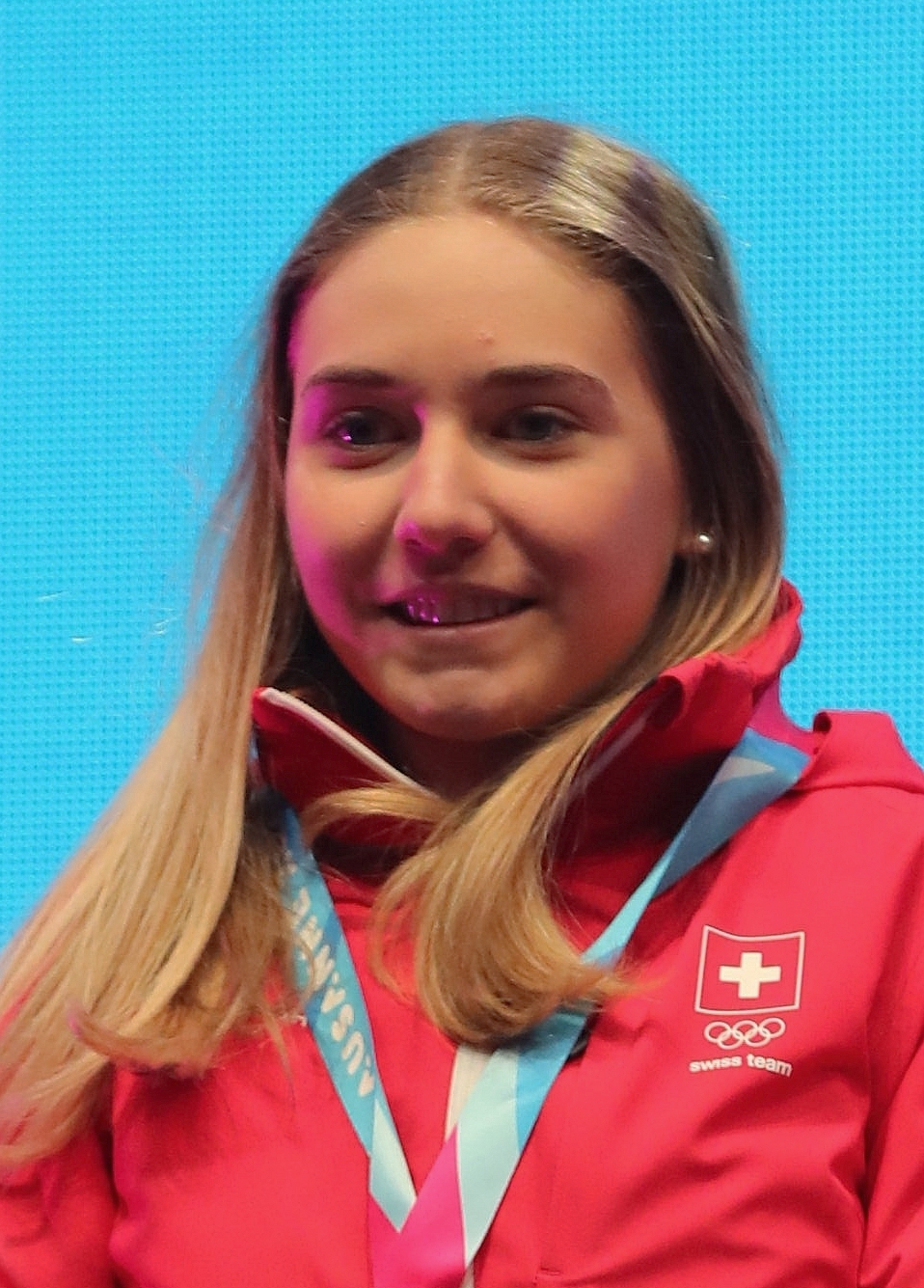
- Wigger in Lausanne, January, 2020

Personal information
- Born: 9 April 2003 (age 23)

Sport
- Sport: Cross-country skiing
- Club: Skiclub am Bachtel
Medal record
Women's cross-country skiing
Representing Switzerland
Junior World Championships
Gold medal – first place	2020 Oberwiesenthal	4 × 3.33 km relay
Bronze medal – third place	2020 Oberwiesenthal	Individual sprint
Bronze medal – third place	2020 Oberwiesenthal	15 km freestyle
Youth Winter Olympics
Gold medal – first place	2020 Lausanne	Cross
Gold medal – first place	2020 Lausanne	Sprint
Silver medal – second place	2020 Lausanne	Distance

Siri Wigger (born 9 April 2003) is a Swiss cross-country skier. She is two-time Youth Olympic champion (2020).

Wigger won Youth Olympic gold in Lausanne on 18 January 2020. Her result in the girls' cross final was 4:39.95, 0.77 better than Märta Rosenberg from Sweden who finished second.

She is the daughter of cross-country skier Jeremias Wigger.
