= Cross-country skiing at the 2020 Winter Youth Olympics – Girls' sprint =

Girls' sprint at the III Winter Youth Olympic Games
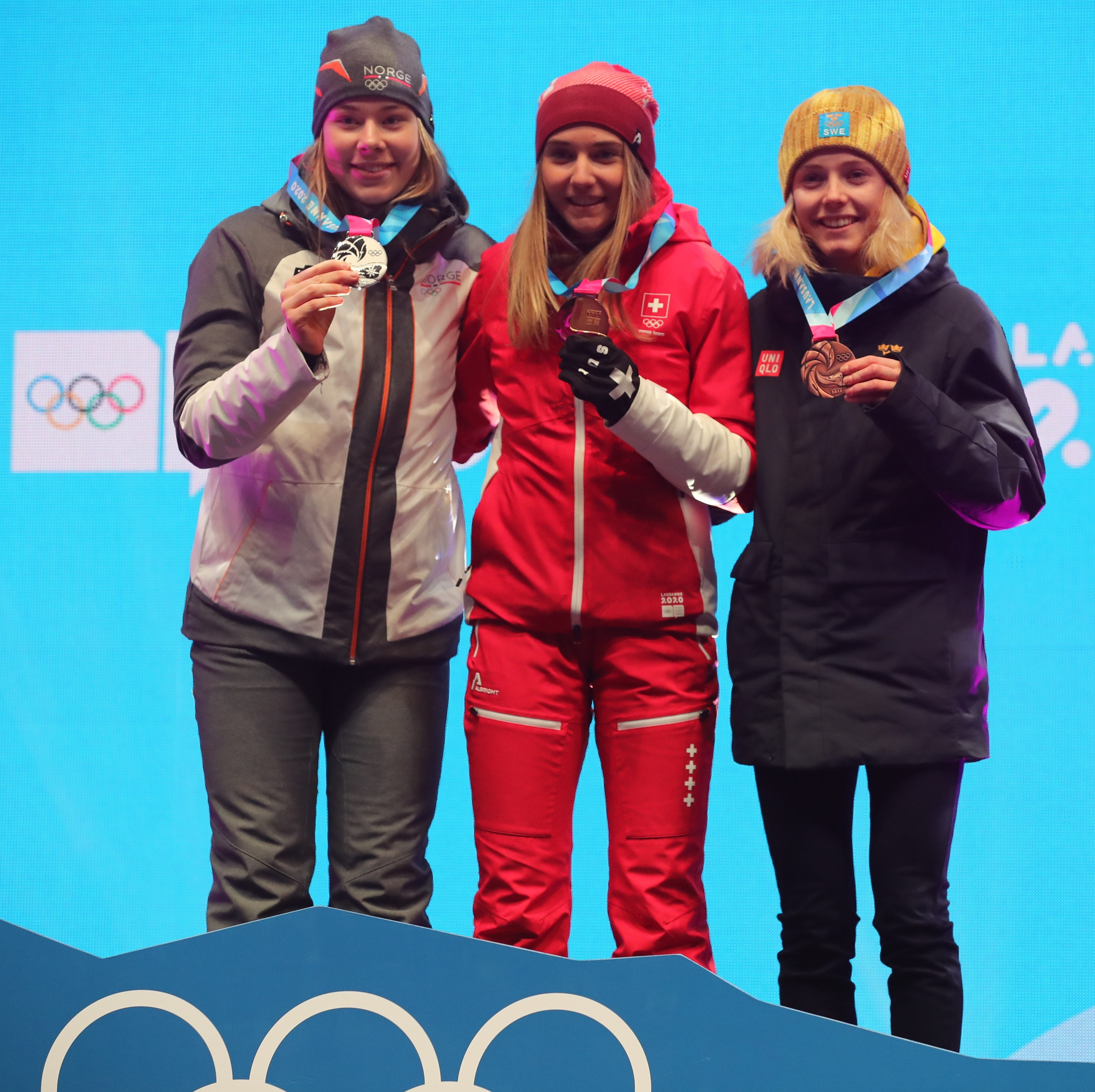
- Venue: Vallée de Joux Cross-Country Centre
- Date: 19 January
- Competitors: 83 from 41 nations

Medalists
1st place, gold medalist(s)		Siri Wigger	Switzerland
2nd place, silver medalist(s)		Anna Heggen	Norway
3rd place, bronze medalist(s)		Märta Rosenberg	Sweden

The girls' sprint freestyle cross-country skiing competition at the 2020 Winter Youth Olympics was held on 19 January at the Vallée de Joux Cross-Country Centre.

== Results ==
=== Qualifying ===
The qualifying was held at 11:30.

Rank	Bib	Athlete	Country	Time	Deficit	Note
1	7	Märta Rosenberg	Sweden	2:46.28		Q
2	1	Siri Wigger	Switzerland	2:46.63	+0.35	Q
3	21	Johanna Udras	Estonia	2:46.92	+0.64	Q
4	17	Lara Dellit	Germany	2:47.48	+1.20	Q
5	5	Tove Ericsson	Sweden	2:47.93	+1.65	Q
6	11	Klara Mali	Slovenia	2:48.40	+2.12	Q
7	20	Maria Melling	Norway	2:48.43	+2.15	Q
8	10	Eevi-Inkeri Tossavainen	Finland	2:48.80	+2.52	Q
9	33	Anna Heggen	Norway	2:49.00	+2.72	Q
10	14	Karolina Kaleta	Poland	2:49.14	+2.86	Q
11	6	Dariya Nepryaeva	Russia	2:49.51	+3.23	Q
12	4	Maëlle Veyre	France	2:50.00	+3.72	Q
13	8	Julie Pierrel	France	2:50.29	+4.01	Q
14	27	Helen Hoffmann	Germany	2:51.31	+5.03	Q
15	53	Tuva Hagen Rønning	Norway	2:51.74	+5.46	Q
16	2	Tuuli Raunio	Finland	2:52.22	+5.94	Q
17	24	Liliane Gagnon	Canada	2:52.38	+6.10	Q
18	3	Sydney Palmer-Leger	United States	2:52.98	+6.70	Q
19	12	Kristína Sivoková	Slovakia	2:53.00	+6.72	Q
20	9	Sonja Leinamo	Finland	2:53.45	+7.17	Q
21	82	Ilyuza Gusmanova	Russia	2:54.00	+7.72	Q
22	15	Kendall Kramer	United States	2:54.44	+8.16	Q
23	47	Hanna Popko	Poland	2:54.99	+8.71	Q
24	31	Marina Kälin	Switzerland	2:55.89	+9.61	Q
25	18	Germana Thannheimer	Germany	2:56.13	+9.85	Q
26	29	Francesca Cola	Italy	2:56.54	+10.26	Q
27	51	Chika Honda	Japan	2:57.31	+11.03	Q
28	22	Evgeniya Krupitskaya	Russia	2:57.46	+11.18	Q
29	25	Jasmine Drolet	Canada	2:57.95	+11.67	Q
30	34	Eliška Šibravová	Czech Republic	2:58.23	+11.95	Q
31	26	Anna Maria Logonder	Austria	2:58.53	+12.25	
32	13	Aisha Rakisheva	Kazakhstan	2:59.20	+12.92	
33	41	Tereza Prokešová	Czech Republic	3:00.24	+13.96	
34	16	Bianca Buholzer	Switzerland	3:01.02	+14.74	
35	37	Nina Seemann	United States	3:01.25	+14.97	
36	32	Anastasiia Kompaniiets	Ukraine	3:01.84	+15.56	
37	61	Silvia Campione	Italy	3:02.14	+15.86	
38	23	Witta-Luisa Walcher	Austria	3:02.20	+15.92	
39	36	Yang Lianhong	China	3:02.36	+16.08	
40	46	Kateřina Svobodová	Czech Republic	3:02.58	+16.30	
41	42	Nika Jagečić	Croatia	3:02.68	+16.40	
42	81	Iris De Martin Pinter	Italy	3:03.54	+17.26	
43	60	Dong Zhaohui	China	3:03.97	+17.69	
44	28	Karolina Kukuczka	Poland	3:04.13	+17.85	
45	40	Valeriya Batchenko	Kazakhstan	3:05.15	+18.87	
46	38	Zana Evans	Australia	3:05.88	+19.60	
47	44	Timea Mazúrová	Slovakia	3:06.33	+20.05	
48	74	Molly Jefferies	Great Britain	3:06.54	+20.26	
49	48	Magdalena Engelhardt	Austria	3:06.79	+20.51	
50	83	Hanna Machakhina	Belarus	3:07.07	+20.79	
51	54	Zoé Favre-Bonvin	France	3:07.20	+20.92	
52	49	Samanta Krampe	Latvia	3:09.32	+23.04	
53	55	Tena Hadžić	Croatia	3:10.33	+24.05	
54	71	Kristīne Brunere	Latvia	3:11.44	+25.16	
55	57	Marta Moreno	Spain	3:11.50	+25.22	
56	58	Rosie Fordham	Australia	3:11.93	+25.65	
57	35	Anastasiia Nikon	Ukraine	3:13.20	+26.92	
58	64	Eliisabet Kool	Estonia	3:13.31	+27.03	
59	43	Darya Mayorava	Belarus	3:14.30	+28.02	
60	69	Barsnyamyn Nomin-Erdene	Mongolia	3:18.09	+31.81	
61	19	Agustina Groetzner	Argentina	3:19.38	+33.10	
62	45	Styliani Giannakoviti	Greece	3:22.11	+35.83	
63	72	Eglė Savickaitė	Lithuania	3:23.80	+37.52	
64	70	Maria Jeong	South Korea	3:24.25	+37.97	
65	65	Adelina Rîmbeu	Romania	3:26.03	+39.75	
66	59	Sara Plakalović	Bosnia and Herzegovina	3:26.64	+40.36	
67	67	Dulamsürengiin Urangoo	Mongolia	3:27.22	+40.94	
68	63	Dorina Puşcariu	Romania	3:29.23	+42.95	
69	62	Özlem Ceren Dursun	Turkey	3:29.79	+43.51	
70	56	Fatma Yavuz	Turkey	3:29.95	+43.67	
71	66	Eleni Ioannou	Greece	3:32.31	+46.03	
72	50	Eduarda Ribera	Brazil	3:34.05	+47.77	
73	77	Jeon Jae-eun	South Korea	3:35.76	+49.48	
74	52	Taynara da Silva	Brazil	3:36.85	+50.57	
75	75	Eszter Kocsik	Hungary	3:38.24	+51.96	
76	30	Zoe Ojeda	Argentina	3:39.41	+53.13	
77	78	Elena Bondarets	Kyrgyzstan	3:43.37	+57.09	
78	68	Mihaela Danoska	North Macedonia	3:47.60	+1:01.32	
79	79	Duangkamon Hitchana	Thailand	3:54.62	+1:08.34	
80	73	Natalia Ayala	Chile	3:59.64	+1:13.36	
81	80	Vesna Pantić	Bosnia and Herzegovina	4:14.42	+1:28.14	
82	76	Farnoosh Shemshaki	Iran	4:15.60	+1:29.32	
	39	Hana Mazi Jamnik	Slovenia	Did not start		

=== Quarterfinals ===
Quarterfinal 1

Rank	Seed	Athlete	Country	Time	Deficit	Note
1	1	Märta Rosenberg	Sweden	2:49.63		Q
2	10	Karolina Kaleta	Poland	2:51.66	+2.03	Q
3	11	Dariya Nepryaeva	Russia	2:52.61	+2.98	
4	21	Ilyuza Gusmanova	Russia	2:53.44	+3.81	
5	20	Sonja Leinamo	Finland	2:54.27	+4.64	
6	30	Eliška Šibravová	Czech Republic	2:59.90	+10.27	

Quarterfinal 2

Rank	Seed	Athlete	Country	Time	Deficit	Note
1	4	Lara Dellit	Germany	2:46.44		Q
2	14	Helen Hoffmann	Germany	2:47.89	+1.45	Q
3	7	Maria Melling	Norway	2:49.31	+2.87	LL
4	24	Marina Kälin	Switzerland	2:49.93	+3.49	LL
5	17	Liliane Gagnon	Canada	2:53.86	+7.42	
6	27	Chika Honda	Japan	2:54.69	+8.25	

Quarterfinal 3

Rank	Seed	Athlete	Country	Time	Deficit	Note
1	5	Tove Ericsson	Sweden	2:50.07		Q
2	25	Germana Thannheimer	Germany	2:51.23	+1.16	Q
3	15	Tuva Hagen Rønning	Norway	2:51.88	+1.81	
4	26	Francesca Cola	Italy	2:54.45	+4.38	
5	16	Tuuli Raunio	Finland	2:54.59	+4.52	
6	6	Klara Mali	Slovenia	2:55.69	+5.62	

Quarterfinal 4

Rank	Seed	Athlete	Country	Time	Deficit	Note
1	2	Siri Wigger	Switzerland	2:49.02		Q
2	9	Anna Heggen	Norway	2:49.38	+0.36	Q
3	12	Maëlle Veyre	France	2:52.57	+3.55	
4	29	Jasmine Drolet	Canada	2:55.43	+6.41	
5	22	Kendall Kramer	United States	2:55.80	+6.78	
6	19	Kristína Sivoková	Slovakia	2:57.26	+8.24	

Quarterfinal 5

Rank	Seed	Athlete	Country	Time	Deficit	Note
1	3	Johanna Udras	Estonia	2:55.14		Q
2	18	Sydney Palmer-Leger	United States	2:55.53	+0.39	Q
3	13	Julie Pierrel	France	2:55.67	+0.53	
4	23	Hanna Popko	Poland	2:56.72	+1.58	
5	8	Eevi-Inkeri Tossavainen	Finland	3:05.69	+10.55	
6	28	Evgeniya Krupitskaya	Russia	3:07.97	+12.83	

=== Semifinals ===
Semifinal 1

Rank	Seed	Athlete	Country	Time	Deficit	Note
1	5	Tove Ericsson	Sweden	2:48.03		Q
2	1	Märta Rosenberg	Sweden	2:48.44	+0.41	Q
3	4	Lara Dellit	Germany	2:49.09	+1.06	LL
4	10	Karolina Kaleta	Poland	2:49.22	+1.19	
5	14	Helen Hoffmann	Germany	2:49.55	+1.52	
6	24	Marina Kälin	Switzerland	2:52.15	+4.12	

Semifinal 2

Rank	Seed	Athlete	Country	Time	Deficit	Note
1	2	Siri Wigger	Switzerland	2:46.43		Q
2	9	Anna Heggen	Norway	2:46.72	+0.29	Q
3	3	Johanna Udras	Estonia	2:48.67	+2.24	LL
4	7	Maria Melling	Norway	2:50.57	+4.14	
5	25	Germana Thannheimer	Germany	2:51.86	+5.43	
6	18	Sydney Palmer-Leger	United States	2:52.17	+5.74	

=== Final ===
The final was held at 15:22.

Rank	Seed	Athlete	Country	Time	Deficit	Note
1st place, gold medalist(s)	2	Siri Wigger	Switzerland	2:46.40		
2nd place, silver medalist(s)	9	Anna Heggen	Norway	2:47.87	+1.47	
3rd place, bronze medalist(s)	1	Märta Rosenberg	Sweden	2:48.92	+2.52	
4	4	Lara Dellit	Germany	2:53.13	+6.73	
5	3	Johanna Udras	Estonia	2:58.44	+12.04	
6	5	Tove Ericsson	Sweden	3:01.36	+14.96	
