= Özlem Ceren Dursun =

Turkish cross-country skier (born 2003)

Ceren Dursun
Personal information
- Full name: Özlem Ceren Dursun
- Nationality: Turkey
- Born: 8 December 2003 (age 22) Gerede, Bolu, Turkey

Sport
- Sport: Skiing
- Club: Akut S.C.

Özlem Ceren Dursun (born 8 December 2003) is a Turkish Olympian cross-country skier.

== Early years ==
Özlem Ceren Dursun was born in Gerede district of Bolu Province, Turkey on 8 December 2003.

== Sports career ==
Dursun started skiing sport at the age of eleven. She performs cross-country skiing. She is a member of Akut Sports Club. In 2019, she was admitted to the national team.

She participated at the sprint and 5km classical events at the 2020 Winter Youth Olympics held in Lausanne, Switzerland.

She competes at the 2022 Winter Olympics in Beijing, China.

== See also ==
- Turkey at the 2022 Winter Olympics
