= Mongolia at the 2020 Winter Youth Olympics =

- IOC code: MGL
- NOC: Mongolian National Olympic Committee
- Website: www.olympic.mn

in Lausanne
- Competitors: 6 in 2 sports
- Medals: Gold 0 Silver 0 Bronze 0 Total 0

Winter Youth Olympics appearances
- 2012; 2016; 2020; 2024

Mongolia competed at the 2020 Winter Youth Olympics in Lausanne, Switzerland from 9 to 22 January 2020.

== Biathlon ==
Athlete	Event	Time	Misses	Rank
Enkhbatyn Enkhsaikhan	Boys' sprint	22:27.3	5 (3+2)	49
Enkhbatyn Enkhsaikhan	Boys' individual	36:50.9	4 (1+1+1+1)	12
Chuluunbatyn Byambasüren	Girls' sprint	24:01.9	4 (3+1)	83
Chuluunbatyn Byambasüren	Girls' individual	46:48.2	11 (3+2+4+2)	87

== Cross-country skiing ==
Boys

Athlete	Event	Qualification		Quarterfinal		Semifinal		Final	
Athlete	Event	Time	Rank	Time	Rank	Time	Rank	Time	Rank
Batsükhiin Khongor	10 km classic	—N/a						32:06.06	61
Batsükhiin Khongor	Free sprint	3:44.37	61	Did not advance					
Batsükhiin Khongor	Cross-country cross	5:14.85	72	Did not advance					
Otgonlkhagvyn Zolbayar	10 km classic	—N/a						30:03.70	38
Otgonlkhagvyn Zolbayar	Free sprint	4:02.06	74	Did not advance					
Otgonlkhagvyn Zolbayar	Cross-country cross	4:58.58	60	Did not advance					

Girls

Athlete	Event	Qualification		Quarterfinal		Semifinal		Final	
Athlete	Event	Time	Rank	Time	Rank	Time	Rank	Time	Rank
Barsnyamyn Nomin-Erdene	5 km classic	—N/a						18:08.7	61
Barsnyamyn Nomin-Erdene	Free sprint	3:18.09	60	Did not advance					
Barsnyamyn Nomin-Erdene	Cross-country cross	5:59.79	57	Did not advance					
Dulamsürengiin Urangoo	5 km classic	—N/a						DNF	DNF
Dulamsürengiin Urangoo	Free sprint	3:27.22	67	Did not advance					
Dulamsürengiin Urangoo	Cross-country cross	6:26.51	69	Did not advance					

== See also ==
- Mongolia at the 2020 Summer Olympics
