= Finland at the 2020 Winter Youth Olympics =

- IOC code: FIN
- NOC: Finnish Olympic Committee
- Website: www.olympiakomitea.fi

in Lausanne
- Competitors: 52 in 10 sports
- Medals Ranked 13th: Gold 1 Silver 4 Bronze 0 Total 5

Winter Youth Olympics appearances
- 2012; 2016; 2020; 2024

Finland competed at the 2020 Winter Youth Olympics in Lausanne, Switzerland, from 9 to 22 January 2020.

== Medalists ==
Medals awarded to participants of mixed-NOC teams are represented in italics. These medals are not counted towards the individual NOC medal tally.

Medal	Name	Sport	Event	Date
Gold	Rosa Pohjolainen; Jaakko Tapanainen	Alpine skiing	Parallel mixed team	15 January
Silver	Emilia Kyrkkö	Ice hockey	Girls’ 3x3 mixed tournament	15 January
Silver	Juho Lukkari	Ice hockey	Boys’ 3x3 mixed tournament	15 January
Silver	Rosa Pohjolainen	Alpine skiing	Girls' giant slalom	12 January
Silver	Perttu Reponen	Nordic combined	Boys' normal hill individual/6 km	18 January

== Alpine skiing ==
Boys

Athlete	Event	Run 1		Run 2		Total	
Athlete	Event	Time	Rank	Time	Rank	Time	Rank
Eduard Hallberg	Super-G	—N/a				DNF	
Eduard Hallberg	Combined	DNF					
Eduard Hallberg	Giant slalom	1:06.47	25	1:06.37	21	2:12.84	21
Eduard Hallberg	Slalom	38.48	16	41.15	14	1:19.63	13
Jaakko Tapanainen	Super-G	—N/a				55.98	22
Jaakko Tapanainen	Combined	55.98	22	33.89	5	1:29.87	8
Jaakko Tapanainen	Giant slalom	1:04.90	11	1:05.22	10	2:10.12	10
Jaakko Tapanainen	Slalom	DNF					

Girls

Athlete	Event	Run 1		Run 2		Total	
Athlete	Event	Time	Rank	Time	Rank	Time	Rank
Maisa Kivimaki	Super-G	—N/a				59.55	31
Maisa Kivimaki	Combined	59.55	31	DNF			
Maisa Kivimaki	Giant slalom	1:11.83	39	DNS			
Maisa Kivimaki	Slalom	50.80	33	48.67	24	1:39.47	25
Rosa Pohjolainen	Super-G	—N/a				58.42	24
Rosa Pohjolainen	Combined	58.42	24	36.92	1	1:35.34	9
Rosa Pohjolainen	Giant slalom	1:04.99	1	1:03.83	6	2:08.82	2nd place, silver medalist(s)
Rosa Pohjolainen	Slalom	46.45	11	44.47	2	1:30.92	7

Mixed

Athlete	Event	Round of 16	Quarterfinals	Semifinals	Final / BM	
Athlete	Event	Opposition Result	Opposition Result	Opposition Result	Opposition Result	Rank
Rosa Pohjolainen; Jaakko Tapanainen	Team	Italy; W 4–0	Norway; W 3–1	France; W 3–1	Germany; W 4–0	1st place, gold medalist(s)

== Biathlon ==
Boys

Athlete	Event	Time	Misses	Rank
Henry Heikkinen	Sprint	23:27.8	6 (1+5)	70
Henry Heikkinen	Individual	37:37.6	5 (1+3+0+1)	19
Ville-Valtteri Karvinen	Sprint	23:13.4	6 (2+4)	62
Ville-Valtteri Karvinen	Individual	38:46.0	6 (2+2+1+1)	35
Kalle Loukkaanhuhta	Sprint	22:37.6	4 (1+3)	51
Kalle Loukkaanhuhta	Individual	39:43.9	5 (1+0+3+1)	47

Girls

Athlete	Event	Time	Misses	Rank
Olivia Halme	Sprint	20:54.2	2 (1+1)	43
Olivia Halme	Individual	DSQ		
Anni Hyvaerinen	Sprint	21:10.8	2 (0+2)	48
Anni Hyvaerinen	Individual	DSQ		
Anniina Rantala	Sprint	21:46.2	3 (2+1)	60
Anniina Rantala	Individual	43:03.3	12 (4+3+2+3)	75

Mixed

Athletes	Event	Time	Misses	Rank
Anniina Rantala; Henry Heikkinen	Single mixed relay	46:38.5	5+14	18
Anni Hyvaerinen; Olivia Halme; Ville-Valtteri Karvinen; Kalle Loukkaanhuhta	Mixed relay	1:17:29.7	3+13	12

== Cross-country skiing ==
Boys

Athlete	Event	Qualification		Quarterfinal		Semifinal		Final	
Athlete	Event	Time	Rank	Time	Rank	Time	Rank	Time	Rank
Matias Hyvönen	10 km classic	—N/a						28:15.7	14
Matias Hyvönen	Free sprint	3:26.51	30 Q	3:36.14	5	Did not advance			25
Matias Hyvönen	Cross-country cross	4:37.60	34	Did not advance					
Veeti Pyykkö	Free sprint	3:25.57	25 Q	3:23.77	4 LL	3:17.87	6	Did not advance	12
Veeti Pyykkö	Cross-country cross	4:36.65	32	Did not advance					
Alexander Ståhlberg	10 km classic	—N/a						27:32.5	4
Alexander Ståhlberg	Free sprint	3:16.82	5 Q	3:20.49	1 Q	3:13.77	3 LL	3:19.04	6
Alexander Ståhlberg	Cross-country cross	4:23.30	8 Q	—N/a		4:19.35	4 LL	4:39.93	10

Girls

Athlete	Event	Qualification		Quarterfinal		Semifinal		Final	
Athlete	Event	Time	Rank	Time	Rank	Time	Rank	Time	Rank
Sonja Leinamo	5 km classic	—N/a						16:49.1	46
Sonja Leinamo	Free sprint	2:53.45	20 Q	2:54.27	5	Did not advance			24
Sonja Leinamo	Cross-country cross	5:32.06	37	Did not advance					
Tuuli Raunio	5 km classic	—N/a						16:27.2	39
Tuuli Raunio	Free sprint	2:52.22	16 Q	2:54.59	5	Did not advance			22
Tuuli Raunio	Cross-country cross	5:26.68	30 Q	—N/a		5:21.60	8	Did not advance	24
Eevi-Inkeri Tossavainen	5 km classic	—N/a						15:51.6	26
Eevi-Inkeri Tossavainen	Free sprint	2:48.80	8 Q	3:05.69	5	Did not advance			21
Eevi-Inkeri Tossavainen	Cross-country cross	5:08.07	12 Q	—N/a		5:09.16	4	Did not advance	11

== Figure skating ==
One Finnish figure skater achieved quota places for Finland based on the results of the 2019–20 ISU Junior Grand Prix.

Singles

Athlete	Event	SP		FS		Total	
Athlete	Event	Points	Rank	Points	Rank	Points	Rank
Nella Pelkonen	Girls' singles	45.13	15	73.29	16	118.42	16

Mixed NOC team trophy

Athletes	Event	Free skate/Free dance					
Athletes	Event	Ice dance	Pairs	Girls	Boys	Total	
Athletes	Event	Points Team points	Points Team points	Points Team points	Points Team points	Points	Rank
Team Determination; Katarina Wolfkostin / Jeffrey Chen (USA); Brooke McIntosh / Brandon Toste (CAN); Nella Pelkonen (FIN); Cha Young-hyun (KOR)	Team trophy	90.41; 5	96.73; 5	91.27; 2	133.13; 6	18	4

== Freestyle skiing ==
Slopestyle & Big Air

Athlete	Event	Qualification				Final				
Athlete	Event	Run 1	Run 2	Best	Rank	Run 1	Run 2	Run 3	Best	Rank
Sampo Yliheikkila	Boys' big air	71.25	14.50	71.25	14	Did not advance				
Sampo Yliheikkila	Boys' slopestyle	45.00	32.66	45.00	19	Did not advance				

== Ice hockey ==
=== Boys' tournament ===
Summary

Key:

- OT – Overtime
- GWS – Match decided by penalty-shootout

Team	Event	Group stage			Semifinal	Final	
Team	Event	Opposition Score	Opposition Score	Rank	Opposition Score	Opposition Score	Rank
Finland boys'	Boys' tournament	United States; L 5–7	Switzerland; W 2–1	2 Q	Russia; L 1–10	Canada; L 2–4	4

Team Roster

- Thomas Gronlund
- Otto Heinonen
- Otto Hokkanen
- Tuomas Hynninen
- Aleksanteri Kaskimaki
- Joakim Kemell
- Niklas Kokko
- Kasper Kulonummi
- Elmeri Laakso
- Jere Lassila
- Topias Leinonen
- Tommi Mannisto
- Mika Monkkonen
- Jani Nyman
- Topi Ronni
- Otto Salin
- Santeri Sulku

=== Mixed NOC 3x3 tournament ===
Boys

- Juho Lukkari
- Kalle Varis

Girls

- Emilia Kyrkko

== Nordic combined ==
Individual

Athlete	Event	Ski jumping				Cross-country	
Athlete	Event	Distance	Points	Rank	Deficit	Time	Rank
Waltteri Karhumaa	Boys' normal hill/6 km	81.0	104.7	15	1:04	15:59.5	8
Perttu Reponen	Boys' normal hill/6 km	87.0	114.4	7	0:25	14:59.6	2nd place, silver medalist(s)
Annamaija Oinas	Girls' normal hill/4 km	65.5	76.9	19	2:29	14:49.9	18

== Ski jumping ==
Athlete	Event	First round			Final			Total	
Athlete	Event	Distance	Points	Rank	Distance	Points	Rank	Points	Rank
Tomas Kuisma	Boys' normal hill	72.5	79.4	30	69.5	84.0	27	163.4	29
Kasperi Valto	Boys' normal hill	76.0	84.5	27	72.5	83.7	29	168.2	27
Annamaija Oinas	Girls' normal hill	59.5	61.3	30	55.0	47.2	30	108.5	30
Julia Tervahartiala	Girls' normal hill	69.0	92.3	19	69.0	76.2	20	168.5	20
Annamaija Oinas; Waltteri Karhumaa; Julia Tervahartiala; Tomas Kuisma	Mixed team normal hill	289.5	373.1	8	271.0	352.6	10	725.7	10

== Snowboarding ==
Halfpipe, Slopestyle, & Big Air

Athlete	Event	Qualification				Final				
Athlete	Event	Run 1	Run 2	Best	Rank	Run 1	Run 2	Run 3	Best	Rank
Valtteri Kautonen	Boys' slopestyle	83.00	22.66	83.00	3 Q	32.66	28.66	36.00	36.00	7
Aatu Partanen	Boys' big air	73.75	4.75	73.75	7 Q	DNS				12
Veera Immonen	Girls' slopestyle	2.00	DNS	2.00	22	Did not advance				
Eveliina Taka	Girls' big air	16.00	15.33	16.00	18	Did not advance				
Eveliina Taka	Girls' slopestyle	32.00	38.50	38.50	10 Q	39.25	27.25	27.25	39.25	8

== Speed skating ==
Four Finnish skaters achieved quota places foi Finland based on the ISU Junior World Cup Speed Skating ranking.

Boys

Athlete	Event	Time	Rank
Eetu Käsnänen	500 m	38.97	20
Eetu Käsnänen	1500 m	2:05.55	28
Tuuka Suomalainen	500 m	38.93	19
Tuuka Suomalainen	1500 m	2:07.80	30

Mass Start

Athlete	Event	Semifinal			Final		
Athlete	Event	Points	Time	Rank	Points	Time	Rank
Eetu Käsnänen	Boys' mass start	0	5:55.67	9	Did not advance		
Tuukka Suomalainen	Boys' mass start	0	6:34.51	10	Did not advance		
Laura Kivioja	Girls' mass start	0	7:22.21	15	Did not advance		
Sini Siro	Girls' mass start	0	6:27.93	15	Did not advance		

Girls

Athlete	Event	Time	Rank
Laura Kivioja	500 m	43.41	17
Laura Kivioja	1500 m	2:19.39	17
Sini Siro	500 m	44.55	30
Sini Siro	1500 m	2:23.73	27

Mixed

Athlete	Event	Time	Rank
Team 3 Sini Siro (FIN); Yukino Yoshida (JPN); Ignaz Gschwentner (AUT); Alexander Sergeev (RUS)	Mixed team sprint	2:04.10	1st place, gold medalist(s)
Team 12; Katia Filippi (ITA); Aleksandra Rutkovskaia (RUS); Eetu Käsnänen (FIN); Remo Slotegraaf (NED)	Mixed team sprint	2:10.07	12
Team 14; Ramona Ionel (ROU); Valeriia Sorokoletova (RUS); Tuukka Suomalainen (FIN); Jonathan Tobon (USA)	Mixed team sprint	2:05.96	3rd place, bronze medalist(s)
Team 16; Laura Kivioja (FIN); Daria Kopacz (POL); Theo Collins (GBR); Motonaga Arito (JPN)	Mixed team sprint	2:05.92	2nd place, silver medalist(s)

== See also ==
- Finland at the 2020 Summer Olympics
