= Sweden at the 2020 Winter Youth Olympics =

- IOC code: SWE
- NOC: Swedish Olympic Committee
- Website: sok.se/olympiska-spel/tavlingar/yog/lausanne-2020.html (in Swedish and English)

in Lausanne
- Competitors: 51 in 9 sports
- Medals Ranked 4th: Gold 6 Silver 4 Bronze 7 Total 17

Winter Youth Olympics appearances (overview)
- 2012; 2016; 2020; 2024

Sweden competed at the 2020 Winter Youth Olympics in Lausanne, Switzerland from 9 to 22 January 2020.

== Medalists ==
Medal	Name	Sport	Event	Date
Gold	Adam Hofstedt	Alpine skiing	Boys' super-G	10 January
Gold	Emma Sahlin	Alpine skiing	Girls' slalom	14 January
Gold	Adam Hofstedt	Alpine skiing	Boys' slalom	14 January
Gold	Erik Wahlberg	Freestyle skiing	Boys' ski cross	19 January
Gold	Edvin Anger	Cross-country skiing	Boys' sprint	19 January
Gold	Märta Rosenberg	Cross-country skiing	Girls' 5 kilometres classic	21 January
Silver	Märta Rosenberg	Cross-country skiing	Girls' cross-country cross	18 January
Silver	Edvin Anger	Cross-country skiing	Boys' cross-country cross	18 January
Silver	Melvin Morén	Freestyle skiing	Boys' slopestyle	20 January
Silver	Sweden women's national under-16 ice hockey team: Linnea Adelbertsson; Anna Andersson; Pulse Dyring-Andersen; Nicole Hall; Beatrice Hjälm; Ella Jämsén; Tuva Kandell; Ida Karlsson; Klara Kenttälä; Pandora Nåtby; Tindra Oknefjell; Julia Perjus; Linnea Pettersson Dove; Frida Simonsen; Ebba Svensson Träff; Alice Wallin	Ice hockey	Girls' tournament	22 January
Bronze	Adam Hofstedt	Alpine skiing	Boys' combined	11 January
Bronze	Sara Andersson; Oscar Andersson	Biathlon	Single mixed relay	12 January
Bronze	Jennie-Lee Burmansson	Freestyle skiing	Girls' slopestyle	18 January
Bronze	Tove Ericsson	Cross-country skiing	Girls' cross-country cross	18 January
Bronze	Albin Åström	Cross-country skiing	Boys' cross-country cross	18 January
Bronze	Märta Rosenberg	Cross-country skiing	Girls' sprint	19 January
Bronze	Jennie-Lee Burmansson	Freestyle skiing	Girls' big air	22 January

== Alpine skiing ==
Boys

Athlete	Event	Run 1		Run 2		Total	
Athlete	Event	Time	Rank	Time	Rank	Time	Rank
Lukas Ermeskog	Slalom						
Lukas Ermeskog	Giant slalom						
Lukas Ermeskog	Super-G			—N/a			
Lukas Ermeskog	Combined						
Oskar Gillberg	Slalom						
Oskar Gillberg	Giant slalom						
Oskar Gillberg	Super-G			—N/a			
Oskar Gillberg	Combined						
Adam Hofstedt	Slalom						
Adam Hofstedt	Giant slalom						
Adam Hofstedt	Super-G			—N/a			
Adam Hofstedt	Combined						

Girls

Athlete	Event	Run 1		Run 2		Total	
Athlete	Event	Time	Rank	Time	Rank	Time	Rank
Hanna Aronsson Elfman	Slalom						
Hanna Aronsson Elfman	Giant slalom						
Hanna Aronsson Elfman	Super-G			—N/a			
Hanna Aronsson Elfman	Combined						
Wilma Marklund	Slalom						
Wilma Marklund	Giant slalom						
Wilma Marklund	Super-G			—N/a			
Wilma Marklund	Combined						
Emma Sahlin	Slalom						
Emma Sahlin	Giant slalom						
Emma Sahlin	Super-G			—N/a			
Emma Sahlin	Combined						

Mixed

Athletes	Event	Round of 16	Quarterfinals	Semifinals	Final	
Athletes	Event	Opposition Result	Opposition Result	Opposition Result	Opposition Result	Rank
	Parallel team					

== Biathlon ==
Boys

Athlete	Event	Time	Misses	Rank
Oscar Andersson	Sprint	20:01.3	2 (2+0)	7
Oscar Andersson	Individual	37:32.3	6 (1+1+3+1)	16
Victor Berglund	Sprint	22:27.1	6 (2+4)	47
Victor Berglund	Individual	37:11.5	5 (1+2+1+1)	13
Fabian Hermansson	Sprint	21:32.8	2 (2+0)	29
Fabian Hermansson	Individual	37:20.5	3 (0+0+2+1)	15

Girls

Athlete	Event	Time	Misses	Rank
Klara Andersson	Sprint	22:37.0	3 (1+2)	71
Klara Andersson	Individual	40:44.6	6 (1+2+2+1)	63
Sara Andersson	Sprint	20:23.1	2 (2+0)	27
Sara Andersson	Individual	37:31.1	6 (0+2+1+3)	29
Wilma Björn	Sprint	21:45.5	2 (1+1)	59
Wilma Björn	Individual	38:36.0	6 (2+1+1+2)	43

Mixed

Athlete	Event	Time	Misses	Rank
Sara Andersson; Oscar Andersson	Single mixed relay	42:30.3	2+12	3rd place, bronze medalist(s)
Wilma Björn; Klara Andersson; Fabian Hermansson; Oscar Andersson	Mixed relay	1:19:01.1	3+14	15

== Bobsleigh ==
Athlete	Event	Run 1		Run 2		Total	
Athlete	Event	Time	Rank	Time	Rank	Time	Rank
Theodor Lööv von Hage	Boys' monobob	1:15.02	15	1:15.20	16	2:30.22	14

== Cross-country skiing ==
Boys

Athlete	Event	Qualification		Quarterfinal		Semifinal		Final	
Athlete	Event	Time	Rank	Time	Rank	Time	Rank	Time	Rank
Edvin Anger	10 km classic	—N/a							
Edvin Anger	Sprint freestyle								
Edvin Anger	Cross-country cross								
Albin Åström	10 km classic	—N/a							
Albin Åström	Sprint freestyle								
Albin Åström	Cross-country cross								

Girls

Athlete	Event	Qualification		Quarterfinal		Semifinal		Final	
Athlete	Event	Time	Rank	Time	Rank	Time	Rank	Time	Rank
Tove Ericsson	5 km classic	—N/a							
Tove Ericsson	Sprint freestyle								
Tove Ericsson	Cross-country cross								
Märta Rosenberg	5 km classic	—N/a							
Märta Rosenberg	Sprint freestyle								
Märta Rosenberg	Cross-country cross								

== Curling ==
Mixed team

Team	Event	Group Stage						Quarterfinal	Semifinal	Final / BM	
Team	Event	Opposition Score	Opposition Score	Opposition Score	Opposition Score	Opposition Score	Rank	Opposition Score	Opposition Score	Opposition Score	Rank
Nilla Hallström; Axel Landelius; Lisa Norrlander; Olle Moberg	Mixed team	Japan; L 4 – 7	Italy; L 3 – 7	Czech Republic; W 8 – 2	Latvia; W 9 – 7	United States; W 8 – 3	3	did not advance			10

Mixed doubles

Athletes	Event	Round of 48	Round of 24	Round of 12	Round of 6	Semifinals	Final / BM	
Athletes	Event	Opposition Result	Opposition Result	Opposition Result	Opposition Result	Opposition Result	Opposition Result	Rank
	Mixed doubles							

== Freestyle skiing ==
Ski cross

Athlete	Event	Group heats		Semifinal	Final
Athlete	Event	Points	Rank	Position	Position
Fredrik Nilsson	Boys' ski cross	19	2 Q	3 FB	6
Erik Wahlberg	Boys' ski cross	18	3 Q	1 FA	1st place, gold medalist(s)
Alice Fortkord	Girls' ski cross	17	4 Q	3 FB	7
Lia Nilsson	Girls' ski cross	13	8	did not advance	

Slopestyle and big air

Athlete	Event	Qualification				Final			
Athlete	Event	Run 1	Run 2	Best	Rank	Run 1	Run 2	Best	Rank
Melvin Morén	Boys' slopestyle								
Melvin Morén	Boys' big air								
Martin Nordqvist	Boys' slopestyle								
Martin Nordqvist	Boys' big air								
Jennie-Lee Burmansson	Girls' slopestyle								
Jennie-Lee Burmansson	Girls' big air								
Wilma Johansson	Girls' slopestyle								
Wilma Johansson	Girls' big air								

== Ice hockey ==
=== Tournaments ===
Summary

Team	Event	Group Stage			Semifinal	Final / BM	
Team	Event	Opposition Score	Opposition Score	Rank	Opposition Score	Opposition Score	Rank
Sweden girls	Girls' tournament	Slovakia; W 3–2 (GWS)	Germany; W 7–2	1 Q	Switzerland; W 2–0	Japan; L 1–4	2nd place, silver medalist(s)

=== 3x3 tournaments ===
Summary

Team	Event	Group Stage								Semifinal	Final / BM	
Team	Event	Opposition Score	Opposition Score	Opposition Score	Opposition Score	Opposition Score	Opposition Score	Opposition Score	Rank	Opposition Score	Opposition Score	Rank
Team Grey; Lukas Svedin (SWE); Alexei Baidek (KAZ); Boldizsar Szalay (HUN); Nino Tomov (BUL); Jan Billa (AUT); Patrik Melicher (SVK); Hyun Sohn (KOR); Pablo Mata (ESP); Timofei Katkov (RUS); Gosei Daikuhara (JPN); Novruz Bayhanov (TKM); Alejandro Resendiz (MEX); Thawab Al-Subaey (QAT)	Boys' 3x3	Team Blue (MIX)	Team Yellow (MIX)	Team White (MIX)	Team Red (MIX)	Team Green (MIX)	Team Black (MIX)	Team Orange (MIX)				
Team Grey; Sofie van Dueren (SWE); Jelizaveta Stadnika (LAT); Dorottya Gengeliczky (HUN); Eunji Lee (KOR); Ebony Brunt (AUS); Yekaterina Davletshina (RUS); Marketa Mazancova (CZE); Shuqi Zhang (CHN); Ilary Larese de Pasqua (ITA); Emilia Munteanu (ROU); Lina Meijer (LUX); Valentina Vrhoci (SRB); Siria Dore (SUI)	Girls' 3x3	Team Blue (MIX)	Team Yellow (MIX)	Team White (MIX)	Team Red (MIX)	Team Green (MIX)	Team Black (MIX)	Team Orange (MIX)				

== Skeleton ==
Athlete	Event	Run 1		Run 2		Total	
Athlete	Event	Time	Rank	Time	Rank	Time	Rank
Lovisa Ewald	Girls'	1:12.58	9	1:11.43	2	2:24.01	6
Paulina Ewald Gröndal	Girls'	1:15.62	18	1:16.16	18	2:31.78	18

== Snowboarding ==
Slopestyle and big air

Athlete	Event	Qualification				Final				
Athlete	Event	Run 1	Run 2	Best	Rank	Run 1	Run 2	Run 3	Best	Rank
William Mathisen	Boys' big air	64.75	19.00	64.75	13	did not advance				
William Mathisen	Boys' slopestyle	63.66	64.66	64.66	9 Q	51.66	22.33	34.00	51.66	5
