= South Korea at the 2020 Winter Youth Olympics =

- IOC code: KOR
- NOC: Korean Olympic Committee
- Website: www.sports.or.kr

in Lausanne
- Competitors: 40 in 13 sports
- Medals: Gold 5 Silver 3 Bronze 0 Total 8

Winter Youth Olympics appearances (overview)
- 2012; 2016; 2020; 2024

South Korea competed at the 2020 Winter Youth Olympics in Lausanne, Switzerland, from 9 to 22 January 2020.

South Korea competed 13 sports and has 40 competitors. On the final day, the country brings home 8 medals (5 golds and 3 silver).

Gangwon was announced as the next Winter Youth Olympics host province, during the closing ceremony.

== Medalists ==
Medals awarded to participants of mixed-NOC teams are represented in italics. These medals are not counted towards the individual NOC medal tally.

| Medal | Name | Sport | Event | Date |
|---|---|---|---|---|
| Gold | You Young | Figure skating | Girls' singles | 13 January |
| Gold | Shin Seo-yoon | Ice hockey | Girls' 3x3 mixed tournament | 15 January |
| Gold | Seo Whi-min | Short track speed skating | Girls' 1000 metres | 18 January |
| Gold | Jang Sung-woo | Short track speed skating | Boys' 1000 metres | 18 January |
| Gold | Seo Whi-min | Short track speed skating | Girls' 500 metres | 20 January |
| Gold | Lee Jeong-min | Short track speed skating | Boys' 500 metres | 20 January |
| Silver | Kim Chan-seo | Short track speed skating | Girls' 1000 metres | 18 January |
| Silver | Lee Jeong-min | Short track speed skating | Boys' 1000 metres | 18 January |
| Silver | Jang Sung-woo | Short track speed skating | Boys' 500 metres | 20 January |

== Alpine skiing ==
Boys

| Athlete | Event | Run 1 | | Run 2 | | Total | |
| Athlete | Event | Time | Rank | Time | Rank | Time | Rank |
|---|---|---|---|---|---|---|---|
| Kim Si-won | Super-G | —N/a | | | | 1:01.96 | 53 |
| Kim Si-won | Combined | 1:01.96 | 53 | 37.09 | 31 | 1:39.05 | 32 |
| Kim Si-won | Giant slalom | 1:08.30 | 32 | 1:09.56 | 30 | 2:17.86 | 28 |
| Kim Si-won | Slalom | DNF | | | | | |

Girls

| Athlete | Event | Run 1 | | Run 2 | | Total | |
| Athlete | Event | Time | Rank | Time | Rank | Time | Rank |
|---|---|---|---|---|---|---|---|
| Lee Ha-eun | Super-G | —N/a | | | | 1:01.61 | 39 |
| Lee Ha-eun | Combined | 1:01.61 | 39 | DNF | | | |
| Lee Ha-eun | Giant slalom | 1:11.17 | 38 | 1:08.02 | 23 | 2:19.19 | 23 |
| Lee Ha-eun | Slalom | DNF | | | | | |

== Biathlon ==
Boys

| Athlete | Event | Time | Misses | Rank |
|---|---|---|---|---|
| Cheon Yun-pil | Sprint | 23:33.5 | 4 (2+2) | 71 |
| Cheon Yun-pil | Individual | 44:24.7 | 10 (3+3+2+2) | 86 |

Girls

| Athlete | Event | Time | Misses | Rank |
|---|---|---|---|---|
| Choi Yoo-nah | Sprint | 21:53.8 | 2 (1+1) | 64 |
| Choi Yoo-nah | Individual | 39:07.2 | 4 (1+2+0+1) | 48 |

Mixed

| Athletes | Event | Time | Misses | Rank |
|---|---|---|---|---|
| Choi Yoo-nah; Cheon Yun-pil | Single mixed relay | 50:41.1 | 4+18 | 25 |

== Bobsleigh ==
| Athlete | Event | Run 1 | | Run 2 | | Total | |
| Athlete | Event | Time | Rank | Time | Rank | Time | Rank |
|---|---|---|---|---|---|---|---|
| Kim Ji-min | Boys' | 1:13.66 | 7 | 1:12.87 | 7 | 2:26.53 | 6 |
| Joo Hyeon-gon | Girls' | 1:15.25 | 12 | 1:14.73 | 9 | 2:29.98 | 9 |

== Cross-country skiing ==
Boys

| Athlete | Event | Qualification | | Quarterfinal | | Semifinal | | Final | |
| Athlete | Event | Time | Rank | Time | Rank | Time | Rank | Time | Rank |
|---|---|---|---|---|---|---|---|---|---|
| Jeon Sung-min | 10 km classic | —N/a | | | | | | 30:15.4 | 40 |
| Jeon Sung-min | Free sprint | 3:41.88 | 58 | Did not advance | | | | | |
| Jeon Sung-min | Cross-country cross | 4:50.54 | 54 | Did not advance | | | | | |
| Lee Jin-bok | 10 km classic | —N/a | | | | | | 28:38.2 | 21 |
| Lee Jin-bok | Free sprint | 3:31.58 | 42 | Did not advance | | | | | |
| Lee Jin-bok | Cross-country cross | 4:41.09 | 41 | Did not advance | | | | | |

Girls

| Athlete | Event | Qualification | | Quarterfinal | | Semifinal | | Final | |
| Athlete | Event | Time | Rank | Time | Rank | Time | Rank | Time | Rank |
|---|---|---|---|---|---|---|---|---|---|
| Jeon Jae-eun | 5 km classic | —N/a | | | | | | 18:07.6 | 60 |
| Jeon Jae-eun | Free sprint | 3:35.76 | 73 | Did not advance | | | | | |
| Jeon Jae-eun | Cross-country cross | 6:25.46 | 67 | Did not advance | | | | | |
| Maria Jeong | 5 km classic | —N/a | | | | | | 18:11.0 | 62 |
| Maria Jeong | Free sprint | 3:24.25 | 64 | Did not advance | | | | | |
| Maria Jeong | Cross-country cross | 6:22.69 | 66 | Did not advance | | | | | |

== Curling ==
South Korea qualified a mixed team of four athletes.

Mixed team

| Team | Event | Group stage | | | | | | Quarterfinal | Semifinal | Final / BM | |
| Team | Event | Opposition Score | Opposition Score | Opposition Score | Opposition Score | Opposition Score | Rank | Opposition Score | Opposition Score | Opposition Score | Rank |
|---|---|---|---|---|---|---|---|---|---|---|---|
| Park Sang-woo; Park You-been; Moon Si-woo; Kim Ji-yoon | Mixed team | Estonia; W 15 – 3 | Russia; L 2 – 9 | Canada; L 3 – 6 | Poland; W 5 – 3 | Spain; W 10 – 2 | 3 | Did not advance | | | 12 |

Mixed doubles

| Athletes | Event | Round of 48 | Round of 24 | Round of 12 | Round of 6 | Semifinals | Final / BM | |
| Athletes | Event | Opposition Result | Opposition Result | Opposition Result | Opposition Result | Opposition Result | Opposition Result | Rank |
|---|---|---|---|---|---|---|---|---|
| Kim Ji-yoon (KOR); Jonathan Vilandt (DEN) | Mixed doubles | Gregori (SLO); Winz (SUI); L 3–7 | Did not advance | | | | | 25 |
| Zuzana Pražáková (CZE); Moon Si-woo (KOR) | Mixed doubles | Kobayashi (JPN); Tuaz (FRA); L 5–6 | Did not advance | | | | | 25 |
| İfayet Çalıkuşu (TUR); Park Sang-woo (KOR) | Mixed doubles | Denisenko (RUS); Seļiverstovs (LAT); L 3–10 | Did not advance | | | | | 25 |
| Park You-been (KOR); Robert Kamiński (POL) | Mixed doubles | Schumakow (USA); De Zanna (ITA); W 8–7 | Mitchell (GBR); Jiral (CZE); L 5–6 | Did not advance | | | | 13 |

== Figure skating ==
One figure skaters achieved quota places for South Korea based on the results of the 2019 World Junior Figure Skating Championships.

Singles

| Athlete | Event | SP | | FS | | Total | |
| Athlete | Event | Points | Rank | Points | Rank | Points | Rank |
|---|---|---|---|---|---|---|---|
| Cha Young-hyun | Boys' singles | 69.61 | 5 | 129.51 | 5 | 199.12 | 5 |
| You Young | Girls' singles | 73.51 | 1 | 140.49 | 1 | 214.00 | 1st place, gold medalist(s) |

Mixed NOC team trophy

| Athletes | Event | Free skate/Free dance | | | | | |
| Athletes | Event | Ice dance | Pairs | Girls | Boys | Total | |
| Athletes | Event | Points Team points | Points Team points | Points Team points | Points Team points | Points | Rank |
|---|---|---|---|---|---|---|---|
| Team Determination; Katarina Wolfkostin / Jeffrey Chen (USA); Brooke McIntosh / Brandon Toste (CAN); Nella Pelkonen (FIN); Cha Young-hyun (KOR) | Team trophy | 90.41; 5 | 96.73; 5 | 91.27; 2 | 133.13; 6 | 18 | 4 |

== Freestyle skiing ==
Slopestyle & Big Air

| Athlete | Event | Qualification | | | | Final | | | | |
| Athlete | Event | Run 1 | Run 2 | Best | Rank | Run 1 | Run 2 | Run 3 | Best | Rank |
|---|---|---|---|---|---|---|---|---|---|---|
| Heo Seong-uk | Boys' halfpipe | 33.00 | 19.33 | 33.00 | 13 | Did not advance | | | | |
| Hong Jae-won | Boys' halfpipe | 39.00 | 37.33 | 39.00 | 12 | Did not advance | | | | |

== Ice hockey ==
Boys

- Hong Seung-woo
- Kim San-gyeob
- Sohn Hyun

Girls

- Kang Si-hyun
- Lee Eun-ji
- Shin Seo-yoon
- Yoo Seo-young

== Short track speed skating ==
Four skaters achieved quota places for South Korea based on the results of the 2019 World Junior Short Track Speed Skating Championships.

Boys

| Athlete | Event | Heats | | Quarterfinal | | Semifinal | | Final | |
| Athlete | Event | Time | Rank | Time | Rank | Time | Rank | Time | Rank |
|---|---|---|---|---|---|---|---|---|---|
| Jang Sung-woo | 500 m# | 42.070 | 1 Q | 41.040 | 2 Q | 40.989 | 2 FA | 41.000 | 2nd place, silver medalist(s) |
| Jang Sung-woo | 1000 m | 1:27.573 | 2 Q | 1:34.626 | 1 Q | 1:45.114 | 1 FA | 1:33.531 | 1st place, gold medalist(s) |
| Lee Jeong-min | 500 m | 41.625 | 1 Q | 40.972 | 2 Q | 41.454 | 1 FA | 40.772 | 1st place, gold medalist(s) |
| Lee Jeong-min | 1000 m | 1:41.031 | 1 Q | 1:34.714 | 2 Q | 1:45.220 | 2 FA | 1:33.646 | 2nd place, silver medalist(s) |

Girls

| Athlete | Event | Heats | | Quarterfinal | | Semifinal | | Final | |
| Athlete | Event | Time | Rank | Time | Rank | Time | Rank | Time | Rank |
|---|---|---|---|---|---|---|---|---|---|
| Kim Chan-seo | 500 m | 45.972 | 1 Q | 45.528 | 2 Q | 44.135 | 3 FB | 45.327 | 4 |
| Kim Chan-seo | 1000 m | 1:49.254 | 1 Q | 1:59.433 | 3 ADV | 1:27.833 | 2 FA | 1:29.538 | 2nd place, silver medalist(s) |
| Seo Whi-min | 500 m | 44.235 | 1 Q | 43.894 | 1 Q | 43.513 | 1 Q | 43.483 | 1st place, gold medalist(s) |
| Seo Whi-min | 1000 m | 1:53.546 | 1 Q | 1:31.586 | 1 Q | 1:27.692 | 1 Q | 1:29.439 | 1st place, gold medalist(s) |

== Skeleton ==
| Athlete | Event | Run 1 | | Run 2 | | Total | |
| Athlete | Event | Time | Rank | Time | Rank | Time | Rank |
|---|---|---|---|---|---|---|---|
| Lee Seo-hyuk | Boys' | 1:10.37 | 6 | 1:10.68 | 9 | 2:21.05 | 7 |

== Ski mountaineering ==
Boys

| Athlete | Event | Time | Rank |
|---|---|---|---|
| Kim Min-jun | Individual | 1:32:33.23 | 23 |

Girls

| Athlete | Event | Time | Rank |
|---|---|---|---|
| Lim Hyo-shin | Individual | DNF | |

Sprint

| Athlete | Event | Qualification | | Quarterfinal | | Semifinal | | Final | |
| Athlete | Event | Time | Rank | Time | Rank | Time | Rank | Time | Rank |
|---|---|---|---|---|---|---|---|---|---|
| Kim Min-jun | Boys' sprint | 4:29.97 | 24 | 4:41.24 | 6 | Did not advance | | | |
| Lim Hyo-shin | Individual | DNS | | | | | | | |

== Snowboarding ==
Snowboard cross

| Athlete | Event | Group heats | | Semifinal | Final |
| Athlete | Event | Points | Rank | Position | Position |
|---|---|---|---|---|---|
| Seo Gy-yeong | Boys' snowboard cross | 9 | 13 | Did not advance | |

Halfpipe, Slopestyle, & Big Air

| Athlete | Event | Qualification | | | | Final | | | | |
| Athlete | Event | Run 1 | Run 2 | Best | Rank | Run 1 | Run 2 | Run 3 | Best | Rank |
|---|---|---|---|---|---|---|---|---|---|---|
| Lee Hyun-jun | Boys' halfpipe | 82.00 | 38.00 | 82.00 | 6 Q | 77.00 | 23.66 | 54.00 | 77.00 | 4 |
| Lee Joon-sik | Boys' halfpipe | 27.00 | DNS | 27.00 | 17 | Did not advance | | | | |
| Lee Na-yoon | Girls' halfpipe | 48.33 | 36.00 | 48.33 | 8 Q | 33.66 | 36.66 | 39.66 | 39.66 | 7 |

== Speed skating ==
Three skaters achieved quota places for South Korea based on the results of the 2019 World Junior Speed Skating Championships.

Boys

| Athlete | Event | Time | Rank |
|---|---|---|---|
| Park Sang-eon | 500 m | 38.56 | 15 |
| Park Sang-eon | 1500 m | 1:57.15 | 7 |
| Yang Suk-hoon | 500 m | 37.66 | 7 |
| Yang Suk-hoon | 1500 m | 2:04.61 | 25 |

Girls

| Athlete | Event | Time | Rank |
|---|---|---|---|
| Kang Soo-min | 500 m | 42.99 | 15 |
| Kang Soo-min | 1500 m | 2:17.28 | 13 |
| Kim Min-hui | 500 m | 41.60 | 5 |
| Kim Min-hui | 1500 m | 2:23.48 | 26 |

Mass Start

| Athlete | Event | Semifinal | | | Final | | |
| Athlete | Event | Points | Time | Rank | Points | Time | Rank |
|---|---|---|---|---|---|---|---|
| Park Sang-eon | Boys' mass start | 22 | 6:32.70 | 2 Q | 0 | 6:31.18 | 11 |
| Yang Suk-hoon | Boys' mass start | 0 | 6:09.73 | 14 | Did not advance | | |
| Kang Soo-min | Girls' mass start | 30 | 6:48.34 | 1 Q | 2 | 6:51.18 | 6 |
| Kim Min-hui | Girls' mass start | 0 | 6:21.45 | 12 | Did not advance | | |

Mixed

| Athlete | Event | Time | Rank |
|---|---|---|---|
| Team 5 Amalie Haugland (NOR); Kim Min-hui (KOR); Oddbjørn Mellemstrand (CZE); Jordan Stolz (NED) | Mixed team sprint | Disqualified | |
| Team 9 Serena Pergher (ITA); Ilka Füzesy (ROU); Yang Suk-hoon (KOR); Nil Llop (ESP) | Mixed team sprint | 2:06.33 | 4 |
| Team 10; Marta Dobrowolska (POL); Yuka Takahashi (JPN); Michał Kopacz (POL); Park Sang-eon (KOR) | Mixed team sprint | 2:08.62 | 10 |
| Team 15; Hanna Bíró (HUN); Kang Soo-min (KOR); Yevgeniy Koshkin (KAZ); Pavel Taran (RUS) | Mixed team sprint | 2:07.27 | 6 |

== See also ==
- South Korea at the 2020 Summer Olympics
