= Norway at the 2020 Winter Youth Olympics =

- IOC code: NOR
- NOC: Norwegian Olympic Committee
- Website: www.idrett.no

in Lausanne
- Medals Ranked 8th: Gold 4 Silver 2 Bronze 3 Total 9

Winter Youth Olympics appearances
- 2012; 2016; 2020; 2024

Norway competed at the 2020 Winter Youth Olympics in Lausanne, Switzerland from 9 to 22 January 2020.

== Medalists ==
| Medal | Name | Sport | Event | Date |
|---|---|---|---|---|
| Gold | Mikkel Remsøy | Alpine skiing | Boys' combined | 11 January |
| Gold | Patrik Dalen | Ice hockey | Boys' 3x3 mixed tournament | 15 January |
| Gold | Nora Pollestad | Ice hockey | Girls' 3x3 mixed tournament | 15 January |
| Gold | Lukas Høstmælingen; Grunde Burås; Nora Østgård; Ingeborg Forbregd | Curling | Mixed team | 16 January |
| Gold | Nikolai Holmbø | Cross-country skiing | Boys' cross-country cross | 18 January |
| Gold | Gyda Westvold Hansen; Sebastian Østvold; Nora Midtsundstad; Iver Olaussen; Maria Hartz Melling; Nikolai Holmboe | Nordic combined | Mixed team normal hill/4×3.3 km | 22 January |
| Silver | Sander Salvær | Ice hockey | Boys' 3x3 mixed tournament | 15 January |
| Silver | Anna Heggen | Cross-country skiing | Girls' sprint | 19 January |
| Silver | Nikolai Holmbø | Cross-country skiing | Boys' sprint | 19 January |
| Bronze | Vegard Thon | Biathlon | Boys' sprint | 14 January |
| Bronze | Sebastian Aarsund | Ice hockey | Boys' 3x3 mixed tournament | 15 January |
| Bronze | Sebastian Østvold | Nordic combined | Boys' normal hill individual/6 km | 18 January |
| Bronze | Aleksander Holmbø | Cross-country skiing | Boys' sprint | 19 January |

== Alpine skiing ==
Boys

| Athlete | Event | Run 1 | | Run 2 | | Total | |
| Athlete | Event | Time | Rank | Time | Rank | Time | Rank |
|---|---|---|---|---|---|---|---|
| Sindre Myklebust | Super-G | —N/a | | | | DNF | |
| Sindre Myklebust | Combined | DNF | | | | | |
| Sindre Myklebust | Giant slalom | 1:04.43 | 5 | 1:04.82 | 6 | 2:09.25 | 6 |
| Sindre Myklebust | Slalom | | | | | | |
| Mikkel Remsøy | Super-G | —N/a | | | | 55.04 | 6 |
| Mikkel Remsøy | Combined | 55.04 | 6 | 33.37 | 2 | 1:28.41 | 1st place, gold medalist(s) |
| Mikkel Remsøy | Giant slalom | DNF | | | | | |
| Mikkel Remsøy | Slalom | | | | | | |
| Simen Sellæg | Super-G | —N/a | | | | 55.21 | 8 |
| Simen Sellæg | Combined | 55.21 | 8 | 35.12 | 15 | 1:30.33 | 11 |
| Simen Sellæg | Giant slalom | DNF | | | | | |
| Simen Sellæg | Slalom | | | | | | |

Girls

| Athlete | Event | Run 1 | | Run 2 | | Total | |
| Athlete | Event | Time | Rank | Time | Rank | Time | Rank |
|---|---|---|---|---|---|---|---|
| Cathinka Lunder | Super-G | —N/a | | | | 57.85 | 19 |
| Cathinka Lunder | Combined | 57.85 | 19 | 40.89 | 25 | 1:38.74 | 20 |
| Cathinka Lunder | Giant slalom | 1:07.30 | 20 | 1:05.17 | 17 | 2:12.47 | 16 |
| Cathinka Lunder | Slalom | | | | | | |
| Sara Madelene Marøy | Super-G | —N/a | | | | DNF | |
| Sara Madelene Marøy | Combined | DNF | | | | | |
| Sara Madelene Marøy | Giant slalom | 1:09.81 | 32 | DNF | | | |
| Sara Madelene Marøy | Slalom | | | | | | |
| Malin Sofie Sund | Super-G | —N/a | | | | 57.51 | 17 |
| Malin Sofie Sund | Combined | 57.51 | 17 | 38.17 | 7 | 1:35.68 | 11 |
| Malin Sofie Sund | Giant slalom | 1:07.35 | 22 | DNF | | | |
| Malin Sofie Sund | Slalom | | | | | | |

== Biathlon ==
Boys

| Athlete | Event | Time | Misses | Rank |
|---|---|---|---|---|
| Stian Fedreheim | Sprint | 20:38.0 | 3 (1+2) | 16 |
| Stian Fedreheim | Individual | 35:13.8 | 3 (1+2+0+0) | 5 |
| Isak Frey | Sprint | 20:27.0 | 4 (1+3) | 14 |
| Isak Frey | Individual | 38:04.2 | 8 (1+3+1+3) | 23 |
| Emil Hage Streitlien | Sprint | 20:51.7 | 3 (1+2) | 19 |
| Emil Hage Streitlien | Individual | 37:56.0 | 6 (0+3+1+2) | 21 |
| Vegard Thon | Sprint | 19:42.3 | 1 (0+1) | 3rd place, bronze medalist(s) |
| Vegard Thon | Individual | 36:00.4 | 4 (0+0+1+3) | 9 |

Girls

| Athlete | Event | Time | Misses | Rank |
|---|---|---|---|---|
| Synne Herheim | Sprint | 20:42.4 | 5 (4+1) | 33 |
| Synne Herheim | Individual | 36:50.9 | 8 (1+2+3+2) | 22 |
| Herborg Idland | Sprint | 20:39.5 | 2 (1+1) | 31 |
| Herborg Idland | Individual | 39:55.6 | 7 (0+2+1+4) | 54 |
| Gro Njølstad Randby | Sprint | 20:14.8 | 4 (1+3) | 26 |
| Gro Njølstad Randby | Individual | 35:22.1 | 5 (1+1+1+2) | 9 |
| Gunn Kristi Stensaker Tvinnereim | Sprint | 19:58.8 | 2 (1+1) | 19 |
| Gunn Kristi Stensaker Tvinnereim | Individual | 34:53.6 | 3 (0+1+1+1) | 7 |

Mixed

| Athletes | Event | Time | Misses | Rank |
|---|---|---|---|---|
| Gunn Kristi Stensaker Tvinnereim; Stian Fedreheim | Single mixed relay | 43:59.9 | 1+18 | 10 |
| Gro Njølstad Randby; Gunn Kristi Stensaker Tvinnereim; Stian Fedreheim; Vegard Thon | Mixed relay | 1:13:20.6 | 2+16 | 5 |

== Curling ==
Norway qualified a mixed team of four athletes.

Mixed team

| Team | Event | Group Stage | | | | | | Quarterfinal | Semifinal | Final / BM | |
| Team | Event | Opposition Score | Opposition Score | Opposition Score | Opposition Score | Opposition Score | Rank | Opposition Score | Opposition Score | Opposition Score | Rank |
|---|---|---|---|---|---|---|---|---|---|---|---|
| Lukas Høstmælingen; Grunde Buraas; Nora Østgård; Ingeborg Forbregd | Mixed team | Turkey; W 9–1 | Slovenia; L 5–6 | Great Britain; W 8–3 | New Zealand; L 5–6 | France; W 11–6 | 2 Q | Italy; W 8–6 | Russia; W 7–2 | Japan; W 5–4 | 1st place, gold medalist(s) |

Mixed doubles

| Athletes | Event | Round of 48 | Round of 24 | Round of 12 | Round of 6 | Semifinals | Final / BM | |
| Athletes | Event | Opposition Result | Opposition Result | Opposition Result | Opposition Result | Opposition Result | Opposition Result | Rank |
|---|---|---|---|---|---|---|---|---|
| Ingeborg Forbregd (NOR); Ričards Vonda (LAT) | Mixed doubles | Jensen (DEN); Zhai (CHN); L 5–10 | did not advance | | | | | |

== Speed skating ==
One Norwegian skater achieved quota place for Norway based on the results of the 2019 World Junior Speed Skating Championships.

Girls

| Athlete | Event | Race 1 | | Race 2 | | Final | |
| Athlete | Event | Time | Rank | Time | Rank | Time | Rank |
|---|---|---|---|---|---|---|---|
| | 500 m | | | | | | |
| | 1500 m | —N/a | | | | | |
| | Mass start | —N/a | | | | | |

== See also ==
- Norway at the 2020 Summer Olympics
