= Russia at the 2020 Winter Youth Olympics =

- IOC code: RUS
- NOC: Russian Olympic Committee
- Website: www.olympic.ru (in Russian)

in Lausanne
- Competitors: 104 in 16 sports
- Flag bearer (opening): Evgeniia Dolzhenkova
- Flag bearer (closing): Nikolai Lysakov
- Medals Ranked 1st: Gold 10 Silver 11 Bronze 8 Total 29

Winter Youth Olympics appearances (overview)
- 2012; 2016; 2020; 2024

Russia took part at the 2020 Winter Youth Olympics in Lausanne, Switzerland from 9 to 22 January 2020. A total of 104 athletes competed in 16 sports. Russian athletes won a record of 10 gold, 11 silver and 8 bronze medals, topping host Switzerland in the overall ranking.

== Medalists ==
Medals awarded to participants of mixed-NOC teams are represented in italics. These medals are not counted towards the individual NOC medal tally.

Medal	Name	Sport	Event	Date
Gold	Alena Mokhova	Biathlon	Girls' individual	11 January
Gold	Oleg Domichek	Biathlon	Boys' individual	11 January
Gold	Apollinariia Panfilova; Dmitry Rylov	Figure skating	Pair skating	12 January
Gold	Irina Khavronina; Dario Cirisano	Figure skating	Ice dancing	13 January
Gold	Alena Mokhova	Biathlon	Girls' sprint	14 January
Gold	Alexander Sergeev	Speed skating	Mixed team sprint	15 January
Gold	Artyom Pronichkin	Ice hockey	Boys' 3x3 mixed tournament	15 January
Gold	Ksenia Sinitsyna	Figure skating	Team trophy	15 January
Gold	Anna Shpyneva	Ski jumping	Girls' individual normal hill	19 January
Gold	Anastasiia Tsyganova	Skeleton	Girls'	19 January
Gold	Diana Loginova; Pavel Repilov; Mikhail Karnaukhov; Iurii Chirva	Luge	Team relay	20 January
Gold	Iliya Tregubov	Cross-country skiing	Boys' 10 kilometre classical	21 January
Gold	Russia U16 ice hockey team: Danila Byzov; Kirill Dolzhenkov; Artyom Duda; Danil Grigoriev; Mikhail Gulyayev; Sergei Ivanov; Kirill Kudryavtsev; Ilya Kvochko; Vyacheslav Malov; Andrei Malyavin; Matvei Michkov; Ivan Miroshnichenko; Sergei Murashov; Ilya Rogovski; Nikita Ryzhov; Adel Safin; Vladislav Sapunov	Ice hockey	Boys' tournament	22 January
Silver	Diana Mukhametzianova; Ilya Mironov	Figure skating	Pair skating	12 January
Silver	Andrei Mozalev	Figure skating	Boys' singles	12 January
Silver	Sofya Tyutyunina; Alexander Shustitskiy	Figure skating	Ice dancing	13 January
Silver	Pavel Taran	Speed skating	Boys' 1500 metres	13 January
Silver	Ksenia Sinitsyna	Figure skating	Girls' singles	13 January
Silver	Denis Irodov	Biathlon	Boys' sprint	14 January
Silver	Anastasiia Zenova	Biathlon	Girls' sprint	14 January
Silver	Alena Mokhova; Anastasiia Zenova; Denis Irodov; Oleg Domichek	Biathlon	Mixed relay	15 January
Silver	Daria Petrova	Ice hockey	Girls' 3x3 mixed tournament	15 January
Silver	Sofya Tyutyunina; Alexander Shustitskiy	Figure skating	Team trophy	15 January
Silver	Pavel Repilov	Luge	Boys' singles	18 January
Silver	Artem Bazhin	Freestyle skiing	Boys' ski cross	19 January
Silver	Anastasia Privalova; Mariia Erofeeva; Evgeniy Genin; Andrei Gorbachev	Snowboarding	Team ski-snowboard cross	21 January
Silver	Iuliia Beresneva	Short track speed skating	Mixed NOC team relay	22 January
Silver	Nikolai Lysakov	Curling	Mixed doubles	22 January
Bronze	Daniil Samsonov	Figure skating	Boys' singles	12 January
Bronze	Anna Frolova	Figure skating	Girls' singles	13 January
Bronze	Valeriia Sorokoletova	Speed skating	Mixed team sprint	15 January
Bronze	Yana Krasheninina	Ice hockey	Girls' 3x3 mixed tournament	15 January
Bronze	Andrei Mozalev	Figure skating	Team trophy	15 January
Bronze	Pavel Taran	Speed skating	Boys' mass start	16 January
Bronze	Valeriia Denisenko; Mikhail Vlasenko; Alina Fakhurtdinova; Nikolai Lysakov	Curling	Mixed team	16 January
Bronze	Diana Loginova	Luge	Girls' singles	17 January
Bronze	Mikhail Karnaukhov; Iurii Chirva	Luge	Boys' doubles	17 January
Bronze	Vladislava Baliukina	Freestyle skiing	Girls' ski cross	19 January
Bronze	Andrei Gorbachev	Freestyle skiing	Boys' ski cross	19 January

Medals by sport
Sport	1st place, gold medalist(s)	2nd place, silver medalist(s)	3rd place, bronze medalist(s)	Total
Biathlon	3	3	0	6
Figure skating	2	4	2	8
Luge	1	1	2	4
Cross-country skiing	1	0	0	1
Ice hockey	1	0	0	1
Skeleton	1	0	0	1
Ski jumping	1	0	0	1
Freestyle skiing	0	1	2	3
Speed skating	0	1	1	2
Snowboarding	0	1	0	1
Curling	0	0	1	1
Total	10	11	8	29

Medals by date
Day	Date	1st place, gold medalist(s)	2nd place, silver medalist(s)	3rd place, bronze medalist(s)	Total
Day 1	10 January	0	0	0	0
Day 2	11 January	2	0	0	2
Day 3	12 January	1	2	1	4
Day 4	13 January	1	3	1	5
Day 5	14 January	1	2	0	3
Day 6	15 January	0	1	0	1
Day 7	16 January	0	0	2	2
Day 8	17 January	0	0	2	2
Day 9	18 January	0	1	0	1
Day 10	19 January	2	1	2	5
Day 11	20 January	1	0	0	1
Day 12	21 January	1	1	0	2
Day 13	22 January	1	0	0	1
Total		10	11	8	28

== Competitors ==
The following is the list of number of competitors that could participate at the Games per sport/discipline.

Sport	Boys	Girls	Total
Alpine skiing	1	1	2
Biathlon	4	4	8
Bobsleigh	1	1	2
Cross-country	3	3	6
Curling	2	2	4
Figure skating	6	6	12
Freestyle skiing	4	5	9
Ice hockey	21	5	26
Luge	4	4	8
Nordic combined	2	2	4
Short track	2	1	3
Skeleton	2	2	4
Ski jumping	2	2	4
Ski mountaineering	1	1	2
Snowboarding	4	2	6
Speed skating	2	2	4
Total	61	43	104

== Alpine skiing ==
Boys

Athlete	Event	Run 1		Run 2		Total	
Athlete	Event	Time	Rank	Time	Rank	Time	Rank
Roman Zverian	Super-G	—N/a				56.80	29
Roman Zverian	Combined	56.80	29	DNF			
Roman Zverian	Giant slalom	DNF					
Roman Zverian	Slalom	38.73	18	40.80	9	1:19.53	12

Girls

Athlete	Event	Run 1		Run 2		Total	
Athlete	Event	Time	Rank	Time	Rank	Time	Rank
Anastasia Trofimova	Super-G	—N/a				1:01.14	36
Anastasia Trofimova	Combined	1:01.14	36	39.70	16	1:40.84	25
Anastasia Trofimova	Giant slalom	1:09.09	29	1:05.53	19	2:14.62	20
Anastasia Trofimova	Slalom	46.21	8	45.94	14	1:32.15	9

Mixed

Athletes	Event	Round of 16	Quarterfinals	Semifinals	Final / BM	
Athletes	Event	Opposition Score	Opposition Score	Opposition Score	Opposition Score	Rank
Anastasia Trofimova; Roman Zverian	Parallel mixed team	Switzerland; L 1–3	Did not advance			

== Biathlon ==
Boys

Athlete	Event	Time	Misses	Rank
Oleg Domichek	Sprint	21:40.4	5 (3+2)	30
Oleg Domichek	Individual	34:09.4	2 (1+1+0+0)	1st place, gold medalist(s)
Denis Irodov	Sprint	19:36.4	1 (0+1)	2nd place, silver medalist(s)
Denis Irodov	Individual	39:37.4	9 (4+1+3+1)	46
Pavel Lyashok	Sprint	22:18.7	5 (1+4)	43
Pavel Lyashok	Individual	38:13.0	5 (0+2+2+1)	28
Roman Morenkov	Sprint	22:01.3	6 (4+2)	39
Roman Morenkov	Individual	39:03.8	8 (2+2+2+2)	39

Girls

Athlete	Event	Time	Misses	Rank
Alena Mokhova	Sprint	18:55.5	1 (0+1)	1st place, gold medalist(s)
Alena Mokhova	Individual	32:26.7	2 (1+0+0+1)	1st place, gold medalist(s)
Kristina Pavlushina	Sprint	20:44.7	4 (1+3)	37
Kristina Pavlushina	Individual	37:43.9	6 (1+3+0+2)	31
Arina Soldatova	Sprint	20:07.7	1 (0+1)	21
Arina Soldatova	Individual	35:55.7	3 (1+1+1+0)	16
Anastasiia Zenova	Sprint	18:57.4	1 (0+1)	2nd place, silver medalist(s)
Anastasiia Zenova	Individual	38:13.0	8 (4+1+1+2)	38

Mixed

Athletes	Event	Time	Misses	Rank
Alena Mokhova; Oleg Domichek	Single mixed relay	43:13.3	3+14	7
Alena Mokhova; Anastasiia Zenova; Denis Irodov; Oleg Domichek	Mixed relay	1:11:39.0	1+12	2nd place, silver medalist(s)

== Bobsleigh ==
Athlete	Event	Run 1		Run 2		Total	
Athlete	Event	Time	Rank	Time	Rank	Time	Rank
Pavel Zhichkin	Boys'	1:13.82	9	1:12.59	6	2:26.41	5
Elvira Moiseenko	Girls'	1:16.23	16	1:16.38	17	2:32.61	16

== Cross-country skiing ==
Boys

Athlete	Event	Qualification		Quarterfinal		Semifinal		Final	
Athlete	Event	Time	Rank	Time	Rank	Time	Rank	Time	Rank
Alexey Loktinov	10 km classical	—N/a						27:47.3	8
Alexey Loktinov	Sprint freestyle	3:27.83	31	Did not advance					
Alexey Loktinov	Cross-country cross	4:36.16	30 Q	—N/a		4:30.05	8	Did not advance	
Nikita Pisarev	10 km classical	—N/a						28:34.3	20
Nikita Pisarev	Sprint freestyle	3:18.97	8 Q	3:25.34	2 Q	3:17.36	3	Did not advance	
Nikita Pisarev	Cross-country cross	4:24.96	11 Q	—N/a		4:20.78	5	Did not advance	
Iliya Tregubov	10 km classical	—N/a						26:40.5	1st place, gold medalist(s)
Iliya Tregubov	Sprint freestyle	3:15.23	3 Q	3:24.51	1 Q	3:17.87	4	Did not advance	
Iliya Tregubov	Cross-country cross	4:24.09	10 Q	—N/a		4:17.45	2 Q	4:15.66	5

Girls

Athlete	Event	Qualification		Quarterfinal		Semifinal		Final	
Athlete	Event	Time	Rank	Time	Rank	Time	Rank	Time	Rank
Ilyuza Gusmanova	5 km classical	—N/a						15:55.0	30
Ilyuza Gusmanova	Sprint freestyle	2:54.00	21 Q	2:53.44	4	Did not advance			
Ilyuza Gusmanova	Cross-country cross	5:20.19	19 Q	—N/a		5:33.21	10	Did not advance	
Evgeniya Krupitskaya	5 km classical	—N/a						15:21.6	15
Evgeniya Krupitskaya	Sprint freestyle	2:57.46	28 Q	3:07.97	6	Did not advance			
Evgeniya Krupitskaya	Cross-country cross	5:00.96	7 Q	—N/a		4:54.51	2 Q	4:51.58	6
Dariya Nepryaeva	5 km classical	—N/a						15:05.5	11
Dariya Nepryaeva	Sprint freestyle	2:49.51	11 Q	2:52.61	3	Did not advance			
Dariya Nepryaeva	Cross-country cross	5:26.95	32	—N/a		Did not advance			

== Curling ==
Russia qualified a mixed team of four athletes.

Mixed team

Team	Event	Group stage						Quarterfinals	Semifinals	Final / BM	
Team	Event	Opposition Score	Opposition Score	Opposition Score	Opposition Score	Opposition Score	Rank	Opposition Score	Opposition Score	Opposition Score	Rank
Valeriia Denisenko; Mikhail Vlasenko; Alina Fakhurtdinova; Nikolai Lysakov	Mixed team	Canada; L 4–7	South Korea; W 9–2	Spain; W 11–4	Estonia; W 8–4	Poland; W 5–2	2 Q	Switzerland; W 7–5	Norway; L 2–7	New Zealand; W 9–5	3rd place, bronze medalist(s)

Mixed doubles

Athletes	Event	Round of 48	Round of 24	Round of 12	Round of 6	Semifinals	Final / BM	
Athletes	Event	Opposition Result	Opposition Result	Opposition Result	Opposition Result	Opposition Result	Opposition Result	Rank
Valeriia Denisenko (RUS); Eduards Seļiverstovs (LAT)	Mixed doubles	Çalıkuşu (TUR); Park (KOR); W 10–3	Wosińska (POL); Zhang (CHN); L 3–7	Did not advance				
Alina Fakhurtdinova (RUS); Vitor Melo (BRA)	Mixed doubles	Szmidt (POL); Rankin (GBR); L 2–8	Did not advance					
Chana Beitone (FRA); Nikolai Lysakov (RUS)	Mixed doubles	Rajala (CAN); Sever (SLO); W 10–9	Antes (GER); Szarvas (HUN); W 8–2	Lasmane (LAT); Becker (NZL); W 10–5	Wosińska (POL); Zhang (CHN); W 14–4	Pei (CHN); Chabičovský (CZE); W 10–5	Nagy (HUN); Young (CAN); L 5–9	2nd place, silver medalist(s)
Katariina Klammer (EST); Mikhail Vlasenko (RUS)	Mixed doubles	Schwaller (SUI); Tatár (HUN); W 6–4	Bitmete (LAT); Maeda (JPN); L 7–8	Did not advance				

== Figure skating ==
12 Russian figure skaters achieved quota places for Russia based on the results of the 2019 World Junior Figure Skating Championships.

Singles

Athlete	Event	SP		FS		Total	
Athlete	Event	Points	Rank	Points	Rank	Points	Rank
Andrei Mozalev	Boys' singles	79.72	1	158.22	2	237.94	2nd place, silver medalist(s)
Daniil Samsonov	Boys' singles	76.62	2	138.59	3	215.21	3rd place, bronze medalist(s)
Anna Frolova	Girls' singles	69.07	3	118.65	4	187.72	3rd place, bronze medalist(s)
Ksenia Sinitsyna	Girls' singles	71.77	2	128.26	2	200.03	2nd place, silver medalist(s)

Couples

Athletes	Event	SP / RD		FS / FD		Total	
Athletes	Event	Points	Rank	Points	Rank	Points	Rank
Diana Mukhametzianova / Ilya Mironov	Pairs	60.45	2	114.97	2	175.42	2nd place, silver medalist(s)
Apollinariia Panfilova / Dmitry Rylov	Pairs	71.74	1	127.47	1	199.21	1st place, gold medalist(s)
Irina Khavronina / Dario Cirisano	Ice dancing	63.52	1	101.11	1	164.63	1st place, gold medalist(s)
Sofya Tyutyunina / Alexander Shustitskiy	Ice dancing	62.64	2	96.51	2	159.15	2nd place, silver medalist(s)

Mixed NOC team trophy

Athletes	Event	Free skate / Free dance					
Athletes	Event	Ice dance	Pairs	Girls	Boys	Total	
Athletes	Event	Points Team points	Points Team points	Points Team points	Points Team points	Points	Rank
Team Courage; Utana Yoshida / Shingo Nishiyama (JPN); Alina Butaeva / Luka Berulava (GEO); Ksenia Sinitsyna (RUS); Arlet Levandi (EST)	Team trophy	99.21; 8	100.70; 6	127.63; 8	97.63; 2	24	1st place, gold medalist(s)
Team Discovery; Célina Fradji / Jean-Hans Fourneaux (FRA); Apollinariia Panfilova / Dmitry Rylov (RUS); Catherine Carle (CAN); Nikolaj Memola (ITA)	Team trophy	75.86; 2	126.49; 8	91.22; 1	112.27; 4	15	6
Team Focus; Sofya Tyutyunina / Alexander Shustitsky (RUS); Catherine Fleming / Jedidiah Isbell (USA); Kate Wang (USA); Yuma Kagiyama (JPN)	Team trophy	96.39; 7	91.34; 3	101.84; 4	157.62; 8	22	2nd place, silver medalist(s)
Team Future; Anna Cherniavska / Oleg Muratov (UKR); Wang Yuchen / Huang Yihang (CHN); Anna Frolova (RUS); Matteo Nalbone (ITA)	Team trophy	80.86; 3	91.35; 4	126.00; 7	73.89; 1	15	7
Team Motivation; Gina Zehnder / Beda-Leon Sieber (SUI); Diana Mukhametzianova / Ilya Mironov (RUS); Alessia Tornaghi (ITA); Andrey Kokura (UKR)	Team trophy	60.87; 1	101.89; 7	125.22; 6	100.38; 3	17	5
Team Vision; Natalie D'Alessandro / Bruce Waddell (CAN); Sofiia Nesterova / Artem Darenskyi (UKR); Regina Schermann (HUN); Andrei Mozalev (RUS)	Team trophy	89.87; 4	86.53; 2	95.37; 3	154.97; 7	18	3rd place, bronze medalist(s)

== Freestyle skiing ==
Big air / Halfpipe / Slopestyle

Athlete	Event	Qualification				Final				
Athlete	Event	Run 1	Run 2	Best	Rank	Run 1	Run 2	Run 3	Best / Total	Rank
Leonid Frolov	Boys' halfpipe	53.33	53.00	53.33	10 Q	55.66	30.00	51.00	55.66	10
Fedor Muralev	Boys' halfpipe	70.00	61.66	70.00	4 Q	41.33	62.00	67.33	67.33	7
Alina Brezgina	Girls' big air	49.00	54.00	54.00	14	Did not advance				
Alina Brezgina	Girls' slopestyle	35.75	38.00	38.00	13	Did not advance				
Anna Chivina	Girls' big air	58.00	67.33	67.33	7 Q	14.50	50.00	43.75	93.75	9
Anna Chivina	Girls' slopestyle	61.00	46.75	61.00	8 Q	8.50	56.25	10.50	56.25	7
Daria Tatalina	Girls' halfpipe	48.00	53.66	53.66	9	Did not advance				

Ski cross

Athlete	Event	Group heats		Semifinal	Final
Athlete	Event	Points	Rank	Position	Position
Artem Bazhin	Boys' ski cross	18	2 Q	2 Q	2nd place, silver medalist(s)
Andrei Gorbachev	Boys' ski cross	18	3 Q	1 Q	3rd place, bronze medalist(s)
Vladislava Baliukina	Girls' ski cross	19	2 Q	2 Q	3rd place, bronze medalist(s)
Mariia Erofeeva	Girls' ski cross	20	1 Q	2 Q	4

== Ice hockey ==
=== Boys' tournament ===
Roster

- Danila Byzov
- Kirill Dolzhenkov
- Artyom Duda
- Danil Grigoriev
- Mikhail Gulyayev
- Sergei Ivanov
- Kirill Kudryavtsev
- Ilya Kvochko
- Vyacheslav Malov
- Andrei Malyavin
- Matvei Michkov
- Ivan Miroshnichenko
- Sergei Murashov
- Ilya Rogovski
- Nikita Ryzhov
- Adel Safin
- Vladislav Sapunov

Summary

Team	Event	Group stage			Semifinals	Final / BM	
Team	Event	Opposition Score	Opposition Score	Rank	Opposition Score	Opposition Score	Rank
Russia U16 ice hockey team	Boys' tournament	Canada; W 6–2	Denmark; W 9–0	1 Q	Finland; W 10–1	United States; W 4–0	1st place, gold medalist(s)

Preliminary round

Pos	Team	Pld	W	SOW	SOL	L	GF	GA	GD	Pts	Qualification
1	Russia	2	2	0	0	0	15	2	+13	6	Semifinals
2	Canada	2	1	0	0	1	8	6	+2	3	Semifinals
3	Denmark	2	0	0	0	2	0	15	−15	0	

Source: Lausanne2020

18 January 2020; 14:00	Canada	2–6 (0–4, 2–1, 0–1)	Russia	Vaudoise aréna Attendance: 6,500

Game reference

Vincent Filion
Dylan Ernst
Goalies
Sergei Ivanov
Referees:
(United Kingdom) David Good
(Hungary) Zsombor Pálkövi
Linesmen:
(Austria) Sebastian Bedynek
(Slovakia) Juraj Konc

	0–1	06:43 – Michkov (Kvochko, Duda) (PP)
	0–2	08:12 – Gazizov (Miroshnichenko) (SH)
	0–3	11:21 – Michkov (Duda, Miroshnichenko) (PP)
	0–4	12:53 – Malov (Gazizov, Ryzhov)
	0–5	18:28 – Kvochko (Michkov) (PP)
Fantilli (Ludwinski) – 19:35	1–5
Mateychuk (Fimis) – 24:33	2–5
	2–6	43:17 – Malov

19 min
Penalties
4.5 min
17
Shots
22

20 January 2020; 14:00	Russia	9–0 (3–0, 3–0, 3–0)	Denmark	Vaudoise aréna Attendance: 4,300

Game reference

Sergei Murashov
Goalies
Magnus Mortensen
Referees:
(Sweden) Filip Eriksson
(United Kingdom) David Good
Linesmen:
(Austria) Sebastian Bedynek
(Slovakia) Juraj Konc

Miroshnichenko (Michkov, Kudryavtsev) – 00:25	1–0
Michkov (Miroshnichenko, Malyavin) – 03:18	2–0
Miroshnichenko (Michkov, Safin) – 12:36	3–0
Michkov (Rogovski, Duda) (PP2) – 17:30	4–0
Kvochko (Kudryavtsev) – 20:29	5–0
Michkov (Kvochko, Kudryavtsev) – 23:29	6–0
Michkov (Kvochko) – 35:19	7–0
Miroshnichenko (Kudryavtsev) – 39:30	8–0
Dolzhenkov (Safin, Gulyayev) – 44:01	9–0

1.5 min
Penalties
17.5 min
41
Shots
5

Semifinal

21 January 2020; 14:00	Russia	10–1 (3–0, 3–1, 4–0)	Finland	Vaudoise aréna Attendance: 7,700

Game reference

Sergei Ivanov
Sergei Murashov
Goalies
Topias Leinonen
Niklas Kokko
Referees:
(Sweden) Filip Eriksson
(United Kingdom) David Good
Linesmen:
(United States) Shane Gustafson
(Slovakia) Juraj Konc

Rogovski (Kvochko) – 03:48	1–0
Gazizov (Ryzhov, Malov) – 09:06	2–0
Miroshnichenko (SH) – 14:17	3–0
Michkov (Kvochko) (PP) – 15:45	4–0
	4–1	19:04 – Kemell (Lassila, Kulonummi)
Kvochko (Dolzhenkov, Miroshnichenko) – 21:41	5–1
Miroshnichenko (Kvochko) – 26:48	6–1
Miroshnichenko – 30:11	7–1
Gazizov (Michkov, Kvochko) (PP) – 34:42	8–1
Sapunov (Dolzhenkov, Grigoriev) (PP) – 37:59	9–1
Rogovski (Dolzhenkov) (PP) – 39:21	10–1

17.5 min
Penalties
39.5 min
40
Shots
21

Final

22 January 2020; 15:00	(gold) Russia	4–0 (2–0, 1–0, 1–0)	United States (silver)	Vaudoise aréna Attendance: 8,600

Game reference

Sergei Ivanov
Goalies
Dylan Silverstein
Referees:
(Czech Republic) Jan Jaroš
(Hungary) Zsombor Pálkövi
Linesmen:
(Austria) Sebastian Bedynek
(Switzerland) Eric Cattaneo

Michkov (Kvochko, Miroshnichenko) (PP) – 01:59	1–0
Michkov (Miroshnichenko) – 14:27	2–0
Gazizov (Michkov, Duda) (PP) – 21:46	3–0
Malov (Safin, Grigoriev) – 35:13	4–0

1.5 min
Penalties
9 min
26
Shots
15

=== Boys' 3x3 mixed tournament ===
Athlete	Team	Event	Group stage								Semifinals	Final / BM	
Athlete	Team	Event	Opposition Score	Opposition Score	Opposition Score	Opposition Score	Opposition Score	Opposition Score	Opposition Score	Rank	Opposition Score	Opposition Score	Rank
Timofei Katkov	Team Grey	Boys' 3x3 mixed tournament	Team Blue; W 9–8	Team Yellow; W 11–8	Team Brown; L 6–16	Team Red; W 13–9	Team Green; L 6–14	Team Black; L 8–16	Team Orange; W 5–2	5	Did not advance		
Yaroslav Labutkin	Team Black	Boys' 3x3 mixed tournament	Team Brown; L 11–13	Team Red; L 9–12	Team Blue; W 14–8	Team Yellow; W 19–7	Team Orange; L 8–14	Team Grey; W 16–8	Team Green; W 6–4	4 Q	Team Green; L 3–7	Team Brown; L 5–6	4
Ivan Novozhilov	Team Orange	Boys' 3x3 mixed tournament	Team Red; W 8–6	Team Blue; W 12–1	Team Yellow; L 4–9	Team Brown; L 10–14	Team Black; W 14–8	Team Green; L 6–8	Team Grey; L 2–5	6	Did not advance		
Artyom Pronichkin	Team Green	Boys' 3x3 mixed tournament	Team Yellow; W 10–5	Team Brown; W 8–6	Team Red; W 9–8 (GWS)	Team Blue; W 11–6	Team Grey; W 14–6	Team Orange; W 8–6	Team Black; L 4–6	1 Q	Team Black; W 7–3	Team Red; W 10–4	1st place, gold medalist(s)

=== Girls' 3x3 mixed tournament ===
Athlete	Team	Event	Group stage								Semifinals	Final / BM	
Athlete	Team	Event	Opposition Score	Opposition Score	Opposition Score	Opposition Score	Opposition Score	Opposition Score	Opposition Score	Rank	Opposition Score	Opposition Score	Rank
Yekaterina Davletshina	Team Grey	Girls' 3x3 mixed tournament	Team Blue; L 7–9	Team Yellow; L 5–11	Team Brown; W 9–7	Team Red; W 8–5	Team Green; L 4–9	Team Black; L 3–5	Team Orange; W 8–6	6	Did not advance		
Alina Ichayeva	Team Red	Girls' 3x3 mixed tournament	Team Orange; L 4–6	Team Black; L 4–5	Team Green; L 7–9	Team Grey; L 5–8	Team Brown; W 11–7	Team Yellow; W 8–5	Team Blue; W 5–4 (GWS)	7	Did not advance		
Yana Krasheninina	Team Blue	Girls' 3x3 mixed tournament	Team Grey; W 9–7	Team Orange; W 7–4	Team Black; W 8–4	Team Green; W 5–3	Team Yellow; L 5–8	Team Brown; W 5–4 (GWS)	Team Red; L 4–5 (GWS)	2 Q	Team Yellow; L 5–7	Team Brown; W 6–4	3rd place, bronze medalist(s)
Daria Petrova	Team Black	Girls' 3x3 mixed tournament	Team Brown; W 7–6	Team Red; W 5–4	Team Blue; L 4–8	Team Yellow; W 7–2	Team Orange; W 7–3	Team Grey; W 5–3	Team Green; W 9–4	1 Q	Team Brown; W 11–7	Team Yellow; L 1–6	2nd place, silver medalist(s)
Yulia Volkova	Team Orange	Girls' 3x3 mixed tournament	Team Red; W 6–4	Team Blue; L 4–7	Team Yellow; L 3–8	Team Brown; L 4–10	Team Black; L 3–7	Team Green; L 6–7	Team Grey; L 6–8	8	Did not advance		

== Luge ==
Boys

Athlete	Event	Run 1		Run 2		Total	
Athlete	Event	Time	Rank	Time	Rank	Time	Rank
Sergei Bondarev	Singles	54.992	10	54.935	9	1:49.927	10
Pavel Repilov	Singles	54.175	2	54.054	2	1:48.229	2nd place, silver medalist(s)
Iurii Chirva; Mikhail Karnaukhov	Doubles	55.698	6	54.627	1	1:50.325	3rd place, bronze medalist(s)

Girls

Athlete	Event	Run 1		Run 2		Total	
Athlete	Event	Time	Rank	Time	Rank	Time	Rank
Diana Loginova	Singles	55.155	2	54.811	3	1:49.966	3rd place, bronze medalist(s)
Elizaveta Yurchenko	Singles	55.566	6	55.441	9	1:51.007	9
Viktoriia Chirkova; Natalia Korotaeva	Doubles	56.087	2	58.292	10	1:54.379	6

Mixed team relay

Athlete	Event	Girls		Boys		Doubles		Total	
Athlete	Event	Time	Rank	Time	Rank	Time	Rank	Time	Rank
Diana Loginova; Pavel Repilov; Mikhail Karnaukhov / Iurii Chirva	Team relay	56.632	2	58.266	2	59.174	1	2:54.072	1st place, gold medalist(s)

== Nordic combined ==
Individual

Athlete	Event	Ski jumping				Cross-country	
Athlete	Event	Distance	Points	Rank	Deficit	Time	Rank
Kirill Averianov	Boys' normal hill/6 km	81.0	94.6	23	1:44	18:15.1	24
Vladimir Malov	Boys' normal hill/6 km	DSQ					
Diana Fedorova	Girls' normal hill/4 km	63.5	73.4	21	2:40	14:47.2	17
Aleksandra Tikhonovich	Girls' normal hill/4 km	70.0	83.5	17	2:09	14:40.8	16

Nordic mixed team

Athlete	Event	Ski jumping			Cross-country	
Athlete	Event	Points	Rank	Deficit	Time	Rank
Aleksandra Tikhonovich; Vladimir Malov; Anna Shpyneva; Danil Sadreev; Evgeniya Krupitskaya; Iliya Tregubov	Nordic mixed team	375.8	8	2:26	31:00.9	9

== Short track speed skating ==
Three Russian skaters achieved quota places for Russia based on the results of the 2019 World Junior Short Track Speed Skating Championships.

Boys

Athlete	Event	Heats		Quarterfinal		Semifinal		Final	
Athlete	Event	Time	Rank	Time	Rank	Time	Rank	Time	Rank
Vladimir Balbekov	500 m	41.828	1 Q	41.357	1 Q	41.399	1 QA	56.847	4
Vladimir Balbekov	1000 m	1:29.692	1 Q	1:31.256	1 Q	1:45.319	3 QB	1:36.157	5
Daniil Nikolaev	500 m	41.820	2 Q	41.334	2 Q	41.613	3 QB	42.266	5
Daniil Nikolaev	1000 m	1:32.620	1 Q	1:31.496	2 Q	1:45.468	4 QB	1:36.555	6

Girls

Athlete	Event	Heats		Quarterfinal		Semifinal		Final	
Athlete	Event	Time	Rank	Time	Rank	Time	Rank	Time	Rank
Iuliia Beresneva	500 m	45.819	2 Q	DNF		Did not advance			
Iuliia Beresneva	1000 m	1:45.050	1 Q	1:39.625	1 Q	1:34.346	2 QA	1:30.115	4

Mixed team relay

Athlete	Event	Semifinal		Final	
Athlete	Event	Time	Rank	Time	Rank
Team C Florence Brunelle (CAN); Anna Ruysschaert (LUX); Kosei Hayashi (JPN); Daniil Nikolaev (RUS)	Mixed team relay	4:15.601	3 QB	4:16.893	6
Team F Barbara Somogyi (HUN); Elisa Confortola (ITA); Félix Pigeon (CAN); Vladimir Balbekov (RUS)	Mixed team relay	4:11.169	2 QA	4:22.471	4
Team G Iuliia Beresneva (RUS); Chang Hui (TPE); Jang Sung-woo (KOR); Gabriel Volet (FRA)	Mixed team relay	4:11.042	1 QA	4:12.972	2nd place, silver medalist(s)

== Skeleton ==
Athlete	Event	Run 1		Run 2		Total	
Athlete	Event	Time	Rank	Time	Rank	Time	Rank
Dmitrii Grevtsev	Boys	1:10.27	4	1:10.25	6	2:20.52	6
Dmitry Knysh	Boys	1:11.72	15	1:11.05	14	2:22.77	13
Polina Tiurina	Girls	1:12.27	7	1:12.11	8	2:24.38	8
Anastasiia Tsyganova	Girls	1:11.09	2	1:11.41	1	2:22.50	1st place, gold medalist(s)

== Ski jumping ==
Individual

Athlete	Event	First round			Final round			Total	
Athlete	Event	Distance	Points	Rank	Distance	Points	Rank	Points	Rank
Ilya Mankov	Boys' normal hill	89.0	118.7	5	85.0	117.8	6	236.5	5
Danil Sadreev	Boys' normal hill	87.0	122.1	3	85.5	121.3	4	243.4	4
Alina Borodina	Girls' normal hill	75.0	94.5	16	69.0	76.9	19	171.4	18
Anna Shpyneva	Girls' normal hill	85.0	119.8	2	84.0	109.8	1	229.6	1st place, gold medalist(s)

Team

Athlete	Event	First round		Final round		Total	
Athlete	Event	Points	Rank	Points	Rank	Points	Rank
Aleksandra Tikhonovich; Vladimir Malov; Anna Shpyneva; Danil Sadreev	Mixed team	447.3	3	433.1	5	880.4	4

== Ski mountaineering ==
Individual

Athlete	Event	Final	
Athlete	Event	Tme	Rank
Nikita Philippov	Boys' individual	53:16.09	11
Evgeniia Dolzhenkova	Girls' individual	1:08:00.63	14

Sprint

Athlete	Event	Seeding		Quarterfinal		Semifinal		Final	
Athlete	Event	Time	Rank	Time	Rank	Time	Rank	Time	Rank
Nikita Philippov	Boys' sprint	3:21.27	23	2:51.56	3 Q	2:44.73	2 Q	7:44.72	6
Evgeniia Dolzhenkova	Girls' sprint	3:59.17	16	4:05.30	5	Did not advance			

Mixed team relay

Athlete	Event	Final	
Athlete	Event	Tme	Rank
Europe; Evgeniia Dolzhenkova (RUS); Matúš Černek (SVK); Laura Kovárová (SVK); Nikita Philippov (RUS)	Mixed relay	40:56	9

== Snowboarding ==
Big air / Halfpipe / Slopestyle

Athlete	Event	Qualification				Final				
Athlete	Event	Run 1	Run 2	Best	Rank	Run 1	Run 2	Run 3	Best / Total	Rank
Nikita Abozovik	Boys' halfpipe	55.66	28.33	55.66	11	Did not advance				
Yaroslav Lenchevskiy	Boys' big air	78.75	22.75	78.75	6 Q	14.25	32.75	68.25	101.00	7
Yaroslav Lenchevskiy	Boys' halfpipe	60.00	63.00	63.00	10 Q	60.00	63.33	57.00	63.33	9
Yaroslav Lenchevskiy	Boys' slopestyle	24.33	11.33	24.33	16	Did not advance				

Snowboard cross

Athlete	Event	Group heats		Semifinal	Final
Athlete	Event	Points	Rank	Position	Position
Evgeniy Genin	Boys' snowboard cross	14	6	Did not advance	
Arseniy Tomin	Boys' snowboard cross	9	13	Did not advance	
Ekaterina Lokteva-Zagorskaia	Girls' snowboard cross	16	5	Did not advance	
Anastasia Privalova	Girls' snowboard cross	19	2 Q	2 Q	4

Snowboard and ski cross relay

Athlete	Event	Pre-heat	Quarterfinal	Semifinal	Final
Athlete	Event	Position	Position	Position	Position
Anastasia Privalova; Mariia Erofeeva; Evgeniy Genin; Andrei Gorbachev	Team ski-snowboard cross	Bye	2 Q	2 Q	2nd place, silver medalist(s)
Mixed Team 3 Ekaterina Lokteva-Zagorskaia (RUS); Maria Shcherbakovskaya (ISR); Noa Coutton-Jean (FRA); Artem Bazhin (RUS)	Team ski-snowboard cross	1 Q	1 Q	2 Q	4
Mixed Team 10; Tanja Kobald (AUT); Vladislava Baliukina (RUS); Elias Leitner (AUT); Christoph Danksagmüller (AUT)	Team ski-snowboard cross	3	Did not advance		

== Speed skating ==
Three Russian skaters achieved quota places for Russia based on the results of the 2019 World Junior Speed Skating Championships.

Boys

Athlete	Event	Final	
Athlete	Event	Time	Rank
Alexander Sergeev	500 m	38.03	9
Alexander Sergeev	1500 m	2:00.26	14
Pavel Taran	500 m	38.17	11
Pavel Taran	1500 m	1:53.74	2nd place, silver medalist(s)

Athlete	Event	Semifinal			Final		
Athlete	Event	Points	Time	Rank	Points	Time	Rank
Alexander Sergeev	Mass start	10	5:54.08	3 Q	0	6:33.87	13
Pavel Taran	Mass start	2	6:33.58	7 Q	10	6:30.41	3rd place, bronze medalist(s)

Girls

Athlete	Event	Final	
Athlete	Event	Time	Rank
Aleksandra Rutkovskaia	500 m	42.57	12
Aleksandra Rutkovskaia	1500 m	2:13.41	5
Valeriia Sorokoletova	500 m	42.98	14
Valeriia Sorokoletova	1500 m	2:17.059	10

Athlete	Event	Semifinal			Final		
Athlete	Event	Points	Time	Rank	Points	Time	Rank
Aleksandra Rutkovskaia	Mass start	3	6:51.12	3 Q	2	6:57.74	7
Valeriia Sorokoletova	Mass start	0	6:15.93	10	Did not advance		

Mixed team sprint

Athletes	Event	Final	
Athletes	Event	Time	Rank
Team 3 Sini Siro (FIN); Yukino Yoshida (JPN); Ignaz Gschwentner (AUT); Alexander Sergeev (RUS)	Mixed team sprint	2:04.10	1st place, gold medalist(s)
Team 12; Katia Filippi (ITA); Aleksandra Rutkovskaia (RUS); Eetu Käsnänen (FIN); Remo Slotegraaf (NED)	Mixed team sprint	2:10.07	12
Team 14; Ramona Ionel (ROU); Valeriia Sorokoletova (RUS); Tuukka Suomalainen (FIN); Jonathan Tobon (USA)	Mixed team sprint	2:05.96	3rd place, bronze medalist(s)
Team 15; Hanna Bíró (HUN); Kang Soo-min (KOR); Yevgeniy Koshkin (KAZ); Pavel Taran (RUS)	Mixed team sprint	2:07.27	6

== See also ==
- Russian Olympic Committee athletes at the 2020 Summer Olympics
