= Nikita Filippov =

Nikita Filippov may refer to:

- Nikita Filippov (pole vaulter) (born 1991), Kazakh pole vaulter
- Nikita Filippov (ski mountaineer) (born 2002), Russian ski mountaineer
