= Freestyle skiing at the 2020 Winter Youth Olympics =

Freestyle skiing at the III Winter Youth Olympic Games
- Venue: Leysin and Villars, Switzerland
- Dates: 18–22 January
- Competitors: 114 from 28 nations

Freestyle skiing at the 2020 Winter Youth Olympics took place in Leysin and Villars, Switzerland.

== Events ==
=== Medal table ===
* Host nation (Switzerland)

Rank	Nation	Gold	Silver	Bronze	Total
1	China	2	2	0	4
2	United States	1	2	2	5
3	Sweden	1	1	2	4
4	Czech Republic	1	1	0	2
5	Canada	1	0	0	1
5	Estonia	1	0	0	1
5	Switzerland*	1	0	0	1
8	Russia	0	1	2	3
9	Great Britain	0	1	0	1
10	New Zealand	0	0	1	1
10	Ukraine	0	0	1	1
Totals (11 entries)		8	8	8	24

=== Boys' events ===
Event	Gold		Silver		Bronze	
Boys' big air	Matěj Švancer; Czech Republic	186.00	Kiernan Fagan; United States	183.00	Orest Kovalenko; Ukraine	179.50
Boys' halfpipe	Andrew Longino; Canada	94.00	Hunter Carey; United States	86.00	Luca Harrington; New Zealand	80.66
Boys' slopestyle	Kiernan Fagan; United States	90.66	Melvin Morén; Sweden	89.33	Hunter Henderson; United States	88.66
Boys' ski cross	Erik Wahlberg; Sweden		Artem Bazhin; Russia		Andrei Gorbachev; Russia	

=== Girls' events ===
Event	Gold		Silver		Bronze	
Girls' big air	Gu Ailing; China	171.25	Kirsty Muir; Great Britain	170.00	Jennie-Lee Burmansson; Sweden	151.75
Girls' halfpipe	Gu Ailing; China	93.00	Li Fanghui; China	85.66	Hanna Faulhaber; United States	77.33
Girls' slopestyle	Kelly Sildaru; Estonia	93.75	Gu Ailing; China	93.25	Jennie-Lee Burmansson; Sweden	90.00
Girls' ski cross	Marie Krista; Switzerland		Diana Cholenská; Czech Republic		Vladislava Baliukina; Russia	

== Qualification ==
=== Summary ===
NOC	Boys'				Girls'				Total
NOC	Ski cross	Halfpipe	Big Air	Slopestyle	Ski cross	Halfpipe	Big Air	Slopestyle	Total
Australia	2				2	2	2	2	6
Austria	2		1	1	1				4
Belgium					1				1
Canada	2	2	3	3	2	2	2	2	10
Chile					1		1	1	2
China	2	2			2	3	2	2	10
Czech Republic	2		2	2	2				6
Estonia								1	1
Finland			1	1					1
France	1		1	1	1		2	2	5
Germany	2		1	1	1				4
Great Britain	1		1	1			1	1	3
Greece	1								1
Hungary	1								1
Israel					1				1
Italy	2								2
Japan			1	1		2		1	3
Kazakhstan					1				1
New Zealand		2	3	3		1	1	1	4
Norway	1		2	2	1				4
Russia	2	2			2	1	2	2	9
Slovakia	1				1				2
Slovenia			2	2	1				3
South Korea		2							2
Switzerland	2	2	3	3	2	1	3	2	10
Sweden	2		2	2	2		2	2	8
Ukraine			1	1					1
United States	1	3	2	2		3	3	2	9
Total: 28 NOCs	27	15	26	26	24	15	21	21	114
