= Figure skating at the 2020 Winter Youth Olympics – Boys' singles =

Boys' singles at the III Winter Youth Olympic Games
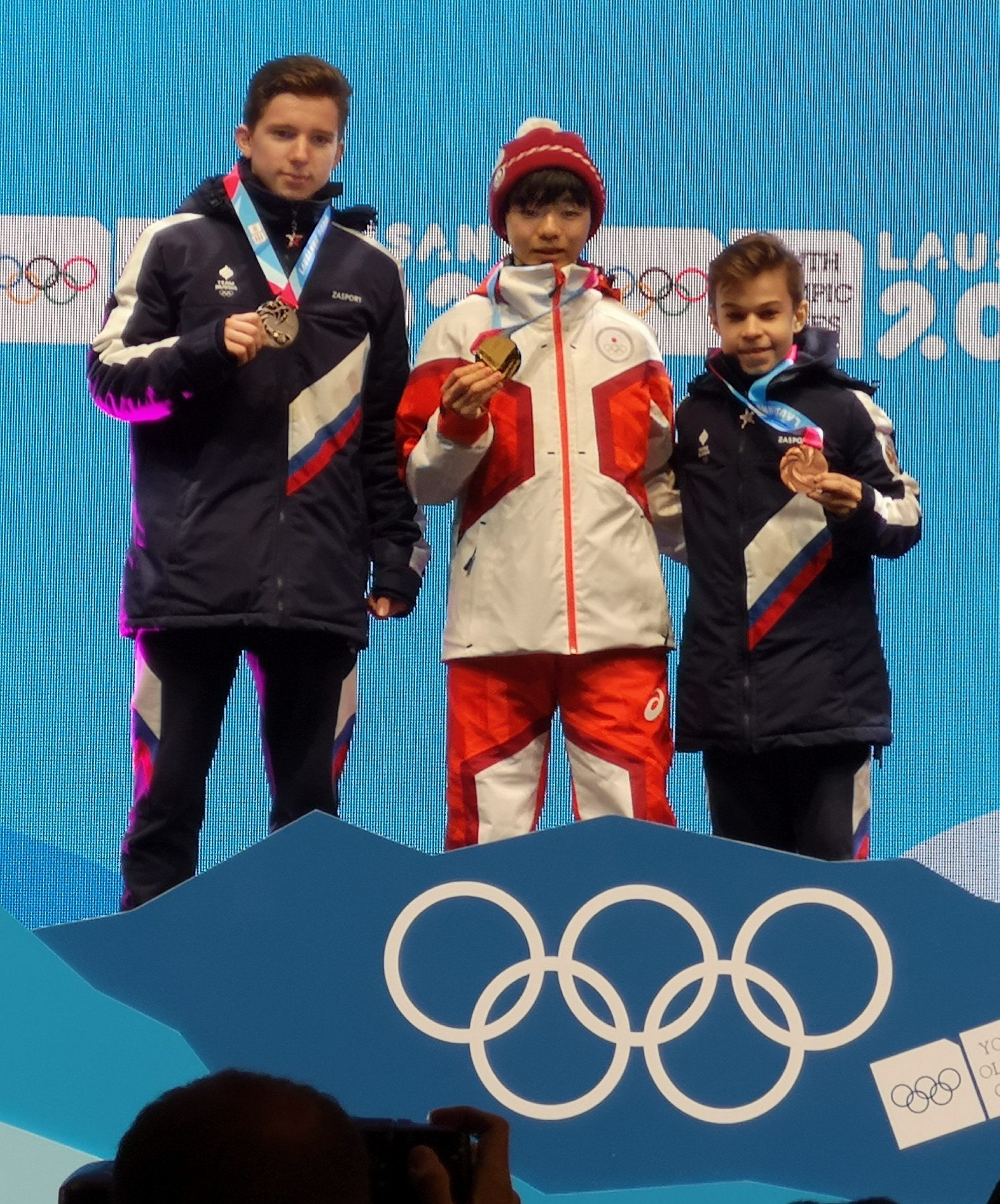
- Venue: Lausanne Skating Arena
- Dates: 10, 12 January
- Competitors: 15 from 13 nations
- Winning score: 239.17

Medalists
1st place, gold medalist(s)		Yuma Kagiyama	Japan
2nd place, silver medalist(s)		Andrei Mozalev	Russia
3rd place, bronze medalist(s)		Daniil Samsonov	Russia

The boys' singles competition of the 2020 Winter Youth Olympics was held at the Lausanne Skating Arena on 10 January (short program) and 12 January 2020 (free skating).

== Results ==
=== Short program ===
The short program was held on 10 January at 16:00.

Pl.	Name	Nation	TSS	TES	PCS	SS	TR	PE	CH	IN	Ded	StN
1	Andrei Mozalev	Russia	79.72	42.14	37.58	7.43	7.54	7.54	7.57	7.50	0.00	14
2	Daniil Samsonov	Russia	76.62	38.98	38.64	7.68	7.82	7.57	7.86	7.71	-1.00	13
3	Yuma Kagiyama	Japan	72.76	36.92	36.84	7.71	7.21	7.21	7.39	7.32	-1.00	11
4	Aleksa Rakic	Canada	70.96	36.89	34.07	6.79	6.71	6.82	6.96	6.79	0.00	12
5	Cha Young-hyun	South Korea	69.61	35.51	34.10	6.96	6.68	6.96	6.75	6.75	0.00	15
6	Andrey Kokura	Ukraine	62.48	34.01	28.47	5.75	5.11	5.89	5.79	5.93	0.00	6
7	Nikolaj Memola	Italy	62.18	31.97	30.21	5.96	5.86	6.14	6.11	6.14	0.00	7
8	Daniel Mrázek	Czech Republic	60.66	30.63	31.03	6.07	6.11	6.14	6.32	6.39	-1.00	10
9	Noah Bodenstein	Switzerland	60.56	31.24	29.32	5.68	5.57	5.96	6.11	6.00	0.00	3
10	Chen Yudong	China	57.31	28.13	30.18	6.29	5.82	5.86	6.21	6.00	-1.00	9
11	François Pitot	France	53.02	26.23	27.79	5.68	5.14	5.61	5.68	5.68	-1.00	4
12	Matteo Nalbone	Italy	53.01	27.80	25.21	5.25	4.96	4.93	5.21	4.86	0.00	1
13	Arlet Levandi	Estonia	49.87	22.51	28.36	5.68	5.54	5.57	5.75	5.82	-1.00	5
14	Liam Kapeikis	United States	49.57	20.39	30.18	6.04	6.07	5.68	6.25	6.14	-1.00	2
15	Nikita Kovalenko	Israel	44.71	18.42	27.29	5.54	5.32	5.25	5.64	5.54	-1.00	8

=== Free skating ===
The free skating was held on 12 January at 14:00.

Pl.	Name	Nation	TSS	TES	PCS	SS	TR	PE	CH	IN	Ded	StN
1	Yuma Kagiyama	Japan	166.41	86.93	79.48	8.25	7.64	8.14	7.89	7.82	0.00	15
2	Andrei Mozalev	Russia	158.22	82.28	76.94	7.75	7.64	7.68	7.79	7.61	1.00	14
3	Daniil Samsonov	Russia	138.59	64.15	75.44	7.68	7.54	7.39	7.68	7.43	1.00	13
4	Aleksa Rakic	Canada	134.27	65.39	68.88	6.82	6.93	6.93	7.04	6.79	0.00	11
5	Cha Young-hyun	South Korea	129.51	59.79	69.72	6.96	6.68	7.04	7.04	7.14	0.00	12
6	Chen Yudong	China	127.29	63.29	64.00	6.61	6.07	6.64	6.39	6.29	0.00	6
7	Noah Bodenstein	Switzerland	116.36	59.06	57.30	5.86	5.46	5.79	5.86	5.68	0.00	7
8	Nikolaj Memola	Italy	114.37	55.95	59.66	5.96	5.79	6.04	6.04	6.00	1.00	10
9	Liam Kapeikis	United States	112.02	54.66	57.36	5.86	5.64	5.61	5.89	5.68	0.00	3
10	Andrey Kokura	Ukraine	109.20	50.84	58.36	6.04	5.57	5.86	5.82	5.89	0.00	8
11	Arlet Levandi	Estonia	104.78	50.80	104.78	5.57	4.96	5.46	5.43	5.57	0.00	1
12	François Pitot	France	101.02	48.58	52.44	5.54	5.00	5.25	5.25	5.18	0.00	5
13	Daniel Mrázek	Czech Republic	96.32	40.90	58.42	6.07	5.82	5.57	5.93	5.82	3.00	9
14	Matteo Nalbone	Italy	91.63	41.53	50.10	5.18	4.86	5.04	5.11	4.86	0.00	4
15	Nikita Kovalenko	Israel	87.41	34.53	52.88	5.43	5.04	5.18	5.43	5.36	0.00	2

=== Overall ===
Rank	Name	Nation	Total points	SP		FS	
1	Yuma Kagiyama	Japan	239.17	3	72.76	1	166.41
2	Andrei Mozalev	Russia	237.94	1	79.72	2	158.22
3	Daniil Samsonov	Russia	215.21	2	76.62	3	138.59
4	Aleksa Rakic	Canada	205.23	4	70.96	4	134.27
5	Cha Young-hyun	South Korea	199.12	5	69.61	5	129.51
6	Chen Yudong	China	184.60	10	57.31	6	127.29
7	Noah Bodenstein	Switzerland	176.92	9	60.56	7	116.36
8	Nikolaj Memola	Italy	176.55	7	62.18	8	114.37
9	Andrey Kokura	Ukraine	171.68	6	62.48	10	109.20
10	Liam Kapeikis	United States	161.59	14	49.57	9	112.02
11	Daniel Mrázek	Czech Republic	156.98	8	60.66	13	96.32
12	Arlet Levandi	Estonia	154.65	13	49.87	11	104.78
13	François Pitot	France	154.04	11	53.02	12	101.02
14	Matteo Nalbone	Italy	144.64	12	53.01	14	91.63
15	Nikita Kovalenko	Israel	132.12	15	44.71	15	87.41
