= Mikhail Gulyayev =

Russian ice hockey player (born 2005)

- Born: 26 April 2005 (age 21) Novosibirsk, Russia
- Height: 5 ft 10 in (178 cm)
- Weight: 172 lb (78 kg; 12 st 4 lb)
- Position: Defence
- Shoots: Left
- KHL team: Avangard Omsk
- NHL draft: 31st overall, 2023; Colorado Avalanche
- Playing career: 2022–present

Mikhail Gulyayev (born 26 April 2005) is a Russian professional ice hockey player for Avangard Omsk of the Kontinental Hockey League (KHL). He was drafted 31st overall by the Colorado Avalanche in the 2023 NHL entry draft.

== Playing career ==
During the 2022–23 season, Gulyayev split time in the MHL, VHL and KHL. He made his professional debut for Avangard Omsk where he recorded one assist in 13 games.

Following the completion of his fourth KHL year in the 2025–26 season, Gulyayev opted to continue his tenure with Avangard in signing a two-year contract extension on 29 May 2026.

== International play ==
Medal record

Representing Russia

Ice hockey

Winter Youth Olympics
Gold medal – first place	2020 Lausanne	

Gulyayev represented Russia at the 2020 Winter Youth Olympics where he recorded one assist in four games and won a gold medal.

== Career statistics ==
			Regular season					Playoffs
Season	Team	League	GP	G	A	Pts	PIM	GP	G	A	Pts	PIM
2021–22	Omskie Yastreby	MHL	54	7	28	35	24	13	0	5	5	4
2022–23	Omskie Yastreby	MHL	22	2	23	25	18	17	2	8	10	2
2022–23	Omskie Krylia	VHL	12	0	4	4	4	—	—	—	—	—
2022–23	Avangard Omsk	KHL	13	0	1	1	6	—	—	—	—	—
2023–24	Avangard Omsk	KHL	64	4	8	12	8	12	2	1	3	2
2024–25	Avangard Omsk	KHL	67	7	8	15	8	13	1	2	3	2
2024–25	Omskie Yastreby	MHL	—	—	—	—	—	4	0	3	3	2
2025–26	Avangard Omsk	KHL	54	1	2	3	14	17	1	4	5	2
KHL totals			198	12	19	31	36	42	4	7	11	6

Awards and achievements
Preceded by Calum Ritchie	Colorado Avalanche first-round draft pick 2023	Succeeded by Incumbent
