= Snowboarding at the 2020 Winter Youth Olympics – Team ski-snowboard cross =

Team ski-snowboard cross at the III Winter Youth Olympic Games
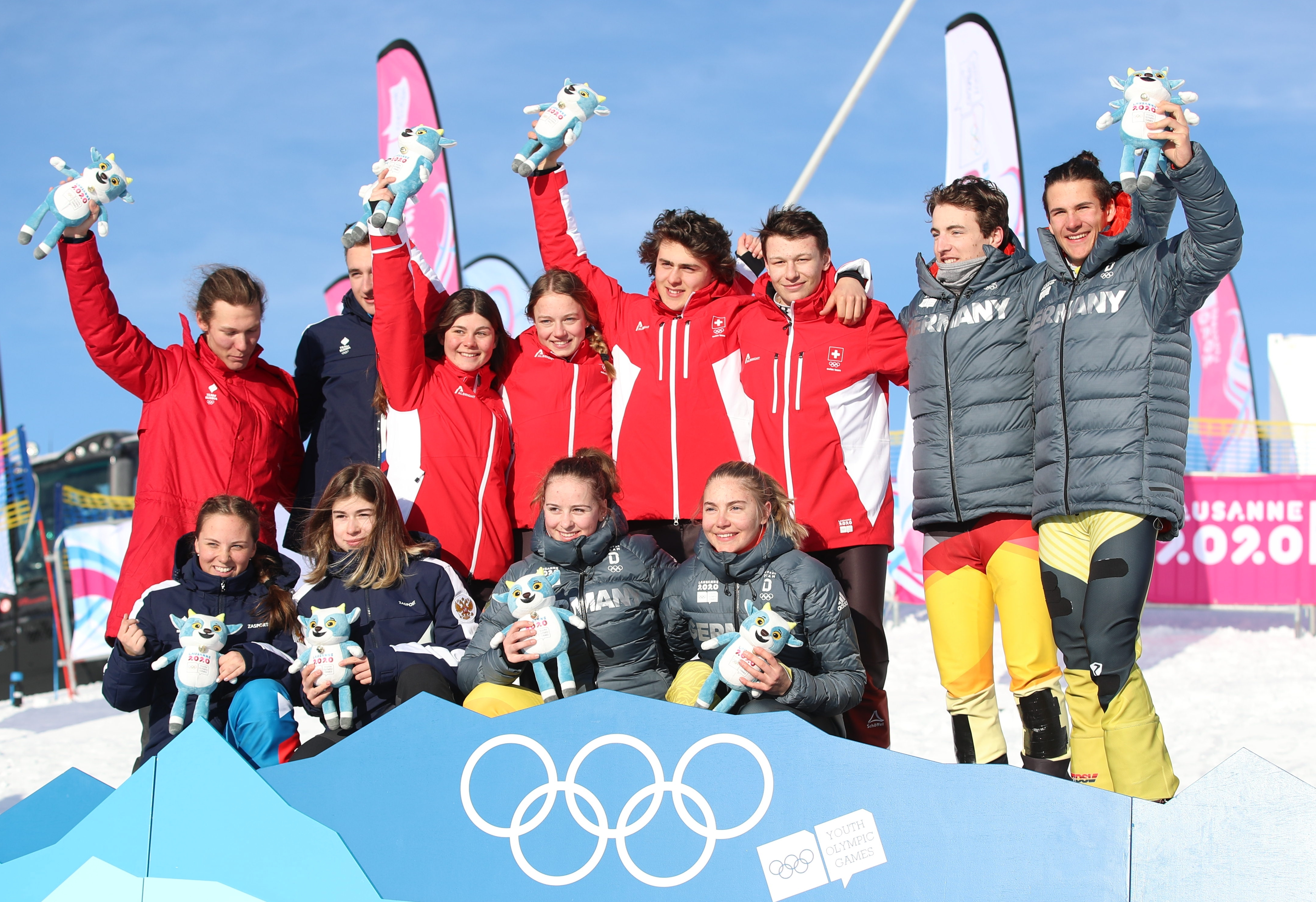
- Venue: Villars Winter Park
- Dates: 21 January
- Competitors: 76 from 25 nations
- Teams: 19

Medalists
1st place, gold medalist(s)		Anouk Dörig; Marie Krista; Valerio Jud; Robin Tissières	Switzerland
2nd place, silver medalist(s)		Anastasia Privalova; Mariia Erofeeva; Evgeniy Genin; Andrei Gorbachev	Russia
3rd place, bronze medalist(s)		Lilith Kuhnert; Nina Walderbach; Niels Conradt; Sebastian Veit	Germany

The team ski-snowboard cross event at the 2020 Winter Youth Olympics took place on 21 January at the Villars Winter Park.

== Participants ==
Start order: Female snowboarder, female skier, male snowboarder, male skier.

Seed	Team	Seed	Team
1	Australia; Josie Baff; Kyra Wheatley; Finn Sadler; Ben Wynn	11	Mixed Team 5 Amber Essex (AUS); Zoe Michael (AUS); Noah Bethonico (BRA); Jasper Cobcroft (AUS)
2	France; Margaux Herpin; Léa Hudry; Quentin Sodogas; Tom Barnoin	12	Germany; Lilith Kuhnert; Nina Walderbach; Niels Conradt; Sebastian Veit
3	Switzerland; Anouk Dörig; Marie Krista; Valerio Jud; Robin Tissières	13	Mixed Team 6 Aina Gomáriz (ESP); Marie-Pier Brunet (CAN); Álvaro Romero (ESP); Scott Johns (GBR)
4	Mixed Team 1 Chloé Passerat (FRA); Lia Nilsson (SWE); Ivan Malovannyi (UKR); Kilian Himmelsbach (GER)	14	Czech Republic; Sára Strnadová; Diana Cholenská; Matouš Šmerák; Richard Zachoval
5	China; Chai Xin; Ran Hongyun; Gao Dali; Qiu Xiyang	15	Mixed Team 7 Teodora Ilieva (BUL); Josefina Valdés (CHI); Dante Vera (ARG); Oscar Trygg (NOR)
6	Mixed Team 6 Morena Arroyo (ARG); Sage Stefani (CAN); Jacob Walper (CAN); Jack Morrow (CAN)	16	Mixed Team 8 Nima Yongqing (CHN); Su Yue (CHN); Vladi Kambourov (BUL); Hou Haoyi (CHN)
7	Russia; Anastasia Privalova; Mariia Erofeeva; Evgeniy Genin; Andrei Gorbachev	17	Mixed Team 9 Marika Savoldelli (ITA); Noa Spoelders (BEL); Niccolò Colturi (ITA); Jannes Debertol (ITA)
8	Mixed Team 3 Ekaterina Lokteva-Zagorskaia (RUS); Maria Shcherbakovskaya (ISR); Noa Coutton-Jean (FRA); Artem Bazhin (RUS)	18	Mixed Team 10; Tanja Kobald (AUT); Vladislava Baliukina (RUS); Elias Leitner (AUT); Christoph Danksagmüller (AUT)
9	Mixed Team 4 Federica Fantoni (ITA); Alice Fortkord (SWE); Thomas Abegglen (SUI); Thomas Kolly (SUI)	19	Mixed Team 11; Madeline Lochte-Bono (USA); Kayla Anna Lozáková (SVK); Theodore McLemore (USA); Jakub Válek (SVK)
10	Austria; Anna-Maria Galler; Leonie Innerhofer; Felix Powondra; Marcus Plank	20	Mixed Team 12; Zsófia Vincze (HUN); Marta Rihtaršič (SLO); Silviu Popa (ROU); Isbat Hoque (HUN)

== Results ==
Four-team elimination races were held, with the top two from each race advancing.

=== Pre-heats ===
Heat 1

Rank	Bib	Country	Notes
1	17	Mixed Team 9	Q
2	20	Mixed Team 12	Q
3	13	Mixed Team 6	
4	16	Mixed Team 8	

Heat 2

Rank	Bib	Country	Notes
1	14	Czech Republic	Q
2	19	Mixed Team 11	Q
3	18	Mixed Team 10	
4	15	Mixed Team 7	

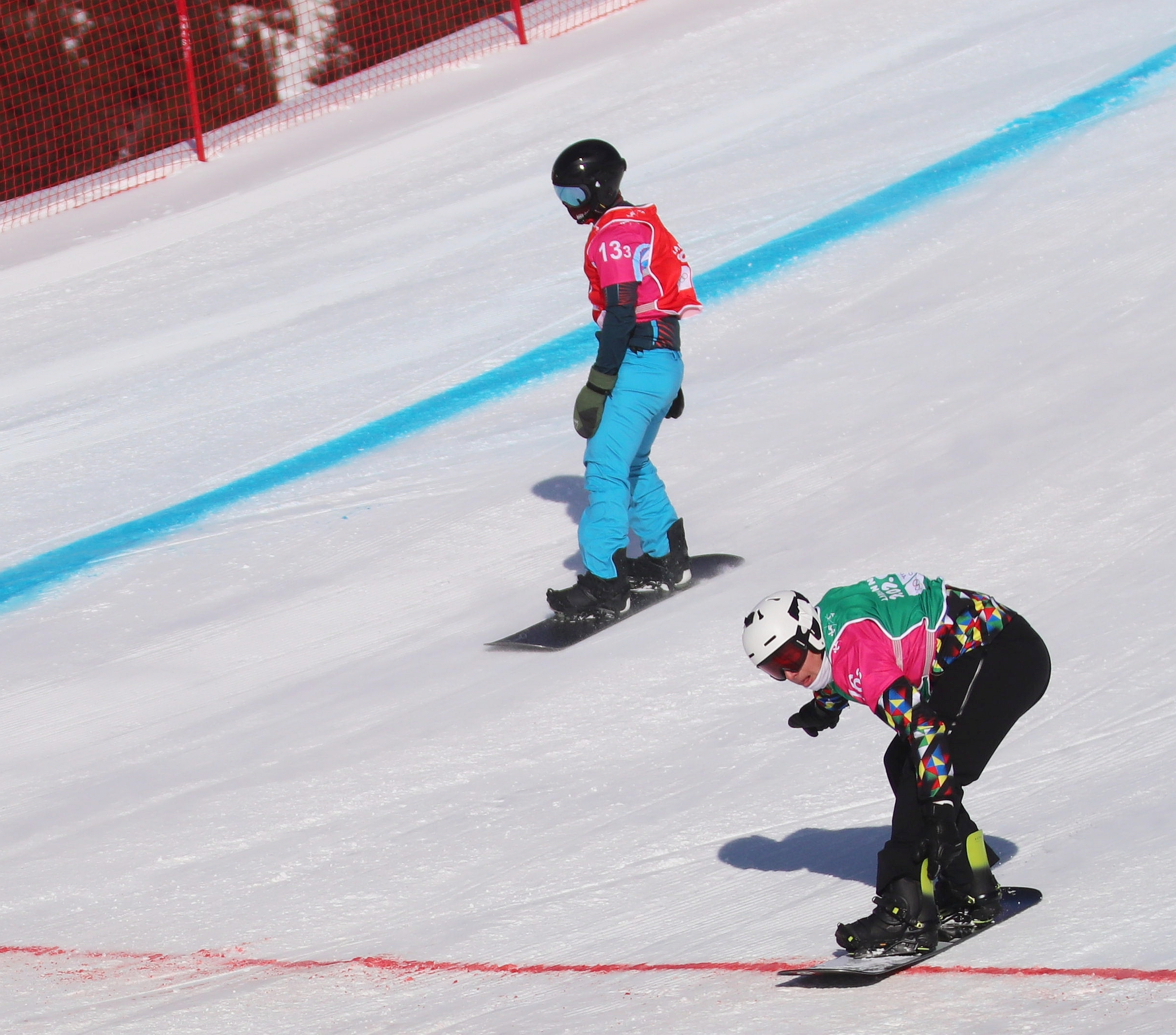
Pre-heat 1

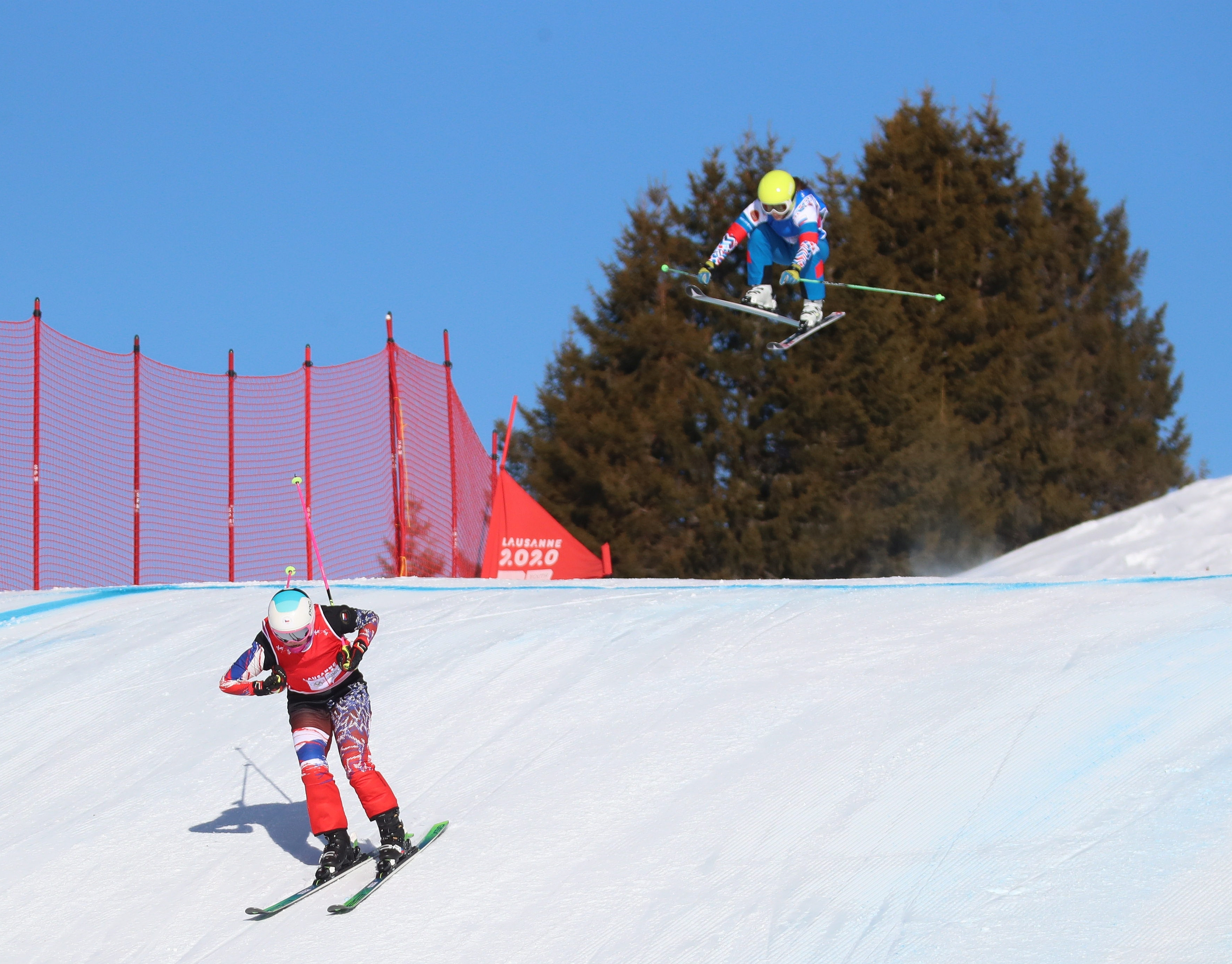
Pre-heat 2

=== Quarterfinals ===
Quarterfinal 1

Rank	Bib	Country	Notes
1	8	Mixed Team 3	Q
2	9	Mixed Team 4	Q
3	1	Australia	
4	20	Mixed Team 12	

Quarterfinal 2

Rank	Bib	Country	Notes
1	4	Mixed Team 1	Q
2	12	Germany	Q
3	17	Mixed Team 9	
4	5	China	

Quarterfinal 3

Rank	Bib	Country	Notes
1	3	Switzerland	Q
2	14	Czech Republic	Q
3	6	Mixed Team 2	
	11	Mixed Team 5	DNS

Quarterfinal 4

Rank	Bib	Country	Notes
1	10	Austria	Q
2	7	Russia	Q
3	2	France	
4	19	Mixed Team 11	

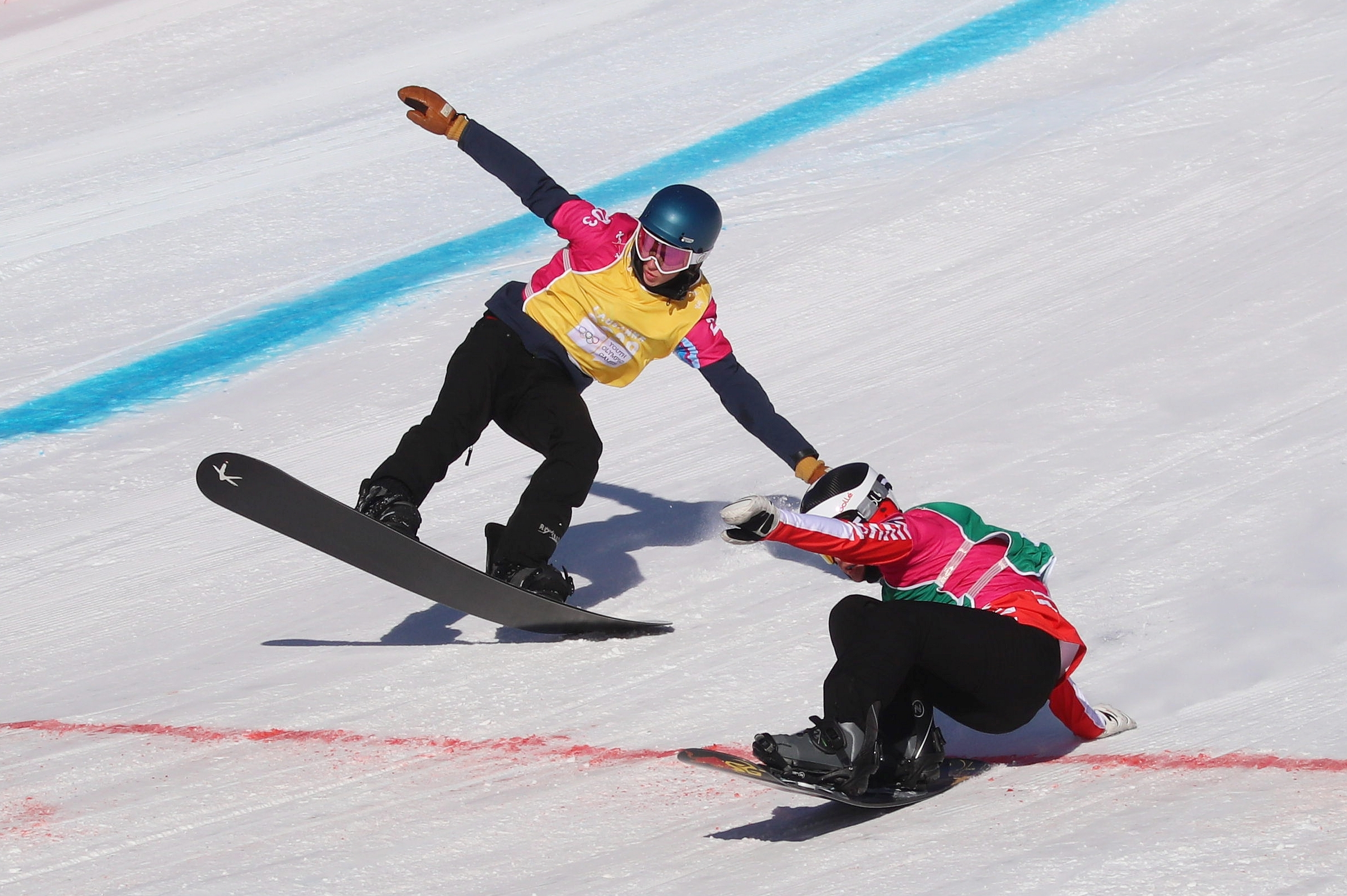
Quarterfinal 1

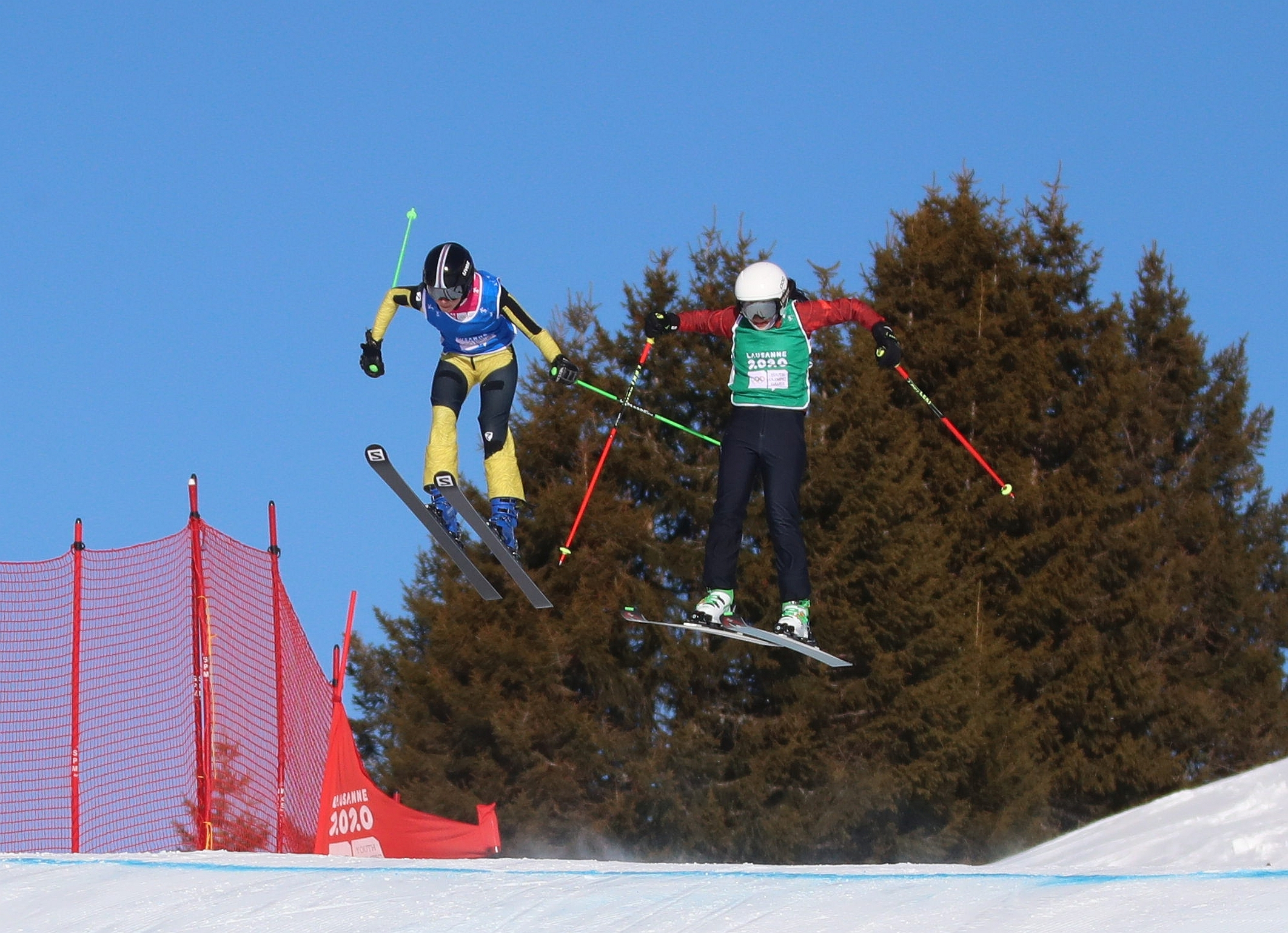
Quarterfinal 2

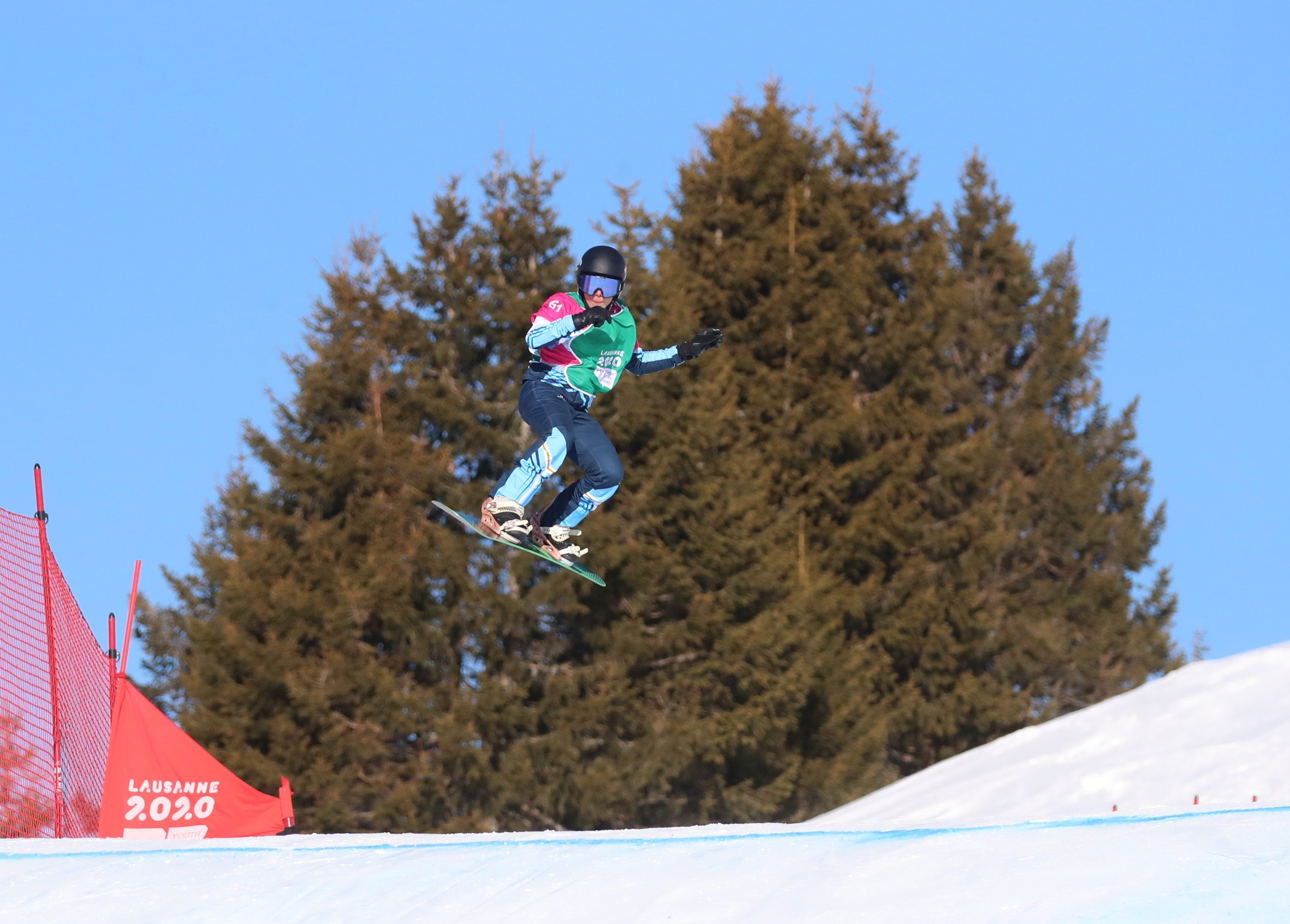
Quarterfinal 3

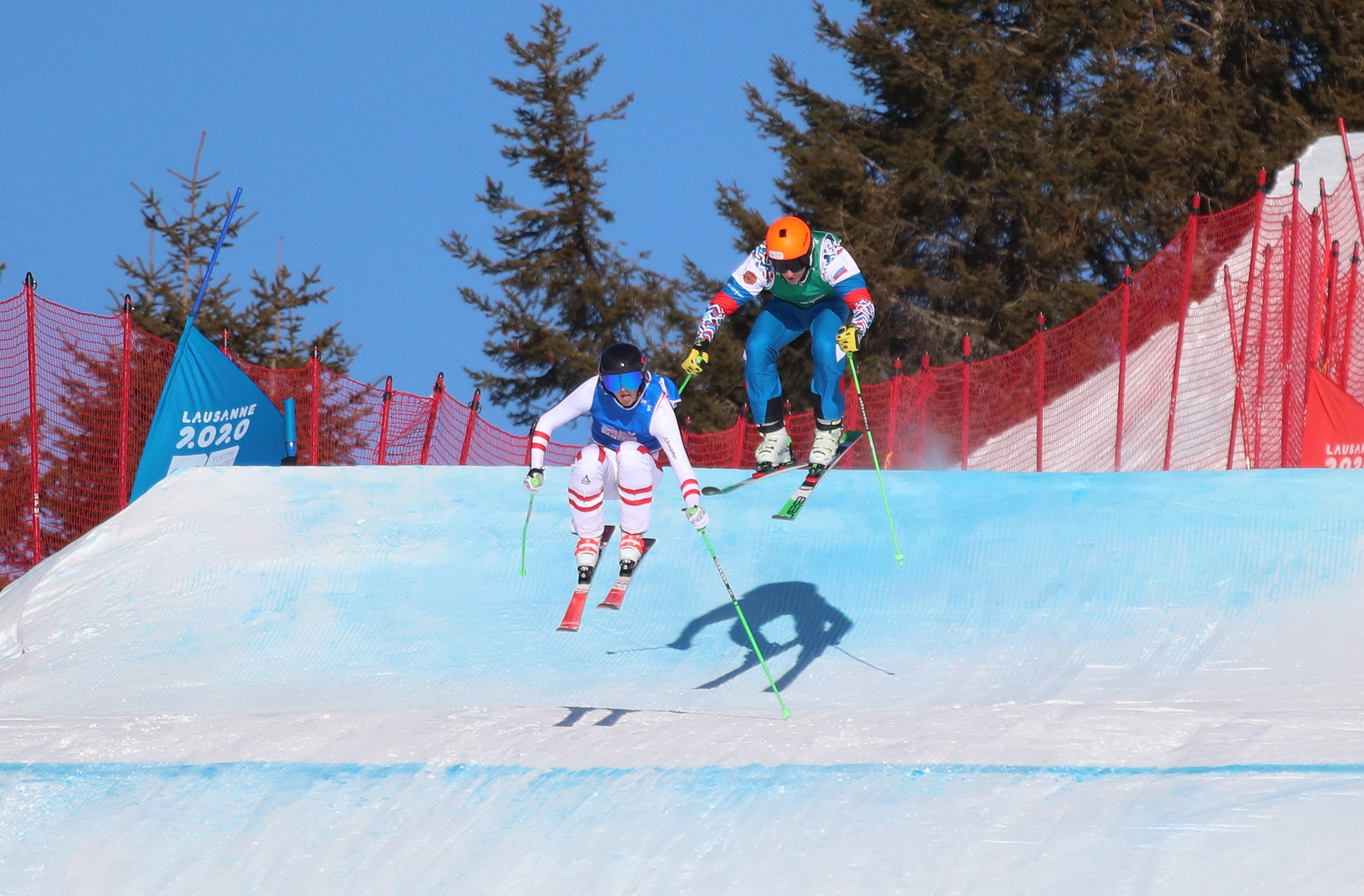
Quarterfinal 4

=== Semifinals ===
Semifinal 1

Rank	Bib	Country	Notes
1	12	Germany	BF
2	8	Mixed Team 3	BF
3	9	Mixed Team 4	SF
4	4	Mixed Team 1	SF

Semifinal 2

Rank	Bib	Country	Notes
1	3	Switzerland	BF
2	7	Russia	BF
3	10	Austria	SF
4	14	Czech Republic	SF

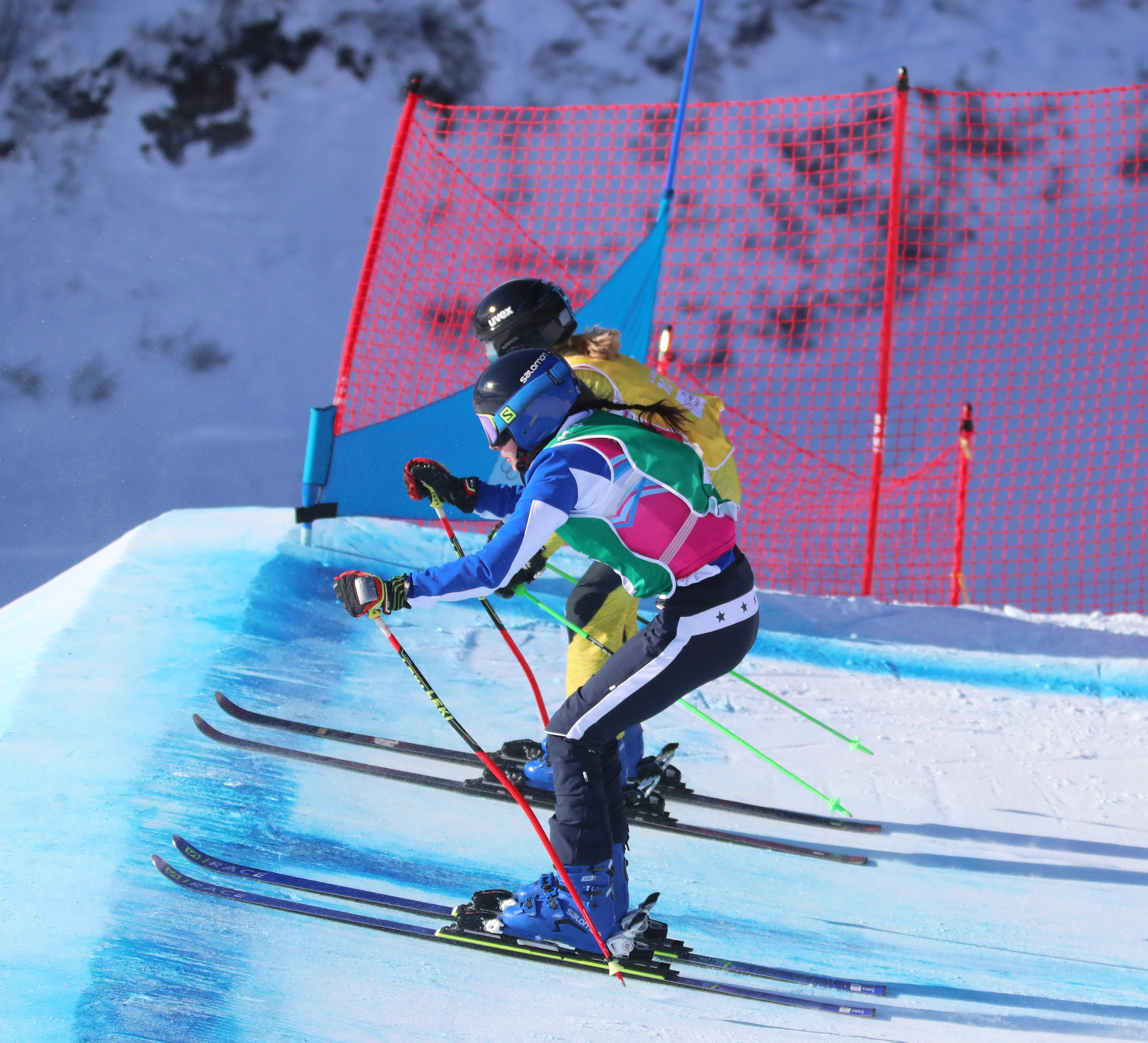
Semifinal 1

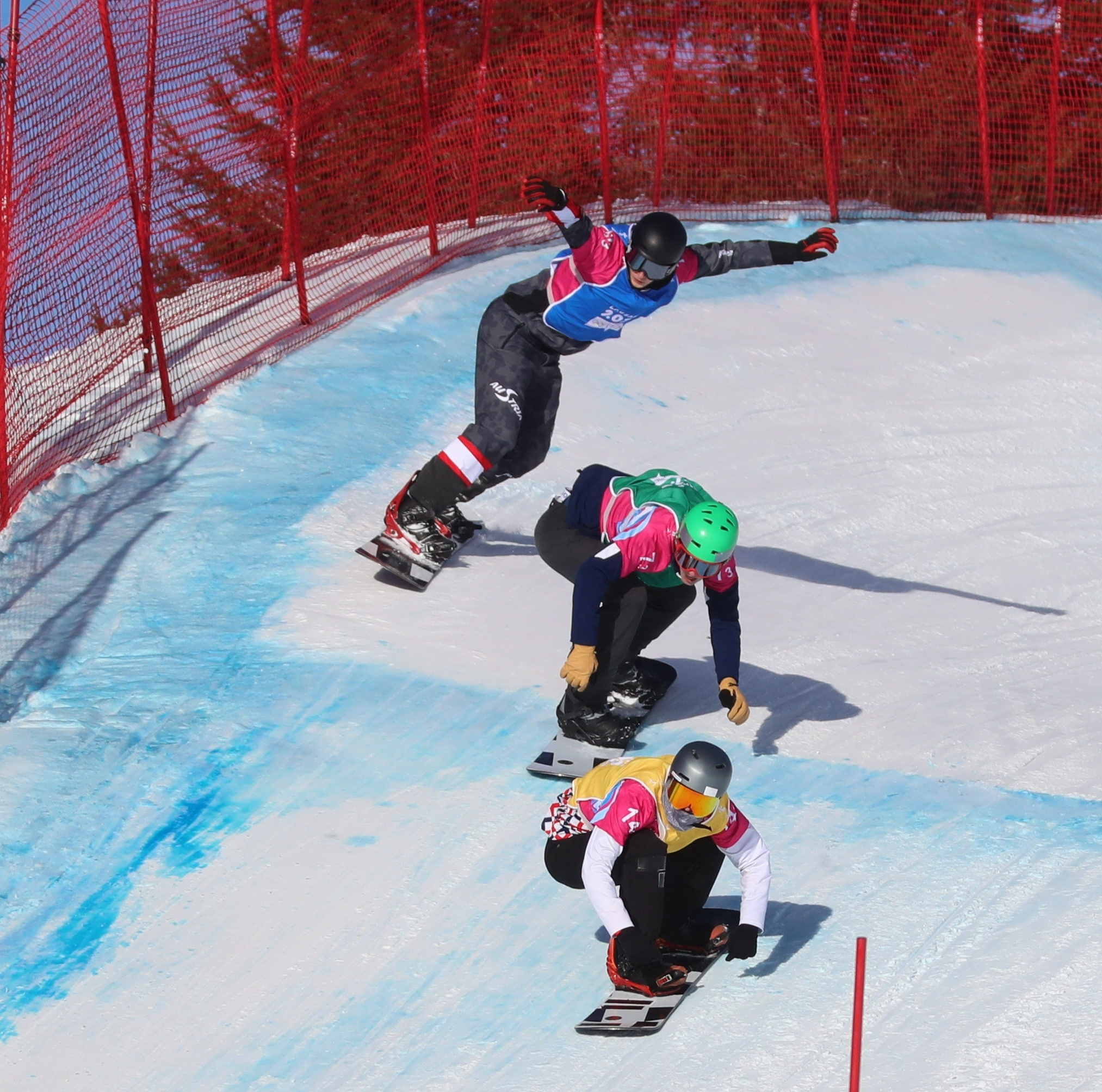
Semifinal 2

=== Finals ===
==== Small final ====
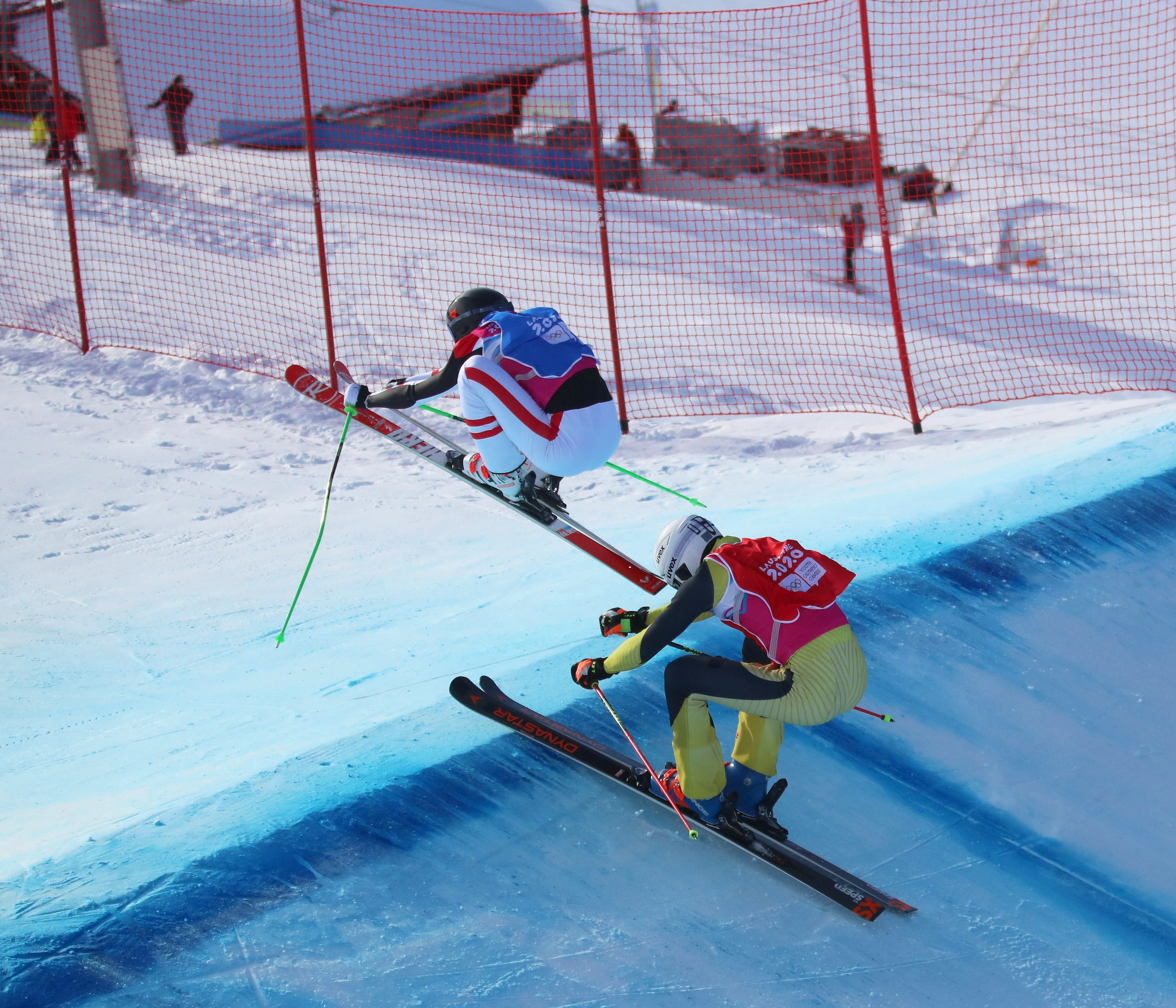
Small final

Rank	Bib	Country	Notes
5	4	Mixed Team 1	
6	14	Czech Republic	
7	10	Austria	
8	9	Mixed Team 4	

==== Big final ====
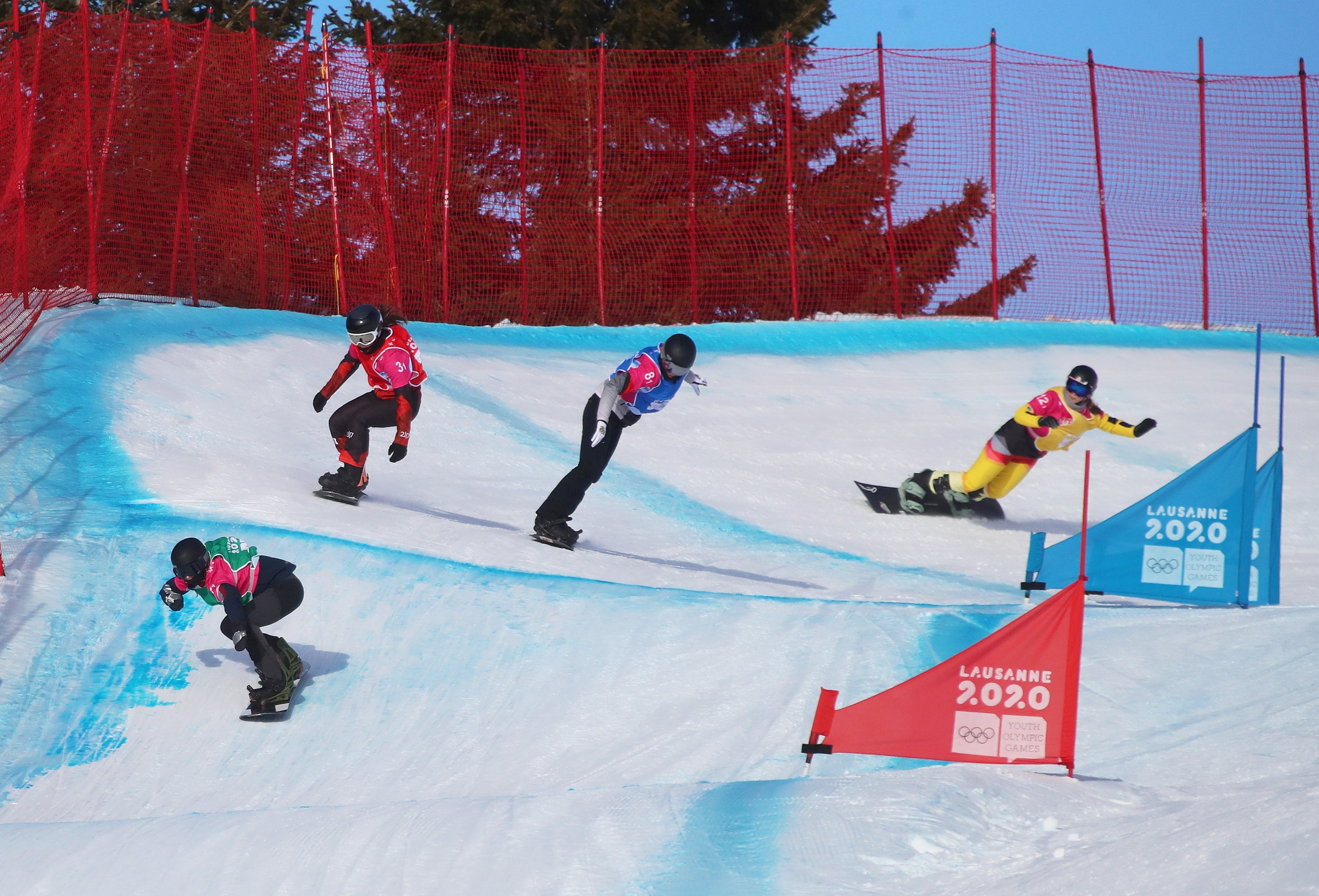
Big final

Rank	Bib	Country	Notes
1st place, gold medalist(s)	3	Switzerland	
2nd place, silver medalist(s)	7	Russia	
3rd place, bronze medalist(s)	12	Germany	
4	8	Mixed Team 3	
