= Freestyle skiing at the 2020 Winter Youth Olympics – Girls' ski cross =

Girls' ski cross at the III Winter Youth Olympic Games
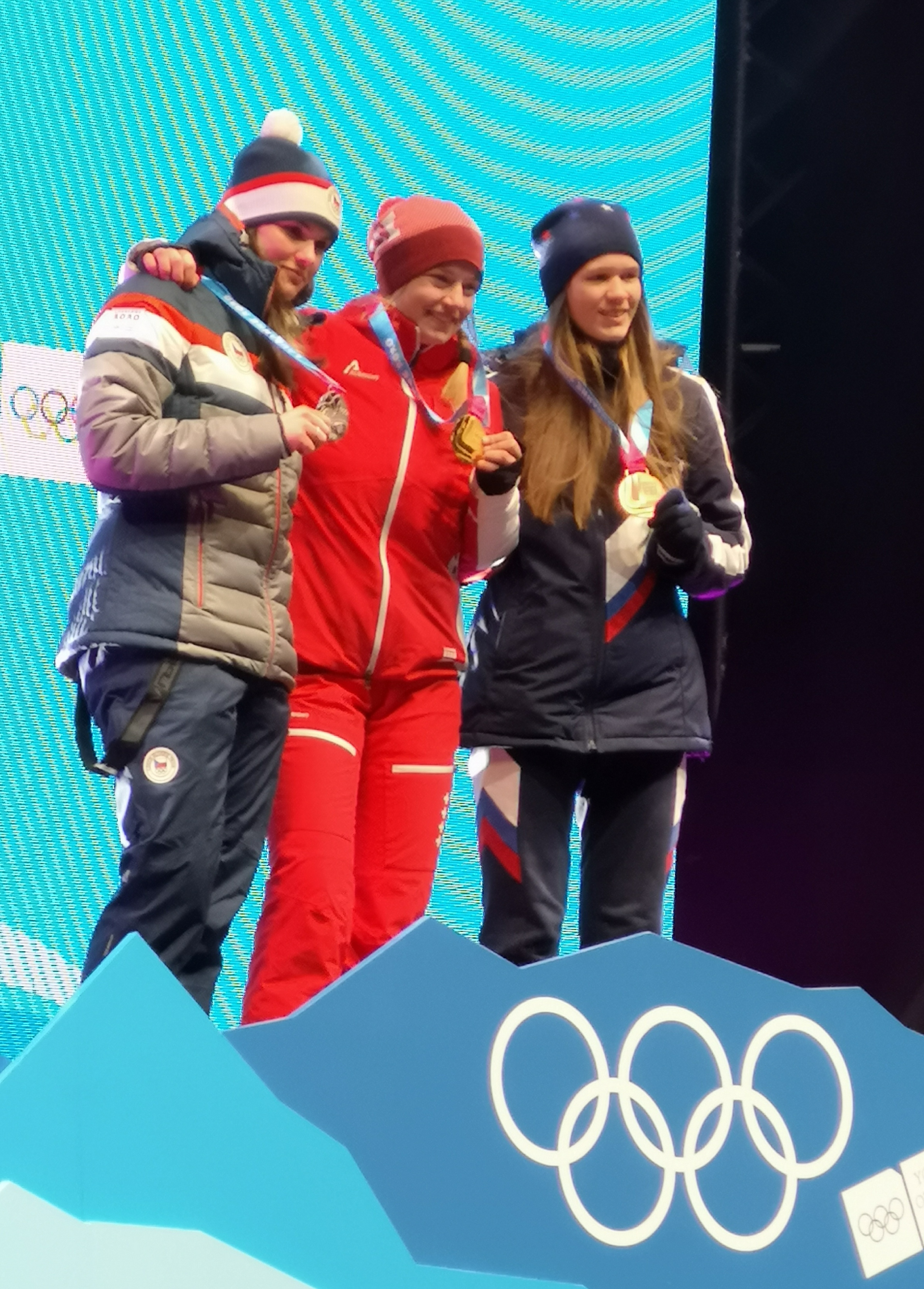
- Venue: Villars Winter Park
- Dates: 19 January
- Competitors: 24 from 17 nations

Medalists
1st place, gold medalist(s)		Marie Krista	Switzerland
2nd place, silver medalist(s)		Diana Cholenská	Czech Republic
3rd place, bronze medalist(s)		Vladislava Baliukina	Russia

The girls' ski cross event in freestyle skiing at the 2020 Winter Youth Olympics took place on 19 January at the Villars Winter Park.

== Results ==
=== Group heats ===
Panel 1

Rank	Bib	Athlete	Group 1				Group 2				Group 3				Group 4				Group 5				Total
Rank	Bib	Athlete	1	2	3	4	5	6	7	8	9	10	11	12	13	14	15	16	17	18	19	20	Total
1	12	Mariia Erofeeva (RUS)		4				4			4							4			4		20
2	8	Vladislava Baliukina (RUS)	4							4				4				3				4	19
3	9	Léa Hudry (FRA)		3			4					4					4					3	18
4	1	Alice Fortkord (SWE)	3				3				3				4				4				17
5	4	Sage Stefani (CAN)	2					3				3				4				4			16
6	5	Kyra Wheatley (AUS)	1						4				4				3				3		15
7	20	Noa Spoelders (BEL)			4			2						3			2		3				14
8	13	Lia Nilsson (SWE)		2					3					2	3					3			13
9	24	Kayla Anna Lozáková (SVK)			3					3		2			2						2		12
10	16	Josefina Valdés (CHI)		1						2			3			3			2				11
11	21	Anel Sufashova (KAZ)			2				2		2					2						2	10
12	17	Su Yue (CHN)			1		2						2					2		2			9

Panel 2

Rank	Bib	Athlete	Group 6				Group 7				Group 8				Group 9				Group 10				Total
Rank	Bib	Athlete	1	2	3	4	5	6	7	8	9	10	11	12	13	14	15	16	17	18	19	20	Total
1	22	Diana Cholenská (CZE)			4				4		4					4						4	20
2	3	Marie Krista (SUI)	4					4				4				3				4			19
3	7	Marie-Pier Brunet (CAN)	3							4				4				4				3	18
4	2	Ingrid Leivestad (NOR)	2				4				3				3				4				16
5	11	Nina Walderbach (GER)		3				3			2							3			4		15
5	15	Marta Rihtaršič (SLO)		4						3			4			2			2				15
5	19	Leonie Innerhofer (AUT)			3			2						3			4		3				15
8	14	Zoe Michael (AUS)		2					3					2	4					3			14
9	10	Maria Shcherbakovskaya (ISR)		1			3				3						3					2	12
10	6	Ran Hongyun (CHN)	1						2			DNF					2				3		11
11	18	Aurélie Sainz (SUI)			DNF		DNF					DNS						DNS		DNS			4
12	23	Hanka Krčálová (CZE)			DNF					DNS	DNS			DNS							DNS		2

=== Semifinals ===
Semifinal 1

Rank	Bib	Name	Deficit	Notes
1	3	Marie Krista (SUI)		BF
2	12	Mariia Erofeeva (RUS)	+1.41	BF
3	1	Alice Fortkord (SWE)	+1.78	SF
4	7	Marie-Pier Brunet (CAN)	DNF	SF

Semifinal 2

Rank	Bib	Name	Deficit	Notes
1	22	Diana Cholenská (CZE)		BF
2	8	Vladislava Baliukina (RUS)	+1.20	BF
3	9	Léa Hudry (FRA)	+1.22	SF
4	2	Ingrid Leivestad (NOR)	+2.24	SF

=== Finals ===
Small final

Rank	Bib	Name	Deficit
5	7	Marie-Pier Brunet (CAN)	
6	9	Léa Hudry (FRA)	+2.57
7	1	Alice Fortkord (SWE)	+2.64
8	2	Ingrid Leivestad (NOR)	DNF

Big final

Rank	Bib	Name	Deficit
1st place, gold medalist(s)	3	Marie Krista (SUI)	
2nd place, silver medalist(s)	22	Diana Cholenská (CZE)	+0.32
3rd place, bronze medalist(s)	8	Vladislava Baliukina (RUS)	+0.81
4	12	Mariia Erofeeva (RUS)	DNF
