= Curling at the 2020 Winter Youth Olympics =

Curling at the III Winter Youth Olympic Games
- Venue: Palladium de Champéry
- Dates: 10–22 January
- Competitors: 96 from 24 nations

Curling at the 2020 Winter Youth Olympics took place at the Palladium de Champéry in Champéry, Switzerland from 10 to 22 January 2020.

The curling competition has been expanded, to allow for a further eight mixed teams to qualify, meaning a total of 96 curlers from 24 nations qualified to compete.

== Medal summary ==
=== Medal table ===
Rank	Nation	Gold	Silver	Bronze	Total
–	Mixed-NOCs	1	1	1	3
1	Norway	1	0	0	1
2	Japan	0	1	0	1
3	Russia	0	0	1	1
Totals (3 entries)		2	2	2	6

=== Events ===
Games	Gold	Silver	Bronze
Mixed team	Norway; Lukas Høstmælingen; Grunde Buraas; Nora Østgård; Ingeborg Forbregd	Japan; Takumi Maeda; Momoha Tabata; Asei Nakahara; Mina Kobayashi	Russia; Valeriia Denisenko; Mikhail Vlasenko; Alina Fakhurtdinova; Nikolai Lysakov
Mixed doubles	Mixed-NOCs; Laura Nagy (HUN); Nathan Young (CAN)	Mixed-NOCs; Chana Beitone (FRA); Nikolai Lysakov (RUS)	Mixed-NOCs; Pei Junhang (CHN); Vít Chabičovský (CZE)

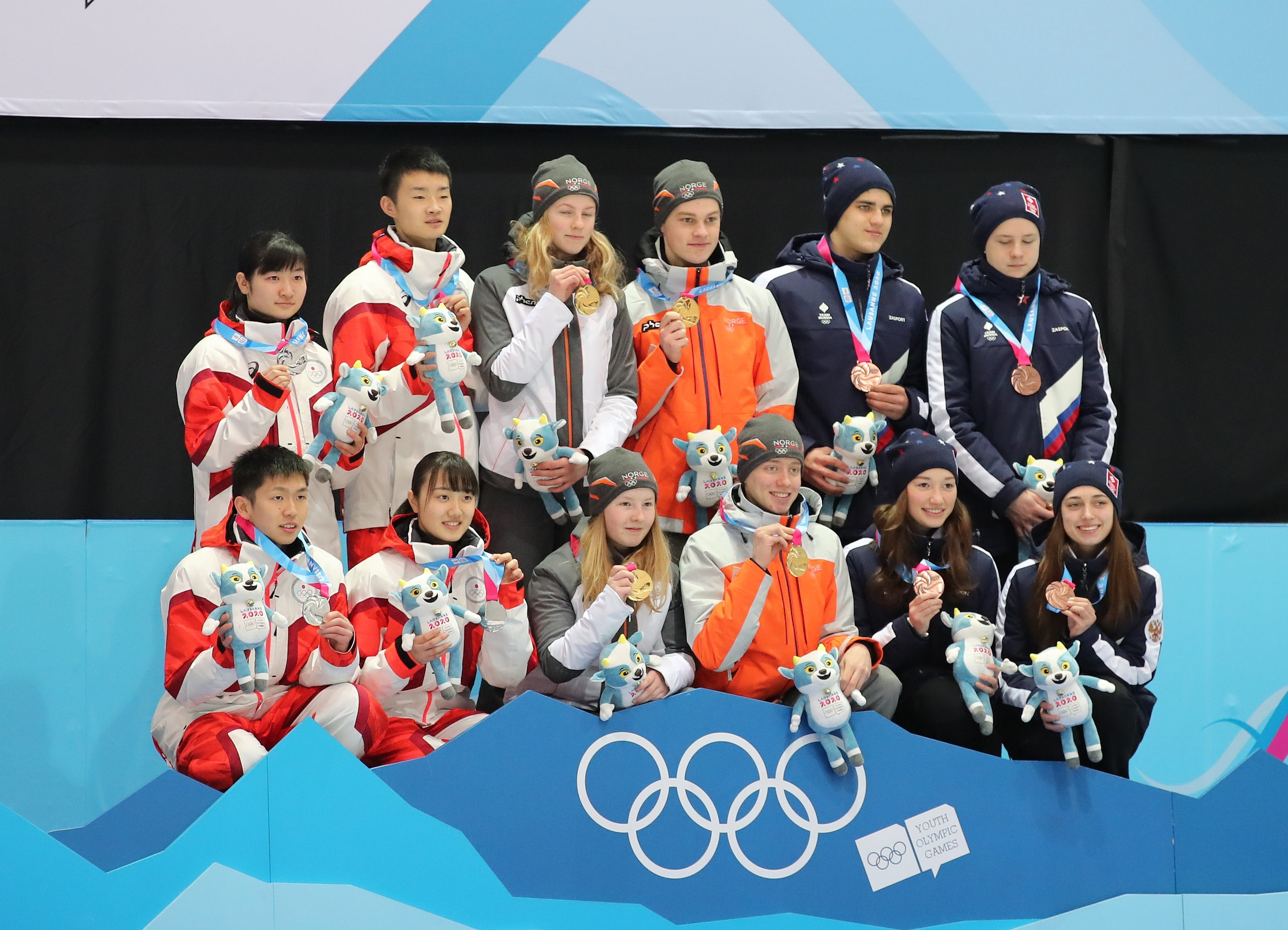
Mixed Team Medal Ceremony (from left to right): Japan, Norway, Russia

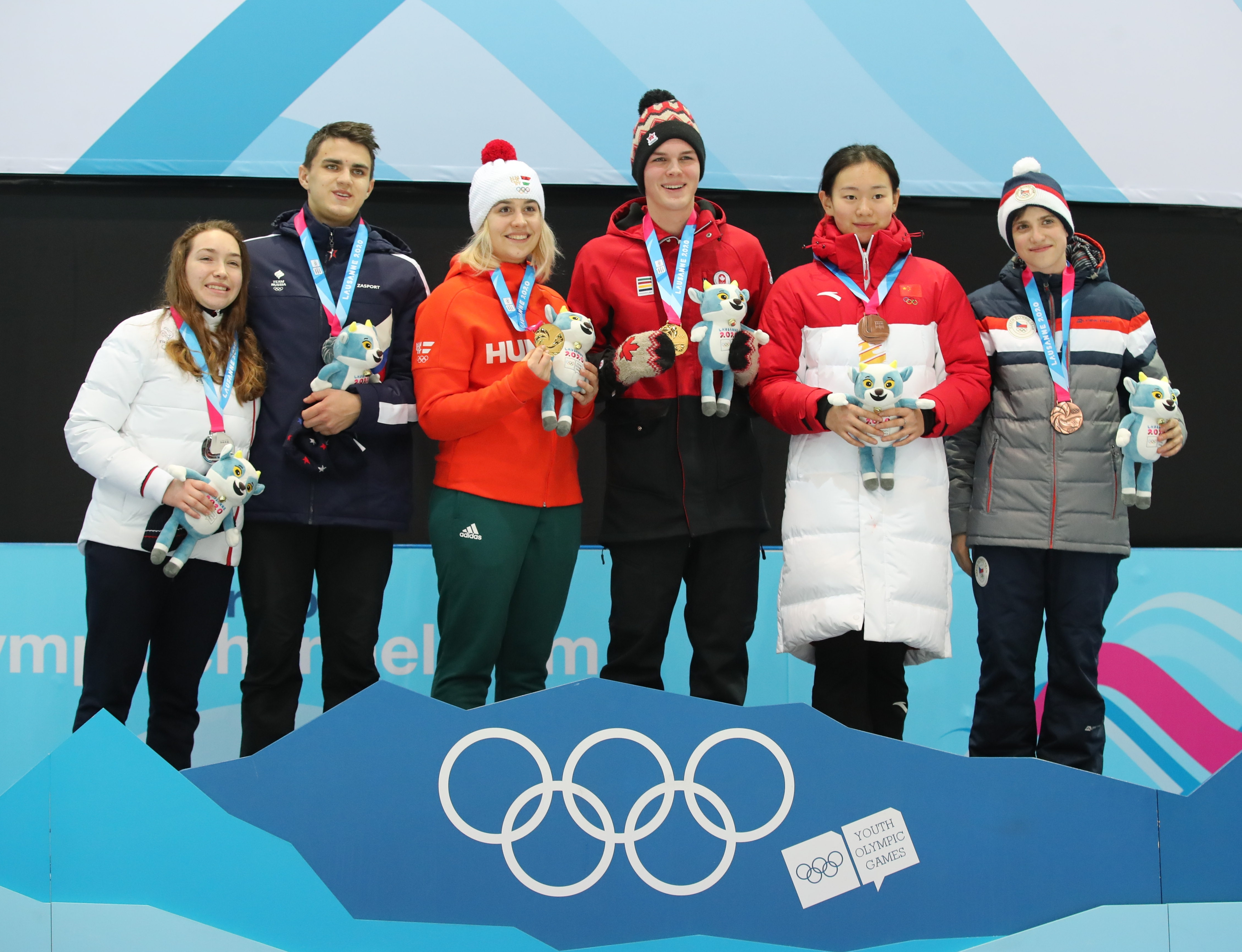
Mixed Doubles Medal Ceremony (from left to right): Chana Beitone, Nikolai Lysakov (silver); Laura Nagy, Nathan Young (gold); Pei Junhang, Vít Chabičovský (bronze)

== Qualification ==
A total of 24 countries qualified based on their placement points from various events. At the end of the qualification period, the top two North American, top three Asian and top eight European teams qualified, along with the top placed team from the Oceania and South America. Host nation Switzerland was also guaranteed a spot. The remaining eight teams were awarded alternating from the WCF Junior women's and men's rankings. A total of seven nations are scheduled to make their Winter Youth Olympics debut in the sport: Denmark, France, Hungary, Latvia, Poland, Slovenia and Spain.

=== Qualification timeline ===
Events	Date	Venue
2018 World Junior B Curling Championships	January 3–10	(Finland) Lohja
2018 World Junior Curling Championships	March 3–10	(United Kingdom) Aberdeen
2019 World Junior-B Curling Championships	January 2–10	(Finland) Lohja
2019 World Junior Curling Championships	February 16–23	(Canada) Liverpool

=== Summary ===
Region	Vacancies	Qualified
Host Nation	1	Switzerland
Asia	3	China; South Korea; Japan
Europe	8	Norway; Sweden; Great Britain; Russia; Germany; Italy; Turkey; Hungary
North America	2	Canada; United States
Oceania	1	New Zealand
South America	1	Brazil
Men's junior world ranking	4	Spain; Latvia; France; Slovenia
Women's junior world ranking	4	Czech Republic; Poland; Estonia; Denmark
TOTAL	24	
