= Artyom Duda =

Russian ice hockey player (born 2004)

- Born: 8 April 2004 (age 22) Moscow, Russia
- Height: 6 ft 1 in (185 cm)
- Weight: 187 lb (85 kg; 13 st 5 lb)
- Position: Defence
- Shoots: Left
- NHL team Former teams: Utah Mammoth; CSKA Moscow
- NHL draft: 36th overall, 2022; Arizona Coyotes
- Playing career: 2022–present

Artyom Pavlovich Duda (Russian: Артём Павлович Дуда; born 8 April 2004) is a Russian professional ice hockey defenceman for the Utah Mammoth of the National Hockey League (NHL). He was drafted 36th overall by the Arizona Coyotes in the 2022 NHL entry draft. He previously played for CSKA Moscow of the Kontinental Hockey League (KHL).

== Playing career ==
Duda was drafted in the second round, 36th overall, by the Arizona Coyotes in the 2022 NHL entry draft. During the 2021–22 season, he recorded 14 goals and 27 assists in 52 games with Krasnaya Armiya of the MHL. During the playoffs he recorded five goals and 12 assists in 18 games and led all MHL defensemen in playoff scoring. During the 2022–23 season, he split time between the Kontinental Hockey League (KHL) and the MHL. He recorded three assists in 14 games for CSKA Moscow of the KHL and recorded five goals and eight assists in 14 games with Krasnaya Armiya of the MHL.

Following the season he moved to North America in January 2024 and attended Toronto Metropolitan University where he played for the TMU Bold. He recorded two goals and five assists in 12 regular season games. During the playoffs he recorded two goals and four assists in and helped TMU advance to the 2024 U Sports University Cup bronze medal game.

On 10 July 2024, Duda signed a three-year, entry-level contract with the Utah Hockey Club. During the 2024–25 season, he recorded six goals and 23 assists in 70 games for the Tucson Roadrunners of the American Hockey League (AHL). He led all Roadrunners rookies in scoring with 29 points, the 10th-most points by a rookie in franchise history and the third-most by a rookie defenseman. His plus-15 rating ranked fourth among rookie defensemen in the AHL and established a franchise record for the highest single-season plus-minus rating by a rookie defenseman.

On 23 October 2026, he signed a two-year contract extension with the Mammoth. He made his NHL debut for the Mammoth on 29 October 2026 against the Pittsburgh Penguins.

== International play ==
Medal record

Representing Russia

Ice hockey

World U18 Championships
Silver medal – second place	2021 United States	

Duda represented Russia at the 2020 Winter Youth Olympics where he recorded four assists in four games and won a gold medal.

He represented Russia at the 2021 IIHF World U18 Championships and recorded one goal in six games and won a silver medal. In July 2021, he was selected to compete at the 2021 Hlinka Gretzky Cup. During the tournament he recorded two assists in five games and won a gold medal.

== Career statistics ==
=== Regular season and playoffs ===
			Regular season					Playoffs
Season	Team	League	GP	G	A	Pts	PIM	GP	G	A	Pts	PIM
2020–21	Krasnaya Armiya	MHL	40	1	8	9	0	—	—	—	—	—
2021–22	Krasnaya Armiya	MHL	52	14	27	41	0	18	5	12	17	0
2021–22	Zvezda Moscow	VHL	4	0	0	0	0	—	—	—	—	—
2022–23	Krasnaya Armiya	MHL	14	5	8	13	2	4	0	0	0	0
2022–23	Zvezda Moscow	VHL	3	0	0	0	0	—	—	—	—	—
2022–23	CSKA Moscow.	KHL	14	0	3	3	0	—	—	—	—	—
2023–24	Toronto Metropolitan University	OUA	12	2	5	7	10	6	2	4	6	0
2024–25	Tucson Roadrunners	AHL	70	6	23	29	14	3	1	1	2	0
2025–26	Tucson Roadrunners	AHL	27	2	11	13	22	—	—	—	—	—
AHL totals			97	8	34	42	36	3	1	1	2	0
KHL totals			14	0	3	3	6	—	—	—	—	—

=== International ===
Year	Team	Event	Result	GP	G	A	Pts	PIM
2021	Russia	U18	2nd place, silver medalist(s)	6	1	0	1	0
2021	Russia	HG18	1st place, gold medalist(s)	5	0	2	2	4
Junior totals				11	1	2	3	4
