= Kirill Kudryavtsev =

Russian ice hockey player

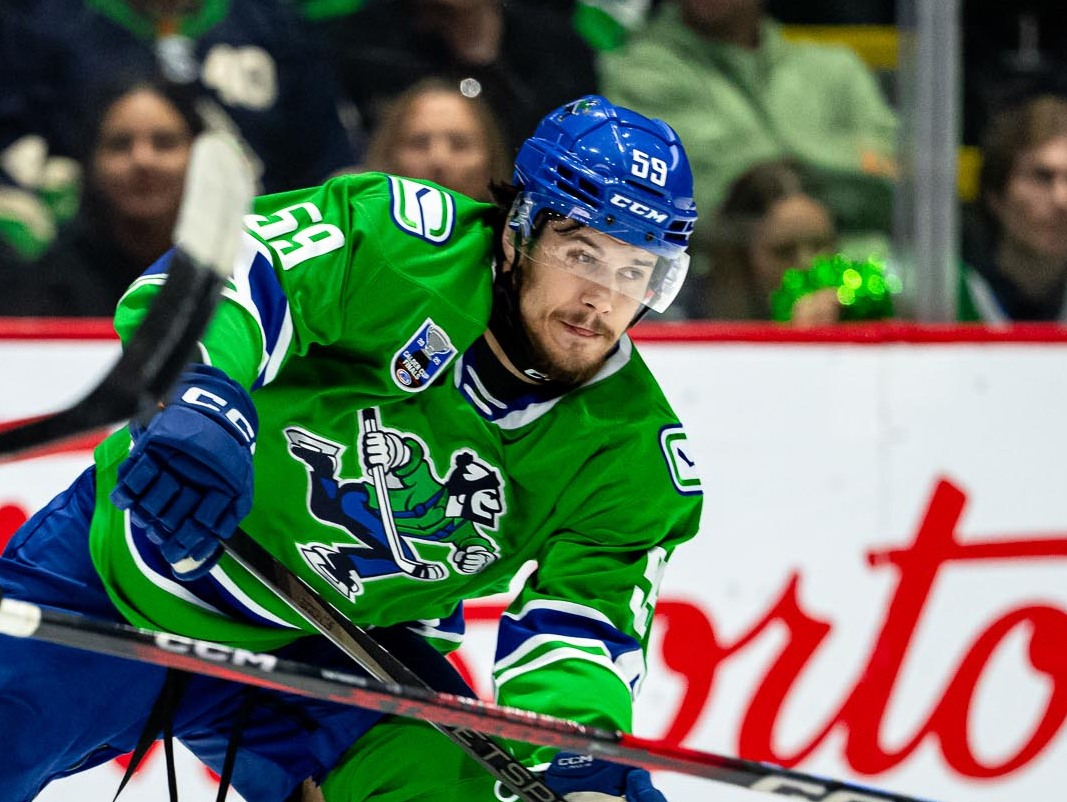
- Kudryavtsev with the Abbotsford Canucks in 2025.
- Born: 5 February 2004 (age 22) Yaroslavl, Yaroslavl Oblast, Russia
- Height: 5 ft 11 in (180 cm)
- Weight: 200 lb (91 kg; 14 st 4 lb)
- Position: Defence
- Shoots: Left
- NHL team (P) Cur. team: Vancouver Canucks; Abbotsford Canucks (AHL)
- NHL draft: 208th overall, 2022; Vancouver Canucks
- Playing career: 2024–present

Kirill Kudryavtsev (born 5 February 2004) is a Russian professional ice hockey defenceman. He currently plays for the Abbotsford Canucks of the American Hockey League while under contract with the Vancouver Canucks of the National Hockey League (NHL).

== Early life ==
Kudryavtsev was born on 5 February 2004, in Yaroslavl, Yaroslavl Oblast, Russia.

== Playing career ==
=== Amateur ===
Kudryavtsev recorded two goals and seven points over 20 games with Loko Yaroslavl in the MHL in the 2020–21 season. He also represented Russia at the 2020 Youth Olympics and the 2021 Hlinka Gretzky Cup. In August 2021, Kudryavtsev was drafted in the first round, sixth overall, by the Sault Ste. Marie Greyhounds in the 2021 Canadian Hockey League (CHL) Import Draft. He made plans to move to the United States despite some resistance from his family, and because he did not speak English, his agent arranged a tutor for him. Due to immigration clearance issues, Kudryavtsev missed the start of the Greyhounds' training camp but was expected to arrive before the 2021–22 season began. Kudryavtsev recorded his first Ontario Hockey League (OHL) point, an assist, on 15 October and scored his first goal on 11 November against the London Knights. In January, Kudryavtsev was ranked 103rd among all eligible North American skaters by the NHL Central Scouting Bureau. Throughout his rookie season, Kudryavtsev began to earn more responsibility from the coaching staff and played on the team's powerplay and penalty killing unit. He finished the regular season with five goals and 34 assists for 39 points through 68 games. There was little consensus on Kudryavtsev's draft position as both TSN's Director of Scouting Craig Button and the NHL Central Scouting Bureau ranked him differently. Kudryavtsev was eventually drafted in the seventh round, 208th overall, by the Vancouver Canucks in the 2022 NHL entry draft.

Kudryavtsev returned to the Sault Ste. Marie Greyhounds for the 2022–23 season after attending the Canucks' 2022 training camp. He improved offensively in his sophomore season and was named an assistant captain on 25 January. At the time, he ranked fifth among all OHL defencemen with six goals and 30 assists. While he did not score anymore goals, Kudryavtsev finished the season leading all team defencemen with 45 points. In recognition of his efforts, Kudryavtsev received the team's Most Gentlemanly Player award and Best Defenseman award. Kudryavtsev signed a three-year, entry level contract with the Vancouver Canucks on 10 March 2023.

Kudryavtsev again attended the Canucks' training camp before returning to the Greyhounds for the 2023–24 season. He remained in British Columbia in the summer to train with various local players including Connor Bedard, Mathew Barzal, and Alexander Kerfoot. Kudryavtsev was recognized as the OHL's Player of the Week on 30 October after scoring two goals and four assists in three games. By December, he had accumulated three goals and 19 assists for 22 points through 27 games. Kudryavtsev finished his third OHL season with five goals and 47 points through 67 games and was the Greyhounds nominee for the OHL's Most Outstanding Player.

=== Professional ===
After attending the Canucks' 2024 training camp, Kudryavtsev was reassigned to their American Hockey League (AHL) affiliate, the Abbotsford Canucks. He participated in Abbotsford's training camp and was named to their opening night roster. He scored his first career AHL goal on 29 October 2024 in a 3–0 win over the Tucson Roadrunners. Kudryavtsev finished his rookie season tied for second in points among team defensemen with five goals and 21 assists. He was called up by the Vancouver Canucks on 14 April under emergency conditions. He skated 13:33 minutes in his NHL debut that night against the San Jose Sharks and finished with one shot on net. Kudryavtsev played in one more game for the Canucks before being returned to the AHL. Upon rejoining the Abbotsford Canucks, Kudryavtsev helped lead them to the 2025 Calder Cup over the Charlotte Checkers.

== Career statistics ==
=== Regular season and playoffs ===
			Regular season					Playoffs
Season	Team	League	GP	G	A	Pts	PIM	GP	G	A	Pts	PIM
2020–21	Loko Yaroslavl	MHL	20	2	5	7	8	—	—	—	—	—
2020–21	Loko-Yunior Yaroslavl	NMHL	10	1	3	4	2	—	—	—	—	—
2021–22	Soo Greyhounds	OHL	68	5	34	39	10	10	0	4	4	6
2022–23	Soo Greyhounds	OHL	67	8	42	50	14	—	—	—	—	—
2023–24	Soo Greyhounds	OHL	67	5	42	47	18	11	1	8	9	0
2024–25	Abbotsford Canucks	AHL	65	5	21	26	22	21	1	9	10	4
2024–25	Vancouver Canucks	NHL	2	0	0	0	0	—	—	—	—	—
2025–26	Abbotsford Canucks	AHL	44	2	18	20	4	—	—	—	—	—
2025–26	Vancouver Canucks	NHL	3	0	2	2	0	—	—	—	—	—
NHL totals			5	0	2	2	0	—	—	—	—	—

=== International ===
Year	Team	Event	Result	GP	G	A	Pts	PIM
2021	Russia U18	HG18	1st place, gold medalist(s)	5	1	1	2	4
Junior totals				5	1	1	2	4

== Awards and honours ==
Award	Year	Ref
AHL
Calder Cup Champion	2025	
