= Israel at the 2020 Winter Youth Olympics =

- IOC code: ISR
- NOC: Olympic Committee of Israel
- Website: www.olympicsil.co.il (in Hebrew and English)

in Lausanne
- Competitors: 3 in 3 sports
- Flag bearer: Nikita Kovalenko
- Medals: Gold 0 Silver 1 Bronze 1 Total 2

Winter Youth Olympics appearances (overview)
- 2016; 2020; 2024

Israel competed at the 2020 Winter Youth Olympics in Lausanne, Switzerland from 9 to 22 January 2020. The Israeli delegation consisted of 3 athletes who competed in three sports. The alpine ski skier, Noa Szollos, made history when she won Israel's first Olympic winter medals.

== Medalists ==
Medal	Name	Sport	Event	Date
Silver	Noa Szollos	Alpine skiing	Combined	11 Jan
Bronze	Noa Szollos	Alpine skiing	Super-G	10 Jan

== Alpine skiing ==
Girls

Athlete	Event	Run 1		Run 2		Total	
Athlete	Event	Time	Rank	Time	Rank	Time	Rank
Noa Szollos	Slalom	DNF		Did not advance			
Noa Szollos	Giant slalom	DNF		Did not advance			
Noa Szollos	Super-G	—N/a				56.36	(bronze)
Noa Szollos	Combined	56.36	3	38.33	10	1:34.69	(silver)

== Figure skating ==
Israeli figure skaters Hailey Kops and Artem Tsoglin achieved quota places for the Pair Skating event for Israel based on the results of the 2019 World Junior Figure Skating Championships. Israel gave up the quota in the Pair Skating event. However, Israel achieved another quota in the Boys singles event based on Mark Gorodnitsky position in the 2019–20 ISU Junior Grand Prix.

Athletes	Event	SP/SD		FS/FD		Total	
Athletes	Event	Points	Rank	Points	Rank	Points	Rank
Nikita Kovalenko	Boys' singles	44.71	15	87.41	15	132.12	15

== Freestyle skiing ==
Ski cross

Athlete	Event	Group heats		Semifinal	Final	Rank
Athlete	Event	Points	Rank	Position	Position	Rank
Maria Shcherbakovskaya	Girls' ski cross	12	9	Did not advance		17

== Snowboarding ==
Snowboard and ski cross relay

Athlete	Event	Pre-heat	Quarterfinal	Semifinal	Final
Athlete	Event	Position	Position	Position	Position
Mixed Team 3 Ekaterina Lokteva-Zagorskaia (RUS); Maria Shcherbakovskaya (ISR); Noa Coutton-Jean (FRA); Artem Bazhin (RUS)	Team ski-snowboard cross	Bye	1 Q	2 Q	4

== See also ==
- Israel at the 2020 Summer Olympics
