= Nikita Filippov (ski mountaineer) =

Russian ski mountaineer (born 2002)

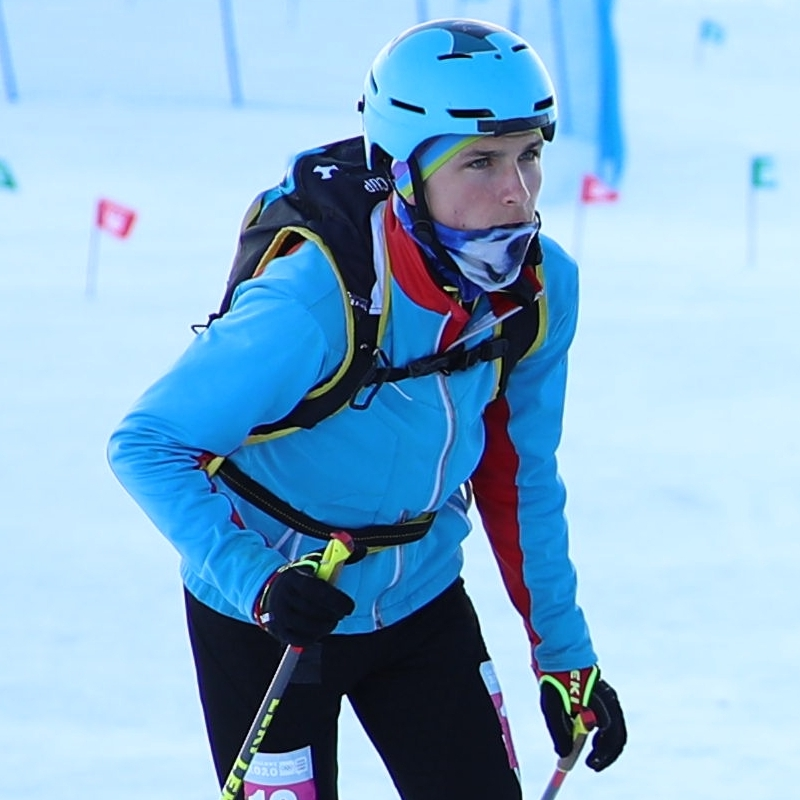
- Filippov at the 2020 Winter Youth Olympics

Personal information
- Native name: Никита Алексеевич Филиппов
- Full name: Nikita Alekseyevich Filippov
- Other names: Nikita Philippov
- Born: 22 November 2002 (age 23) Kamchatka Krai, Russia

Sport
- Country: Russia
- Sport: Ski mountaineering
Medal record
Men's ski mountaineering
Representing Individual Neutral Athletes
Olympic Games
Silver medal – second place	2026 Milano Cortina	Sprint

Nikita Alekseyevich Filippov (Russian: Никита Алексеевич Филиппов, born 22 November 2002) is a Russian ski mountaineer. As a Neutral Athlete at the 2026 Winter Olympics, he won a silver medal in the sprint race.

== Career ==
Throughout his career, he has represented Russia, including at the 2020 Winter Youth Olympics in ski mountaineering, an event making its Youth Olympics debut. His best finish was sixth place in the sprint race. He competed at the 2025 World Championship of Ski Mountaineering and finished in seventh place in the vertical race, and won a silver medal in the U23 category.

During the 2024–25 ISMF Ski Mountaineering World Cup, he finished in the top eight four times at the World Cup. During the 2025–26 ISMF Ski Mountaineering World Cup on 15 January 2026, he earned his first career World Cup podium, finishing in third place. He earned his second career podium finish on 31 January 2026, again finishing in third place.

He finished in third place in the Olympic qualification rankings, and qualified to represent Individual Neutral Athletes at the 2026 Winter Olympics. He became the first Russian to qualify for the Winter Olympics as a neutral athlete. During the Olympics, he won a silver medal in the sprint race with a time of 2:35.55. This marked the first medal for the Individual Neutral Athletes at the 2026 Winter Olympics.
