= 2019–20 in skiing =

== Alpine skiing ==
=== 2020 Winter Youth Olympics (FIS) and World Championships ===
- January 10 – 15: 2020 Winter Youth Olympics in (Switzerland) Les Diablerets
  - Boys' super-G winners: (gold) (Sweden) Adam Hofstedt; (silver) (Slovenia) Rok Ažnoh; (bronze) (Switzerland) Luc Roduit;
  - Boys' giant slalom winners: (gold) (Australia) Philip Hoffmann; (silver) (Switzerland) Sandro Zurbrügg; (bronze) (Switzerland) Luc Roduit;
  - Boys' slalom: (gold) (Sweden) Adam Hofstedt; (silver) (Switzerland) Luc Roduit; (bronze) (Italy) Edoardo Saracco;
  - Boys' combined: (gold) (France) Auguste Aulnette; (gold) (Norway) Mikkel Remsøy; (bronze) (Sweden) Adam Hofstedt;
    - Note: No silver medal was awarded here, due to a tie for first place, after all combined runs were completed.
  - Girls' super-G: (gold) (Switzerland) Amélie Klopfenstein; (silver) (France) Caitlin McFarlane; (bronze) (Israel) Noa Szollos;
  - Girls' giant slalom: (gold) (Switzerland) Amélie Klopfenstein; (silver) (Finland) Rosa Pohjolainen; (bronze) (Austria) Amanda Salzgeber;
  - Girls' slalom: (gold) (Sweden) Emma Sahlin; (silver) (Switzerland) Lena Volken (bronze) (Germany) Lara Klein;
  - Girls' combined: (gold) (Australia) Amanda Salzgeber; (silver) (Israel) Noa Szollos; (bronze) (Switzerland) Amélie Klopfenstein;
  - Parallel mixed team winner: (gold) Finland; (silver) Germany; (bronze) Austria;
- March 5 – 14: World Junior Alpine Skiing Championships 2020 in (Norway) Narvik

=== 2019–20 FIS Alpine Ski World Cup ===
- Note: For the FIS page about these events, click here.

October 2019

- October 26 & 27: ASWC #1 in (Austria) Sölden
  - Giant slalom winners: (France) Alexis Pinturault (m) / (New Zealand) Alice Robinson (f)

November 2019

- November 23 & 24: ASWC #2 in (Finland) Levi
  - Slalom winners: (Norway) Henrik Kristoffersen (m) / (United States) Mikaela Shiffrin (f)
- November 27 – December 1: ASWC #3 in (Canada) Lake Louise Ski Resort #1
  - Men's downhill winner: (Germany) Thomas Dreßen
  - Men's super giant slalom winner: (Austria) Matthias Mayer
- November 30 & December 1: ASWC #4 in (United States) Killington
  - Women's giant slalom winner: (Italy) Marta Bassino
  - Women's slalom winner: (United States) Mikaela Shiffrin

December 2019

- December 3 – 8: ASWC #5 in (Canada) Lake Louise Ski Resort #2
  - Women's downhill winners: (Czech Republic) Ester Ledecká (#1) / (Austria) Nicole Schmidhofer (#2)
  - Women's super giant slalom winner: (Germany) Viktoria Rebensburg
- December 3 – 8: ASWC #6 in (United States) Beaver Creek Resort
  - Men's super giant slalom winner: (Switzerland) Marco Odermatt
  - Men's downhill winner: (Switzerland) Beat Feuz
  - Men's giant slalom winner: (United States) Tommy Ford
- December 14 & 15: ASWC #7 in (Switzerland) St. Moritz
  - Women's super-G winner: (Italy) Sofia Goggia
  - Women's parallel slalom winner: (Slovakia) Petra Vlhová
- December 14 & 15: ASWC #8 in (France) Val-d'Isère #1
  - Men's slalom winner: (France) Alexis Pinturault
- December 17: ASWC #9 in (France) Courchevel
  - Women's giant slalom winner: (Italy) Federica Brignone
- December 18 – 21: ASWC #10 in (Italy) Val Gardena
  - Men's super-G winner: (Austria) Vincent Kriechmayr
- December 19 – 22: ASWC #11 in (France) Val-d'Isère #2
  - Here alpine combined and downhill events was cancelled.
- December 22 & 23: ASWC #12 in (Italy) Alta Badia
  - Men's giant slalom winner: (Norway) Henrik Kristoffersen
  - Men's parallel giant slalom winner: (Norway) Rasmus Windingstad
- December 26 – 29: ASWC #13 in (Italy) Bormio
  - Downhill winners: (Italy) Dominik Paris (2 times)
  - Alpine combined winner: (France) Alexis Pinturault
- December 28 & 29: ASWC #14 in (Austria) Lienz
  - Women's giant slalom winner: (United States) Mikaela Shiffrin
  - Women's slalom winner: (United States) Mikaela Shiffrin

January 2020

- January 4 & 5: ASWC #15 in (Croatia) Zagreb
  - Slalom winners: (France) Clément Noël (m) / (Slovakia) Petra Vlhová (f)
- January 8: ASWC #16 in (Italy) Madonna di Campiglio
  - Slalom winners: (Switzerland) Daniel Yule
- January 9 – 12: ASWC #17 in (Austria) Altenmarkt-Zauchensee
  - Downhill: (Switzerland) Corinne Suter
  - Alpine combined: (Italy) Federica Brignone
- January 11 & 12: ASWC #18 in (Switzerland) Adelboden
  - Giant slalom: (Slovenia) Žan Kranjec
  - Slalom: (Switzerland) Daniel Yule
- January 14: ASWC #19 in (Austria) Flachau
  - Slalom: (Slovakia) Petra Vlhová
- January 14 – 19: ASWC #20 in (Switzerland) Wengen
- January 18 & 19: ASWC #21 in (Italy) Sestriere
- January 21 – 26: ASWC #22 in (Austria) Kitzbühel
- January 23 – 26: ASWC #23 in (Bulgaria) Bansko
- January 28: ASWC #24 in (Austria) Schladming
- January 29 – February 2: ASWC #25 in (Russia) Rosa Khutor Alpine Resort (will be relocated)
- January 30 – February 2: ASWC #26 in (Germany) Garmisch-Partenkirchen #1

February 2020

- February 6 – 9: ASWC #27 in (Germany) Garmisch-Partenkirchen #2
- February 8 & 9: ASWC #28 in (France) Chamonix
- February 12 – 16: ASWC #29 in (China) Yanqing District
- February 15 & 16: ASWC #30 in (Slovenia) Maribor
- February 20 – 23: ASWC #31 in (Switzerland) Crans-Montana
- February 22 & 23: ASWC #32 in (Japan) Yuzawa Naeba
- February 29 & March 1: ASWC #33 in (Italy) La Thuile
- February 29 & March 1: ASWC #34 in (Austria) Hinterstoder

March 2020

- March 5 – 8: ASWC #35 in (Norway) Kvitfjell
- March 7 & 8: ASWC #36 in (Germany) Ofterschwang
- March 12 – 14: ASWC #37 in (Sweden) Åre ski resort
- March 14 & 15: ASWC #38 in (Slovenia) Kranjska Gora Ski Resort
- March 16 – 22: ASWC #39 (final) in (Italy) Cortina d'Ampezzo

=== 2019–20 FIS Masters Cup ===
- January 3 – 5: MC #1 in (Slovenia) Cerkno
  - Giant slalom winners:
    - (30-34 y) (Croatia) Christopher Jon Kaucic (m)
    - (35-39 y) (Italy) Andrea Zanei (m)
    - (40-44 y) (Austria) Doris Bergener (f), (Austria) Thomas Reisenbichler (m)
    - (45-49 y) (Austria) Bettina Digruber (f), (Czech Republic) David Horacek (m)
    - (50-54 y) (Germany) Karin Maier (f), (Austria) Klaus Gstinig (m)
    - (55-59 y) (Italy) Roberta Maria Persico (f), (Switzerland) Roberto Siorpaes (m)
    - (60-64 y) (Slovenia) Boza Torkar (f), (Italy) Lorenzo Ferrari (m)
    - (65-69 y) (Austria) Hermann Brandstaetter (m)
    - (70-74 y) (Austria) Markus Kerschbaumer (m)
    - (75-79 y) (Austria) Josef Kovak (m)
    - (80-84 y) (Austria) Leopold Gruber (m)
    - (85-99 y) (Austria) Gottfried Suppan (m)
  - Slalom winners:
    - (30-34 y) (Croatia) Christopher Jon Kaucic(m)
    - (35-39 y) (Italy) Andrea Zanei (m)
    - (40-44 y) (Austria) Doris Bergener (f), (Slovenia) Tadej Prebil(m)
    - (45-49 y) (Russia) Mariia Titova (f), (Slovenia) Peter Furlan (m)
    - (50-54 y) (Germany) Karin Maier (f), (Austria) Klaus Gstinig (m)
    - (55-59 y) (Czech Republic) Ivana Ohlschlegelova (f), (Switzerland) Roberto Siorpaes (m)
    - (60-64 y) (Austria) Brigitte Pirker (f), (Italy) Lorenzo Ferrari (m)
    - (65-69 y) (Austria) Elisabeth Kabusch (f), (Austria) Hermann Brandstaetter (m)
    - (70-74 y) (Italy) Anna Fabretto (f), (Austria) Markus Kerschbaumer (m)
    - (75-79 y) (Austria) Leo Maerzendorfer (m)
    - (80-84 y) (Italy) Bruno Pachner (m)
    - (85-99 y) (Austria) Gottfried Suppan (m)
- January 10 – 11: MC #2 in (Austria) Reiteralm
  - Giant slalom winners:
    - (30-34 y) (Austria) Rene Pongritz (m)
    - (35-39 y) (Austria) Monika Gstoettinger (f), (Italy) Andrea Zanei (m)
    - (40-44 y) (Austria) Doris Bergener (f), (Austria) Thomas Reisenbichler (m)
    - (45-49 y) (Austria) Bettina Digruber (f), (Austria) Hansjoerg Spitaler (m)
    - (50-54 y) (Austria) Anita Gstrein (f), (Austria) Otto Unterkofler (m)
    - (55-59 y) (Germany) Marianne Ascher (f), (Switzerland) Roberto Siorpaes (m)
    - (60-64 y) (Austria) Hermine Lindner (f), (Austria) Josef Fuchs (m)
    - (65-69 y) (Austria) Elisabeth Kabusch (f), (Austria) Harald Lipp (m)
    - (70-74 y) (Austria) Renate Abfalterer (f), (United States) Pepi Neubauer (m)
    - (75-79 y) (Germany) Traudl Gilger (f), (Austria) Josef Kovar (m)
    - (80-84 y) (Austria) Leopold Gruber (m)
    - (85-99 y) (Austria) Gottfried Suppan (m)
  - Super-G winners:
    - (30-34 y) (Austria) Rene Pongritz (m)
    - (35-39 y) (Austria) Monika Gstoettinger (f), (Austria) Stefan Mangard (m)
    - (40-44 y) (Austria) Doris Bergener (f), (Slovenia) Tadej Prebil(m)
    - (45-49 y) (Austria) Bettina Digruber (f), (Austria) Alfred Gruener (m)
    - (50-54 y) (Austria) Anita Gstrein (f), (Austria) Otto Unterkofler (m)
    - (55-59 y) (Germany) Marianne Ascher (f), (Switzerland) Roberto Siorpaes (m)
    - (60-64 y) (Austria) Hermine Lindner (f), (Austria) Josef Fuchs (m)
    - (65-69 y) (Austria) Elisabeth Kabusch (f), (Austria) Harald Lipp (m)
    - (70-74 y) (Austria) Renate Abfalterer (f), (United States) Markus Kerschbaumer (m)
    - (75-79 y) (Germany) Traudl Gilger (f), (Austria) Josef Kovar (m)
    - (80-84 y) (Austria) Leopold Gruber (m)
    - (85-99 y) (Austria) Gottfried Suppan (m)
- January 12 – 16: MC #3 in (Austria) Innsbruck
  - Giant slalom winners:
    - (30-34 y) (Austria) Rene Pongritz (m)
    - (35-39 y) (Spain) Cristina Caba (f), (Austria) Stefan Mangard (m)
    - (40-44 y) (Australia) Jasmina Dedic–Hagan (f), (Italy) Oskar Pramsohler (m)
    - (45-49 y) (Austria) Bettina Digruber (f), (Austria) Lukas Schranz (m)
    - (50-54 y) (Austria) Anita Gstrein (f), (Austria) Otto Unterkofler (m)
    - (55-59 y) (Germany) Marianne Ascher (f), (Switzerland) Roberto Siorpaes (m)
    - (60-64 y) (France) Muriel Jay (f), (Austria) Josef Fuchs (m)
    - (65-69 y) (Switzerland) Julia Scharer (f), (Austria) Klaus Netzer (m)
    - (70-74 y) (Austria) Renate Abfalterer (f), (United States) Pepi Neubauer (m)
    - (75-79 y) (Canada) Denyse Houde (f), (Austria) Michael Eberl (m)
    - (80-84 y) (Italy) Claudio Giovanardi (m)
    - (85-99 y) (Italy) Alberto Corsi (m)
  - Slalom winners:
    - (30-34 y) (Austria) Jun Leonhard Hauser (m)
    - (35-39 y) (Czech Republic) Olga Landerer (f), (Poland) Jakub Gajewski-Glodek (m)
    - (40-44 y) (Austria) Simona Hoellermann (f), (Italy) Gian Mauro Piatoni(m)
    - (45-49 y) (Finland) Hanna Savolainen (f), (Czech Republic) David Horacek (m)
    - (50-54 y) (Austria) Anita Gstrein (f), (Germany) Paul Bader (m)
    - (55-59 y) (Germany) Monika Hoerhager (f), (Norway) Tor Helge Gauteplass (m)
    - (60-64 y) (France) Muriel Jay (f), (France) Patrick Avenier (m)
    - (65-69 y) (Switzerland) Julia Schaerer (f), (France) Michel Lerat (m)
    - (70-74 y) (Italy) Annelesse Kuder (f), (Austria) Eduard Reich (m)
    - (75-79 y) (United States) Lilla Gidlow (f), (Italy) Achille Cattaneo (m)
    - (80-84 y) (Italy) Claudio Giovanardi (m)
    - (85-99 y) (Italy) Alberto Corsi (m)
- January 18 – 19: MC #4 in (Germany) Bischofswiesen – Götschen
  - Cancelled.
- January 24 – 26: MC #5 in (Croatia) Zagreb – Sljeme
- January 31 – February 2: MC #6 (United Kingdom) in (France) Châtel

=== 2019–2020 FIS Alpine Skiing European Cup ===
November 2019

- November 29 & 30: ECAS #1 in (Sweden) Funäsdalen #1
  - Slalom winner: (Sweden) Sara Rask
- November 29 & 30: ECAS #2 in (Norway) Trysil #1
  - Slalom winner: (Germany) Linus Strasser

December 2019

- December 2 & 3: ECAS #3 in (Sweden) Funäsdalen #2
  - Giant slalom winner: (Norway) Fabian Wilkens Solheim
- December 2 & 3: ECAS #4 in (Norway) Trysil #2
  - Slalom winner: (Germany) Jessica Hilzinger
- December 5 & 6: ECAS #5 in (Norway) Kvitfjell
  - Super-G winner: (Austria) Nadine Fest
  - Alpine combined winner: (Austria) Nadine Fest
- December 9 & 10: ECAS #6 in (Italy) Santa Caterina
  - Super-G winner: (Switzerland) Ralph Weber
  - Alpine combined winner: (France) Robin Buffet
- December 10 & 11: ECAS #7 in (Switzerland) St. Moritz
  - Super-G winner: (Sweden) Ida Dannewitz
- December 12: ECAS #8 in (Switzerland) Zinal
  - Super-G winner: (Italy) Alexandre Prast
- December 14 & 15: ECAS #9 in (Italy) Andalo
  - Giant slalom winner: (Norway) Marte Monsen
- December 16: ECAS #10 in (Italy) Val di Fassa
  - Slalom winner: (Italy) Tommaso Sala
- December 21: ECAS #11 in (Italy) Kronplatz
  - Slalom winner: (Switzerland) Charlotte Chable (f), (Switzerland) Marco Reymond (m)
  - Parallel slalom winner: (Sweden) Emelie Henning (f), (Austria) Pirmin Hacker (m)

January 2020

- January 5 & 6: ECAS #12 in (France) Vaujany
  - Slalom winner: (Germany) Anton Tremmel
- January 8 – 11: ECAS #13 in (Switzerland) Wengen
  - Downhill winner: (Switzerland) Stefan Rogentin
- January 17 & 18: ECAS #14 in (Austria) Zell am See
- January 18 & 19: ECAS #15 in (Austria) Kirchberg
- January 19 – 22: ECAS #16 in (Austria) St. Anton
- January 22 – 26: ECAS #17 in (France) Orcieres
- January 23 & 24: ECAS #18 in (Switzerland) Hasliberg
- January 28 & 29: ECAS #19 in (France) Meribel
- January 29 & 30: ECAS #20 in (France) Morzine
- January 31 & February 1: ECAS #21 in (Switzerland) Jaun

February 2020

- February 3 – 5: ECAS #22 in (Italy) Pila
- February 3 – 6: ECAS #23 in (Austria) Saalbach
- February 8 – 10: ECAS #24 in (Germany) Berchtesgaden
- February 12 – 14: ECAS #25 in (Italy) Sella Nevea
- February 12 – 16: ECAS #26 in (Switzerland) Crans-Montana
- February 19 – 21: ECAS #27 in (Italy) Sarntal
- February 20 & 21: ECAS #28 in (Slovakia) Jasná
- February 26 & 27: ECAS #29 in (Slovenia) Krvavec
- February 27 – March 1: ECAS #30 in (Norway) Kvitfjell
- February 29 – March 1: ECAS #31 in (Germany) Bad Wiessee

March 2020

- March 18: ECAS #32 in (Austria) Saalbach
- March 20 – 22: ECAS #33 in (Austria) Reiteralm

=== 2019–20 FIS Alpine Skiing European Cup ===
- Note: For the FIS page about these events, click here.
- November 2019
  - November 29 & 30: ECAS #1 in (Norway) Trysil
    - Men's slalom winners: (Germany) Linus Straßer (#1) / (Italy) Tommaso Sala (#2)
  - November 29 & 30: ECAS #2 in (Sweden) Funäsdalen #1
    - Women's giant slalom winners: (Sweden) Sara Rask ((2 times)
- December 2019
  - December 2 & 3: ECAS #3 in (Sweden) Funäsdalen #2
    - Women's slalom winners: (Germany) Jessica Hilzinger (2 times)
  - December 2 & 3: ECAS #4 in (Norway) Trysil #2
    - Men's giant slalom winners: (Norway) Fabian Wilkens Solheim (2 times)
  - December 5 & 6: ECAS #5 in (Norway) Kvitfjell #1
    - Women's super-G winner: (Austria) Nadine Fest
    - Women's alpine combined winner: (Austria) Nadine Fest
  - December 9 & 10: ECAS #6 in (Italy) Santa Caterina di Valfurva
    - Men's alpine combined winner: (France) Robin Buffet
    - Men's super-G winner: (Switzerland) Ralph Weber
  - December 10 & 11: ECAS #7 in (Switzerland) St. Moritz
    - Women's super-G winners: (Sweden) Ida Dannewitz (#1) / (France) Tessa Worley (#2)
  - December 12 & 13: ECAS #8 in (Switzerland) Zinal
    - Men's super-G winners: (Austria) Niklas Köck (#1) / (Italy) Alexander Prast (#2)
  - December 14 & 15: ECAS #9 in (Italy) Andalo
    - Women's giant slalom winners: (Norway) Marte Monsen (#1) / (Austria) Elisa Mörzinger (#2)
  - December 16: ECAS #10 in (Italy) Fassa Valley #1
    - Men's slalom winner: (Italy) Tommaso Sala
  - December 17 – 20: ECAS #11 in (Italy) Fassa Valley #2
    - Cancelled.
  - December 18: ECAS #12 in (Italy) Obereggen
    - Cancelled.
  - December 21: ECAS #13 in (Italy) Kronplatz
    - Parallel slalom winners: (Austria) Pirmin Hacker (m) / (Sweden) Emelie Henning (f)
- January 2020
  - January 5 & 6: ECAS #14 in (France) Vaujany
    - Men's slalom winners: (Germany) Anton Tremmel (#1) / (Italy) Federico Liberatore (#2)
  - January 8 – 11: ECAS #15 in (Switzerland) Wengen
    - Men's downhill winners: (Switzerland) Stefan Rogentin (#1) / (Italy) Davide Cazzaniga (#2)
  - January 17 & 18: ECAS #16 in (Austria) Zell am See
  - January 18 & 19: ECAS #17 in (Austria) Kirchberg in Tirol
  - January 19 – 22: ECAS #18 in (Austria) St Anton am Arlberg
  - January 22 – 26: ECAS #19 in (France) Orcières
  - January 23 & 24: ECAS #20 in (Switzerland) Melchsee-Frutt
  - January 28 & 29: ECAS #21 in (France) Méribel
  - January 29 & 30: ECAS #22 in (France) Morzine
  - January 31 & February 1: ECAS #23 in (Switzerland) Jaun
- February 2020
  - February 3 – 6: ECAS #24 in (Austria) Saalbach-Hinterglemm
  - February 4 – 8: ECAS #25 in France (location TBA)
  - February 8 & 9: ECAS #26 in (Germany) Berchtesgaden
  - February 12 – 14: ECAS #27 in (Italy) Sella Nevea
  - February 13 – 16: ECAS #28 in (Switzerland) Crans-Montana
  - February 19 & 20: ECAS #29 in (Italy) Sarntal
  - February 20 & 21: ECAS #30 in (Slovakia) Jasná
  - February 26 & 27: ECAS #31 in (Slovenia) Krvavec Ski Resort
  - February 27 – March 1: ECAS #32 in (Norway) Kvitfjell #2
  - February 29 & March 1: ECAS #33 in (Germany) Bad Wiessee
- March 2020
  - March 18 & 19: ECAS #34 in Austria (location TBA)
  - March 20 – 22: ECAS #35 (final) in (Austria) Reiteralm

=== 2019–20 FIS Alpine Skiing Nor-Am Cup ===
- Note: For the FIS page about these events, click here.
- November 19 – 22, 2019: SNAC #1 in (Colorado) Copper Mountain
  - Men's slalom winners: (United States) AJ Ginnis (#1) / (Canada) Asher Jordan (#2)
  - Women's slalom winners: (United States) Lila Lapanja (2 times)
- December 9 – 13, 2019: SNAC #2 in (Alberta) Lake Louise Ski Resort
  - Men's downhill winners: (Canada) Jeffrey Read (#1) / (Canada) Cameron Alexander
  - Women's downhill winners: (United States) Keely Cashman (#1) / (United States) Alix Wilkinson (#2)
  - Super-G winners: (Canada) James Crawford (m) / (United States) Keely Cashman (f)
- December 16 – 20, 2019: SNAC #3 in (Alberta) Nakiska
  - Alpine combined winners: (Canada) Jeffrey Read (m) / (United States) Keely Cashman (f)
  - Super-G winners: (Canada) Jeffrey Read (m) / (United States) Isabella Wright (f)
  - Men's giant slalom winners: (Netherlands) Maarten Meiners (#1) / 2nd is cancelled
  - Women's giant slalom winners: (United States) Foreste Peterson (#1) / 2nd is cancelled
  - Men's slalom winners: (Canada) Jeffrey Read (#1) / (United States) Benjamin Ritchie (#2)
  - Women's slalom winners: (Canada) Amelia Smart (#1) / (United States) Katie Hensien (#2)
- January 2 – 5: SNAC #4 in (Vermont) Burke Mountain Ski Area
  - Women's giant slalom winner: (Netherlands) Adriana Jelnikova (2 times)
  - Women's slalom winner: (United States) Nina O'Brien
  - Men's giant slalom winner: (Germany) Bastian Meisen
- January 6 – 8: SNAC #5 in (Vermont) Stowe Mountain Resort
  - Men's giant slalom winners: (Germany) Bastian Meisen (#1) / (Canada) Brodie Seger (#2)
  - Men's slalom winner: (United States) Benjamin Ritchie
- February 3 – 7: SNAC #6 in (Quebec) Mont-Édouard
- February 4 & 5: SNAC #7 in (Ontario) Georgian Peaks Club
- February 6 & 7: SNAC #8 in (Ontario) Osler Bluff Ski Club
- February 8: SNAC #9 in (Ontario) Craigleith Ski Club
- February 10 – 13: SNAC #10 in (New York (state)) Whiteface Mountain
- February 14: SNAC #11 in (New Jersey) National Winter Activity Center
- March 17 – 24: SNAC #12 (final) in (British Columbia) Panorama Mountain Village

=== 2019–20 FIS Alpine Skiing Far East Cup ===
- Note: For the FIS page about these events, click here.
- December 4 – 7, 2019: FEC #1 in (China) Wanlong Ski Resorts (Chongli District)
  - Men's slalom winners: (South Korea) Jung Dong-hyun (#1) / (Sweden) William Hansson (#2)
  - Women's slalom winners: (New Zealand) Piera Hudson (#1) / (Czech Republic) Martina Dubovská (#2)
  - Men's giant slalom winners: (Sweden) William Hansson (2 times)
  - Women's giant slalom winners: (New Zealand) Piera Hudson #1) / (Japan) Asa Ando (#2)
- December 10 & 11, 2019: FEC #2 in (China) Thaiwoo Ski Resort (Chongli District)
  - Men's giant slalom winners: (South Korea) Jung Dong-hyun (#1) / (Russia) Alexey Zhilin (#2)
  - Women's giant slalom winners: (Sweden) Hilma Loevblom (#1) / (New Zealand) Piera Hudson (#2)
- February 6 & 7: FEC #3 in (South Korea) Yongpyong Resort
- February 11 – 14: FEC #4 in (South Korea) Bears Town Resort
- February 29 – March 2: FEC #5 in (Japan) Engaru
- March 5 & 6: FEC #6 in (Japan) Akan
- March 19 – 26: FEC #7 (final) in (Russia) Yuzhno-Sakhalinsk

=== 2019 FIS Alpine Skiing Australia & New Zealand Cup ===
- Note: For the FIS page about these events, click here.
- August 19 – 23: A&NZ #1 in (Australia) Hotham Alpine Resort
  - Note: The men's slalom event was cancelled.
  - Women's slalom winners: (New Zealand) Piera Hudson (#1) / (France) Josephine Forni (#2)
  - Giant slalom winners: (Austria) Magnus Walch (m) / (United States) Storm Klomhaus (f)
- August 26 – September 2: A&NZ #2 in (New Zealand) Coronet Peak
  - Men's super-G winners: (Belgium) Armand Marchant (#1) / (Netherlands) Maarten Meiners (#2)
  - Women's super-G winner: (New Zealand) Alice Robinson (2 times)
  - Men's giant slalom winners: (Belgium) Sam Maes (#1) / (Switzerland) Marco Reymond (#2)
  - Women's giant slalom winners: (United States) Storm Klomhaus (#1) / (Austria) Chiara Mair (#2)
  - Men's slalom winners: (Switzerland) Marc Rochat (#1) / (Austria) Fabio Gstrein (#2)
  - Women's slalom winner: (United Kingdom) Alexandra Tilley (2 times)
- September 4 & 5: A&NZ #3 (final) in (New Zealand) Cardrona Alpine Resort
  - Giant slalom winners: (Austria) Magnus Walch (m) / (New Zealand) Piera Hudson (f)
  - Men's slalom winner: (Norway) Sebastian Foss-Solevåg

=== 2019 FIS Alpine Skiing South American Cup ===
- Note: For the FIS page about these events, click here.
- August 5 – 8: SAC #1 in (Argentina) Cerro Catedral
  - Giant slalom winners: (Spain) Alejandro Puente Tasias (m) / (Madagascar) Mialitiana Clerc (f)
  - Slalom winners: (Spain) Juan del Campo (m) / (Madagascar) Mialitiana Clerc (f)
- August 10 – 13: SAC #2 in (Argentina) El Bolsón
  - Slalom winners: (Spain) Juan del Campo (m) / (Madagascar) Mialitiana Clerc (f)
- August 15 & 16: SAC #3 in (Argentina) Chapelco
  - Giant slalom winners: (Spain) Alejandro Puente Tasias (m) / (Russia) Elena Yakovishina (f)
- September 9 – 12: SAC #4 in (Chile) El Colorado
  - Event cancelled.
- September 16 – 20: SAC #5 in (Argentina) Cerro Castor
  - Slalom winners: (France) Robin Buffet (m) / (France) Doriane Escane (f)
  - Giant slalom winners: (France) Thibaut Favrot (m) / (Switzerland) Lindy Etzensperger (f)
- September 23 – 28: SAC #6 in (Chile) Antillanca
  - Note: The super-G events were cancelled.
  - Giant slalom winners: (Chile) Andres Figueroa (m) / (Mexico) Sarah Schleper (f)
  - Slalom winners: (Switzerland) Lars Kuonen (m) / (Argentina) Macarena Simari Birkner (f)
- October 2 – 6: SAC #7 (final) in (Chile) Corralco
  - Men's downhill winners: (Chile) Henrik von Appen (#1) / (Argentina) Cristian Javier Simari Birkner (#2 & #3)
  - Women's downhill winner: (Russia) Elena Yakovishina (3 times)
  - Men's alpine combined winners: (Argentina) Cristian Javier Simari Birkner (#1) / (Chile) Henrik von Appen (#2)
  - Women's alpine combined winner: (Russia) Elena Yakovishina (2 times)
  - Men's super-G winner: (Chile) Henrik von Appen (3 times)
  - Women's super-G winner: (Russia) Elena Yakovishina (3 times)

=== 2019 FIS Grass skiing Events ===
World Grass Skiing Championships

- July 30 – August 4: 2019 World Junior Grass Skiing Championships in (Czech Republic) Štítná nad Vláří-Popov
  - Giant slalom winners: (Czech Republic) Martin Bartak (m) / (Japan) Chisaki Maeda (f)
  - Super-G winners: (Czech Republic) Martin Bartak (m) / (Japan) Chisaki Maeda (f)
  - Super combined winners: (Czech Republic) Filip Machu (m) / (Japan) Chisaki Maeda (f)
  - Slalom winners: (Czech Republic) Jan Borak (m) / (Japan) Chisaki Maeda (f)
- August 13 – 18: 2019 World Grass Skiing Championships in (Switzerland) Marbachegg
  - Super combined winners: (Italy) Edoardo Frau (m) / (Japan) Chisaki Maeda (f)
  - Giant slalom winners: (Switzerland) Stefan Portmann (m) / (Japan) Chisaki Maeda (f)
  - Slalom winners: (Switzerland) Mirko Hueppi (m) / (Japan) Chisaki Maeda (f)
  - Super-G winners: (Italy) Edoardo Frau (m) / (Japan) Chisaki Maeda (f)

2019 FIS Grass Skiing World Cup

- Note: For the FIS page about these events, click here.
- June 15 & 16: GSWC #1 in (Austria) Rettenbach
  - Giant slalom winners: (Czech Republic) Martin Bartak (m) / (Austria) Jacqueline Gerlach (f)
  - Super combined winners: (Italy) Edoardo Frau (m) / (Austria) Jacqueline Gerlach (f)
  - Super-G winners: (Czech Republic) Martin Bartak (m) / (Czech Republic) Adela Kettnerova (f)
- June 29 & 30: GSWC #2 in (Czech Republic) Předklášteří
  - Men's giant slalom winner: (Czech Republic) Martin Bartak (2 times)
  - Women's giant slalom winner: (Austria) Jacqueline Gerlach (2 times)
- July 6 & 7: GSWC #3 in (Italy) Cortina d'Ampezzo
  - Men's slalom winner: (Italy) Lorenzo Dante Marco Gritti (2 times)
  - Women's slalom winners: (Austria) Jacqueline Gerlach (#1) / (Czech Republic) Alena Vesela (#2)
- August 25 – 27: GSWC #4 in (Iran) Dizin
  - Giant slalom winners: (Czech Republic) Martin Bartak (m) / (Austria) Jacqueline Gerlach (f)
  - Super-G winners: (Czech Republic) Martin Bartak (m) / (Austria) Jacqueline Gerlach (f)
  - Super combined winners: (Italy) Edoardo Frau (m) / (Austria) Jacqueline Gerlach (f)
  - Slalom winners: (Italy) Lorenzo Dante Marco Gritti (m) / (Austria) Jacqueline Gerlach (f)
- September 12 – 15: GSWC #5 (final) in (Italy) Schilpario
  - Super combined winners: (Czech Republic) Martin Bartak (m) / (Austria) Jacqueline Gerlach (f)
  - Slalom winners: (Switzerland) Mirko Hueppi (m) / (Austria) Jacqueline Gerlach (f)
  - Giant slalom winners: (Switzerland) Stefan Portmann (m) / (Austria) Jacqueline Gerlach (f)
  - Super-G winners: (Italy) Mattia Arrigoni (m) / (Austria) Jacqueline Gerlach (f)

2019 FIS Grass Skiing Junior Cup

- Note: For the FIS page about these events, click here.
- May 25 & 26: GSJC #1 in (Slovakia) Piešťany
  - Men's slalom winner: (Czech Republic) Martin Bartak (2 times)
  - Women's slalom winner: (Czech Republic) Sarka Abrahamova (2 times)
- May 31 – June 2: GSJC #2 in (Switzerland) Marbachegg
  - Note: The super combined & the super-G events here was cancelled.
  - Slalom winners: (Italy) Nicolo Schiavetti (m) / (Slovakia) Vanesa Drahovska (f)
  - Giant slalom winners: (Czech Republic) Martin Bartak (m) / (Czech Republic) Sarka Abrahamova (f)
- June 21 – 23: GSJC #3 in (Austria) Schwarzenbach-Sankt Veit an der Gölsen
  - Super combined winners: (Czech Republic) Martin Bartak (m) / (Germany) Julia Jaehnigen (f)
  - Super-G winners: (Czech Republic) Martin Bartak (m) / (Czech Republic) Alena Vesela (f)
  - Giant slalom winners: (Czech Republic) Martin Bartak (m) / (Czech Republic) Alena Vesela (f)
  - Slalom winners: (Czech Republic) Martin Bartak (m) / (Slovakia) Nikola Fricova (f)
- August 22 – 24: GSJC #4 (final) in (Iran) Dizin
  - Giant slalom winners: (Italy) Nicolo Schiavetti (m) / (f)
  - Slalom winners: (Italy) Filippo Zamboni (m) / (f)
  - Super combined winners: (Italy) Filippo Zamboni (m) / (f)
  - Super-G winners: (Italy) Filippo Zamboni (m) / (Czech Republic) Sarka Abrahamova (f)

== Biathlon ==
=== International biathlon championships and Winter Youth Olympics ===
- January 11 – 15: Biathlon at the 2020 Winter Youth Olympics in (France) Prémanon
- Boys' Events
  - sprint winner: (gold) (Poland) Marcin Zawół; (silver) (Russia) Denis Irodov; (bronze) (Norway) Vegard Thon;
  - individual winner: (gold) (Russia) Oleg Domichek (silver) (Austria) Lucas Haslinger; (bronze) (France) Mathieu Garcia;
- Girls'Events
  - sprint: (gold) (Russia) Alena Mokhova (silver) (Russia) Anastasiia Zenova; (bronze) (Austria) Anna Andexer;
  - individual: (gold) (Russia) Alena Mokhova (silver) (France) Jeanne Richard; (bronze) (Belarus) Yuliya Kavaleuskaya;
- Mixed Events
  - Single mixed relay: (gold) France; (silver) Italy; (bronze) Sweden;
  - Mixed relay: (gold) Italy; (silver) Russia; (bronze) France;
- August 21 – 25, 2019: 2019 IBU Summer Biathlon World Championships in (Belarus) Minsk-Raubichi
  - Men's 20 km individual winner: (Bulgaria) Krasimir Anev
  - Women's 15 km individual winner: (Sweden) Hanna Öberg
  - Pursuit #1 winners: (Norway) Tarjei Bø (m) / (Russia) Ekaterina Yurlova-Percht (f)
  - Pursuit #2 winners: (Slovakia) Martin Otčenáš (m) / (China) Zhang Yan
  - sprint #1 winners: (Norway) Tarjei Bø (m) / (Sweden) Mona Brorsson (f)
  - sprint #2 winners: (South Korea) Timofey Lapshin (m) / (Russia) Ekaterina Glazyrina & (Czech Republic) Lucie Charvátová (f)
  - Super-sprint winners: (South Korea) Timofey Lapshin (m) / (Ukraine) Valentyna Semerenko (f)
  - Juniors sprint winners: (Belarus) Dzmitry Lazouski (m) / (China) Yuanmeng Chu (f)
  - Juniors Pursuit winners: (Belarus) Dzmitry Lazouski (m) / (China) Yuanmeng Chu (f)
  - Juniors super-sprint winners: (Belarus) Mikita Labastau (m) / (Russia) Valeriia Vasnetcova (f)
- January 27 – February 2: 2020 IBU Youth/Junior World Championships in (Switzerland) Lenzerheide
- February 12 – 23: Biathlon World Championships 2020 in (Italy) Antholz-Anterselva
- February 24 – March 1: 2020 IBU Open European Championships in (Estonia) Otepää
- March 9 – 15: 2020 IBU Junior Open European Championships in (Austria) Hochfilzen

=== 2019–20 Biathlon World Cup ===
- November 29 – December 8, 2019: BWC #1 in (Sweden) Östersund
  - Men's 10 km sprint winner: (Norway) Johannes Thingnes Bø
  - Women's 7.5 km sprint winner: (Italy) Dorothea Wierer
  - Men's 20 km individual winner: (France) Martin Fourcade
  - Women's 15 km individual winner: (France) Justine Braisaz
- December 12 – 15, 2019: BWC #2 in (Austria) Hochfilzen
  - Men's 10 km sprint winner: (Norway) Johannes Thingnes Bø
  - Women's 7.5 km sprint winner: (Italy) Dorothea Wierer
  - Men's 12.5 km Pursuit winner: (Norway) Johannes Thingnes Bø
  - Women's 10 km Pursuit winner: (Norway) Tiril Eckhoff
- December 16 – 22, 2019: BWC #3 in (France) Annecy-Le Grand-Bornand
  - Men's 10 km sprint winner: (Germany) Benedikt Doll
  - Women 7.5 km sprint winner: (Norway) Tiril Eckhoff
  - Men's 12.5 km Pursuit winner: (Norway) Johannes Thingnes Bø
  - Women's 10 km Pursuit winner: (Norway) Tiril Eckhoff
  - Men's 15 km Mass Start winner: (Norway) Johannes Thingnes Bø
  - Women's 12.5 km Mass Start winner: (Norway) Tiril Eckhoff
- January 6 – 12: BWC #4 in (Germany) Oberhof
  - Women 7.5 km sprint winner: (Norway) Marte Olsbu Røiseland
  - Men's 10 km sprint winner: (France) Martin Fourcade
  - Women's 12.5 km Mass Start winner: (Finland) Kaisa Mäkäräinen
  - Men's 15 km Mass Start winner: (France) Martin Fourcade
- January 13 – 19: BWC #5 in (Germany) Ruhpolding
- January 20 – 26: BWC #6 in (Slovenia) Pokljuka
- March 2 – 8: BWC #7 in (Czech Republic) Nové Město na Moravě
- March 9 – 15: BWC #8 in (Finland) Kontiolahti
- March 16 – 22: BWC #9 (final) in (Norway) Oslo-Holmenkollen

=== 2019–20 IBU Cup ===
- November 25 – December 1, 2019: IBU Cup #1 in (Norway) Sjusjøen
  - Men's 10 km sprint winners: (Germany) Lucas Fratzscher (#1) / (Norway) Fredrik Gjesbakk (#2)
  - Women's 7.5 km sprint winners: (Norway) Karoline Erdal (#1) / (Russia) Irina Starykh (#2)
  - Pursuit winners: (Germany) Philipp Nawrath (m) / (Sweden) Elisabeth Högberg (f)
- December 9 – 15, 2019: IBU Cup #2 in (Italy) Ridnaun-Val Ridanna
  - Super-sprint winners: (Norway) Lars Helge Birkeland (m) / (Sweden) Ingela Andersson (f)
  - sprint winners: (Belarus) Maksim Varabei (m) / (Sweden) Johanna Skottheim (f)
  - Mass Start winners: (Norway) Lars Helge Birkeland (m) / (Russia) Anastasiia Porshneva (f)
- December 16 – 21, 2019: IBU Cup #3 in (Austria) Obertilliach
  - Men's 15 km individual winner: (Ukraine) Serhiy Semenov
  - Women's 12.5 km individual winner: (Germany) Stefanie Scherer
  - sprint winners: (Norway) Aleksander Fjeld Andersen (m) / (Sweden) Johanna Skottheim (f)
  - Single Mixed relay winners: Germany (Stefanie Scherer & Lucas Fratzscher)
- January 6 – 12: IBU Cup #4 in (Slovakia) Osrblie
  - Women's 12.5 km individual winner: (Russia) Ekaterina Glazyrina
  - Men's 15 km individual winner: (Norway) Endre Strømsheim
  - Women's 7.5 km sprint winner: (Russia) Evgeniya Pavlova
  - Men's 10 km sprint winner: (Germany) Philipp Nawrath
- January 13 – 18: IBU Cup #5 in (Poland) Duszniki-Zdrój
- February 3 – 9: IBU Cup #6 in (Germany) Arber
- February 10 – 15: IBU Cup #7 in (Italy) Martell-Val Martello
- March 2 – 8: IBU Cup #8 (final) in (Belarus) Minsk-Raubichi

=== 2019–20 IBU Junior Cup ===
- December 9 – 15, 2019: IBUJC #1 in (Slovenia) Pokljuka
  - Men's 15 km individual winner: (Switzerland) Niklas Hartweg
  - Women's 12.5 km individual winner: (Germany) Lisa Maria Spark
  - Men's 10 km sprint winner: (Italy) Didier Bionaz
  - Women's 7.5 km sprint winner: (Switzerland) Amy Baserga
  - Single Mixed relay winners: France (Paula Botet & Sebastien Mahon)
  - 4x6 Mixed relay winners: Switzerland (Lea Meier, Amy Baserga, Laurin Fravi, Niklas Hartweg)
- December 16 – 21, 2019: IBUJC #2 in (Italy) Martell-Val Martello
  - Men's 12.5 km Pursuit winner: (Italy) Tommaso Giacomel
  - Women's 10 km Pursuit winner: (Switzerland) Amy Baserga
  - Men's 10 km sprint winner: (Switzerland) Niklas Hartweg
  - Women's 7.5 km sprint winner: (Poland) Daria Gembicka
  - Single Mixed relay winners: Switzerland (Niklas Hartweg & Lea Meier)
  - 4x7.5 Mixed relay winners: France (Sebastien Mahon, Guillaume Desmus, Laura Boucaud, Paula Botet)
- March 2 – 8: IBUJC #3 (final) in (Germany) Arber

== Cross-country skiing ==
=== International cross-country events and Winter Youth Olympics ===
- January 18 – 22: Cross-country skiing at the 2020 Winter Youth Olympics in (Switzerland) Le Brassus
- February 28 – March 8: Part of the 2020 Nordic Junior World Ski Championships in (Germany) Oberwiesenthal

=== 2019–20 FIS Cross-Country World Cup ===
- Note: For the FIS page about these events, click here.
- November 29 – December 1, 2019: CCWC#1 in (Finland) Ruka
  - Men's overall standing winner: (Norway) Johannes Høsflot Klæbo
  - Women's overall standing winner: (Norway) Therese Johaug
- December 7 & 8, 2019: CCWC #2 in Lillehammer
  - Skiathlon winners: (Russia) Alexander Bolshunov (m) / (Norway) Therese Johaug (f)
  - relay 4x5 km winners: Russia (Ivan Yakimushkin, Evgeniy Belov, Ilia Poroshkin, Sergey Ustiugov) (m) / Norway (Maiken Caspersen Falla, Astrid Uhrenholdt Jacobsen, Therese Johaug, Heidi Weng) (f)
- December 14 & 15, 2019: CCWC #3 in (Switzerland) Davos
  - Men's 15 km freestyle winner: (Norway) Simen Hegstad Krüger
  - Women's 10 km freestyle winner: (Norway) Therese Johaug
  - sprint freestyle winners: (Norway) Johannes Høsflot Klæbo (m) / (Sweden) Linn Svahn (f)
- December 21 & 22, 2019: CCWC #4 in (Slovenia) Planica
  - sprint freestyle winners: (France) Lucas Chanavat (m) / (Sweden) Jonna Sundling (f)
  - Team sprint winners: Norway (Sindre Bjørnestad Skar & Erik Valnes) (m) / Sweden (Maja Dahlqvist & Linn Svahn) (f)
- December 28, 2019 – January 5: CCWC#5 in (Switzerland) Lenzerheide, (Italy) Toblach and (Italy) Fiemme Valley
  - Men's overall standing winner: (Russia) Alexander Bolshunov
  - Women's overall standing winner: (Norway) Therese Johaug
- January 11 & 12: CCWC #6 in (Germany) Dresden
  - sprint freestyle winners: (France) Lucas Chanavat (m) / (Sweden) Linn Svahn (f)
  - Team sprint winners: France (Renaud Jay & Lucas Chanavat) (m) / Sweden (Maja Dahlqvist & Linn Svahn) (f)
- January 18 & 19: CCWC #7 in (Czech Republic) Nové Město na Moravě
- January 25 & 26: CCWC #8 in (Germany) Oberstdorf
- February 8 & 9: CCWC #9 in (Sweden) Falun
- February 15 – 25: CCWC#10 in (Sweden) Östersund, (Sweden) Åre, (Norway) Meråker and (Norway) Trondheim
- February 29 & March 1: CCWC #11 in (Finland) Lahti
- March 4: CCWC #12 in (Norway) Drammen
- March 7 & 8: CCWC #13 in (Norway) Oslo
- March 14 – 17: CCWC#14 in (Canada) Quebec City and (United States) Minneapolis
- March 20 – 22: CCWC #15 (final) in (Canada) Canmore

=== 2019–20 FIS Cross-Country Skiing Alpen Cup ===
- Note: For the FIS page about these events, click here.
- December 7 & 8, 2019: CCSAC #1 in (Slovenia) Pokljuka
  - Men's 1.5 sprint freestyle winner: (Italy) Michael Hellweger
  - Women's 1.2 sprint freestyle winner: (Slovenia) Katja Višnar
  - Men's 15 km freestyle winner: (France) Hugo Lapalus
  - Women's 10 km freestyle winner: (Italy) Elisa Brocard
- December 19 – 21, 2019: CCSAC #2 in (Austria) Sankt Ulrich am Pillersee
  - 1.1 km sprint freestyle winners: (France) Jules Chappaz (m) / (Germany) Coletta Rydzek (f)
  - Men's 15 km Classic winner: (Italy) Dietmar Nöckler
  - Women's 10 km Classic winner: (Italy) Ilaria Debertolis
  - 10 km freestyle winners: (France) Jules Chappaz (m) / (Czech Republic) Petra Nováková (f)
- January 4 & 5: CCSAC #3 in (Switzerland) Campra
- January 18 & 19: CCSAC #4 in (Italy) Pragelato
- February 7 – 9: CCSAC #5 in (Italy) Piancavallo-Aviano
- March 20 – 22: CCSAC #6 (final) in (Germany) Zwiesel

=== 2019–20 FIS Cross-Country Skiing Eastern Europe Cup ===
- Note: For the FIS page about these events, click here.
- November 12 – 14, 2019: EEC #1 in (Kazakhstan) Shchuchinsk
  - 1.5 km Classic winners: (Russia) Andrey Parfenov (m) / (Belarus) Anastasia Kirillova (f)
  - Men's 10 km Classic winner: (Russia) Ermil Vokuev
  - Women's 5 km Classic winner: (Belarus) Anastasia Kirillova
  - Men's 10 km freestyle winner: (Kazakhstan) Vitaliy Pukhkalo
  - Women's 5 km freestyle winner: (Russia) Ekaterina Smirnova
- November 29 – December 3, 2019: EEC #2 in (Russia) Vershina Tea
  - 1.5 km Classic winners: (Russia) Sergey Ardashev (m) / (Russia) Yevgeniya Shapovalova (f)
  - Men's 15 km freestyle winner: (Russia) Alexey Vitsenko
  - Women's 10 km freestyle winner: (Russia) Alena Perevozchikova
  - 1.5 km freestyle winners: (Russia) Andrey Krasnov (m) / (Russia) Hristina Matsokina (f)
  - Men's 15 km Classic winner: (Russia) Ivan Kirillov
  - Women's 10 km Classic winner: (Russia) Yevgeniya Shapovalova
- December 25 – 29, 2019: EEC #3 in (Russia) Krasnogorsk #1
  - Event cancelled.
- January 16 – 19: EEC #4 in (Belarus) Minsk-Raubichi
- February 7 – 9: EEC #5 in (Russia) Krasnogorsk #2
- February 23: EEC #6 in (Russia) Moscow
- February 26 – March 1: EEC #7 (final) in (Russia) Kononovskaya

=== 2019–20 FIS Cross-Country Skiing US super Tour ===
- Note: For the FIS page about these events, click here.
- December 14 & 15, 2019: UST #1 in (Idaho) Lake Creek Nordic Center
  - 1.2 km Classic winners: (Alaska) Tyler Kornfield (m) / (Vermont) Katharine Ogden
  - Men's 15 km freestyle winner: (Michigan) Ian Torchia
  - Women's 10 km freestyle winner: (Finland) Riitta-Liisa Roponen
- January 24 – 26: UST #2 in (Vermont) Craftsbury Outdoor Center
- February 16 & 17: UST #3 in (Minnesota) Theodore Wirth Park (Minneapolis)
- February 19 – 22: UST #4 (final) in (Wisconsin) Cable-Hayward

=== 2019–20 FIS Cross-Country Skiing Nor-Am Cup ===
- Note: For the FIS page about these events, click here.
- December 6 – 8, 2019: SNAC #1 in (Alberta) Canmore Nordic Centre Provincial Park
  - 1.3 km freestyle winners: (Canada) Jesse Cockney (m) / (Germany) Julia Richter (f)
  - Men's 10 km Classic winner: (United States) Zak Ketterson
  - Women's 5 km Classic winner: (United States) Katharine Ogden
  - Men's 15 km freestyle winner: (United States) Benjamin Lustgarten
  - Women's 10 km freestyle winner: (United States) Caitlin Compton Gregg
- December 13 – 15, 2019: SNAC #2 in (Quebec) Nakkertok Nordic Ski Centre
  - Men's 1.4 sprint Classic winner: (Canada) Bob Thompson
  - Women's 1.3 sprint Classic winner: (Canada) Katherine Stewart-Jones
  - Men's 10 km freestyle winner: (Canada) Antoine Cyr
  - Women's 5 km freestyle winner: (Canada) Katherine Stewart-Jones
  - Men's 10 km Classic winner: (Canada) Evan Palmer-Charrette
  - Women's 10 km Classic winner: (Canada) Katherine Stewart-Jones
- January 30 – February 2: SNAC #3 (final) in (Quebec) Mont-Sainte-Anne

=== 2019–20 FIS Cross-Country Skiing Slavic Cup ===
- Note: For the FIS page about these events, click here.
- December 7 & 8, 2019: SSC #1 in (Slovakia) Štrbské Pleso #1
  - Cancelled.
- December 14 & 15, 2019: SSC #2 in (Poland) Zakopane
  - Cancelled.
- February 1 & 2: SSC #3 in (Slovakia) Štrbské Pleso #2
- March 21: SSC #4 in (Slovakia) Kremnica-Skalka
- March 22: SSC #5 (final) in (Slovakia) Skalka nad Váhom

=== 2019–20 FIS Cross-Country Skiing Far East Cup ===
- Note: For the FIS page about these events, click here.
- December 16 & 17, 2019: FEC #1 in (South Korea) Alpensia Cross-Country and Biathlon Centre #1
  - Men's 10 km Classic winner: (Russia) Mikhail Sosnin
  - Women's 5 km Classic winner: (Russia) Anastasiya Dubova
  - Men's 10 km freestyle winner: (Russia) Mikhail Sosnin
  - Women's 5 km freestyle winner: (Russia) Anastasiya Dubova
- December 25 – 27, 2019: FEC #2 in (Japan) Otoineppu
  - Men's 10 km Classic winner: (Japan) Naoto Baba
  - Women's 5 km Classic winner: (Japan) Masako Ishida
  - Men's 10 km freestyle winner: (Japan) Naoto Baba
  - Women's 5 km freestyle winner: (Japan) Masako Ishida
- January 6 – 8: FEC #3, #4, & #5 in (Japan) Sapporo
- January 19 & 20: FEC #6 in (South Korea) Alpensia Cross-Country and Biathlon Centre #2
- March 20 – 22: FEC #7 (final) in (Japan) Shiramine

=== 2019–20 FIS Cross-Country Skiing Scandinavian Cup ===
- Note: For the FIS page about these events, click here.
- December 13 – 15, 2019: CCSC #1 in (Finland) Vuokatti
  - 1.2 km Classic winners: (Norway) Thomas Helland Larsen (m) / (Norway) Silje Øyre Slind (f)
  - Men's 30 km Classic Mst winner: (Norway) Eirik Sverdrup Augdal
  - Women's 20 km Classic Mst winner: (Sweden) Maria Nordström
  - Men's 15 km freestyle winner: (Norway) Jan Thomas Jenssen
  - Women's 10 km freestyle winner: (Norway) Julie Myhre
- January 3 – 5: CCSC #2 in (Norway) Nes Skianlegg
- March 13 – 15: CCSC #3 (final) in (Estonia) Otepää

=== 2020 FIS Cross-Country Skiing Balkan Cup ===
- Note: For the FIS page about these events, click here.
- January 20 & 21: BC #1 in (Serbia) Zlatibor
- January 25 & 26: BC #2 in (Greece) 3-5 Pigadia Ski Resort
- February 1 & 2: BC #3 in (Croatia) Ravna Gora
- February 25 & 26: BC #4 in (North Macedonia) Mavrovo
- February 29 & March 1: BC #5 in (Bosnia and Herzegovina) Dvorišta-Pale
- March 14 & 15: BC #6 (final) in (Turkey) Bolu-Gerede

=== 2019 FIS Cross-Country Skiing Australia & New Zealand Cup ===
- Note: For the FIS page about these events, click here.
- July 27 & 28: ANZC #1 in (Australia) Falls Creek
  - sprint classical winners: (Australia) Phillip Bellingham (m) / (Australia) Katerina Paul (f)
  - freestyle winners: (Australia) Phillip Bellingham (m) / (Australia) Casey Wright (f)
- August 17 & 18: ANZC #2 in (Australia) Perisher Valley
  - sprint freestyle winners: (Australia) Phillip Bellingham (m) / (Australia) Katerina Paul (f)
  - classical winners: (Australia) Phillip Bellingham (m) / (Australia) Casey Wright (f)
- September 3 – 5: ANZC #3 (final) in (New Zealand) Snow Farm
  - sprint classical winners: (Japan) Hiroyuki Miyazawa (m) / (United States) Jessie Diggins (f)
  - freestyle winners: (Japan) Tomoki Sato (m) / (United States) Jessie Diggins (f)
  - classical Mass Start winners: (Japan) Hiroyuki Miyazawa (m) / (United States) Jessie Diggins (f)

== freestyle skiing ==
=== 2020 Winter Youth Olympics (freestyle skiing) ===
- January 20 – 22: freestyle skiing at the 2020 Winter Youth Olympics in (Switzerland) Leysin & Villars-sur-Ollon

=== 2019–20 FIS freestyle Ski World Cup (Moguls and Aerials) ===
- Note: For the FIS page about these events, click here.
- December 7, 2019: MAWC #1 in (Finland) Ruka
  - Moguls winners: (Canada) Mikaël Kingsbury (m) / (France) Perrine Laffont (f)
- December 14 & 15, 2019: MAWC #2 in (China) Thaiwoo
  - Moguls winners: (Japan) Ikuma Horishima (m) / (France) Perrine Laffont (f)
  - Dual Moguls winners: (Canada) Mikaël Kingsbury (m) / (France) Perrine Laffont (f)
- December 21 & 22, 2019: MAWC #3 in (China) Shimao Lotus Mountain
  - Aerials #1 winners: (China) Qi Guangpu (m) / (China) Xu Mengtao (f)
  - Aerials #2 winners: (China) Qi Guangpu (m) / (China) Xu Mengtao (f)
  - Aerials Team winners: Russia
- January 25: MAWC #4 in (Canada) Mont Tremblant Resort
  - Moguls winners: (Canada) Mikaël Kingsbury (m) / (France) Perrine Laffont (f)
- January 31 & February 1: MAWC #5 in (Canada) Calgary
  - Moguls winners: (Canada) Mikaël Kingsbury (m) / (France) Perrine Laffont (f)
- February 6 – 8: MAWC #6 in (United States) Deer Valley
- February 15: MAWC #7 in (Georgia (country)) Tbilisi
  - Event cancelled.
- February 15: MAWC #7 in (Russia) Moscow
- February 22: MAWC #8 in (Belarus) Raubichi
- February 22 & 23: MAWC #9 in (Japan) Tazawako
- February 29 & March 1: MAWC #10 in (Kazakhstan) Almaty
- March 7 & 8: MAWC #11 in (Russia) Krasnoyarsk
- March 14 & 15: MAWC #12 (final) in (Sweden) Idre Fjäll

=== 2019–20 FIS Freestyle Skiing World Cup (Half-pipe, Big air, & slopestyle) ===
- Note: For the FIS page about these events, click here.
- September 6 & 7, 2019: HB&SWC #1 in (New Zealand) Cardrona Alpine Resort
  - Halfpipe winners: (United States) Birk Irving (m) / (China) Zhang Kexin (f)
- November 3, 2019: HB&SWC #2 in (Italy) Modena SKIPASS
  - Freeski Big Air winners: (United States) Alex Hall (m) / (Switzerland) Mathilde Gremaud (f)
- November 21 – 23, 2019: HB&SWC #3 in (Austria) Stubai Alps
  - Event cancelled.
- December 11 – 13, 2019: HB&SWC #4 in (United States) Copper Mountain
  - Halfpipe winners: (United States) Aaron Blunck (m) / (United Kingdom) Zoe Atkin (f)
- December 12 – 14, 2019: HB&SWC #5 in (China) Beijing
  - Big Air winners: (Norway) Birk Ruud (m) / (Norway) Johanne Killi (f)
- December 19 – 21, 2019: HB&SWC #6 in (China) Genting Resort Secret Garden
  - Halfpipe winners: (Canada) Noah Bowman (m) / (Russia) Valeriya Demidova (f)
- December 19 – 21, 2019: HB&SWC #7 in (United States) Atlanta
  - Big Air winners: (United States) Alex Hall (m) / (Switzerland) Mathilde Gremaud (f)
- January 3: HB&SWC #8 in (Germany) Düsseldorf
  - Event cancelled.
- January 9 – 11: HB&SWC #9 in (France) Font-Romeu
  - Freeski slopestyle winners: (Canada) Mark Hendrickson (m) / (France) Tess Ledeux (f)
- January 17 & 18: HB&SWC #10 in (Italy) Seiser Alm
  - Freeski slopestyle winners: (Norway) Birk Ruud (m) / (United States) Caroline Claire (f)
- January 29 – February 1: HB&SWC #11 in (United States) Mammoth Mountain Ski Area
  - Freeski slopestyle winners: (Switzerland) Andri Ragettli (m) / (Switzerland) Sarah Hoefflin (f)
  - Halfpipe winners: (United States) Aaron Blunk (m) / (Russia) Cassie Sharpe (f)
- February 12 – 15: HB&SWC #12 in (Canada) Calgary
- February 28 & 29: HB&SWC #13 in (Czech Republic) Deštne
- March 19 – 21: HB&SWC #14 (final) in (Switzerland) Silvaplana

=== 2019–20 FIS Freestyle Skiing World Cup (Ski cross) ===
- Note: For the FIS page about these events, click here.
- December 5 – 7, 2019: SCWC #1 in (France) Val Thorens
  - Ski Cross #1 winners: (Canada) Kevin Drury (m) / (Sweden) Sandra Näslund (f)
  - Ski Cross #2 winners: (Canada) Kristofor Mahler (m) / (Switzerland) Fanny Smith (f)
- December 12 – 14, 2019: SCWC #2 in (Austria) Montafon
  - Ski Cross winners: (Switzerland) Ryan Regez (m) / (Canada) Marielle Thompson (f)
- December 17, 2019: SCWC #3 in (Switzerland) Arosa
  - Ski Cross winners: (Canada) Kevin Drury (m) / (Canada) Marielle Thompson (f)
- December 20 – 22, 2019: SCWC #4 in (Italy) Innichen
  - Ski Cross #1 winners: (Canada) Kevin Drury (m) / (France) Marielle Berger Sabbatel (f)
  - Ski Cross #2 winners: (Switzerland) Joos Berry (m) / (Switzerland) Fanny Smith (f)
- January 17 & 18: SCWC #5 in (Canada) Nakiska
  - Ski Cross winners: (Canada) Reece Howden Drury (m) / (Sweden) Sandra Näslund (f)
- January 24 – 26: SCWC #6 in (Sweden) Idre Fjäll
  - Ski Cross #1 winners: (Switzerland) Ryan Regez (m) / (Switzerland) Fanny Smith (f)
  - Ski Cross #2 winners: (Germany) Daniel Bohnacker (m) / (Sweden) Sandra Näslund (f)
- January 31 & February 1: SCWC #7 in (France) Megève
  - Ski Cross winners: (Canada) Kevin Drury (m) / (Canada) Marielle Thompson (f)
- February 7 – 9: SCWC #8 in (Germany) Feldberg
- February 22 & 23: SCWC #9 in (Russia) Sunny Valley Ski Resort (Miass)
- February 28 – March 1: SCWC #10 in (China) Genting Resort Secret Garden
- March 14: SCWC #11 (final) in (Switzerland) Veysonnaz

=== 2019–20 FIS Freestyle Skiing European Cup ===
- Note: For the FIS page about these events, click here.
- November 23 & 24, 2019: FSEC #1 in (Austria) Pitztal
  - Ski Cross winners: (United States) Tyler Wallasch (m) / (Canada) Marielle Thompson (f)
- November 29 & 30, 2019: FSEC #2 in (Finland) Ruka
  - Aerials #1 winners: (Switzerland) Noé Roth (m) / (Australia) Laura Peel
  - Aerials #2 winners: (Russia) Ilya Burov (m) / (Kazakhstan) Zhanbota Aldabergenova (f)
- December 18 – 20, 2019: FSEC #3 in (France) Val Thorens
  - Ski Cross winners: (Austria) Frederic Berthold (m) / (Russia) Polina Ryabova (f)
- January 6 & 7: FSEC #4 in (Switzerland) Airolo
- January 10 & 11: FSEC #5 in (Switzerland) Prato (Leventina)
- January 24 & 25: FSEC #6 in (Switzerland) Lenk im Simmental
- January 28 & 29: FSEC #7 in (France) Châtel
- February 3 & 4: FSEC #8 in (France) Tignes
- February 7 & 8: FSEC #9 in (Czech Republic) Dolní Morava
- February 7 – 9: FSEC #10 in (Belarus) Raubichi
- February 8 & 9: FSEC #11 in (Sweden) Åre
- February 14 & 15: FSEC #12 in (Finland) Jyväskylä
- February 15 & 16: FSEC #13 in (Germany) Grasgehren
- February 19 & 20: FSEC #14 in (Russia) Krasnoe Ozero
- February 25 & 26: FSEC #15 in (Finland) Taivalkoski
- March 12 & 13: FSEC #16 in France (location TBA)
- March 21 & 22: FSEC #17 (final) in (Austria) Reiteralm

=== 2019–20 FIS Freestyle Skiing Nor-Am Cup ===
- Note: For the FIS page about these events, click here.
- December 20 & 21, 2019: FSNA #1 in (Colorado) Copper Mountain
  - Halfpipe #1 winners: (Canada) Andrew Longino (m) / (United Kingdom) Zoe Atkin (f)
  - Halfpipe #2 winners: (Canada) Andrew Longino (m) / (United Kingdom) Zoe Atkin (f)
- January 9 – 12: FSNA #2 in (Alberta) Canyon Ski Area
- January 20 – 23: FSNA #3 in (Alberta) Nakiska
- February 1 – 4: FSNA #4 in (Ontario) Calabogie Peaks
- February 5 – 7: FSNA #5 in (California) Mammoth Mountain Ski Area
- February 9 – 13: FSNA #6 in (Utah) Deer Valley
- March 3 – 6: FSNA #7 (final) in (Utah) Woodward – Park City

=== 2019 FIS Freestyle Skiing South American Cup ===
- Note: For the FIS page about these events, click here.
- August 2 – 4: SAC #1 in (Chile) La Parva #1
  - Note: The women's slopestyle events were cancelled.
  - Men's slopestyle winners: (Chile) Benjamin Garces (#1) / (United States) Luke Price (#2)
- August 30 – September 1: SAC #2 in (Chile) La Parva #2
  - Event cancelled.
- September 7 & 8: SAC #3 in (Argentina) Cerro Catedral
  - Note: The women's big air events were cancelled.
  - Men's Big Air winner: (Argentina) Nahuel Medrano (2 times)
- September 16 & 17: SAC #4 in (Chile) Pucón
  - Men's Ski Cross winner: (Chile) Joaquin Valdes (2 times)
  - Women's Ski Cross winner: (Canada) Antoinette Tansley (2 times)
- September 23 & 24: SAC #5 (final) in (Argentina) Chapelco
  - Slopestyle winners: (Argentina) Mateo Bonacalza (m) / (Argentina) Paloma Leyton (f)

=== 2019 FIS Freestyle Skiing Australia & New Zealand Cup ===
- Note: For the FIS page about these events, click here.
- August 7 – 9: ANCFS #1 in (Australia) Perisher Ski Resort #1
  - Note: The slopestyle events were cancelled.
  - Men's Big Air winners: (New Zealand) Jackson Wells (#1) / (New Zealand) Ben Barclay (#2)
  - Women's Big Air winners: (China) CHENG Jiahui (#1) / (China) YANG Shuorui (#2)
- August 14 – 17: ANCFS #2 in (New Zealand) Cardrona Alpine Resort #1
  - Slopestyle winners: (Japan) Taisei Yamamoto (m) / (China) Eileen Gu (f)
- August 25 – September 2: ANCFS #3 in (New Zealand) Cardrona Alpine Resort #2
  - Halfpipe winners: (China) Mao Bingqiang (m) / (China) Eileen Gu (f)
  - Slopestyle winners: (New Zealand) Ben Barclay (m) / (China) Eileen Gu (f)
- August 27 & 28: ANCFS #4 in (Australia) Perisher Ski Resort #2
  - Men's Moguls winners: (Japan) Ikuma Horishima (#1) / (Canada) Mikaël Kingsbury (#2)
  - Women's Moguls winner: (Australia) Jakara Anthony (2 times)
- August 31: ANCFS #5 in (Australia) Mount Buller Alpine Resort
  - Dual Moguls winners: (Australia) Brodie Summers (m) / (Japan) Rino Yanagimoto (f)
- September 2 – 8: ANCFS #6 in (Australia) Hotham Alpine Resort
  - Men's Ski Cross winners: (Canada) Zach Belczyk (2 times; #1) / (United States) Tyler Wallasch (#2) / (Canada) Brady Leman (#3)
  - Women's Ski Cross winners: (Canada) Marielle Thompson (3 times; #1) / (Australia) Sami Kennedy-Sim (#2)
- October 2: ANCFS #7 (final) in (New Zealand) Cardrona Alpine Resort #3
  - Halfpipe winners: (Japan) Toma Matsuura (m) / (Canada) Dillan Glennie (f)

== Nordic combined ==
=== 2020 Winter Youth Olympics (Nordic combined) ===
- January 18 – 22: Nordic combined at the 2020 Winter Youth Olympics in (France) Prémanon

=== International Nordic combined event ===
- February 28 – March 8: Part of the 2020 Nordic Junior World Ski Championships in (Germany) Oberwiesenthal

=== 2019–20 FIS Nordic combined World Cup ===
- Note: For the FIS page about these events, click here.
- November 28 – December 1, 2019: NCWC #1 in (Finland) Ruka
  - Men's individual winner #1: (Norway) Jarl Magnus Riiber (3 times)
  - Overall winner: (Norway) Jarl Magnus Riiber
- December 6 – 8, 2019: NCWC #2 in (Norway) Lillehammer
  - winner #1: (Norway) Jarl Magnus Riiber (2 times)
- December 20 – 22, 2019: NCWC #3 in (Austria) Ramsau am Dachstein
  - winner #1: (Germany) Vinzenz Geiger
  - winner #2: (Norway) Jarl Magnus Riiber
- January 9 – 12: NCWC #4 in (Italy) Fiemme Valley
- January 24 – 26: NCWC #5 in (Germany) Oberstdorf
- January 30 – February 2: NCWC #6 in (Austria) Seefeld in Tirol
- February 7 – 9: NCWC #7 in (Estonia) Otepää
- February 21 – 23: NCWC #8 in (Norway) Trondheim
- February 28 – March 1: NCWC #9 in (Finland) Lahti
- March 6 & 7: NCWC #10 in (Norway) Oslo
- March 13 – 15: NCWC #11 (final) in (Germany) Schonach im Schwarzwald

=== 2019–20 FIS Nordic combined Continental Cup ===
- Note: For the FIS page about these events, click here.
- December 12 – 15, 2019: CCNC #1 in (United States) Utah Olympic Park
  - winners #1: (Germany) Jakub Lange (m) / (United States) Tara Geraghty-Moats (f)
  - winners #2: (Germany) Jakub Lange (m) / (United States) Tara Geraghty-Moats (f)
  - Mass Start winners: (Germany) Jakub Lange (m) / (United States) Tara Geraghty-Moats (f)
- December 19 & 20, 2019: CCNC #2 in (Germany) Oberwiesenthal
  - Event Cancelled.
- January 17 – 19: CCNC #3 in (Germany) Klingenthal
- January 25 & 26: CCNC #4 in (Norway) Rena
- February 1 & 2: CCNC #5 in (Slovenia) Planica
- February 8 & 9: CCNC #6 in (Estonia) Otepää
- February 14 – 16: CCNC #7 in (Austria) Eisenerz
- March 7 & 8: CCNC #8 in (Finland) Lahti
- March 13 – 15: CCNC #9 (final) in (Russia) Nizhny Tagil

=== 2019–20 FIS Nordic combined Alpen Cup ===
- Note: For the FIS page about these events, click here.
- August 5, 2019: ACNC #1 in (Germany) Klingenthal
  - Women's individual winner: (Italy) Daniela Dejori
- August 9, 2019: ACNC #2 in (Germany) Bischofsgrün
  - Women's individual winner: (Italy) Daniela Dejori
- September 14 & 15, 2019: ACNC #3 in (Germany) Winterberg
  - Men's individual winner: (Austria) Stefan Rettenegger (2 times)
- September 21 & 22, 2019: ACNC #4 in (Italy) Predazzo-Fiemme Valley
  - Men's individual winners: (Germany) Nick Siegemund (#1) / (Austria) Stefan Rettenegger (#2)
  - Women's individual winner: (Austria) Lisa Hirner (2 times)
- December 21 & 22, 2019: ACNC #5 in (Austria) Seefeld in Tirol
  - Men's individual winners: (Austria) Fabio Obermeyr (#1) / (Austria) Manuel Einkemmer (#2)
  - Women's individual winners: (Austria) Annalena Slamik (#1) / (Austria) Lisa Hirner (f)
- January 11 & 12: ACNC #6 in (Germany) Schonach im Schwarzwald
- February 8 & 9: ACNC #7 in (Slovenia) Kranj
- February 22 & 23: ACNC #8 (final) in (Austria) Villach

=== 2019 FIS Nordic combined Grand Prix ===
- Note: For the FIS page about these events, click here.
- August 23 – 25: GPNC #1 in (Germany) Oberwiesenthal
  - individual winners: (Japan) Akito Watabe (m) / (United States) Tara Geraghty-Moats (f)
  - Team winners: Italy (Samuel Costa, Veronica Gianmoena, Annika Sieff, & Alessandro Pittin)
- August 27 & 28: GPNC #2 in (Germany) Klingenthal
  - Men's Mass Start winner: (Austria) Franz-Josef Rehrl
  - Women's individual winner: (United States) Tara Geraghty-Moats
- August 30 – September 1: GPNC #3 in (Germany) Oberhof
  - Men's individual winners: (Austria) Franz-Josef Rehrl (#1) / (France) Antoine Gérard (#2)
  - Women's individual winners: (United States) Tara Geraghty-Moats (#1) / (Norway) Gyda Westvold Hansen (#2)
- September 3 & 4: GPNC #4 in (Austria) Tschagguns
  - Men's individual winner: (Germany) Fabian Rießle
- September 6 – 8: GPNC #5 (final) in (Slovenia) Planica
  - Men's individual winner: (Norway) Jarl Magnus Riiber (2 times)

== Ski jumping ==
=== 2020 Winter Youth Olympics (Ski jumping) ===
- January 19 – 22: Ski jumping at the 2020 Winter Youth Olympics in (France) Prémanon

=== International ski jumping events ===
- February 28 – March 8: Part of the 2020 Nordic Junior World Ski Championships in (Germany) Oberwiesenthal
- March 20 – 22: FIS Ski Flying World Championships 2020 in (Slovenia) Planica

=== 2019–20 Four Hills Tournament ===
- December 28 & 29, 2019: FHT #1 in (Germany) Oberstdorf
- December 31, 2019 & January 1: FHT #2 in (Germany) Garmisch-Partenkirchen
- January 3 & 4: FHT #3 in (Austria) Innsbruck
- January 5 & 6: FHT #4 (final) in (Austria) Bischofshofen

=== Raw Air 2020 ===
- March 6 – 8: RA #1 in (Norway) Oslo (SJWC #21)
- March 9 & 10: RA #2 in (Norway) Lillehammer (SJWC #22)
- March 11 & 12: RA #3 in (Norway) Trondheim (SJWC #23)
- March 13 – 15: RA #4 (final) in (Norway) Vikersund (SJWC #24)

=== 2019–20 FIS Ski Jumping World Cup ===
- Note: For the FIS page about these events, click here.
- November 2019
- November 22 – 24, 2019: SJWC #1 in (Poland) Wisła
  - winner: (Norway) Daniel-André Tande
  - Team winners: Austria (Philipp Aschenwald, Daniel Huber, Jan Hörl, Stefan Kraft)
- November 29 – December 1, 2019: SJWC #2 in (Finland) Ruka
  - Men's winners: (Norway) Daniel-André Tande (#1) / (2nd is cancelled)
- December 2019
- December 6 – 8, 2019: SJWC #3 in (Norway) Lillehammer
  - Women's winners: (Norway) Maren Lundby (2 times)
- December 6 – 8, 2019: SJWC #4 in (Russia) Nizhny Tagil #1
  - Men's winners: (Japan) Yukiya Satō (#1) / (Austria) Stefan Kraft (#2)
- December 13 – 15, 2019: SJWC #5 in (Germany) Klingenthal
  - winners: (Japan) Ryoyu Kobayashi (m) / (Austria) Chiara Hölzl (f)
  - Men's Team winners: Poland (Piotr Żyła, Jakub Wolny, Kamil Stoch, Dawid Kubacki)
- December 20 – 22, 2019: SJWC #6 in (Switzerland) Engelberg
  - Men's winners: (Poland) Kamil Stoch (#1) / (Japan) Ryoyu Kobayashi (#2)
- January 2020
- January 10 – 12: SJWC #7 in (Japan) Sapporo #1
- January 10 – 12: SJWC #8 in (Italy) Fiemme Valley
- January 16 – 19: SJWC #9 in (Japan) Zaō
- January 17 – 19: SJWC #10 in (Germany) Titisee-Neustadt
- January 24 – 26: SJWC #11 in (Romania) Râșnov #1
- January 24 – 26: SJWC #12 in (Poland) Zakopane
- January 31 – February 2: SJWC #13 in (Germany) Oberstdorf
- January 31 – February 2: SJWC #14 in (Japan) Sapporo #2
- February 2020
- February 7 – 9: SJWC #15 in (Austria) Hinzenbach
- February 7 – 9: SJWC #16 in (Germany) Willingen
- February 14 – 16: SJWC #17 in (Austria) Tauplitz-Bad Mitterndorf
- February 20 – 22: SJWC #18 in (Romania) Râșnov #2
- February 21 – 23: SJWC #19 in (Slovenia) Ljubno ob Savinji
- February 28 – March 1: SJWC #20 in (Finland) Lahti
- March 2020
- March 13 – 15: SJWC #25 in (Russia) Nizhny Tagil #2
- March 20 – 22: SJWC #26 in (Russia) Chaykovsky

=== 2019–20 FIS Ski Jumping Continental Cup ===
- Note: For the FIS page about these events, click here.
- July 2019
- July 5 & 6, 2019: SJCC #1 in (Slovenia) Kranj
  - Men's individual winner: (Russia) Evgeni Klimov (2 times)
- July 13 & 14, 2019: SJCC #2 in (Kazakhstan) Shchuchinsk
  - Men's individual winners: (Austria) Maximilian Lienher (#1) / (Japan) Keiichi Sato (#2)
  - Women's individual winner: (Norway) Gyda Westvold Hansen (2 times)
- August 2019
- August 8 & 9, 2019: SJCC #3 in (Poland) Szczyrk
  - Women's individual winner: (Austria) Marita Kramer (2 times)
- August 10 & 11, 2019: SJCC #4 in (Poland) Wisła
  - Men's individual winner: (Poland) Klemens Murańka (2 times)
- August 16 & 17, 2019: SJCC #5 in (Czech Republic) Frenštát pod Radhoštěm
  - Men's individual winners: (Norway) Joakim Aune (#1) / (Poland) Pawel Wasek (#2)
- August 31 & September 1, 2019: SJCC #6 in (Romania) Râșnov
  - Men's individual winner: (Slovenia) Rok Justin (2 times)
- September 2019
- September 14 & 15, 2019: SJCC #7 in (Norway) Lillehammer
  - Note: The second women's individual event was cancelled.
  - Men's individual winners: (Poland) Klemens Murańka (#1) / (Switzerland) Simon Ammann (#2)
  - Women's individual winner: (Japan) Sara Takanashi
- September 21 & 22, 2019: SJCC #8 in (Austria) Stams
  - Men's individual winner: (Japan) Taku Takeuchi (2 times)
  - Women's individual winners: (Austria) Eva Pinkelnig (#1) / (Slovenia) Ema Klinec (#2)
- September 28 & 29, 2019: SJCC #9 in (Germany) Klingenthal #1
  - Men's individual winner: (Slovenia) Domen Prevc (2 times)
- December 2019
- December 7 & 8, 2019: SJCC #10 in (Norway) Vikersund
  - Men's individual winners: (Japan) Taku Takeuchi (#1) / (Norway) Anders Håre (#2)
- December 13 & 14, 2019: SJCC #11 in (Norway) Notodden
  - Women's individual winners: (Italy) Jessica Malsiner (#1) / (Austria) Sophie Sorschag (#2)
- December 14 & 15, 2019: SJCC #12 in (Finland) Ruka
  - Men's individual winners: (Japan) Keiichi Sato (#1) / (Japan) Taku Takeuchi (#2)
- December 27 & 28, 2019: SJCC #13 in (Switzerland) Engelberg
- January 2020
- January 3 & 4: SJCC #14 in (Germany) Titisee-Neustadt
- January 11 & 12: SJCC #15 in (Austria) Bischofshofen
- January 18 & 19: SJCC #16 in (Germany) Klingenthal #2
- January 25 & 26: SJCC #17 in (Japan) Sapporo-Okurayama Ski Jump Stadium
- January 25 & 26: SJCC #18 in (Norway) Rena #1
- February 2020
- February 1 & 2: SJCC #19 in (Slovenia) Planica
- February 8 & 9: SJCC #20 in (Germany) Brotterode
- February 14 – 16: SJCC #21 in (United States) Iron Mountain
- February 22 & 23: SJCC #22 in (Italy) Fiemme Valley
- February 29 & March 1: SJCC #23 in (Norway) Rena #2
- March 2020
- March 7 & 8: SJCC #24 in (Finland) Lahti
- March 14 & 15: SJCC #25 in (Poland) Zakopane
- March 21 & 22: SJCC #26 (final) in (Russia) Chaykovsky

=== 2019–20 FIS Ski Jumping Alpen Cup ===
- Note: For the FIS page about these events, click here.
- August 4 & 5, 2019: SJAC #1 in (Germany) Klingenthal
  - Women's individual winners: (Slovenia) Nika Prevc (#1) / (Germany) Jenny Nowak (#2)
- August 7 & 8, 2019: SJAC #2 in (Germany) Pöhla
  - Women's individual winner: (Italy) Jessica Malsiner (2 times)
- August 9 & 10, 2019: SJAC #3 in (Germany) Bischofsgrün
  - Women's individual winners: (Austria) Vanessa Moharitsch (#1) / (Germany) Lia Boehme (#2)
- September 13 – 15, 2019: SJAC #4 in Velenje
  - Men's individual winner: (Austria) Marco Woergoetter (2 times)
  - Women's individual winner: (Slovenia) Jerica Jesenko (2 times)
  - Mixed Team winners: Slovenia (Lara Logar, Mark Hafnar, Pia Mazi, & Lovro Vodusek)
- September 20 – 22, 2019: SJAC #5 in (Italy) Predazzo-Fiemme Valley
  - Men's individual winner: (Austria) Marco Woergoetter (2 times)
  - Women's individual winners: (Austria) Lisa Hirner (#1) / (Italy) Jessica Malsiner (#2)
- December 20 – 22, 2019: SJAC #6 in (Austria) Seefeld in Tirol
  - Men's individual winners: (Slovenia) Žak Mogel (#1) / (Austria) Marco Wörgötter (#2)
  - Women's individual winner: (Austria) Lisa Eder (2 times)
- January 11 & 12: SJAC #7 in (Germany) Schonach im Schwarzwald
- February 7 & 8: SJAC #8 in (Slovenia) Kranj
- February 21 – 23: SJAC #9 (final) in (Austria) Villach

=== 2019–20 FIS Ski Jumping Cup ===
- Note: For the FIS page about these events, click here.
- July 6 & 7, 2019: SJC #1 in (Poland) Szczyrk
  - Men's individual winners: (Germany) Tim Fuchs (#1) / (Austria) Claudio Moerth (#2)
  - Women's individual winner: (Slovenia) Špela Rogelj (2 times)
- July 11 & 12, 2019: SJC #2 in (Kazakhstan) Shchuchinsk
  - Men's individual winner: (Austria) Maximilian Lienher (2 times)
  - Women's individual winners: (Kazakhstan) Valentina Sderzhikova (#1) / (Russia) Irma Machinya (#2)
- August 3 & 4, 2019: SJC #3 in (Slovenia) Ljubno ob Savinji
  - Men's individual winners: (Austria) Stefan Rainer (#1) / (Slovenia) Jernej Presecnik (#2)
  - Women's individual winners: (Slovenia) Urša Bogataj (#1) / (Slovenia) Nika Križnar (#2)
- August 17 & 18, 2019: SJC #4 in (South Korea) PyeongChang
  - Men's individual winners: (Germany) Tim Fuchs (#1) / (Japan) Ren Nikaido (#2)
- August 24 & 25, 2019: SJC #5 in (Romania) Râșnov
  - Men's individual winner: (Austria) Markus Rupitsch (2 times)
  - Women's individual winner: (Romania) Daniela Haralambie (2 times)
- October 5 & 6, 2019: SJC #6 in (Austria) Villach #1
  - Men's individual winners: (Norway) Christian Ingebrigtsen (#1) / (Norway) Matias Braathen (#2)
  - Women's individual winner: (Germany) Agnes Reisch (2 times)
- December 13 & 14, 2019: SJC #7 in (Norway) Notodden
  - Men's individual winners: (Austria) Stefan Rainer (#1) / (Germany) Fabian Seidl (#2)
- December 21 & 22, 2019: SJC #8 in (Germany) Oberwiesenthal
  - Men's individual winners: (Russia) Danil Sadreev (#1) / (Germany) Tim Fuchs (#2)
  - Women's individual winners: (Germany) Selina Freitag (#1) / (Poland) Kinga Rajda (#2)
- January 18 & 19: SJC #9 in (Poland) Zakopane
- January 25 & 26: SJC #10 in (Germany) Rastbüchl
- February 1 & 2: SJC #11 in (Czech Republic) Liberec
- February 15 & 16: SJC #12 (final) in (Austria) Villach #2

=== 2019 FIS Ski Jumping Grand Prix ===
- Note: For the FIS page about these events, click here.
- July 19 – 21: SJGP #1 in Wisła
  - Men's individual winner: (Slovenia) Timi Zajc
  - Men's team winners: Poland (Piotr Żyła, Aleksander Zniszczoł, Kamil Stoch, & Dawid Kubacki)
- July 26 & 27: SJGP #2 in Hinterzarten
  - individual winners: (Germany) Karl Geiger (m) / (Japan) Sara Takanashi (f)
  - Mixed Team winners: Germany (Juliane Seyfarth, Karl Geiger, Agnes Reisch, & Richard Freitag)
- August 8 – 10: SJGP #3 in (France) Courchevel
  - individual winners: (Slovenia) Timi Zajc (m) / (Japan) Sara Takanashi (f)
- August 16 – 18: SJGP #4 in (Poland) Zakopane
  - Men's individual winner: (Poland) Kamil Stoch
  - Men's team winners: Japan (Naoki Nakamura, Keiichi Sato, Yukiya Satō, & Junshirō Kobayashi)
- August 17 & 18: SJGP #5 in (Czech Republic) Frenštát pod Radhoštěm
  - Women's individual winner: (Slovenia) Nika Križnar
- August 22 – 24: SJGP #6 in (Japan) Hakuba
  - Men's individual winner: (Japan) Ryoyu Kobayashi (2 times)
- September 28 & 29: SJGP #7 in (Austria) Hinzenbach
  - Men's individual winner: (Poland) Dawid Kubacki
- October 4 & 5: SJGP #8 (final) in (Germany) Klingenthal
  - Men's individual winner: (Slovenia) Anže Lanišek

== Ski mountaineering ==
=== 2020 Winter Youth Olympics (Ski mountaineering) ===
- January 10 – 14: Ski mountaineering at the 2020 Winter Youth Olympics in (Switzerland) Villars-sur-Ollon

=== 2019–20 ISMF World Cup ===
- December 20 & 21, 2019: ISMF #1 in (France) Aussois
  - individual Race Medium winner: (France) Axelle Mollaret
  - individual Race winner: (Italy) Robert Antonioli
  - sprint Race winners: (Switzerland) Iwan Arnold (m) / (Switzerland) Marianne Fatton (f)
- January 25 & 26: ISMF #2 in (Andorra) La Massana
- February 8 & 9: ISMF #3 in (Germany) Berchtesgaden
- February 19 & 20: ISMF #4 in (China) Wanlong Resort (Zhangjiakou)
- April 2 – 5: ISMF #5 (final) in (Italy) Madonna di Campiglio

=== 2020 ISMF Continental championships ===
- April 2 – 5: 2020 ISMF European Championships in (Italy) Madonna di Campiglio
- TBA: 2020 ISMF Asian-Pacific Championship (location TBA)
- TBA: 2020 ISMF North-American Championship (location TBA)

== Snowboarding ==
=== 2020 Winter Youth Olympics (Snowboarding) ===
- January 18 – 21: Snowboarding at the 2020 Winter Youth Olympics (halfpipe & slopestyle) in (Switzerland) Leysin
- January 20 & 21: Snowboarding at the 2020 Winter Youth Olympics (Snowboard Cross) in (Switzerland) Villars-sur-Ollon

=== 2019–20 Alpine Snowboarding World Cup ===
- Note: For the FIS page about these events, click here.
- December 7 & 8, 2019: ASWC #1 in (Russia) Bannoye
  - Parallel slalom winners: (Austria) Andreas Prommegger (m) / (Switzerland) Julie Zogg (f)
  - Parallel giant slalom winners: (Italy) Roland Fischnaller (m) / (Germany) Ramona Theresia Hofmeister (f)
- December 14, 2019: ASWC #2 in (Italy) Cortina d'Ampezzo
  - Parallel giant slalom winners: (Italy) Roland Fischnaller (m) / (Germany) Ramona Theresia Hofmeister (f)
- December 19, 2019: ASWC #3 in (Italy) Carezza
  - Event cancelled.
- January 4 & 5: ASWC #4 in (Austria) Lackenhof
- January 11: ASWC #5 in (Switzerland) Scuol
- January 14 & 15: ASWC #6 in (Austria) Bad Gastein
- January 18: ASWC #7 in (Slovenia) Rogla Ski Resort
- January 25 & 26: ASWC #8 in (Italy) Piancavallo
- February 22 & 23: ASWC #9 in (South Korea) PyeongChang
- February 29 & March 1: ASWC #10 in (Canada) Blue Mountain
- March 14 & 15: ASWC #11 in (Germany) Winterberg

=== 2019–20 Snowboard Cross World Cup ===
- Note: For the FIS page about these events, click here.
- December 12 – 14, 2019: SBXWC #1 in (Austria) Montafon
  - Snowboard Cross winners: (Austria) Alessandro Hämmerle (m) / (Czech Republic) Eva Samková (f)
- December 20 & 21, 2019: SBXWC #2 in (Italy) Breuil-Cervinia
  - Snowboard Cross winners: (Italy) Lorenzo Sommariva (m) / (Italy) Michela Moioli (f)
- January 9 – 11: SBXWC #3 in (Austria) Bad Gastein
- January 24 – 26: SBXWC #4 in (Canada) Big White Ski Resort
- January 31 – February 2: SBXWC #5 in (Germany) Feldberg
- February 28 & 29: SBXWC #6 in (China) Genting Resort Secret Garden
- March 6 & 7: SBXWC #7 in (Spain) Sierra Nevada
- March 13 – 15: SBXWC #8 in (Switzerland) Veysonnaz

=== 2019–20 Freestyle Snowboarding World Cup ===
- Note: For the FIS page about these events, click here.
- August 24 & 25, 2019: FSWC #1 in (New Zealand) Cardrona Alpine Resort
  - Big Air winners: (United States) Chris Corning (m) / (Finland) Enni Rukajärvi (f)
- November 2, 2019: FSWC #2 in (Italy) Modena Skipass
  - Big Air winners: (Canada) Nicolas Laframboise (m) / (Japan) Reira Iwabuchi (f)
- December 12 – 14, 2019: FSWC #3 in (United States) Copper Mountain
  - Halfpipe winners: (Australia) Scotty James (f) / (Spain) Queralt Castellet (f)
- December 13 & 14, 2019: FSWC #4 in (China) Beijing
  - Big Air winners: (Canada) Maxence Parrot (m) / (Japan) Miyabi Onitsuka (f)
- December 20 & 21, 2019: FSWC #5 in (United States) Atlanta
  - Big Air winners: (United States) Chris Corning (m) / (Japan) Reira Iwabuchi (f)
- December 20 – 22, 2019: FSWC #6 in (China) Genting Resort Secret Garden
  - Halfpipe winners: (Australia) Scotty James (f) / (China) Liu Jiayu (f)
- January 4: FSWC #7 in (Germany) Düsseldorf
  - Event cancelled.
- January 13 – 18: FSWC #8 in (Switzerland) Laax
- January 22 & 23: FSWC #9 in (Italy) Seiser Alm
- January 29 – February 1: FSWC #10 in (United States) Mammoth Mountain
- February 13 – 16: FSWC #11 in (Canada) Calgary
- March 20 & 21: FSWC #12 in (Czech Republic) Špindlerův Mlýn

=== 2019–20 FIS Snowboard European Cup ===
- Note: For the FIS page about these events, click here.
- November 2019
- November 28, 2019: SBEC #1 in (Austria) Pitztal
  - Cancelled
- January 2020
- January 11 & 12: SBEC #3 (location TBA)
- January 14 & 15: SBEC #4 in (Germany) Grasgehren
  - Men's Snowboard Cross winners: (#1) / (#2)
  - Women's Snowboard Cross winners: (#1) / (#2)
- February 2020
- February 1 & 2: SBEC #5 (location TBA)
- February 8 & 9: SBEC #6 in (Switzerland) Lenzerheide
  - Men's parallel slalom winners: (#1) / (#2)
  - Women's parallel slalom winners: (#1) / (#2)
- February 12 & 13: SBEC #7 (location TBA)
- February 15 & 16: SBEC #8 in (Austria) Simonhöhe
  - Men's parallel giant slalom winners: (#1) / (#2)
  - Women's parallel giant slalom winners: (#1) / (#2)
- March 2020
- March 7 & 8: SBEC #9 in (Austria) Tauplitz
  - Men's parallel slalom winners: (#1) / (#2)
  - Women's parallel slalom winners: (#1) / (#2)
- March 14 & 15: SBEC #10 in (Austria) Reiteralm
  - Men's Snowboard Cross winners: (#1) / (#2)
  - Women's Snowboard Cross winners: (#1) / (#2)
- March 20 & 21: SBEC #11 in (Switzerland) Lenk
  - Men's Snowboard Cross winners: (#1) / (#2)
  - Women's Snowboard Cross winners: (#1) / (#2)
- March 21 & 22: SBEC #12 in (Switzerland) Davos
  - Parallel slalom winners: (m) / (f)
  - Parallel giant slalom winners: (m) / (f)

=== 2019–20 FIS Snowboard Nor-Am Cup ===
- Note: For the FIS page about these events, click here.
- December 17 & 18, 2019: SNAC #1 in (Colorado) Copper Mountain
  - Halfpipe #1 winners: (Japan) Shuichiro Shigeno (m) / (Canada) Brooke D'Hondt (f)
  - Halfpipe #2 winners: (Japan) Kaishu Hirano (m) / (Japan) Manon Kaji (f)
- January 14 – 16: SNAC #2 in (British Columbia) Sun Peaks Resort
- January 29 – 31: SNAC #3 in (British Columbia) Big White Ski Resort
- February 7 – 9: SNAC #4 in (California) Mammoth Mountain Ski Area
- February 18 – 20: SNAC #5 in (Quebec) Maximise
- March 2 – 5: SNAC #6 in (Utah) Woodward – Park City
- March 11 – 13: SNAC #7 (final) in (Quebec) Mont Orignal

=== 2019 FIS Snowboard South American Cup ===
- Note: For the FIS page about these events, click here.
- August 2 – 4: SACSB #1 in (Chile) La Parva #1
  - Men's slopestyle winner: (Chile) Inaqui Irarrazaval (2 times)
  - Women's slopestyle winner: (Chile) Antonia Yanez (2 times)
- August 30 – September 1: SACSB #2 in (Chile) La Parva #2
  - Event cancelled.
- September 3 – 5: SACSB #3 in (Chile) Pucón #1
  - Snowboard Cross winners: (Argentina) Steven Williams (m) / (United Kingdom) Charlotte Bankes (f)
  - Giant slalom winners: (China) SHAO Yunyang (m) / (China) CUI Ming (f)
- September 7 & 8: SACSB #4 in (Argentina) Cerro Catedral
  - Men's Big Air winners: (Argentina) Pedro Bidegain (#1) / (Argentina) Matías Schmitt (#2)
  - Women's Big Air winner: (Chile) Antonia Yanez (2 times)
- September 8 – 11: SACSB #5 in (Chile) Corralco Ski Resort
  - Men's Snowboard Cross winner: (Argentina) Steven Williams (2 times)
  - Women's Snowboard Cross winner: (Japan) Karen Fujita (2 times)
- September 14 & 15: SACSB #6 in (Chile) Pucón #2
  - Event cancelled.
- September 16 & 17: SACSB #7 in (Chile) Pucón #3
  - Men's Snowboard Cross winner: (Chile) Diego Cerón (2 times)
  - Women's Snowboard Cross winner: (Brazil) Isabel Clark Ribeiro (2 times)
- September 23 & 24: SACSB #8 in (Argentina) Chapelco
  - Slopestyle winners: (Chile) Álvaro Yáñez (m) / (United States) Terra Traub (f)
- September 28 & 29: SACSB #9 (final) in (Argentina) Cerro Castor
  - Men's Snowboard Cross winner: (Argentina) Steven Williams (2 times)
  - Women's Snowboard Cross winners: (China) FENG He (#1) / (Argentina) Maria Augustina Pardo (#2)

=== 2019 FIS Snowboard Australia & New Zealand Cup ===
- Note: For the FIS page about these events, click here.
- August 5 – 8: SBANC #1 in (Australia) Mount Hotham #1'
  - Note: The second set of snowboard cross events for men & women were cancelled.
  - Snowboard Cross winners: (Australia) Cameron Bolton (m) / (Australia) Christina Taylor (f)
- August 6 – 9: SBANC #2 in (Australia) Perisher
  - Note: The slopestyle events were cancelled.
  - Men's Big Air winners: (Australia) Valentino Guseli (#1) / (Sweden) Daniel Alkefjaerd (#2)
  - Women's Big Air winners: (United Kingdom) Katie Ormerod (#1) / (Australia) Alexandra Chen (#2)
- August 14 – 17: SBANC #3 in (New Zealand) Cardrona #1
  - Slopestyle winners: (China) SU Yiming (m) / (Japan) Rina Yoshika (f)
- August 25 – September 2: SBANC #4 in (New Zealand) Cardrona #2
  - Halfpipe winners: (China) Zhang Yiwei (m) / (China) Cai Xuetong (f)
  - Slopestyle winners: (Japan) Ryoma Kimata (m) / (Norway) Silje Norendal (f)
- September 2 – 4: SBANC #5 in (Australia) Mount Hotham #2
  - Men's Snowboard Cross winner: (Japan) Yoshiki Takahara (2 times)
  - Women's Snowboard Cross winners: (Australia) Belle Brockhoff (#1) / (Germany) Jana Fischer (#2)
- October 2: SBANC #6 (final) in (New Zealand) Cardrona #3
  - Halfpipe winners: (China) WANG Ziyang (m) / (China) WU Shaotong (f)

== Telemark skiing ==
=== Telemark Skiing World Junior Championships ===
- March 2 – 5: 2020 FIS Junior World Telemark Skiing Championships in (France) Gérardmer (Vosges)

=== 2020 Telemark Skiing World Cup ===
- Note: For the FIS page about these events, click here.
- January 24 & 25: TSWC #1 in (France) Pralognan-la-Vanoise
- January 29 – February 1: TSWC #2 in (France) Samoëns
- February 8 & 9: TSWC #3 in (Slovenia) Krvavec Ski Resort
- February 15 & 16: TSWC #4 in (Germany) Bad Hindelang-Oberjoch
- March 15 & 16: TSWC #5 in (Switzerland) Mürren-Schilthorn
- March 19 – 21: TSWC #6 (final) in (Switzerland) Thyon 4 Valleys
