= Storm Klomhaus =

American alpine skier (born 1998)

Personal information
- Nationality: American
- Born: October 17, 1998 (age 26); Boulder, Colorado, United States

Sport
- Sport: Alpine skiing

Storm Klomhaus (born October 17, 1998) is an American World Cup alpine ski racer on the US Ski Team. She is on Team USA with the U.S. Olympic & Paralympic Committee(USOPC). Klomhaus is the 2020 NCAA Champion and podiumed 3x times at US Nationals in 2021. She dates Olympic ski racer River Radamus. Klomhaus was awarded Skier of the Year in 2020 and inducted into the Snow Sports Hall of Fame. She tore her anterior cruciate ligament for the 3rd time prior to the 2021/2022 World Cup season.
