= Krvavec Ski Resort =

Ski resort in Slovenia

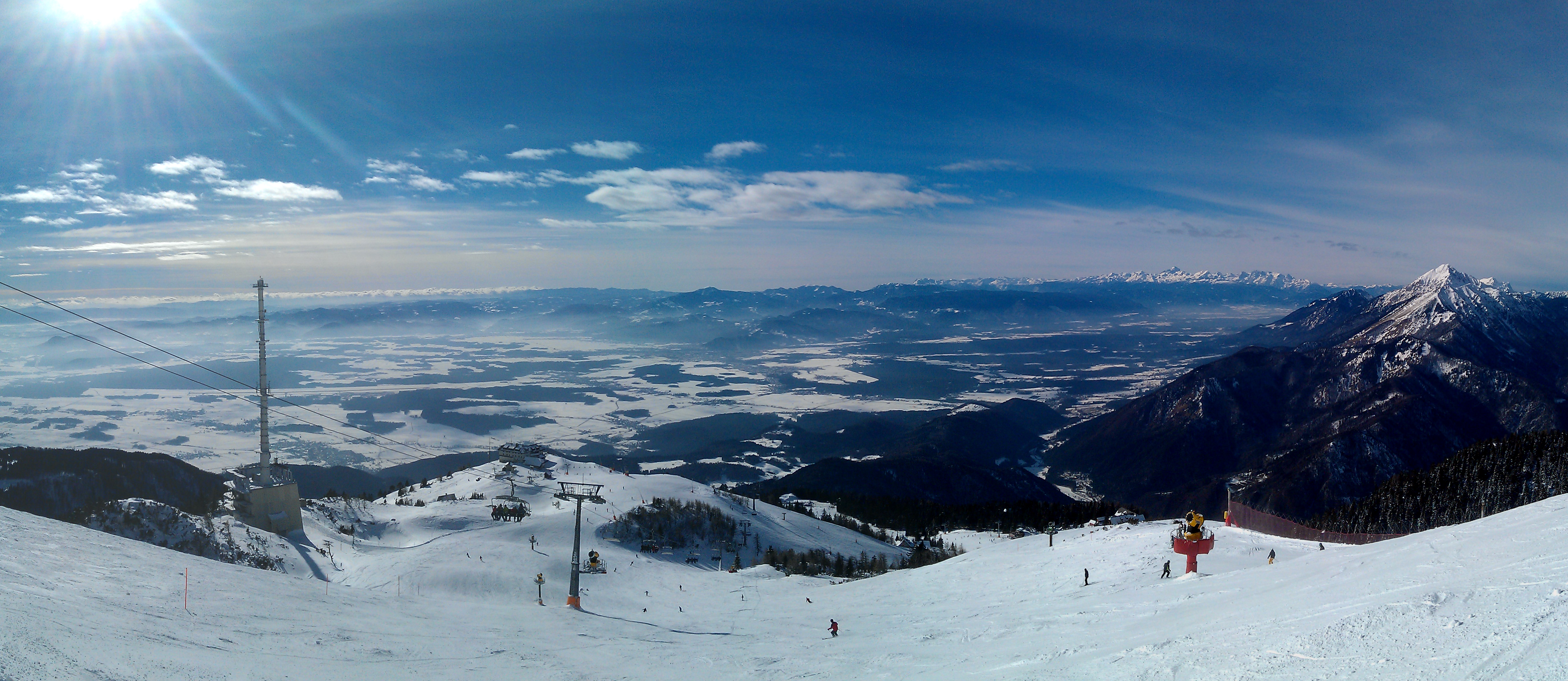
- Panorama of Krvavec Ski Resort
- Interactive map of Krvavec Ski Resort
- Location: Cerklje na Gorenjskem; Kamnik–Savinja Alps; Slovenia
- Nearest city: Kranj
- Coordinates: 46°18′02″N 14°32′06″E
- Vertical: 520 m (1,710 ft)
- Top elevation: 1,971 m (6,467 ft)
- Base elevation: 1,450 m (4,760 ft)
- Skiable area: 1.06 square kilometres (261.9 acres)
- Trails: Total 30 km 7 km 15 km 8 km
- Longest run: 11 km (6.8 mi)
- Lift system: 11 total 1 gondola 3 surface 1 singlechair 3 doublechair 1 fourchair 2 sixchair
- Lift capacity: 15.325 / hr
- Terrain parks: 1
- Snowfall: 600 cm (240 in)
- Snowmaking: 95% of area
- Night skiing: none
- Website: rtc-krvavec.si

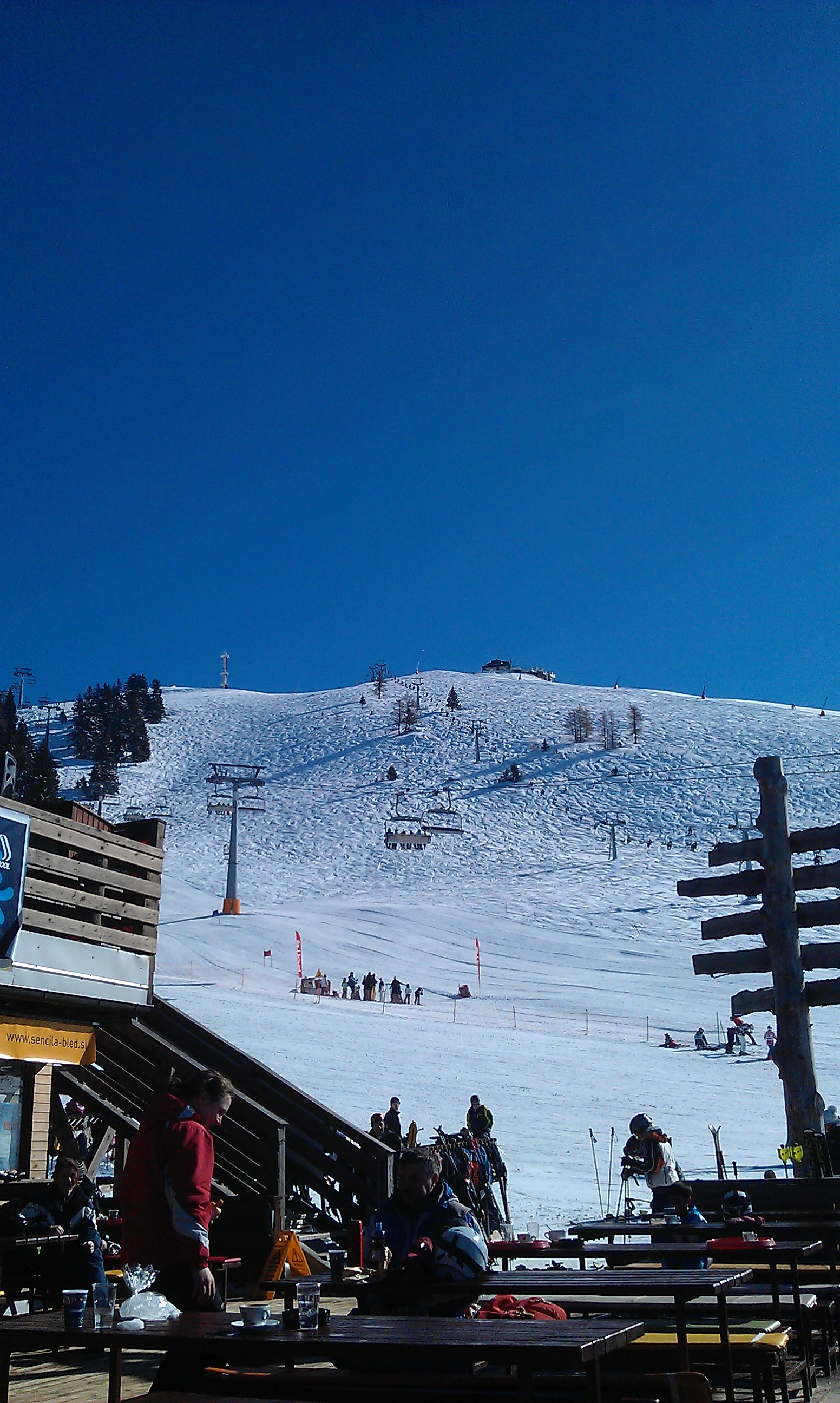
View from Brunarica Sonček

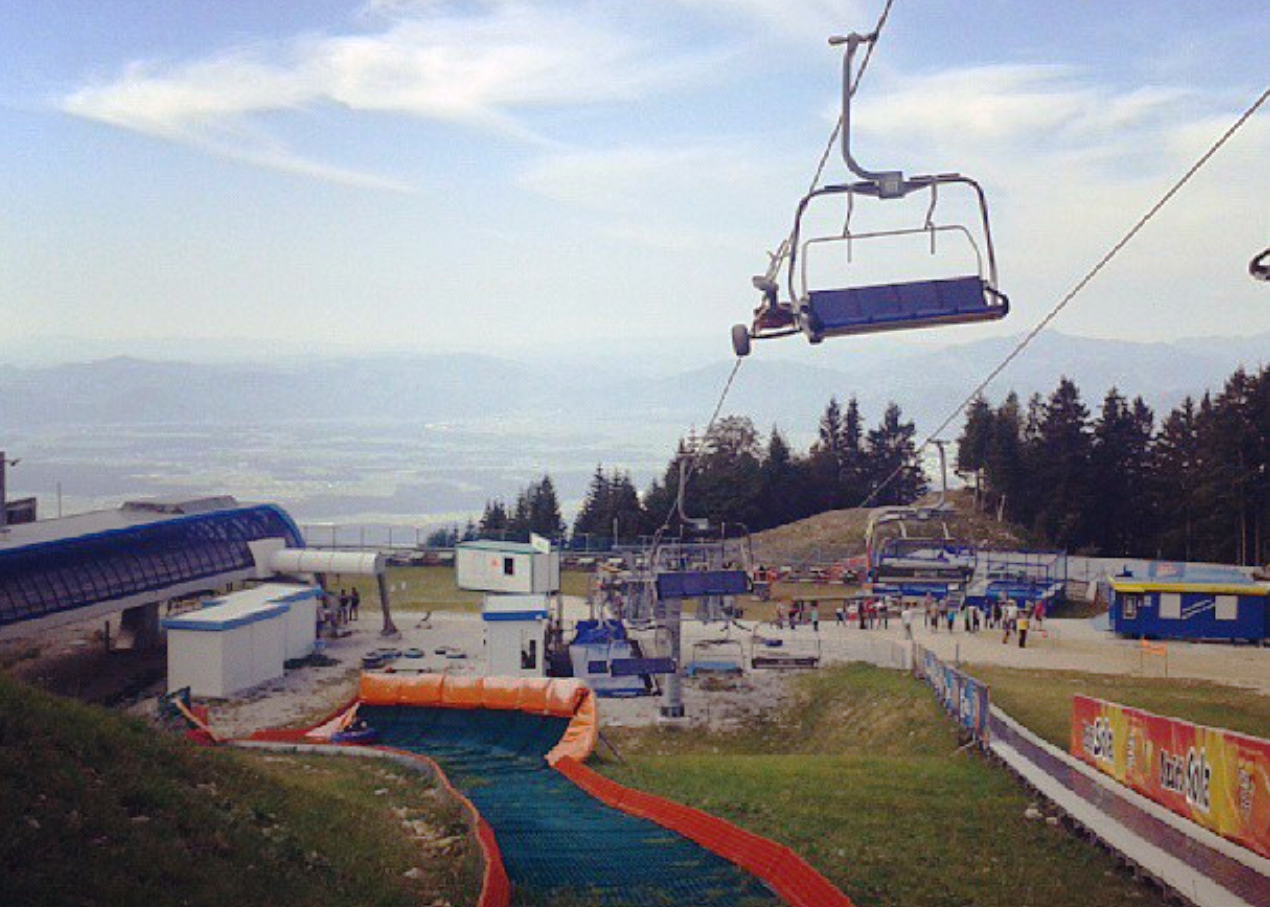
Summer Park Krvavec

The Krvavec Ski Resort is the second-largest Slovenian ski resort, located in the Municipality of Cerklje na Gorenjskem in the Kamnik–Savinja Alps. The nearest city is Kranj and it is 25 km from Ljubljana. The resort is located 10 km from Ljubljana Jože Pučnik Airport and it is the nearest ski resort to an international airport in Europe. It has a total 30 km of ski slopes.

== History ==
The first lift was opened on August 2, 1958. The lift was made in the factory Žičnica Ljubljana and it was in service for 15 years. In 1966 they built two new lifts, singlechair Gospinica and doublechair which connected Tiha dolina and Njivice. In 1968 they got the first Snow groomer, which increased the quality of ski slopes. In 1973 a consortium was established for Krvavec's development. The result was the new Poma gondola known as eggs. In 1973 they also built two new doublechairs Vrh Krvavca and Njivice and two surface lifts Podradišče and Luža. In 1978 the ski resort was expanded to the Križ Pasture (Slovene: Kriška planina). They built a surface lift system Križišče and a new doublechair Kriška planina. Today's ski resort's top elevation (1971 m) was reached in 1983 when the new doublechair Zvoh was built. In 1989 the Njivice doublechair was replaced with two doublechair lifts Njivice I and Njivice II. In 1999 a new gondola lift (Garaventa) replaced the old one and it provided a better connection between the mountain and the valley. In 2006 a new Doppelmayr sixchair replaced an old doublechair Vrh Krvavca and in 2008 a new Doppelmayr's fourchair replaced an old doublechair Tiha Dolina.In 2010 Zvoh doublechair got new Doppelmayr's seats. In 2012 summer season they opened Summer Park Krvavec and in 2013 they opened a new Doppelmayr surface lift Luža with a double capacity as the 40 years old forerunner.

== Climate ==
Krvavec has a subarctic climate (Köppen Dfc).

Climate data for Krvavec, 1991–2020 normals, extremes 1951–2020
Month	Jan	Feb	Mar	Apr	May	Jun	Jul	Aug	Sep	Oct	Nov	Dec	Year
Record high °C (°F)	14.9 (58.8)	14.3 (57.7)	16.8 (62.2)	19.3 (66.7)	23.7 (74.7)	25.5 (77.9)	28.5 (83.3)	29.1 (84.4)	25.4 (77.7)	24 (75)	20.1 (68.2)	17.7 (63.9)	29.1 (84.4)
Mean daily maximum °C (°F)	−0.6 (30.9)	−0.9 (30.4)	1.6 (34.9)	5.2 (41.4)	10.1 (50.2)	13.8 (56.8)	16.1 (61.0)	16.6 (61.9)	11.6 (52.9)	8.1 (46.6)	3.5 (38.3)	0.5 (32.9)	7.1 (44.9)
Daily mean °C (°F)	−3.6 (25.5)	−4 (25)	−1.7 (28.9)	1.9 (35.4)	6.4 (43.5)	10.2 (50.4)	12.3 (54.1)	12.5 (54.5)	8.1 (46.6)	4.7 (40.5)	0.7 (33.3)	−2.5 (27.5)	3.8 (38.8)
Mean daily minimum °C (°F)	−6.2 (20.8)	−6.6 (20.1)	−4.2 (24.4)	−0.5 (31.1)	3.8 (38.8)	7.6 (45.7)	9.8 (49.6)	10.0 (50.0)	5.9 (42.6)	2.4 (36.3)	−1.5 (29.3)	−5 (23)	1.3 (34.3)
Record low °C (°F)	−21.7 (−7.1)	−26.7 (−16.1)	−23.5 (−10.3)	−14.2 (6.4)	−9.6 (14.7)	−3.5 (25.7)	−1.2 (29.8)	−0.3 (31.5)	−3.3 (26.1)	−12.1 (10.2)	−14.9 (5.2)	−20.8 (−5.4)	−26.7 (−16.1)
Average precipitation mm (inches)	82 (3.2)	101 (4.0)	119 (4.7)	112 (4.4)	144 (5.7)	175 (6.9)	173 (6.8)	163 (6.4)	174 (6.9)	147 (5.8)	159 (6.3)	139 (5.5)	1,688 (66.6)
Average precipitation days (≥ 0.1 mm)	10	10	11	13	15	15	14	13	12	13	14	12	152
Source: Slovenian Environment Agency (ARSO)

== Accommodation ==
Because of the great Krvavec's location, many people are accommodated in bigger towns. There is a ski bus from Ljubljana (through Domžale) to Krvavec during the ski season, which operates during the weekends.

Accommodation capabilities on the mountain are:

- Hotel Krvavec & Plaža Krvavec*

== Snow Park ==
Krvavec Snow Park is located at the lower part of the Slope 15. Its vertical is 140 m and length is 800 m. It has 6 jumps and 8 different objects (straight box 6m, kink box 6m, straight/down rails 6m: single, double, triple barrel, T rail, barrel).

== Ski lifts ==
Lift name	Type of the lift	Manufacturer	Year of construction
Krožno kabinska žičnica	Gondola	Garaventa	1999
Gospinca	Singlechair	Girak	1966
Tiha dolina	Fourchair	Doppelmayr	2008
Kriška planina	Doublechair	Poma	1978
Vrh Krvavca	Sixchair	Doppelmayr	2006
Njivice I	Doublechair	Girak	1989
Njivice II	Doublechair	Girak	1990
Zvoh	Sixchair	Leitner	2023
Luža	Surface lift	Doppelmayr	2013
Kržišče A	Surface lift	Poma	1978
Kržišče B	Surface lift	Poma	1978

== Summer activities ==
- Hiking
- Mountain biking
- Climbing adventure park
- Climbing wall
- Mountain scooters
- Mountain go-carts
- Archery range
- Slack line range
- Trampolines
- Frisbee golf
- Tube sliding

== Further plans ==
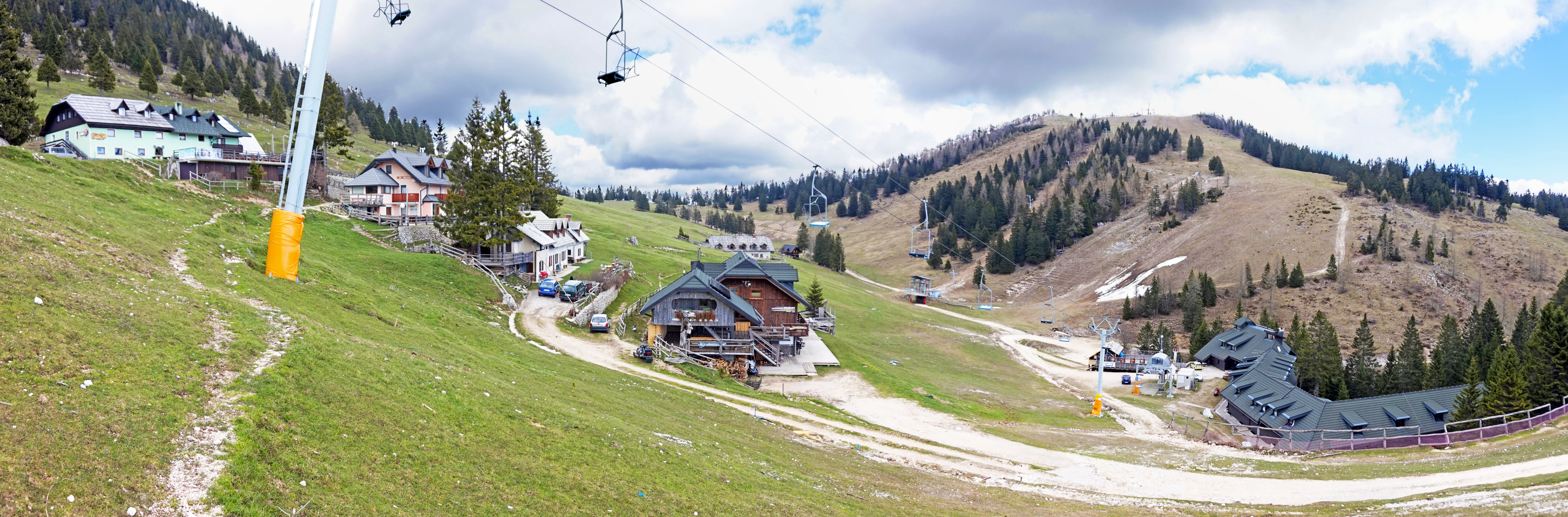
Križ Pasture

In the early 1990s, plans for Krvavec Ski Resort were extensive, such as expanding the resort to Korenski Vrh and even to the Kalški greben peak, which is over 2000 meters high. These plans covered even the expansion to the eastern side of the Križ Pasture (Slovene: Kriška Planina) with the new connection with the lift Jezerca. The construction of the new detachable fourchair Jezerca has been proposed since the 1990s, but it hasn't been realized until now, nevertheless it is expected that its construction will be begin in the next years. The Slovenian Government has already issued the concession for the construction and the project is now at the stage of getting the constructional permission.

== Gallery ==
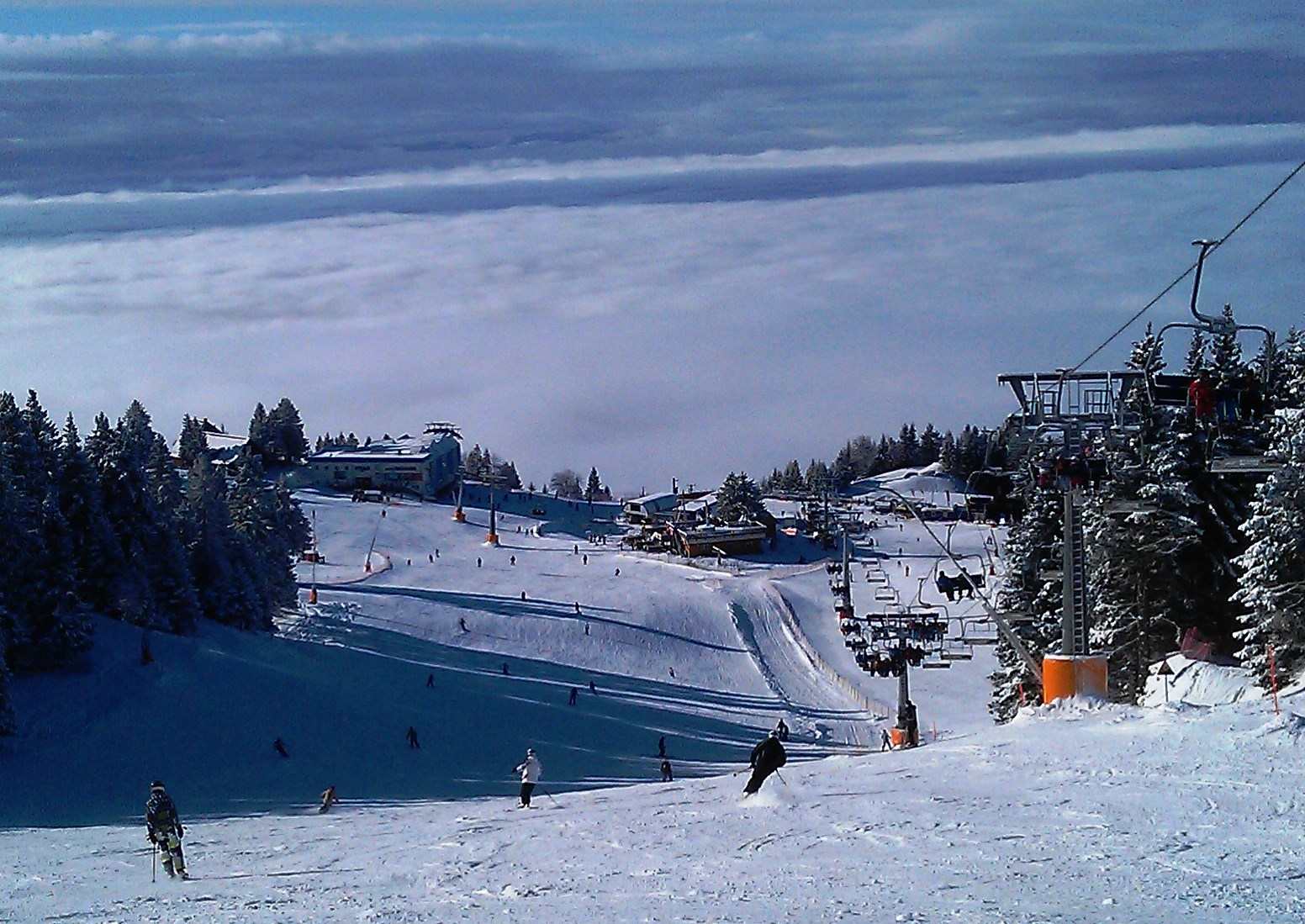
View from the Tiha dolina.

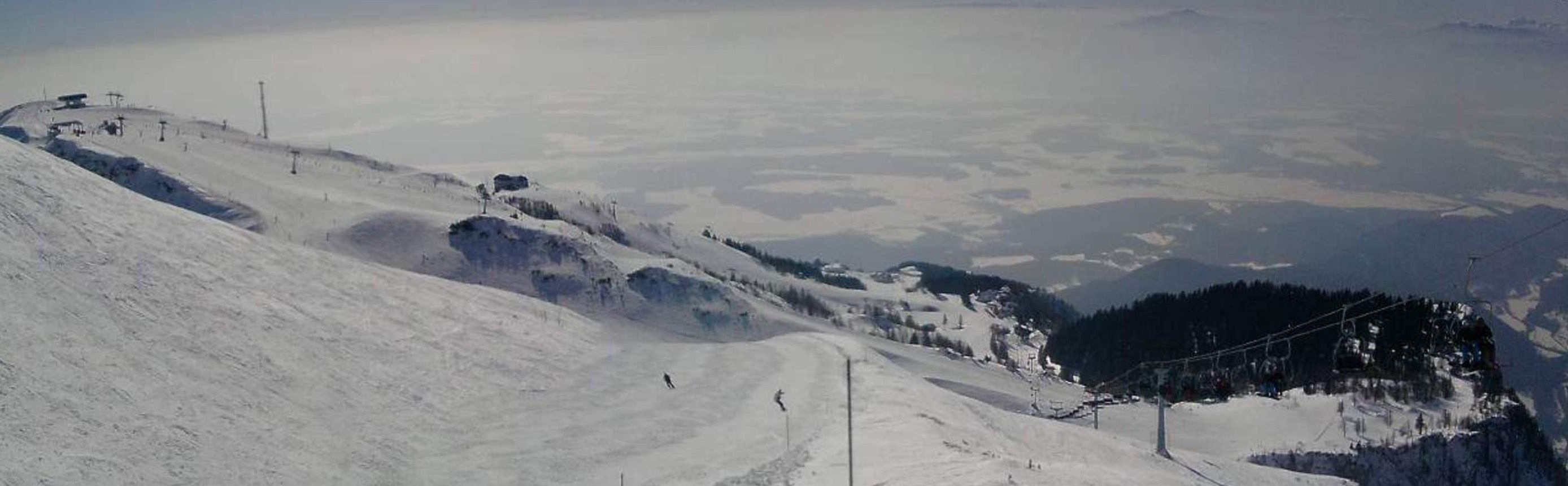
View of the main ski lifts from the top of the resort.

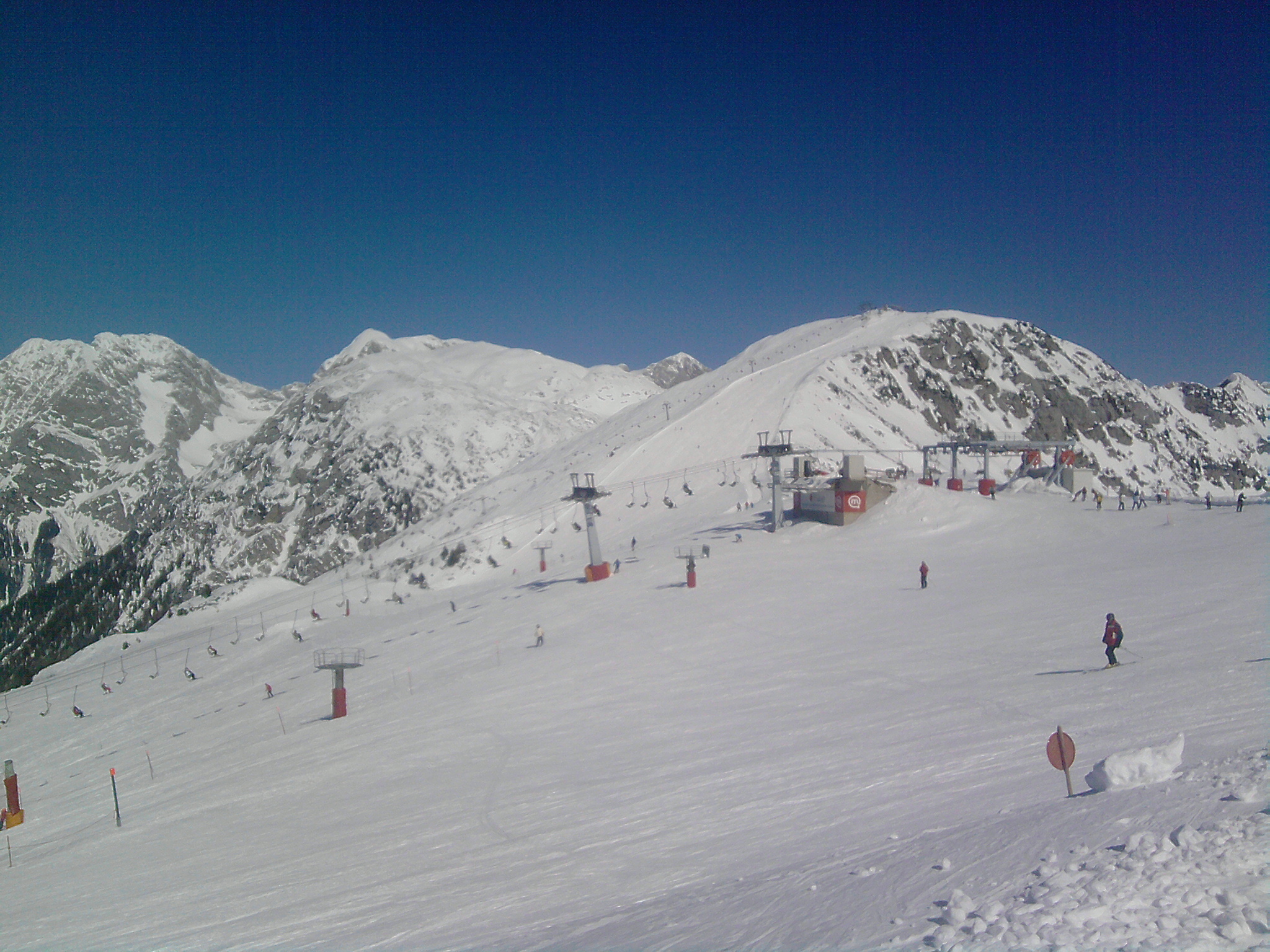
View of the top of the resortfrom the south.

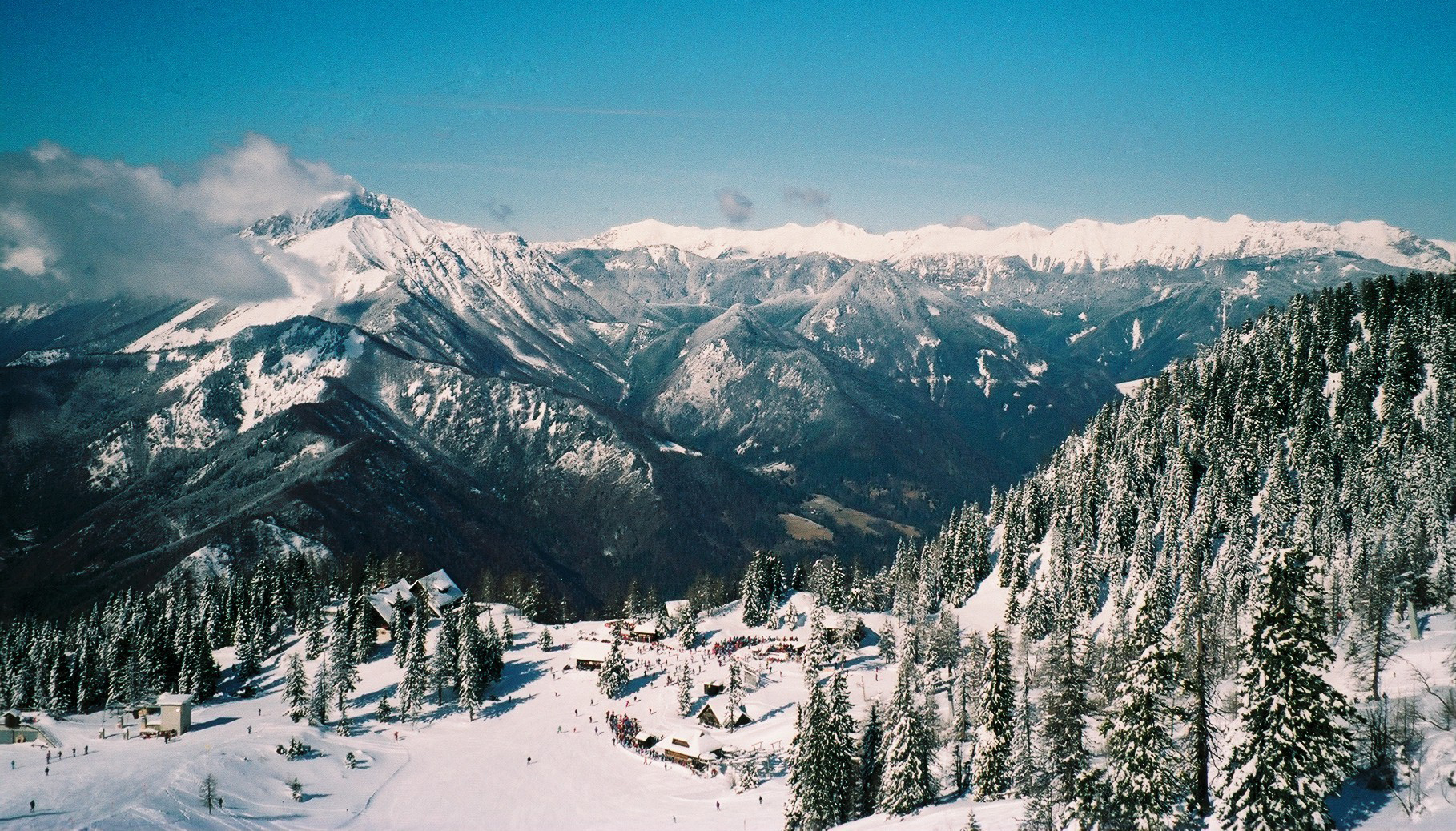
Tiha dolina with refreshment and accommodation buildings.

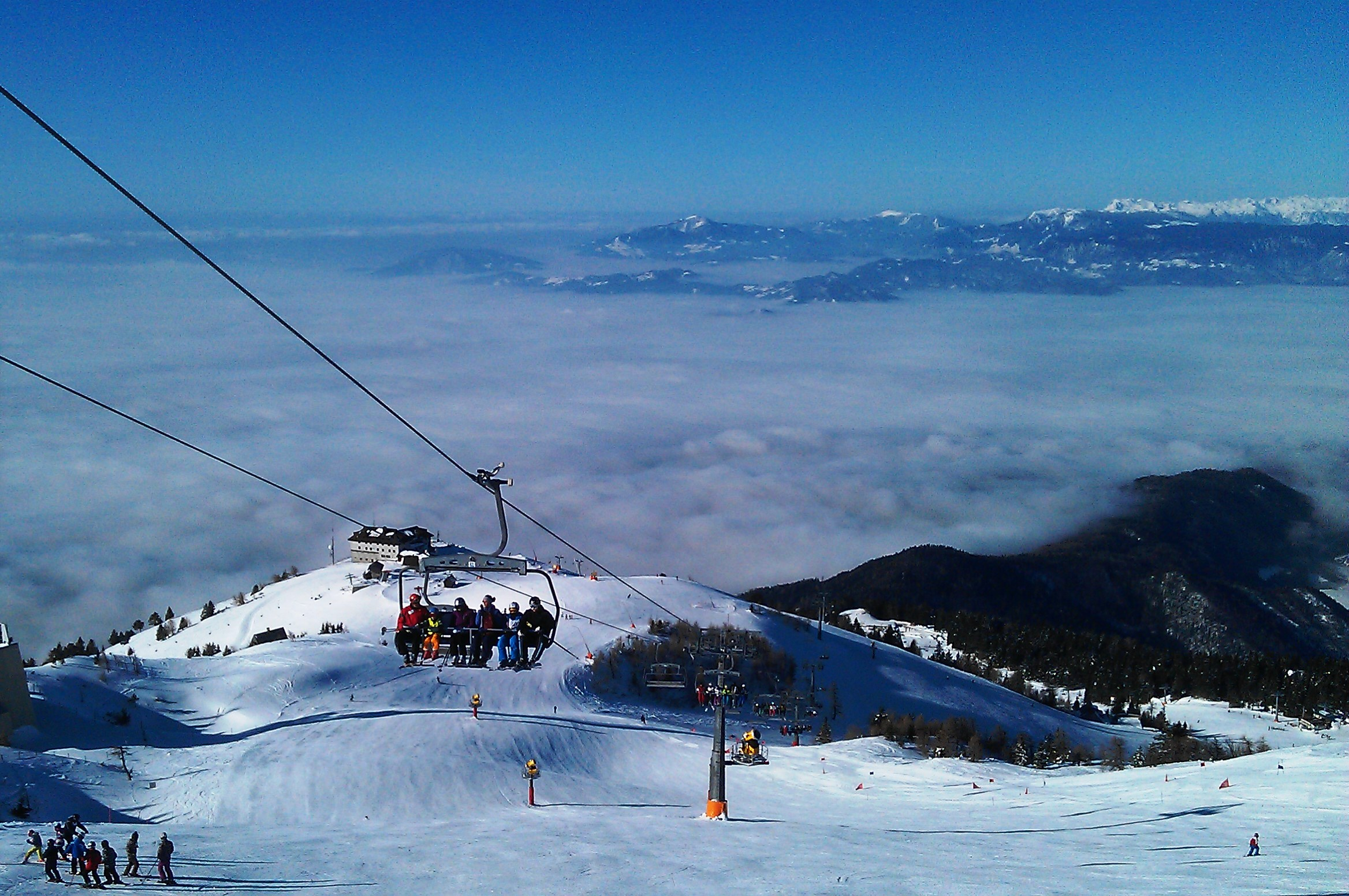
The view from the Vrh Krvavca

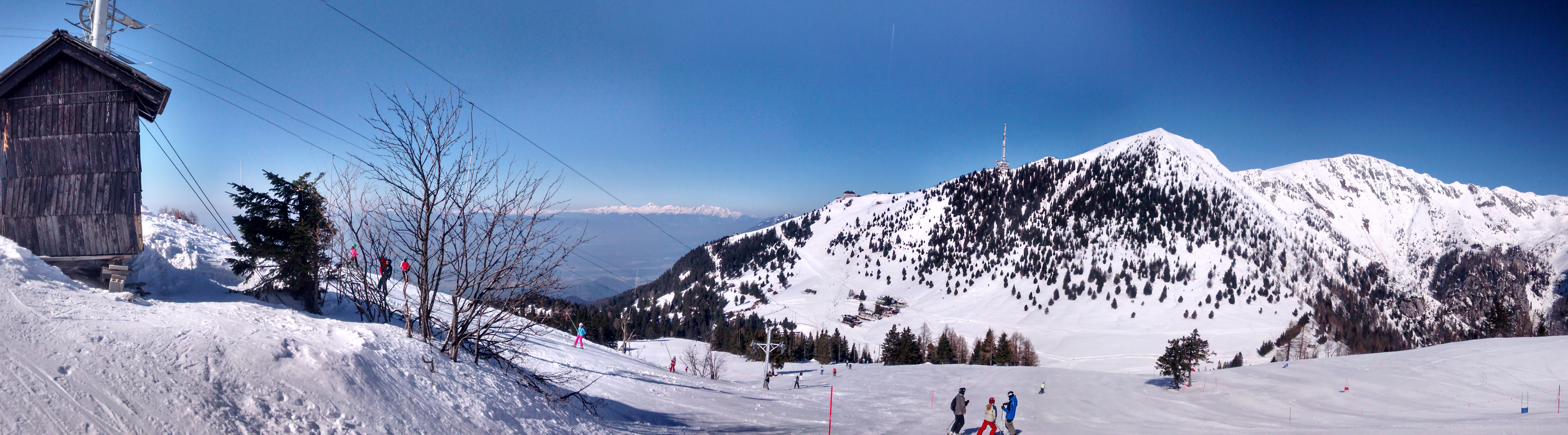
Panorama from the Križišče Peak

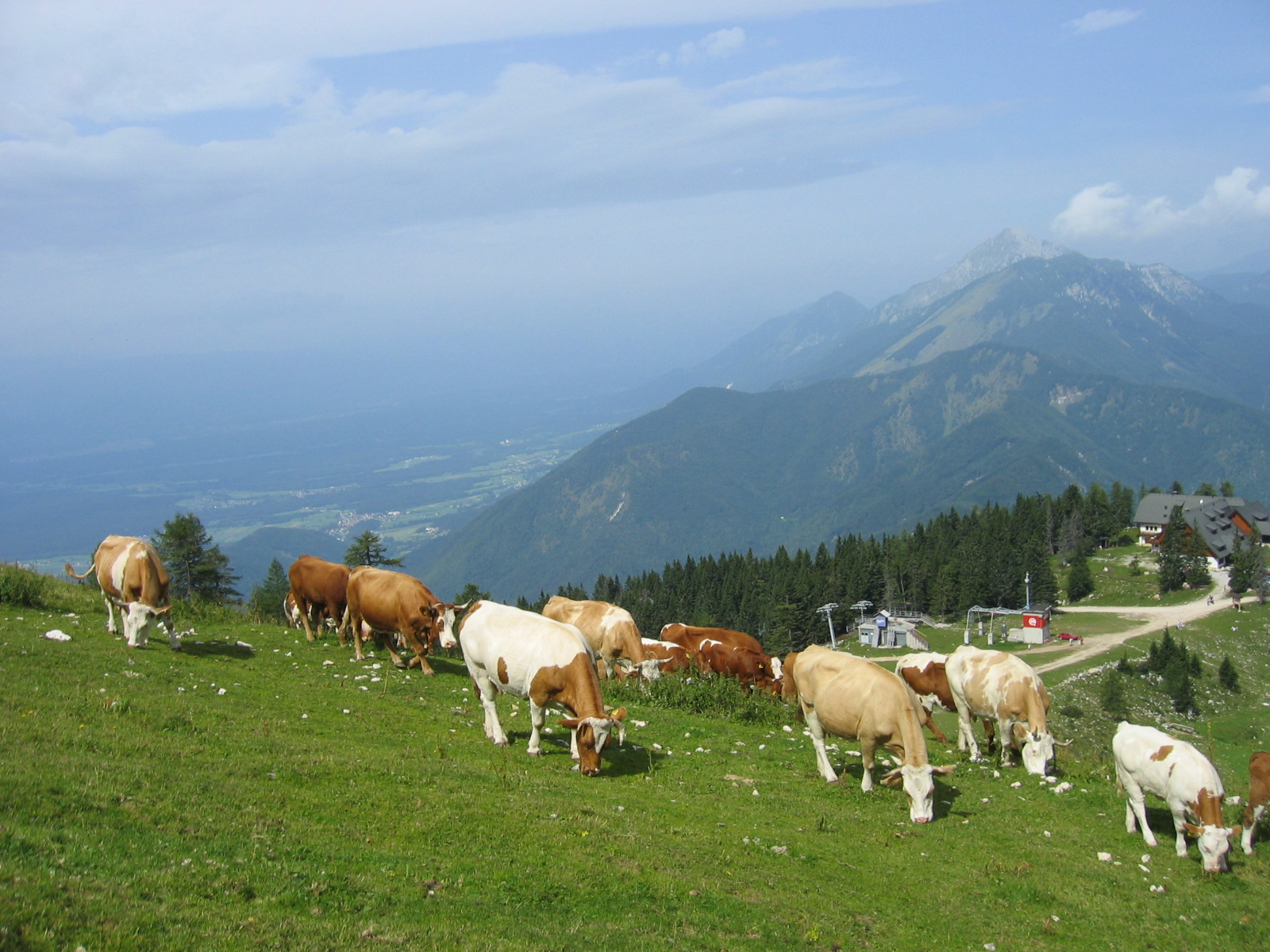
Krvavec in summer.

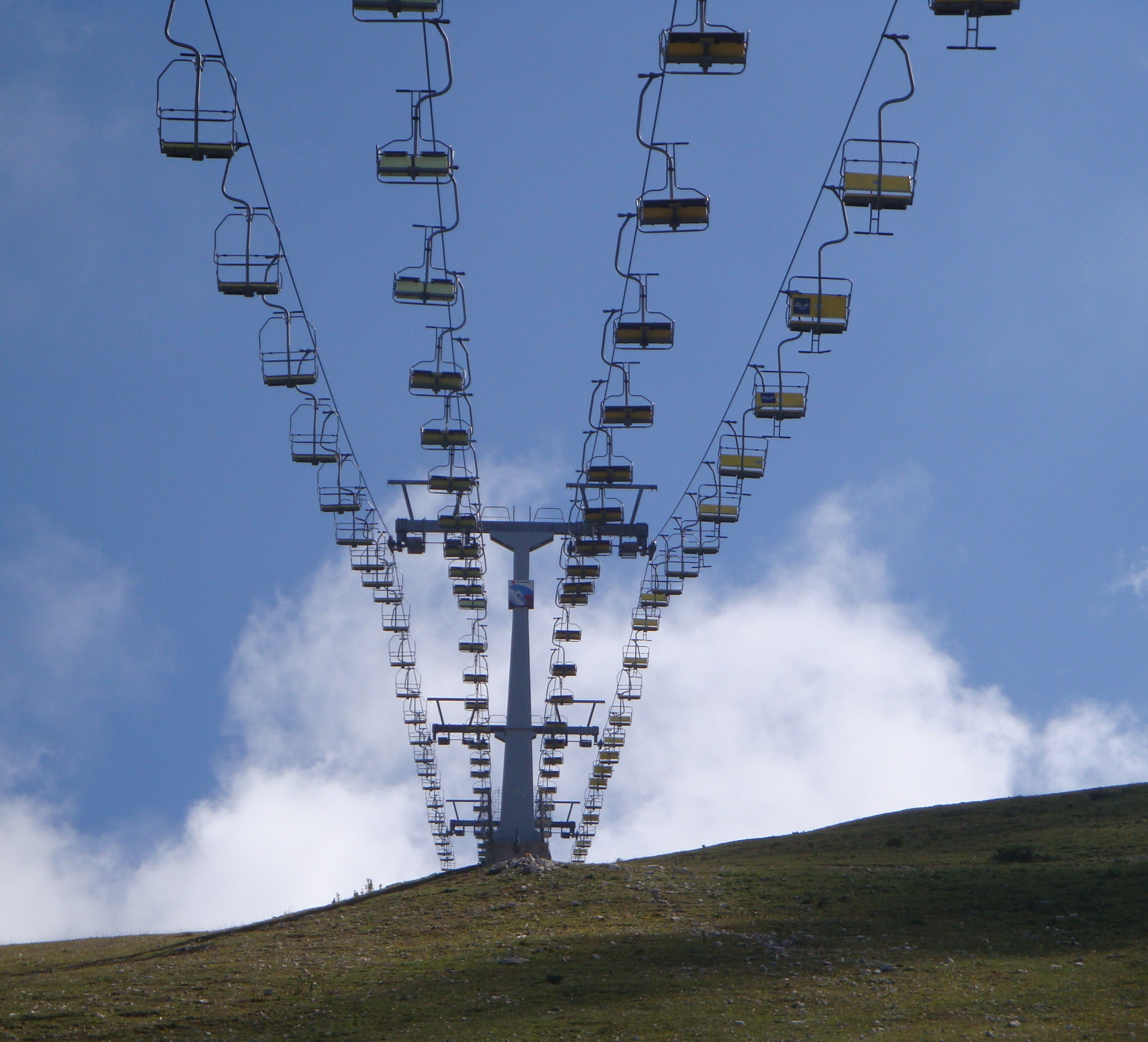
Njivice double doublechair lift seen in summer.

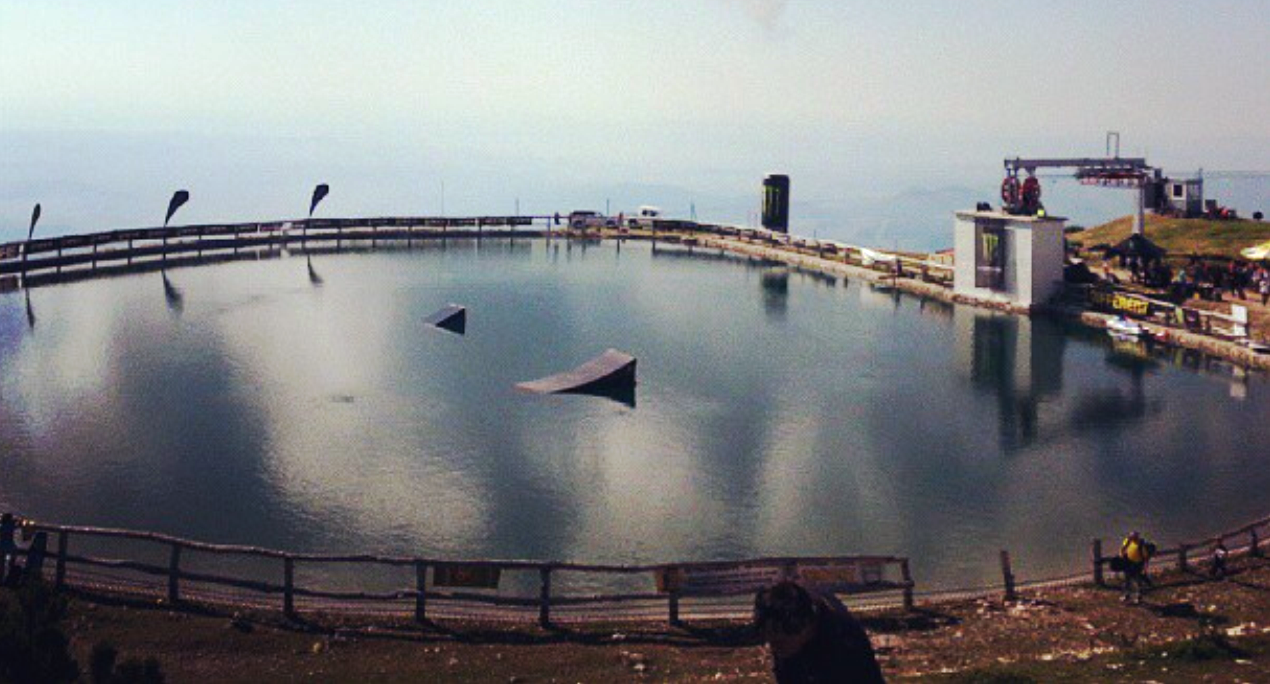
Mountain Wake Jam took place at Zvoh's reservoir in 2013.

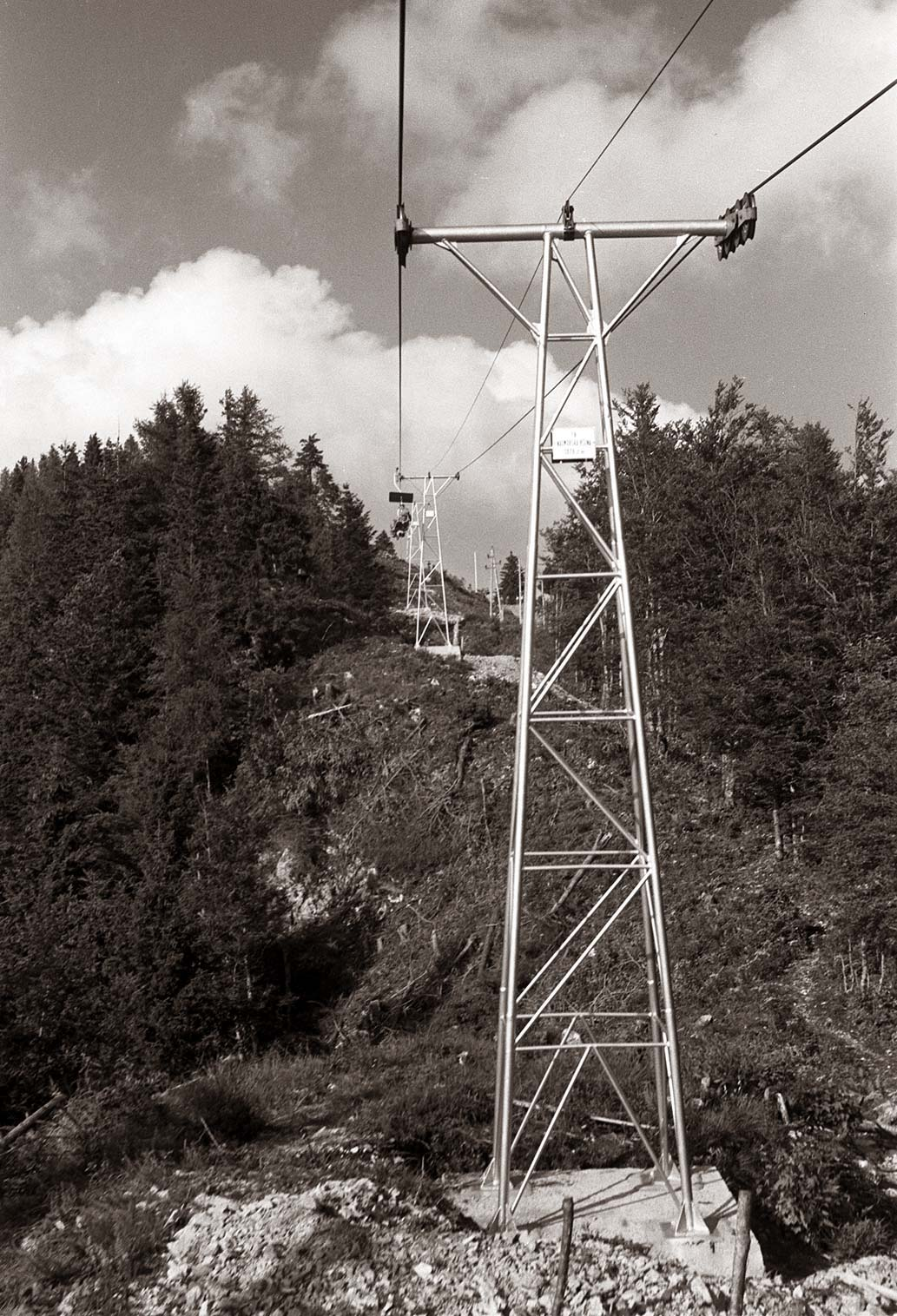
First ski lift in 1958.
