= Alpine skiing at the 2020 Winter Youth Olympics =

Alpine skiing at the III Winter Youth Olympic Games
- Venue: Les Diablerets
- Dates: 10–15 January
- Competitors: 158 from 67 nations

Alpine skiing at the 2020 Winter Youth Olympics took place at the Les Diablerets a ski resort located in Ormont-Dessus, Switzerland, from 10 to 15 January 2020.

== Medal summary ==
=== Medal table ===
* Host nation (Switzerland)

Rank	Nation	Gold	Silver	Bronze	Total
1	Sweden	3	0	1	4
2	Switzerland*	2	3	3	8
3	Austria	2	0	2	4
4	Finland	1	1	0	2
4	France	1	1	0	2
6	Norway	1	0	0	1
7	Germany	0	1	1	2
7	Israel	0	1	1	2
9	Slovenia	0	1	0	1
10	Italy	0	0	1	1
Totals (10 entries)		10	8	9	27

=== Medalists ===
==== Boys' events ====
Event	Gold		Silver		Bronze	
Boys' super-G	Adam Hofstedt; Sweden	54.56	Rok Ažnoh; Slovenia	54.62	Luc Roduit; Switzerland	54.76
Boys' giant slalom	Philip Hoffmann; Austria	2:06.31	Sandro Zurbrügg; Switzerland	2:08.85	Luc Roduit; Switzerland	2:08.89
Boys' slalom	Adam Hofstedt; Sweden	1:16.10	Luc Roduit; Switzerland	1:17.42	Edoardo Saracco; Italy	1:17.78
Boys' combined	Auguste Aulnette; France Mikkel Remsøy; Norway	1:28.41	Not awarded		Adam Hofstedt; Sweden	1:28.69

==== Girls' events ====
Event	Gold		Silver		Bronze	
Girls' super-G	Amélie Klopfenstein; Switzerland	56.27	Caitlin McFarlane; France	56.35	Noa Szőllős; Israel	56.36
Girls' giant slalom	Amélie Klopfenstein; Switzerland	2:08.68	Rosa Pohjolainen; Finland	2:08.82	Amanda Salzgeber; Austria	2:08.83
Girls' slalom	Emma Sahlin; Sweden	1:29.82	Lena Volken; Switzerland	1:30.00	Lara Klein; Germany	1:30.25
Girls' combined	Amanda Salzgeber; Austria	1:33.74	Noa Szőllős; Israel	1:34.69	Amélie Klopfenstein; Switzerland	1:34.85

==== Mixed events ====
Event	Gold	Silver	Bronze
Parallel mixed team	Rosa Pohjolainen; Jaakko Tapanainen; Finland	Lara Klein; Max Geissler-Hauber; Germany	Amanda Salzgeber; Philip Hoffmann; Austria

== Qualification ==
A total of 160 skiers qualified to compete (80 per gender). A NOC could enter a maximum of six skiers (three per gender). The top seven NOC's in the Marc Hodler trophy qualified the maximum six athletes, along with the host nation. All other nations scoring points qualified four athletes (two per gender). All remaining quotas were awarded to NOC's indicating interest and each NOC entered a max of one per gender. Quotas were officially awarded on December 9, 2019.

Event		Quotas	Boys'	Girls'
Host nation		3	Switzerland	Switzerland
Marc Hodler Trophy	Top 7	3	Norway; United States; Austria; Sweden; France; Italy; Slovenia	Norway; United States; Austria; Sweden; France; Italy; Slovenia
Marc Hodler Trophy	Remaining	2	Germany; Finland; Australia; Canada; Great Britain; Argentina	Germany; ~~Belgium~~; Finland; Australia; Canada; ~~Croatia~~; Great Britain; Argentina
Marc Hodler Trophy	Remaining	1	Belgium^{[a]} Croatia^{[a]}	
Quota interest declared		1	Albania; Andorra; Bosnia and Herzegovina; Belarus; Bulgaria; Chile; China; Czech Republic; Estonia; Georgia; Greece; Haiti; Hong Kong; Hungary; Iceland; Iran; Ireland; Japan; Kazakhstan; Kosovo; Latvia; Lebanon; Lithuania; Luxembourg; New Zealand; North Macedonia; Poland; Portugal; Romania; Russia; San Marino; Serbia; Slovakia; South Africa; South Korea; Spain; Thailand; Turkey; Ukraine	Andorra; Bosnia and Herzegovina; Bulgaria; Chile; China; Cyprus; Czech Republic; Denmark; Ecuador; Georgia; Greece; Hong Kong; Hungary; Iceland; Iran; Ireland; Israel; Japan; Kazakhstan; Kosovo; Latvia; Lebanon; Liechtenstein; Lithuania; Mexico; Montenegro; New Zealand; Pakistan; Philippines; Poland; Portugal; Romania; Russia; Serbia; Slovakia; South Africa; South Korea; Spain; Chinese Taipei; Thailand; Trinidad and Tobago; Turkey; Ukraine; Uzbekistan
Total			77	80

^{a} NOC has received less quota than the calculated quota

=== Summary ===
NOC	Boys'	Girls'	Total
Albania	1		1
Andorra	1	1	2
Argentina	2	2	4
Australia	2	2	4
Austria	3	3	6
Belarus	1		1
Belgium	1		1
Bosnia and Herzegovina	1	1	2
Bulgaria	1	1	2
Canada	2	2	4
Chile	1	1	2
China	1	1	2
Croatia	1		1
Cyprus		1	1
Czech Republic	1	1	2
Denmark		1	1
Ecuador		1	1
Estonia	1		1
Finland	2	2	4
France	3	3	6
Georgia	1	1	2
Germany	2	3	5
Great Britain	2	2	4
Greece	1	1	2
Haiti	1		1
Hong Kong	1	1	2
Hungary	1	1	2
Iceland	1	1	2
Iran	1	1	2
Ireland	1	1	2
Israel		1	1
Italy	3	3	6
Japan	1	1	2
Kazakhstan	1	1	2
Kosovo	1	1	2
Latvia	1	1	2
Lebanon	1	1	2
Liechtenstein		1	1
Lithuania	1	1	2
Luxembourg	1		1
Mexico		1	1
Montenegro		1	1
New Zealand	1	1	2
North Macedonia	1		1
Norway	3	3	6
Pakistan		1	1
Philippines		1	1
Poland	1	1	2
Portugal	1	1	2
Romania	1	1	2
Russia	1	1	2
San Marino	1		1
Serbia	1	1	2
Slovakia	1	1	2
Slovenia	3	3	6
South Africa	1	1	2
South Korea	1	1	2
Spain	1	1	2
Sweden	3	3	6
Switzerland	3	3	6
Chinese Taipei		1	1
Thailand	1	1	2
Trinidad and Tobago		1	1
Turkey	1	1	2
Ukraine	1	1	2
United States	3	3	6
Uzbekistan		1	1
Total: 67 NOCs	77	81	158
