= Albania at the Youth Olympics =

Performance of Albania at the Youth Olympic Games

- IOC code: ALB
- NOC: Albanian National Olympic Committee
- Website: nocalbania.org.al (in Albanian)
- Medals: Gold 0 Silver 0 Bronze 0 Total 0

Summer appearances
- 2010; 2014; 2018

Winter appearances
- 2020; 2024

Albania has participated in every edition of the Summer Youth Olympic Games since the inaugural 2010 Games and they participated in the Winter Youth Olympic Games for the first time in the 2020 Games.

== History ==
The Albania under-15 were founded in 2009 for participating in the 2010 Summer Youth Olympics (Football) and the head coach was appointed Sulejman Demollari, former and last native coach of Albania senior side until 2002. Albania under-15 played their first match against Liechtenstein in the semi-final qualification round on 17 October 2009 winning 2–0 with goals scored by Jurgen Vatnikaj and Enes Hoxha. Albania under-15 advanced to the final where they faced Montenegro on 19 October 2009. However, they lost 1–2, missing their participation in the 2010 Summer Youth Olympics finals.

== Medal tables ==
=== Medals by Summer Games ===
Games	Athletes	Gold	Silver	Bronze	Total	Rank
2010 Singapore	4	0	0	0	0	-
(China) 2014 Nanjing	5	0	0	0	0	-
(Argentina) 2018 Buenos Aires	5	0	0	0	0	-
(Senegal) 2026 Dakar						
Total		0	0	0	0	-

=== Medals by Winter Games ===
Games	Athletes	Gold	Silver	Bronze	Total	Rank
(Austria) 2012 Innsbruck	Didn't participate					
(Norway) 2016 Lillehammer	Didn't participate					
(Switzerland) 2020 Lausanne	1	0	0	0	0	-
(South Korea) 2024 Gangwon						
Total		0	0	0	0	-

== Flag bearers ==
#	Games	Season	Flag bearer	Sport
4	2020 Lausanne	Winter	Ezio Leonetti	Alpine skiing
3	2018 Buenos Aires	Summer	Elsidita Selaj	Boxing
2	2014 Nanjing	Summer	Noel Borshi	Swimming
1	2010 Singapore	Summer	Julanda Bacaj	Judo

== See also ==
- Albania at the Olympics
- Albania at the Paralympics
