= Argentina at the 2020 Winter Youth Olympics =

- IOC code: ARG
- NOC: Argentine Olympic Committee
- Website: www.coarg.org.ar

in Lausanne
- Competitors: 16 in 4 sports
- Flag bearer: Tiziano Gravier
- Medals: Gold 0 Silver 0 Bronze 0 Total 0

Winter Youth Olympics appearances (overview)
- 2012; 2016; 2020; 2024

Argentina competed at the 2020 Winter Youth Olympics in Lausanne, Switzerland from 9 to 22 January 2020. Argentina competed with 16 athletes in 4 sports.

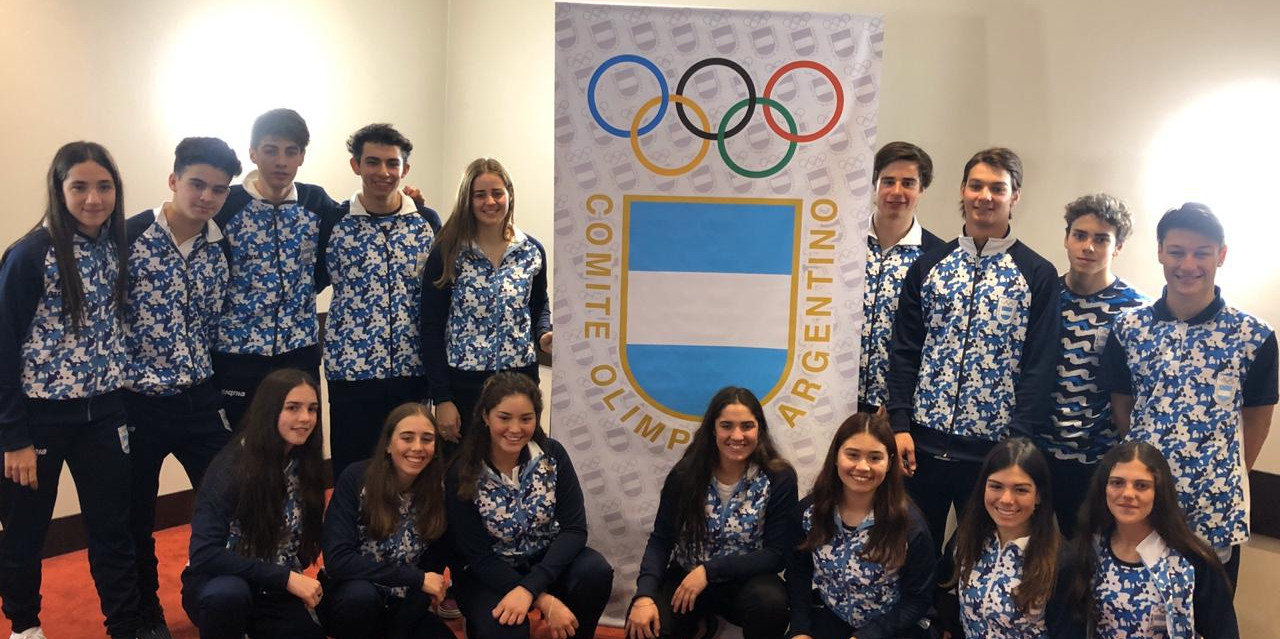
Athletes before the start of the Games.

== Alpine skiing ==
Boys

Athlete	Event	Run 1		Run 2		Total	
Athlete	Event	Time	Rank	Time	Rank	Time	Rank
Bautista Alarcon	Super-G	—N/a				57.30	32
Bautista Alarcon	Combined	57.30	32	DNF			
Bautista Alarcon	Giant slalom	1:09.49	37	DNF			
Bautista Alarcon	Slalom	39.00	20	DNF			
Tiziano Gravier	Super-G	—N/a				55.07	7
Tiziano Gravier	Combined	55.07	7	DNF			
Tiziano Gravier	Giant slalom	1:04.61	6	1:07.64	25	2:12.25	19
Tiziano Gravier	Slalom	39.20	23	41.43	17	1:20.63	15

Girls

Athlete	Event	Run 1		Run 2		Total	
Athlete	Event	Time	Rank	Time	Rank	Time	Rank
Esperanza Pereyra	Super-G	—N/a				1:00.85	35
Esperanza Pereyra	Combined	1:00.85	35	41.50	27	1:42.35	26
Esperanza Pereyra	Giant slalom	DNF					
Esperanza Pereyra	Slalom	50.70	31	49.03	26	1:39.73	26
Sofia Saint Antonin	Super-G	—N/a				1:01.32	38
Sofia Saint Antonin	Combined	1:01.32	38	41.55	28	1:42.87	27
Sofia Saint Antonin	Giant slalom	1:10.70	35	1:09.63	28	2:20.33	27

Mixed

Athlete	Event	Round of 16	Quarterfinals	Semifinals	Final / BM	
Athlete	Event	Opposition Result	Opposition Result	Opposition Result	Opposition Result	Rank
Sofía Saint Antonin; Tiziano Gravier	Team	United States; L 1–3	Did not advance			11

== Cross-country skiing ==
Boys

Athlete	Event	Qualification		Quarterfinal		Semifinal		Final	
Athlete	Event	Time	Rank	Time	Rank	Time	Rank	Time	Rank
Pedro Cotaro	10 km classic	—N/a						36:20.1	75
Pedro Cotaro	Free sprint	4:09.75	76	Did not advance					
Pedro Cotaro	Cross-country cross	5:21.90	75	Did not advance					
Mateo Sauma	10 km classic	—N/a						32:48.7	66
Mateo Sauma	Free sprint	3:54.39	72	Did not advance					
Mateo Sauma	Cross-country cross	5:04.46	66	Did not advance					

Girls

Athlete	Event	Qualification		Quarterfinal		Semifinal		Final	
Athlete	Event	Time	Rank	Time	Rank	Time	Rank	Time	Rank
Agustina Groetzner	5 km classic	—N/a						17:33.5	54
Agustina Groetzner	Free sprint	3:19.38	61	Did not advance					
Agustina Groetzner	Cross-country cross	5:39.95	46	Did not advance					
Zoe Ojeda	5 km classic	—N/a						19:13.6	67
Zoe Ojeda	Free sprint	3:39.41	76	Did not advance					
Zoe Ojeda	Cross-country cross	6:02.20	59	Did not advance					

== Ice hockey ==
=== Mixed 3x3 tournament ===
Boys

- Ruben Esposito

Girls

- Delfina Fattore
- Mila Lutteral

== Snowboarding ==
Snowboard cross

Athlete	Event	Group heats		Semifinal	Final
Athlete	Event	Points	Rank	Position	Position
Dante Vera	Boys' snowboard cross	11	10	Did not advance	
Morena Arroyo	Girls' snowboard cross	9	12	Did not advance	

Athlete	Event	Pre-Heats	Quarterfinals	Semifinal	Final
Athlete	Event	Position	Position	Position	Position
Mixed Team 2 Morena Arroyo (ARG); Sage Stefani (CAN); Jack Morrow (CAN); Jacob Walper (CAN)	Team snowboard ski cross	Bye	3	Did not advance	
Mixed Team 7 Teodora Ilieva (BUL); Josefina Valdes (CHI); Oscar Trygg (NOR); Dante Vera (ARG)	Team snowboard ski cross	4	Did not advance		

Halfpipe, Slopestyle, & Big Air

Athlete	Event	Qualification				Final				
Athlete	Event	Run 1	Run 2	Best	Rank	Run 1	Run 2	Run 3	Best	Rank
Valentín Moreno	Boys' big air	5.75	41.25	41.25	16	Did not advance				
Valentín Moreno	Boys' halfpipe	30.66	34.33	34.33	16	Did not advance				
Valentín Moreno	Boys' slopestyle	12.33	2.33	12.33	20	Did not advance				
Maria Azul Chavez	Girls' big air	20.66	12.66	20.66	16	Did not advance				
Maria Azul Chavez	Girls' halfpipe	33.66	15.00	33.66	12	Did not advance				
Morena Poggi	Girls' big air	40.33	14.00	40.33	12 Q	7.50	16.75	35.50	52.25	9
Morena Poggi	Girls' slopestyle	19.00	12.50	19.00	17	Did not advance				

== See also ==
- Argentina at the 2020 Summer Olympics
