= Slovenia at the 2020 Winter Youth Olympics =

- IOC code: SLO
- NOC: Slovenian Olympic Committee
- Website: www.olympic.si

in Lausanne
- Competitors: 39
- Medals: Gold 0 Silver 2 Bronze 0 Total 2

Winter Youth Olympics appearances
- 2012; 2016; 2020; 2024

Slovenia competed at the 2020 Winter Youth Olympics in Lausanne, Switzerland from 9 to 22 January 2020.

== Medalists ==
Medal	Name	Sport	Event	Date
Gold	Maks Perčič	Ice hockey	Boys' 3x3 mixed tournament	15 January
Silver	Rok Ažnoh	Alpine skiing	Boys' super-G	10 January
Silver	Tjaš Lesničar	Ice hockey	Boys' 3x3 mixed tournament	15 January
Silver	Mark Hafnar	Ski jumping	Boys' normal hill individual	19 January

== Alpine skiing ==
Boys

Athlete	Event	Run 1		Run 2		Total	
Athlete	Event	Time	Rank	Time	Rank	Time	Rank
Rok Ažnoh	Super-G	—N/a				54.62	2nd place, silver medalist(s)
Rok Ažnoh	Combined	54.62	2	DNF			
Rok Ažnoh	Giant slalom	DNF					
Rok Ažnoh	Slalom						
Martin Križaj	Super-G	—N/a				55.61	16
Martin Križaj	Combined	55.61	16	DNF			
Martin Križaj	Giant slalom	1:04.00	3	DNF			
Martin Križaj	Slalom						
Rok Stojanovič	Super-G	—N/a				57.03	31
Rok Stojanovič	Combined	57.03	31	35.41	17	1:32.44	16
Rok Stojanovič	Giant slalom	1:06.70	27	1:06.54	22	2:13.24	24
Rok Stojanovič	Slalom						

Girls

Athlete	Event	Run 1		Run 2		Total	
Athlete	Event	Time	Rank	Time	Rank	Time	Rank
Lina Knifič	Super-G	—N/a				57.85	19
Lina Knifič	Combined	57.85	19	40.36	21	1:38.21	18
Lina Knifič	Giant slalom	DNF					
Lina Knifič	Slalom						
Nika Murovec	Super-G	—N/a				59.12	29
Nika Murovec	Combined	59.12	29	40.83	24	1:39.95	22
Nika Murovec	Giant slalom	DNF					
Nika Murovec	Slalom						
Anja Oplotnik	Super-G	—N/a				1:01.19	37
Anja Oplotnik	Combined	1:01.19	37	39.28	15	1:40.47	24
Anja Oplotnik	Giant slalom	DNF					
Anja Oplotnik	Slalom						

== Biathlon ==
Boys

Athlete	Event	Time	Misses	Rank
Drejc Trojer	Sprint	22:00.0	4 (2+2)	37
Drejc Trojer	Individual	37:32.3	3 (0+3+0+0)	16
Mark Vozelj	Sprint	22:20.7	5 (3+2)	44
Mark Vozelj	Individual	38:17.6	6 (1+3+1+1)	30
Jaša Zidar	Sprint	21:42.1	3 (3+0)	31
Jaša Zidar	Individual	38:06.9	5 (1+1+1+2)	25

Girls

Athlete	Event	Time	Misses	Rank
Kaja Marič	Sprint	19:09.0	2 (1+1)	5
Kaja Marič	Individual	41:35.4	13 (3+3+3+4)	68
Lena Repinc	Sprint	20:07.8	3 (1+2)	22
Lena Repinc	Individual	39:25.7	10 (1+3+3+3)	52
Kaja Zorc	Sprint	19:22.9	1 (0+1)	6
Kaja Zorc	Individual	38:27.3	8 (1+3+2+2)	41

Mixed

Athletes	Event	Time	Misses	Rank
Lena Repinc; Jaša Zidar	Single mixed relay	47:04.3	4+16	19
Kaja Zorc; Kaja Marič; Drejc Trojer; Mark Vozelj	Mixed relay	1:16:36.7	3+16	11

== Curling ==
Slovenia qualified a mixed team of four athletes.

Mixed team

Team	Event	Group stage						Quarterfinal	Semifinal	Final / BM	
Team	Event	Opposition Score	Opposition Score	Opposition Score	Opposition Score	Opposition Score	Rank	Opposition Score	Opposition Score	Opposition Score	Rank
Bine Sever; Liza Gregori; Jakob Omerzel; Sara Rigler	Mixed team	New Zealand; L 4–8	Norway; W 6–5	France; W 8–7	Great Britain; L 2–6	Turkey; L 2–4	5	Did not advance			20

Mixed doubles

Athletes	Event	Round of 48	Round of 24	Round of 12	Round of 6	Semifinals	Final / BM	
Athletes	Event	Opposition Result	Opposition Result	Opposition Result	Opposition Result	Opposition Result	Opposition Result	Rank
	Mixed doubles							

== See also ==
- Slovenia at the 2020 Summer Olympics
