= Alpine skiing at the 2020 Winter Youth Olympics – Boys' super-G =

Boys' super-G at the III Winter Youth Olympic Games
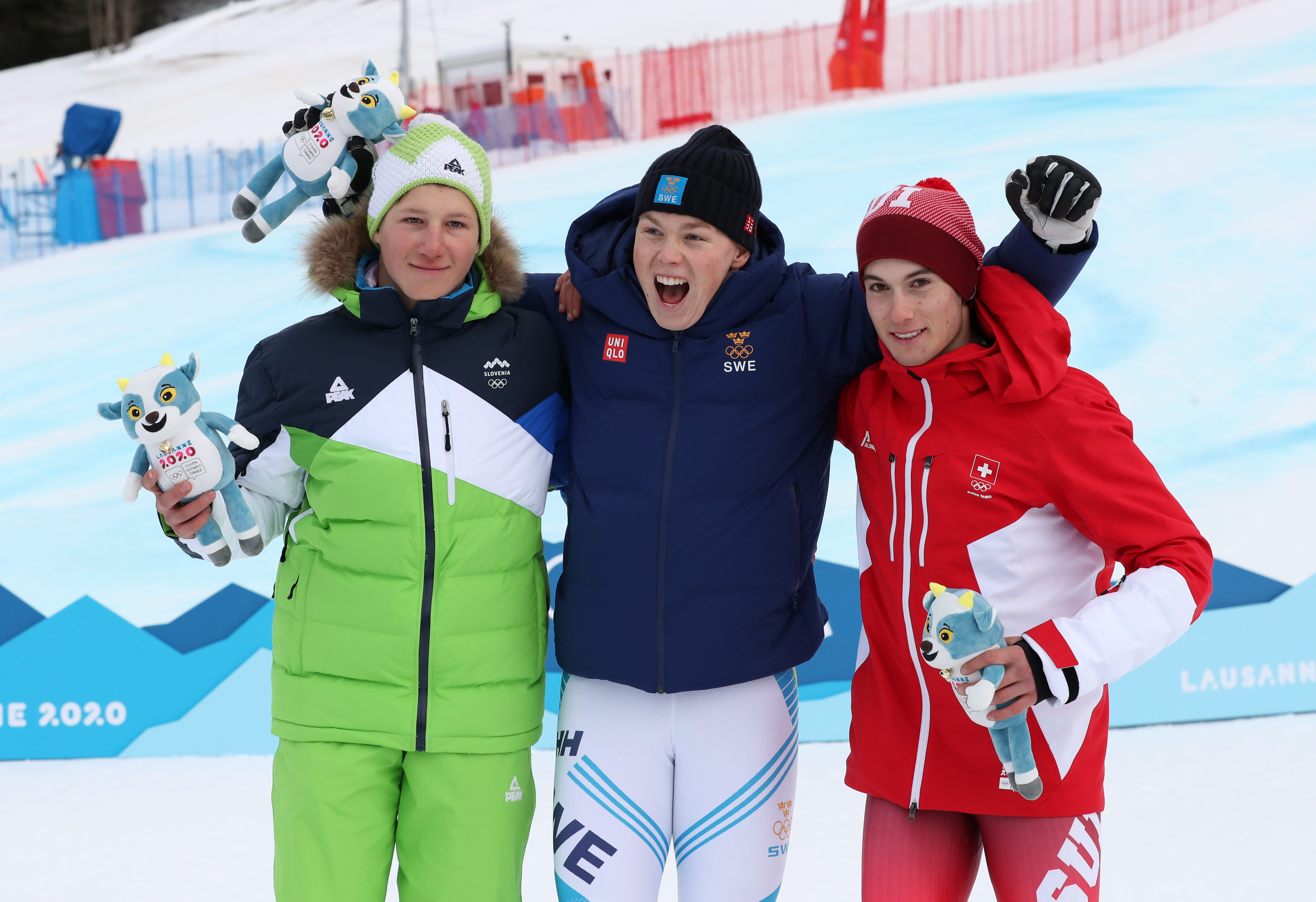
- Venue: Les Diablerets, Switzerland
- Date: 10 January
- Competitors: 61 from 39 nations
- Winning time: 54.56

Medalists
1st place, gold medalist(s)		Adam Hofstedt	Sweden
2nd place, silver medalist(s)		Rok Ažnoh	Slovenia
3rd place, bronze medalist(s)		Luc Roduit	Switzerland

The boys' Super-G competition of the 2020 Winter Youth Olympics was held at the Les Diablerets Alpine Centre, Switzerland, on Friday, 10 January.

== Results ==
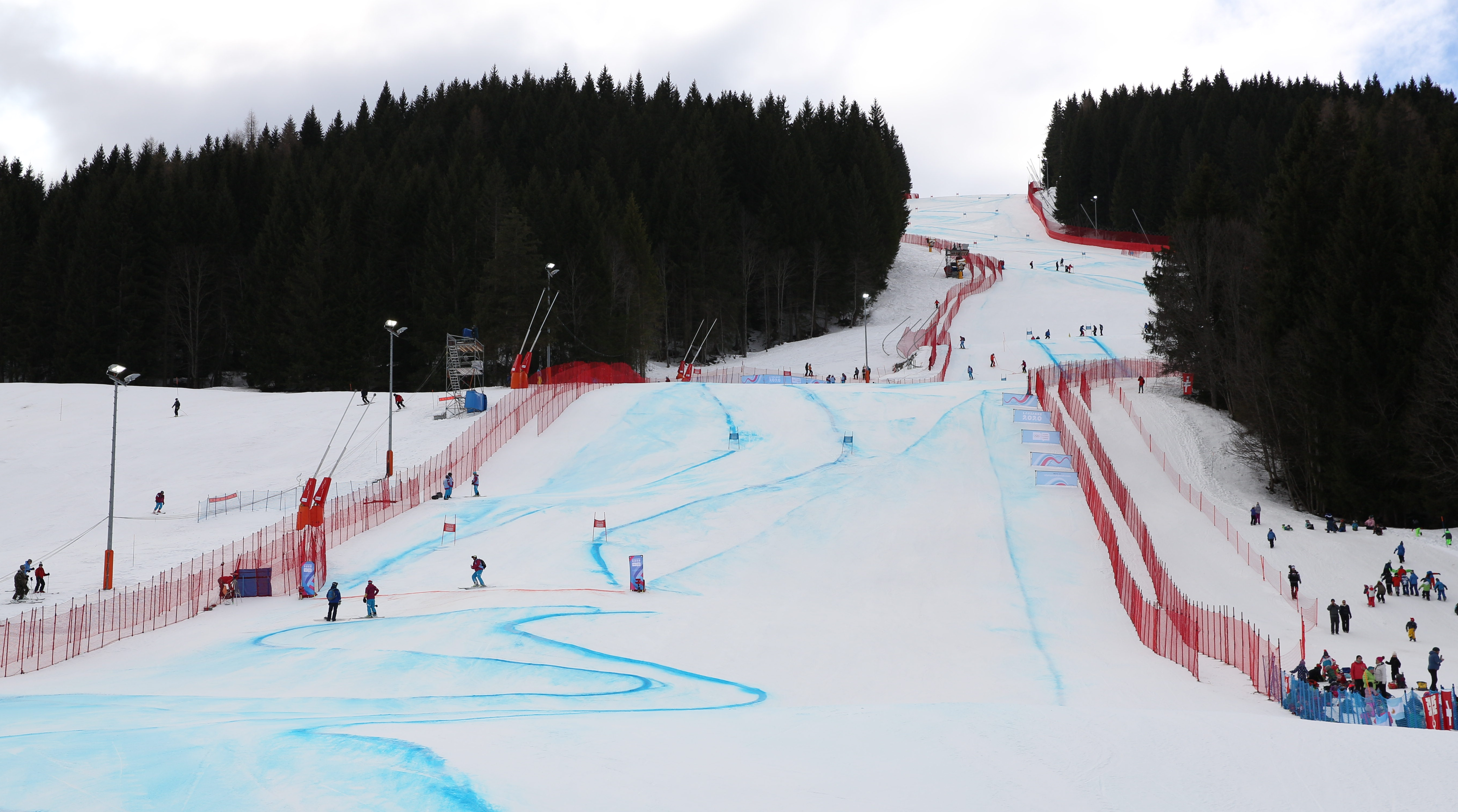
Les Diablerets Alpine Centre

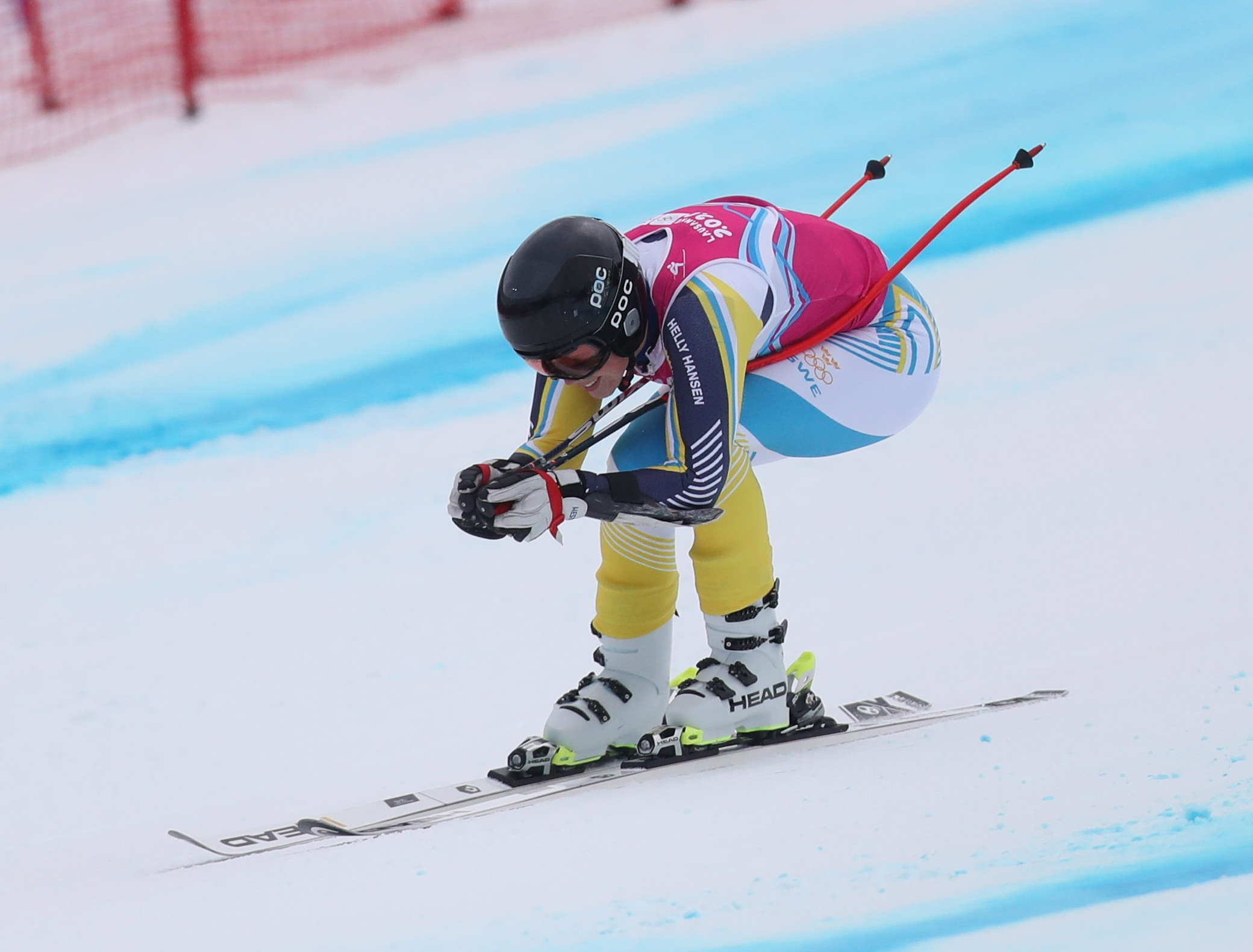
Adam Hofstedt

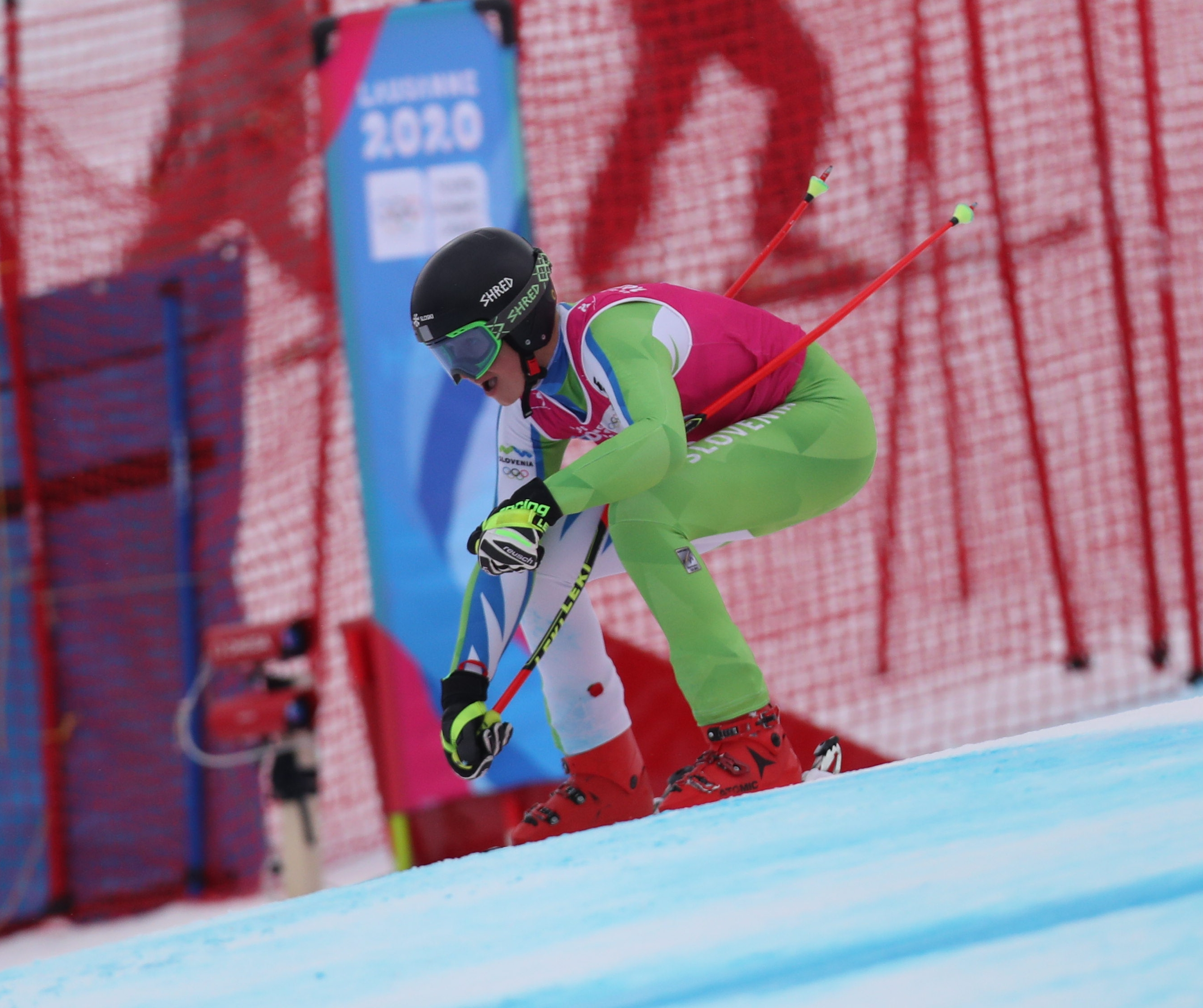
Rok Ažnoh

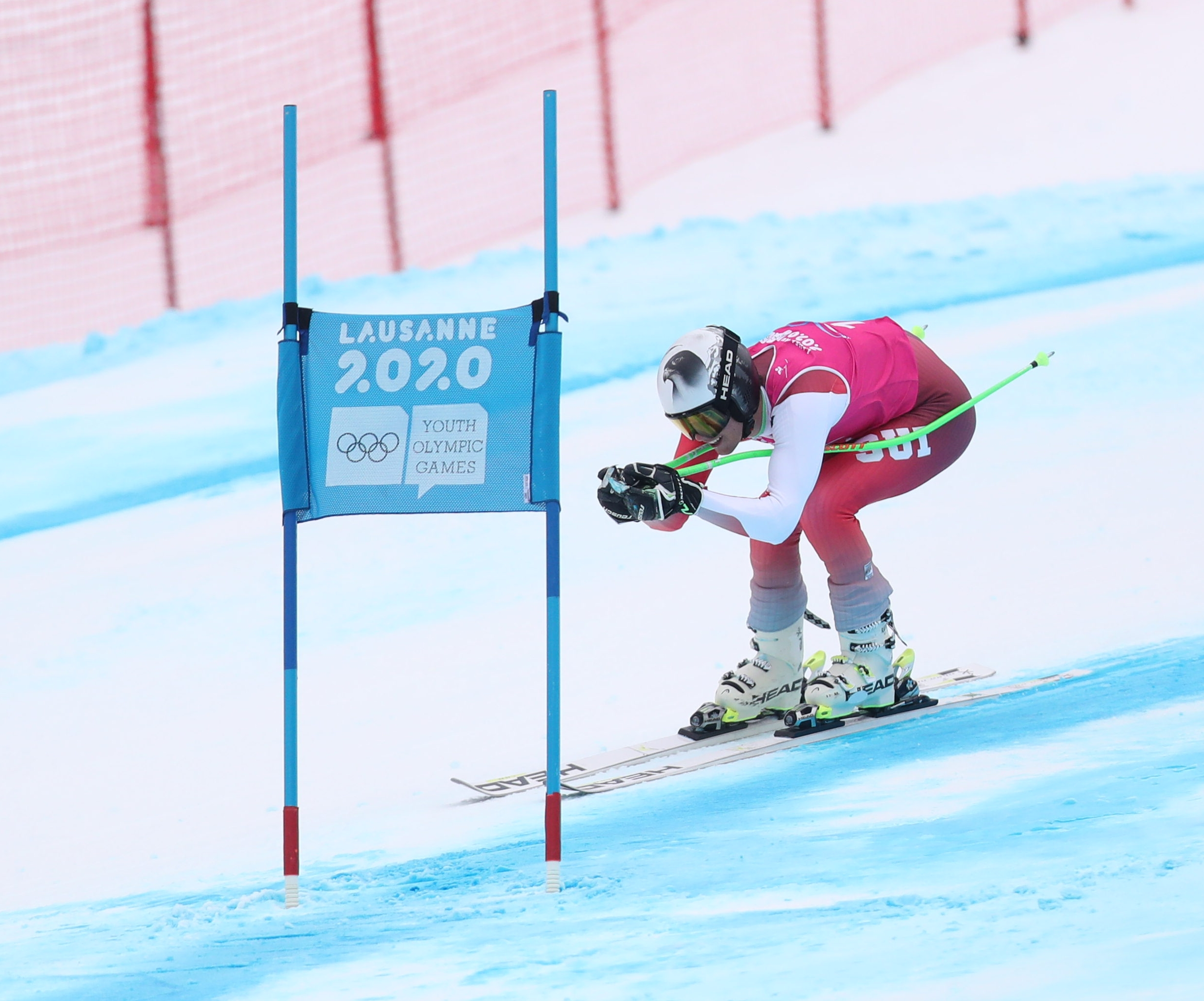
Luc Roduit

The race was started at 13:30.

Rank	Bib	Name	Country	Time	Difference
1st place, gold medalist(s)	11	Adam Hofstedt	Sweden	54.56	
2nd place, silver medalist(s)	8	Rok Ažnoh	Slovenia	54.62	+0.06
3rd place, bronze medalist(s)	17	Luc Roduit	Switzerland	54.76	+0.20
4	10	Victor Bessière	France	54.80	+0.24
5	3	David Kubeš	Czech Republic	55.01	+0.45
6	15	Mikkel Remsøy	Norway	55.04	+0.48
7	20	Tiziano Gravier	Argentina	55.07	+0.51
8	13	Simen Sellæg	Norway	55.21	+0.65
9	37	Auguste Aulnette	France	55.27	+0.71
10	24	Philip Hoffmann	Austria	55.35	+0.79
11	58	Lukas Ermeskog	Sweden	55.38	+0.82
12	14	Marinus Sennhofer	Germany	55.40	+0.84
13	2	Baptiste Sambuis	France	55.44	+0.88
14	5	Silvano Gini	Switzerland	55.49	+0.93
15	7	Marco Abbruzzese	Italy	55.52	+0.96
16	29	Martin Križaj	Slovenia	55.61	+1.05
16	16	Gian Maria Illariuzzi	Italy	55.61	+1.05
18	22	Max Geissler-Hauber	Germany	55.83	+1.27
19	4	Sandro Zurbrügg	Switzerland	55.85	+1.29
20	21	Trent Pennington	United States	55.88	+1.32
21	28	Teo Žampa	Slovakia	55.92	+1.36
22	6	Jaakko Tapanainen	Finland	55.98	+1.42
23	40	Thomas Hoffman	Australia	56.05	+1.49
24	18	Valentin Lotter	Austria	56.13	+1.57
25	9	Daniel Gillis	United States	56.32	+1.76
26	30	Jack Cunningham	Great Britain	56.36	+1.80
27	33	Nicolás Pirozzi	Chile	56.76	+2.20
28	25	Konstantin Stoilov	Bulgaria	56.77	+2.21
29	19	Roman Zverian	Russia	56.80	+2.24
30	31	Edoardo Saracco	Italy	56.86	+2.30
31	26	Rok Stojanovič	Slovenia	57.03	+2.47
32	34	Bautista Alarcón	Argentina	57.30	+2.74
33	42	Bartłomiej Sanetra	Poland	57.38	+2.82
34	27	Harrison Messenger	New Zealand	57.59	+3.03
35	32	Taras Filiak	Ukraine	57.60	+3.04
36	38	Juan Sánchez	Spain	57.62	+3.06
37	39	Ty Acosta	Andorra	57.90	+3.34
38	46	Oskar Gillberg	Sweden	58.22	+3.66
39	41	Louis Latulippe	Canada	58.24	+3.68
40	36	Mackenzie Wood	Canada	58.27	+3.71
41	44	Tvrtko Ljutić	Croatia	58.45	+3.89
42	57	Ohra Kimishima	Japan	58.52	+3.96
42	48	Andrei Stănescu	Romania	58.52	+3.96
44	54	Louis Masquelier	Belgium	58.58	+4.02
45	35	Matthew Ryan	Ireland	58.70	+4.14
46	60	Maxx Parys	United States	59.01	+4.45
47	49	Joey Steggall	Australia	59.38	+4.82
48	43	Ezio Leonetti	Albania	60.97	+5.63
49	47	Uglješa Pantelić	Serbia	60.97	+6.13
50	52	Vladislav Shlemov	Kazakhstan	1:01.15	+6.59
51	61	Gauti Guðmundsson	Iceland	1:01.32	+6.76
52	51	Christos Marmarellis	Greece	1:01.73	+7.17
53	59	Kim Si-won	South Korea	1:01.96	+7.40
54	53	Tamás Trunk	Hungary	1:02.10	+7.54
55	45	Derin Berkin	Turkey	1:02.61	+8.05
56	55	Mirko Lazarevski	North Macedonia	1:03.43	+8.87
57	50	Roham Saba	Iran	1:04.45	+9.89
	1	Sindre Myklebust	Norway	Did not finish	
	23	Robert Holmes	Great Britain	Did not finish	
	62	Eduard Hallberg	Finland	Did not finish	
	12	Vincent Wieser	Austria	Disqualified	
	56	Mackenson Florindo	Haiti	Did not start	
