= Alpine skiing at the 2020 Winter Youth Olympics – Girls' combined =

Girls' combined at the III Winter Youth Olympic Games
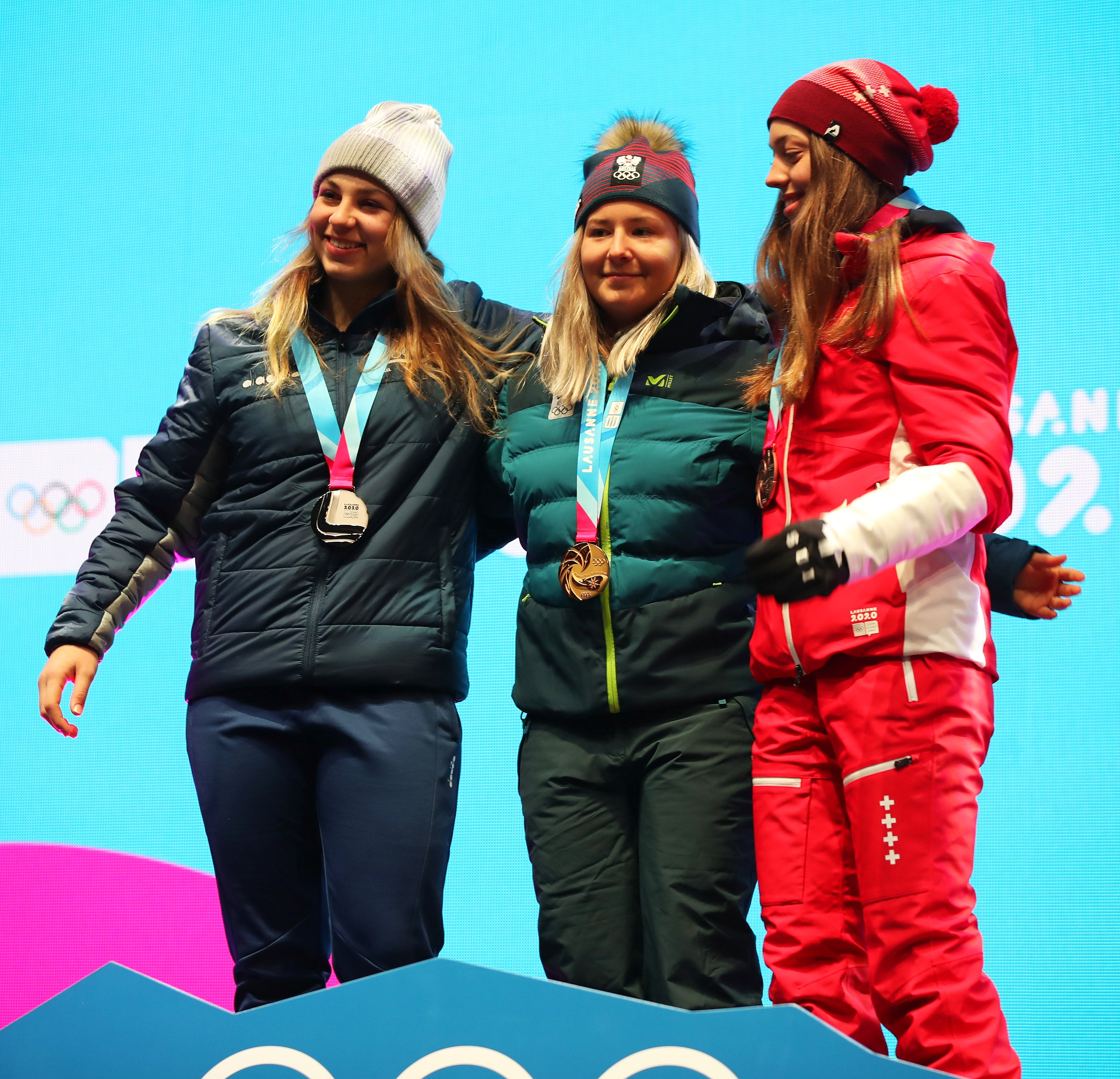
- Venue: Les Diablerets, Switzerland
- Date: 10 January (Super-G); 11 January (slalom)
- Competitors: 59 from 38 nations
- Winning time: 1:33.74

Medalists
1st place, gold medalist(s)		Amanda Salzgeber	Austria
2nd place, silver medalist(s)		Noa Szollos	Israel
3rd place, bronze medalist(s)		Amélie Klopfenstein	Switzerland

The girls' combined competition of the 2020 Winter Youth Olympics was held at the Les Diablerets Alpine Centre, Switzerland, on Friday, 10 January (Super-G) and Saturday, 11 January (slalom). The results of the Super-G competition will be counted towards the combined result.

== Results ==
The Super-G was started on 10 January at 10:15. The slalom was started on 11 January at 12:30.

Rank	Bib	Name	Country	Super-G	Rank	Slalom	Rank	Total	Diff.
1st place, gold medalist(s)	11	Amanda Salzgeber	Austria	56.40	4	37.34	2	1:33.74	
2nd place, silver medalist(s)	26	Noa Szollos	Israel	56.36	3	38.33	10	1:34.69	+0.95
3rd place, bronze medalist(s)	28	Amélie Klopfenstein	Switzerland	56.27	1	38.58	12	1:34.85	+1.11
4	32	Rebeka Jančová	Slovakia	56.99	8	37.88	6	1:34.87	+1.13
5	22	Sophie Mathiou	Italy	57.29	12	37.80	5	1:35.09	+1.35
6	17	Wilma Marklund	Sweden	57.32	13	37.78	4	1:35.10	+1.36
7	13	Maria Niederndorfer	Austria	56.97	7	38.19	8	1:35.16	+1.42
8	3	Katharina Haas	Germany	57.91	21	37.42	3	1:35.33	+1.59
9	18	Rosa Pohjolainen	Finland	58.42	24	36.92	1	1:35.34	+1.60
10	10	Delia Durrer	Switzerland	57.35	14	38.25	9	1:35.60	+1.86
11	6	Malin Sofie Sund	Norway	57.51	17	38.17	7	1:35.68	+1.94
12	57	Emma Resnick	United States	57.21	11	39.00	14	1:36.21	+2.47
13	1	Lara Klein	Germany	57.97	22	38.42	11	1:36.39	+2.65
14	14	Alica Calaba	Italy	56.75	6	40.10	20	1:36.85	+3.11
15	37	Zoja Grbović	Serbia	57.13	10	40.09	19	1:37.22	+3.48
16	24	Chiara Pogneaux	France	58.72	27	38.64	13	1:37.36	+3.62
17	40	Zita Tóth	Hungary	57.47	16	40.47	22	1:37.94	+4.20
18	9	Lina Knifič	Slovenia	57.85	20	40.36	21	1:38.21	+4.47
19	34	Christina Bühler	Liechtenstein	58.52	25	39.81	17	1:38.33	+4.59
20	21	Cathinka Lunder	Norway	57.85	19	40.89	25	1:38.74	+5.00
21	2	Matilde Schwencke	Chile	58.67	26	40.47	22	1:39.14	+5.40
22	4	Nika Murovec	Slovenia	59.12	29	40.83	24	1:39.95	+6.21
23	29	Sophie Foster	Great Britain	1:00.33	33	39.98	18	1:40.31	+6.57
24	27	Anja Oplotnik	Slovenia	1:01.19	37	39.28	15	1:40.47	+6.73
25	56	Anastasia Trofimova	Russia	1:01.14	36	39.70	16	1:40.84	+7.10
26	46	Esperanza Pereyra	Argentina	1:00.85	35	41.50	27	1:42.35	+8.61
27	44	Sofía Saint Antonin	Argentina	1:01.32	38	41.55	28	1:42.87	+9.13
28	50	Yuka Wakatsuki	Japan	1:02.38	41	41.47	26	1:43.85	+10.11
29	48	Diana Andreea Renţea	Romania	1:01.88	40	43.30	31	1:45.18	+11.44
30	52	Mia Nuriah Freudweiler	Pakistan	1:04.98	46	41.77	29	1:46.75	+13.01
31	45	Kateryna Shepilenko	Ukraine	1:04.14	44	42.88	30	1:47.02	+13.28
32	47	Abigail Vieira	Trinidad and Tobago	1:02.58	42	44.97	32	1:47.55	+13.81
	5	Emma Sahlin	Sweden	57.39	15	Did not finish			
	7	Hanna Aronsson Elfman	Sweden	56.70	5	Did not finish			
	19	Teresa Fritzenwallner	Austria	57.11	9	Did not finish			
	20	Maisa Kivimäki	Finland	59.55	31	Did not finish			
	30	Daisi Daniels	Great Britain	57.82	18	Did not finish			
	31	Annette Belfrond	Italy	58.08	23	Did not finish			
	36	Caitlin McFarlane	France	56.35	2	Did not finish			
	38	Zoe Michael	Australia	1:03.02	43	Did not finish			
	39	Adalbjörg Lilly Hauksdóttir	Iceland	1:00.51	34	Did not finish			
	42	Jana Suau	Spain	59.64	32	Did not finish			
	43	Vanina Guerillot	Portugal	59.10	28	Did not finish			
	49	Gabriela Hopek	Poland	1:05.37	47	Did not finish			
	53	Alexandra Troitskaya	Kazakhstan	1:04.42	45	Did not finish			
	59	Maria Nikoleta Kaltsogianni	Greece	1:12.35	50	Did not finish			
	60	Isabella Davis	Australia	1:05.52	48	Did not finish			
	61	Daniela Payen	Mexico	1:06.17	49	Did not finish			
	62	Lee Hae-un	South Korea	1:01.61	39	Did not finish			
	35	Carla Mijares	Andorra	59.12	29	Disqualified			
	8	Lauren Macuga	United States	Did not finish					
	12	Barbora Nováková	Czech Republic	Did not finish					
	15	Alice Marchessault	Canada	Did not finish					
	16	Nicola Rountree-Williams	United States	Did not finish					
	23	Alizée Dahon	France	Did not finish					
	33	Lena Volken	Switzerland	Did not finish					
	41	Kristiane Rør Madsen	Denmark	Did not finish					
	55	Sara Madelene Marøy	Norway	Did not finish					
	58	Julia Zlatkova	Bulgaria	Did not finish					
	25	Sarah Brown	Canada	Did not start					
	51	Artemis Hoseyni	Iran	Did not start					
	54	Sarah Escobar	Ecuador	Did not start					
