= Alpine skiing at the 2020 Winter Youth Olympics – Boys' giant slalom =

Boys' giant slalom at the III Winter Youth Olympic Games
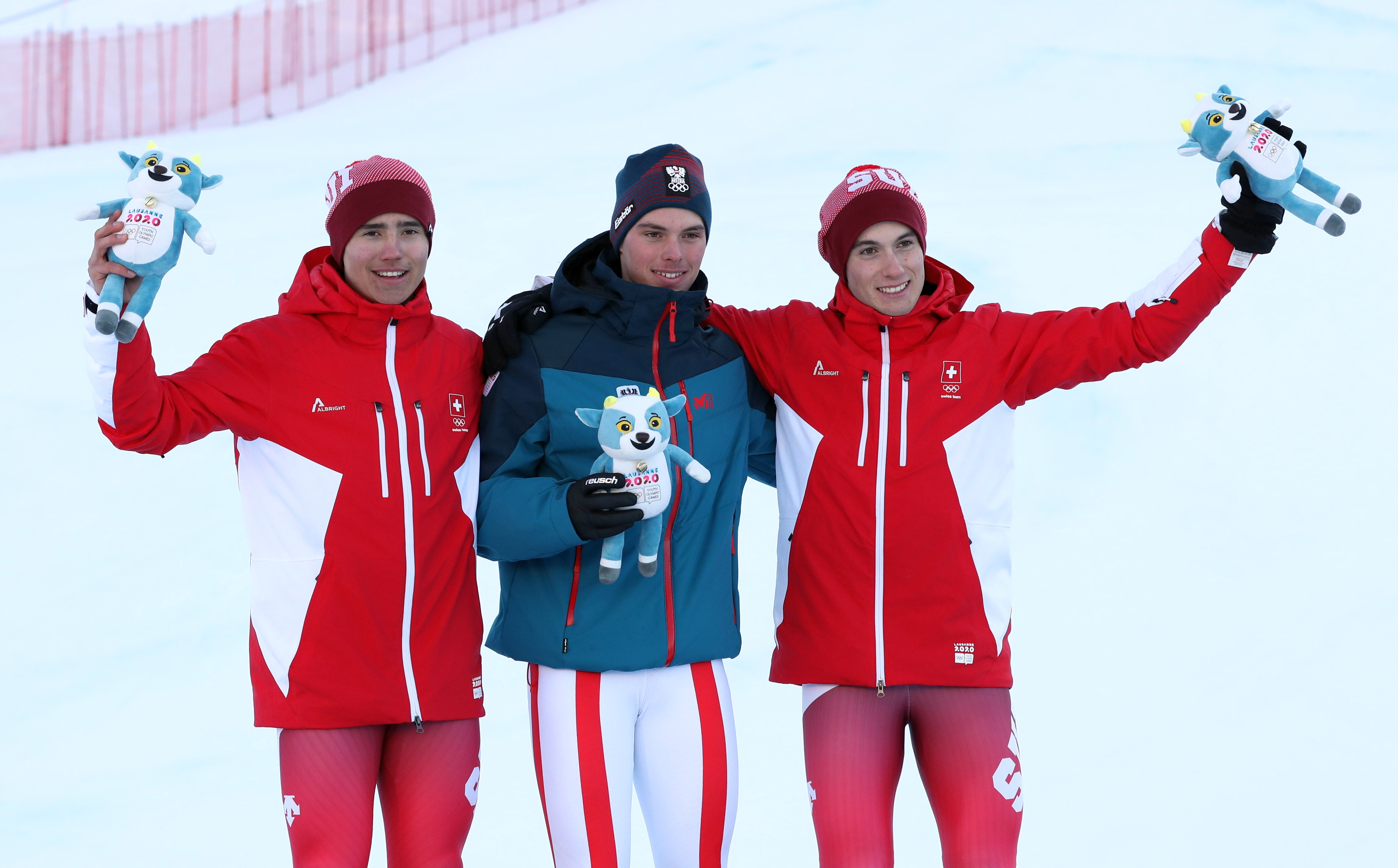
- Venue: Les Diablerets, Switzerland
- Date: 13 January
- Competitors: 77 from 55 nations

Medalists
1st place, gold medalist(s)		Philip Hoffmann	Austria
2nd place, silver medalist(s)		Sandro Zurbrügg	Switzerland
3rd place, bronze medalist(s)		Luc Roduit	Switzerland

The boys' giant slalom competition of the 2020 Winter Youth Olympics was held at the Les Diablerets Alpine Centre, Switzerland, on 13 January.

== Results ==
The race was started at 11:30 (Run 1) and 14:15 (Run 2).

Rank	Bib	Name	Country	Run 1	Rank	Run 2	Rank	Total	Diff.
1st place, gold medalist(s)	1	Philip Hoffmann	Austria	1:02.50	1	1:03.81	1	2:06.31	
2nd place, silver medalist(s)	22	Sandro Zurbrügg	Switzerland	1:04.64	7	1:04.21	3	2:08.85	+2.54
3rd place, bronze medalist(s)	26	Luc Roduit	Switzerland	1:04.68	8	1:04.21	3	2:08.89	+2.58
4	17	Lukas Ermeskog	Sweden	1:05.13	15	1:03.83	2	2:08.96	+2.65
5	4	Adam Hofstedt	Sweden	1:03.19	2	1:05.98	17	2:09.17	+2.86
6	6	Sindre Myklebust	Norway	1:04.43	5	1:04.82	6	2:09.25	+2.94
7	24	Baptiste Sambuis	France	1:04.84	10	1:04.42	5	2:09.26	+2.95
8	5	Vincent Wieser	Austria	1:04.26	4	1:05.09	9	2:09.35	+3.04
9	20	Edoardo Saracco	Italy	1:05.06	13	1:04.88	7	2:09.94	+3.63
10	32	Jaakko Tapanainen	Finland	1:04.90	11	1:05.22	10	2:10.12	+3.81
10	27	Marinus Sennhofer	Germany	1:05.05	12	1:05.07	8	2:10.12	+3.81
12	2	Victor Bessière	France	1:04.82	9	1:05.54	13	2:10.36	+4.05
13	16	David Kubeš	Czech Republic	1:05.14	16	1:05.44	12	2:10.58	+4.27
14	13	Nicolás Pirozzi	Chile	1:05.17	17	1:05.62	14	2:10.79	+4.48
15	15	Marco Abbruzzese	Italy	1:05.32	18	1:05.78	16	2:11.10	+4.79
16	34	Konstantin Stoilov	Bulgaria	1:05.39	19	1:05.72	15	2:11.11	+4.80
17	28	Trent Pennington	United States	1:05.12	14	1:06.20	19	2:11.32	+5.01
18	46	Bartłomiej Sanetra	Poland	1:06.59	26	1:05.26	11	2:11.85	+5.54
19	14	Tiziano Gravier	Argentina	1:04.61	6	1:07.64	25	2:12.25	+5.94
20	37	Robert Holmes	Great Britain	1:06.25	23	1:06.03	18	2:12.28	+5.97
21	45	Eduard Hallberg	Finland	1:06.47	25	1:06.37	21	2:12.84	+6.53
22	29	Ty Acosta	Andorra	1:06.14	22	1:06.77	23	2:12.91	+6.60
23	33	Louis Masquelier	Belgium	1:05.60	20	1:07.39	24	2:12.99	+6.68
24	40	Rok Stojanovič	Slovenia	1:06.70	27	1:06.54	22	2:13.24	+6.93
25	42	Tvrtko Ljutić	Croatia	1:07.06	30	1:06.21	20	2:13.27	+6.96
26	43	Teo Žampa	Slovakia	1:05.98	21	1:09.03	28	2:15.01	+8.70
27	44	Juan Sánchez	Spain	1:06.98	29	1:08.45	26	2:15.43	+9.12
28	47	Kim Si-won	South Korea	1:08.30	32	1:09.56	30	2:17.86	+11.55
29	56	Gauti Guðmundsson	Iceland	1:09.13	36	1:08.97	27	2:18.10	+11.79
30	51	Derin Berkin	Turkey	1:08.94	34	1:09.67	31	2:18.61	+12.30
31	53	Uglješa Pantelić	Serbia	1:08.67	33	1:09.97	33	2:18.64	+12.33
32	55	Taras Filiak	Ukraine	1:09.56	38	1:09.19	29	2:18.75	+12.44
33	59	Andrei Stănescu	Romania	1:09.66	39	1:09.90	32	2:19.56	+13.25
34	54	Joey Steggall	Australia	1:09.09	35	1:10.48	34	2:19.57	+13.26
35	58	Christos Marmarellis	Greece	1:11.10	41	1:10.90	35	2:22.00	+15.69
36	61	Vladislav Shlemov	Kazakhstan	1:11.69	42	1:11.38	38	2:23.07	+16.76
37	62	Joachim Keghian	Luxembourg	1:12.10	43	1:10.98	36	2:23.08	+16.77
38	50	Tamás Trunk	Hungary	1:10.98	40	1:12.20	42	2:23.18	+16.87
39	52	Kristofers Gulbis	Latvia	1:12.87	46	1:11.26	37	2:24.13	+17.82
40	77	Hans Markus Danilas	Estonia	1:12.74	45	1:11.51	39	2:24.25	+17.94
41	65	Mirko Lazarevski	North Macedonia	1:12.73	44	1:11.63	40	2:24.36	+18.05
42	60	Ezio Leonetti	Albania	1:13.85	48	1:12.01	41	2:25.86	+19.55
43	57	Yi Xiaoyang	China	1:13.80	47	1:13.64	43	2:27.44	+21.13
44	70	Miguel Almirall Perez	Hong Kong	1:14.85	50	1:14.01	44	2:28.86	+22.55
45	68	Alberto Tamagnini	San Marino	1:14.05	49	1:14.86	46	2:28.91	+22.60
46	63	Alen Bičakčić	Bosnia and Herzegovina	1:15.09	51	1:14.06	45	2:29.15	+22.84
47	72	Manuel Ramos	Portugal	1:16.59	54	1:15.48	47	2:32.07	+25.76
48	64	Roham Saba	Iran	1:15.87	52	1:18.06	50	2:33.93	+27.62
49	76	Maksim Davydouski	Belarus	1:17.65	55	1:16.47	48	2:34.12	+27.81
50	69	Vakaris Jokūbas Lapienis	Lithuania	1:16.31	53	1:17.97	49	2:34.28	+27.97
51	71	Mackenson Florindo	Haiti	1:19.94	56	1:22.15	52	2:42.09	+35.78
52	67	Ray Iskandar	Lebanon	1:22.09	58	1:21.93	51	2:44.02	+37.71
53	73	Natthawut Hiranrat	Thailand	1:21.23	57	1:27.82	53	2:49.05	+42.74
	18	Mackenzie Wood	Canada	1:06.28	24	Did not finish			
	21	Bautista Alarcón	Argentina	1:09.49	37	Did not finish			
	23	Martin Križaj	Slovenia	1:04.00	3	Did not finish			
	30	Matthew Ryan	Ireland	1:06.80	28	Did not finish			
	49	Harrison Messenger	New Zealand	1:07.08	31	Did not finish			
	74	Thabo Rateleki	South Africa	1:30.63	59	Disqualified			
	3	Valentin Lotter	Austria	Did not finish					
	7	Mikkel Remsøy	Norway	Did not finish					
	9	Gian Maria Illariuzzi	Italy	Did not finish					
	10	Daniel Gillis	United States	Did not finish					
	11	Rok Ažnoh	Slovenia	Did not finish					
	12	Auguste Aulnette	France	Did not finish					
	19	Oskar Gillberg	Sweden	Did not finish					
	31	Louis Latulippe	Canada	Did not finish					
	35	Simen Sellæg	Norway	Did not finish					
	36	Jack Cunningham	Great Britain	Did not finish					
	38	Ohra Kimishima	Japan	Did not finish					
	39	Max Geissler-Hauber	Germany	Did not finish					
	41	Roman Zverian	Russia	Did not finish					
	48	Maxx Parys	United States	Did not finish					
	75	Nodar Kozanashvili	Georgia	Did not finish					
	8	Silvano Gini	Switzerland	Disqualified					
	25	Thomas Hoffman	Australia	Disqualified					
	66	Drin Kokaj	Kosovo	Disqualified					
