= Haiti at the 2020 Winter Youth Olympics =

- IOC code: HAI
- NOC: Haitian Olympic Committee

in Lausanne, Switzerland January 10–22
- Competitors: 1 in 1 sport
- Flag bearer: Mackenson Florindo
- Medals: Gold 0 Silver 0 Bronze 0 Total 0

Winter Youth Olympics appearances
- 2020; 2024

Haiti competed at the 2020 Winter Youth Olympics in Lausanne, Switzerland from 9 to 22 January 2020.

Haiti made its Winter Youth Olympics debut, as its team consisted of one male alpine skier.

== Alpine skiing ==
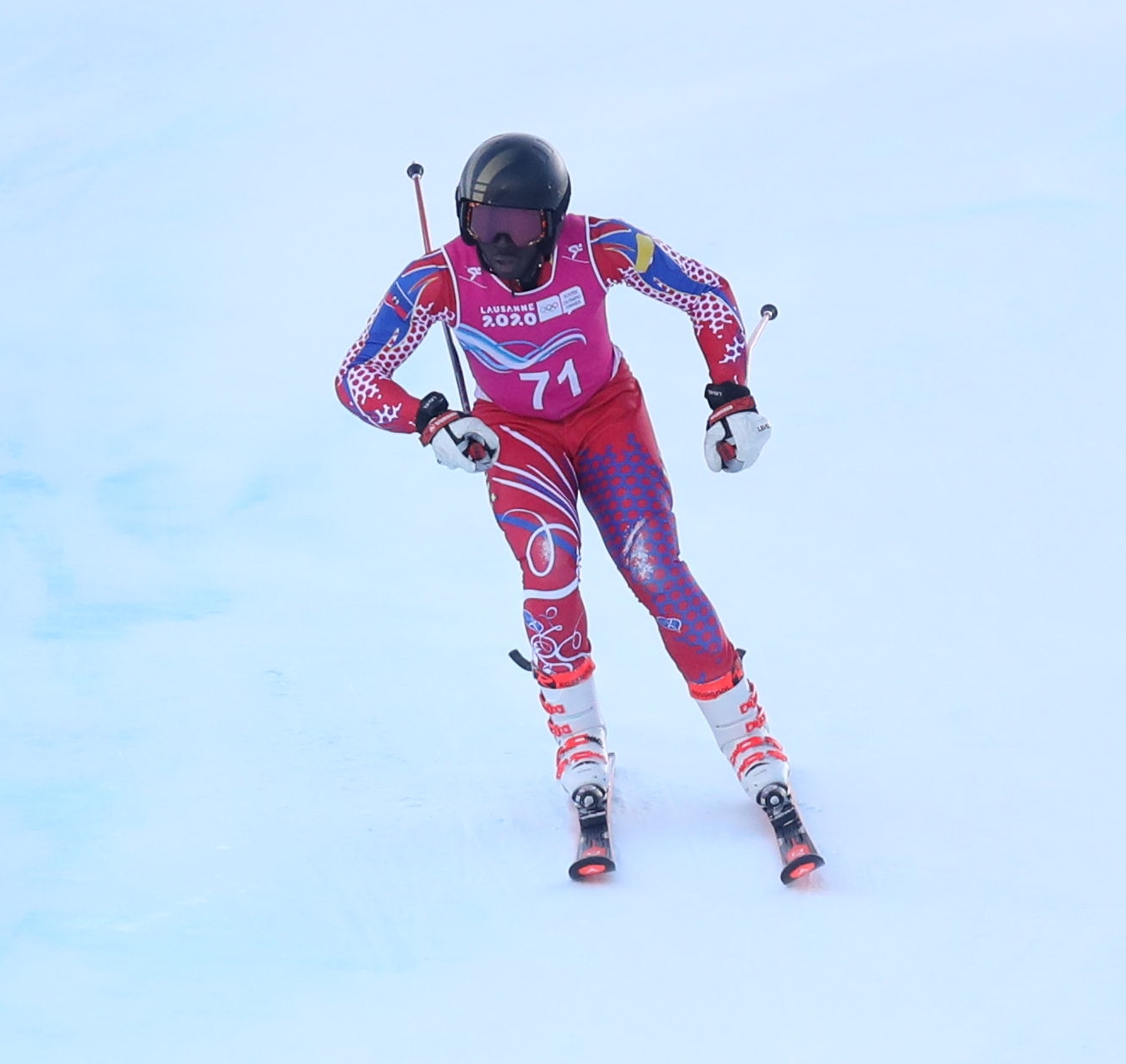
Mackenson Florindo

Boys

Athlete	Event	Run 1		Run 2		Total	
Athlete	Event	Time	Rank	Time	Rank	Time	Rank
Mackenson Florindo	Super-G	—N/a				DNS	
Mackenson Florindo	Combined	DNS					
Mackenson Florindo	Giant slalom	1:19.94	56	1:22.15	52	2:42.09	51
Mackenson Florindo	Slalom	DNF					

== See also ==
- Haiti at the 2020 Summer Olympics
