= Portugal at the 2020 Winter Youth Olympics =

- IOC code: POR
- NOC: Olympic Committee of Portugal
- Website: www.comiteolimpicoportugal.pt

in Lausanne
- Competitors: 2 in 1 sport
- Flag bearer: Manuel Ramos
- Medals: Gold 0 Silver 0 Bronze 0 Total 0

Winter Youth Olympics appearances
- 2012; 2016; 2020; 2024

Portugal competed at the 2020 Winter Youth Olympics in Lausanne, Switzerland from 9 to 22 January 2020.

== Alpine skiing ==
Boys

Athlete	Event	Run 1		Run 2		Total	
Athlete	Event	Time	Rank	Time	Rank	Time	Rank
Manuel Ramos	Giant slalom	1:16.59	54	1:15.48	47	2:32.07	47
Manuel Ramos	Slalom	51.25	49	52.53	36	1:43.78	36

Girls

Athlete	Event	Run 1		Run 2		Total	
Athlete	Event	Time	Rank	Time	Rank	Time	Rank
Vanina Guerillot	Super-G	—				59.10	28
Vanina Guerillot	Combined	59.10	28	DNF			
Vanina Guerillot	Giant slalom	DNF					
Vanina Guerillot	Slalom	48.91	25	DNF			

== See also ==
- Portugal at the 2020 Summer Olympics
