= Lebanon at the 2020 Winter Youth Olympics =

- IOC code: LBN
- NOC: Lebanese Olympic Committee
- Website: www.lebolymp.org

in Lausanne
- Competitors: 3 in 2 sports
- Medals: Gold 0 Silver 0 Bronze 0 Total 0

Winter Youth Olympics appearances
- 2012; 2016; 2020; 2024

Lebanon competed at the 2020 Winter Youth Olympics in Lausanne, Switzerland from 9 to 22 January 2020.

== Alpine skiing ==
Athlete	Event	Run 1		Run 2		Total	
Athlete	Event	Time	Rank	Time	Rank	Time	Rank
Ray Iskandar	Boys' giant slalom	1:22.09	58	1:21.93	51	2:44.02	52
Ray Iskandar	Boys' slalom	53.40	50	55.29	37	1:48.69	38
Maria Issa	Girls' giant slalom	1:38.65	58	DNF			
Maria Issa	Girls' slalom	1:15.13	46	DNF			

== Cross-country skiing ==
Boys

Athlete	Event	Qualification		Quarterfinal		Semifinal		Final	
Athlete	Event	Time	Rank	Time	Rank	Time	Rank	Time	Rank
Elie Tawk	10 km classic	—						DNF	
Elie Tawk	Free sprint	4:39.81	84	did not advance					
Elie Tawk	Cross-country cross	6:13.31	83	did not advance					

== See also ==
- Lebanon at the 2020 Summer Olympics
