= Ecuador at the 2020 Winter Youth Olympics =

- IOC code: ECU
- NOC: Ecuadorian National Olympic Committee
- Website: www.coe.org.ec

in Lausanne, Switzerland January 10–22
- Competitors: 1 in 1 sport
- Flag bearer: Sarah Escobar
- Medals: Gold 0 Silver 0 Bronze 0 Total 0

Winter Youth Olympics appearances
- 2020; 2024

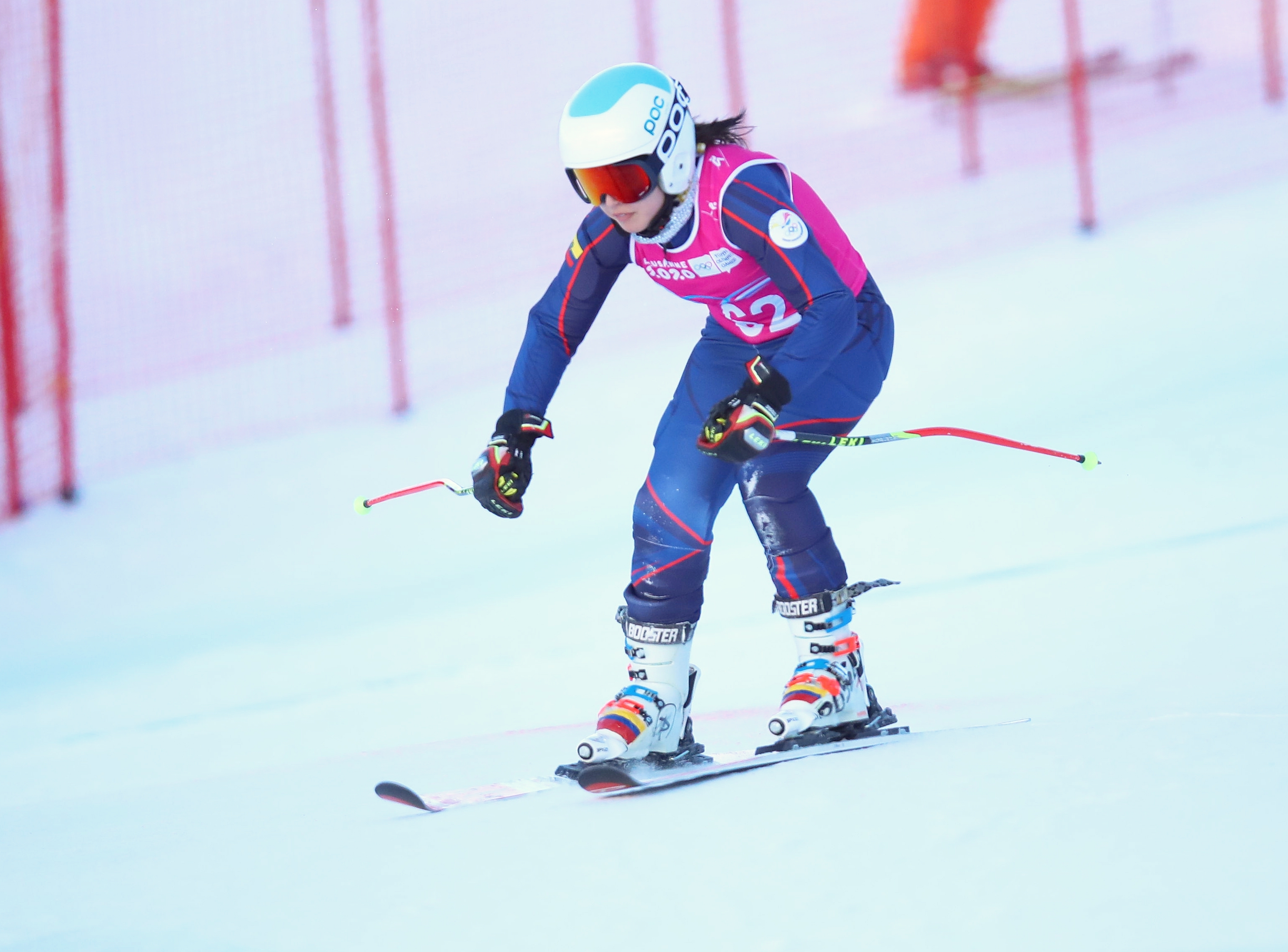
Sarah Escobar

Ecuador competed at the 2020 Winter Youth Olympics in Lausanne, Switzerland from 9 to 22 January 2020. They competed with one athlete in one sport.

Ecuador made it Winter Youth Olympics debut.

== Alpine skiing ==
Girls

Athlete	Event	Run 1		Run 2		Total	
Athlete	Event	Time	Rank	Time	Rank	Time	Rank
Sarah Escobar	Super-G	—N/a				DNS	
Sarah Escobar	Combined	DNS					
Sarah Escobar	Giant slalom	1:21.77	49	DNF			
Sarah Escobar	Slalom	DNF					

== See also ==
- Ecuador at the 2020 Summer Olympics
