= Albania at the 2020 Winter Youth Olympics =

- IOC code: ALB
- NOC: Albanian National Olympic Committee
- Website: nocalbania.org.al

in Lausanne
- Competitors: 1 in 1 sport
- Flag bearer: Ezio Leonetti
- Medals: Gold 0 Silver 0 Bronze 0 Total 0

Winter Youth Olympics appearances (overview)
- 2020; 2024

Albania competed at the 2020 Winter Youth Olympics in Lausanne, Switzerland from 9 to 22 January 2020.

Albania made it Winter Youth Olympics debut.

== Alpine skiing ==
Boys

| Athlete | Event | Run 1 | | Run 2 | | Total | |
| Athlete | Event | Time | Rank | Time | Rank | Time | Rank |
|---|---|---|---|---|---|---|---|
| Ezio Leonetti | Super-G | —N/a | | | | 1:00.19 | 48 |
| Ezio Leonetti | Combined | 1:00.19 | 48 | 40.55 | 35 | 1:40.74 | 35 |
| Ezio Leonetti | Giant slalom | 1:13.85 | 48 | 1:12.01 | 41 | 2:25.86 | 42 |
| Ezio Leonetti | Slalom | 44.23 | 43 | DNF | | | |

== See also ==
- Albania at the 2020 Summer Olympics
