= Trinidad and Tobago at the 2020 Winter Youth Olympics =

- IOC code: TTO
- NOC: Trinidad and Tobago Olympic Committee

in Lausanne, Switzerland January 10–22
- Competitors: 1 in 1 sport
- Medals: Gold 0 Silver 0 Bronze 0 Total 0

Winter Youth Olympics appearances
- 2020; 2024

Trinidad and Tobago competed at the 2020 Winter Youth Olympics in Lausanne, Switzerland from 9 to 22 January 2020. The country entered the competition with one female alpine skier.

This marked Trinidad and Tobago's Winter Youth Olympics debut.

== Alpine skiing ==
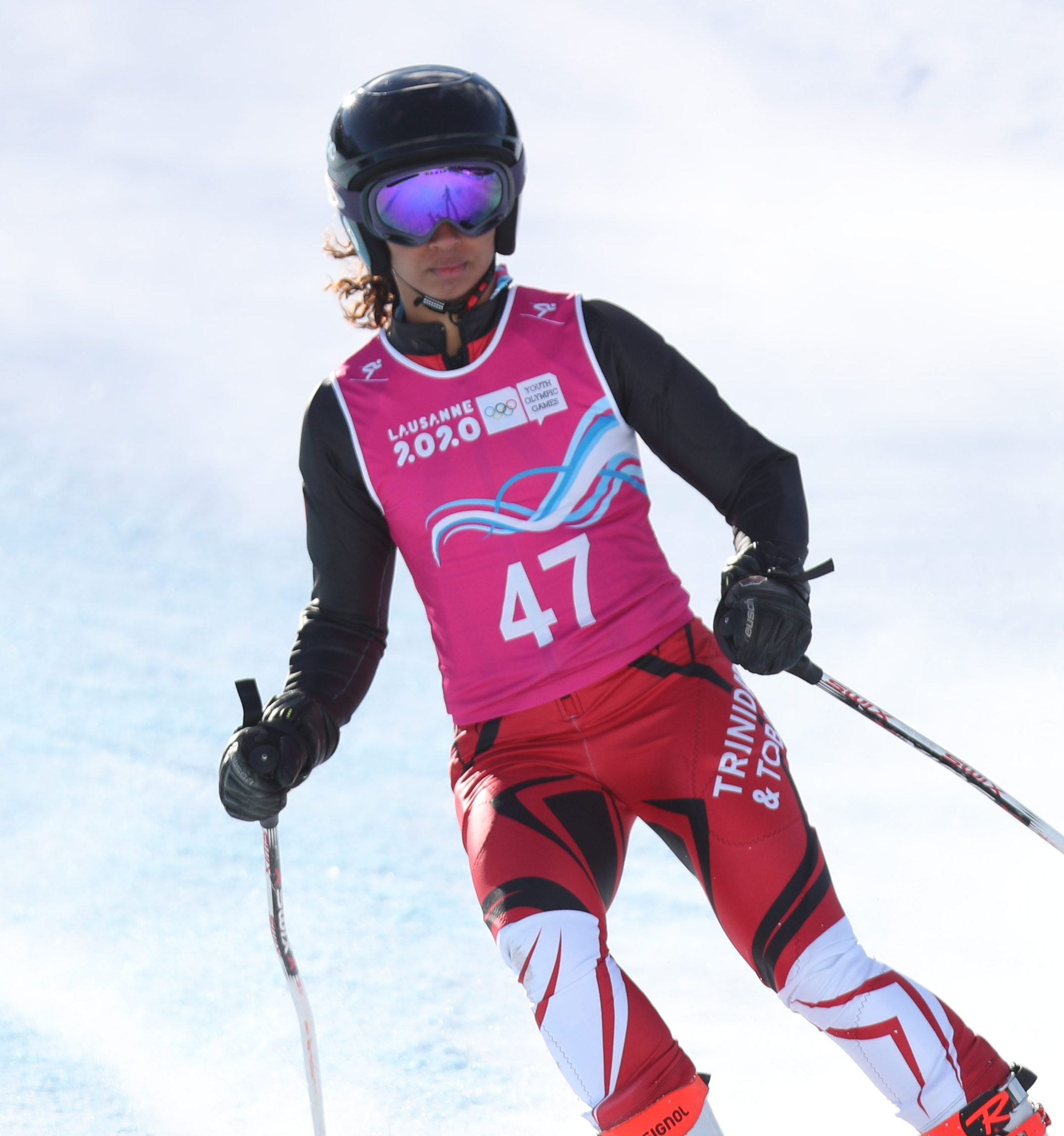
Abigail Vieira during the super-G competition

Trinidad and Tobago qualified one female skier. Viera was born in the United States, but chose to compete for her parents' birth country.

Viera's older sister served as the coach, while her dad served as the team's chef de mission.

Girl

Athlete	Event	Run 1		Run 2		Total	
Athlete	Event	Time	Rank	Time	Rank	Time	Rank
Abigail Vieira	Super-G	—N/a				1:02.58	42
Abigail Vieira	Combined	1:02.58	42	44.97	32	1:47.55	32
Abigail Vieira	Giant slalom	1:15.03	45	DNF			
Abigail Vieira	Slalom	53.73	36	51.88	29	1:45.61	29

== See also ==
- Trinidad and Tobago at the 2020 Summer Olympics
