= Amélie Klopfenstein =

Swiss Olympic alpine skier (born 2002)

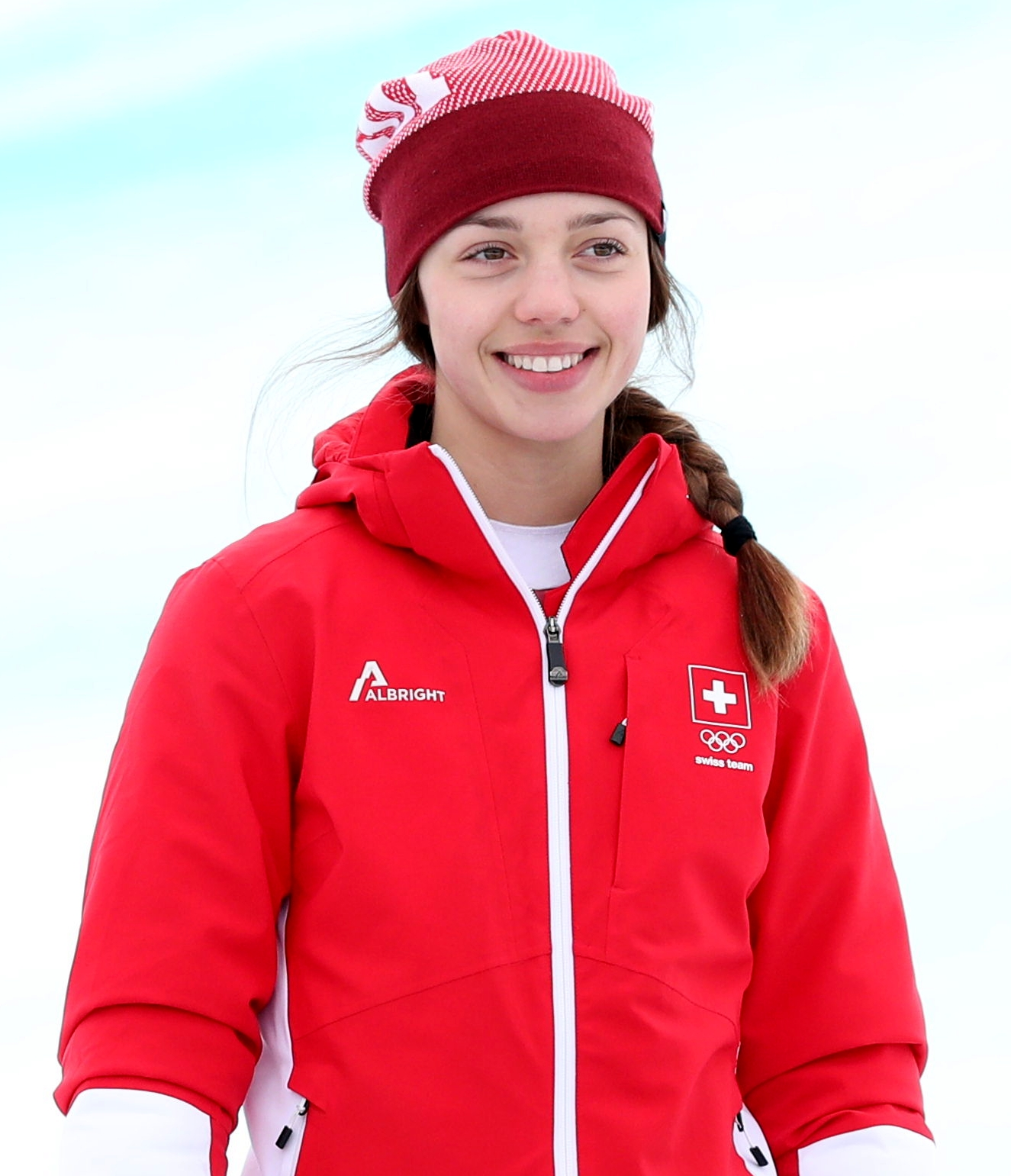
- Klopfenstein in 2020

Personal information
- Born: 18 September 2002 (age 23)

Sport
- Country: Switzerland
- Sport: Alpine skiing
Medal record
Representing Switzerland
Women's alpine skiing
World University Games
Silver medal – second place	2025 Turin	Slalom
Youth Olympic Games
Gold medal – first place	2020 Lausanne	Girls' super-G
Gold medal – first place	2020 Lausanne	Girls' giant slalom
Bronze medal – third place	2020 Lausanne	Girls' combined

Amélie Klopfenstein (born 18 September 2002) is a Swiss olympic alpine skier. She competed at the 2020 Winter Youth Olympics, winning the gold medal in the girls' super-G event. She also competed in the girls' giant slalom event, winning the gold medal. She competed in the girls' combined event, winning the bronze medal.

== Biography ==
Amélie Klopfenstein grew up with three siblings in La Neuveville (German Neuenstadt). She skied her first ski race at the age of four. From the age of 10 she was enrolled in the Regional Performance Center Giron Jurassien and completed her compulsory education there. She then joined the National Performance Center West before transferring to the Spiritus Sanctus sports high school in Brig.
