= Philippines at the 2020 Winter Youth Olympics =

- Flag of the Philippines
- IOC code: PHI
- NOC: Philippine Olympic Committee
- Website: www.olympic.ph

in Lausanne
- Competitors: 2 in 2 sports
- Flag bearer: Ana Noelle Wahleithner
- Medals: Gold 0 Silver 0 Bronze 0 Total 0

Winter Youth Olympics appearances (overview)
- 2012; 2016; 2020; 2024

The Philippines competed at the 2020 Winter Youth Olympics in Lausanne, Switzerland, returning to the Games after missing the previous edition.

The Philippine team consist of two competitors, its first female Winter Youth Olympian in Ana Noelle Wahleithner and its first speed skater Julian Macaraeg. Bones Floro is the chef de mission of the Philippine delegation.

== Alpine skiing ==
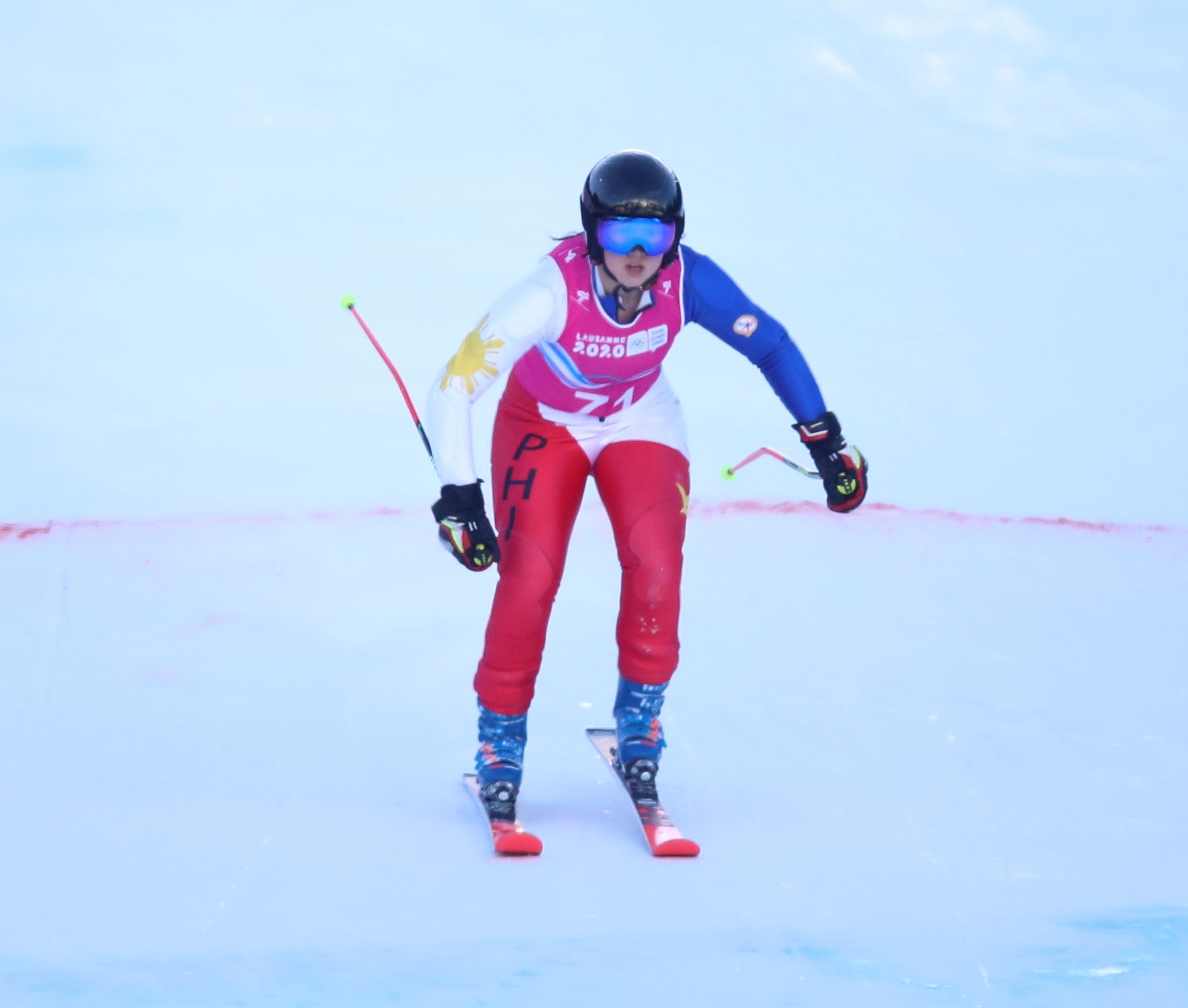
Ana Wahleithner

Philippines has qualified 1 athlete. Ana Noelle Wahleithner is the first ever female athlete to qualify and represent the Philippines in the Winter Youth Olympics.

Girls

Athlete	Event	Run 1		Run 2		Total	
Athlete	Event	Time	Rank	Time	Rank	Time	Rank
Ana Noelle Wahleithner	Giant slalom	1:34.46	56	1:29.77	36	3:04.23	36
Ana Noelle Wahleithner	Slalom	1:02.20	40	1:01.67	33	2:03.87	33

== Short track speed skating ==
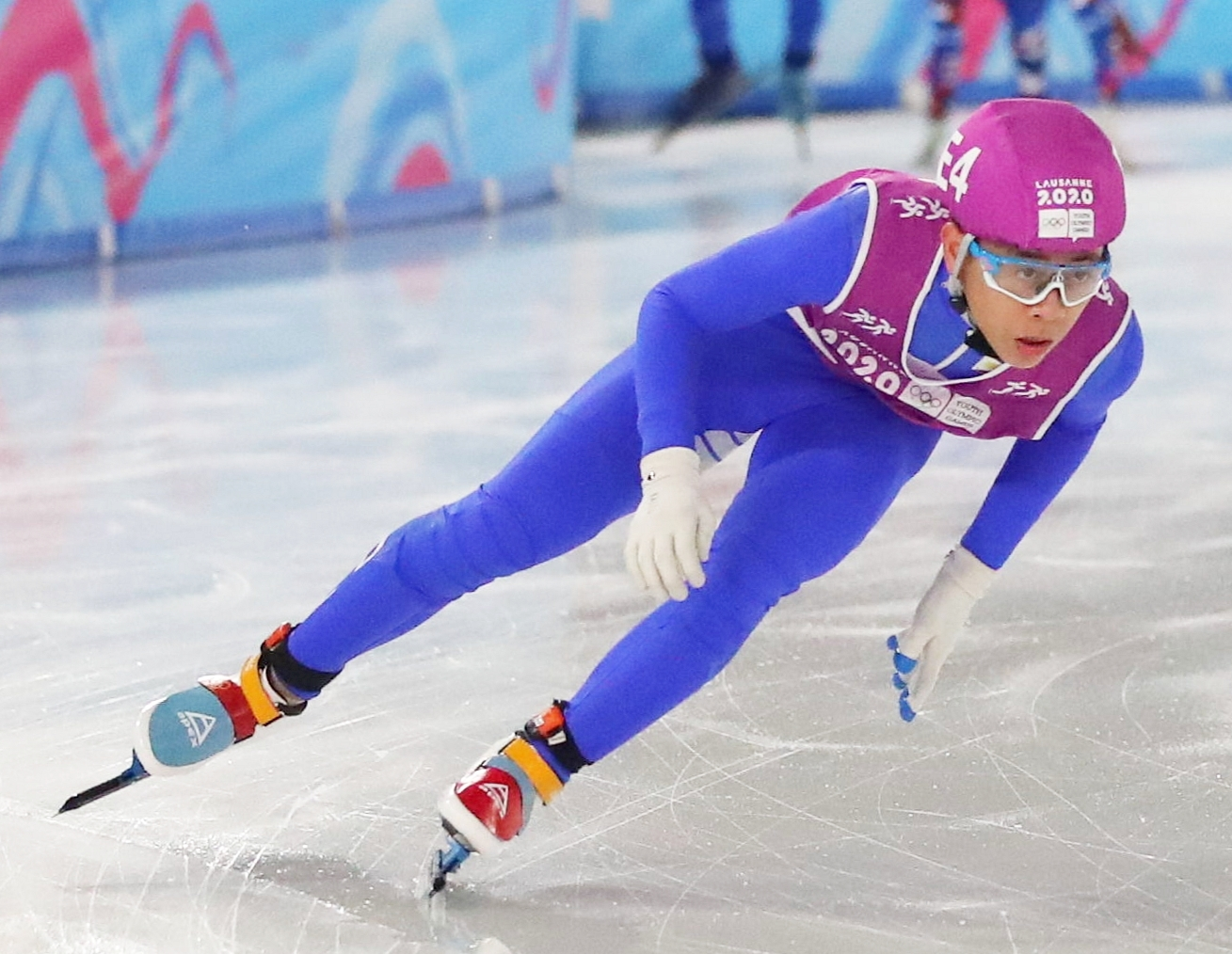
Macaraeg competing in the mixed NOC team relay event.

Philippines has qualified 1 athlete. New York-based Julian Macaraeg is the first short track speed skater to compete for the Philippines. His coach is Serhiy Lifyrenko. Macaraeg competed in the men's 500 m and 1000 m events. In the former he reach the quarterfinals after finishing first in the heats clocking 43.235 seconds. With a record of 42.046 seconds, he finished fourth in the men's 500 m quarterfinals failing to advance to the semifinals. In the men's 1000 m he failed to advance to the quarterfinals. Macaraeg also competed as part of a Mixed-NOC team in the Mixed NOC team relay event along with three other skaters from other countries. They settled for the Finals B after finishing fourth in the first semifinal. They failed to record a time after they were penalized in the Finals B.

Boys

Athlete	Event	Heats		Quarterfinal		Semifinal		Final	
Athlete	Event	Time	Rank	Time	Rank	Time	Rank	Time	Rank
Julian Macaraeg	500 m	43.235	1 Q	42.046	3	did not advance			
Julian Macaraeg	1000 m	1:38.100	4	did not advance					

Team

Athlete	Event	Semifinal		Final	
Athlete	Event	Time	Rank	Time	Rank
Team E Haruna Nagamori (JPN); Petra Rusnáková (SVK); Li Kongchao (CHN); Julian Macaraeg (PHI)	Mixed NOC team relay	4:22.054 QB	4	PEN	N/A

== See also ==
- Philippines at the 2020 Summer Olympics
