= Uzbekistan at the 2020 Winter Youth Olympics =

- IOC code: UZB
- NOC: National Olympic Committee of the Republic of Uzbekistan
- Website: www.olympic.uz

in Lausanne
- Competitors: 1 in 1 sport
- Flag bearer: Valeriya Kovaleva
- Medals: Gold 0 Silver 0 Bronze 0 Total 0

Winter Youth Olympics appearances (overview)
- 2012; 2016; 2020; 2024

Uzbekistan competed at the 2020 Winter Youth Olympics in Lausanne, Switzerland from 9 to 22 January 2020.

== Alpine skiing ==
Girls

Athlete	Event	Run 1		Run 2		Total	
Athlete	Event	Time	Rank	Time	Rank	Time	Rank
Valeriya Kovaleva	Giant slalom	DNF					
Valeriya Kovaleva	Slalom	1:07.65	43	DNF			

== See also ==
- Uzbekistan at the 2020 Summer Olympics
