= Ireland at the 2020 Winter Youth Olympics =

- IOC code: IRL
- NOC: Olympic Council of Ireland
- Website: www.olympicsport.ie

in Lausanne
- Competitors: 2 in 1 sport
- Medals: Gold 0 Silver 0 Bronze 0 Total 0

Winter Youth Olympics appearances
- 2012; 2016; 2020; 2024

Ireland competed at the 2020 Winter Youth Olympics in Lausanne, Switzerland from 9 to 22 January 2020.

== Alpine skiing ==
Boys

Athlete	Event	Run 1		Run 2		Total	
Athlete	Event	Time	Rank	Time	Rank	Time	Rank
Matt Ryan	Super-G	—N/a				58.70	45
Matt Ryan	Combined	58.70	45	35.41	17	1:34.11	25
Matt Ryan	Giant slalom	1:06.80	28	DNF			
Matt Ryan	Slalom	DNF					

Girls

Athlete	Event	Run 1		Run 2		Total	
Athlete	Event	Time	Rank	Time	Rank	Time	Rank
Emma Austin	Giant slalom	DNF					
Emma Austin	Slalom	51.66	35	50.36	27	1:42.02	28

== See also ==
- Ireland at the 2020 Summer Olympics
