= Iceland at the 2020 Winter Youth Olympics =

- IOC code: ISL
- NOC: National Olympic and Sports Association of Iceland
- Website: www.olympic.is

in Lausanne
- Competitors: 4 in 2 sports
- Medals: Gold 0 Silver 0 Bronze 0 Total 0

Winter Youth Olympics appearances
- 2012; 2016; 2020; 2024

Iceland competed at the 2020 Winter Youth Olympics in Lausanne, Switzerland, from 9 to 22 January 2020.

== Alpine skiing ==
Boys

Athlete	Event	Run 1		Run 2		Total	
Athlete	Event	Time	Rank	Time	Rank	Time	Rank
Gauti Gudmundsson	Super-G	—				1:01.32	51
Gauti Gudmundsson	Combined	1:01.32	51	36.85	29	1:38.17	31
Gauti Gudmundsson	Giant slalom	1:09.13	36	1:08.97	27	2:18.10	29
Gauti Gudmundsson	Slalom	41.50	33	DNF			

Girls

Athlete	Event	Run 1		Run 2		Total	
Athlete	Event	Time	Rank	Time	Rank	Time	Rank
Adalbjorg Lilly Hauksdottir	Super-G	—				1:00.51	34
Adalbjorg Lilly Hauksdottir	Combined	1:00.51	34	DNF			
Adalbjorg Lilly Hauksdottir	Giant slalom	DNF					
Adalbjorg Lilly Hauksdottir	Slalom	DNF					

== Cross-country skiing ==
Boys

Athlete	Event	Qualification		Quarterfinal		Semifinal		Final	
Athlete	Event	Time	Rank	Time	Rank	Time	Rank	Time	Rank
Einer Arni Gislason	10 km classic	—						36:15.4	73
Einer Arni Gislason	Free sprint	4:22.86	79	Did not advance					
Einer Arni Gislason	Cross-country cross	5:43.76	78	—		Did not advance			

Girls

Athlete	Event	Qualification		Quarterfinal		Semifinal		Final	
Athlete	Event	Time	Rank	Time	Rank	Time	Rank	Time	Rank
Linda Ros Hannesdottir	5 km classic	—						20:13.6	68

== See also ==
- Iceland at the 2020 Summer Olympics
