= Pakistan at the 2020 Winter Youth Olympics =

- IOC code: PAK
- NOC: Pakistan Olympic Association
- Website: www.nocpakistan.org

in Lausanne
- Competitors: 1 in 1 sport
- Flag bearer: Mia Nuriah Freudweiler
- Medals: Gold 0 Silver 0 Bronze 0 Total 0

Winter Youth Olympics appearances
- 2020; 2024

Pakistan competed at the 2020 Winter Youth Olympics in Lausanne, Switzerland from 9 to 22 January 2020.

Pakistan made it Winter Youth Olympics debut. Mia Nuriah Freudweiler became the first Pakistani to compete at a Winter Youth Olympics.

== Alpine skiing ==
Girls

| Athlete | Event | Run 1 | | Run 2 | | Total | |
| Athlete | Event | Time | Rank | Time | Rank | Time | Rank |
|---|---|---|---|---|---|---|---|
| Mia Nuriah Freudweiler | Super-G | —N/a | | | | 1:04.98 | 46 |
| Mia Nuriah Freudweiler | Combined | 1:04.98 | 46 | 41.77 | 29 | 1:46.75 | 30 |
| Mia Nuriah Freudweiler | Giant slalom | DNF | | | | | |
| Mia Nuriah Freudweiler | Slalom | DNF | | | | | |

== See also ==
- Pakistan at the 2020 Summer Olympics
