= Alpine skiing at the 2020 Winter Youth Olympics – Boys' combined =

2020 Winter Youth Olympics

Boys' combined at the III Winter Youth Olympic Games
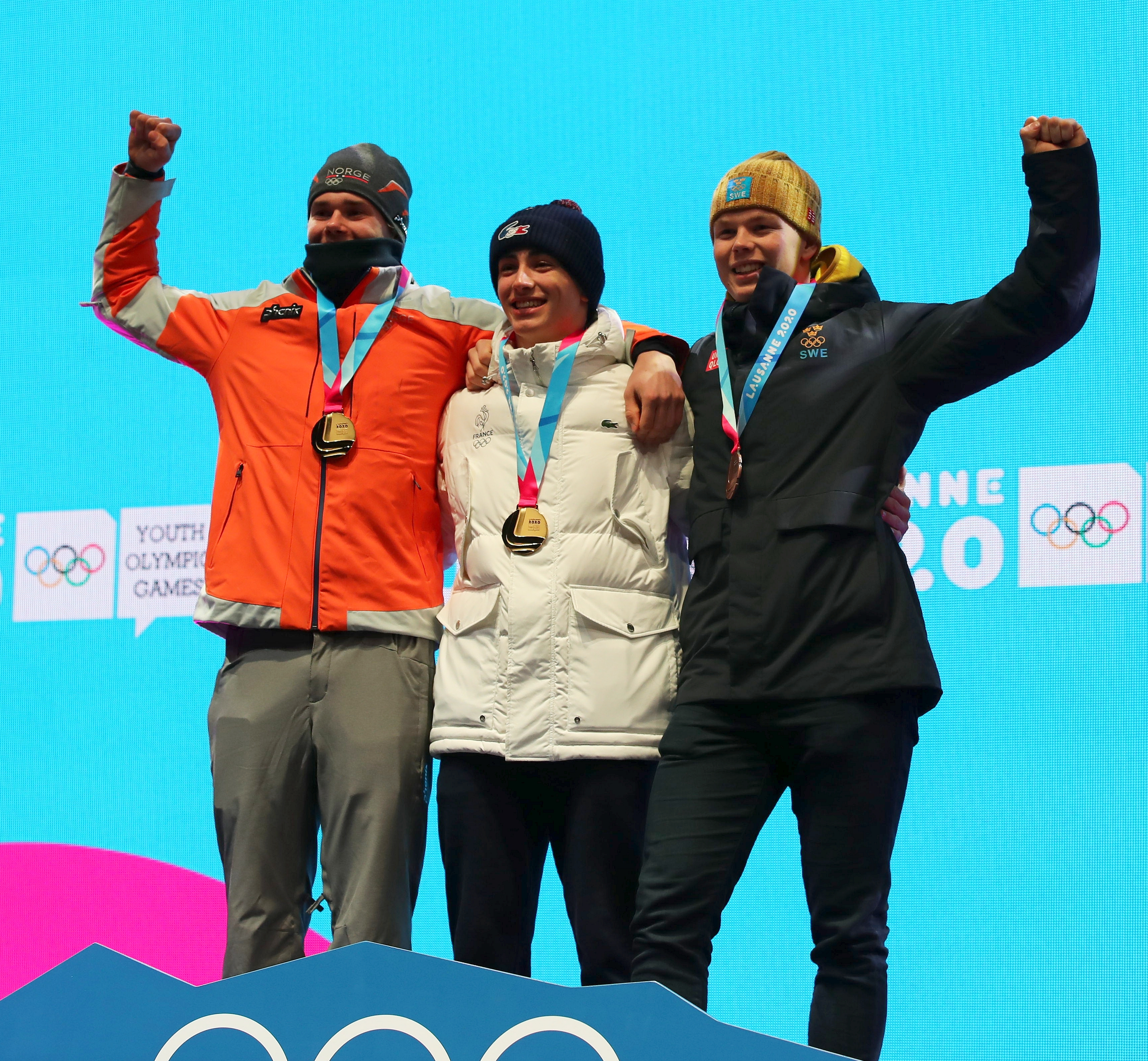
- Venue: Les Diablerets, Switzerland
- Date: 10 January (Super-G); 11 January (slalom)
- Competitors: 61 from 39 nations
- Winning time: 1:28.41

Medalists
1st place, gold medalist(s)		Auguste Aulnette	France
1st place, gold medalist(s)		Mikkel Remsøy	Norway
3rd place, bronze medalist(s)		Adam Hofstedt	Sweden

The boys' combined competition of the 2020 Winter Youth Olympics was held at the Les Diablerets Alpine Centre, Switzerland, on Friday, 10 January (Super-G) and Saturday, 11 January (slalom). The results of the Super-G competition will be counted towards the combined result.

== Results ==
The Super-G was started on 10 January at 13:30. The slalom was started on 11 January at 10:30.

Rank	Bib	Name	Country	Super-G	Rank	Slalom	Rank	Total	Diff.
1st place, gold medalist(s)	37	Auguste Aulnette	France	55.27	9	33.14	1	1:28.41	
1st place, gold medalist(s)	15	Mikkel Remsøy	Norway	55.04	6	33.37	2	1:28.41	
3rd place, bronze medalist(s)	11	Adam Hofstedt	Sweden	54.56	1	34.13	7	1:28.69	+0.28
4	24	Philip Hoffmann	Austria	55.35	10	33.40	3	1:28.75	+0.34
5	17	Luc Roduit	Switzerland	54.76	3	34.40	10	1:29.16	+0.75
6	10	Victor Bessière	France	54.80	4	34.53	11	1:29.33	+0.92
7	2	Baptiste Sambuis	France	55.44	13	34.04	6	1:29.48	+1.07
8	6	Jaakko Tapanainen	Finland	55.98	22	33.89	5	1:29.87	+1.46
9	22	Max Geissler-Hauber	Germany	55.83	18	34.17	8	1:30.00	+1.59
10	5	Silvano Gini	Switzerland	55.49	14	34.81	13	1:30.30	+1.89
11	13	Simen Sellæg	Norway	55.21	8	35.12	15	1:30.33	+1.92
12	31	Edoardo Saracco	Italy	56.86	30	33.67	4	1:30.53	+2.12
13	3	David Kubeš	Czech Republic	55.01	5	35.69	20	1:30.70	+2.29
14	4	Sandro Zurbrügg	Switzerland	55.85	19	35.27	16	1:31.12	+2.71
15	25	Konstantin Stoilov	Bulgaria	56.77	28	35.08	14	1:31.85	+3.44
16	26	Rok Stojanovič	Slovenia	57.03	31	35.41	17	1:32.44	+4.03
17	46	Oskar Gillberg	Sweden	58.22	38	34.30	9	1:32.52	+4.11
18	33	Nicolás Pirozzi	Chile	56.76	27	35.85	21	1:32.61	+4.20
19	9	Daniel Gillis	United States	56.32	25	36.42	26	1:32.74	+4.33
20	44	Tvrtko Ljutić	Croatia	58.45	41	34.72	12	1:33.17	+4.76
21	42	Bartłomiej Sanetra	Poland	57.38	33	35.88	22	1:33.26	+4.85
22	41	Louis Latulippe	Canada	58.24	39	35.50	19	1:33.74	+5.33
23	27	Harrison Messenger	New Zealand	57.59	34	36.25	25	1:33.84	+5.43
24	28	Teo Žampa	Slovakia	55.92	21	38.02	33	1:33.94	+5.53
25	35	Matthew Ryan	Ireland	58.70	45	35.41	17	1:34.11	+5.70
26	57	Ohra Kimishima	Japan	58.52	42	36.02	23	1:34.54	+6.13
27	39	Ty Acosta	Andorra	57.90	37	36.79	28	1:34.69	+6.28
28	54	Louis Masquelier	Belgium	58.58	44	36.42	26	1:35.00	+6.59
29	60	Maxx Parys	United States	59.01	46	36.13	24	1:35.14	+6.73
29	32	Taras Filiak	Ukraine	57.60	35	37.54	32	1:35.14	+6.73
31	61	Gauti Guðmundsson	Iceland	1:01.32	51	36.85	29	1:38.17	+9.76
32	59	Kim Si-won	South Korea	1:01.96	53	37.09	31	1:39.05	+10.64
33	47	Uglješa Pantelić	Serbia	60.97	49	38.75	34	1:39.44	+11.03
34	45	Derin Berkin	Turkey	1:02.61	55	36.87	30	1:39.48	+11.07
35	43	Ezio Leonetti	Albania	60.97	48	40.55	35	1:40.74	+12.33
36	55	Mirko Lazarevski	North Macedonia	1:03.43	56	40.58	36	1:44.01	+15.60
	7	Marco Abbruzzese	Italy	55.52	15	Did not finish			
	8	Rok Ažnoh	Slovenia	54.62	2	Did not finish			
	14	Marinus Sennhofer	Germany	55.40	12	Did not finish			
	16	Gian Maria Illariuzzi	Italy	55.61	16	Did not finish			
	18	Valentin Lotter	Austria	56.13	24	Did not finish			
	19	Roman Zverian	Russia	56.80	29	Did not finish			
	20	Tiziano Gravier	Argentina	55.07	7	Did not finish			
	21	Trent Pennington	United States	55.88	20	Did not finish			
	29	Martin Križaj	Slovenia	55.61	16	Did not finish			
	30	Jack Cunningham	Great Britain	56.36	26	Did not finish			
	34	Bautista Alarcón	Argentina	57.30	32	Did not finish			
	36	Mackenzie Wood	Canada	58.27	40	Did not finish			
	38	Juan Sánchez	Spain	57.62	36	Did not finish			
	40	Thomas Hoffman	Australia	56.05	23	Did not finish			
	48	Andrei Stănescu	Romania	58.52	42	Did not finish			
	49	Joey Steggall	Australia	59.38	47	Did not finish			
	50	Roham Saba	Iran	1:04.45	57	Did not finish			
	51	Christos Marmarellis	Greece	1:01.73	52	Did not finish			
	52	Vladislav Shlemov	Kazakhstan	1:01.15	50	Did not finish			
	53	Tamás Trunk	Hungary	1:02.10	54	Did not finish			
	58	Lukas Ermeskog	Sweden	55.38	11	Did not finish			
	1	Sindre Myklebust	Norway	Did not finish					
	23	Robert Holmes	Great Britain	Did not finish					
	62	Eduard Hallberg	Finland	Did not finish					
	12	Vincent Wieser	Austria	Disqualified					
	56	Mackenson Florindo	Haiti	Did not start					
