= Chile at the 2020 Winter Youth Olympics =

- IOC code: CHI
- NOC: Chilean Olympic Committee
- Website: www.coch.cl

in Lausanne, Switzerland January 10–22
- Competitors: 8 in 4 sports
- Medals: Gold 0 Silver 0 Bronze 0 Total 0

Winter Youth Olympics appearances
- 2012; 2016; 2020; 2024

Chile competed at the 2020 Winter Youth Olympics in Lausanne, Switzerland from 9 to 22 January 2020. They competed with 8 athletes in 4 sports.

== Alpine skiing ==
Boys

Athlete	Event	Run 1		Run 2		Total	
Athlete	Event	Time	Rank	Time	Rank	Time	Rank
Nicolás Pirozzi	Super-G	—N/a				56.76	27
Nicolás Pirozzi	Combined	56.76	27	35.85	21	1:32.61	18
Nicolás Pirozzi	Giant slalom	1:05.17	17	1:05.62	14	2:10.79	14
Nicolás Pirozzi	Slalom	39.84	28	41.13	13	1:20.97	17

Girls

Athlete	Event	Run 1		Run 2		Total	
Athlete	Event	Time	Rank	Time	Rank	Time	Rank
Matilde Schwencke	Super-G	—N/a				58.67	26
Matilde Schwencke	Combined	58.67	26	40.47	22	1:39.14	21
Matilde Schwencke	Giant slalom	DNF					
Matilde Schwencke	Slalom	DNF					

== Cross-country skiing ==
Boys

Athlete	Event	Qualification		Quarterfinal		Semifinal		Final	
Athlete	Event	Time	Rank	Time	Rank	Time	Rank	Time	Rank
Juan Luis Uberuaga	10 km classic	—N/a						40:10.9	76
Juan Luis Uberuaga	Free sprint	4:24.67	80	Did not advance					
Juan Luis Uberuaga	Cross-country cross	5:51.63	80	Did not advance					

Girls

Athlete	Event	Qualification		Quarterfinal		Semifinal		Final	
Athlete	Event	Time	Rank	Time	Rank	Time	Rank	Time	Rank
Natalia Ayala	5 km classic	—N/a						21:27.0	71
Natalia Ayala	Free sprint	3:59.64	80	Did not advance					
Natalia Ayala	Cross-country cross	8:17.89	80	Did not advance					

== Freestyle skiing ==
Ski cross

Athlete	Event	Group heats		Semifinal	Final
Athlete	Event	Points	Rank	Position	Position
Josefina Valdés	Girls' ski cross	11	10	Did not advance	

Slopestyle & Big Air

Athlete	Event	Qualification				Final				
Athlete	Event	Run 1	Run 2	Best	Rank	Run 1	Run 2	Run 3	Best	Rank
Antonia Langer	Girls' big air	DNS								
Antonia Langer	Girls' slopestyle	27.75	17.00	27.75	14	Did not advance				

== Snowboarding ==
Halfpipe, Slopestyle, & Big Air

Athlete	Event	Qualification				Final				
Athlete	Event	Run 1	Run 2	Best	Rank	Run 1	Run 2	Run 3	Best	Rank
Álvaro Yáñez	Boys' big air	20.25	22.75	22.75	18	Did not advance				
Álvaro Yáñez	Boys' slopestyle	28.66	67.33	67.33	7 Q	18.00	31.00	19.00	31.00	9
Benjamin Yanez	Boys' slopestyle	DNS								

== See also ==
- Chile at the 2020 Summer Olympics
