= Anja Oplotnik =

Slovenian alpine skier (born 2002)

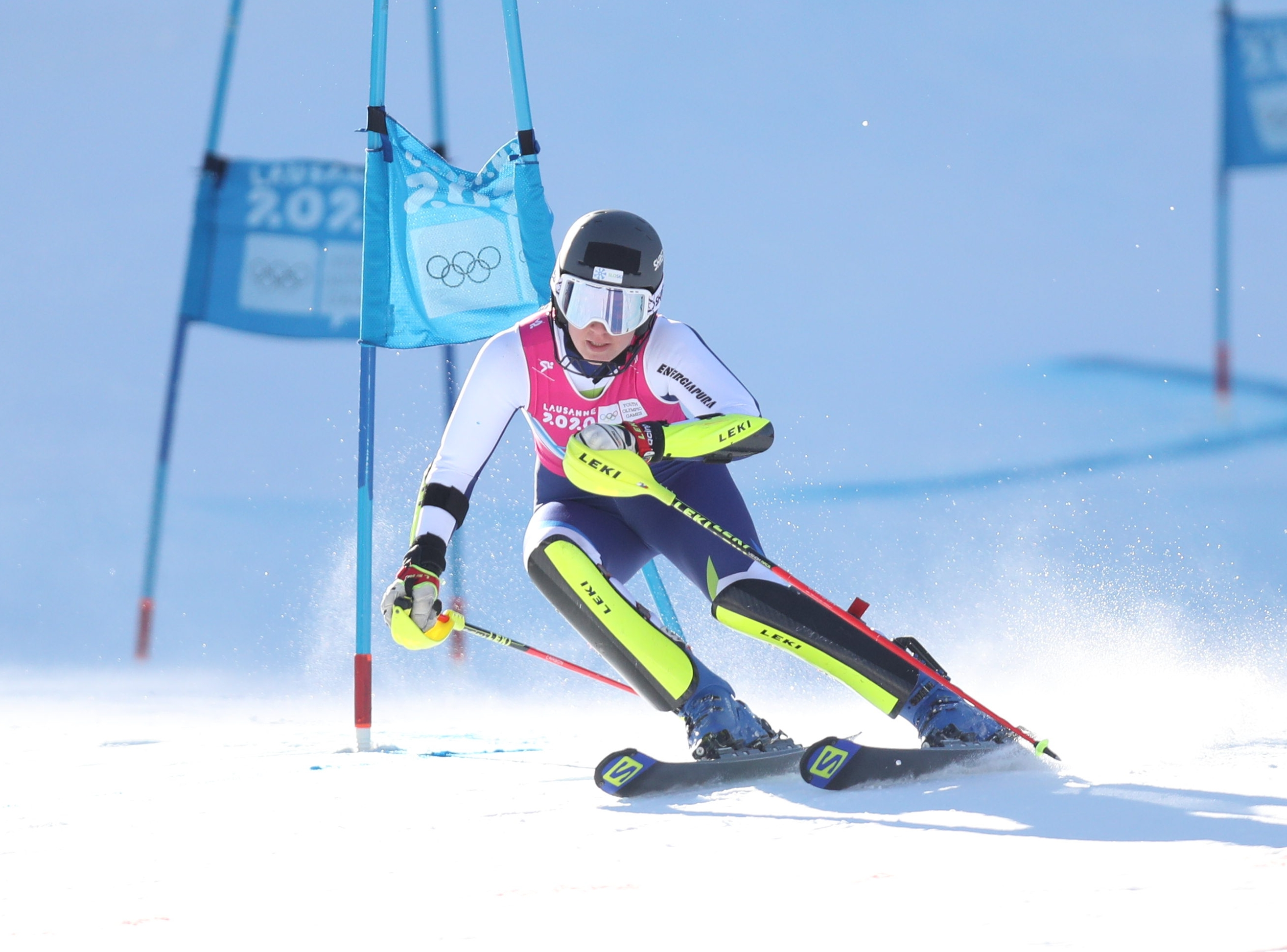

Personal information
- National team: Slovenia

Sport
- Sport: Alpine skiing
- Event(s): Giant slalom, Special slalom
- Coached by: Nejc Rebac

Anja Oplotnik (21 September 2002) is a Slovenian alpine skier.

== Biography ==
Oplotnik began skiing at three years old. She first competed for ŠK Trbovlje until age 14, then she went on to compete for the Celje Ski Club. Oplotnik started competing in FIS races in November 2018.

In 2020, she was selected to compete at the 2020 Youth Olympic Winter Games. At the Games, she competed in Super G, Alpine Combined, and Team Parallel.

Oplotnik made her debut in the FIS Alpine Ski Europa Cup on 27 February 2020 in Krvavec in giant slalom and in the FIS Alpine Ski World Cup on 9 January 2022 in Kranjska Gora in special slalom. In 2022, she started competing for the Slovenian national ski team.

At her first world championship appearance at the 2023 FIS Alpine World Ski Championships in Courchevel/Méribel, she placed 34th in the special slalom.

Oplotnik's role model is Mikaela Shiffrin for her excellence in excelling in all ski disciplines.

At the end of the 2023-2024 ski season, Oplotnik suffered a knee injury which has put her competition career on hold.

== Awards ==
=== European cup ===
- Best overall placing: 163rd in 2022

=== Slovenian Championships ===
- 2 medals:
  - 1 gold (Special Slalom 2020)
  - 1 silver (Special Slalom 2022)
