= 2020 Winter Youth Olympics =

Multi-sport event in Lausanne, Switzerland

III Winter Youth Olympic Games
- Location: Lausanne, Switzerland
- Motto: Start Now
- Nations: 79
- Athletes: 1,788
- Events: 81 in 8 sports (16 disciplines)
- Opening: 9 January
- Closing: 22 January
- Opened by: President Simonetta Sommaruga
- Closed by: IOC president Thomas Bach
- Cauldron: Gina Zehnder
- Stadium: Vaudoise Aréna

The 2020 Winter Youth Olympic Games (German: Olympische Jugend-Winterspiele 2020; French: Jeux olympiques de la jeunesse d'hiver de 2020; Italian: Giochi olimpici giovanili invernali del 2020; Romansh: Gieus olimpics da giuvenils d'enviern 2020), officially known as the III Winter Youth Olympic Games and commonly known as Lausanne 2020 (Italian and Romansh: Losanna 2020), were the third edition of the Winter Youth Olympics; a major international multi-sport event and cultural festival for teenagers that was held in Lausanne, Switzerland, the home of the International Olympic Committee, between 9 and 22 January 2020.

== Bidding process ==
The bidding calendar was announced by the IOC on 6 June 2013, with the application deadline set for 28 November 2013. Lausanne (Switzerland) and Brașov (Romania) were the only two cities that submitted the bids and were selected as the final candidates.

=== Host city selection ===
The IOC voted to select the host city of the 2020 Winter Youth Olympics on 31 July 2015 at the 128th IOC Session at the Kuala Lumpur Convention Centre in Kuala Lumpur, Malaysia. Lausanne was selected by 71 votes to 10, as it got at least 41 votes needed for a majority.

2020 Winter Youth Olympics bidding results
City	Nation	Votes
Lausanne	Switzerland	71
Brașov	Romania	10

== Venues ==
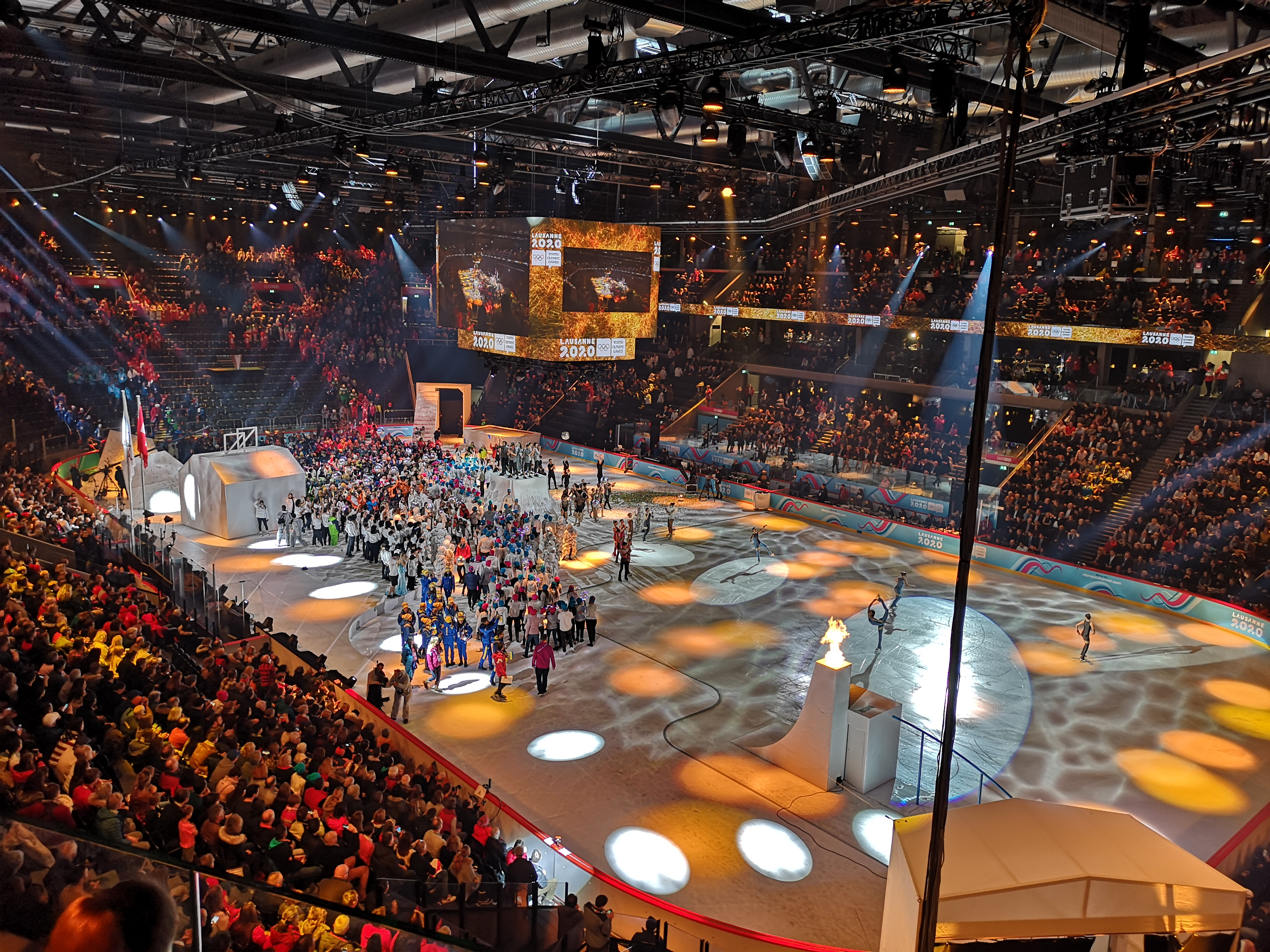
The opening ceremony in the Vaudoise Aréna.

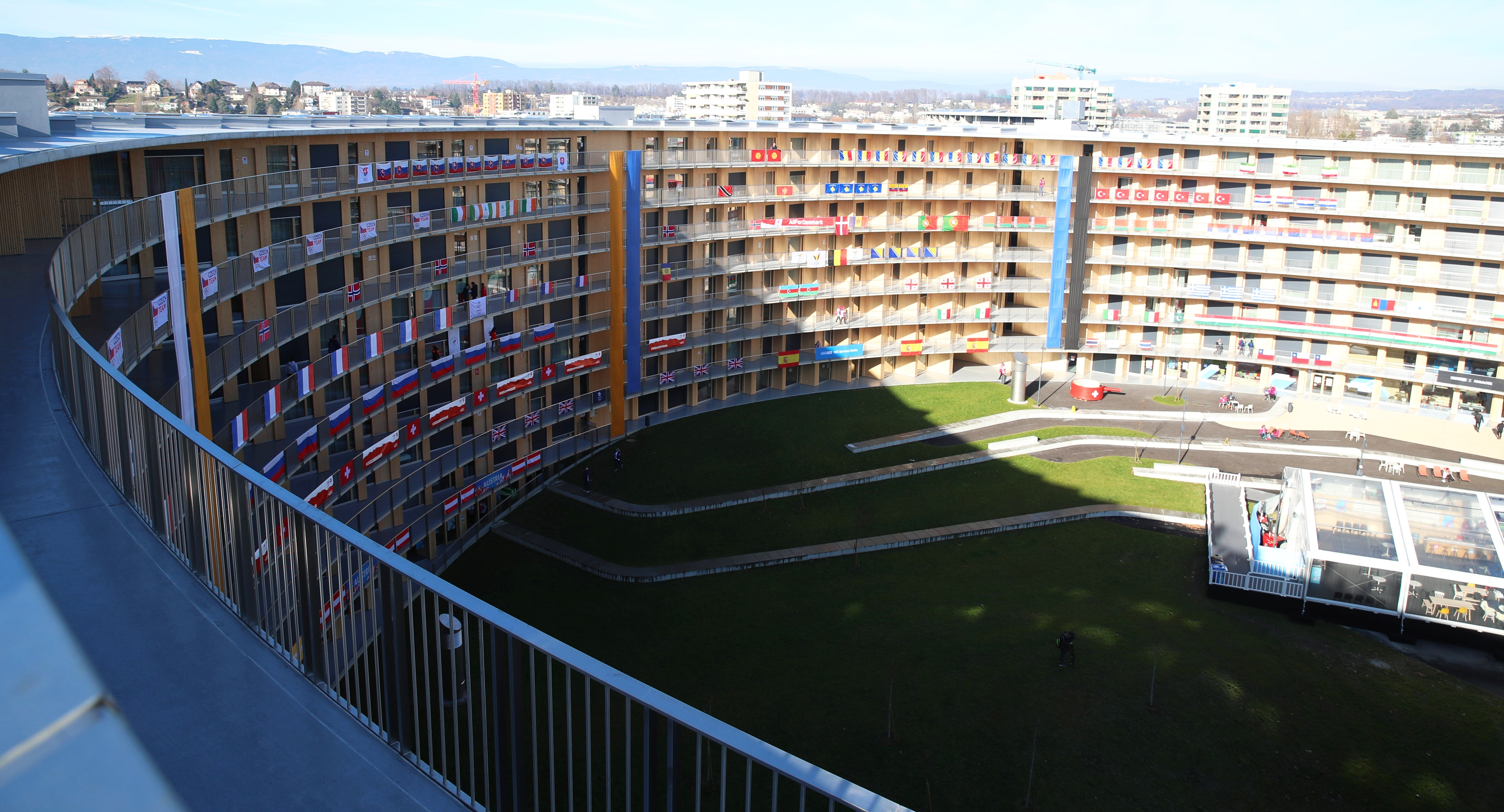
The circular "Vortex" building which houses the Olympic village on the Lausanne campus (it will later become a student residence).

=== Lausanne ===
- Vaudoise Aréna – Opening and closing ceremonies, Ice hockey finals
- CIG de Malley – Figure skating, Short Track
- Lausanne campus – Olympic village
- Le Flon – Medal ceremonies

=== Vallée de Joux ===
- Prémanon, France – Ski jumping, Biathlon, Nordic Combined
- Le Brassus – Cross-country Skiing

=== Alps ===
- Leysin – Ski Freestyle (Halfpipe, Slopestyle), Snowboard (Halfpipe, Slopestyle)
- Les Diablerets – Alpine skiing
- Villars-sur-Ollon – Ski Cross, Snowboard Cross, Ski Mountaineering
- Champéry, Valais – Curling
- St. Moritz, Graubünden – Speed skating, Bobsleigh, Skeleton, Luge, Medal ceremonies

== The Games ==
=== Sports ===
The Youth Olympic Games featured 8 sports and 16 disciplines. 81 events took place which included 13 mixed team events (NOCs), 34 men's events, and 34 women's events. Ski mountaineering and women's Nordic combined was featured for the first time in an Olympic event. A mixed-NOC 3-on-3 ice hockey tournament and a women's doubles event in luge were also contested for the first time.

- Alpine skiing (9)
- Biathlon (6)
- Bobsleigh (2)
- Cross-country skiing (6)
- Curling (2)
- Figure skating (5)
- Freestyle skiing (8)
- Ice hockey (4)
- Luge (5)
- Nordic combined (3)
- Short track speed skating (5)
- Skeleton (2)
- Ski jumping (3)
- Ski mountaineering (5)
- Snowboarding (9)
- Speed skating (7)

=== Participating National Olympic Committees ===
A total of 1,788 athletes from 79 nations qualified, the most for any edition of a Winter Youth Olympics. 12 NOCs made their Winter Youth Olympics debuts: Albania, Azerbaijan, Ecuador, Haiti, Hong Kong, Kosovo, Pakistan, Qatar, Singapore, Thailand, Trinidad and Tobago, and Turkmenistan. Qatar and Turkmenistan have never competed at the Winter Olympics and Haiti competed at the 2022 Winter Olympics.

Participating National Olympic Committees
- Albania (1)
- Andorra (3)
- Argentina (16)
- Armenia (1)
- Australia (33)
- Austria (63)
- Azerbaijan (1)
- Belarus (19)
- Belgium (9)
- Bosnia and Herzegovina (9)
- Brazil (12)
- Bulgaria (18)
- Canada (78)
- Chile (8)
- China (53)
- Colombia (2)
- Croatia (10)
- Cyprus (1)
- Czech Republic (74)
- Denmark (26)
- Ecuador (1)
- Estonia (25)
- Finland (52)
- France (61)
- Georgia (10)
- Germany (90)
- Great Britain (28)
- Greece (12)
- Haiti (1)
- Hong Kong (4)
- Hungary (23)
- Iceland (4)
- Iran (6)
- Ireland (2)
- Israel (3)
- Italy (67)
- Japan (72)
- Kazakhstan (26)
- Kosovo (2)
- Kyrgyzstan (2)
- Latvia (30)
- Lebanon (3)
- Liechtenstein (5)
- Lithuania (15)
- Luxembourg (4)
- Malaysia (2)
- Mexico (7)
- Moldova (5)
- Mongolia (6)
- Montenegro (2)
- Netherlands (15)
- New Zealand (20)
- North Macedonia (5)
- Norway (55)
- Pakistan (1)
- Philippines (2)
- Poland (45)
- Portugal (2)
- Qatar (1)
- Romania (35)
- Russia (104)
- San Marino (1)
- Serbia (6)
- Singapore (3)
- Slovakia (49)
- Slovenia (39)
- South Africa (2)
- South Korea (40)
- Spain (24)
- Sweden (51)
- Switzerland (112) (host nation)
- Chinese Taipei (14)
- Thailand (5)
- Trinidad and Tobago (1)
- Turkey (14)
- Turkmenistan (1)
- Ukraine (39)
- United States (96)
- Uzbekistan (1)

==== Number of athletes by National Olympic Committee ====
IOC Letter Code	Country	Athletes
SUI	Switzerland	112
RUS	Russia	104
USA	United States	96
GER	Germany	90
CAN	Canada	78
CZE	Czech Republic	74
JPN	Japan	72
ITA	Italy	67
AUT	Austria	63
FRA	France	61
NOR	Norway	55
CHN	China	53
FIN	Finland	52
SWE	Sweden	51
SVK	Slovakia	49
POL	Poland	45
KOR	South Korea	40
SLO	Slovenia	39
UKR	Ukraine	39
ROU	Romania	35
AUS	Australia	33
LAT	Latvia	30
GBR	Great Britain	28
DEN	Denmark	26
KAZ	Kazakhstan	26
EST	Estonia	25
ESP	Spain	24
HUN	Hungary	23
NZL	New Zealand	20
BLR	Belarus	19
BUL	Bulgaria	18
ARG	Argentina	16
LTU	Lithuania	15
NED	Netherlands	15
TPE	Chinese Taipei	14
TUR	Turkey	14
BRA	Brazil	12
GRE	Greece	12
CRO	Croatia	10
GEO	Georgia	10
BEL	Belgium	9
BIH	Bosnia and Herzegovina	9
CHI	Chile	8
MEX	Mexico	7
IRI	Iran	6
MGL	Mongolia	6
SRB	Serbia	6
LIE	Liechtenstein	5
MDA	Moldova	5
MKD	North Macedonia	5
THA	Thailand	5
HKG	Hong Kong	4
ISL	Iceland	4
LUX	Luxembourg	4
AND	Andorra	3
ISR	Israel	3
LBN	Lebanon	3
SGP	Singapore	3
MAS	Malaysia	2
COL	Colombia	2
IRL	Ireland	2
KOS	Kosovo	2
KGZ	Kyrgyzstan	2
MNE	Montenegro	2
PHI	Philippines	2
POR	Portugal	2
RSA	South Africa	2
ALB	Albania	1
ARM	Armenia	1
AZE	Azerbaijan	1
CYP	Cyprus	1
ECU	Ecuador	1
HAI	Haiti	1
PAK	Pakistan	1
QAT	Qatar	1
SMR	San Marino	1
TTO	Trinidad and Tobago	1
TKM	Turkmenistan	1
UZB	Uzbekistan	1

=== Calendar ===
All dates are CET (UTC+1)

OC	Opening ceremony	●	Event competitions	1	Event finals	EG	Exhibition Gala	CC	Closing ceremony

January	9 Thu	10 Fri	11 Sat	12 Sun	13 Mon	14 Tue	15 Wed	16 Thu	17 Fri	18 Sat	19 Sun	20 Mon	21 Tue	22 Wed	Events
Ceremonies	OC													CC	
Alpine skiing		2	2	1	1	2	1								9
Biathlon			2	1		2	1								6
Bobsleigh											1	1			2
Cross-country skiing										2	2		2		6
Curling		●	●	●	●	●	●	1		●	●	●	●	1	2
Figure skating		●	●	2	2		1								5
Freestyle skiing										1	2	2	1	2	8
Ice hockey		●	●	●	●	●	2		●	●	●	●	1	1	4
Luge									2	2		1			5
Nordic combined										2				1	3
Short track speed skating										2		2		1	5
Skeleton											1	1			2
Ski jumping											2	1			3
Ski mountaineering		2			2	1									5
Snowboarding										1		4	2	2	9
Speed skating				2	2		1	2							7
Total events		4	4	6	7	5	6	3	2	10	8	12	6	8	81
Cumulative total		4	8	14	21	26	32	35	37	47	55	67	73	81	
January	9 Thu	10 Fri	11 Sat	12 Sun	13 Mon	14 Tue	15 Wed	16 Thu	17 Fri	18 Sat	19 Sun	20 Mon	21 Tue	22 Wed	Events

=== Medal table ===
* Host nation (Switzerland)

Rank	Nation	Gold	Silver	Bronze	Total
1	Russia	10	11	8	29
2	Switzerland*	10	6	8	24
3	Japan	9	7	1	17
–	Mixed-NOCs	6	6	6	18
4	Sweden	6	4	7	17
5	Austria	6	2	5	13
6	Germany	5	7	6	18
7	South Korea	5	3	0	8
8	Norway	4	2	3	9
9	China	3	3	4	10
10	France	2	5	5	12
11–33	Remaining	17	23	28	68
Totals (33 entries)		83	79	81	243

Source: Lausanne 2020

=== Athlete Rolemodels ===
Sports	Male Rolemodels	Female Rolemodels
Alpine skiing	Sandro Viletta (Switzerland)	Verena Stuffer (Italy)
Biathlon	Henrik L'Abée-Lund (Norway)	Marie-Laure Brunet (France)
Bobsleigh	–	Jamie Greubel Poser (United States)
Cross-country skiing	Gianluca Cologna (Switzerland)	Maria Danou (Greece)
Curling	John Morris (Canada)	Marlene Albrecht (Switzerland)
Figure skating	Patrick Chan (Canada)	Sarah Meier-van Berkel (Switzerland; Nathalie Péchalat (France))
Freestyle skiing	–	Hannah Kearney (United States)
Ice hockey	Mark Streit (Switzerland)	Florence Schelling (Switzerland)
Luge	Gregory Carigiet (Switzerland)	Tatjana Hüfner (Germany)
Nordic combined	–	Tara Geraghty-Moats (United States)
Short track speed skating	Viktor Knoch (Hungary)	–
Skeleton	Pascal Oswald (Switzerland)	–
Ski jumping	Jernej Damjan (Slovenia)	–
Ski mountaineering	Yannick Ecoeur (Switzerland)	Ekaterina Osichkina (Russia)
Snowboarding	Alex Deibold (United States)	–
Speed skating	Livio Wenger (Switzerland)	Vanessa Herzog (Austria)

=== Opening ceremony ===
The opening ceremony of the 2020 Winter Youth Olympic Games took place on the evening of Thursday 9 January 2020 at the Vaudoise Aréna, in Lausanne.

=== Closing ceremony ===
The closing ceremony of the 2020 Winter Youth Olympic Games took place on the evening of Thursday 22 January 2020 at the Medals Plaza Lausanne. The ceremony featured the flag handover from mayor of Lausanne Grégoire Junod to IOC President Thomas Bach and to the governor of Gangwon Choi Moon-soon as host of the 2024 Winter Youth Olympics and the extinguishing of the Youth Olympic flame.

== Marketing ==
=== Mascot ===
Yodli
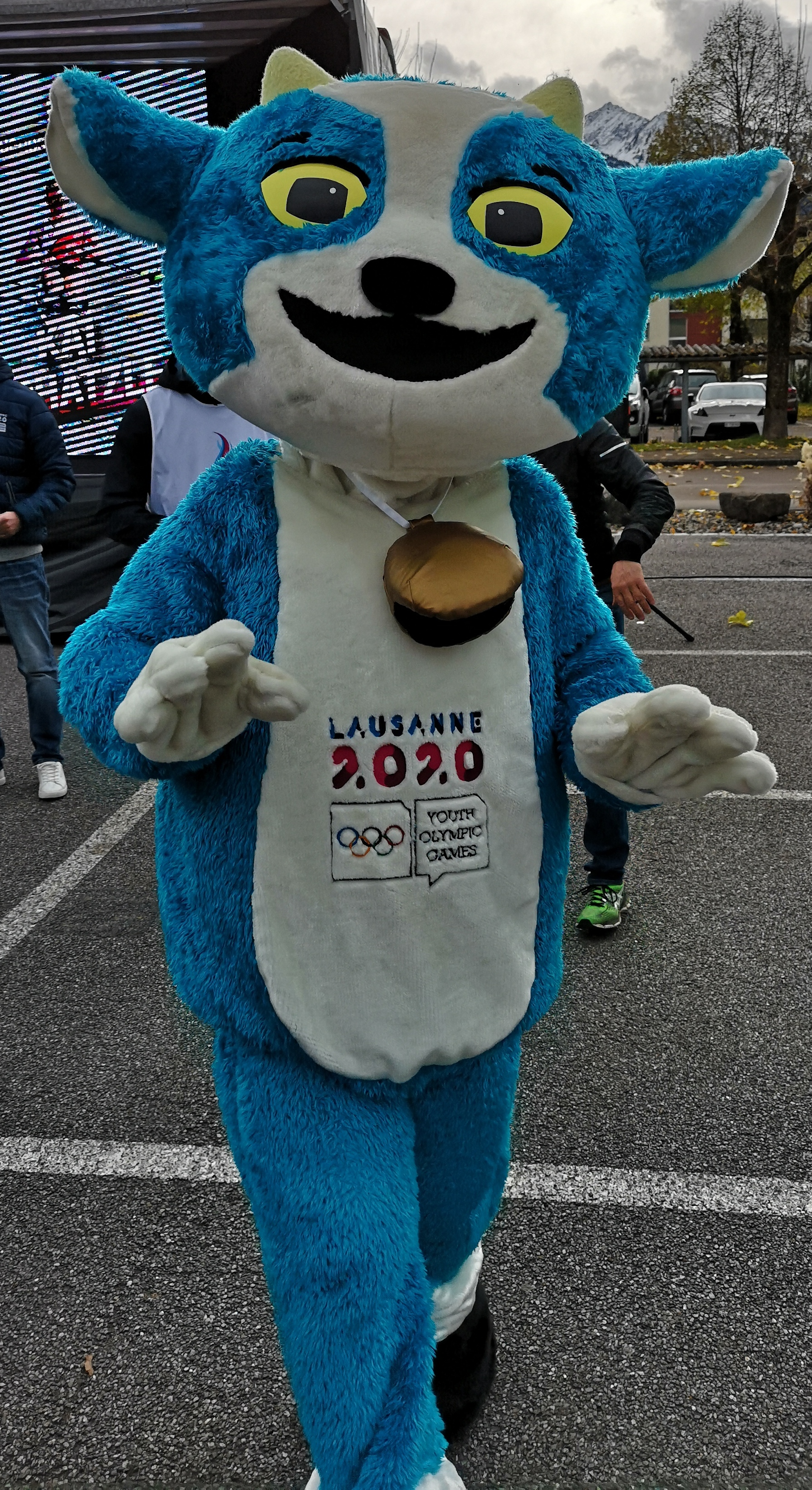

Mascot of the 2020 Winter Youth Olympics (Lausanne)
- Creator: ERACOM
- Significance: A combination of a cow, Saint Bernard dog and goat

Yodli the official mascot was unveiled on 8 January 2019 at CIG de Malley before the match between Lausanne HC and HC Davos. Yodli is inspired by a combination of a cow, a Saint Bernard dog, and a goat, and was created by ERACOM. Blue represents the Swiss lakes.

=== Colours ===
Magenta, Sky Blue

=== Tickets ===
It was announced that all events apart from the opening ceremony would be free to watch in January 2020.

=== Media coverage ===
- Europe - Eurosport
- Singapore - Mediacorp (delay)
- Thailand – Plan B
- Malaysia - Unifi TV
- United States - Olympic Channel
- Mexico - Marca Claro (online), TUDN (Delay)
- United Kingdom - BBC iPlayer (online)

== See also ==
- Lausanne bid for the 2020 Winter Youth Olympics

Preceded by Lillehammer	Winter Youth Olympic Games; Lausanne; 2020	Succeeded by Gangwon Province
