= 2020 Winter Youth Olympics medal table =

The 2020 Winter Youth Olympics medal table is a list of National Olympic Committees (NOCs) ranked by the number of gold medals won by their athletes during the 2020 Winter Youth Olympics, held in Lausanne, Switzerland, from 9 to 22 January 2020.

== Accomplishments ==
Noa Szollos was the first Israeli athlete to win a Winter Olympics medal. On the 10th of January, Noa finished the girls' super-G event in alpine skiing in third place and the next day she finished in second place in combined event. This also happened with Georgia who won its first medal in a Winter Olympics event, a bronze was won in the figure skating pair event by the skaters Alina Butaeva and Luka Berulava. An unprecedented case happened in boys' mass start speed skating when the Colombian skater Diego Amaya won the silver medal. This was the first time in history that an athlete from a tropical nation and a Latin American won a medal at an Olympic winter event.

Kelly Sildaru was the first Estonian athlete to win a gold medal at the Youth Olympic Games, in freestyle skiing slopestyle event. Liechtenstein also won its first bronze medal in the history of the Youth Olympic Games, a bronze medal won by Quentin Sanzo in bobsleigh.

Spaniard Maria Costa Diez also made history as she won the first Winter Olympics gold medal for her country since alpine skiing slalom at the 1972 Winter Olympics won by Francisco Fernández Ochoa. Costa Diez won the sprint event at the ski mountaineering.

== Medal table ==
By default, the table is ordered by the number of gold medals the athletes from a nation have won (in this context, a "nation" is an entity represented by a National Olympic Committee). The number of silver medals is taken into consideration next and then the number of bronze medals. If nations are still tied, equal ranking is given and they are listed alphabetically.

In the Boys' combined event in alpine skiing, two gold medals were awarded for a first place tie. No silver medal was awarded for the event. In the Boys' monobob on bobsleigh, also two gold medals were awarded for a first place tie, and no silver medal was awarded.

* Host nation (Switzerland)

Rank	Nation	Gold	Silver	Bronze	Total
1	Russia	10	11	8	29
2	Switzerland*	10	6	8	24
3	Japan	9	7	1	17
–	Mixed-NOCs	6	6	6	18
4	Sweden	6	4	7	17
5	Austria	6	2	5	13
6	Germany	5	7	6	18
7	South Korea	5	3	0	8
8	Norway	4	2	3	9
9	China	3	3	4	10
10	France	2	5	5	12
11	United States	2	3	6	11
12	Italy	2	3	3	8
13	Netherlands	2	2	1	5
14	Romania	2	0	0	2
15	Canada	1	2	5	8
16	Latvia	1	2	2	5
17	Czech Republic	1	2	1	4
18	Finland	1	2	0	3
19	Spain	1	1	3	5
20	Australia	1	0	0	1
20	Belgium	1	0	0	1
20	Estonia	1	0	0	1
20	Poland	1	0	0	1
24	Slovenia	0	2	0	2
25	Israel	0	1	1	2
25	Slovakia	0	1	1	2
27	Colombia	0	1	0	1
27	Great Britain	0	1	0	1
29	Belarus	0	0	1	1
29	Georgia	0	0	1	1
29	Liechtenstein	0	0	1	1
29	New Zealand	0	0	1	1
29	Ukraine	0	0	1	1
Totals (33 entries)		83	79	81	243

Source: Lausanne 2020
