= Ski jumping at the 2020 Winter Youth Olympics =

Ski jumping at the III Winter Youth Olympic Games
- Venue: Les Tuffes
- Dates: 19–22 January
- Competitors: 71 from 22 nations

Ski jumping at the 2020 Winter Youth Olympics will take place in Les Tuffes, France.

== Medal summary ==
=== Medal table ===
Rank	Nation	Gold	Silver	Bronze	Total
1	Austria	2	0	1	3
2	Russia	1	0	0	1
3	France	0	1	1	2
4	Japan	0	1	0	1
4	Slovenia	0	1	0	1
6	Czech Republic	0	0	1	1
Totals (6 entries)		3	3	3	9

=== Events ===
Event	Gold		Silver		Bronze	
Boys' individual	Marco Wörgötter; Austria	257.7	Mark Hafnar; Slovenia	247.1	David Haagen; Austria	244.5
Girls' individual	Anna Shpyneva; Russia	229.6	Joséphine Pagnier; France	222.8	Štěpánka Ptáčková; Czech Republic	214.6
Mixed team	Austria; Lisa Hirner; Stefan Rettenegger; Julia Mühlbacher; Marco Wörgötter	986.4	Japan; Ayane Miyazaki; Yuto Nishikata; Machiko Kubota; Sota Kudo	938.0	France; Emma Treand; Marco Heinis; Joséphine Pagnier; Valentin Foubert	886.7

== Qualification ==
=== Qualification summary ===
NOC	Boys	Girls	Total
Austria	2	2	4
Canada	2		2
China		1	1
Czech Republic	2	2	4
Estonia	2	1	3
Finland	2	2	4
France	2	1	3
Georgia		1	1
Germany	2	2	4
Great Britain	1		1
Hungary	1		1
Italy	2	2	4
Japan	1	2	3
Kazakhstan	2	2	4
Norway	2	2	4
Poland	2	2	4
Romania	2	2	4
Russia	2	2	4
Slovenia	2	2	4
Switzerland	2	2	4
Ukraine	2	2	4
United States	2	2	4
Total: 22 NOCs	37	34	71
