= France at the 2020 Winter Youth Olympics =

- IOC code: FRA
- NOC: French Olympic Committee
- Website: franceolympique.com

in Lausanne
- Competitors: 61
- Medals Ranked 10th: Gold 2 Silver 5 Bronze 5 Total 12

Winter Youth Olympics appearances
- 2012; 2016; 2020; 2024

France competed at the 2020 Winter Youth Olympics in Lausanne, Switzerland from 9 to 22 January 2020.

== Medalists ==
| Medal | Name | Sport | Event | Date |
|---|---|---|---|---|
| Gold | Auguste Aulnette | Alpine skiing | Boys' combined | 11 January |
| Gold | Jeanne Richard; Mathieu Garcia | Biathlon | Single mixed relay | 12 January |
| Gold | Nathan Nicoud | Ice hockey | Boys' 3x3 mixed tournament | 15 January |
| Gold | Ludmilla Bourcet | Ice hockey | Girls' 3x3 mixed tournament | 15 January |
| Silver | Caitlin McFarlane | Alpine skiing | Girls' super-G | 10 January |
| Silver | Jeanne Richard | Biathlon | Girls' individual | 11 January |
| Silver | Victoire Berger; Bazil Ducouret; Margot Ravinel; Anselme Damevin | Ski mountaineering | Mixed relay | 14 January |
| Silver | Maël Halladj | Ice hockey | Boys' 3x3 mixed tournament | 15 January |
| Silver | Joséphine Pagnier | Ski jumping | Girls' normal hill individual | 19 January |
| Silver | Margaux Herpin | Snowboarding | Girls' snowboard cross | 20 January |
| Bronze | Margot Ravinel | Ski mountaineering | Girls' individual | 10 January |
| Bronze | Mathieu Garcia | Biathlon | Boys' individual | 11 January |
| Bronze | Margot Ravinel | Ski mountaineering | Girls' sprint | 13 January |
| Bronze | Fany Bertrand; Léonie Jeannier; Théo Guiraud-Poillot; Mathieu Garcia | Biathlon | Mixed relay | 15 January |
| Bronze | Hugo Galvez | Ice hockey | Boys' 3x3 mixed tournament | 15 January |
| Bronze | Emma Tréand; Marco Heinis; Joséphine Pagnier; Valentin Foubert | Ski jumping | Mixed team normal hill | 20 January |

== Alpine skiing ==
Boys

| Athlete | Event | Run 1 | | Run 2 | | Total | |
| Athlete | Event | Time | Rank | Time | Rank | Time | Rank |
|---|---|---|---|---|---|---|---|
| Auguste Aulnette | Super-G | —N/a | | | | 55.27 | 9 |
| Auguste Aulnette | Combined | 55.27 | 9 | 33.14 | 1 | 1:28.41 | 1st place, gold medalist(s) |
| Auguste Aulnette | Giant slalom | DNF | | | | | |
| Auguste Aulnette | Slalom | DSQ | | | | | |
| Victor Bessière | Super-G | —N/a | | | | 54.80 | 4 |
| Victor Bessière | Combined | 54.80 | 4 | 34.53 | 11 | 1:29.33 | 6 |
| Victor Bessière | Giant slalom | 1:04.82 | 9 | 1:05.54 | 13 | 2:10.36 | 12 |
| Victor Bessière | Slalom | DNF | | | | | |
| Baptiste Sambuis | Super-G | —N/a | | | | 55.44 | 13 |
| Baptiste Sambuis | Combined | 55.44 | 13 | 34.04 | 6 | 1:29.48 | 7 |
| Baptiste Sambuis | Giant slalom | 1:04.84 | 10 | 1:04.42 | 5 | 2:09.26 | 7 |
| Baptiste Sambuis | Slalom | 37.38 | 5 | 40.74 | 8 | 1:18.12 | 8 |

Girls

| Athlete | Event | Run 1 | | Run 2 | | Total | |
| Athlete | Event | Time | Rank | Time | Rank | Time | Rank |
|---|---|---|---|---|---|---|---|
| Alizée Dahon | Super-G | —N/a | | | | DNF | |
| Alizée Dahon | Combined | DNF | | | | | |
| Alizée Dahon | Giant slalom | 1:08.31 | 26 | DNF | | | |
| Alizée Dahon | Slalom | 48.40 | 22 | 45.24 | 9 | 1:33.64 | 14 |
| Caitlin McFarlane | Super-G | —N/a | | | | 56.35 | 2nd place, silver medalist(s) |
| Caitlin McFarlane | Combined | 56.35 | 2 | DNF | | | |
| Caitlin McFarlane | Giant slalom | 1:05.48 | 3 | 1:03.78 | 5 | 2:09.26 | 5 |
| Caitlin McFarlane | Slalom | DNF | | | | | |
| Chiara Pogneaux | Super-G | —N/a | | | | 58.72 | 27 |
| Chiara Pogneaux | Combined | 58.72 | 27 | 38.64 | 13 | 1:37.36 | 16 |
| Chiara Pogneaux | Giant slalom | 1:06.84 | 14 | 1:04.81 | 14 | 2:11.65 | 12 |
| Chiara Pogneaux | Slalom | 46.53 | 12 | 45.64 | 12 | 1:32.17 | 11 |

Mixed

| Athletes | Event | Round of 16 | Quarterfinals | Semifinals | Final / BM | |
| Athletes | Event | Opposition Score | Opposition Score | Opposition Score | Opposition Score | Rank |
|---|---|---|---|---|---|---|
| Caitlin McFarlane; Auguste Aulnette | Parallel mixed team | Canada; W 4–0 | United States; W 2*–2 | Finland; L 1–3 | Austria; L 2–2* | 4 |

== Biathlon ==
Boys

| Athlete | Event | Time | Misses | Rank |
|---|---|---|---|---|
| Mathieu Garcia | Sprint | 20:19.4 | 2 (0+2) | 12 |
| Mathieu Garcia | Individual | 35:04.3 | 3 (2+0+0+1) | 3rd place, bronze medalist(s) |
| Aubin Gautier-Pélissier | Sprint | 22:27.1 | 6 (5+1) | 47 |
| Aubin Gautier-Pélissier | Individual | 37:36.1 | 5 (2+2+0+1) | 18 |
| Théo Guiraud-Poillot | Sprint | 20:18.3 | 2 (1+1) | 11 |
| Théo Guiraud-Poillot | Individual | 38:32.5 | 7 (1+1+3+2) | 31 |
| Lou Thievent | Sprint | 21:28.5 | 4 (4+0) | 27 |
| Lou Thievent | Individual | 35:37.2 | 3 (0+2+0+1) | 7 |

Girls

| Athlete | Event | Time | Misses | Rank |
|---|---|---|---|---|
| Chloé Bened | Sprint | 20:13.4 | 3 (1+2) | 24 |
| Chloé Bened | Individual | 37:51.6 | 8 (2+3+0+3) | 33 |
| Fany Bertrand | Sprint | 19:57.9 | 3 (1+2) | 17 |
| Fany Bertrand | Individual | 35:27.8 | 5 (3+0+1+1) | 11 |
| Léonie Jeannier | Sprint | 19:26.2 | 1 (0+1) | 7 |
| Léonie Jeannier | Individual | 34:46.4 | 4 (1+1+1+1) | 6 |
| Jeanne Richard | Sprint | 20:44.1 | 4 (1+3) | 35 |
| Jeanne Richard | Individual | 33:30.5 | 2 (0+0+1+1) | 2nd place, silver medalist(s) |

Mixed

| Athletes | Event | Time | Misses | Rank |
|---|---|---|---|---|
| Jeanne Richard; Mathieu Garcia | Single mixed relay | 42:03.5 | 0+7 | 1st place, gold medalist(s) |
| Fany Bertrand; Léonie Jeannier; Théo Guiraud-Poillot; Mathieu Garcia | Single mixed relay | 1:12:23.9 | 1+13 | 3rd place, bronze medalist(s) |

== Cross-country skiing ==
Boys

| Athlete | Event | Qualification | | Quarterfinal | | Semifinal | | Final | |
| Athlete | Event | Time | Rank | Time | Rank | Time | Rank | Time | Rank |
|---|---|---|---|---|---|---|---|---|---|
| Simon Chappaz | 10 km classical | —N/a | | | | | | 28:05.4 | 11 |
| Simon Chappaz | Sprint freestyle | 3:25.66 | 26 Q | 3:32.35 | 5 | Did not advance | | | 23 |
| Simon Chappaz | Cross-country cross | 4:32.13 | 21 Q | —N/a | | 4:32.97 | 8 | Did not advance | 22 |
| Mattéo Correia | 10 km classical | —N/a | | | | | | 28:02.5 | 10 |
| Mattéo Correia | Sprint freestyle | 3:26.01 | 27 Q | 3:26.23 | 5 | Did not advance | | | 24 |
| Mattéo Correia | Cross-country cross | 4:40.13 | 39 | —N/a | | Did not advance | | | |
| Luc Primet | 10 km classical | —N/a | | | | | | 27:53.7 | 9 |
| Luc Primet | Sprint freestyle | 3:24.46 | 22 Q | 3:27.35 | 3 | Did not advance | | | 15 |
| Luc Primet | Cross-country cross | 4:33.35 | 23 Q | —N/a | | 4:37.80 | 10 | Did not advance | 29 |

Girls

| Athlete | Event | Qualification | | Quarterfinal | | Semifinal | | Final | |
| Athlete | Event | Time | Rank | Time | Rank | Time | Rank | Time | Rank |
|---|---|---|---|---|---|---|---|---|---|
| Zoé Favre-Bonvin | 5 km classical | —N/a | | | | | | 16:16.7 | 33 |
| Zoé Favre-Bonvin | Sprint freestyle | 3:07.20 | 51 | Did not advance | | | | | |
| Zoé Favre-Bonvin | Cross-country cross | 5:37.96 | 43 | —N/a | | Did not advance | | | |
| Julie Pierrel | 5 km classical | —N/a | | | | | | 15:11.6 | 13 |
| Julie Pierrel | Sprint freestyle | 2:50.29 | 13 Q | 2:55.67 | 3 | Did not advance | | | 15 |
| Julie Pierrel | Cross-country cross | 5:32.68 | 38 | —N/a | | Did not advance | | | |
| Maëlle Veyre | 5 km classical | —N/a | | | | | | 15:59.2 | 31 |
| Maëlle Veyre | Sprint freestyle | 2:50.00 | 12 Q | 2:52.57 | 3 | Did not advance | | | 14 |
| Maëlle Veyre | Cross-country cross | 5:07.44 | 11 Q | —N/a | | 5:17.94 | 8 | Did not advance | 22 |

== Curling ==
France qualified a mixed team of four athletes.

Mixed team

| Team | Event | Group stage | | | | | | Quarterfinal | Semifinal | Final / BM | |
| Team | Event | Opposition Score | Opposition Score | Opposition Score | Opposition Score | Opposition Score | Rank | Opposition Score | Opposition Score | Opposition Score | Rank |
|---|---|---|---|---|---|---|---|---|---|---|---|
| Léo Tuaz; Chana Beitone; Merlin Gros-Soubzmaigne; Maëlle Vergnaud | Mixed team | Great Britain; L 5–9 | New Zealand; L 4–6 | Slovenia; L 7–8 | Turkey; W 6–4 | Norway; L 6–11 | 6 | Did not advance | | | 23 |

Mixed doubles

| Athletes | Event | Round of 48 | Round of 24 | Round of 12 | Round of 6 | Semifinals | Final / BM | |
| Athletes | Event | Opposition Result | Opposition Result | Opposition Result | Opposition Result | Opposition Result | Opposition Result | Rank |
|---|---|---|---|---|---|---|---|---|
| Chana Beitone (FRA); Nikolay Lysakov (RUS) | Mixed doubles | Rajala (CAN); Sever (SLO); W 10–9 | Antes (GER); Szarvas (HUN); W 8–2 | Lasmane (LAT); Becker (NZL); W 10–5 | Wosińska (POL); Zhang (CHN); W 14–4 | Pei (CHN); Chabičovský (CZE); W 10–5 | Nagy (HUN); Young (CAN); L 5–9 | 2nd place, silver medalist(s) |
| Zoe Harman (NZL); Merlin Gros-Soubzmaigne (FRA) | Mixed doubles | Wosińska (POL); Zhang (CHN); L 2–8 | Did not advance | | | | | 25 |
| Mina Kobayashi (JPN); Léo Tuaz (FRA) | Mixed doubles | Pražáková (CZE); Moon (KOR); W 6–5 | Jensen (DEN); Zhai (CHN); W 8–7 | Szmidt (POL); Rankin (GBR); W 9–2 | Nagy (HUN); Young (CAN); L 1–8 LL | Nagy (HUN); Young (CAN); L 2–6 | Pei (CHN); Chabičovský (CZE); L 3–7 | 4 |
| Maëlle Vergnaud (FRA); Grunde Burås (NOR) | Mixed doubles | Sutor (GER); Thompson (USA); W 7–5 | Deschenes (CAN); Gasto (ESP); W 8–2 | Bitmete (LAT); Maeda (JPN); W 9–8 | Pei (CHN); Chabičovský (CZE); L 3–7 | Did not advance | | 5 |

== Figure skating ==
Six French figure skaters achieved quota places for France based on the results of the 2019 World Junior Figure Skating Championships.

Singles

| Athlete | Event | SP | | FS | | Total | |
| Athlete | Event | Points | Rank | Points | Rank | Points | Rank |
|---|---|---|---|---|---|---|---|
| François Pitot | Boys' singles | 53.02 | 11 | 101.02 | 12 | 154.04 | 13 |
| Maïa Mazzara | Girls' singles | 59.48 | 8 | 106.68 | 9 | 166.16 | 9 |

Couples

| Athletes | Event | SP/SD | | FS/FD | | Total | |
| Athletes | Event | Points | Rank | Points | Rank | Points | Rank |
|---|---|---|---|---|---|---|---|
| Célina Fradji; Jean-Hans Fourneaux | Ice dancing | 49.11 | 9 | 72.13 | 10 | 121.24 | 10 |

Mixed NOC team trophy

| Athletes | Event | Free skate/Free dance | | | | | |
| Athletes | Event | Ice dance | Pairs | Girls | Boys | Total | |
| Athletes | Event | Points Team points | Points Team points | Points Team points | Points Team points | Points | Rank |
|---|---|---|---|---|---|---|---|
| Team Discovery; Célina Fradji / Jean-Hans Fourneaux (FRA); Apollinariia Panfilova / Dmitry Rylov (RUS); Cathérine Carle (CAN); Nikolaj Memola (ITA) | Team trophy | 75.86; 2 | 126.49; 8 | 91.22; 1 | 112.27; 4 | 15 | 6 |
| Team Hope; Miku Makita / Tyler Gunara (CAN); Letizia Roscher / Luis Schuster (GER); Maïa Mazzara (FRA); Liam Kapeikis (USA) | Team trophy | 89.87; 4 | 78.24; 1 | 103.36; 5 | 117.28; 5 | 15 | 8 |

== Freestyle skiing ==
Ski cross

| Athlete | Event | Group heats | | Semifinal | Final |
| Athlete | Event | Points | Rank | Position | Position |
|---|---|---|---|---|---|
| Tom Barnoin | Boys' ski cross | 15 | 6 | Did not advance | |
| Léa Hudry | Girls' ski cross | 18 | 3 Q | 3 SF | 6 |

Slopestyle & Big Air

| Athlete | Event | Qualification | | | | Final | | | | |
| Athlete | Event | Run 1 | Run 2 | Best | Rank | Run 1 | Run 2 | Run 3 | Best | Rank |
|---|---|---|---|---|---|---|---|---|---|---|
| Kaditane Gomis | Boys' big air | 49.25 | 16.75 | 49.25 | 22 | Did not advance | | | | |
| Kaditane Gomis | Boys' slopestyle | 14.33 | 14.33 | 14.33 | 25 | Did not advance | | | | |
| Ivana Mermillod Blondin | Girls' big air | 40.00 | 67.00 | 67.00 | 8 Q | DNS | | | | 11 |
| Jade Michaud | Girls' big air | 75.33 | 19.33 | 75.33 | 5 Q | 46.25 | 69.50 | 55.50 | 125.00 | 6 |
| Jade Michaud | Girls' slopestyle | 18.25 | 63.75 | 63.75 | 7 Q | 81.25 | 62.75 | 9.75 | 81.25 | 5 |

== Nordic combined ==
Individual

| Athlete | Event | Ski jumping | | | | Cross-country | |
| Athlete | Event | Distance | Points | Rank | Deficit | Time | Rank |
|---|---|---|---|---|---|---|---|
| Mattéo Baud | Boys' normal hill/6 km | 84.0 | 114.7 | 5 | 0:24 | 15:17.3 | 4 |
| Marco Heinis | Boys' normal hill/6 km | 84.0 | 114.6 | 6 | 0:24 | 16:00.3 | 11 |
| Maëla Didier | Girls' normal hill/4 km | 58.5 | 63.6 | 22 | 3:09 | 15:37.6 | 21 |
| Emma Tréand | Girls' normal hill/4 km | 72.0 | 94.1 | 12 | 1:38 | 14:13.1 | 13 |

== Short track speed skating ==
Two French skaters achieved quota places for France based on the results of the 2019 World Junior Short Track Speed Skating Championships.

Boys

| Athlete | Event | Heats | | Quarterfinal | | Semifinal | | Final | |
| Athlete | Event | Time | Rank | Time | Rank | Time | Rank | Time | Rank |
|---|---|---|---|---|---|---|---|---|---|
| Gabriel Volet | 500 m | 42.812 | 2 Q | 43.583 | 3 | Did not advance | | | 11 |
| Gabriel Volet | 1000 m | 1:33.083 | 3 | Did not advance | | | | | 20 |

Girls

| Athlete | Event | Heats | | Quarterfinal | | Semifinal | | Final | |
| Athlete | Event | Time | Rank | Time | Rank | Time | Rank | Time | Rank |
|---|---|---|---|---|---|---|---|---|---|
| Cloé Ollivier | 500 m | 46.046 | 2 Q | 45.624 | 4 | Did not advance | | | 13 |
| Cloé Ollivier | 1000 m | 1:38.981 | 3 | Did not advance | | | | | 19 |

== Ski jumping ==
| Athlete | Event | First round | | | Final | | | Total | |
| Athlete | Event | Distance | Points | Rank | Distance | Points | Rank | Points | Rank |
|---|---|---|---|---|---|---|---|---|---|
| Valentin Foubert | Boys' normal hill | 83.0 | 105.5 | 13 | 84.0 | 110.8 | 10 | 216.3 | 10 |
| Enzo Milesi | Boys' normal hill | 81.0 | 102.8 | 15 | 82.0 | 102.9 | 16 | 205.7 | 16 |
| Joséphine Pagnier | Girls' normal hill | 82.0 | 124.2 | 1 | 79.5 | 98.6 | 3 | 222.8 | 2nd place, silver medalist(s) |
| Emma Tréand; Marco Heinis; Joséphine Pagnier; Valentin Foubert | Mixed team | 319.0 | 439.7 | 5 | 312.5 | 447.0 | 4 | 886.7 | 3rd place, bronze medalist(s) |

== Ski mountaineering ==
Individual

| Athlete | Event | Time | Rank |
|---|---|---|---|
| Anselme Damevin | Boys' individual | 52:23.10 | 10 |
| Bazil Ducouret | Boys' individual | 54:03.20 | 13 |
| Victoire Berger | Girls' individual | 1:05:29.14 | 8 |
| Margot Ravinel | Girls' individual | 1:00:28.95 | 3rd place, bronze medalist(s) |

Sprint

| Athlete | Event | Qualification | | Quarterfinal | | Semifinal | | Final | |
| Athlete | Event | Time | Rank | Time | Rank | Time | Rank | Time | Rank |
|---|---|---|---|---|---|---|---|---|---|
| Anselme Damevin | Boys' sprint | 3:05.86 | 12 | 2:56.71 | 4 | Did not advance | | | |
| Bazil Ducouret | Boys' sprint | 2:49.37 | 2 | 2:48.85 | 1 Q | 2:48.11 | 5 | Did not advance | |
| Victoire Berger | Girls' sprint | 3:45.26 | 6 | 3:36.55 | 3 Q | 3:35.75 | 5 | did notadvance | |
| Margot Ravinel | Girls' sprint | 3:38.95 | 4 | 3:27.96 | 2 Q | 3:20.91 | 3 Q | 3:25.85 | 3rd place, bronze medalist(s) |

Mixed

| Athlete | Event | Time | Rank |
|---|---|---|---|
| Victoire Berger; Bazil Ducouret; Margot Ravinel; Anselme Damevin | Mixed relay | 37:11 | 2nd place, silver medalist(s) |

== Snowboarding ==
Snowboard cross

| Athlete | Event | Group heats | | Semifinal | Final |
| Athlete | Event | Points | Rank | Position | Position |
|---|---|---|---|---|---|
| Noa Coutton-Jean | Boys' snowboard cross | 14 | 6 | Did not advance | |
| Quentin Sodogas | Boys' snowboard cross | 18 | 2 Q | 1 BF | 4 |
| Margaux Herpin | Girls' snowboard cross | 20 | 1 Q | 1 BF | 2nd place, silver medalist(s) |
| Chloé Passerat | Girls' snowboard cross | 15 | 6 | Did not advance | |

== See also ==
- France at the 2020 Summer Olympics
