= Ski jumping at the 2020 Winter Youth Olympics – Boys' individual normal hill =

Boys' individual normal hill at the III Winter Youth Olympic Games
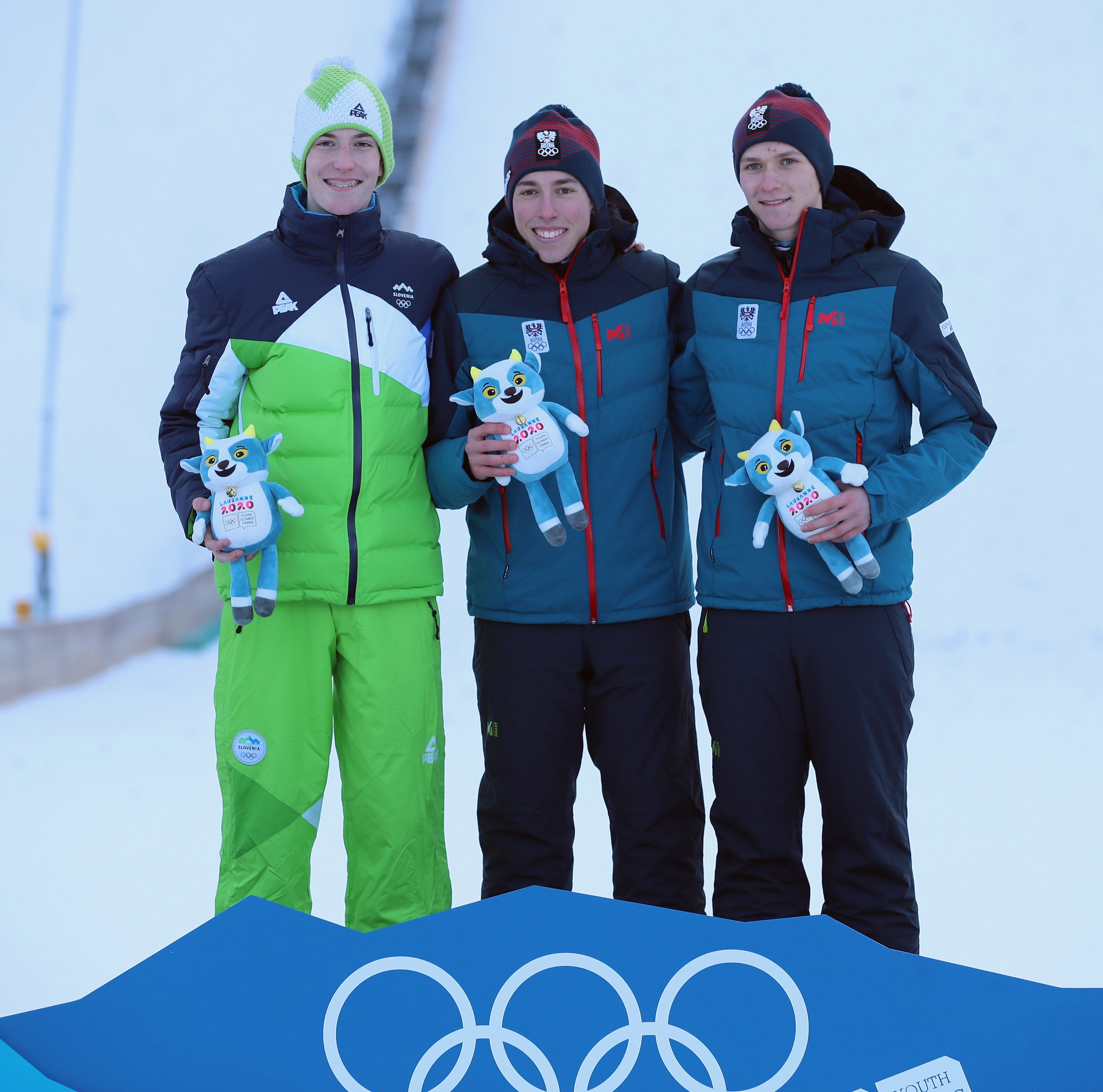
- Venue: Les Tuffes Nordic Centre
- Dates: 19 January
- Competitors: 37 from 20 nations
- Winning points: 257.7

Medalists
1st place, gold medalist(s)		Marco Wörgötter	Austria
2nd place, silver medalist(s)		Mark Hafnar	Slovenia
3rd place, bronze medalist(s)		David Haagen	Austria

The boys' ski jumping event at the 2020 Winter Youth Olympics was held on 19 January at the Les Tuffes Nordic Centre.

== Results ==
The first round was started at 14:00 and the final round at 15:20.

Rank	Bib	Name	Country	Round 1			Final round			Total
Rank	Bib	Name	Country	Distance (m)	Points	Rank	Distance (m)	Points	Rank	Points
1st place, gold medalist(s)	27	Marco Wörgötter	Austria	91.5	130.9	1	90.0	126.8	1	257.7
2nd place, silver medalist(s)	24	Mark Hafnar	Slovenia	91.0	121.9	4	89.0	125.2	2	247.1
3rd place, bronze medalist(s)	2	David Haagen	Austria	88.0	123.0	2	86.0	121.5	3	244.5
4	23	Danil Sadreev	Russia	87.0	122.1	3	85.5	121.3	4	243.4
5	4	Ilya Mankov	Russia	89.0	118.7	5	85.0	117.8	6	236.5
6	15	Jernej Presečnik	Slovenia	88.0	118.1	6	81.5	115.7	7	233.8
7	28	Adam Niżnik	Poland	85.0	115.2	7	82.5	114.8	8	230.0
8	20	Iver Olaussen	Norway	84.5	111.1	8	87.5	118.4	5	229.5
9	22	Danil Vassilyev	Kazakhstan	87.0	110.7	9	85.5	110.1	12	220.8
10	29	Valentin Foubert	France	83.0	105.5	13	84.0	110.8	10	216.3
11	6	Jiří Konvalinka	Czech Republic	81.5	106.0	12	83.0	108.7	13	214.7
12	37	Lean Niederberger	Switzerland	73.5	107.9	11	84.0	106.6	14	214.5
13	8	Luca Geyer	Germany	83.0	101.4	19	84.0	110.9	9	212.3
14	17	Mattia Galiani	Italy	79.0	101.0	20	83.0	110.5	11	211.5
15	32	Daniel Moroder	Italy	82.5	110.6	10	81.0	97.9	19	208.5
16	1	Enzo Milesi	France	81.0	102.8	15	82.0	102.9	16	205.7
17	33	Finn Braun	Germany	70.0	98.8	21	80.0	103.3	15	202.1
18	26	Sam Bolton	Great Britain	86.5	97.7	23	82.0	102.2	17	199.9
19	34	Flórián Molnár	Hungary	84.0	101.8	18	77.5	97.4	20	199.2
20	11	Yanick Wasser	Switzerland	81.0	102.0	17	80.5	96.3	21	198.3
21	14	Simen Markeng	Norway	80.0	97.9	22	77.5	98.5	18	196.4
22	18	Erik Belshaw	United States	82.0	102.2	16	75.5	93.8	24	196.0
23	5	Jan Habdas	Poland	82.0	103.1	14	75.0	89.0	26	192.1
24	25	Markkus Alter	Estonia	80.5	92.5	24	76.5	96.0	22	188.5
25	35	Petr Vaverka	Czech Republic	74.0	90.1	25	78.5	95.2	23	185.3
26	9	Nurshat Tursunzhanov	Kazakhstan	70.0	89.6	26	78.0	93.5	25	183.1
27	21	Kasperi Valto	Finland	76.0	84.5	27	72.5	83.7	29	168.2
28	31	Anton Korchuk	Ukraine	72.5	80.4	29	69.5	84.0	27	164.4
29	10	Tomas Kuisma	Finland	72.5	79.4	30	69.5	84.0	27	163.4
30	36	Stéphane Tremblay	Canada	72.0	81.7	28	66.5	71.3	34	153.0
31	12	Florin Feroiu	Romania	72.0	76.4	31	66.0	75.7	32	152.1
32	3	Landon Lee	United States	68.0	73.1	32	67.5	76.4	31	149.5
33	13	Karel Rammo	Estonia	68.5	69.5	33	68.5	78.5	30	148.0
34	16	Yurii Yaniuk	Ukraine	66.5	68.3	34	68.5	69.3	35	137.6
35	30	Robert Săndulescu	Romania	62.5	52.0	35	59.5	68.2	36	120.2
36	7	Noah Rolseth	Canada	52.0	40.4	36	58.0	75.3	33	115.7
37	19	Sota Kudo	Japan	Disqualified			Did not start			0.0

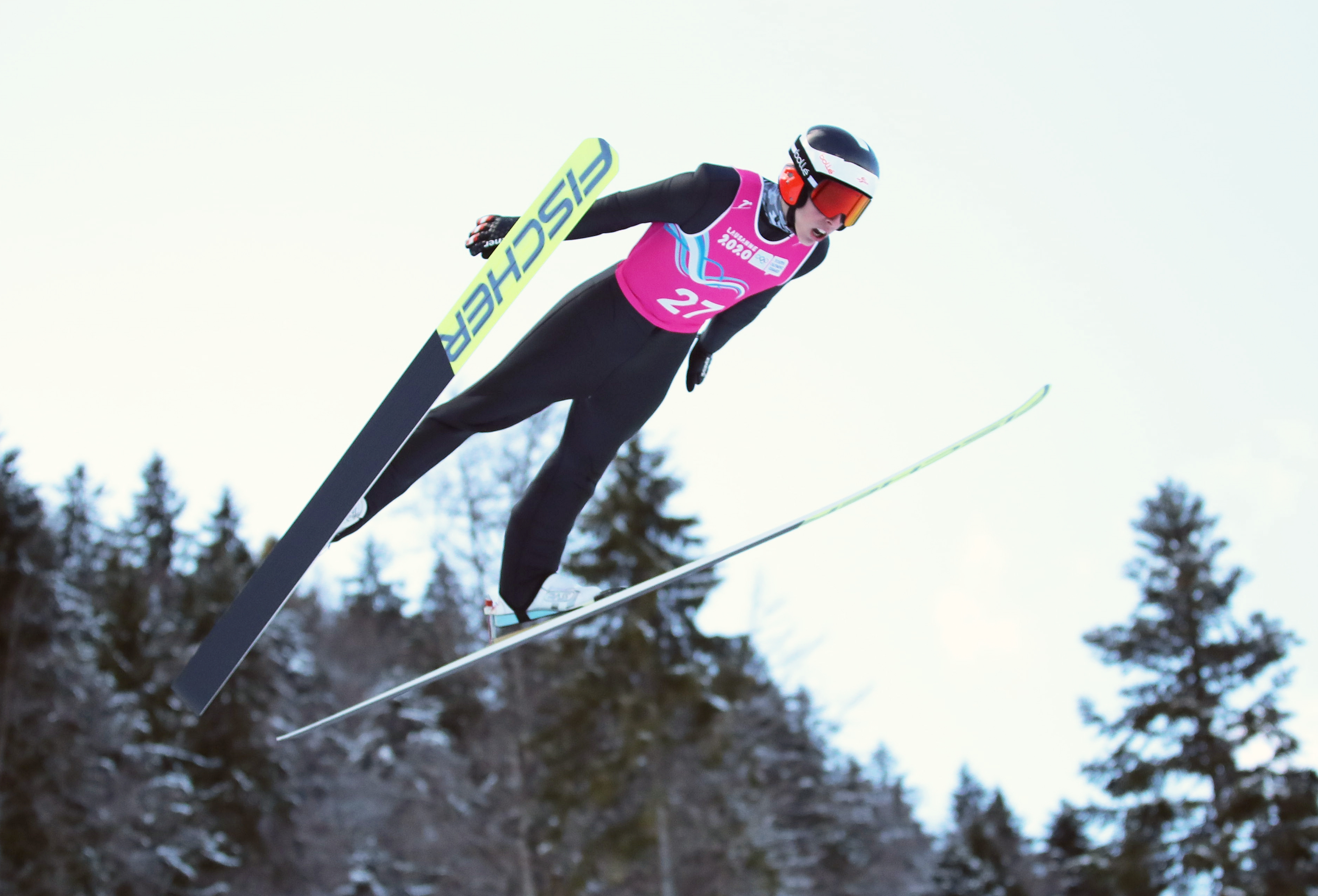
Marco Wörgötter

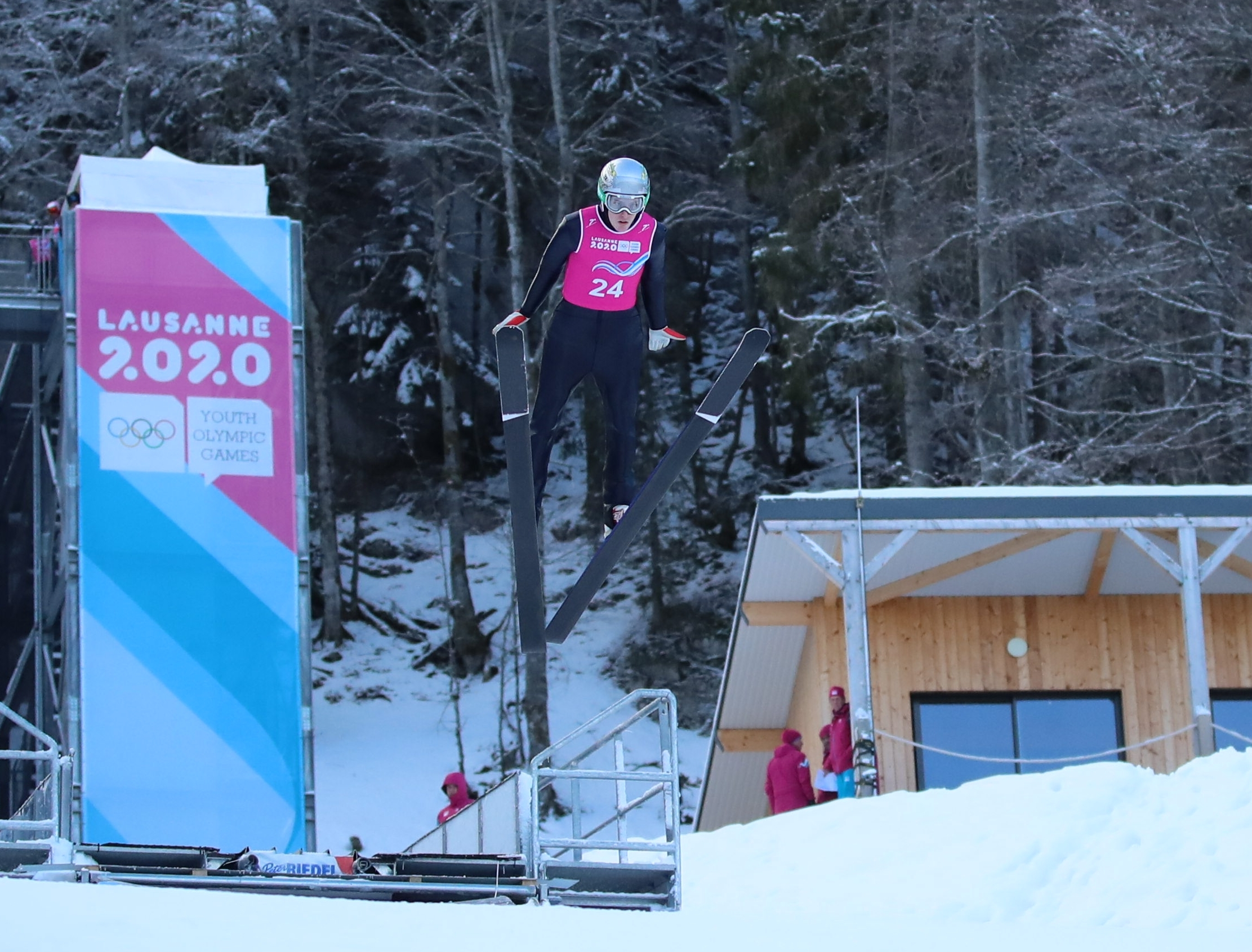
Mark Hafnar

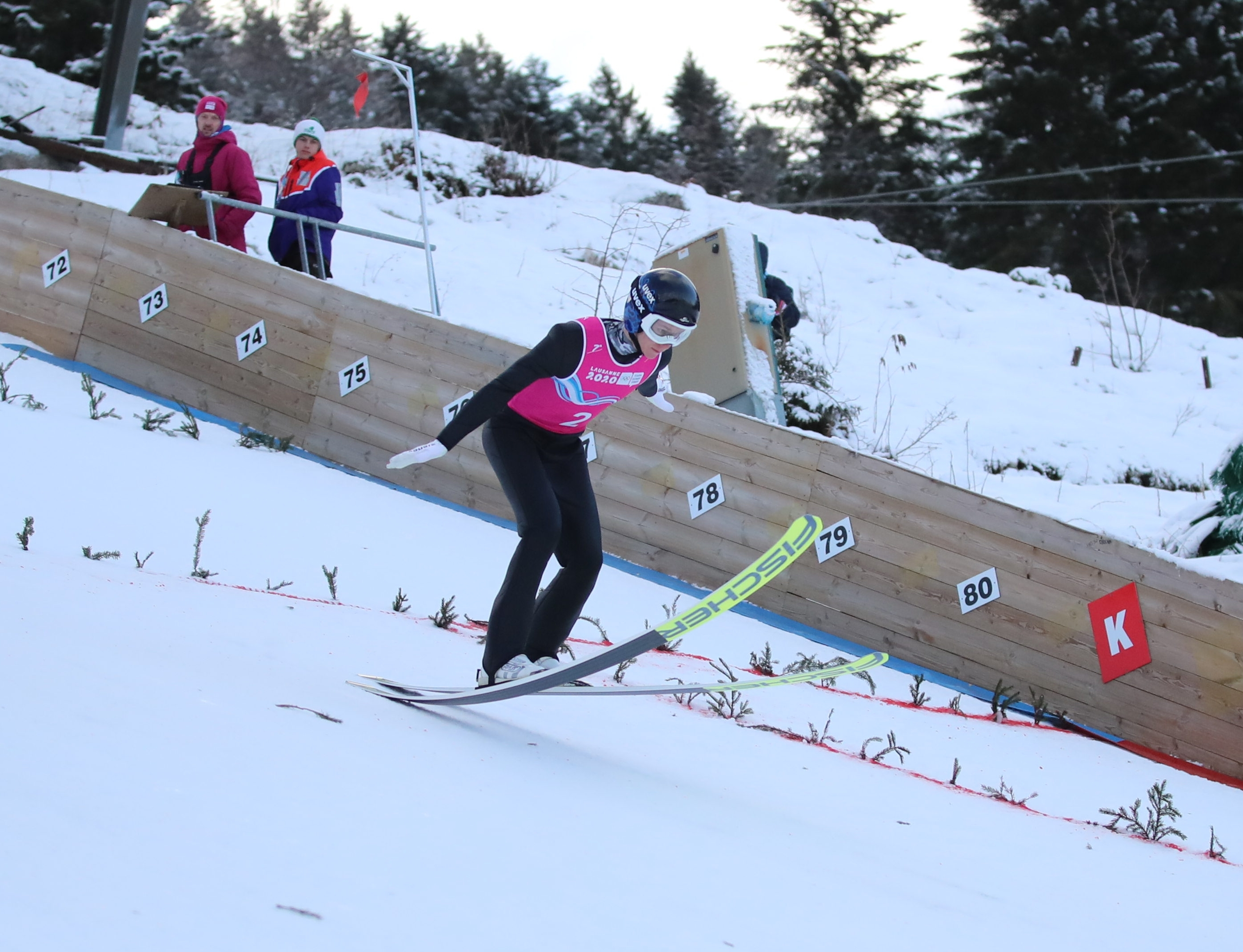
David Haagen
