= Alpine skiing at the 2020 Winter Youth Olympics – Girls' super-G =

Girls' super-G at the III Winter Youth Olympic Games
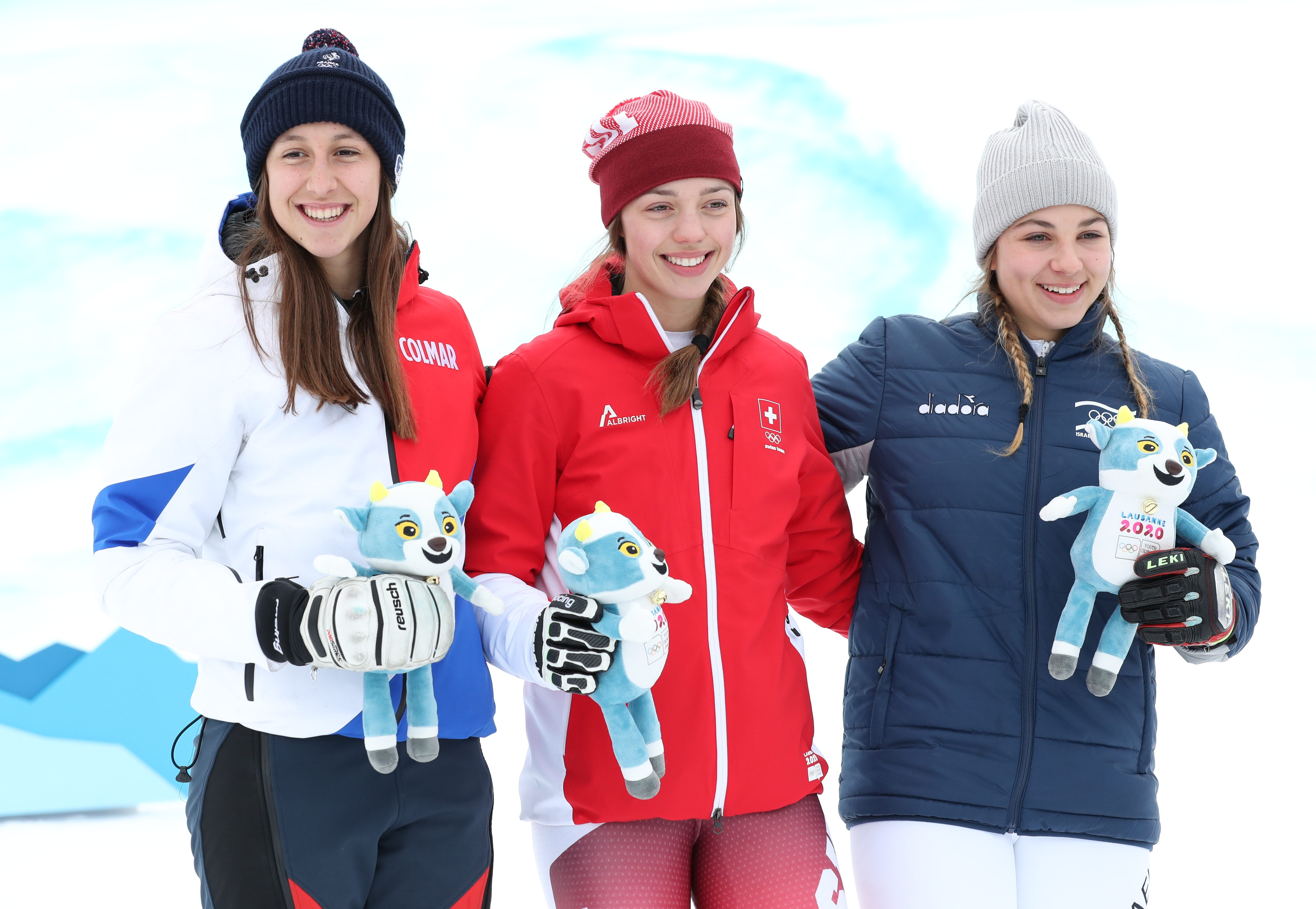
- McFarlane, Klopfenstein and Szollos
- Venue: Les Diablerets, Switzerland
- Date: 10 January
- Competitors: 59 from 38 nations
- Winning time: 56.27

Medalists
1st place, gold medalist(s)		Amélie Klopfenstein	Switzerland
2nd place, silver medalist(s)		Caitlin McFarlane	France
3rd place, bronze medalist(s)		Noa Szollos	Israel

The girls' Super-G competition of the 2020 Winter Youth Olympics was held at the Les Diablerets Alpine Centre, Switzerland, on Friday, 10 January.

== Results ==
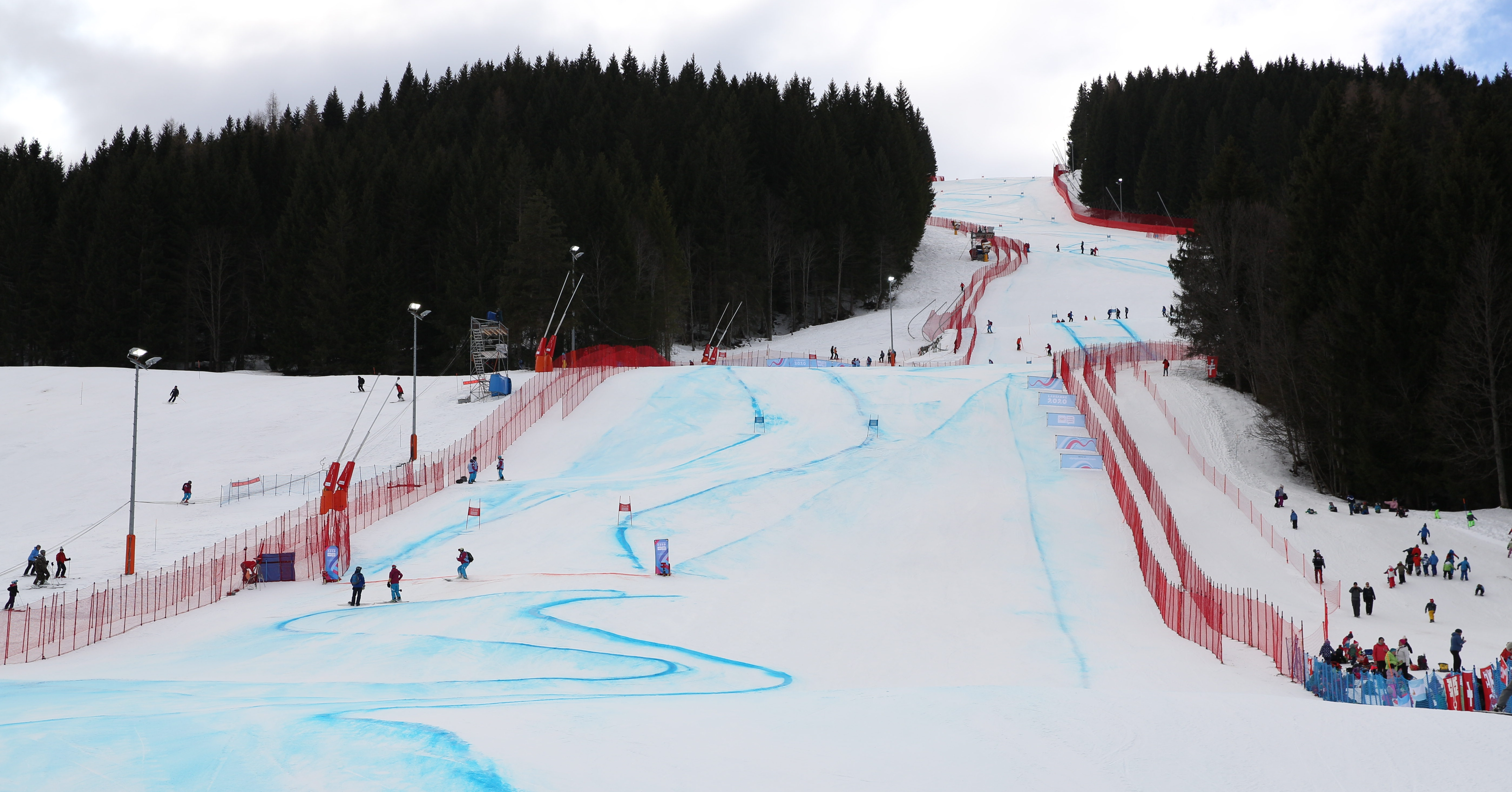
Les Diablerets Alpine Centre

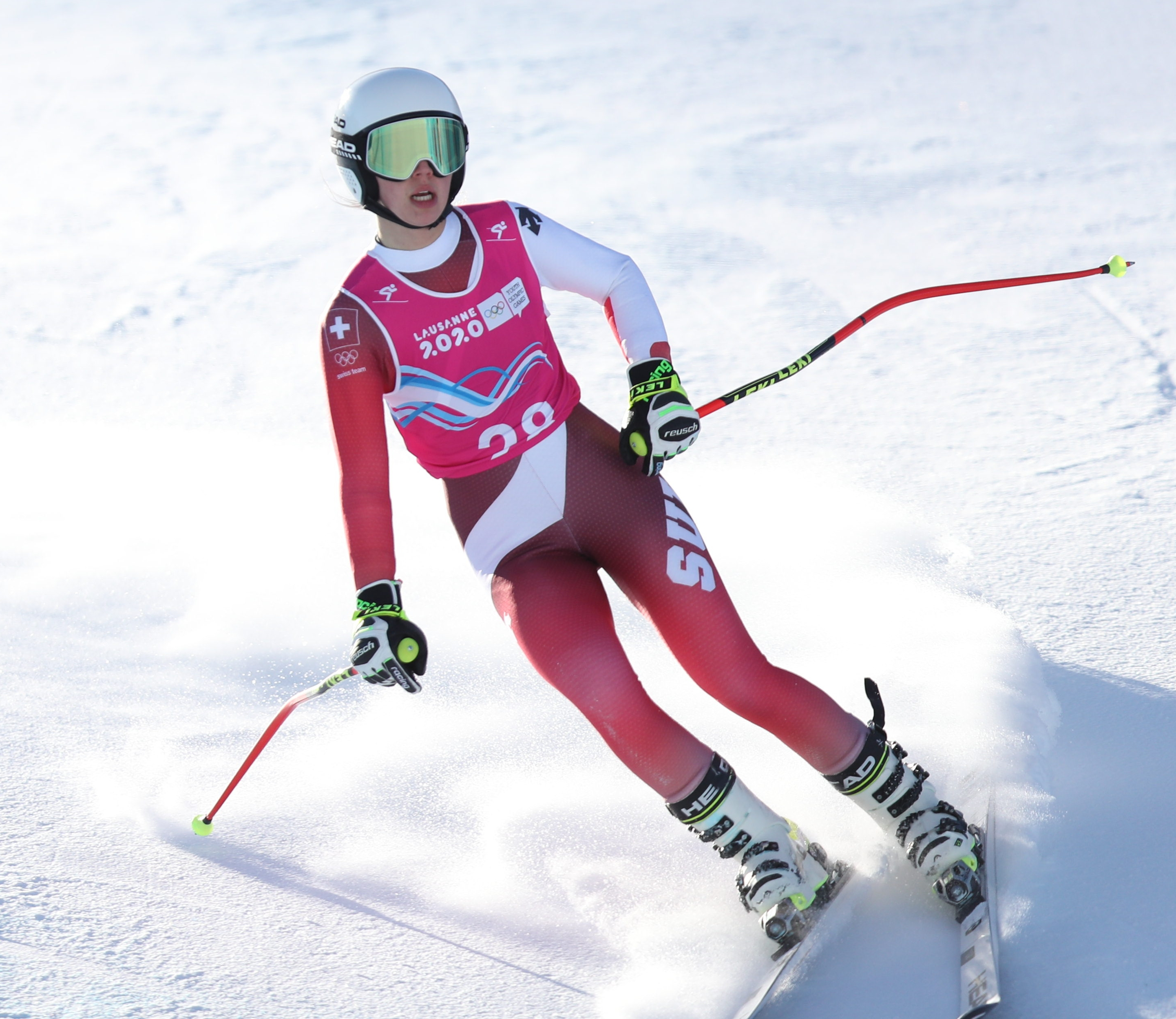
Amélie Klopfenstein

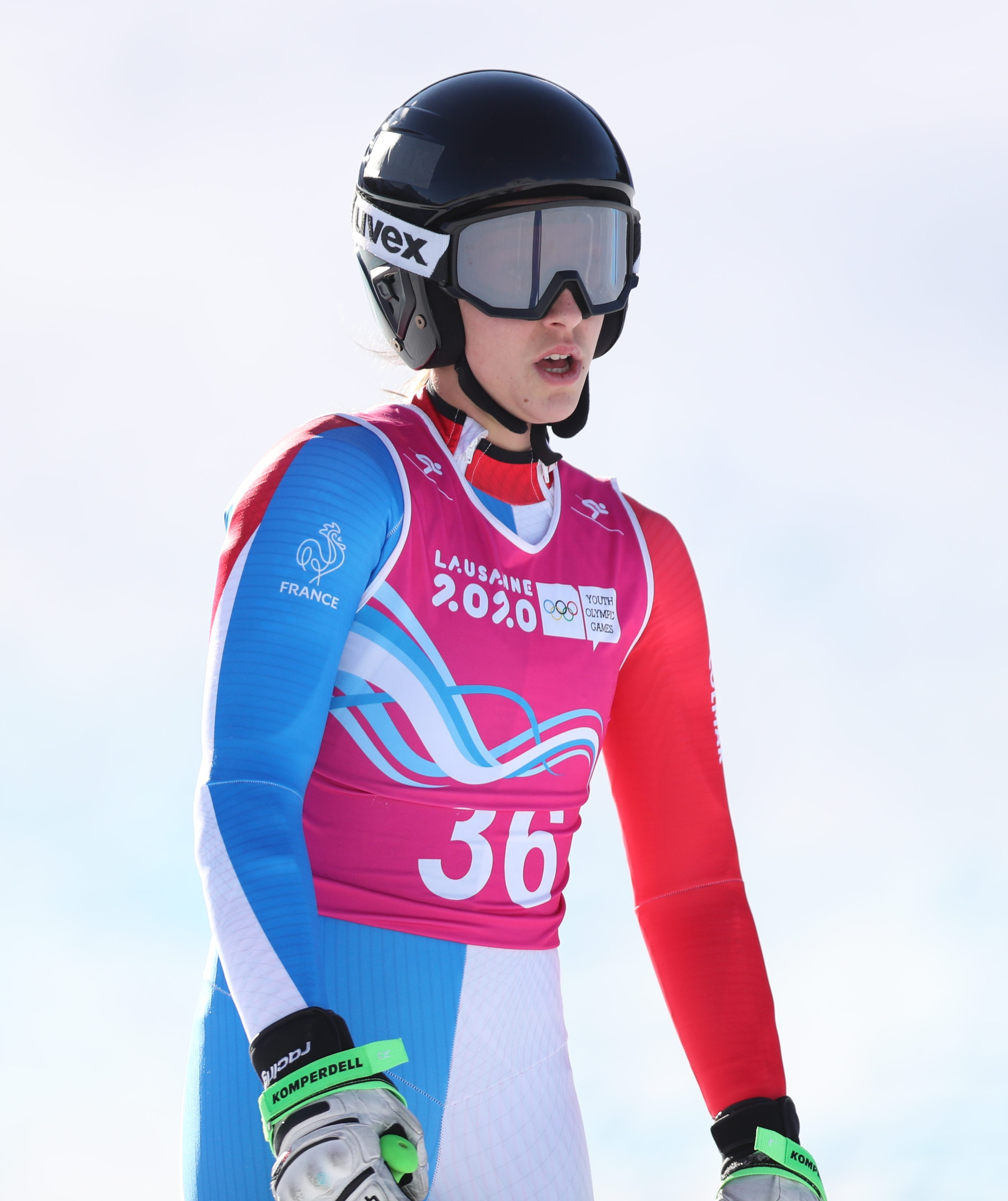
Caitlin McFarlane

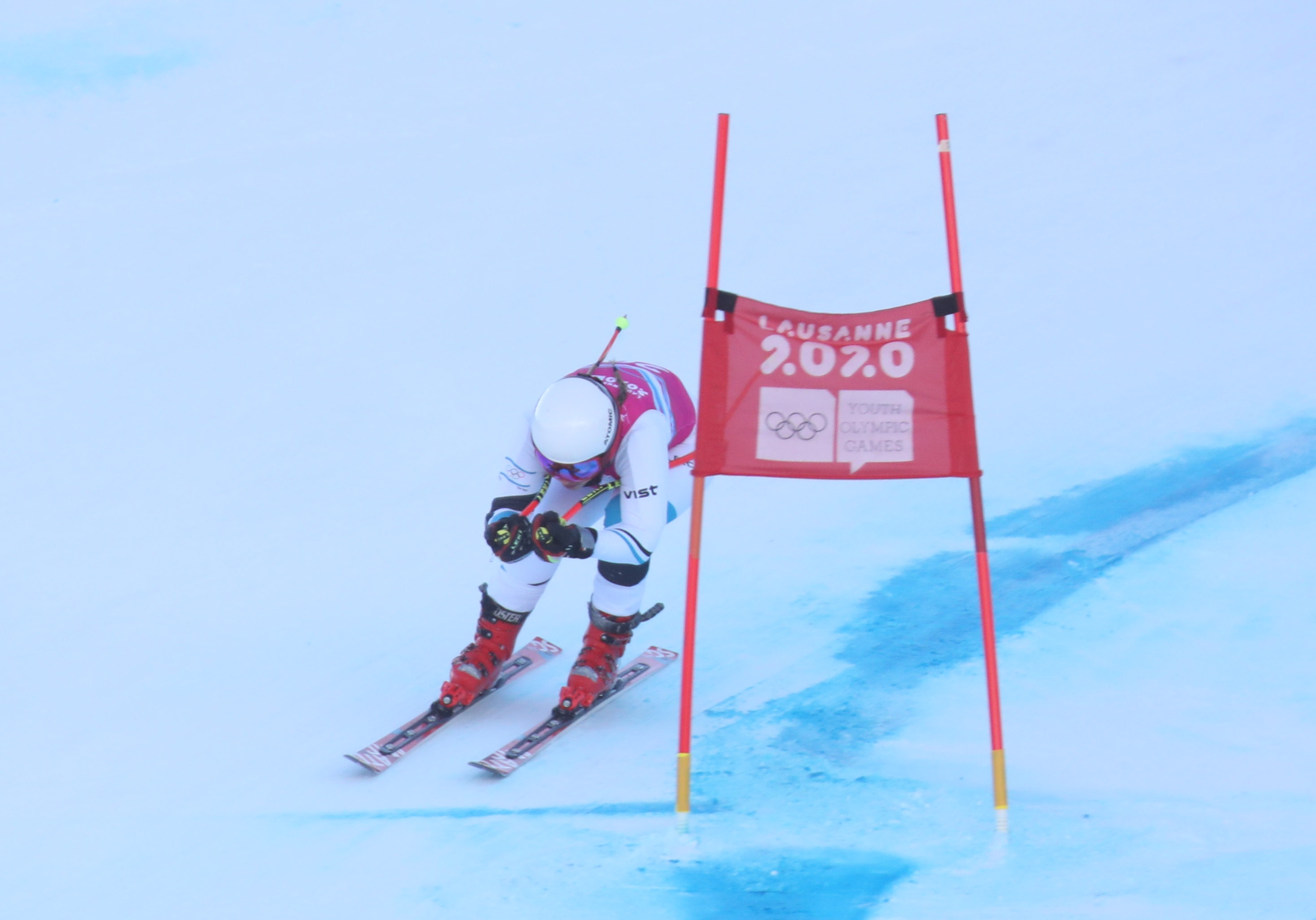
Noa Szollos

The race was started at 10:15.

Rank	Bib	Name	Country	Time	Difference
1st place, gold medalist(s)	28	Amélie Klopfenstein	Switzerland	56.27	
2nd place, silver medalist(s)	36	Caitlin McFarlane	France	56.35	+0.08
3rd place, bronze medalist(s)	26	Noa Szollos	Israel	56.36	+0.09
4	11	Amanda Salzgeber	Austria	56.40	+0.13
5	7	Hanna Aronsson Elfman	Sweden	56.70	+0.43
6	14	Alica Calaba	Italy	56.75	+0.48
7	13	Maria Niederndorfer	Austria	56.97	+0.70
8	32	Rebeka Jančová	Slovakia	56.99	+0.72
9	19	Teresa Fritzenwallner	Austria	57.11	+0.84
10	37	Zoja Grbović	Serbia	57.13	+0.86
11	57	Emma Resnick	United States	57.21	+0.94
12	22	Sophie Mathiou	Italy	57.29	+1.02
13	17	Wilma Marklund	Sweden	57.32	+1.05
14	10	Delia Durrer	Switzerland	57.35	+1.08
15	5	Emma Sahlin	Sweden	57.39	+1.12
16	40	Zita Tóth	Hungary	57.47	+1.20
17	6	Malin Sofie Sund	Norway	57.51	+1.24
18	30	Daisi Daniels	Great Britain	57.82	+1.55
19	21	Cathinka Lunder	Norway	57.85	+1.58
20	9	Lina Knifič	Slovenia	57.85	+1.58
21	3	Katharina Haas	Germany	57.91	+1.64
22	1	Lara Klein	Germany	57.97	+1.70
23	31	Annette Belfrond	Italy	58.08	+1.81
24	18	Rosa Pohjolainen	Finland	58.42	+2.15
25	34	Christina Bühler	Liechtenstein	58.52	+2.25
26	2	Matilde Schwencke	Chile	58.67	+2.40
27	24	Chiara Pogneaux	France	58.72	+2.45
28	43	Vanina Guerillot	Portugal	59.10	+2.83
29	35	Carla Mijares	Andorra	59.12	+2.85
29	4	Nika Murovec	Slovenia	59.12	+2.85
31	20	Maisa Kivimäki	Finland	59.55	+3.28
32	42	Jana Suau	Spain	59.64	+3.37
33	29	Sophie Foster	Great Britain	1:00.33	+4.06
34	39	Adalbjörg Lilly Hauksdóttir	Iceland	1:00.51	+4.24
35	46	Esperanza Pereyra	Argentina	1:00.85	+4.58
36	56	Anastasia Trofimova	Russia	1:01.14	+4.87
37	27	Anja Oplotnik	Slovenia	1:01.19	+4.92
38	44	Sofía Saint Antonin	Argentina	1:01.32	+5.05
39	62	Lee Hae-un	South Korea	1:01.61	+5.34
40	48	Diana Andreea Renţea	Romania	1:01.88	+5.61
41	50	Yuka Wakatsuki	Japan	1:02.38	+6.11
42	47	Abigail Vieira	Trinidad and Tobago	1:02.58	+6.31
43	38	Zoe Michael	Australia	1:03.02	+6.75
44	45	Kateryna Shepilenko	Ukraine	1:04.14	+7.87
45	53	Alexandra Troitskaya	Kazakhstan	1:04.42	+8.15
46	52	Mia Nuriah Freudweiler	Pakistan	1:04.98	+8.71
47	49	Gabriela Hopek	Poland	1:05.37	+9.10
48	60	Isabella Davis	Australia	1:05.52	+9.25
49	61	Daniela Payen	Mexico	1:06.17	+9.90
50	59	Maria Nikoleta Kaltsogianni	Greece	1:12.35	+16.08
	8	Lauren Macuga	United States	Did not finish	
	12	Barbora Nováková	Czech Republic	Did not finish	
	15	Alice Marchessault	Canada	Did not finish	
	16	Nicola Rountree-Williams	United States	Did not finish	
	23	Alizée Dahon	France	Did not finish	
	33	Lena Volken	Switzerland	Did not finish	
	41	Kristiane Rør Madsen	Denmark	Did not finish	
	55	Sara Madelene Marøy	Norway	Did not finish	
	58	Julia Zlatkova	Bulgaria	Did not finish	
	25	Sarah Brown	Canada	Did not start	
	51	Artemis Hoseyni	Iran	Did not start	
	54	Sarah Escobar	Ecuador	Did not start	
