= Ski jumping at the 2020 Winter Youth Olympics – Mixed team normal hill =

Mixed team normal hill at the III Winter Youth Olympic Games
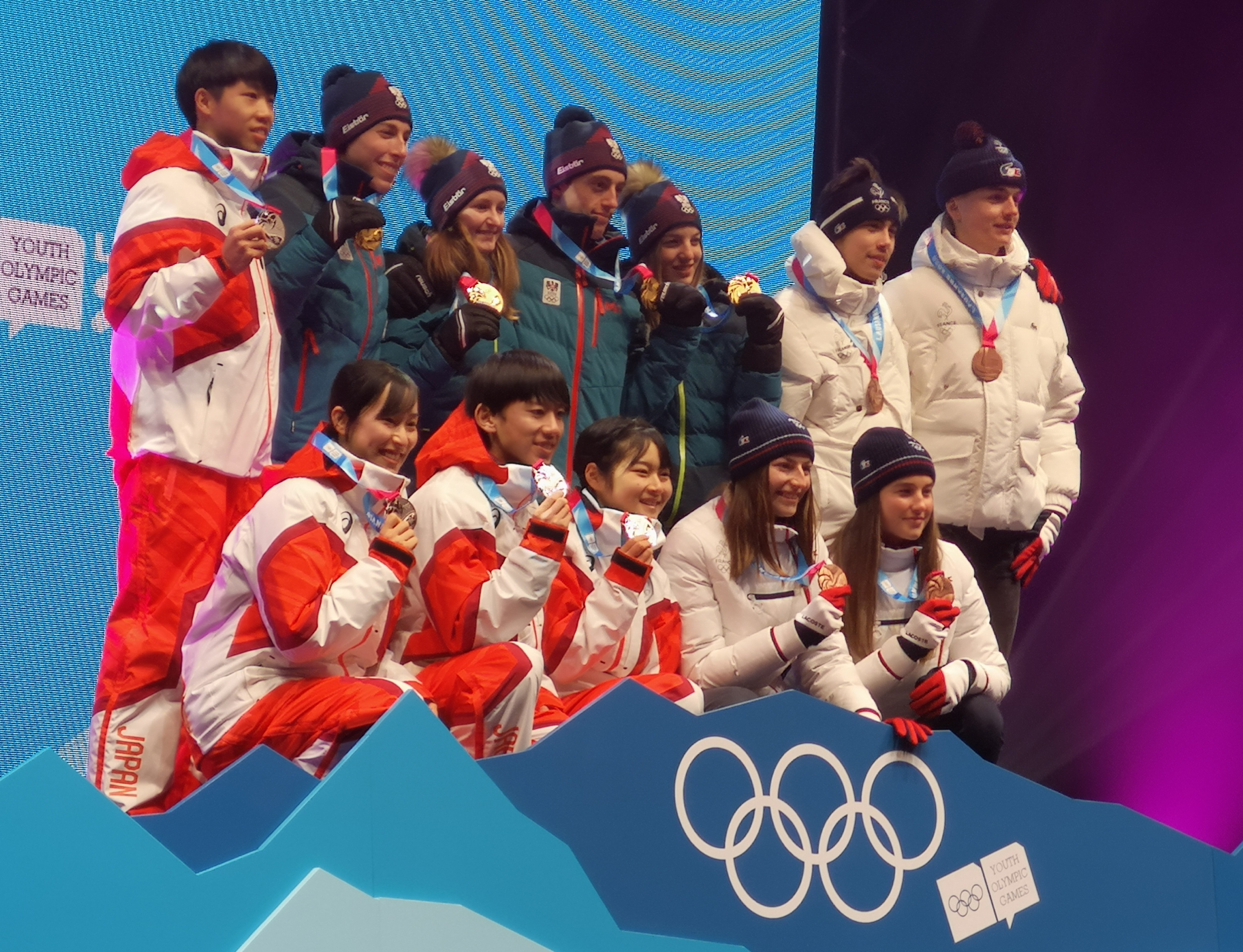
- Venue: Les Tuffes Nordic Centre
- Dates: 20 January
- Competitors: 47 from 12 nations
- Winning points: 986.4

Medalists
1st place, gold medalist(s)		Lisa Hirner; Stefan Rettenegger; Julia Mühlbacher; Marco Wörgötter	Austria
2nd place, silver medalist(s)		Ayane Miyazaki; Yuto Nishikata; Machiko Kubota; Sota Kudo	Japan
3rd place, bronze medalist(s)		Emma Treand; Marco Heinis; Joséphine Pagnier; Valentin Foubert	France

The mixed team ski jumping event at the 2020 Winter Youth Olympics was held on 20 January at the Les Tuffes Nordic Centre.

== Results ==
The first round was started at 10:30 and the final round at 11:50.

			Round 1			Final round			Total
Rank	Bib	Country	Distance (m)	Points	Rank	Distance (m)	Points	Rank	Points
1st place, gold medalist(s)	10; 10–1; 10–2; 10–3; 10–4	Austria; Lisa Hirner; Stefan Rettenegger; Julia Mühlbacher; Marco Wörgötter	80.0; 85.0; 82.0; 91.5	499.9; 112.1; 131.8; 124.7; 131.3	1	81.0; 84.0; 82.0; 80.0	486.5; 118.5; 131.0; 114.0; 123.0	1	986.4
2nd place, silver medalist(s)	5; 5–1; 5–2; 5–3; 5–4	Japan; Ayane Miyazaki; Yuto Nishikata; Machiko Kubota; Sota Kudo	79.0; 85.5; 83.0; 83.0	471.6; 110.6; 122.5; 114.8; 123.7	2	78.0; 80.0; 77.0; 86.5	466.4; 112.1; 121.8; 107.3; 125.2	2	938.0
3rd place, bronze medalist(s)	8; 8–1; 8–2; 8–3; 8–4	France; Emma Treand; Marco Heinis; Joséphine Pagnier; Valentin Foubert	71.0; 88.0; 87.0; 73.0	439.7; 96.0; 124.3; 122.6; 96.8	5	70.0; 84.0; 82.5; 76.0	447.0; 96.3; 123.0; 121.3; 106.4	4	886.7
4	9; 9–1; 9–2; 9–3; 9–4	Russia; Aleksandra Tikhonovich; Vladimir Malov; Anna Shpyneva; Danil Sadreev	62.0; 80.0; 84.0; 84.5	447.3; 81.4; 117.9; 127.0; 121.0	3	68.0; 74.5; 79.0; 87.0	433.1; 79.1; 110.9; 114.8; 128.3	5	880.4
5	12; 12–1; 12–2; 12–3; 12–4	Slovenia; Silva Verbič; Matic Hladnik; Lara Logar; Mark Hafnar	74.5; 77.0; 79.5; 87.5	444.6; 97.7; 105.3; 117.6; 124.0	4	69.0; 76.5; 70.0; 82.5	421.4; 94.6; 108.3; 95.0; 123.5	6	866.0
6	11; 11–1; 11–2; 11–3; 11–4	Germany; Jenny Nowak; Jan Andersen; Michelle Göbel; Luca Geyer	89.0; 89.5; DSQ; 80.0	363.1; 114.6; 132.3; 0.0; 116.2	9	82.0; 85.5; 80.5; 80.0	460.7; 108.6; 128.5; 112.3; 111.3	3	823.8
7	7; 7–1; 7–2; 7–3; 7–4	Norway; Thea Minyan Bjørseth; Johan Fredriksen Orset; Heidi Dyhre Traaserud; Simen Markeng	78.0; 77.0; 67.0; 77.0	403.5; 108.6; 111.4; 84.1; 99.4	7	81.0; 79.5; 68.0; 74.0	417.0; 121.8; 113.8; 79.8; 101.6	8	820.5
8	6; 6–1; 6–2; 6–3; 6–4	Czech Republic; Tereza Koldovská; Jan Šimek; Štěpánka Ptáčková; Jiří Konvalinka	67.0; 80.5; 83.0; 78.0	413.7; 75.4; 117.5; 111.6; 109.2	6	62.5; 80.0; 79.0; 73.0	403.9; 77.8; 116.1; 105.9; 104.1	9	817.6
9	3; 3–1; 3–2; 3–3; 3–4	Italy; Annika Sieff; Stefano Radovan; Jessica Malsiner; Daniel Moroder	74.0; 82.0; 82.0; DSQ	333.5; 106.3; 117.5; 109.7; 0.0	11	72.0; 81.0; 73.5; 78.5	418.3; 104.0; 114.6; 90.9; 108.8	7	751.8
10	2; 2–1; 2–2; 2–3; 2–4	Finland; Annamaija Oinas; Waltteri Karhumaa; Julia Tervahartiala; Tomas Kuisma	62.5; 84.0; 78.5; 64.5	373.1; 71.5; 127.4; 97.2; 77.0	8	60.5; 77.0; 64.5; 69.0	352.6; 62.2; 115.3; 85.8; 89.3	10	725.7
11	4; 4–1; 4–2; 4–3; 4–4	United States; Alexa Brabec; Niklas Malacinski; Paige Jones; Landon Lee	65.5; 79.5; 70.5; 64.5	353.9; 72.0; 126.6; 86.0; 69.3	10	58.5; 78.0; 63.0; 66.0	323.2; 60.5; 110.0; 70.8; 81.9	11	677.1
12	1; 1–1; 1–2; 1–3; 1–4	Switzerland; Emely Torazza; Nico Zarucchi; Rea Kindlimann; Lean Niederberger	DNS; 73.5; 68.0; 79.0	290.7; 0.0; 107.5; 79.2; 104.0	12	DNS; 65.5; 66.5; 81.0	270.4; 0.0; 87.7; 77.2; 105.5	12	561.1
