= Ski jumping at the 2020 Winter Youth Olympics – Girls' individual normal hill =

Girls' individual normal hill at the III Winter Youth Olympic Games
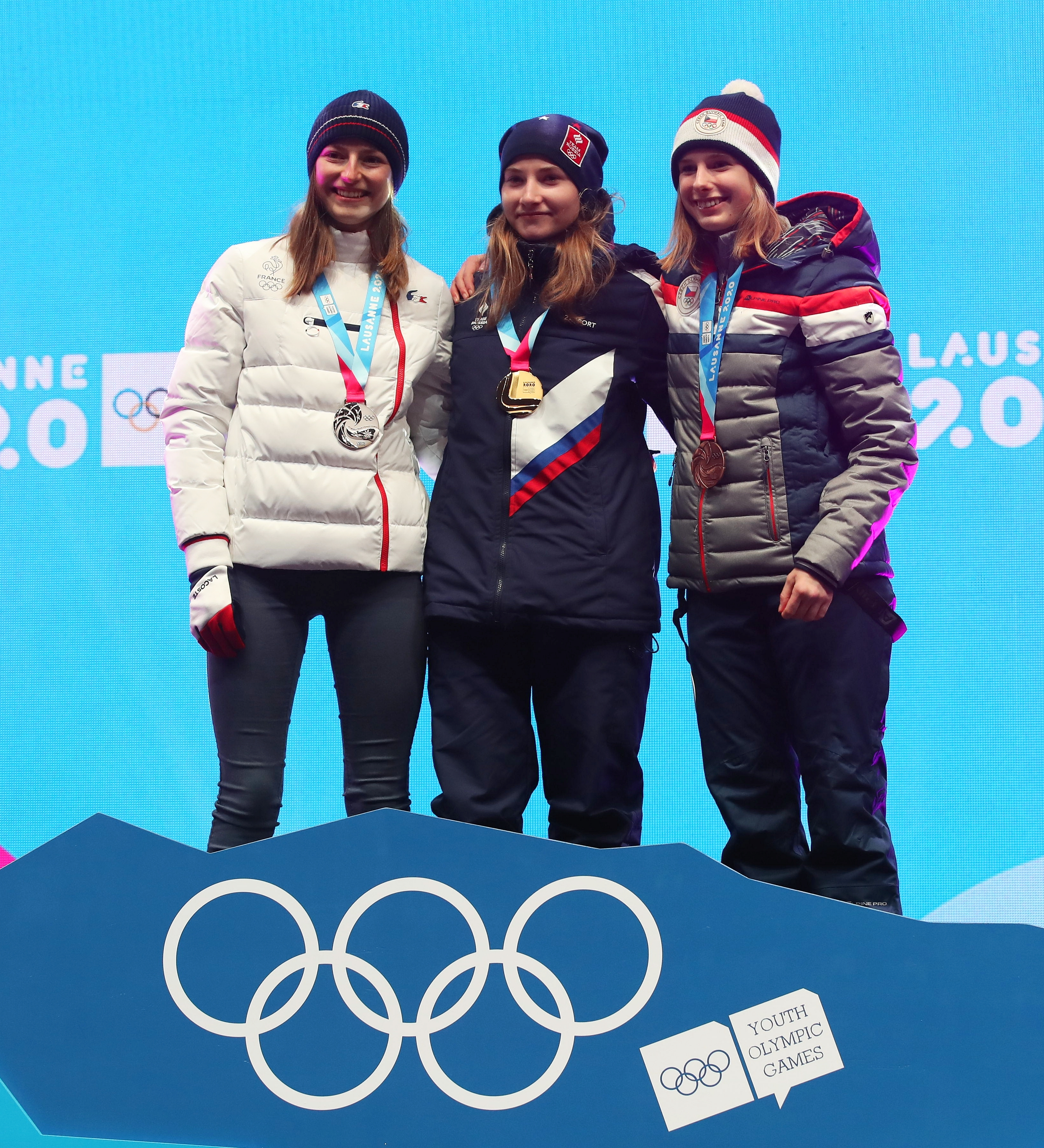
- Venue: Les Tuffes Nordic Centre
- Dates: 19 January
- Competitors: 33 from 18 nations
- Winning points: 229.6

Medalists
| 1st place, gold medalist(s) | | Anna Shpyneva | Russia |
| 2nd place, silver medalist(s) | | Joséphine Pagnier | France |
| 3rd place, bronze medalist(s) | | Štěpánka Ptáčková | Czech Republic |

The girls' ski jumping event at the 2020 Winter Youth Olympics was held on 19 January at the Les Tuffes Nordic Centre.

== Results ==
The first round was started at 10:30 and the final round at 11:45.

| Rank | Bib | Name | Country | Round 1 | | | Final round | | | Total |
| Rank | Bib | Name | Country | Distance (m) | Points | Rank | Distance (m) | Points | Rank | Points |
|---|---|---|---|---|---|---|---|---|---|---|
| 1st place, gold medalist(s) | 19 | Anna Shpyneva | Russia | 85.0 | 119.8 | 2 | 84.0 | 109.8 | 1 | 229.6 |
| 2nd place, silver medalist(s) | 32 | Joséphine Pagnier | France | 82.0 | 124.2 | 1 | 79.5 | 98.6 | 3 | 222.8 |
| 3rd place, bronze medalist(s) | 29 | Štěpánka Ptáčková | Czech Republic | 80.0 | 109.7 | 4 | 83.5 | 104.9 | 2 | 214.6 |
| 4 | 18 | Julia Mühlbacher | Austria | 81.5 | 113.0 | 3 | 74.5 | 92.9 | 5 | 205.9 |
| 5 | 22 | Machiko Kubota | Japan | 82.5 | 107.3 | 6 | 73.0 | 95.2 | 4 | 202.5 |
| 6 | 2 | Yuna Kasai | Japan | 82.5 | 109.3 | 5 | 74.0 | 86.9 | 8 | 196.2 |
| 7 | 27 | Lara Logar | Slovenia | 80.5 | 105.5 | 7 | 74.0 | 86.1 | 9 | 191.6 |
| 8 | 3 | Klára Ulrichová | Czech Republic | 78.0 | 100.3 | 9 | 76.0 | 89.4 | 7 | 189.7 |
| 9 | 17 | Jessica Malsiner | Italy | 74.5 | 96.8 | 12 | 76.0 | 92.8 | 6 | 189.6 |
| 10 | 33 | Zhou Fangyu | China | 77.0 | 102.7 | 8 | 81.0 | 81.1 | 15 | 183.8 |
| 11 | 15 | Giada Tomaselli | Italy | 76.0 | 94.8 | 15 | 78.5 | 85.6 | 10 | 180.4 |
| 12 | 6 | Anna Jäkle | Germany | 74.0 | 95.2 | 14 | 73.5 | 84.5 | 11 | 179.7 |
| 13 | 26 | Michelle Göbel | Germany | 73.5 | 98.1 | 10 | 70.5 | 79.5 | 16 | 177.6 |
| 14 | 8 | Vanessa Moharitsch | Austria | 76.0 | 93.8 | 17 | 73.0 | 83.6 | 12 | 177.4 |
| 15 | 20 | Emely Torazza | Switzerland | 72.0 | 95.9 | 13 | 72.0 | 81.4 | 14 | 177.3 |
| 16 | 10 | Pia Mazi | Slovenia | 74.5 | 93.8 | 17 | 74.0 | 83.0 | 13 | 176.8 |
| 17 | 23 | Veronika Shishkina | Kazakhstan | 72.5 | 97.8 | 11 | 73.0 | 78.0 | 18 | 175.8 |
| 18 | 12 | Alina Borodina | Russia | 75.0 | 94.5 | 16 | 69.0 | 76.9 | 19 | 171.4 |
| 19 | 25 | Nora Midtsundstad | Norway | 70.0 | 89.7 | 21 | 67.0 | 79.3 | 17 | 169.0 |
| 20 | 21 | Julia Tervahartiala | Finland | 69.0 | 92.3 | 19 | 69.0 | 76.2 | 20 | 168.5 |
| 21 | 34 | Annika Belshaw | United States | 68.5 | 90.5 | 20 | 66.0 | 73.4 | 21 | 163.9 |
| 22 | 9 | Heidi Dyhre Traaserud | Norway | 71.5 | 87.2 | 22 | 63.5 | 66.7 | 25 | 153.9 |
| 23 | 13 | Paige Jones | United States | 68.0 | 82.2 | 23 | 70.5 | 70.9 | 22 | 153.1 |
| 24 | 11 | Rea Kindlimann | Switzerland | 69.0 | 76.8 | 24 | 61.5 | 57.9 | 28 | 134.7 |
| 25 | 16 | Delia Folea | Romania | 64.0 | 64.8 | 26 | 63.0 | 68.0 | 23 | 132.8 |
| 26 | 24 | Wiktoria Przybyła | Poland | 63.5 | 63.6 | 27 | 69.0 | 67.5 | 24 | 131.1 |
| 27 | 5 | Vitalina Herasymiuk | Ukraine | 59.0 | 62.6 | 28 | 64.0 | 63.6 | 26 | 126.2 |
| 28 | 30 | Tetiana Pylypchuk | Ukraine | 63.0 | 65.0 | 25 | 63.0 | 55.1 | 29 | 120.1 |
| 29 | 7 | Amina Tukhtayeva | Kazakhstan | 61.0 | 57.5 | 32 | 64.5 | 61.0 | 27 | 118.5 |
| 30 | 4 | Annamaija Oinas | Finland | 59.5 | 61.3 | 30 | 55.0 | 47.2 | 30 | 108.5 |
| 31 | 31 | Esmeralda Gobozova | Georgia | 58.0 | 60.0 | 31 | 53.0 | 38.3 | 31 | 98.3 |
| 32 | 14 | Maria Chindriş | Romania | 56.5 | 61.9 | 29 | 54.5 | 34.2 | 32 | 96.1 |
| 33 | 1 | Wiktoria Polanowska | Poland | 55.5 | 47.4 | 33 | 53.5 | 31.6 | 33 | 79.0 |
| | 28 | Triinu Hausenberg | Estonia | Did not start | | | | | | |

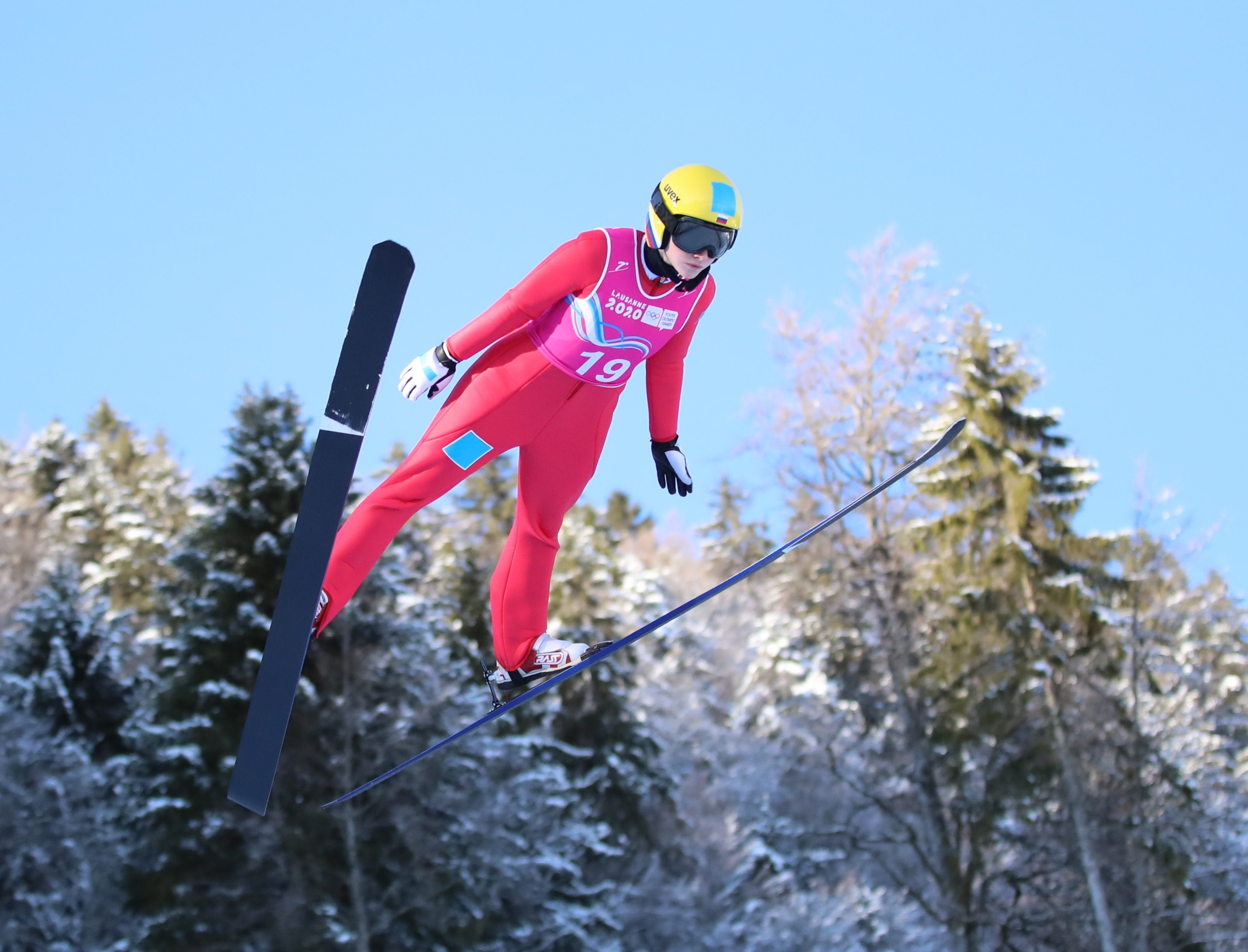
Anna Shpyneva

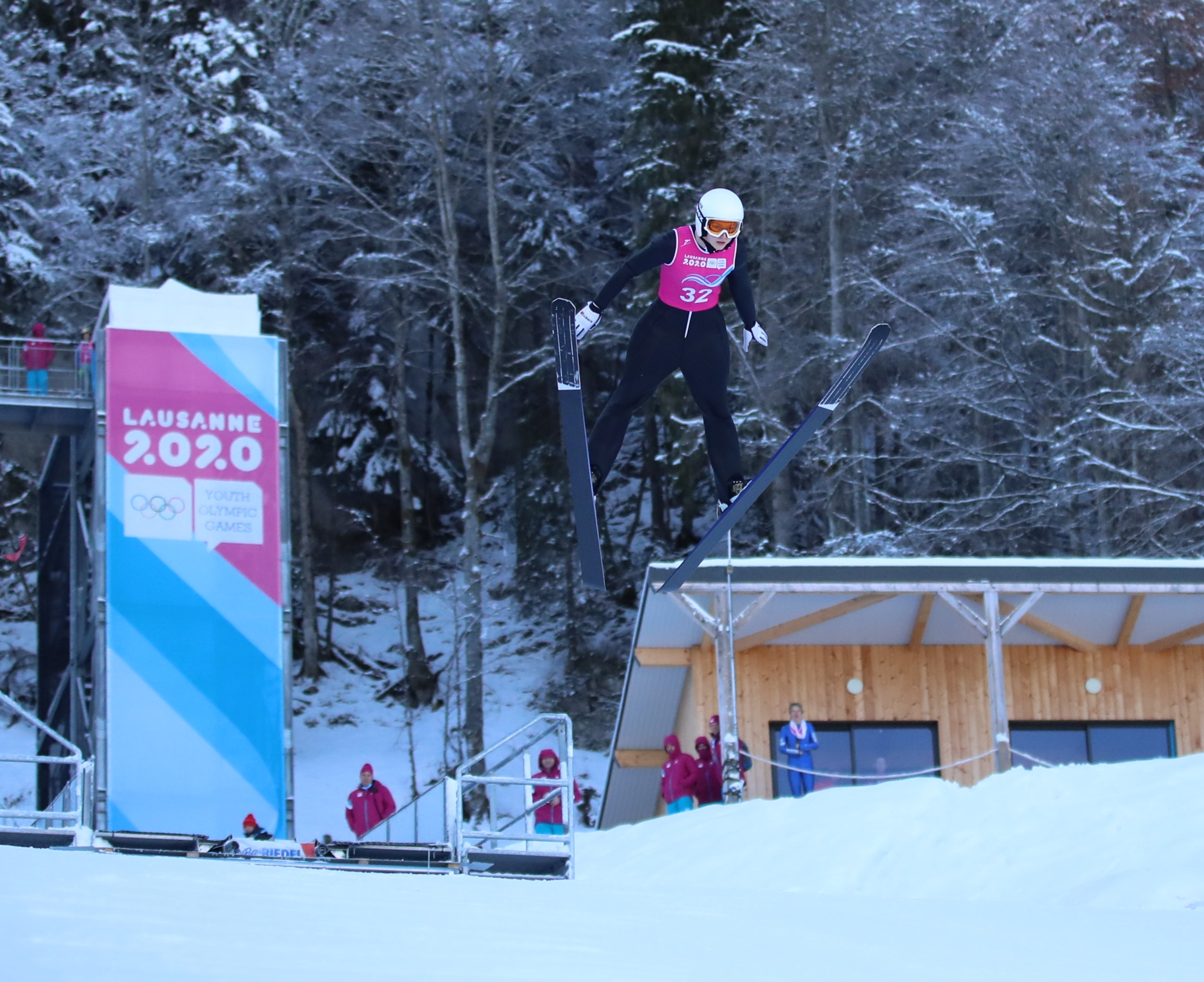
Joséphine Pagnier

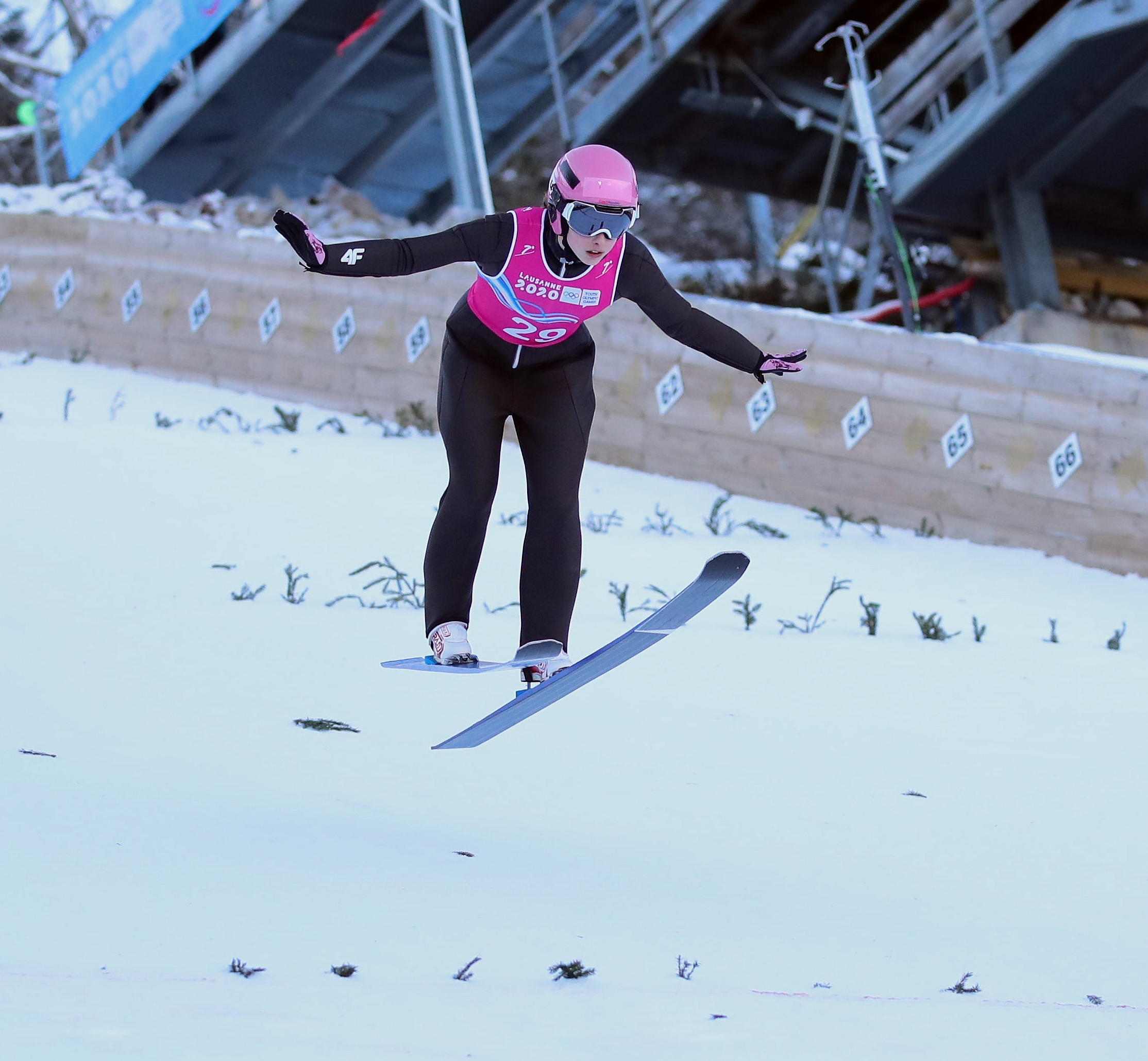
Štěpánka Ptáčková
