= Caitlin McFarlane =

French alpine skier (born 2002)

Caitline McFarlane
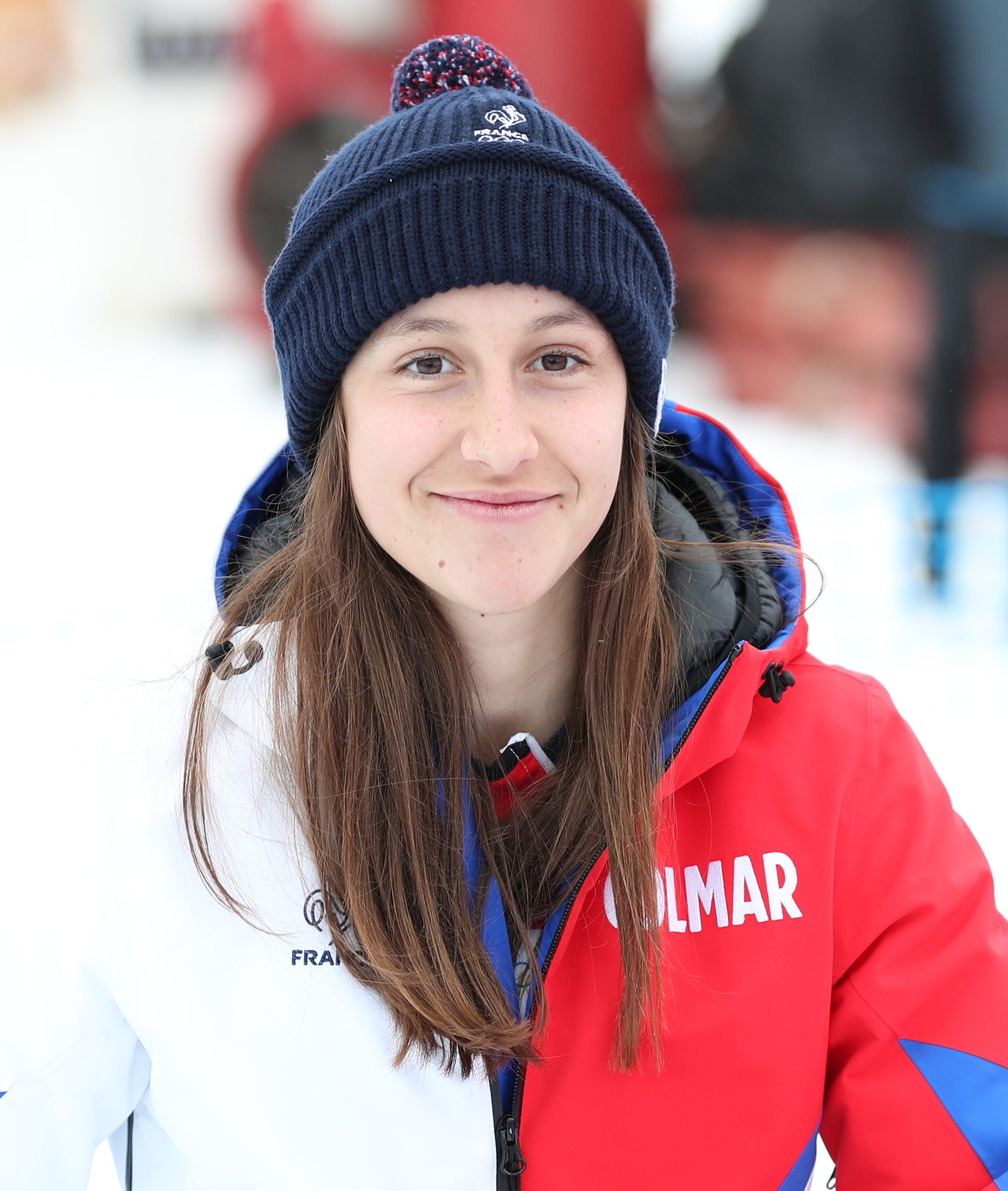
- McFarlane in 2020

Personal information
- Born: 22 March 2002 (age 24) Sydney, Australia
- Home town: Saint-Jean-d'Aulps, Haute-Savoie, France

Skiing career
- Country: France
- Sport: Alpine skiing
- Club: Ski club Saint Jean d'Aulps
- Disciplines: Slalom, giant slalom, super-G
- World Cup debut: 21 December 2023 (age 21)

Olympics
- Teams: 1 – (2026)
- Medals: 0

World Championships
- Teams: 0

World Cup
- Seasons: 3 – (2024–2026)
- Podiums: 0
- Overall titles: 0 – (57th in 2026)
- Discipline titles: 0 – (20th in GS, 2026)
Medal record
Representing France
Youth Olympic Games
Silver medal – second place	2020 Lausanne	Super-G

Caitlin McFarlane (born 22 March 2002 in Sydney, Australia) is an alpine skier who competes for France internationally. She represented France at the 2020 Winter Youth Olympics and the 2026 Winter Olympics, winning a silver medal in the super-G at the former.

McFarlane moved from Australia to Saint-Jean-d'Aulps, Haute-Savoie, in France at age three. She debuted in the FIS Alpine Ski World Cup in 2023.

== World Cup results ==
=== Season standings ===
Season
Season	Age	Overall	Slalom	Giant slalom	Super-G	Downhill
2024	21	109	53	48	—	—
2025	22	107	50	—	—	—
2026	23	57	20	—	—	—

=== Top-ten finishes ===
- 0 podiums; 1 top ten

Season
Season	Date	Location	Discipline	Place
2026	24 March 2026	Hafjell, Norway	Slalom	8th

== Olympics results ==
Year
Year	Age	Slalom	Giant slalom	Super-G	Downhill	Team combined
2026	23	10	—	—	—	12
