= Mia Nuriah Freudweiler =

Pakistani alpine skier

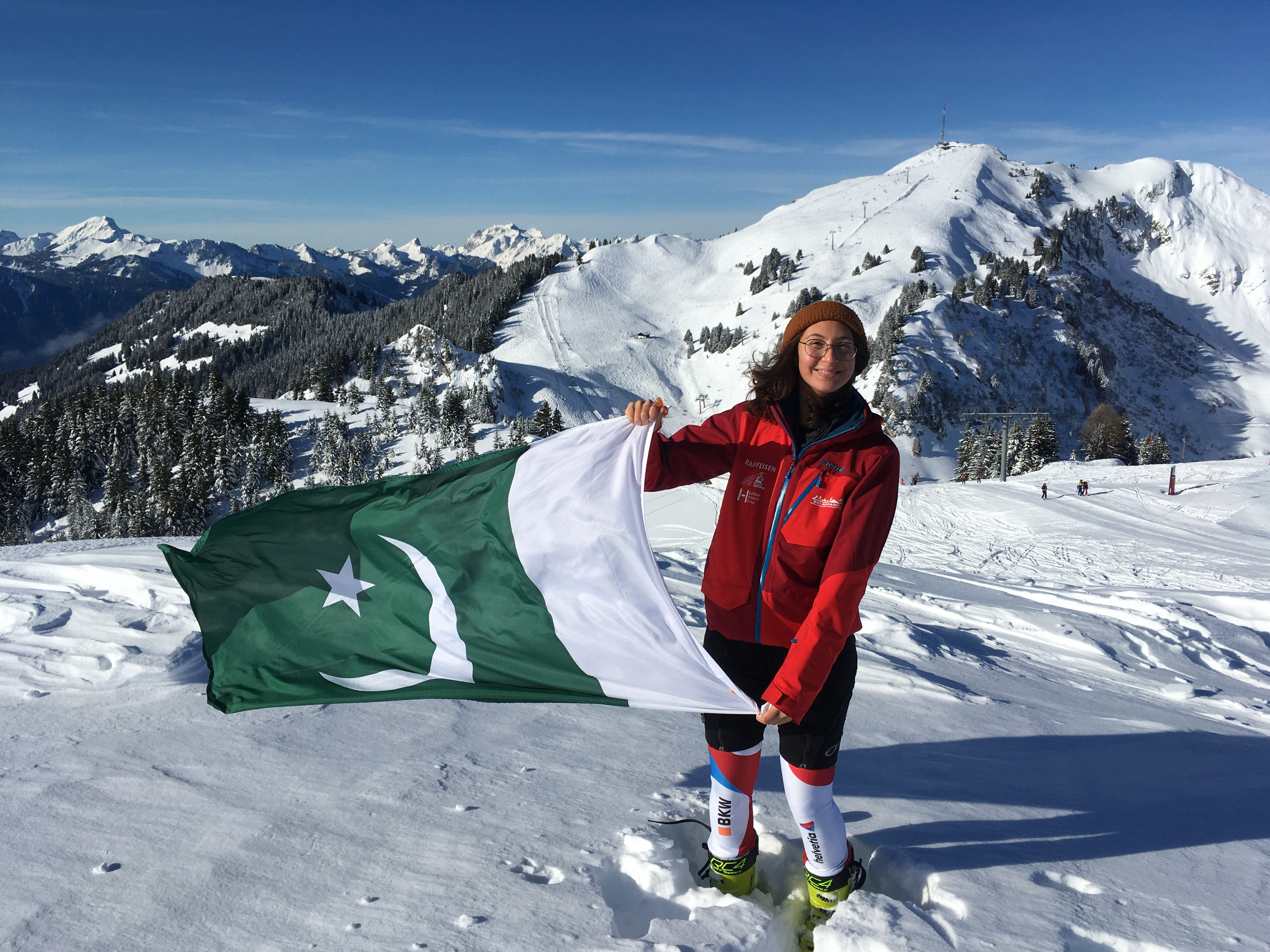
- Mia with Pakistani flag 2019

Personal information
- Born: 15 April 2003 (age 23) Nice, France

Skiing career
- Sport: Alpine skiing
- Club: Ski-Club Villars Villars-sur-Ollon
- Retired: 12 February 2020
- Disciplines: Slalom, combined, giant slalom, super-G

Mia Nuriah Freudweiler (born 15 April 2003) is a Pakistani former alpine skier. She was the first Pakistani to compete in a Winter Youth Olympics after qualifying for the 2020 Winter Youth Olympics in Lausanne.

Freudweiler grew up in Switzerland and lives in Villars-sur-Ollon.

== Skiing career ==
Freudweiler participated in her first FIS race (Entry League FIS) in October 2019, in downhill skiing in Snow Valley in Belgium, where she came in 19th place.

She participated in the 2020 Winter Youth Olympics, the first time Pakistan participated in a Winter Youth Olympics. She finished 46th in the Super-G race, which was won by Amélie Klopfenstein from Switzerland. In the following super combined event she rose to rank 30th. She did not finish the slalom nor the giant slalom.

A ski accident in February 2020 put an end to her ski racing career. She also withdrew from the 2022 Winter Olympics.
