= Julia Mühlbacher =

Austrian ski jumper (born 2004)

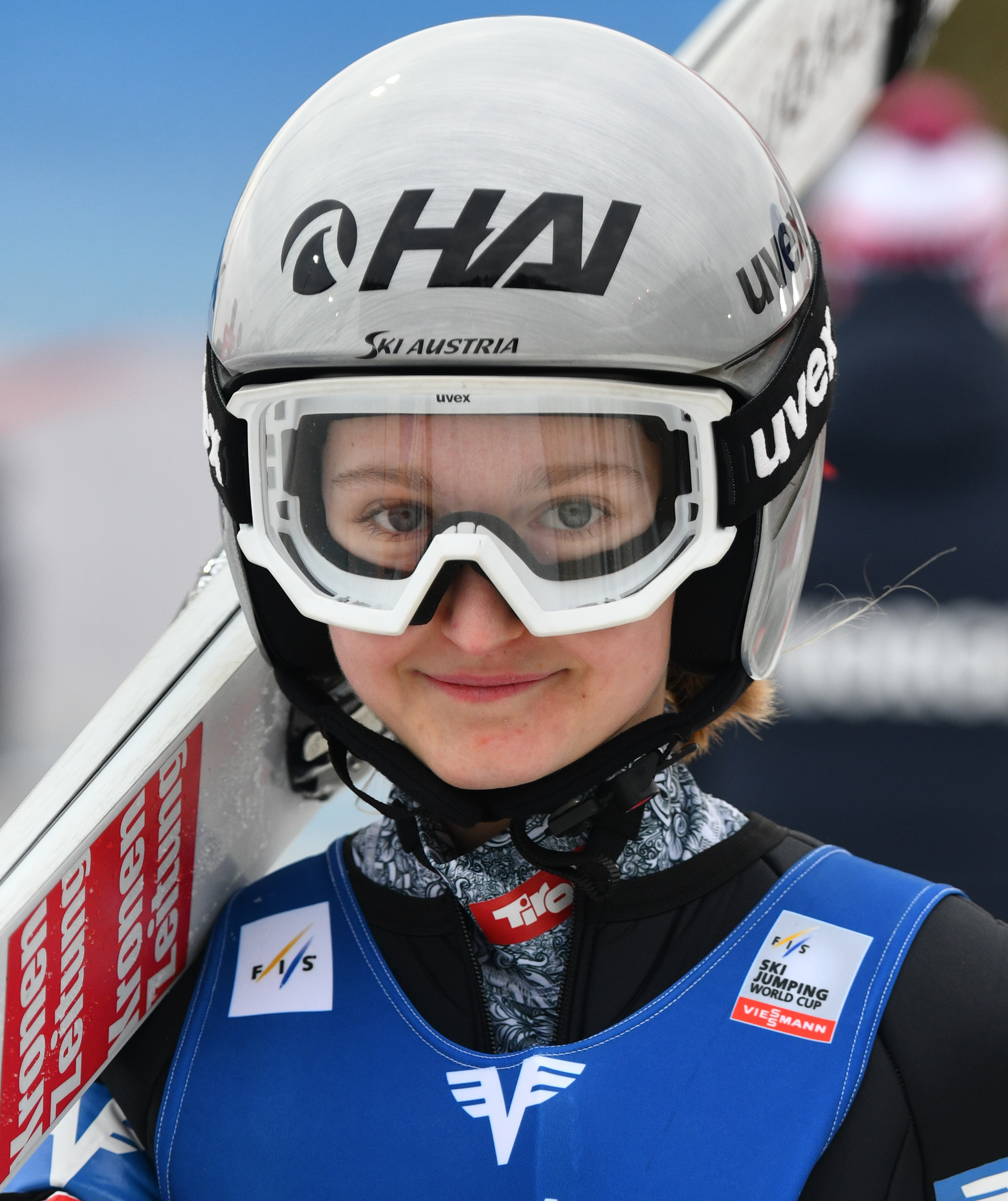
- Mühlbacher in 2023

Personal information
- Born: 2 August 2004 (age 21) Braunau am Inn, Austria
- Height: 158 cm (5 ft 2 in)

Sport
- Sport: Ski jumping
- Club: ASVÖ SC Hoehnhart
Medal record
Women's ski jumping
Representing Austria
World Championships
Silver medal – second place	2025 Trondheim	Team NH
Silver medal – second place	2023 Planica	Team NH
Youth Olympic Games
Gold medal – first place	2020 Lausanne	Mixed team NH

Julia Mühlbacher (born 2 August 2004) is an Austrian ski jumper.

== Career ==
She made her FIS Ski Jumping World Cup debut in December 2020 in Ramsau. As of 2026, she won one individual third place and one third place with the Austrian mixed team.

Competing for Austria at the 2020 Winter Youth Olympics, Mühlbacher earned a gold medal in the mixed team normal hill event and placed 4th in the individual normal hill event.
