= Marco Wörgötter =

Austrian ski jumper (born 2002)

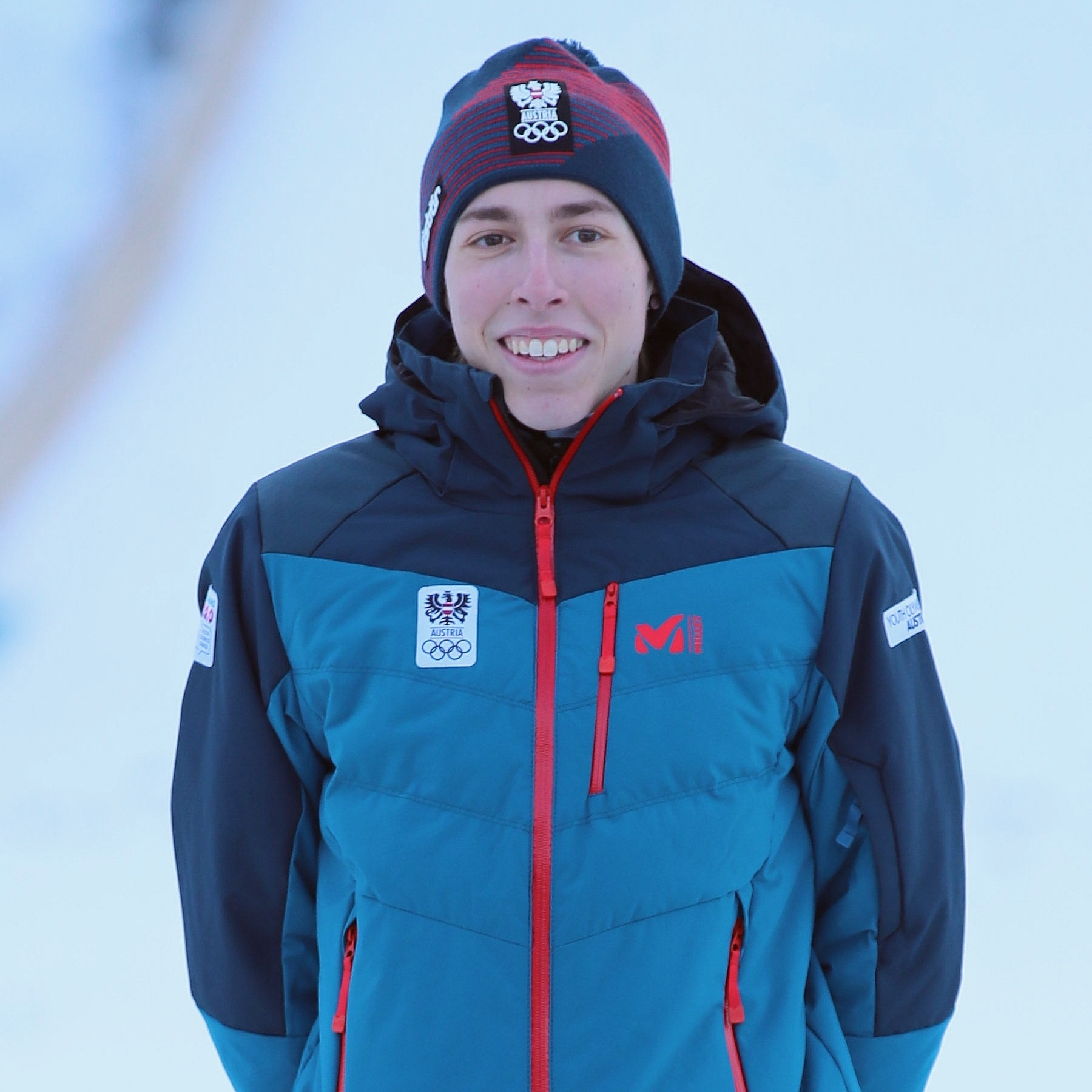
- Wörgötter at the 2020 Winter Youth Olympics

Personal information
- Born: 16 October 2002 (age 23) St. Johann in Tirol, Austria

Sport
- Sport: Ski jumping
Medal record
Men's ski jumping
Representing Austria
Winter Youth Olympics
Gold medal – first place	2020 Lausanne	Individual NH
Gold medal – first place	2020 Lausanne	Mixed team NH
Junior World Championships
Gold medal – first place	2020 Oberwiesenthal	Mixed team NH
Silver medal – second place	2020 Oberwiesenthal	Team NH

Marco Wörgötter (born 16 October 2002) is an Austrian ski jumper.

== Career ==
In January 2020, Wörgötter represented Austria at the 2020 Winter Youth Olympics and won a gold medal in the individual normal hill with a score of 257.7. He also won a gold medal in the mixed team normal hill event. In March 2020, he competed at the 2020 Nordic Junior World Ski Championships and won a gold medal in the mixed team normal hill and a silver medal in the team normal hill events.
