= Daniel Moroder =

Italian ski jumper (born 2002)

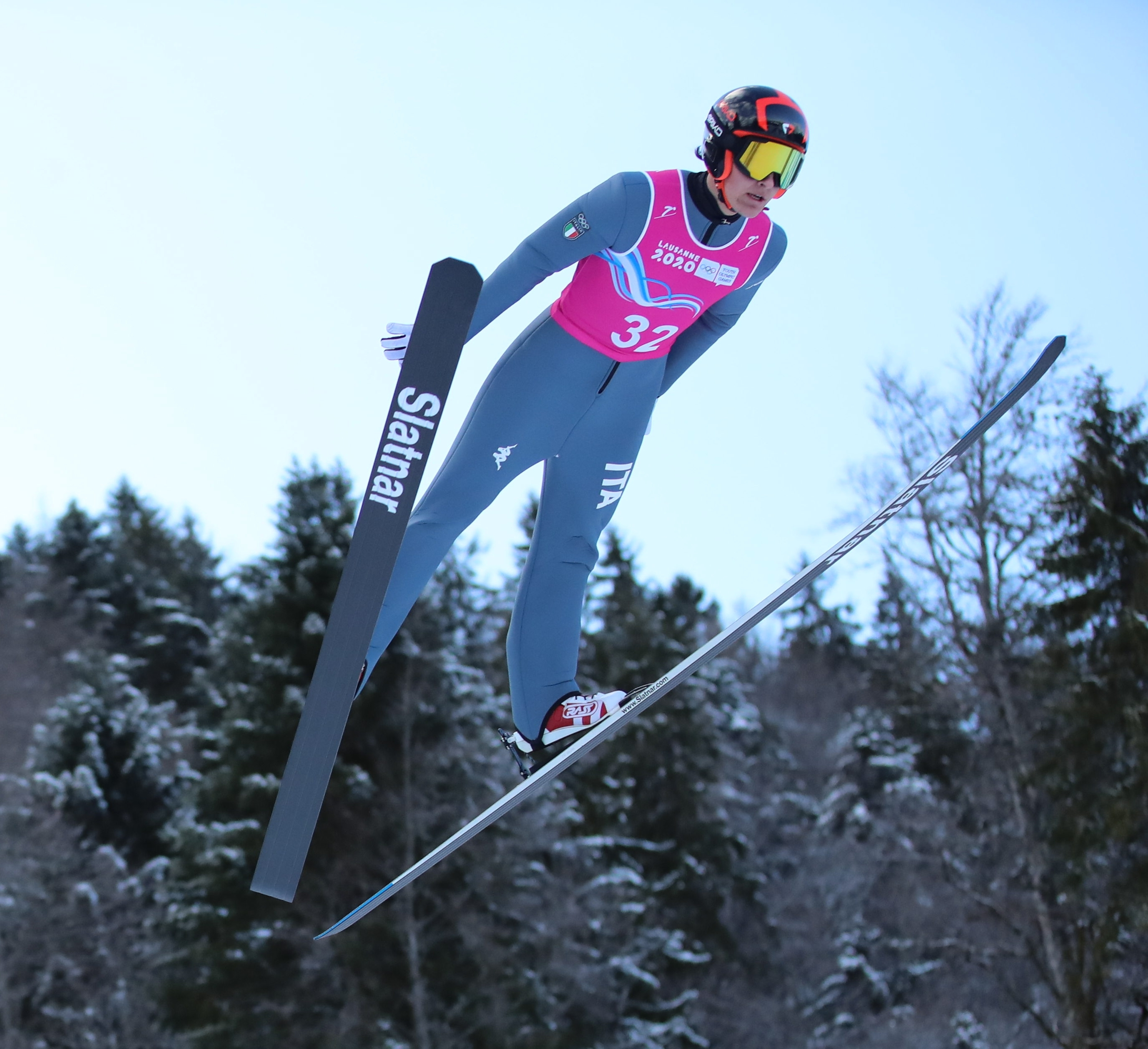
- Daniel Moroder 2020

Personal information
- Full name: Daniel Moroder
- Nationality: German
- Born: 22 January 2002 (age 24) Sterzing, Italy

Sport
- Sport: Skiing
- Club: SC Gardena Raiffeisen Gherdëina

Achievements and titles
- Personal best: 158th

Daniel Moroder (born 22 January 2002 in Sterzing) is an Italian ski jumper.

== Career ==
Moroder made his debut on 13 January 2017 in Schonach, during an individual competition on the normal hill, achieving 73rd place in the Alpine Ski Jumping Cup, in which he also competed in 2021. Two years later he took part in the 2019 Nordic Junior World Ski Championships in Lahti, Finland. In the individual competition on the normal hill, Moroder placed 51st and was eliminated in the first round. Together with Francesco Cecon, Mattia Galiani and Giovanni Bresadola, he also competed in the team competition. The team reached the twelfth position out of 14 teams. At the 2020 Winter Youth Olympic Games in Lausanne, Moroder finished 15th in the individual on the normal hill.

On 8 February 2020 Moroder made his debut in the Ski Jumping Continental Cup in Brotterode, finishing in 49th place. On 23 February in Val di Fiemme he scored his first two points in this competition series, the season of which he placed 106th with these two points 3rd place in the Winter Continental Cup ranking and 158th place in the combined ranking of summer and winter. At the Nordic Junior World Ski Championships 2020 in Oberwiesenthal, Moroder placed 34th in the individual. In the men's team competition he finished eleventh together with Mattia Galiani, Domenico Mariotti and Francesco Cecon and reached the mixed team competition together with Jessica Malsiner, Mattia Galiani and Lara Malsiner achieved the eighth position.

In the 2020/21 season, Moroder took part in a qualifying event for the ski jumping World Cup competition in Zakopane on 15 January 2021, but only placed 53rd. Moroder competed in the team competition on the following day alongside Francesco Cecon, Giovanni Bresadola and Alex Insam, in which they were eliminated in the first round. In the Junior World Ski Championships 2021 in Lahti, he was 23 in singles. In the team with Mattia Galiani, Francesco Cecon and Giovanni Bresadola, he finished seventh.

At the Nordic World Ski Championships in Oberstdorf in 2021, Moroder was able to qualify for the individual jumping on the normal hill, in which he was eliminated in the first round placing 51st. After the first week of competition, the Italian ski jumpers had to leave Oberstdorf by order of their ski association after several members of the team had become infected with SARS-CoV-2.

== Personal life ==
Daniel Moroder comes from Val Gardena. He is in a relationship with the Italian ski jumper Lara Malsiner.

== Statistics ==
=== Continental Cup standings ===
Saison	Sommer		Winter		Gesamt	
Saison	Place	Points	Place	Points	Place	Points
2019/20	—	—	106.	2	158.	2
