= Marco Heinis =

French Nordic combined skier (born 2003)

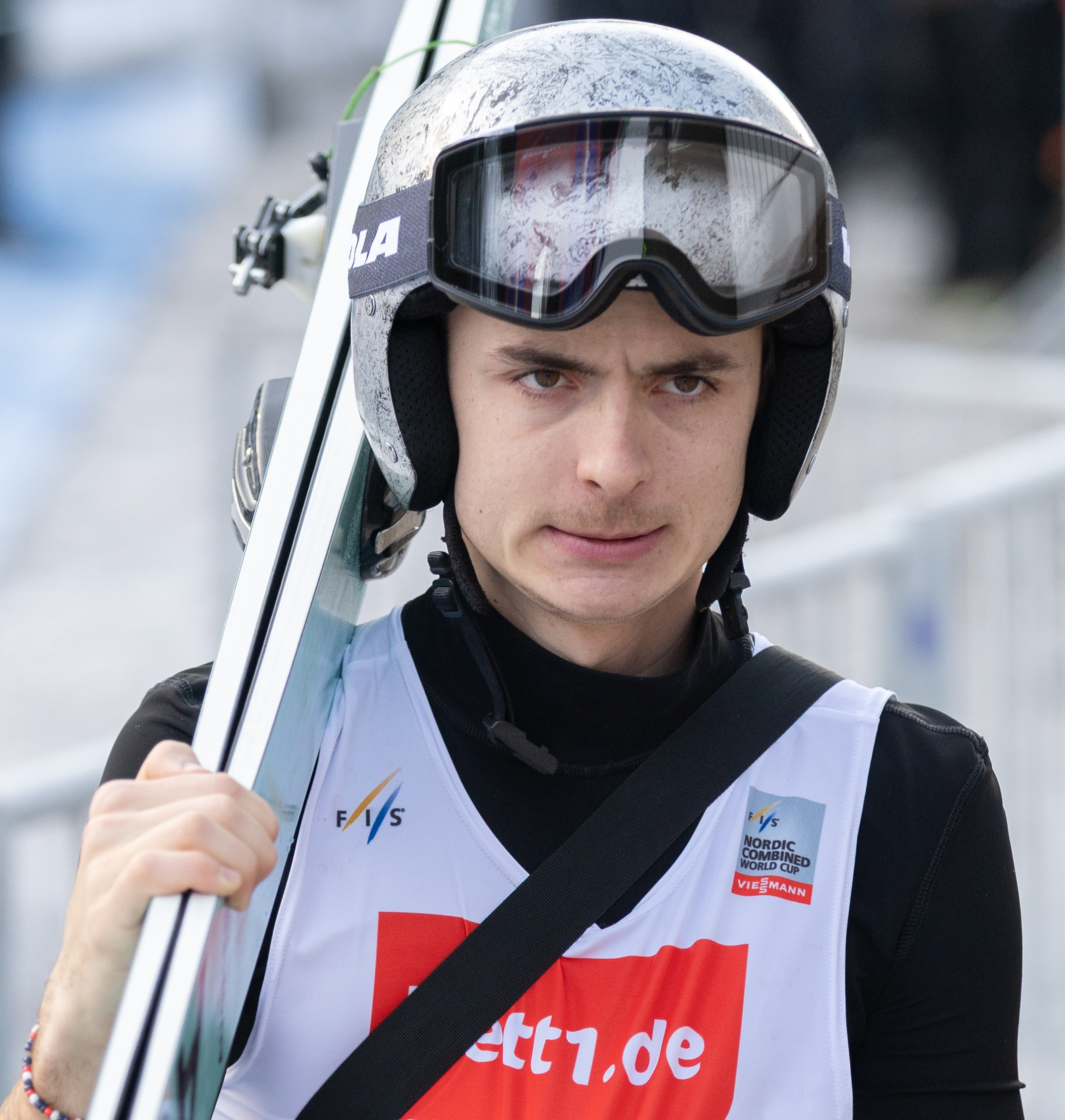
- Heinis in 2026

Personal information
- Nationality: France
- Born: 14 April 2003 (age 23) Pontarlier, France

Sport
- Sport: Skiing

World Cup career
- Seasons: 6 – (2021–present)
Medal record
Men's ski jumping
Representing France
Youth Olympic Games
| Bronze medal – third place | 2020 Lausanne | Mixed team NH |

Marco Heinis (born 14 April 2003) is a French Nordic combined skier. He represented France at the 2026 Winter Olympics.

== Career ==
Heinis represented France at the 2020 Winter Youth Olympics and won a bronze medal in the mixed team event.

During the opening weekend of 2024–25 FIS Cross-Country World Cup, he earned his first career top-ten finish on 29 November 2025, finishing in ninth place.

In January 2026, Heinis was selected to represent France at the 2026 Winter Olympics. On 11 February 2026, he competed in the individual normal hill and finished in 22nd place.
