= Valentin Foubert =

French ski jumper (born 2002)

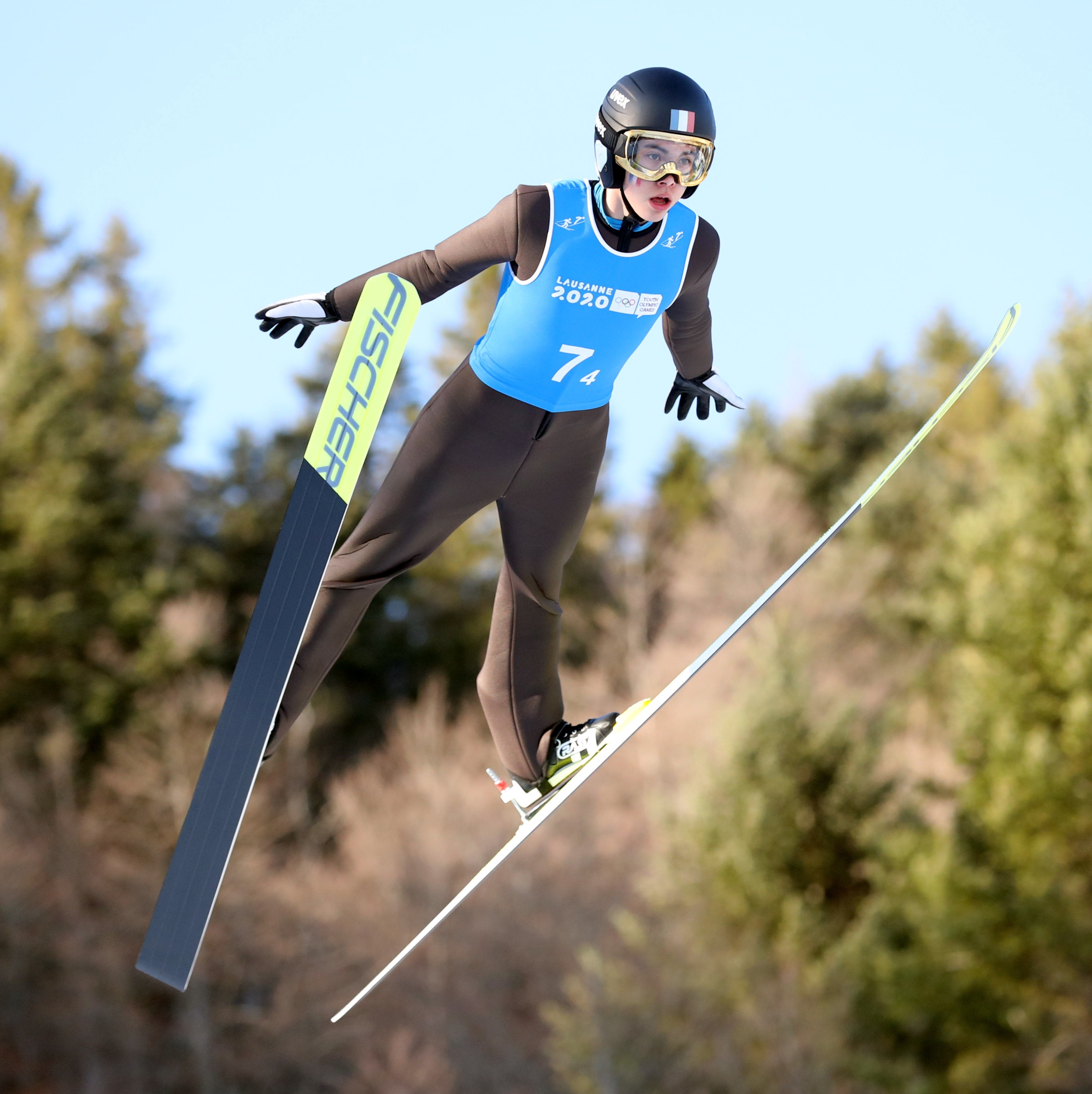
- Foubert at the 2020 Winter Youth Olympics

Personal information
- Born: 17 August 2002 (age 24) Fontainebleau, France

Sport
- Sport: Ski jumping

World Cup career
- Indiv. starts: 79
- Team starts: 12

Achievements and titles
- Personal bests: 239 m (784 ft); Planica, 29 March 2026
Medal record
Men's ski jumping
Representing France
Winter Youth Olympics
Bronze medal – third place	2020 Lausanne	Mixed team NH
- Updated on 21 November 2026

Valentin Foubert (French pronunciation: [valɑ̃tɛ̃ fubɛʁ]; born 17 August 2002) is a French ski jumper. Placing fifth on the normal hill individual event in Milano Cortina at the 2026 Winter Olympics, he set the best ever French men's ski jumping individual result in Winter Olympics history.

He is the current French national record holder with 239 m (784 ft), set in Planica 2026.

== Career ==
Foubert represented France at the 2020 Winter Youth Olympics and won a bronze medal in the mixed team normal hill. He also finished in fourth place in the Nordic mixed team normal hill.

On 29 December 2020, he made a World Cup debut at the 4H Tournament in Oberstdorf where he took 55th place. During the opening event of the 2024 FIS Ski Jumping Grand Prix on 13 August 2024, he earned his first career FIS Ski Jumping Grand Prix podium, finishing in second place. The next day he again finished in second place.

During the 2025/26 World Cup season he earned four top-10 finishes in the World Cup, including fifth place on 29 November 2025, and his best finish, fourth place on 14 December 2025. He was subsequently selected to represent France at the 2026 Winter Olympics.

== Major tournament results ==
=== Winter Olympics ===
Year	Year	Individual		Team	
Year	Year	Normal	Large	Super	Mixed
2026	(Italy) Milano Cortina	5	17	12	9

=== FIS Nordic World Ski Championships ===
Year	Year	Individual		Team	
Year	Year	Normal	Large	Men	Mixed
2025	(Norway) Trondheim	27	36	—	9

=== FIS Ski Flying World Championships ===
Year	Place	Individual	Team
2026	(Germany) Oberstdorf	21	—

== World Cup results ==
=== Standings ===
Season	Overall	4H	SF	RA
2020–21	—	65	—	N/A
2021–22	—	—	—	—
2023–24	61	53	—	48
2024–25	27	29	37	25
2025–26	16	22	11	N/A
2026–27	12			N/A

=== Individual starts ===
winner (1); second (2); third (3); did not compete (–); failed to qualify (q); disqualified (DQ)
Season	1	2	3	4	5	6	7	8	9	10	11	12	13	14	15	16	17	18	19	20	21	22	23	24	25	26	27	28	29	30	31	32	Points
2020–21	Wisła	Ruka	Ruka	Nizhny Tagil	Nizhny Tagil	Engelberg	Engelberg	Oberstdorf	Garmisch-Partenkirchen	Innsbruck	Bischofshofen	Titisee-Neustadt	Titisee-Neustadt	Zakopane	Lahti	Willingen	Willingen	Klingenthal	Klingenthal	Szczyrk	Szczyrk	Râșnov	Planica	Planica	Planica								0
2020–21	–	–	–	–	–	–	–	55	q	q	–	42	44	–	–	–	–	–	–	–	–	DQ	q	63	–								0
2021–22	Nizhny Tagil	Nizhny Tagil	Ruka	Ruka	Wisła	Klingenthal	Klingenthal	Engelberg	Engelberg	Oberstdorf	Garmisch-Partenkirchen	Bischofshofen	Bischofshofen	Bischofshofen	Zakopane	Titisee-Neustadt	Titisee-Neustadt	Willingen	Willingen	Lahti	Lahti	Lillehammer	Oslo	Oslo	Oberstdorf	Oberstdorf	Planica	Planica					0
2021–22	–	–	42	48	–	–	–	–	–	q	q	q	q	q	–	–	–	44	45	–	–	–	–	–	q	q	q	–					0
2023–24	Ruka	Ruka	Lillehammer	Lillehammer	Klingenthal	Klingenthal	Engelberg	Engelberg	Oberstdorf	Garmisch-Partenkirchen	Innsbruck	Bischofshofen	Wisła	Zakopane	Willingen	Willingen	Lake Placid, New York	Lake Placid, New York	Sapporo	Sapporo	Oberstdorf	Oberstdorf	Lahti	Lahti	Oslo	Oslo	Trondheim	Trondheim	Vikersund	Vikersund	Planica	Planica	8
2023–24	–	–	47	42	–	–	42	46	–	32	43	–	–	–	44	23	–	–	–	–	q	36	–	–	49	49	47	36	q	–	36	–	8
2024–25	Lillehammer	Lillehammer	Ruka	Ruka	Wisła	Wisła	Titisee-Neustadt	Titisee-Neustadt	Engelberg	Engelberg	Oberstdorf	Garmisch-Partenkirchen	Innsbruck	Bischofshofen	Zakopane	Oberstdorf	Oberstdorf	Willingen	Willingen	Lake Placid	Lake Placid	Sapporo	Sapporo	Oslo	Vikersund	Vikersund	Lahti	Planica	Planica				173
2024–25	q	21	20	23	24	31	46	23	16	20	28	21	39	34	12	27	35	39	34	23	q	13	20	18	23	42	44	36	27				173
2025–26	Lillehammer	Lillehammer	Falun	Falun	Ruka	Wisła	Wisła	Klingenthal	Klingenthal	Engelberg	Engelberg	Oberstdorf	Garmisch-Partenkirchen	Innsbruck	Bischofshofen	Zakopane	Sapporo	Sapporo	Willingen	Willingen	Bad Mitterndorf	Bad Mitterndorf	Lahti	Lahti	Oslo	Oslo	Vikersund	Planica	Planica				443
2025–26	25	16	q	19	5	10	10	12	4	12	44	30	27	27	21	12	26	41	35	16	14	7	8	45	35	DQ	30	10	5				443
2026–27	Lillehammer	Lillehammer	Ruka	Ruka	Wisła	Wisła	Titisee-Neustadt	Titisee-Neustadt	Engelberg	Engelberg	Oberstdorf	Garmisch-Partenkirchen	Innsbruck	Bischofshofen	Zakopane	Sapporo	Sapporo	Willingen	Willingen	Lake Placid	Lahti	Vikersund	Vikersund	Oslo	Oslo	Planica	Planica						22
2026–27	12																																22
